= 2025 England wheelchair rugby league tour of Australia =

Wheelchair rugby league tour

2025 England wheelchair rugby league tour
- Date: 19 October 2025 – 2 November 2025
- Coach(es): Tom Coyd
- Tour captain(s): Lewis King
- Top point scorer(s): Nathan Collins (26)
- Top try scorer(s): Rob Hawkins (5)
Summary
P	W	D	L
Total
4	4	0	0
Test match
2	2	0	0
Opponent
P	W	D	L
New South Wales
1	1	0	0
Queensland
1	1	0	0
Australia
2	2	0	0

Tour chronology
- Previous tour: 2019
- Next tour: –

The 2025 England wheelchair rugby league tour of Australia was a wheelchair rugby league tour of Australia by the England national wheelchair rugby league team. The tour was announced in December 2024 by the International Rugby League, and saw four matches played including a two-game wheelchair rugby league Ashes series contested by the two nations.

England are the defending champions after winning the inaugural Wheelchair Ashes 2–0 in 2019, in addition to beating the North Queensland, Queensland, and New South Wales representative teams, going the whole tour undefeated.

The NRL used the two tests to start and end a four-day festival of wheelchair rugby league which as well as the test matches included the inaugural NRL Wheelchair Championship.

The Ashes were won by England who repeated their feat of 2019, by winning both games against Australia as well as defeating New South Wales and Queensland.

== Background ==
=== England squad selection process ===
==== Wheelchair festival and intra-squad tri-series ====
In April 2025, the RFL hosted a wheelchair rugby league festival in Nottingham to scout potential new players for the tour. The following month, 24 players made up of invitees from the festival and England regulars contested an intra-squad tri-series tournament in York.

Team 1

- Martin Lane (Sheffield Eagles)
- Wayne Boardman (Halifax Panthers)
- Chris Haynes (Sheffield Eagles)
- Seb Bechara (Catalans Dragons)
- Tristan Norfolk (Hull FC)
- Nathaniel Wright (Halifax Panthers)
- Stephen Reilly (Sheffield Eagles)
- Josh Butler (Leeds Rhinos)
  - Coach – Greg Brown (Sheffield Eagles)
  - Assistant Coach – Tom Halliwell (Leeds Rhinos) (Note: Tom Halliwell, a regular member of the England squad, was injured for the tri-series tournament)

Team 2

- Joe Wink-Simmonds (Sheffield Eagles)
- Joe Coyd (London Roosters)
- Mason Billington (London Roosters)
- Jason Owen (London Roosters)
- Josh Edwards (Hull FC)
- Luis Domingos (Castleford Tigers)
- Jack Brown (Halifax Panthers)
- Finlay O’Neill (Halifax Panthers)
  - Coach – Mike Swainger (Hull FC)
  - Assistant Coach – John McMullen (RFL)

Team 3

- Thomas Oates (Batley Bulldogs)
- Ewan Clibbens (Leeds Rhinos)
- Lewis King (London Roosters)
- Jordan Holt (Halifax Panthers)
- Jack Neatis (Wigan Warriors)
- Rob Hawkins (Halifax Panthers)
- Nathan Collins (Leeds Rhinos)
- Nathan Holmes (Halifax Panthers)
  - Coach – Ian Stapleton (Warrington Wolves)
  - Assistant Coach – Michael Collins (Leeds Rhinos)

==== National Performance Squad selection and Future of England game ====
Following the tri-series tournament, a national performance squad and a "Future of England" squad were selected for training camps on 28 June at St George's Park and on 15 June at the University of York Sport's Centre respectively.

National Performance Squad:

- Seb Bechara (Catalans Dragons)
- Jack Brown (Halifax Panthers)
- Josh Butler (Leeds Rhinos)
- Nathan Collins (Leeds Rhinos)
- Joe Coyd (London Roosters)
- Tom Halliwell (Leeds Rhinos)
- Rob Hawkins (Halifax Panthers)
- Lewis King (London Roosters)

Future of England Squad:

Team 1

- Mason Billington (London Roosters)
- Wayne Boardman (Halifax Panthers)
- Ewan Clibbens (Leeds Rhinos)
- Chris Haynes (Sheffield Eagles)
- Jordan Holt (Halifax Panthers)
- Tristan Norfolk (Hull FC)
- Stephen Reilly (Sheffield Eagles)
- Nathaniel Wright (Halifax Panthers)

Team 2

- Luis Domingos (Castleford Tigers)
- Josh Edwards (Hull FC)
- Nathan Holmes (Halifax Panthers)
- Martin Lane (Halifax Panthers)
- Tom Oates (Batley Bulldogs)
- Finlay O’Neill (Halifax Panthers)
- Jason Owen (London Roosters)
- Joe Wink-Simmonds (Sheffield Eagles)

The Future of England camp involved an intra-squad friendly and saw Billington, Boardman, Domingos, Edwards, Haynes, Holmes, Norfolk, O'Neill, and Owen were advanced to the national performance squad for a second training session and a behind closed doors trial in York on 13 July.

The touring squad was announced on 7 August and will have a final training session on 31 August.

=== Australia coaching changes ===
Ahead of the tour, Queensland head coach Cameron Sullivan joined Brett Clark's coaching staff as an assistant coach.

== Squads ==
=== England ===
The England squad for the tour was announced on 7 August. Captaincy was announced on 31 August. Squad numbers were confirmed on 19 October, the day the squad flew to Australia.

No.	Player	Club
1	Nathan Collins	Leeds Rhinos
2	Mason Billington	London Roosters
3	Joe Coyd	London Roosters
4	Lewis King (C)	London Roosters
5	Rob Hawkins	Halifax Panthers
6	Wayne Boardman	Halifax Panthers
7	Luis Domingos	Castleford Tigers
8	Jack Brown (VC)	Halifax Panthers
9	Seb Bechara	Catalans Dragons
10	Finlay O’Neill	Halifax Panthers

=== Australia ===
The Australia squad was named on 17 September. Daniel Anstey is the only player who was not in the Australian squad at the 2021 Wheelchair Rugby League World Cup.

Player	Club	State
Bayley McKenna	Brothers Townsville	Queensland
Zac Schumacher	Brothers Townsville	Queensland
Diab Karim	Parramatta Eels	New South Wales
Peter Arbuckle	Gold Coast Titans	Queensland
Daniel Anstey	Gold Coast Titans	Queensland
Cory Cannane	St George Illawarra Dragons	New South Wales
Adam Tannock	Townsville Marlins	Queensland
Brad Grove	Parramatta Eels	New South Wales
Reserves
Dylan Gawthorne	South East Queensland Stingrays	Queensland
Liam Luff	Parramatta Eels	New South Wales

== Fixtures ==
Fixtures for the tour were confirmed on 18 May 2025.

England began their tour with a dominant win over New South Wales, before a tightly contested match against Queensland three days later.

In the first of the Ashes tests, England opened strongly scoring 16 points in the first eight minutes. Australia quickly got back into the game bringing the score to 28 points to 26 in favour of the hosts with a quarter of the match to go. The final 23 minutes however saw five unanswered tries from England resulting in a convincing win for the tourists.

In the second and final test, Australia saw a controlling first half performance, scoring inside two minutes. An initial England response of two tries was silenced by a further four from Australia with England only managing one more in the half. Australia led 30 point to 18 at half time. However, unlike the first test, Australia were unable to carry their momentum. England scored five tries in 25 minutes of the second half with Australian managing just the two to bring the scores level. A final try from England with two minutes to go won the game and the Ashes for the tourists.

24 October 2025
19:00 AEDT (UTC+11:00)

New South Wales	10–86	England
Tries: Cannane, Engles; Goals: Karim (1/2)	1st: 10–34; 2nd: 0–52; Report	Tries: Brown (3), King, Boardman, Domingos, Collins, Hawkins (5), Bechara (2), Coyd; Goals: Boardman (5/6), Collins (8/9)

Whitlam Centre, Sydney
Referee: Steve Hewson (Australia)

Team details
New South Wales		Position	England
Name	Number	Position	Number	Name
Cory Cannane	1	Starter	1	Mason Billington
Liam Luff	2	Starter	2	Jack Brown
Brad Grove (c)	3	Starter	3	Wayne Boardman
Diab Karim	4	Starter	4	Lewis King (c)
Toby Popple	5	Starter	5	Luis Domingos
Richard Engles	6	Interchange	6	Finlay O’Neill
Joey Abboud	7	Interchange	7	Joe Coyd
Brad Burns	8	Interchange	8	Nathan Collins
Stephan Rochecouste	9	Interchange	9	Seb Bechara
Chris O'Brien	10	Interchange	10	Rob Hawkins
Neil Stanley		Coach		Tom Coyd

27 October 2025
12:00 AEST (UTC+10:00)

Queensland	60–72	England
Tries: Arbuckle, Anstey (2), Schumaker (5), Tannock (2); Goals: Kruger (1/1), McKenna (9/9)	1st: 24–42; 2nd: 36–30; Report	Tries: Collins (2), Hawkins, Coyd (3), King, Billington (2), Domingos (2), Bechara, O'Neill; Goals: Collins (7/8), Hawkins (1/1), Coyd (1/2), Boardman (1/1), O'Neill (0/1)

Caloundra Sports Centre, Sunshine Coast
Player of the Match: Nathan Collins

Team details
Queensland		Position	England
Name	Number	Position	Number	Name
Pete Arbuckle	1	Starter	1	Nathan Collins
Dan Anstey	2	Starter	2	Rob Hawkins
Jack Kruger	3	Starter	3	Joe Coyd
Dylan Gawthorne	4	Starter	4	Lewis King
Brett Bazley	5	Starter	5	Mason Billington
Bayley McKenna	6	Interchange	6	Wayne Boardman
Zac Schumacher	7	Interchange	7	Luis Domingos
Adam Tannock	8	Interchange	8	Jack Brown
John Clarke	9	Interchange	9	Seb Bechara
		Interchange	10	Finley O'Neill
Jeff Wright		Coach		Tom Coyd

30 October 2025
15:00 AEST (UTC+10:00)

Australia	28–56	England
Tries: Schumacher (2), Anstey (2), Cannane; Goals: Schumacher (4/5)	1st: 12–22; 2nd: 16–34; Report	Tries: Collins (2), Coyd, Hawkins (3), King, Billington, O'Neill, Bechara; Goals: Collins (4/7), Hawkins (4/4)

Gold Coast Sports and Leisure Centre, Gold Coast
Referees: Rebecca Whiteley (England), Steve Hewson (Australia)

Team details
Australia		Position	England
Name	Number	Position	Number	Name
Dan Anstey	1	Starter	1	Nathan Collins
Cory Cannane	2	Starter	2	Rob Hawkins
Zac Schumacher	3	Starter	3	Joe Coyd
Adam Tannock	4	Starter	4	Lewis King
Diab Karim	5	Starter	5	Mason Billington
Peter Arbuckle	6	Interchange	6	Jack Brown
Brad Grove	7	Interchange	7	Seb Bechara
Dylan Gawthorne	8	Interchange	8	Finley O'Neill
Brett Clark		Coach		Tom Coyd

2 November 2025
15:00 AEST (UTC+10:00)

Australia	42–48	England
Tries: McKenna (2), Schumacher, Karim, Anstey (2), Tannock; Goals: McKenna (7/7)	1st: 30–18; 2nd: 12–30; Report	Tries: Hawkins (2), King (3), O'Neill, Brown (2); Goals: Collins (5/5), Hawkins (1/4)

Gold Coast Sports and Leisure Centre, Gold Coast
Referees: Rebecca Whiteley (England), Anthony Bishop (Australia)

Team details
Australia		Position	England
Name	Number	Position	Number	Name
Bayley McKenna	1	Starter	1	Nathan Collins
Zac Schumacher	2	Starter	2	Rob Hawkins
Diab Karim	3	Starter	3	Joe Coyd
Dan Anstey	4	Starter	4	Lewis King
Adam Tannock	5	Starter	5	Finley O'Neill
Cory Cannane	6	Interchange	6	Mason Billington
Brad Grove	7	Interchange	7	Luis Domingos
Peter Arbuckle	8	Interchange	8	Jack Brown
		Interchange
Brett Clark		Coach		Tom Coyd

== Broadcasting ==
Both Ashes games were streamed live by the NRL.

== See also ==
- 2025 Kangaroo tour of England
