= Adam Rigby =

English wheelchair rugby league player

Personal information
- Born: July 1992 (age 34) England

Playing information
Club
| Years | Team | Pld | T | G | FG | P |
|---|---|---|---|---|---|---|
| – | Wigan |
Representative
| Years | Team | Pld | T | G | FG | P |
| 2007–25 | England |

Adam Rigby is an English wheelchair rugby league player and referee who plays for Wigan Warriors in the RFL Wheelchair Super League. He is a former England international, having retired internationally in May 2025.

== Background ==
Adam Rigby is a disabled wheelchair rugby league player who was born with hereditary spastic paraplegia affecting joint mobility in his hips, knees, and ankles. As such he is a full time wheelchair user.

== Career ==
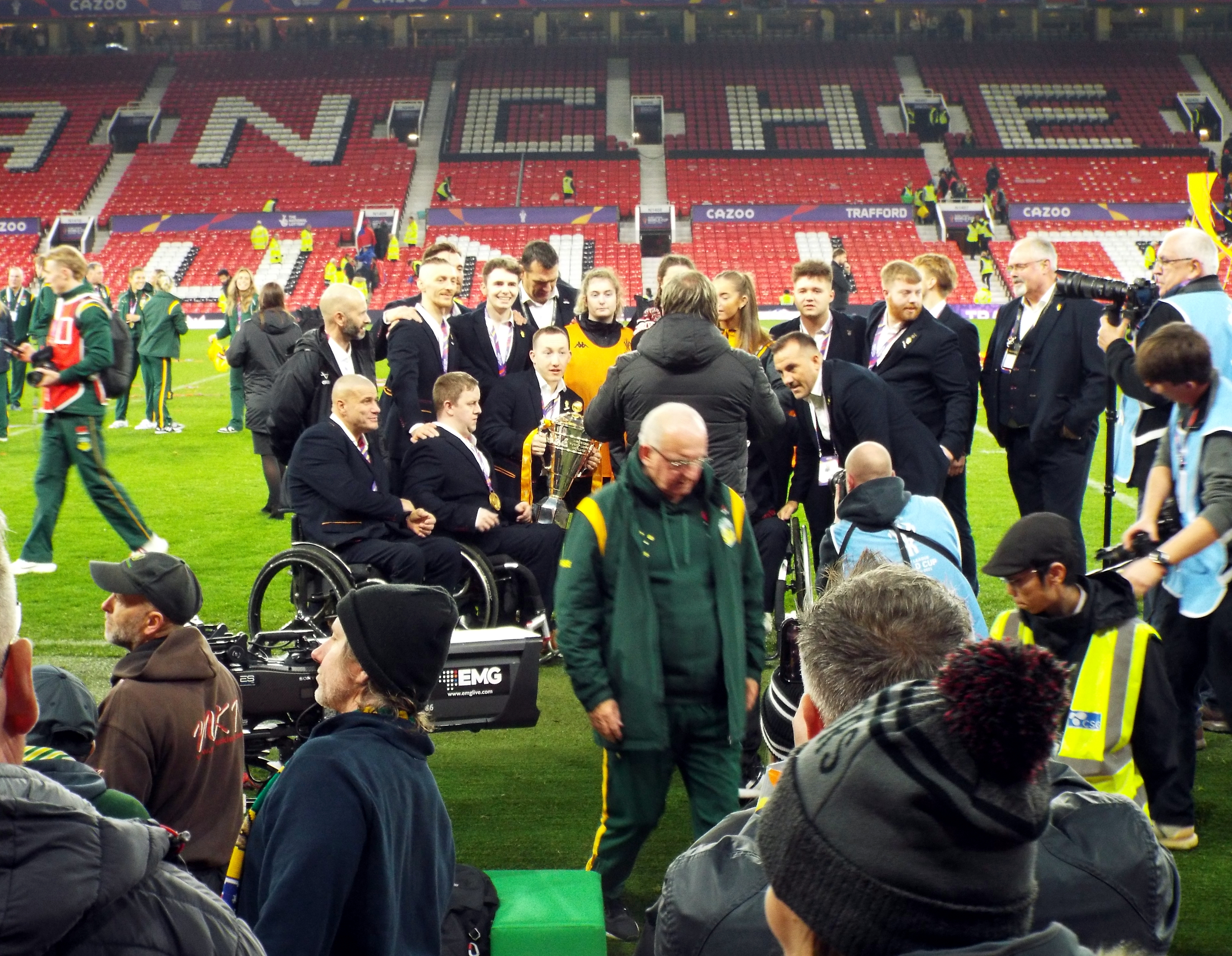
Rigby (not in view) with the England national wheelchair rugby league team, celebrating their 2021 World Cup victory at Old Trafford in 2022

=== Club ===
Rigby scored for Wigan Warriors in the club's inaugural Grand Final appearance in 2023, defeating Leeds Rhinos 50–42 to win the club's first title. The following year he scored two tries in the Challenge Cup Final, a 81–18 defeat to Catalans Dragons in 2024.

=== International ===
Rigby made his England debut in 2007 and represent them the following year at the inaugural Wheelchair Rugby League World Cup in 2008. England reached the final, beating Australia 44–12 in the final, finishing the tournament as champions. He again represents England at the 2013 tournament. This saw England finish as runners-up, losing to France in the final. Rigby missed the 2017, but returned for 2021. Rigby played throughout the tournament, but did not feature in the final which saw England reclaimed the World title, beating France 28–24. In November 2024, Rigby was made captain for what would be his final game before international retirement, a 58–28 victory over Spain.

=== Officiating ===
Rigby began officiating championship wheelchair rugby league games throughout 2024 before his international retirement in 2025. Shortly after his international retirement, Rigby was appointed as one of four match officials for the 2025 Celtic Cup, becoming the first full time wheelchair user to referee a senior international game.

== Honours ==
=== Wigan ===
- Super League:
  - Champions (1): 2023
- Challenge Cup:
  - Runner-up (1): 2024

=== England ===
- World Cup:
  - Champions (2): 2008, 2021
  - Runner-up (1): 2013
