= Lewis King =

English wheelchair rugby league player

Personal information
- Born: 1984/85 Temple Hill, Dartford, Kent, England, United Kingdom

Playing information
Club
Years	Team	Pld	T	G	FG	P
2016–21	Argonauts
2022–	London Roosters
	Total	0	0	0	0	0
Representative
Years	Team	Pld	T	G	FG	P
2019–	England
- As of 15 November 2026
Medals
Wheelchair rugby league
Representing England
World Cup
Winner	2021 England
Winner	2026 Australia

Lewis King is an English wheelchair rugby league player. He currently plays for London Roosters in the RFL Wheelchair Super League and the England national wheelchair rugby league team.

== Background ==
King is a disabled wheelchair rugby league player. In 2009, he suffered with a blood clot in his spinal cord leaving him unable to walk unaided. He began playing the sport in 2016. He had briefly played wheelchair basketball before switching to rugby league.

== Career ==
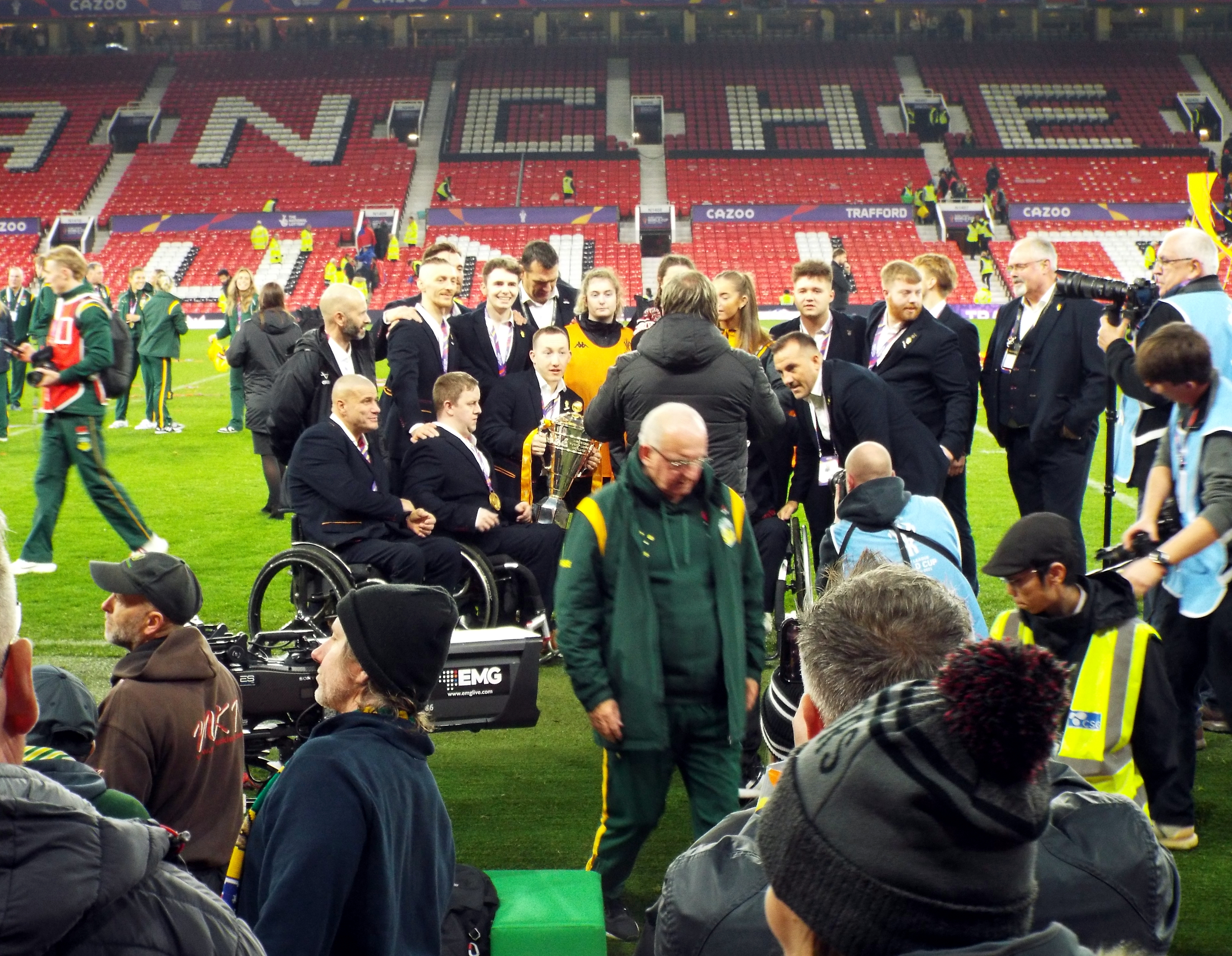
King (not in view) with the England national wheelchair rugby league team, celebrating their 2021 World Cup victory at Old Trafford in 2022

=== Club ===
King reached two Challenge Cup finals with Argonauts, losing out to Leeds Rhinos in 2019 and 2021. The following year, his club merged with Gravesend Dynamite and Medway Dragons to form London Roosters. In 2023, King became the inaugural Wheels of Steel winner. In 2025, King was described as a key man in the development of London Roosters ahead of his third Challenge Cup final, in which he scored a try despite losing to Halifax Panthers.

=== International ===
King was selected for his first international camp in 2018, before making his debut for the England national team the following year. He was selected for the 2021 Wheelchair Rugby League World Cup making his competition debut. King scored in the final beating France 28–24 to help England to their second World Cup victory. King was awarded the England captaincy ahead of the 2025 Wheelchair Ashes with Tom Halliwell sidelined through injury.

== Personal life ==
King supports West Ham United. In October 2024, he was appointed as an ambassador of RL Cares.

== Honours ==
=== England ===
- World Cup:
  - Champions (2): 2021, 2026

=== Individual ===
- Wheels of Steel:
  - Winners (1): 2023
