= Rob Hawkins (wheelchair rugby league) =

English wheelchair rugby league player

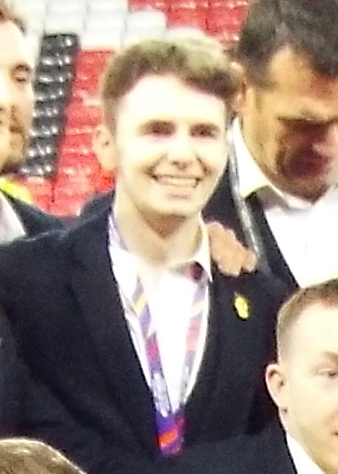

Personal information
- Full name: Robert Hawkins
- Born: c. 2001–2002 Halifax, West Yorkshire England

Playing information
Club
Years	Team	Pld	T	G	FG	P
2014–	Halifax Panthers
Representative
Years	Team	Pld	T	G	FG	P
2019–	England
Medals
Wheelchair rugby league
Representing England
World Cup
Winner	2021 England
Winner	2026 Australia

Rob Hawkins is an English wheelchair rugby league player who currently plays for Halifax Panthers in RFL Wheelchair Super League and the England national wheelchair rugby league team.

== Background ==
Rob Hawkins is a disabled wheelchair rugby league player. He suffers with chronic fatigue syndrome which he had diagnosed in 2014, after being bedridden for 18 months.

== Career ==
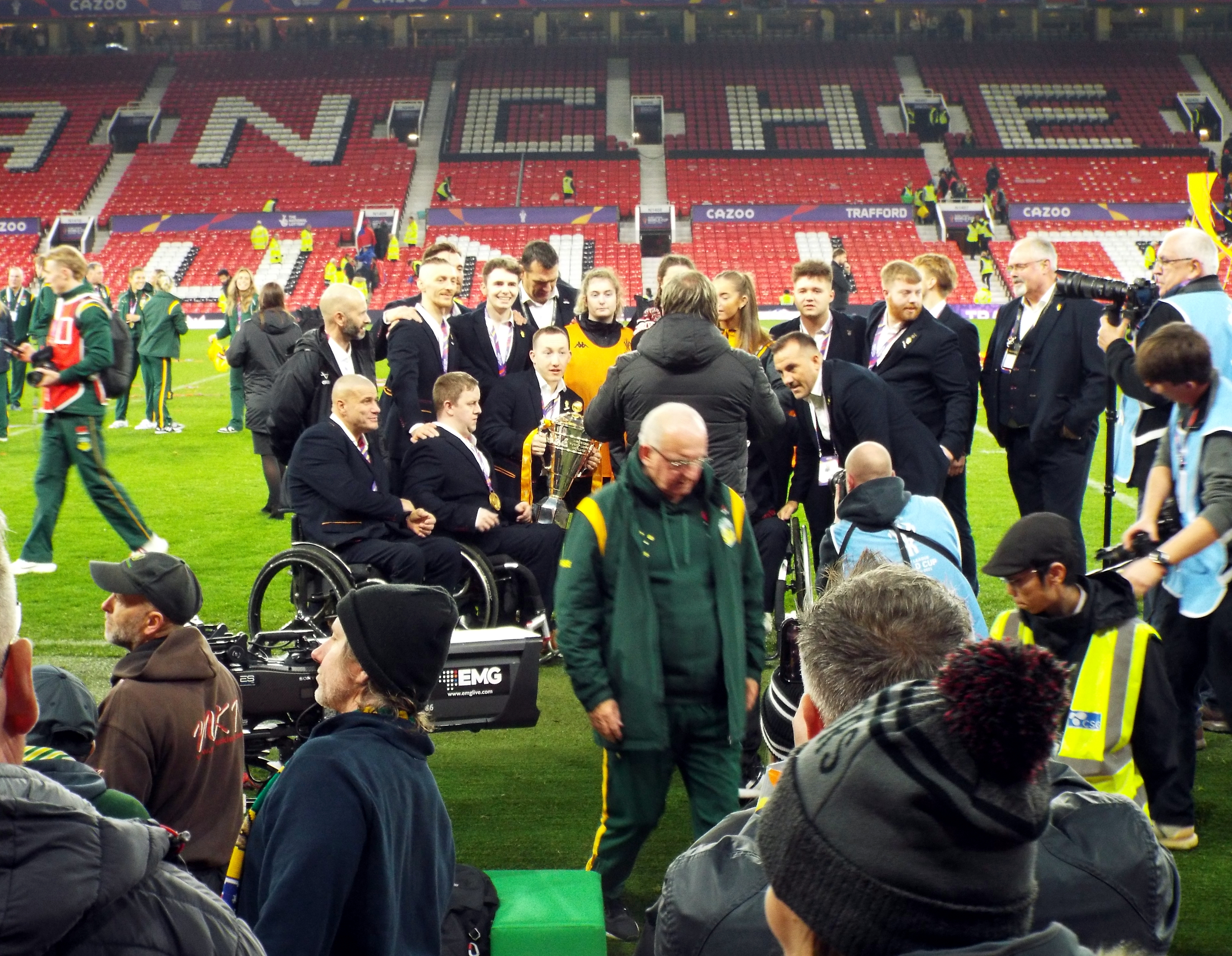
Hawkins (back row; third left) with the England national wheelchair rugby league team, celebrating their 2021 World Cup victory at Old Trafford in 2022

Rob Hawkins began playing wheelchair rugby league in 2014 following an improvement in his chronic fatigue syndrome.

In 2020, Rob Hawkins won Young Player of the Year for 2019 at the Wheelchair Rugby League Awards, after helping Halifax the inaugural 2019 Super League. He repeated this feat in February 2023, winning Player of the Year for the 2022 season, In which he won the 2022 Super League with Halifax, and doing so winning man of the match in the Grand Final. At the 2024 Man of Steel Awards, Hawkins was named as the Wheelchair Super League Young Player of the Year. In 2026, Hawkins won the Wheels of Steel award (Player of the Year).

=== International ===
Rob Hawkins made his England debut in 2019, at the tri-nations series against Wales and Scotland. Following a pandemic enforced break in the sport, Hawkins was chosen to represent England at the 2021 Wheelchair Rugby League World Cup. He received praise in England's second group game, scoring five tries in a 104–12 win over Spain which qualified England for the semi-finals. England reached the final, beating France 28–24. In 2024, Hawkins played in England's two match test series over France. He scored four tries in the home 66–33 victory, which also saw him win player of the match, before scoring a further two in the 28–32 away defeat. His international performances for the year was recognised with him being awarded the IRL Wheelchair Golden Boot, becoming the youngest player to win the award.

Hawkins was selected in the touring squad for the 2025 England wheelchair rugby league tour of Australia. Playing in all four matches, Hawkins scored eleven tries and six conversions, including five tries and five conversions in the two international matches against Australia. In December, Hawkins was awarded the IRL Wheelchair Golden Boot winner for a second successive year, becoming the first player across the men's, women's, and wheelchair disciplines to retain the award.

In 2026, Hawkins won the IRL Golden Boot for a third consecutive year.

== Personal life ==
In January 2023, Hawkins gave a talk at Shelf Junior and Infant School. In April of the same year, he opened the Children's Community Health Centre in Elland.

== Honours ==
=== Halifax ===
- Super League (and predecessor tournaments):
  - Champions (2): 2019, 2022, 2025, 2026
- Challenge Cup:
  - Champions (6): 2015, 2016, 2017, 2018, 2025, 2026

=== England ===
- World Cup:
  - Champions (2): 2021, 2026

=== Individual ===
- IRL Wheelchair Golden Boot
  - Winner (2): 2024, 2025, 2026
- Wheels of Steel:
  - Winner (2) 2022, 2026
- Super League Young Player of the Year:
  - Winner (2) 2019, 2024
