= Luis Domingos =

Portuguese wheelchair rugby league and basketball player

- Born: 14 October 1997 (age 29); Setubal, Lisbon, Portugal
- Basketball career

Career history
- 2011/2012–2019: Leeds Spiders
- 2019–2020: Varese
- 2020–2021: Basketmi Ferrol
- 2021–2022: Servigest Burgos
- 2022–2023: BC Gaia
- 2022–2023: Mohawks
- 2023–2023: Wakefield Whirlwinds
- 2023–present: Tees Valley Mohawks
- Portugal
- Rugby league career

Playing information
Club
Years	Team	Pld	T	G	FG	P
2011/12–19	Leeds Rhinos
2025–	Castleford Tigers
	Total	0	0	0	0	0
Representative
Years	Team	Pld	T	G	FG	P
2025–	England
Medals
Wheelchair rugby league
Representing England
Winner	2026 Australia

Luis Domingos is a Portuguese wheelchair rugby league player and former professional wheelchair basketball player who currently plays for Sheffield Eagles and the England national wheelchair rugby league team.

== Background ==
Domingos was born in Setubal, Portugal and is of Angolan decent. He became a wheelchair user after contracting polio as a child. At age 14, he and his family moved to Leeds where he took up both wheelchair basketball and wheelchair rugby league as a hobby, playing for Leeds Vipers and Leeds Rhinos respectively. It was here that Domingos was scouted the by Portugal's co-captain Pedro Bartol to take up wheelchair basketball professionally.

== Wheelchair basketball ==
In 2019, Domingos passed a two week trial with Varese in Italy's Serie A, he signed his first professional contract after being granted permission to complete the remainder of his healthcare qualification he was studying with Leeds City College online. Domingos later moved to Spain, playing for Basketmi Ferrol and then Servigest Burgos in the second and first tiers of the Spanish league respectively, before ending his career with BC Gaia in Portugal. He made several appearances for the Portugal national team during his stint in the sport.

== Between sports ==
In 2023, Domingos returned to England to complete a business management degree at the University of Huddersfield. During this time he continued playing wheelchair basketball with an amateur club in Wakefield, a team which shared facilities with Championship side Castleford Tigers, which resulted in him trying wheelchair rugby league.

== Wheelchair rugby league ==
In his first season back in wheelchair rugby league, Domingos was part of Castleford Tigers inaugural wheelchair team who won the Challenge Trophy in 2025, a Challenge Cup type competition for second tier clubs, in which Domingos scored the winning try.

In April that year, Domingos participated in a wheelchair rugby league festival hosted by the Rugby Football League in Nottingham. A festival held to scout potential new players for the England national team ahead of the 2025 Wheelchair Ashes. Impressing, and qualifying for England on residency, Domingos was one of 24 players invited to an intra-squad tri-series tournament in York acting as national team trials. He progressed to the second stage trials dubbed the "Future of England" game. Domingos was one of nine players advanced to the national performance squad for a training session and a behind closed doors trial in York on 13 July. In August, after a final training sessions with the national performance squad, he made the ten player Ashes squad, one of two uncapped players to do so.

== Honours ==
=== England ===
- World Cup:
  - Champions (1): 2026
