= Nathan Collins (wheelchair rugby league) =

English wheelchair rugby league player

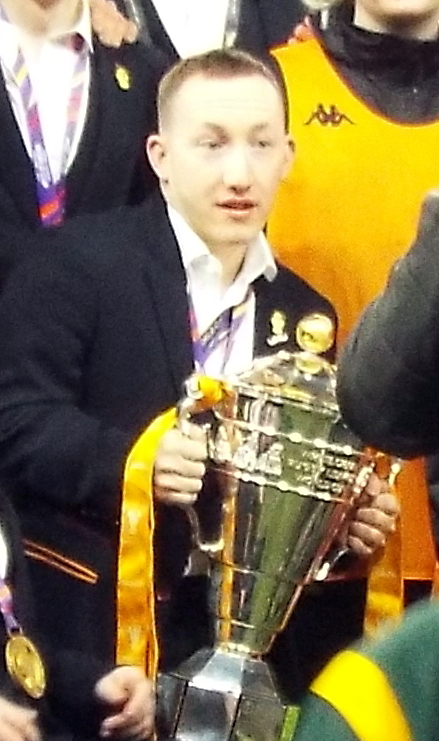

Personal information
- Born: 2000-2001 Swillington, West Yorkshire, England

Playing information
Club
Years	Team	Pld	T	G	FG	P
2011–	Leeds Rhinos
Representative
Years	Team	Pld	T	G	FG	P
2017–	England
Medals
Wheelchair rugby league
Representing England
World Cup
Runner-up	2017 France
Winner	2021 England
Winner	2026 Australia

Nathan Collins is an English wheelchair rugby league player who currently plays for Leeds Rhinos in RFL Wheelchair Super League and the England national wheelchair rugby league team.

== Background ==
Nathan Collins is a disabled wheelchair rugby league player. He was born with dwarfism. His sporting journey began in 2010, aged 10, with wheelchair basketball before transferring to rugby six months later. Outside of sport, Collins works for Leeds City Council.

== Career ==
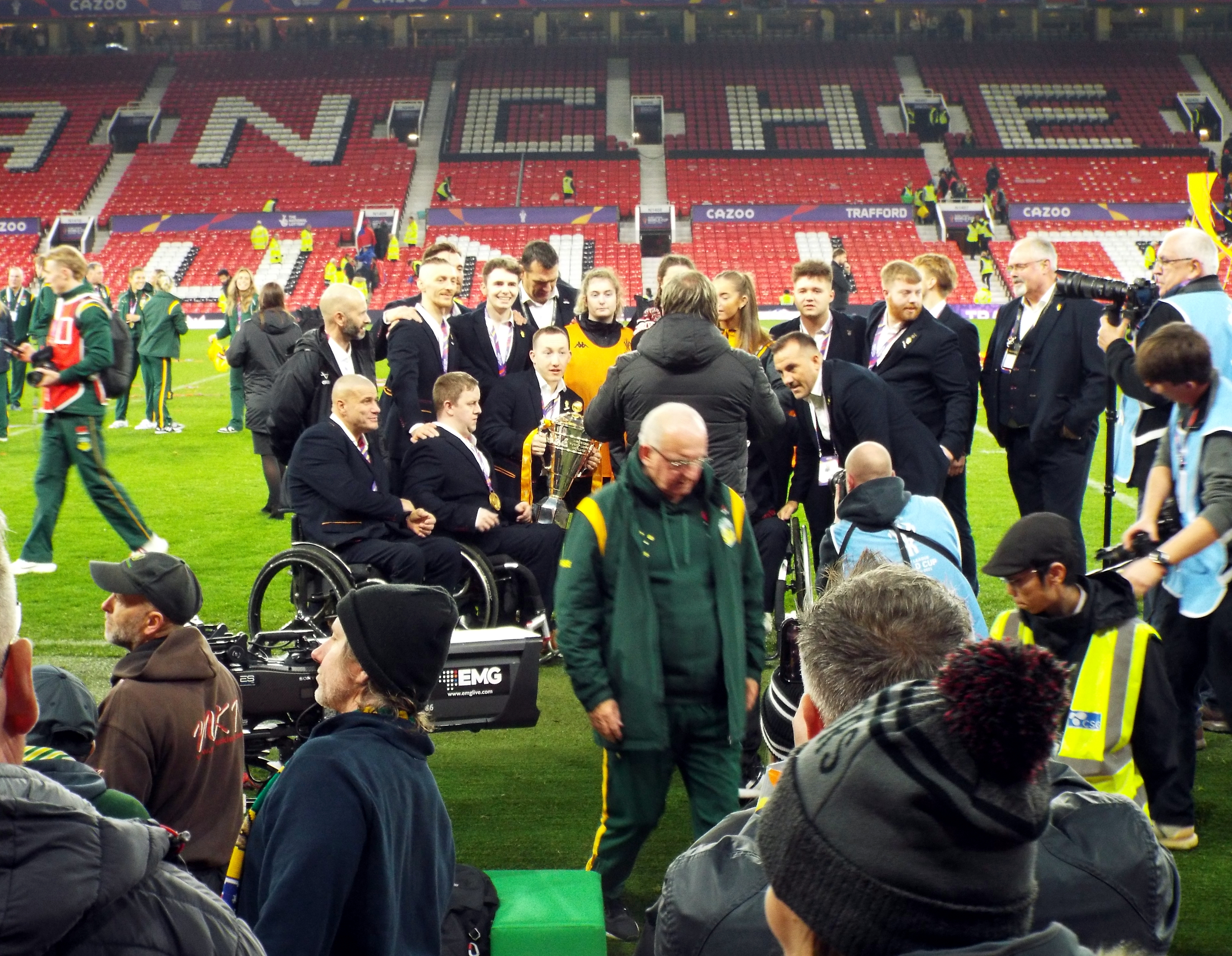
Collins (front row; third left) with the England national wheelchair rugby league team, celebrating their 2021 World Cup victory at Old Trafford in 2022

=== Club ===
Nathan Collins joined Leeds Rhinos in 2011, aged 10. He was part of the Leeds squad which won their first ever national championship in 2018. He again was a key player in Leeds's 2021 Super League Grand Final victory against Leyland Warriors. At the Wheelchair Rugby League Awards he was named as the 2022 Young Player of the Year.

=== International ===
Collins made his England debut aged 16 at the Wheelchair Rugby League World Cup in 2017 where England finished runners-up losing to France in the final. He again played in the 2021 tournament, where England finished the tournament as champions, beating France 28–24. He played in England's 2023 international series wheelchair game against France.

== Honours ==
=== Leeds ===
- Super League (and predecessor tournaments):
  - Champions (2): 2018, 2021
- Challenge Cup:
  - Champions (3): 2019, 2021, 2022
- League Leaders' Shield:
  - Champions (4): 2019, 2021, 2022, 2023

=== England ===
- World Cup:
  - Champions (2): 2021, 2026
  - Runner-up (1): 2017

=== Individual ===
- Wheelchair Rugby League Awards
  - Young Player of the Year: 2022
