= 2026 RFL Wheelchair Super League =

2025 wheelchair rugby league competition in the United Kingdom

- League: Wheelchair Super League
- Duration: 11 April – 20 September 2026
- Teams: 8

2026
- Champions: Halifax Panthers
- League Leaders: Halifax Panthers

The 2026 Wheelchair Super League (also known as the 2026 Betfred Wheelchair Super League for sponsorship purposes) was the seventh season of the Rugby Football League (RFL) premier wheelchair rugby league competition.

The defending champions were Halifax Panthers who won the 2025 Grand Final, defeating London Roosters 42–32.

In December 2024, the RFL announced that the 2026 Super League season would have eight teams following successful applications of Edinburgh Giants and Sheffield Eagles to join the competition in 2025, with Warrington Wolves joining in 2026. In November 2025, the RFL announced that Bradford Bulls would take the place of Warrington in 2026. Teams played fourteen fixtures during the regular season, playing each of the other teams twice. At the end of the regular season, the top four teams advanced to the play-off semi-finals with the winners advancing to the Grand Final.

The Grand Final took place at the Belle Vue Leisure Centre, Manchester, on Sunday, 20 September. Halifax Panthers defeated Leeds Rhinos 64–24 to complete back-to-back trebles.

== Teams ==
Locations of the 2026 Wheelchair Super League teams in England

| Team | 2025 position | Stadium |
|---|---|---|
| Bradford Bulls | Champ. | Sedbergh Leisure Centre, Bradford |
| Edinburgh Giants | 6th | University of Edinburgh, Edinburgh |
| Halifax Panthers | 1st | Sedbergh Leisure Centre, Bradford |
| Hull F.C. | 4th | Hull FC Centre of Excellence, Hull |
| Leeds Rhinos | 5th* | Leeds Beckett University sports arena, Leeds |
| London Roosters | 2nd | Barking Sporthouse & Gym |
| Sheffield Eagles | 7th | Ponds Forge International Sports Centre, Sheffield |
| Wigan Warriors | 3rd | Robin Park Arena, Wigan |

== Results ==
The regular season commenced on 11 April. The fourteen rounds of matches ran until 5 September.

All times are British Summer Time (UTC+01:00)

Source:RFL Match Centre

=== Regular season ===
Betfred Wheelchair Super League: round one
| Home | Score | Away | Match Information | |
| Home | Score | Away | Date | Venue |
|---|---|---|---|---|
| Bradford Bulls | 18–99 | Halifax Panthers | 11 April | Sedbergh Sports and Leisure Centre |
| Edinburgh Giants | 12–116 | Leeds Rhinos | 11 April | Edinburgh Sport - The Pleasance |
| Hull F.C. | 30–70 | London Roosters | 11 April | Allam Sports Centre |
| Wigan Warriors | 75–20 | Sheffield Eagles | 11 April, 16:15 | Robin Park Arena |
Match reports:

Betfred Wheelchair Super League: round two
| Home | Score | Away | Match Information | |
| Home | Score | Away | Date | Venue |
|---|---|---|---|---|
| Edinburgh Giants | 30–32 | Hull F.C. | 25 April | Edinburgh Sport - The Pleasance |
| London Roosters | 80–40 | Leeds Rhinos | 26 April | Redbridge Sports Centre |
| Halifax Panthers | 76–12 | Wigan Warriors | 25 April | Sedbergh Sports and Leisure Centre |
| Sheffield Eagles | 74–46 | Bradford Bulls | 26 April, 11:45 | Ponds Forge International Sports Centre |
Match reports:

Betfred Wheelchair Super League: round three
| Home | Score | Away | Match Information | |
| Home | Score | Away | Date | Venue |
|---|---|---|---|---|
| Bradford Bulls | 12–108 (Note: The score of the 16 May match between Bradford Bulls and London Roosters was initially recorded as 12–114, but was later reported as having been revised to 12–108.) | London Roosters | 16 May | Sedbergh Sports and Leisure Centre |
| Leeds Rhinos | 60–26 | Wigan Warriors | 16 May | The Edge |
| Edinburgh Giants | 20–88 | Halifax Panthers | 17 May | Edinburgh Sport - The Pleasance |
| Sheffield Eagles | 44–34 | Hull F.C. | 17 May, 13:45 | All Saints Sports Centre |
Match reports:

Betfred Wheelchair Super League: round four
| Home | Score | Away | Match Information | |
| Home | Score | Away | Date | Venue |
|---|---|---|---|---|
| Wigan Warriors | 124–13 | Bradford Bulls | 6 June, 13:15 | |
| Hull F.C. | 16–100 | Leeds Rhinos | 13 June, 14:30 | |
| Halifax Panthers | 99–22 | Sheffield Eagles | 14 June, 15:00 | Sedbergh Sports and Leisure Centre |
| Edinburgh Giants | 28–52 | London Roosters | 18 July, 14:00 | York Sports Centre - University of York |
Match reports:

Betfred Wheelchair Super League: round five
| Home | Score | Away | Match Information | |
| Home | Score | Away | Date | Venue |
|---|---|---|---|---|
| London Roosters | 72–24 | Sheffield Eagles | 20 June, 14:00 | Barking Sporthouse & Gym |
| Bradford Bulls | 30–68 | Hull F.C. | 20 June, 14:00 | Sedbergh Sports and Leisure Centre |
| Edinburgh Giants | 32–76 | Wigan Warriors | 20 June, 14:30 | |
| Leeds Rhinos | 46–52 | Halifax Panthers | 20 June, 14:30 | |
Match reports:

Betfred Wheelchair Super League: round six
| Home | Score | Away | Match Information | |
| Home | Score | Away | Date | Venue |
|---|---|---|---|---|
| Leeds Rhinos | 150–4 | Bradford Bulls | 27 June, 14:30 | |
| Edinburgh Giants | 38–70 | Sheffield Eagles | 27 June, 14:30 | Edinburgh Sport - The Pleasance |
| Halifax Panthers | 68–30 | London Roosters | 27 June, 15:00 | Sedbergh Sports and Leisure Centre |
| Hull F.C. | 0–24 | Wigan Warriors | 26 July, 14:30 | |
Match reports:

Betfred Wheelchair Super League: round seven
| Home | Score | Away | Match Information | |
| Home | Score | Away | Date | Venue |
|---|---|---|---|---|
| Edinburgh Giants | 78–42 | Bradford Bulls | 4 July, 13:00 | |
| Wigan Warriors | 31–22 | London Roosters | 4 July, 14:00 | |
| Sheffield Eagles | 32–62 | Leeds Rhinos | 5 July, 11:45 | Ponds Forge International Sports Centre |
| Halifax Panthers | 99–6 | Hull F.C. | 5 July, 15:00 | Sedbergh Sports and Leisure Centre |
Match reports:

Betfred Wheelchair Super League: round eight
| Home | Score | Away | Match Information | |
| Home | Score | Away | Date | Venue |
|---|---|---|---|---|
| Sheffield Eagles | 16–92 | Halifax Panthers | 3 May, 11:45 | Ponds Forge International Sports Centre |
| Bradford Bulls | 18–108 | Wigan Warriors | 11 July | Sedbergh Sports and Leisure Centre |
| London Roosters | 58–22 | Hull F.C. | 11 July | |
| Leeds Rhinos | 30–74 | Edinburgh Giants | 11 July | |
Match reports:

Betfred Wheelchair Super League: round nine
| Home | Score | Away | Match Information | |
| Home | Score | Away | Date | Venue |
|---|---|---|---|---|
| Halifax Panthers | 62–42 | Leeds Rhinos | 18 July, 15:00 | Sedbergh Sports and Leisure Centre |
| Sheffield Eagles | 30–86 | Wigan Warriors | 19 July, 11:45 | Ponds Forge International Sports Centre |
| Hull F.C. | 50–43 | Bradford Bulls | 19 July, 12:00 | |
| London Roosters | 68–6 | Edinburgh Giants | 19 July, 12:00 | York Sports Centre - University of York |
Match reports:

Betfred Wheelchair Super League: round ten
| Home | Score | Away | Match Information | |
| Home | Score | Away | Date | Venue |
|---|---|---|---|---|
| Bradford Bulls | 98–12 | Sheffield Eagles | 1 August, 13:00 | Sedbergh Sports and Leisure Centre |
| Leeds Rhinos | 58–46 | London Roosters | 1 August, 14:00 | |
| Wigan Warriors | 60–18 | Halifax Panthers | 2 August, 13:00 | |
| Hull F.C. | 20–64 | Edinburgh Giants | 2 August, 14:00 | |
Match reports:

Betfred Wheelchair Super League: round eleven
| Home | Score | Away | Match Information | |
| Home | Score | Away | Date | Venue |
|---|---|---|---|---|
| London Roosters | 74–6 | Bradford Bulls | 8 August, 12:30 | |
| Wigan Warriors | 84–24 | Hull F.C. | 8 August, 14:00 | |
| Leeds Rhinos | 74–42 | Sheffield Eagles | 8 August, 14:30 | |
| Halifax Panthers | 98–32 | Edinburgh Giants | 8 August, 15:00 | Sedbergh Sports and Leisure Centre |
Match reports:

Betfred Wheelchair Super League: round twelve
| Home | Score | Away | Match Information | |
| Home | Score | Away | Date | Venue |
|---|---|---|---|---|
| Sheffield Eagles | 30–48 | Edinburgh Giants | 15 August, 12:45 | Ponds Forge International Sports Centre |
| Bradford Bulls | 6–100 | Leeds Rhinos | 15 August, 13:30 | Sedbergh Sports and Leisure Centre |
| London Roosters | 50–30 | Wigan Warriors | 15 August, 14:00 | |
| Hull F.C. | 18–99 | Halifax Panthers | 15 August, 14:30 | |
Match reports:

Betfred Wheelchair Super League: round thirteen
| Home | Score | Away | Match Information | |
| Home | Score | Away | Date | Venue |
|---|---|---|---|---|
| Sheffield Eagles | 36–72 | London Roosters | 22 August, 11:45 | Ponds Forge International Sports Centre |
| Wigan Warriors | 89–16 | Edinburgh Giants | 22 August, 14:00 | |
| Halifax Panthers | 99–28 | Bradford Bulls | 22 August, 15:00 | Sedbergh Sports and Leisure Centre |
| Leeds Rhinos | 122–8 | Hull F.C. | 23 August | |
Match reports:

Betfred Wheelchair Super League: round fourteen
| Home | Score | Away | Match Information | |
| Home | Score | Away | Date | Venue |
|---|---|---|---|---|
| Bradford Bulls | 42–70 | Edinburgh Giants | 5 September, 13:30 | Sedbergh Sports and Leisure Centre |
| London Roosters | 30–36 | Halifax Panthers | 5 September, 14:00 | |
| Wigan Warriors | 34–50 | Leeds Rhinos | 5 September, 14:00 | |
| Hull F.C. | 52–72 | Sheffield Eagles | 5 September, 15:00 | Allam Sports Centre |
Match reports:

==== Regular season table ====
| Pos | Team | Pld | W | D | L | PF | PA | PD | Pts | Qualification |
|---|---|---|---|---|---|---|---|---|---|---|
| 1 | Halifax Panthers | 14 | 13 | 0 | 1 | 1085 | 380 | +705 | 26 | play-offs |
| 2 | Leeds Rhinos | 14 | 10 | 0 | 4 | 1050 | 494 | +556 | 20 | play-offs |
| 3 | Wigan Warriors | 14 | 10 | 0 | 4 | 859 | 429 | +430 | 20 | play-offs |
| 4 | London Roosters | 14 | 10 | 0 | 4 | 838 | 427 | +411 | 20 | play-offs |
| 5 | Edinburgh Giants | 14 | 5 | 0 | 9 | 548 | 853 | −305 | 10 | |
| 6 | Sheffield Eagles | 14 | 4 | 0 | 10 | 524 | 948 | −424 | 8 | |
| 7 | Hull F.C. | 14 | 3 | 0 | 11 | 380 | 939 | −559 | 6 | |
| 8 | Bradford Bulls | 14 | 1 | 0 | 13 | 406 | 1220 | −814 | 2 | |

Source: Super League

=== Play-offs ===
Four teams qualified for the play-off group stage played on the weekend of 12 September, with the winners qualifying for the Grand Final played on 20 September.

==== Semi-finals ====
Betfred Wheelchair Super League: Semi-finals
| Team 1 | Score | Team 2 | Match Information | |
| Team 1 | Score | Team 2 | Date | Venue |
|---|---|---|---|---|
| Halifax Panthers | 51–32 | London Roosters | 12 September | Oldham Leisure Centre |
| Leeds Rhinos | 76–34 | Wigan Warriors | 13 September | Leeds Beckett University |
Match reports:

==== Grand Final ====
Betfred Wheelchair Super League: Grand Final
| Team 1 | Score | Team 2 | Match Information | |
| Team 1 | Score | Team 2 | Date | Venue |
|---|---|---|---|---|
| Halifax Panthers | 64–24 | Leeds Rhinos | 20 September, 17:30 | Belle Vue Leisure Centre, Manchester |
Match reports:
