= Wayne Boardman =

English wheelchair rugby league player

Personal information
- Born: 1974/75

Playing information
Club
Years	Team	Pld	T	G	FG	P
–	Halifax Panthers
Representative
Years	Team	Pld	T	G	FG	P
2007–25	England

Wayne Boardman is an English wheelchair rugby league player-coach. He currently plays for Halifax Panthers in the RFL Wheelchair Super League, to whom he captains. He has previously represented the England national wheelchair rugby league team.

He is a product of the Wakefield Trinity academy in the running game and has also briefly played for Dewsbury Rams. At age 29 he suffered an accident and became a wheelchair user, joing the wheelchair rugby league and playing wheelchair basketball at a local club.

== Career ==
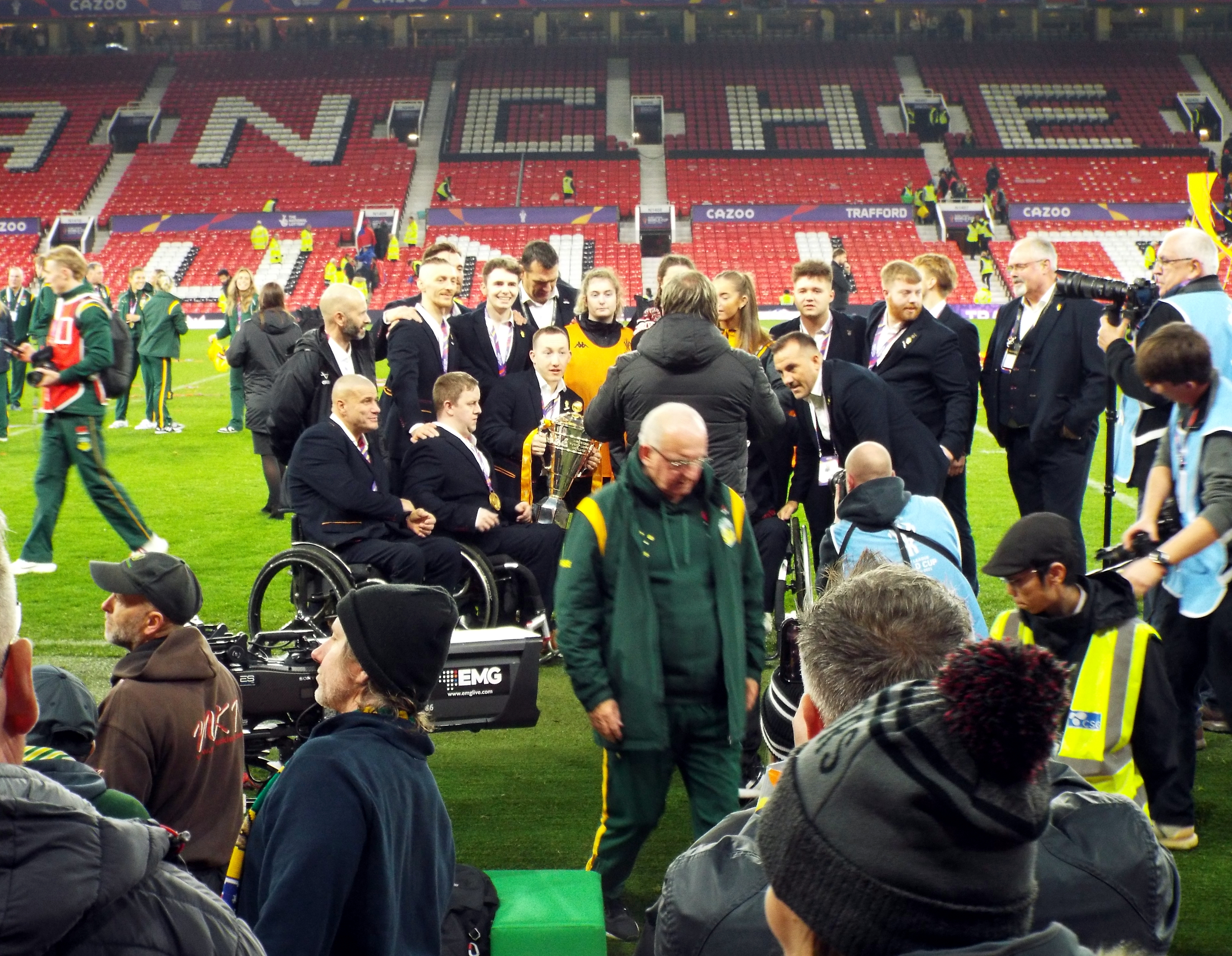
Boardman (front row; first left) with the England national wheelchair rugby league team, celebrating their 2021 World Cup victory at Old Trafford in 2022

=== Club ===
Wayne Boardman has played his entire career to date at Halifax Panthers. He played in both 2015 and 2016 domestic wheelchair finals for Halifax in which the team won both. Boardman also won the inaugural 2019 Super League title with Halifax.

=== International ===
Wayne Boardman is the England national teams's first ever player, having the heritage number "1". He has represented the country at the 2017 Wheelchair Rugby League World Cup. where he finished runners-up with England to France in the final. He again was selected for the 2021 tournament. this time beating France 28–24 in the final. On 4 March 2026, Boardman announced his retirement from international wheelchair rugby league.

== Doping issue ==
In June 2021, Boardman was given a 13 month suspension from the sport for having oxandrolone in his urine. This decision was overturned by the court of Arbitration for Sport, deeming him to have "no fault or negligence" surrounding the presence of the steroid.

== Honours ==
=== Halifax ===
- Super League (and predecessor tournaments):
  - Champions (4): 2015, 2016, 2019, 2022
- Challenge Cup:
  - Champions (4): 2015, 2016, 2017, 2018

=== England ===
- World Cup:
  - Champions (1): 2021
  - Runner-up (1): 2017
