= Wigan Warriors Wheelchair =

Wheelchair rugby league team

Wigan Warriors
Club information
- Full name: Wigan Warriors Wheelchair Rugby League
- Nickname(s): The Cherry and Whites; The Pies; The Riversiders
- Colours: Cherry and White
- Founded: Thursday 21st November 1872; 153 years ago (Club Founded); 2018; 8 years ago (Wheelchair team formed as Wigan and District Wheelchair RL team); 2022; 4 years ago (Wheelchair team officially becomes part of the Wigan Warriors club as Wigan Warriors Wheelchair Rugby League)
- Website: wiganwarriors.com

Current details
- Ground: Robin Park Arena
- Chairman: Chris Brookes
- Coach: Phil Roberts
- Captain: Adam Rigby
- Competition: Super League
- 2026: 3rd

Uniforms
Home colours	Away colours

Records
- Championships: 1 (2023)
- Challenge Cups: 0
- European Club Challenges: 0

Wigan Warriors Wheelchair Rugby League is an English wheelchair rugby league team based in Wigan, Greater Manchester and is the official wheelchair rugby league team of the Wigan Warriors club. The team competes in the RFL Wheelchair Super League. The club has played its home games at the Robin Park Arena since its formation in 2018 when it was under the name "Wigan and District Wheelchair RL team" until being taken over by Wigan Warriors in 2022.

== History ==
Wigan Warriors formed their wheelchair team in early 2022, taking over Wigan and District Wheelchair RL team, and was granted Super League status for their inaugural season. Wigan finished third in 2022 and lost to Halifax Panthers in the semi-finals. The following year 'Wigan Warriors A' (the club's reserve side) entered the Championship finished second and as runners-up in the Championship Final. Meanwhile, their first team won their inaugural league championship beating Leeds Rhinos in the Grand Final after a consecutive third-place finish in regular season. They lost their inaugural European Club Challenge to Catalans Dragons.

== Teams ==
The Wigan Warriors wheelchair rugby league team are one of 11 teams operated by Wigan Warriors, the others are:

- Men's first team
- Men's Reserves
- Men's Academy (under 18s)
- Men's Scholarship (under 16s)
- College development squad (men and women aged 16–18)
- Women's first team
- Women's academy (under 19s)
- Physical disability
- Learning disability
- Wheelchair (mixed)
- Wheelchair A (wheelchair reserve team)
- Touch Rugby

== Seasons ==
Wigan Warriors

Season	League										Challenge Cup	European Club Challenge
Season	Division	P	W	D	L	F	A	Pts	Pos	Play-offs	Challenge Cup	European Club Challenge
2022	Super League	12	7	1	4	836	516	15	3rd	Lost in semi-final	SF	No competition
2023	Super League	10	5	5	0	605	361	10	3rd	Champions	RR	Did not qualify
2024	Super League	8	3	0	5	280	316	6	4th	Lost in semi-final	RU	Runners-up
2025	Super League	6	3	0	3	226	222	6	4th	—N/a	QF	No competition
2025	SL play-offs	3	1	0	2	124	154	2	3rd	—N/a	QF	No competition
2026	Super League	14	10	0	4	859	429	20	3rd	Lost in semi-final	SF	No competition

Wigan Warriors A

Season	League									
Season	Division	P	W	D	L	F	A	Pts	Pos	Play-offs
2023	Championship	10	8	2	0	516	350	16	2nd	Lost in Championship Final

== Honours ==
=== Leagues ===
- Wheelchair Super League

Winners (1): 2023
