= 2025 Ashes =

The 2025 Ashes may refer to:

== Cricket ==
- The 2025–26 Ashes series
- The 2024–25 Women's Ashes series

== Rugby league ==
- The 2025 Kangaroo tour of England
- The 2025 England wheelchair rugby league tour of Australia
