= NRL Wheelchair Championship =

The NRL Wheelchair Championship is an elite level wheelchair rugby league competition for teams in Australia. The inaugural edition took place in 2025.

The competition is the third elite level domestic competition in the sport after France's Elite 1 and the United Kingdom's RFL Wheelchair Super League.

== 2025 season ==
The inaugural 2025 event was contested by seven teams and was played between 31 October and 2 November at the Gold Coast Sports and Leisure Centre in Gold Coast, Queensland. The tournament was opened and closed by both tests of the 2025 Wheelchair Ashes.

=== Table ===
Pos	Team	Pld	W	D	L	PF	PA	PD	Pts	Qualification
1	Australian Capital Territory	6	6	0	0	282	40	+242	12	Advance to final
2	New South Wales	6	4	0	2	122	88	+34	8	Advance to final
3	Queensland	6	4	0	2	114	114	0	8	
4	New Zealand	6	3	0	3	138	90	+48	6	
5	Queensland Reserves	6	3	0	3	104	136	−32	6	
6	Affiliated States	6	1	0	5	42	174	−132	2	
7	(Victoria (state)) Victoria	6	0	0	6	40	200	−160	0	

Updated to match(es) played on complete 2 November 2025. Source: Play Rugby League

=== Fixtures ===
Opening game

- Ashes Test 1 – Australia 28–56 England

Round 1

Date; Time	Team 1	Score	Team 2	Court
31 October; 10:00	New South Wales	4–52	Australian Capital Territory	Showcourt
31 October; 10:00	(Victoria (state)) Victoria	6–12	Affiliated States	Court 2
31 October; 11:00	New Zealand	24–14	Queensland Reserves	Showcourt
Round Bye: Queensland				Ref:

Round 2

Date; Time	Team 1	Score	Team 2	Court
31 October; 12:00	New South Wales	40–8	(Victoria (state)) Victoria	Showcourt
31 October; 12:00	Australian Capital Territory	48–0	Affiliated States	Court 2
31 October; 13:15	New Zealand	10–24	Queensland	Showcourt
Round Bye: Queensland Reserves				Ref:

Round 3

Date; Time	Team 1	Score	Team 2	Court
31 October; 14:45	New South Wales	34–6	Affiliated States	Showcourt
31 October; 14:45	Australian Capital Territory	34–8	(Victoria (state)) Victoria	Court 2
31 October; 16:00	Queensland Reserves	6–28	Queensland	Showcourt
Round Bye: New Zealand				Ref:

Round 4

Date; Time	Team 1	Score	Team 2	Court
1 November; 10:00	New South Wales	18–0	New Zealand	Showcourt
1 November; 10:00	Australian Capital Territory	52–6	Queensland Reserves	Court 2
1 November; 11:15	(Victoria (state)) Victoria	0–26	Queensland	Showcourt
Round Bye: Affiliated States

Round 5

Date; Time	Team 1	Score	Team 2	Court
1 November; 12:15	New South Wales	6–16	Queensland Reserves	Showcourt
1 November; 12:15	Australian Capital Territory	22–18	New Zealand	Court 2
1 November; 13:15	Affiliated States	4–26	Queensland	Showcourt
Round Bye: (Victoria (state)) Victoria

Round 6

Date; Time	Team 1	Score	Team 2	Court
1 November; 14:15	(Victoria (state)) Victoria	6–50	New Zealand	Showcourt
1 November; 14:15	Affiliated States	14–24	Queensland Reserves	Court 2
1 November; 15:15	Queensland	6–20	New South Wales	Showcourt
Round Bye: Australian Capital Territory

Round 7

Date; Time	Team 1	Score	Team 2	Court
2 November; 10:00	(Victoria (state)) Victoria	12–38	Queensland Reserves	Showcourt
2 November; 10:00	Australian Capital Territory	74–4	Queensland	Court 2
2 November; 11:00	Affiliated States	6–36	New Zealand	Showcourt
Round Bye: New South Wales				Ref:

Exhibition match

- Gold Coast Titans vs Brisbane Broncos

Final

Date; Time	Team 1	Score	Team 2	Court
2 November; 13:00	Australian Capital Territory	42–4	New South Wales	Showcourt
Ref:

Closing game

- Ashes Test 2 – Australia 42–48 England

== 2026 season ==
The 2026 event was again contested by seven teams and was played at the Gold Coast Sports and Leisure Centre in Gold Coast, Queensland, this time between 10 and 12 July.

=== Table ===
Pos	Team	Pld	W	D	L	PF	PA	PD	Pts	Qualification
1	New South Wales	6	6	0	0	244	38	+206	12	Advance to final
2	North Queensland	6	5	0	1	306	54	+252	10	Advance to final
3	Queensland	6	4	0	2	190	148	+42	8	Advance to third place playoff
4	Australian Capital Territory	6	3	0	3	122	120	+2	6	Advance to third place playoff
5	New Zealand	6	2	0	4	108	118	−10	4	
6	Affiliated States	6	1	0	5	40	282	−242	2	
7	(Victoria (state)) Victoria	6	0	0	6	24	274	−250	0	

Updated to match(es) played on complete 12 July 2026. Source: [ Source]

=== Fixtures ===
Round 1

Date	Team 1	Score	Team 2
10 July	New South Wales	38–6	New Zealand
10 July	Australian Capital Territory	40–0	(Victoria (state)) Victoria
10 July	Queensland	54–12	Affiliated States
Round Bye: North Queensland

Round 2

Date	Team 1	Score	Team 2
10 July	North Queensland	40–12	New Zealand
10 July	New South Wales	34–4	Australian Capital Territory
10 July	Affiliated States	14–12	(Victoria (state)) Victoria
Round Bye: Queensland

Round 1/2 bye game

Date	Team 1	Score	Team 2
10 July	North Queensland	62–12	Queensland

Round 3

Date	Team 1	Score	Team 2
11 July	New South Wales	38–10	Queensland
11 July	New Zealand	26–0	Affiliated States
11 July	North Queensland	38–4	Australian Capital Territory
Round Bye: (Victoria (state)) Victoria

Round 4

Date	Team 1	Score	Team 2
11 July	New Zealand	44–0	(Victoria (state)) Victoria
11 July	Queensland	28–14	Australian Capital Territory
11 July	New South Wales	60–0	Affiliated States
Round Bye: North Queensland

Round 3/4 bye game

Date	Team 1	Score	Team 2
11 July	North Queensland	62–4	(Victoria (state)) Victoria

Round 5

Date	Team 1	Score	Team 2
11 July	Australian Capital Territory	16–6	New Zealand
11 July	New South Wales	22–18	North Queensland
11 July	Queensland	62–8	(Victoria (state)) Victoria
Round Bye: Affiliated States

Round 6

Date	Team 1	Score	Team 2
12 July	New South Wales	52–0	(Victoria (state)) Victoria
12 July	North Queensland	86–0	Affiliated States
12 July	Queensland	24–14	New Zealand
Round Bye: Australian Capital Territory

Round 5/6 bye game

Date	Team 1	Score	Team 2
11 July	Australian Capital Territory	44–14	Affiliated States

Third-place playoff

Date	Team 1	Score	Team 2
12 July	Australian Capital Territory	18–6	Queensland

Final

Date	Team 1	Score	Team 2
12 July	New South Wales	28–18	North Queensland
