= Treble (rugby league) =

Term in the British rugby league

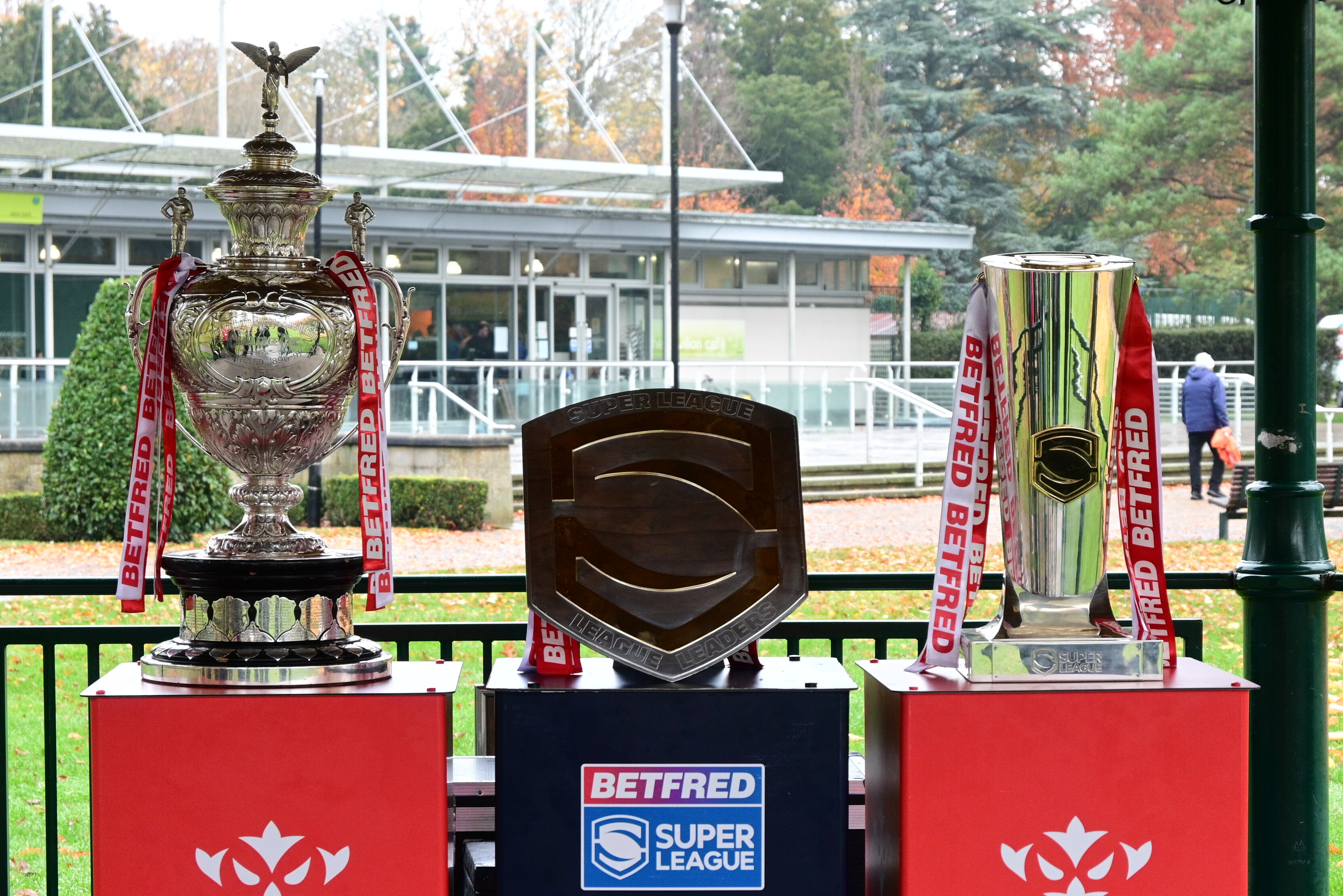
Trophies of the Challenge Cup and the Super League (League Leaders' Shield and Grand Final), the British rugby league treble.

In British rugby league, winning the Treble currently refers to winning the Super League Grand Final, League Leaders' Shield, and Challenge Cup in the same season. Up until 1973 this was achieved by winning the Championship Final, finishing top of the league during the regular season, and winning the Challenge Cup.

Between 1973 and 1996, following the abolition of the Championship Final, the league leaders were declared season champions. In this era, the Premiership was the third trophy required for the treble.

Only six teams have completed the treble, and it has only been achieved five times during the Super League era. Wigan Warriors are the most successful team, winning the treble on four occasions.

== Men's Treble ==
=== Bradford Bulls ===
==== 2003 ====
Bradford Bulls became the first team of the Super League era to win the treble in 2003. They beat Leeds Rhinos 22–20 in the 2003 Challenge Cup Final, won the League Leaders' Shield at the end of the season (the first time the current trophy was awarded) and completed the treble by beating Wigan Warriors 25–12 in the 2003 Super League Grand Final.

=== Huddersfield Giants ===
==== 1912–13 ====
Huddersfield Giants were the first team to complete the treble in the 1912–1913 season, beating Warrington Wolves 9–5 in the Challenge Cup final. They then went on to finish top of the league and win the Championship Final 29–2 beating Wigan.

==== 1914–15 ====
Huddersfield won their second treble before going on to win All Four Cups in 1914–15, beating St. Helens 37–3 in the Challenge Cup final and then beating Leeds 35–2 in the Championship Final a few weeks after they finished top of the league.

=== Leeds Rhinos ===
==== 2015 ====
Leeds won their only treble in 2015. They began by whitewashing Hull Kingston Rovers 50–0 in the biggest ever win in the Challenge Cup Final to claim back to back Cup wins for only the second time. They won the League Leader's Shield after beating Huddersfield Giants in the final match of Super League XX, with winger Ryan Hall scoring in the last second to win the match. They completed the treble after beating Wigan Warriors for the first time in a major final, winning 22–20 in the 2015 Super League Grand Final.

=== St Helens ===
==== 1965–66 ====
St Helens won their first treble in 1966, beating Wigan 21–2 in the Challenge Cup, finishing top of the league and beating Halifax 35–12 in the Championship Final.

==== 2006 ====
In 2006 Saints become only the second team in the Super League era to win the treble, 40 years after winning their first. They beat Huddersfield 42–12 in the 2006 Challenge Cup final, went on to finish top of Super League and beat Hull FC, who were playing in their first Grand Final, 26–4 in the 2006 Super League Grand Final. The 2006 St Helens team became only the second rugby league team in history to win the BBC Sports Personality Team of the Year Award.

=== Swinton Lions ===
==== 1927–28 ====
Swinton Lions won their only treble in 1927–28 before going on to win All Four Cups. They started by beating Warrington 5–3 in the Challenge Cup and beat Featherstone Rovers 11–0 in the Championship Final after they finished top of the league.

=== Wigan Warriors ===
==== 1991–92 ====
Wigan Warriors won their first treble in the 1991–92 season, finishing top of the league, defeating Castleford 28–12 in the Challenge Cup final and beating St Helens 48–16 in the Premiership final.

==== 1993–94 ====
Wigan won their second treble in 1993–94, finishing top of the league, defeating Leeds 26–12 in the Challenge Cup final and beating Castleford 24–20 in the Premiership final.

==== 1994–95 ====
Wigan won the treble for a third time in the 1994–95 season, finishing top of the league, beating Leeds 30–10 in the Challenge Cup final and beating Leeds 69–12 in the Premiership final.

==== 2024 ====
Wigan won the treble for a record fourth time in the 2024 season, finishing top of the league, beating Warrington 18–8 in the Challenge Cup final and beating Hull KR 9–2 in the Super League Grand Final. This was Wigan's first treble in the Super League era.

=== Hull KR ===
==== 2025 ====
Hull KR won their first treble in 2025, finishing top of the league, defeating Warrington Wolves 8–6 in the 2025 Challenge Cup final, and beating Wigan Warriors 24–6 in the 2025 Super League Grand Final.

=== Winners by club ===
	Club	Wins	Winning years
1	Wigan Warriors	4	1991–92, 1993–94, 1994–95, 2024
2	Huddersfield Giants	2	1912–13, 1914–15
2	St. Helens	2	1965–66, 2006
4	Swinton Lions	1	1927–28
4	Bradford Bulls	1	2003
4	Leeds Rhinos	1	2015
4	Hull Kingston Rovers	1	2025

== Women's Treble ==
=== Featherstone Rovers ===
Fetherstone Rovers were the first women's team in British rugby league to achieve the treble in 2012 when they won the inaugural Challenge Cup, finished top of the Women's Premier Division and won the Championship final.

=== Thatto Heath Crusaders / St Helens ===
Thatto Heath Crusaders achieved the treble twice when they won all three trophies in 2013 and 2016. The team then won again under the new St Helens name in 2021.

=== Bradford Bulls ===
In 2017, Bradford Bulls became the third team to complete the women's treble.

=== Wigan Warriors ===
Wigan Warriors completed the treble in 2025, doing so as an amateur side with three semi-professional teams in the league.

=== Winners by club ===
	Club	Wins	Winning years
1	Thatto Heath Crusaders / St Helens	3	2013, 2016, 2021
2	Featherstone Rovers	1	2012
2	Bradford Bulls	1	2017
2	Wigan Warriors	1	2025

== Wheelchair Treble ==
=== Leeds Rhinos ===
Leeds Rhinos won the wheelchair treble in 2021, winning the Challenge Cup and both trophies in the 2021 RFL Wheelchair Super League.

=== Halifax Panthers ===
Halifax Panthers won the wheelchair treble in 2025 after winning the 2025 Wheelchair Challenge Cup and both League Leaders' Shield and Grand Final of the 2025 RFL Wheelchair Super League. They did so, going the entire season undefeated. They won the treble again in the 2026 season.

Club	No.	Years
Halifax Panthers	2	2025, 2026
Leeds Rhinos	1	2021

== In France ==
Similar to the UK, the treble in French rugby league is achieved by winning the primary league competition, the Elite One Championship (French Rugby League Championship before 2002), the primary cup competition, the Lord Derby Cup, in addition to being the league leader at the end of the regular season. The teams that have achieved this are as follows:

NB: Treble information prior to 2002, the start of the Elite One Championship era, is unavailable.

=== Winners by club ===
	Club	Wins	Winning years
1	Pia	2	2005–06, 2006–07
1	Lézignan	2	2009–10, 2010–11
3	Union Treiziste Catalane	1	2004–05
3	Toulouse	1	2013–14
3	AS Carcassonne	1	2023–24

== Australia and the World Club Challenge ==
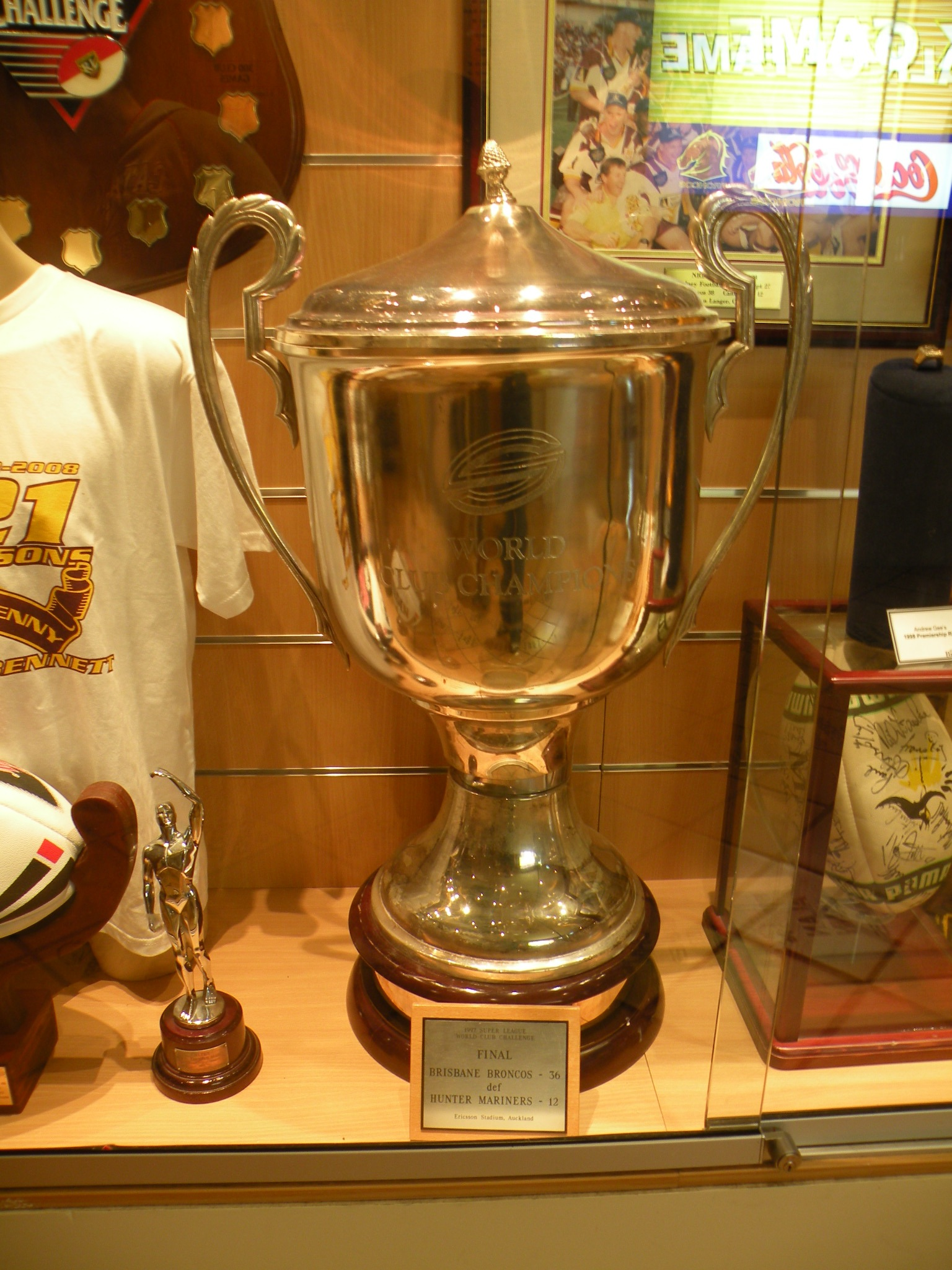
The World Club Challenge is won in the first match of the following season, to complete a quadruple in the UK or the treble in Australia

In the UK, Winning the World Club Challenge alongside the treble is often referred to as The Grand Slam or The Quadruple. The competition has been played since 1976, and the competition is played as the opener to the following season. In Australia, due to the lack of a primary cup competition, Australian teams (and those from other countries associated with the Australian league) are unable to win the treble, with the only major trophies traditionally available being that of the NRL Grand Final and Minor Premiership (equivalent of the League Leaders' Shield).

- For a list of clubs to win this competition whist winning their respective Grand Final and League Leaders' Shield see here.
- For a list of British clubs to win this competition whist also winning the treble see the list below:

=== Wigan Warriors ===
==== 1993–94 ====
Wigan Warriors are the only team to achieve a quadruple of trophies in the same year, during the 1993–94 season. After winning the league, Wigan defeated Leeds 26–16 at Wembley to win the Challenge Cup, then beat Castleford Tigers 24–20 at Old Trafford to win the Premiership Trophy and complete the Treble. Following their Treble victory they beat Brisbane Broncos 20–14 in the World Club Challenge who were the 1993 NSWRL Champions.

==== 2024 ====
Wigan became the first team to win the Quadruple over the same calendar year as they won the 2024 World Club Challenge in a 16–12 win over Penrith Panthers, the 2024 Challenge Cup final in an 18–8 win over Warrington Wolves, the 2024 League Leaders' Shield, and winning the 2024 Super League Grand Final 9–2 against Hull Kingston Rovers.

=== Bradford Bulls ===
Bradford Bulls became the second team to hold four trophies, though this was over two different seasons, and the first of the Super League era, winning the treble in 2003 before completing the quadruple by beating Penrith Panthers 22–4 in the following year's World Club Challenge. Given the current winners of the NRL and Super League take part in this game it is considered as part of the quadruple.

=== St Helens ===
Following their treble victory in the 2006 season, they beat Brisbane Broncos 18–14 in the World Club Challenge. Following the 2023 Super League season, St Helens defeated Penrith Panthers 13–12 in golden point, after Penrith scored a last gasp try to level the game. Lewis Dodd won the game for St Helens with a drop goal in the 83rd minute.

=== Hull Kingston Rovers ===
Hull KR won the 2026 World Club Challenge defeating Brisbane Broncos 30–24 to complete the Quadruple following their 8–6 win in 2025 Challenge Cup final in over Warrington Wolves, the 2025 League Leaders' Shield, and winning the 2025 Super League Grand Final 24–6 against Wigan Warriors.

=== Winners by club ===
	Club	Wins	Winning years
1	Wigan Warriors	2 (Note: Wigan have a widely misreported quadruple in 1994–95, with the club winning the treble in addition to the 1994–95 Regal Trophy. Note: No World Club Challenge was held in 1995 as it did not become a regular competition until 2000.)	1993–94, 2024 (Note: This is the first widely reported quadruple to include the calendar year's World Club Challenge and not the following season's. Note: The 2025 World Club Challenge was abandoned by Penrith Panthers, although no title was awarded for 2025, Wigan, without challenge, retained their title for a second year.)
2	Bradford Bulls	1	2003
2	St. Helens	1	2006
2	Hull Kingston Rovers	1	2026

== See also ==
- Double (rugby league)
- All Four Cups
