= 2024 RFL Wheelchair Super League =

2024 wheelchair rugby league competition in the United Kingdom

- League: Wheelchair Super League
- Duration: 16 June – 13 October 2024
- Teams: 5
- Matches played: 23

2024
- Champions: Leeds Rhinos
- League Leaders: Leeds Rhinos

The 2024 Wheelchair Super League (also known as the 2024 Betfred Wheelchair Super League for sponsorship purposes) was the fifth season of the Rugby Football League (RFL) premier wheelchair rugby league competition.

The defending champions were Wigan Warriors who won the 2023 Grand Final, defeating Leeds Rhinos 50–42.

Five teams form the league and each played eight fixtures during the regular season, playing each of the other teams twice - home and away. At the end of the regular season, the top four teams advanced to the play-offs which were knock-out semi-finals followed by the grand final.

Unlike 2023, there were not any magic rounds with matches played at neutral venues. The teams had more home fixtures with the aim of increasing local support.

The grand final was broadcast live on Sky Sports.

On 13 October, Leeds Rhinos defeated Halifax Panthers 52–32 in the Grand Final to become the 2024 champions.

== Teams ==
Locations of the 2024 Wheelchair Super League teams in England

Team	2023 position	Stadium
Halifax Panthers	4th	Calderdale College, Halifax
Hull F.C.	5th	Hull FC Centre of Excellence, Hull
Leeds Rhinos	1st	Leeds Beckett University sports arena, Leeds
London Roosters	2nd	Medway Park, Gillingham
Wigan Warriors	3rd	Robin Park Arena, Wigan

== Results ==
The regular season commenced on 16 June with 10 rounds of matches played until 22 September. The semi-finals were played on 27–28 September with the Grand Final played on 13 October.

All times are British Summer Time (UTC+01:00)

Source:RFL Match Centre

=== Regular season ===
Betfred Wheelchair Super League: round one
Home	Score	Away	Match Information	
Home	Score	Away	Date	Venue
Halifax Panthers	52–64	Leeds Rhinos	16 June, 14:00	Sedbergh Leisure Centre (Low Moor)
Hull F.C.	16–54	Wigan Warriors	16 June, 17:00	Hull FC Centre of Excellence
Bye: London Roosters

Betfred Wheelchair Super League: round two
Home	Score	Away	Match Information	
Home	Score	Away	Date	Venue
Leeds Rhinos	62–24	Hull F.C.	22 June, 14:00	Leeds Beckett University
London Roosters	20–14	Wigan Warriors	23 June, 14:00	Medway Park
Bye: Halifax Panthers

Betfred Wheelchair Super League: round three
Home	Score	Away	Match Information	
Home	Score	Away	Date	Venue
Wigan Warriors	36–42	Leeds Rhinos	29 June, 15:00	Robin Park Arena
London Roosters	52–72	Halifax Panthers	30 June, 14:00	Medway Park
Bye: Hull F.C.

Betfred Wheelchair Super League: round four
Home	Score	Away	Match Information	
Home	Score	Away	Date	Venue
Leeds Rhinos	44–40	London Roosters	13 July, 14:00	Leeds Beckett University
Halifax Panthers	38–38	Hull F.C.	14 July, 14:00	Calderdale College
Bye: Wigan Warriors

Betfred Wheelchair Super League: round five
Home	Score	Away	Match Information	
Home	Score	Away	Date	Venue
Wigan Warriors	30–68	Halifax Panthers	20 July, 15:00	Robin Park Arena
Hull F.C.	42–44	London Roosters	21 July, 16:00	Hull FC Centre of Excellence
Bye: Leeds Rhinos

Betfred Wheelchair Super League: round six
Home	Score	Away	Match Information	
Home	Score	Away	Date	Venue
Wigan Warriors	48–34	London Roosters	27 July, 15:00	Robin Park Arena
Hull F.C.	32–44	Leeds Rhinos	28 July, 16:00	Hull FC Centre of Excellence
Bye: Halifax Panthers

Betfred Wheelchair Super League: round seven
Home	Score	Away	Match Information	
Home	Score	Away	Date	Venue
Leeds Rhinos	56–54	Halifax Panthers	10 August, 14:00	Leeds Beckett University
Wigan Warriors	16–48	Hull F.C.	17 August, 15:00	Robin Park Arena
Bye: London Roosters

Betfred Wheelchair Super League: round eight
Home	Score	Away	Match Information	
Home	Score	Away	Date	Venue
Halifax Panthers	46–40	London Roosters	18 August, 14:30	Calderdale College
Leeds Rhinos	46–36	Wigan Warriors	21 September, 14:00	Leeds Beckett University
Bye: Hull F.C.

Betfred Wheelchair Super League: round nine
Home	Score	Away	Match Information	
Home	Score	Away	Date	Venue
London Roosters	26–40	Leeds Rhinos	1 September, 14:00	Medway Park
Hull F.C.	20–56	Halifax Panthers	8 September, 14:15	Hull FC Centre of Excellence
Bye: Wigan Warriors

Betfred Wheelchair Super League: round ten
Home	Score	Away	Match Information	
Home	Score	Away	Date	Venue
London Roosters	68–10	Hull F.C.	14 September, 14:00	Hull FC Centre of Excellence
Halifax Panthers	42–46	Wigan Warriors	22 September, 15:20	Sedbergh Leisure Centre
Bye: Leeds Rhinos

==== Regular season table ====
Pos	Team	Pld	W	D	L	PF	PA	PD	Pts	Qualification
1	Leeds Rhinos	8	8	0	0	398	300	+98	16	Advance to semi-finals
2	Halifax Panthers	8	4	1	3	428	346	+82	9	Advance to semi-finals
3	London Roosters	8	3	0	5	324	316	+8	6	Advance to semi-finals
4	Wigan Warriors	8	3	0	5	280	316	−36	6	Advance to semi-finals
5	Hull F.C.	8	1	1	6	230	382	−152	3	

Source: BBC RFL

=== Play-offs ===
==== Semi-finals ====
Betfred Wheelchair Super League: semi-finals
Home	Score	Away	Match Information	
Home	Score	Away	Date	Venue
Halifax Panthers	56–38	London Roosters	28 September, 15:30	Allam Sports Centre
Leeds Rhinos	56–36	Wigan Warriors	28 September, 18:30	The Edge

==== Grand Final ====
Betfred Wheelchair Super League: Grand Final
Home	Score	Away	Match Information	
Home	Score	Away	Date	Venue
Halifax Panthers	32–52	Leeds Rhinos	13 October, 17:30	Allam Sports Centre
