= Wheelchair rugby league Ashes =

International wheelchair rugby league series between Australia and England

The Ashes
Tournament information
- Sport: Wheelchair rugby league
- Established: 2019
- Participants: Australia; England

The Wheelchair rugby league Ashes, similar to the cricket series and rugby league series of the same name, is a series of senior international matches between Australia and England national wheelchair rugby league football teams.

The inaugural tournament took place in 2019 when the England team toured Australia for the first time.

== History ==
=== Origins ===
Wheelchair rugby league was established in France in 2000 and was introduced to Australia in 2004 when a French team travelled to Sydney, and then to Great Britain in 2005 with a similar tour to Yorkshire. On 4 May 2006, wheelchair rugby league was given official recognition by the Rugby League International Federation; following this a team representing Great Britain began a tour of France which included the first official wheelchair rugby league test match on 3 June 2006. In 2007, following the All Golds tour, the Great Britain team was abolished in favour separate home nations teams compete in all future competitions, which saw an England team take part in the inaugural Wheelchair Rugby League World Cup, which was played as part of the 2008 Festival of World Cups. The 2008 World Cup, saw the first test match between England and Australia on 7 November 2008 with England winning the match 34–26. The pair later met in the final of the competition, and again in the 2013 and 2017 tournament, before the inaugural Wheelchair Rugby League Ashes was contested in 2019.

=== The Ashes ===
In June 2019, the RFL announced provisional plans for the England wheelchair team to tour Australia in October 2019. Initially the five-match tour was to include a three-game Ashes series and games against Queensland and New South Wales, but by September it had been revised to a two-match series with a match against North Queensland added to the schedule. England were undefeated on the tour and won the Ashes series 2–0. A Wheelaroo Tour (Note: The wheelchair rugby league equivalent of a Kangaroo Tour) of England in October 2020 was planned. This was later switched to an England tour of Australia, but ultimately did not take place.

In December 2024, an England wheelchair tour of Australia was announced for October 2025, with the schedule of the four-match tour (including the two-match Ashes series) being confirmed in May 2025. The tour dates coincided with the 2025 Kangaroo tour of England which included a men's Ashes series. (Note: Although the men's tour was originally scheduled to take place in Australia, the tour was moved to England before the wheelchair tour was announced.)

== Results ==
Year	Winner	Result	Runners-up	Host country	Ref
2019	England	2–0	Australia	Australia	
2025	England	2–0	Australia	Australia	

== See also ==
- Men's rugby league Ashes
- Women's rugby league Ashes
