= 2022 RFL Wheelchair Super League =

2022 wheelchair rugby league competition in the United Kingdom

- League: Wheelchair Super League
- Duration: ???? – 1 October 2022
- Teams: 7
- Matches played: ?

2022
- Champions: Halifax Panthers
- League Leaders: Leeds Rhinos

The 2022 Wheelchair Super League (also known as the 2022 Betfred Wheelchair Super League for sponsorship purposes) was the fourth season of the Rugby Football League (RFL) premier wheelchair rugby league competition.

The defending champions were Leeds Rhinos who won the 2022 Grand Final, defeating Leyland Warriors 52–36.

For the 2022 season, Warrington Wolves were promoted from the championship whilst London Roosters were a newly formed team, mainly with players taken from the Argonauts, Gravesend Dynamite and Medway Dragons clubs. Wigan Warriors were also granted a Super League position in their first season.

== Teams ==
Locations of the 2022 Wheelchair Super League teams in England

Team	2021 position	Stadium
Halifax Panthers	3rd	Calderdale College, Halifax
Hull F.C.	6th	Hull FC Centre of Excellence, Hull
Leeds Rhinos	1st	Leeds Beckett University sports arena, Leeds
London Roosters	2nd and 4th	Medway Park, Gillingham
North Wales Crusaders	5th	Wrexham
Warrington Wolves	2nd (Championship)	Warrington
Wigan Warriors	Inaugural Season	Robin Park Arena, Wigan

== Regular season ==
=== Phase 1 ===
POS	CLUB	P	W	L	D	PF	PA	DIFF	PTS	QUALIFICATION
1	Halifax Panthers	6	5	1	0	416	268	148	10	Advance to Phase 2
2	Wigan Warriors	6	4	1	1	522	274	248	9	Advance to Phase 2
3	Leeds Rhinos	6	4	1	1	432	228	204	9	Advance to Phase 2
4	London Roosters	6	4	2	0	296	258	38	8	Advance to Phase 2
5	North Wales Crusaders	6	1	5	0	273	404	−131	2	Transfer to Middle 5
6	Hull FC	6	1	5	0	216	444	−228	2	Transfer to Middle 5
7	Warrington Wolves	6	1	5	0	207	486	−279	2	Transfer to Middle 5

=== Phase 2 ===
POS	CLUB	P	W	L	D	PF	PA	DIFF	PTS	QUALIFICATION
1	Leeds Rhinos (L)	6	5	1	0	384	271	113	10	Advance to semi-finals
2	Halifax Panthers (C)	5	3	2	0	259	218	41	6	Advance to semi-finals
3	Wigan Warriors	6	3	3	0	316	268	48	6	Advance to semi-finals
4	London Roosters	5	0	5	0	138	340	−202	0	Advance to semi-finals

== Playoffs ==
- Semi Finals

Halifax Panthers 66–28 Wigan Warriors
London Roosters 14–54 Leeds Rhinos

- Grand Final

Leeds Rhinos 48–52 Halifax Panthers
(1 October 2022; 3:30pm; Belle Vue Sports Village, Manchester; Sky Sports Arena)

== Middle 5 ==
At the end of Phase 1, the bottom three sides of the Super League entered a 'Middle 5' division with the top sides in the championship.

POS	CLUB	P	W	L	D	PF	PA	DIFF	PTS	QUALIFICATION
1	North Wales Crusaders	5	5	0	0	362	1115	247	10	Relegated to 2023 Championship
2	Hull F.C.	5	4	1	0	222	203	19	10	Qualified for 2023 Super League
3	Hereford Harriers	5	2	3	0	127	126	1	4	Relegated to 2023 Championship
4	Warrington Wolves	5	1	4	0	68	230	−162	2	Qualified for 2023 Super League
5	Mersey Storm	4	0	4	0	83	188	−105	0	Relegated to 2023 Championship

Final

- North Wales Crusaders 102–46 Hull F.C.
