= 2025 RFL Wheelchair Super League =

2025 wheelchair rugby league competition in the United Kingdom

- League: Wheelchair Super League
- Duration: 21 June – 28 September 2024
- Teams: 7

2025
- Champions: Halifax Panthers
- League Leaders: Halifax Panthers

The 2025 Wheelchair Super League (also known as the 2025 Betfred Wheelchair Super League for sponsorship purposes) was the sixth season of the Rugby Football League (RFL) premier wheelchair rugby league competition.

The defending champions were Leeds Rhinos who won the 2024 Grand Final, defeating Halifax Panthers 52–32.

In December 2024, the RFL announced that the 2025 Super League season would have seven teams following successful applications of Edinburgh Giants and Sheffield Eagles to join the competition. Teams played six fixtures during the regular season, playing each of the other teams once. At the end of the regular season, the top four teams advanced to the play-offs which are a single round robin like the regular season. The top two advance to the Grand Final. On 16 August 2025, Leeds failed to fulfil their round seven match against Halifax and were ruled ineligible to compete in the play-offs.

The Grand Final took place at the Manchester Basketball Centre on Sunday, 28 September, and was broadcast live on Sky Sports. Halifax Panthers, who had won the Challenge Cup and finished top of the table, completed the treble with a 42–32 win over London Roosters.

== Teams ==
Locations of the 2025 Wheelchair Super League teams in England

Team	2024 position	Stadium
Edinburgh Giants	–	University of Edinburgh, Edinburgh
Halifax Panthers	4th	Calderdale College, Halifax
Hull F.C.	5th	Hull FC Centre of Excellence, Hull
Leeds Rhinos	1st	Leeds Beckett University sports arena, Leeds
London Roosters	2nd	Barking Sporthouse and Gym, Dagenham
Sheffield Eagles	Champ.	Olympic Legacy Park, Sheffield
Wigan Warriors	3rd	Robin Park Arena, Wigan

== Results ==
The regular season commenced on 21 June. The seven rounds of matches ran until 17 August.

All times are British Summer Time (UTC+01:00)

Source:RFL Match Centre

=== Regular season ===
Betfred Wheelchair Super League: round one
Home	Score	Away	Match Information	
Home	Score	Away	Date	Venue
London Roosters	40–40	Halifax Panthers	21 June, 14:00	Barking Sporthouse and Gym
Edinburgh Giants	6–114	Leeds Rhinos	21 June, 14:00	The University of Edinburgh
Wigan Warriors	80–4	Sheffield Eagles	21 June, 15:00	Hull FC Centre of Excellence
Bye: Hull F.C.				Match reports:

Betfred Wheelchair Super League: round two
Home	Score	Away	Match Information	
Home	Score	Away	Date	Venue
Sheffield Eagles	10–86	London Roosters	5 July, 12:45	English Institute of Sport
Edinburgh Giants	18–76	Wigan Warriors	5 July, 14:30	The University of Edinburgh
Halifax Panthers	104–10	Hull F.C.	5 July, 14:30	Sedbergh Sports Centre
Bye: Leeds Rhinos				Match reports:

Betfred Wheelchair Super League: round three
Home	Score	Away	Match Information	
Home	Score	Away	Date	Venue
Edinburgh Giants	4–79	Halifax Panthers	12 July, 14:30	The University of Edinburgh
Hull F.C.	36–32	Sheffield Eagles	12 July, 14:45	The Allam Sports Centre
Leeds Rhinos	58–16	Wigan Warriors	12 July, 14:45	The Edge
Bye: London Roosters				Match reports:

Betfred Wheelchair Super League: round four
Home	Score	Away	Match Information	
Home	Score	Away	Date	Venue
London Roosters	66–22	Edinburgh Giants	19 July, 12:30	Barking Sporthouse and Gym
Wigan Warriors	54–4	Hull F.C.	19 July, 15:00	Robin Park Arena
Sheffield Eagles	24–98	Leeds Rhinos	20 July, 13:30	Ponds Forge
Bye: Halifax Panthers				Match reports:

Betfred Wheelchair Super League: round five
Home	Score	Away	Match Information	
Home	Score	Away	Date	Venue
Hull F.C.	52–34	Edinburgh Giants	2 August, 14:30	The Allam Sports Centre
Leeds Rhinos	28–52	London Roosters	2 August, 14:45	York St John University Sports Park
Wigan Warriors	0–68	Halifax Panthers	2 August, 15:00	Robin Park Arena
Bye: Sheffield Eagles				Match reports:

Betfred Wheelchair Super League: round six
Home	Score	Away	Match Information	
Home	Score	Away	Date	Venue
Halifax Panthers	80–24	Sheffield Eagles	9 August, 12:00	Sedbergh Sports Centre
London Roosters	70–0	Wigan Warriors	9 August, 14:00	Barking Sporthouse and Gym
Leeds Rhinos	98–0	Hull F.C.	9 August, 14:45	The Edge
Bye: Edinburgh Giants				Match reports:

Betfred Wheelchair Super League: round seven
Home	Score	Away	Match Information	
Home	Score	Away	Date	Venue
Halifax Panthers	C–C	Leeds Rhinos	—N/a (Note: Forfeited by Leeds, awarded as a 24–0 win to Halifax)	
Sheffield Eagles	28–50	Edinburgh Giants	16 August, 14:45	English Institute of Sport
Hull F.C.	26–30	London Roosters	17 August, 15:00	The Allam Sports Centre
Bye: Wigan Warriors				Match reports:

==== Regular season table ====
Pos	Team	Pld	W	D	L	PF	PA	PD	Pts	Qualification
1	Halifax Panthers	6	5	1	0	395	78	+317	11	play-offs
2	London Roosters	6	5	1	0	344	126	+218	11	play-offs
3	Leeds Rhinos	6	4	0	2	396	122	+274	7 (Note: Leeds docked one competition point for forfeited match)	ineligible (Note: Leeds forfeited their regular season game against Halifax due to player availability. Per operational rule they were therefore ineligible for playoffs and their place was awarded to the fifth-placed team.)
4	Wigan Warriors	6	3	0	3	226	222	+4	6	play-offs
5	Hull F.C.	6	2	0	4	128	352	−224	4	play-offs
6	Edinburgh Giants	6	1	0	5	134	415	−281	2	
7	Sheffield Eagles	6	0	0	6	122	430	−308	0	

Source: BBCSuper League

=== Play-offs ===
Four teams qualified for the play-off group stage played between 30 August and 13 September, from which the top two team qualified for the Grand Final to be played on 28 September. Play-offs occurred at neutral venues and were played as triple headers - two play-off round robins and a friendly between two of the three teams who failed to qualify (the other receiving a bye). (Note: Before the play-offs began it was stated in Rugby Leaguer & League Express that points from the regular season would be carried over to the play-off stage, however, this appeared to be erroneous as after round two it was reported as still being possible for Wigan to qualify for the Grand Final)

==== Play-off group results ====
Betfred Wheelchair Super League: round eight / play-offs round one
Team 1	Score	Team 2	Match Information	
Team 1	Score	Team 2	Date	Venue
Sheffield Eagles	34–54	Edinburgh Giants	30 August, 12:00	National Basketball Performance Centre, Manchester
London Roosters	52–24	Wigan Warriors	30 August, 14:00	National Basketball Performance Centre, Manchester
Hull FC	0–134	Halifax Panthers	30 August, 16:00	National Basketball Performance Centre, Manchester
Bye: Leeds Rhinos				Match reports:

Betfred Wheelchair Super League: round nine / play-offs round two
Team 1	Score	Team 2	Match Information	
Team 1	Score	Team 2	Date	Venue
London Roosters	28–36	Halifax Panthers	6 September, 12:00	University of Nottingham
Hull FC	24–72	Wigan Warriors	6 September, 14:00	University of Nottingham
Sheffield Eagles	38–94	Leeds Rhinos	6 September, 16:00	University of Nottingham
Bye: Edinburgh Giants				Match reports:

Betfred Wheelchair Super League: round ten / play-offs round three
Team 1	Score	Team 2	Match Information	
Team 1	Score	Team 2	Date	Venue
Halifax Panthers	78–28	Wigan Warriors	13 September, 12:00	The Allam Sports Centre, Hull
London Roosters	86–20	Hull FC	13 September, 14:00	The Allam Sports Centre, Hull
Edinburgh Giants	10–80	Leeds Rhinos	13 September, 16:00	The Allam Sports Centre, Hull
Bye: Sheffield Eagles				Match reports:

==== Play-off table ====
Pos	Team	Pld	W	D	L	PF	PA	PD	Pts	Qualification
1	Halifax Panthers	3	3	0	0	248	56	+192	6	Grand Final
2	London Roosters	3	2	0	1	166	80	+86	4	Grand Final
3	Wigan Warriors	3	1	0	2	124	154	−30	2	
4	Hull F.C.	3	0	0	3	44	292	−248	0	

==== Grand Final ====
Betfred Wheelchair Super League: Grand Final
Team 1	Score	Team 2	Match Information	
Team 1	Score	Team 2	Date	Venue
Halifax Panthers	42–32	London Roosters	28 September	National Basketball Performance Centre, Manchester
Match reports:
