= London Roosters =

Wheelchair rugby league team

Club information
- Founded: 2022; 4 years ago

Current details
- Ground: Medway Park Sports Centre
- Competition: Super League
- 2026: 4th
- Current season

Records
- Championships: 0
- Challenge Cups: 0
- European Club Challenges: 0

London Roosters is an English wheelchair rugby league team based in Gillingham, Kent and competes in the RFL Wheelchair Super League. The club has played its home games at the Medway Park Sports Centre since its formation in 2022 following the merging of three clubs – Argonauts, Gravesend Dynamite and Medway Dragons clubs. (Note: The clubs also continued to operate separate teams in the lower divisions. As of 2025 Medway Dragons and Gravesend Dynamite compete in the Regional South.)

== History ==
In their first season, London Roosters finished as semi-finalists in the 2022 RFL Wheelchair Super League. The same result followed in 2023, and again in 2024. The 2025 season saw the club's first major final appearance is the 2025 Challenge Cup where they lost 24–46 to Halifax Panthers. This was followed three months later by another loss to Halifax in the Super League Grand Final.

== Seasons ==
Season	League										Challenge Cup	European Club Challenge
Season	Division	P	W	D	L	F	A	Pts	Pos	Play-offs	Challenge Cup	European Club Challenge
2022	Super League	6	4	2	0	296	258	8	4th	Lost in semi-final	RR	No competition
2023	Super League	10	8	2	0	566	306	16	2nd	Lost in semi-final	RR	Did not qualify
2024	Super League	8	3	0	5	324	316	6	3rd	Lost in semi-final	SF	Did not qualify
2025	Super League	6	5	1	0	344	126	11	2nd	—N/a	RU	No competition
2025	SL Play-offs	3	2	0	1	166	80	4	2nd	Lost in Grand Final	RU	No competition
2026	Super League	14	10	0	4	838	427	20	4th	Lost in semi-final	SF	No competition
