= Wheelchair State Challenge =

Annual Australian wheelchair rugby league competition

- Sport: Wheelchair rugby league
- Inaugural season: 2015
- Number of teams: 2
- Country: Australia (ARL)
- Shield Holders: New South Wales (2026)
- Website: NRL Wheelchair

The Wheelchair State Challenge is an annual wheelchair rugby league fixture between the Australian state representative sides of New South Wales and Queensland. First played in 2015 as the Wheelchair Interstate Challenge, the competition was rebranded as the Wheelchair State of Origin in 2019, and as the Wheelchair State Challenge in 2023.

== History ==
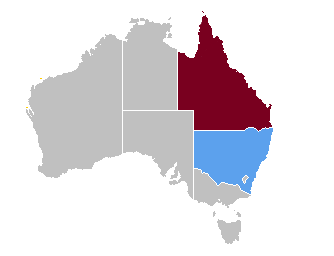
Map of Australia: Queensland (Maroon), New South Wales (Blue)

=== Establishment of wheelchair rugby league ===
Wheelchair rugby league was developed in France in 2000 and introduced to Australia by a touring French team in 2004. Interest in the sport increased when the first World Cup was held in Sydney in November 2008 and in December 2009 it was announced that a wheelchair rugby league competition would be launched in New South Wales. The sport continued to develop in the Sydney area and the Australian Wheelchair Rugby League had grown to eight teams by 2014 when exhibition matches and events were first held in Queensland as part of an effort to expand the game within Australia.

=== Wheelchair Interstate Challenge (2015–2018) ===
The inaugural interstate competition took place at the Eagles Sports Complex, Mansfield, on 2 July 2015 with New South Wales winning 49–4 in a one-off match. It was proposed that the competition could be expanded into a three-match series. In 2016, the challenge was played as a two-match series at the Sleeman Sports Complex in Brisbane on the weekend before Game II of the 2016 State of Origin series. New South Wales won 84–0 and 90–6 for a 2–0 series win. The same venue and format was used in June 2017 as New South Wales remained unbeaten to retain their title. In 2018, the challenge reverted to a single-match format and was won 54–18 by New South Wales. It was played at the Quaycentre, Sydney Olympic Park, on the same day as Game II of the 2018 State of Origin series at the nearby ANZ Stadium.

=== Wheelchair State of Origin (2019–2022) ===
In 2019, the match was played under the State of Origin name. On 6 July, New South Wales won 52–4 in front of an estimated crowd of 1,000 at the Quaycentre. The competition was cancelled in 2020 due to the COVID-19 pandemic, and the June 2021 fixture was postponed until January 2022 when it was played without spectators at the Whitlam Centre, Liverpool. Queensland claimed the title for the first time with a 50–30 win. In July 2022, Queensland retained the title with a 49–24 win at the Townsville Stadium.

=== Wheelchair State Challenge (2023–present) ===
The competition was rebranded as the Wheelchair State Challenge in 2023. The 2023 match was scheduled to take place at the Quaycentre but this was changed in June when the venue became unavailable. On 8 July, Queensland won their third successive title with a 42–26 victory at the Whitlam Leisure Centre. The 2024 competition took place on 13 July at the South Pine Sports Centre, City of Moreton Bay. Queensland won 42–36 to retain the title. The 2025 match, which was played on 13 July at the Whitlam Leisure Centre, saw Queensland take a 30–12 lead at half-time then resist a New South Wales fightback to win 48–36. The 2026 State Challenge took place on 6 September at Bennelong Sports Centre in West Ryde, New South Wales. The player of the match, Diab Karim, scored 34 points (four tries and nine goals) for New South Wales who won the match 54–40.

== Results ==
Year	Winner	Score	Location	Ref
2015	New South Wales	49–4	QLD	
2016	New South Wales	84–0	QLD	
2016	New South Wales	90–6	QLD	
2017	New South Wales	?	QLD	
2017	New South Wales	?	QLD	
2018	New South Wales	54–18	NSW	
2019	New South Wales	52–4	NSW	
2020	Cancelled			
2021	Queensland	50–30	NSW	
2022	Queensland	49–24	QLD	
2023	Queensland	42–26	NSW	
2024	Queensland	42–36	QLD	
2025	Queensland	48–36	NSW	
2026	New South Wales	54–40	NSW	
