= Sheffield Eagles Wheelchair =

Wheelchair rugby league club in Sheffield, England

Sheffield Eagles
Club information
- Full name: Sheffield Eagles Wheelchair Rugby League Football Club
- Nickname: The Eagles
- Colours: Red and Gold
- Founded: 2021; 5 years ago

Current details
- Competition: RFL Wheelchair Super League
- 2024: 1st (Championship East)

Uniforms
Home colours

The Sheffield Eagles Wheelchair Rugby League Football Club are an English wheelchair rugby league club based in Sheffield, South Yorkshire. The club competes in the RFL Wheelchair Super League, the top tier of the British rugby league system. The club was established in 2021.

== History ==
Sheffield Eagles formed their wheelchair team in 2021. After holding several trial sessions the club began training to field a side in the 2022 season. In 2022, Sheffield failed to win a single match, but by 2023 reached the final of the Challenge Trophy and finished the season in 3rd. In the 2024 season, Sheffield won the RFL Wheelchair Championship by defeating Gravesend Dynamite 38–36 in the Championship Grand Final. In December 2024, it was announced that the club had been accepted into the Super League for the 2025 season.

== Seasons ==
Season	League										Challenge Cup	Challenge Trophy
Season	Division	P	W	D	L	F	A	Pts	Pos	Play-offs	Challenge Cup	Challenge Trophy
2022	Championship North	5	0	0	5	46	442	0	6th	—N/a	—N/a	Round Robin stage
2022	Phase 2	4	0	0	4	50	228	0	5th	—N/a	—N/a	Round Robin stage
2023	Championship	10	5	0	5	364	500	10	3rd	Lost in semi-final	—N/a	Runners-up
2024	Championship East	8	8	0	0	710	298	16	1st	Champions	—N/a	Lost in semi-final
2025	Super League	6	0	0	6	122	430	0	7th	—N/a	Lost in semi-final	—N/a
2026	Super League	14	4	0	10	524	948	8	6th			

== Honours ==
=== Leagues ===
- RFL Wheelchair Championship
  - Grand Final
    Winners (1): 2024
  - League Leaders' Shield
    Winners (1): 2024

=== Cups ===
- Wheelchair Challenge Trophy

Runners Up (1): 2023
