= 2023 RFL Wheelchair Super League =

2023 wheelchair rugby league competition in the United Kingdom

- League: Wheelchair Super League
- Duration: 15 April – 15 October 2023
- Teams: 6
- Matches played: 33

2023
- Champions: Wigan Warriors
- League Leaders: Leeds Rhinos

Promotion and relegation
- Relegated to Championship: Warrington Wolves

The 2023 Wheelchair Super League (also known as the 2023 Betfred Wheelchair Super League for sponsorship purposes) was the fourth season of the Rugby Football League (RFL) premier wheelchair rugby league competition.

The defending champions were Halifax Panthers who won the 2022 Grand Final, defeating Leeds Rhinos 52–48.

For the 2023 season, North Wales Crusaders were relegated to the Championship. A magic round was incorporated into the wheelchair game for the first time, occurring on 15 April at the University of Birmingham. Magic round was broadcast live on The Sportsman. Following the success of magic round, further magic rounds were implemented through the season.

The grand final was broadcast live on Sky Sports.

== Teams ==
Locations of the 2023 Wheelchair Super League teams in England

Team	2022 position	Stadium
Halifax Panthers	2nd	Calderdale College, Halifax
Hull F.C.	2nd (Middle 5)	Hull FC Centre of Excellence, Hull
Leeds Rhinos	1st	Leeds Beckett University sports arena, Leeds
London Roosters	4th	Medway Park, Gillingham
Warrington Wolves	4th (Middle 5)	Warrington
Wigan Warriors	3rd	Robin Park Arena, Wigan

== Regular season table ==
POS	CLUB	P	W	L	D	PF	PA	DIFF	PTS	QUALIFICATION
1	Leeds Rhinos (L)	10	8	2	0	710	298	412	16	Advance to semi-finals
2	London Roosters	10	8	2	0	566	306	260	16	Advance to semi-finals
3	Wigan Warriors (C)	10	5	5	0	605	361	244	10	Advance to semi-finals
4	Halifax Panthers	10	5	5	0	519	351	168	10	Advance to semi-finals
5	Hull FC	10	4	6	0	344	514	−170	8	
6	Warrington Wolves (R)	10	0	10	0	138	1052	−914	0	Relegated to Championship

== Playoffs ==
=== Semi Finals ===
- Leeds Rhinos 54–44 Halifax Panthers
- London Roosters 34–43 Wigan Warriors

=== Grand Final ===
15 October 2023
17:30 BST (UTC+01:00)

Leeds Rhinos	42–50	Wigan Warriors
Tries: Boyd-Ward (3), Collins (4), Halliwell, Mulhall; Goals: Collins (2), Halliwell	report	Tries: Heggie (3), Lane (2), Wooloff, Roberts (2), Rigby; Goals: Roberts (7)

National Basketball Centre, Manchester
