= RFL Wheelchair Championship =

Rugby league in United Kingdom

Wheelchair Championship
- Current season, competition or edition: 2026 RFL Wheelchair Championship
- Sport: Wheelchair rugby league
- Founded: 2020; 6 years ago
- First season: 2021
- No. of teams: 14
- Country: England; Scotland; Wales
- Most recent champion: Rochdale Hornets (2026)
- Most titles: North Wales Crusaders (2 titles)
- Level on pyramid: 2
- Promotion to: RFL Wheelchair Super League
- Domestic cup: Wheelchair Challenge Cup

The RFL Wheelchair Championship is the second highest level of wheelchair rugby league in England and Wales, with teams promoted to the RFL Wheelchair Super League providing certain criteria is met.

The Wheelchair Championship was founded in 2020, one year after the Super League, following attempts to better organise the higher levels of the sport.

== Format ==
Like the Super League, the league operates a round robin system to determine the Championship Leaders' Shield before a playoff series leading to a grand final.

== Results ==
The following is a summary of Wheelchair Championship seasons:

Key

Promoted to next season's Super League
Withdrew from Championship

=== 2020 season ===
The inaugural 2020 season ended up being cancelled due to the COVID-19 pandemic after one round of matches.

POS	CLUB	P	W	L	D	PF	PA	DIFF	PTS
1	Gravesend Dynamite	1	1	0	0	172	16	156	2
2	Celts	1	1	0	0	26	0	26	2
3	North Wales Crusaders A	0	0	0	0	0	0	0	0
4	West Wales Raiders	0	0	0	0	0	0	0	0
5	Ebbw Vale	1	0	1	0	0	26	-26	0
6	Argonauts	1	0	1	0	16	172	-156	0

=== 2021 season ===
POS	CLUB	P	W	L	D	PF	PA	DIFF	PTS
1	Hereford Harriers	9	9	0	0	603	46	557	18
2	Warrington Wolves (P)	9	9	0	0	374	39	335	18
3	West Wales Raiders	11	3	8	0	74	323	-249	6
4	North Wales Crusaders A	7	2	5	0	120	318	-198	4
5	Torfaen Tigers	10	2	8	0	96	367	-271	4
6	Celts	4	0	4	0	0	174	-174	0

Final

- Hereford Harriers 75–32 Warrington Wolves

=== 2022 season ===
Like the Super League, the 2022 season was split into two phases. In addition, the championship was also split into a North and South division, and thus featured more teams. The top team in each division at the time of the split entered a Middle 5 division with the bottom three sides in the Super League.

==== Championship North ====
Phase 1

POS	CLUB	P	W	L	D	PF	PA	DIFF	PTS
1	Mersey Storm (M5)	5	5	0	0	406	51	355	10
2	Bradford Bulls (P2)	5	4	1	0	330	117	213	8
3	Dundee Dragons (P2)	5	3	2	0	234	174	60	6
4	North Wales Crusaders A (P2)	5	2	3	0	172	242	-70	4
5	Rochdale Hornets (P2)	5	1	4	0	71	233	-162	2
6	Sheffield Eagles (P2)	5	0	5	0	46	442	-396	0

Phase 2

POS	CLUB	P	W	L	D	PF	PA	DIFF	PTS
1	Bradford Bulls	6	5	1	0	434	142	292	10
2	North Wales Crusaders A	6	5	1	0	246	150	96	10
3	Dundee Dragons	5	2	3	0	184	114	70	4
4	Rochdale Hornets	5	1	4	0	112	392	-280	2
5	Sheffield Eagles	4	0	4	0	50	228	-178	0

Final

- Bradford Bulls 68–22 North Wales Crusaders A

==== Championship South ====
Phase 1

POS	CLUB	P	W	L	D	PF	PA	DIFF	PTS
1	Hereford Harriers (M5)	4	3	1	0	230	97	133	6
2	Woodlands Warriors (P2)	4	3	1	0	134	113	21	6
3	West Wales Raiders	2	0	0	2	0	0	0	2
4	Gravesend Dynamite (P2)	2	1	1	0	69	73	-4	2
5	Argonauts (P2)	3	0	2	1	54	112	-58	1
6	Torfaen Tigers	3	0	2	1	16	108	-92	1

Phase 2

POS	CLUB	P	W	L	D	PF	PA	DIFF	PTS
1	Gravesend Dynamite	3	3	0	0	221	68	153	6
2	Argonauts	2	1	1	0	66	136	-70	2
3	Woodlands Warriors	3	0	3	0	86	169	-83	0

Final

- Gravesend Dynamite 58–23 Woodlands Warriors

==== Middle 5 (with Super League) ====
POS	CLUB	P	W	L	D	PF	PA	DIFF	PTS
1	North Wales Crusaders	5	5	0	0	362	1115	247	10
2	Hull F.C. (P)	5	4	1	0	222	203	19	10
3	Hereford Harriers	5	2	3	0	127	126	1	4
4	Warrington Wolves (P)	5	1	4	0	68	230	-162	2
5	Mersey Storm	4	0	4	0	83	188	-105	0

Final

- North Wales Crusaders 102–46 Hull F.C.

=== 2023 season ===
The 2023 season saw North Wales Crusaders join after being relegated from the Super League.

POS	CLUB	P	W	L	D	PF	PA	DIFF	PTS
1	North Wales Crusaders	10	10	0	0	766	138	628	20
2	Wigan Warriors A	10	8	2	0	516	350	166	16
3	Sheffield Eagles	10	5	5	0	364	500	-136	10
4	Bradford Bulls	10	5	5	0	328	476	-148	10
5	Rochdale Hornets	10	2	8	0	256	532	-276	4
6	Mersey Storm	10	0	10	0	24	258	-234	-9

Final

- North Wales Crusaders 46–40 Wigan Warriors A

=== 2024 season ===
The 2024 season saw the Championship split into 3 regions. Sheffield Eagles, who won the Grand Final, were accepted into the Super League for the 2025 season.

==== Championship East ====
POS	CLUB	P	W	L	D	PF	PA	DIFF	PTS
1	Sheffield Eagles (P)	8	8	0	0	756	88	465	16
2	York Knights	10	6	2	0	398	162	236	12
3	Bradford Bulls	10	4	4	0	170	276	-106	8
4	Hull KR	10	2	6	0	231	468	-237	4
5	Wakefield Trinity	10	0	8	0	108	466	-358	0

==== Championship West ====
POS	CLUB	P	W	L	D	PF	PA	DIFF	PTS
1	Hereford Harriers	8	7	1	0	514	174	340	13
2	North Wales Crusaders	8	6	2	0	488	251	237	12
3	Warrington Wolves	8	4	4	0	430	348	82	8
4	Rochdale Hornets	8	2	6	0	275	527	-252	4
5	Widnes Vikings	8	1	7	0	200	607	-407	1

==== Championship South ====
POS	CLUB	P	W	L	D	PF	PA	DIFF	PTS
1	Gravesend Dynamite	6	6	0	0	514	92	422	12
2	Woodlands Warriors	6	4	2	0	214	204	10	8
3	Brentwood Eels	6	2	4	0	158	344	-186	4
4	Bedford Tigers	6	0	6	0	140	386	-246	0

==== Playoffs ====
East v West Qualification match

21 September 2024

North Wales Crusaders	126–0	York Knights

Playoff Semi Final

28 September 2024
11:45

Sheffield Eagles	48–38	North Wales Crusaders
Tries: Ben Simpson (13), Stephen Reilly (18, 46, 51, 63), Joe Wink-Simmonds (27, 55), Will Brooks (47), Chris Haynes (61); Goals: Joe Wink-Simmonds (5/6), Ben Simpson (1/2), Will Brooks (0/1)		Tries: Jonathan Gill (4, 44), Matthew Turner (33, 42, 78), Stuart Williams (37), Harry Jones (58), Martin Turner (67); Goals: Martin Turner (2/5), Harry Jones (1/3)

English Institute of Sport, Sheffield
Attendance: 63

Playoff Semi Final

28 September 2024
12:30

Hereford Harriers	16–40	Gravesend Dynamite

Championship Grand Final

13 October 2024
14:30

Sheffield Eagles	38–36 AET	Gravesend Dynamite
Tries: Will Brooks (2, 32, 60, 67), Stephen Reilly (28, 63), Joe-Wink-Simmonds (74); Goals: Joe-Wink-Simmonds (5/7), Ben Simpson (0/1)	1st: 16–12; 2nd: 36–36	Tries: Dan Grant (13, 76), Max Owen (20, 46), Reuben Bunning (43, 69); Goals: Dan Grant (6/6); Drop goals: Dan Grant (0/1)

Allam Arena, Hull
Player of the Match: Stephen Reilly

=== 2025 season ===
In the 2025 Championship Final, Castleford Tigers won 58–46 against Rochdale Hornets. Before the start of the season it was announced that Warrington Wolves would be promoted to the Super League for the 2026 season. However, after the 2025 season Warrington withdrew their application and following a new application process Bradford Bulls were invited to become the eighth Super League team for 2026.

Teams for 2025 season:

- Championship East
  Batley Bulldogs
  Bradford Bulls
  Castleford Tigers
  Hull KR
  Wakefield Trinity
  York Knights
- Championship West
  Hereford Harriers
  North Wales Crusaders
  Rochdale Hornets
  Salford Red Devils
  Warrington Wolves
  Widnes Vikings

=== 2026 season ===
The Championship was restructured into a single eight-team competition for the 2026 season. Rochdale Hornets defeated North Wales Crusaders 42–22 in the Grand Final.

Teams for 2026 Championship season:

Batley Bulldogs
Castleford Tigers
Gravesend Dynamite
Midlands Hurricanes (Note: Midlands Hurricanes took the place of Hereford Harriers in the 2026 Championship following the establishment of a partnership between the two clubs in November 2025)
North Wales Crusaders
Rochdale Hornets
Wakefield Trinity
York Knights

== Titles ==
Season	Champions	Score	Runners-up	League Leaders' Shield
2020	Tournament abandoned due to the COVID-19 pandemic
2021	Hereford Harriers	75–32	Warrington Wolves	Hereford Harriers
2022	North Wales Crusaders	102–46	Hull FC	North Wales Crusaders
2023	North Wales Crusaders	46–40	Wigan Warriors	North Wales Crusaders
2024	Sheffield Eagles	38–36	Gravesend Dynamite	Sheffield Eagles, Hereford Harriers, Gravesend Dynamite
2025	Castleford Tigers	58–46	Rochdale Hornets
2026	Rochdale Hornets	42–22	North Wales Crusaders	Rochdale Hornets

=== Grand Finals ===
Team	Winners	Runners-up
North Wales Crusaders	2 (2022, 2023)	1 (2026)
Rochdale Hornets	1 (2026)	1 (2025)
Castleford Tigers	1 (2025)	
Hereford Harriers	1 (2021)	
Sheffield Eagles	1 (2024)	
Gravesend Dynamite		1 (2024)
Hull		1 (2022)
Warrington Wolves		1 (2021)
Wigan Warriors 'A'		1 (2023)

=== Championship Leaders' Shield ===
Club	No.	Years
Hereford Harriers	2	2021, 2024
North Wales Crusaders	2	2022, 2023
Gravesend Dynamite	1	2024
Rochdale Hornets	1	2026
Sheffield Eagles	1	2024
