= RFL Wheelchair Super League =

Rugby league in United Kingdom

Wheelchair Super League
- Current season, competition or edition: 2026 RFL Wheelchair Super League
- Sport: Wheelchair rugby league
- Founded: 2019; 7 years ago
- No. of teams: 8
- Country: England; Scotland; Wales
- Most recent champion: Halifax Panthers (2026)
- Most titles: Halifax Panthers (4 titles)
- Level on pyramid: 1
- Relegation to: RFL Wheelchair Championship
- Domestic cup: Wheelchair Challenge Cup
- Website: Official website

The RFL Wheelchair Super League is the highest level of wheelchair rugby league in England, Scotland and Wales.

The Wheelchair Super League was founded in 2019, whilst the wheelchair competition was played in Great Britain prior to this, 2019 was the first official Super League season.

The league operates a promotion and relegation system with the second tier RFL Wheelchair Championship.

Starting in 2023, the previous year's league champions play the previous year's French Elite 1 champions in the European Club Challenge.

== Background ==
Plans were unveiled in 2011 for a Wheelchair Super League and Championship. The competition would feature Wigan, Halifax, Mersey Vikings, Bury Jigsaw and Wolverhampton Rhinos in the Super League, and Bradford Bulls, Mersey Vikings A, Wakefield, and Medway Dragons in the Championship. Small festival tournaments would also take place for clubs not yet ready to join the top divisions. The competition ran from April to September when the Grand Final was held. In 2012, the leagues were restructured with the Super League and Championship being replaced with a Premier League, Division One and Entry Division. The lower tiers were later renamed as the "Championship" and "Championship 1" and the top tier became the Super League at the start of the 2019 season.

== Format ==
Like the men's and women's running competition, the league operates a round robin system to determine the League Leaders' Shield before a playoff series leading to a grand final.

== Teams ==
The 2026 Super League teams are:

- Bradford Bulls (2026)
- Edinburgh Giants (2025–2026)
- Halifax Panthers (2019–2026)
- Hull FC (2020–2026)
- Leeds Rhinos (2019–2026)
- London Roosters (2022–2026) (Note: London Roosters were formed in 2022 from players from the Argonauts, Gravesend Dynamite and Medway Dragons and replaced the Argonauts in the Super League)
- Sheffield Eagles (2025–2026)
- Wigan Warriors (2022–2026) (Note: Leyland Warriors merged with Wigan Warriors who replaced them in the Super League)

Teams to have previously played in Super League are:

- Argonauts (2019–2021)
- Hereford Harriers (2019)
- Leyland Warriors (2020–2021)
- North Wales Crusaders (2019–2022)
- St Helens (2019)
- Warrington Wolves (2022–2023)

== Results ==
The following is a summary of Wheelchair Super League seasons:

Key

Qualified for playoffs

=== Pre Super League seasons ===
In the 2011 season, when the competition was also known as the "Super League", it was won by Bury Jigsaw who defeated Halifax in the Grand Final. In 2013, the National Championship was decided using a three team round-robin format in which Bury Jigsaw defeated Halifax and Mersey Storm to win the title. The same format was used for the finals day in 2014 when Leyland Warriors won the competition. Halifax won the Premier League title in 2015 and retained it in 2016 when they beat Leeds Rhinos 68 points to 54 in the Grand Final. Halifax won the title again in 2017, also by defeating Leeds in the final. The 2018 Grand Final saw Leeds Rhinos beat Halifax 54 points to 44.

=== 2019 season ===
The first Super League season saw six teams compete: Argonauts, Halifax, Hereford Harriers, Leeds Rhinos, North Wales Crusaders, and St Helens.

- Grand Final

Leeds Rhinos 42–50 Halifax
(19 September 2019; 19:00; Medway Park Sports Centre, Gillingham)

=== 2020 season ===
The 2020 season saw Leyland Warriors and Hull F.C. promoted to Super League, whilst Hereford Harriers and St Helens were relegated. The 2020 season was cancelled due to the COVID-19 pandemic.

POS	CLUB	P	W	L	D	PF	PA	DIFF	PTS
1	Leyland Warriors	1	1	0	0	112	28	84	2
2	Argonauts	1	1	0	0	60	26	34	2
3	Leeds Rhinos	1	1	0	0	60	32	28	2
4	Halifax	0	0	0	0	0	0	0	0
5	North Wales Crusaders	1	0	1	0	32	60	−28	0
6	Hull FC	2	0	2	0	54	172	−118	0

=== 2021 season ===
With the 2020 season being cancelled due to the pandemic, no new teams were included in the 2021 Super League.

POS	CLUB	P	W	L	D	PF	PA	DIFF	PTS
1	Leeds Rhinos (C)	9	9	0	0	622	206	416	18
2	Argonauts	5	4	1	0	224	110	114	8
3	Halifax Panthers	7	4	3	0	312	316	−4	8
4	Leyland Warriors	9	4	5	0	348	372	−24	8
5	North Wales Crusaders	5	0	5	0	103	322	−219	0
6	Hull FC	7	0	7	0	81	364	−283	0

Playoffs

- Semi Finals

Leeds Rhinos 66–63 Halifax Panthers
Leyland Warriors 76–38 Argonauts

- Grand Final

Leeds Rhinos 52–36 Leyland Warriors
(19 September 2021; 3:15pm; Medway Park Sports Centre, Gillingham; Sky Sports Arena)

=== 2022 onwards ===
2020s	2019−21	2022	2023	2024	2025	2026

== Titles ==
List of grand final winners, runners-up and league leaders by season
Season	Champions	Score	Runners-up	League Leaders
2019	Halifax	50–42	Leeds Rhinos	Leeds Rhinos
2020	Tournament abandoned due to the COVID-19 pandemic			
2021	Leeds Rhinos	52–36	Leyland Warriors	Leeds Rhinos
2022	Halifax Panthers	52–48	Leeds Rhinos	Leeds Rhinos
2023	Wigan Warriors	50–42	Leeds Rhinos	Leeds Rhinos
2024	Leeds Rhinos	52–32	Halifax Panthers	Leeds Rhinos
2025	Halifax Panthers	42–32	London Roosters	Halifax Panthers
2026	Halifax Panthers	64–24	Leeds Rhinos	Halifax Panthers

=== Champions ===
Club	No.	Years
Halifax Panthers	4	2019, 2022, 2025, 2026
Leeds Rhinos	2	2021, 2024
Wigan Warriors	1	2023

=== League Leaders' Shield ===
Club	No.	Years
Leeds Rhinos	5	2019, 2021, 2022, 2023, 2024
Halifax Panthers	2	2025, 2026

== Individual awards ==
The UK Wheelchair Rugby League Awards were first held in January 2020 and included Player of the Year, Young Player of the Year, Coach of the Year, Team of the Year, Club of the Year, Match Official of the Year, and the Chair's Award, and were based on performances in the Wheelchair Super League and the Challenge Cup. The sport then suffered a period of disruption due to COVID-19 and the next awards ceremony was not held until early 2023 (for the 2022 season). In 2023, three awards for the Wheelchair Super League were introduced as part of the Man of Steel Awards: the Coach of the Year, the Young Player of the Year, and the "Wheels of Steel" for the competition's outstanding player.

Year	Player of the Year "Wheels of Steel"		Young Player of the Year		Coach of the Year		Ref
Year	Name	Club	Name	Club	Name	Club	Ref
2019	Lewis King	Argonauts	Rob Hawkins	Halifax Panthers	Steve Jones	North Wales Crusaders	
2020	Awards not held						
2021	Awards not held						
2022	Rob Hawkins	Halifax Panthers	Nathan Collins	Leeds Rhinos	Phil Roberts	Wigan Warriors	
2023	Lewis King	London Roosters	Josh Butler	Leeds Rhinos	Tom Coyd	London Roosters	
2024	Josh Butler	Leeds Rhinos	Rob Hawkins	Halifax Panthers	Wayne Boardman	Halifax Panthers	
2025	Joe Coyd	London Roosters	Finlay O'Neill	Halifax Panthers	Tom Coyd	London Roosters	
2026	Rob Hawkins	Halifax Panthers	Max Owen	London Roosters	Martyn Gill	Edinburgh Giants	
