= Halifax Panthers Wheelchair =

Wheelchair rugby league club in Halifax, England

Halifax Panthers
Club information
- Full name: Halifax Wheelchair Rugby League Club
- Nickname(s): The Panthers; Fax
- Colours: Blue and White
- Founded: 2005; 21 years ago
- Website: halifaxwheelchairrugbyleague.org

Current details
- Competition: Super League
- 2026: 1st (Champions)
- Current season

Uniforms
Home colours	Away colours

Records
- Championships: 7 (2015, 2016, 2017, 2019, 2022, 2025, 2026)
- Challenge Cups: 6 (2015, 2016, 2017, 2018, 2025, 2026)
- European Club Challenges: 1 (2023)

The Halifax Panthers Wheelchair Rugby League Club are an English wheelchair rugby league club based in Halifax, West Yorkshire. The club competes in the RFL Wheelchair Super League, the top tier of the British rugby league system. The club was formed in 2005. It is connected to the Halifax Panthers rugby league club through its branding, but operates as a separate organisation.

== History ==
In July 2005, wheelchair rugby league was introduced to England by a French team who played against a team from Halifax. The team was known as Calderdale in 2008 when several players were selected for the England world cup squad, but became Halifax RLFC Wheelchair Tag Rugby League in 2009.

Halifax wheelchair team was one of the three founding members of the wheelchair rugby league competition in the United Kingdom along with Bury Jigsaw and Mersey Storm, with the former beating Halifax in the inaugural competition grand final. Bury would be the dominant force in the early days of the competition, winning the round robin format national championship in 2012 and 2013. 2015 saw Halifax's first silverware winning the league and cup double, which they would retain twice over winning the double again in 2016 and 2017. Halifax missed out of the league in 2018 but retained the cup for a fourth year running. Halifax won the first official Super League in 2019. Halifax's next league title came in 2022, qualifying them for the newly formed European Club Challenge in which they shared the inaugural title with French champions Catalans Dragons after a 32–32 draw.

In June 2025, Halifax won the Challenge Cup for the fifth time by defeating London Roosters 46–24 in the final. They continued their season success by winning both the League Leaders' Shield and Grand Final of the 2025 RFL Wheelchair Super League. They did so going the entire season undefeated, marking a record third Super League title. In July 2026, Halifax retained the Challenge Cup by defeating Leeds 92–24 in the final. They also finished top of the 2026 Super League and defeated Leeds 64–24 in the Grand Final to complete back-to-back trebles.

== Seasons ==
Season	League										Challenge Cup	European Club Challenge
Season	Division	P	W	D	L	F	A	Pts	Pos	Play-offs	Challenge Cup	European Club Challenge
2011	Super League	Unknown								2nd/3rd	No Competition	No Competition
2012	National Championship	Unknown								2nd/3rd	No Competition	No Competition
2013	National Championship	Unknown								2nd/3rd	No Competition	No Competition
2014	National Championship	Unknown								2nd/3rd/4th	No Competition	No Competition
2015	Premier League	Unknown								Champions	Champions	No Competition
2016	Premier League	Unknown							1st	Champions	Champions	No Competition
2017	Premier League	Unknown								Champions	Champions	No Competition
2018	Premier League	Unknown							1st	Runners-up	Champions	No Competition
2019	Super League	Unknown								Champions	Semi-finals	No Competition
2020	Super League	Season due to the COVID-19 pandemic										No Competition
2021	Super League	7	4	0	3	312	316	8	3rd	Lost in Semi-final	Third-place	No Competition
2022	Super League	6	5	0	1	416	268	10	1st	Champions	Fourth-place	No Competition
2022	SL: Phase 2	5	3	0	2	259	218	6	2nd	Champions	Fourth-place	No Competition
2023	Super League	10	5	0	5	519	351	10	4th	Lost in Semi-final	Fourth-place	Champions
2024	Super League	8	4	1	3	428	346	8	2nd	Runners-up	Quarter-finals	—N/a
2025	Super League	6	5	1	0	395	78	11	1st	Champions	Champions	—N/a
2025	SL: Play-offs	3	3	0	0	248	56	6	1st	Champions	Champions	—N/a
2026	Super League	14	13	0	1	1085	380	26	1st	Champions	Champions	—N/a

== Honours ==
=== Leagues ===
- Wheelchair Super League

Winners (7): 2015, 2016, 2017, 2019, 2022, 2025, 2026

=== Cups ===
- Wheelchair Challenge Cup

Winners (6): 2015, 2016, 2017, 2018, 2025, 2026

=== International ===
- European Club Challenge

Winners (1): 2023
