= Leeds Rhinos Wheelchair =

Wheelchair rugby league club in Leeds, England

Leeds Rhinos
Club information
- Full name: Leeds Rhinos Wheelchair Rugby League Football Club
- Nickname(s): The Rhinos; The Loiners
- Colours: Blue and Amber
- Founded: 2011; 15 years ago

Current details
- Chairman: Paul Caddick
- Competition: Super League
- 2026: 2nd
- Current season

Uniforms
Home colours

Records
- Championships: 3 (2018, 2021, 2024)
- Challenge Cups: 3 (2019, 2021, 2022)
- European Club Challenges: 0

The Leeds Rhinos Wheelchair Rugby League Football Club are an English wheelchair rugby league club based in Leeds, West Yorkshire. The club competes in the RFL Wheelchair Super League, the top tier of the British rugby league system. The club was established in 2011.

== History ==
Leeds Rhinos formed their wheelchair team in 2011. After holding several trial sessions the club began training to field two sides in the 2012 season. In 2015, Leeds reached the semi-finals of the inaugural Wheelchair Challenge Cup. They went back to back league and cup runners-up in 2016 and 2017. The following year in 2018 saw Leeds first silverware winning the Wheelchair Premier League, and a Challenge Cup victory and League Leaders' Shield one year later in 2019. In 2021, following the COVID-19 pandemic Leeds Rhinos won the treble; winning Grand Final, League Leaders' Shield, and Challenge Cup marking the first wheelchair treble in the Super League era. (Note: The competition was known as the Premier League in 2016 when Halifax finished top of the table and won the Grand Final in addition to winning the Challenge Cup) The Rhinos retained the Challenge Cup again in 2022. They also retained the League Leaders' Shield, but lost to Halifax in the Grand Final. In the 2023 season, Leeds topped the league again, but lost to Wigan in the Grand Final. In 2024, Leeds retained the League Leaders' Shield and then defeated Halifax in the Grand Final to claim their second Super League title.

== Seasons ==
Season	League										Challenge Cup	European Club Challenge
Season	Division	P	W	D	L	F	A	Pts	Pos	Play-offs	Challenge Cup	European Club Challenge
2016	Premier League	Unknown							2nd	Runners-up	Runners-up	No Competition
2017	Premier League	Unknown								Runners-up	Runners-up	No Competition
2018	Premier League	Unknown								Champions	Semi-finals	No Competition
2019	Super League	Unknown							1st	Runners-up	Champions	No Competition
2020	Super League	Season due to the COVID-19 pandemic										No Competition
2021	Super League	9	9	0	0	622	206	18	1st	Champions	Champions	No Competition
2022	Super League	12	9	1	2	816	499	19	1st	Runners-up	Champions	No Competition
2023	Super League	10	8	2	0	710	298	16	1st	Runners-up	Runners-up	Did not qualify
2024	Super League	8	8	0	0	398	300	16	1st	Champions	Semi-finals	Did not qualify
2025	Super League	6	4	0	2	396	122	7	2nd	Ineligible (Note: Leeds forfeited their regular season game against Halifax due to player availability. Per operational rule they were therefore ineligible for playoffs and their place was awarded to the fifth-placed team.)	Semi-finals	No Competition
2026	Super League	14	10	0	4	1050	494	20	2nd	Runners-up	Runners-up	No Competition

== Honours ==
=== Leagues ===
- Wheelchair Super League

Winners (3): 2018, 2021, Super League

- League Leaders' Shield

Winners (4): 2019, 2021, 2022, 2023

=== Cups ===
- Wheelchair Challenge Cup

Winners (3): 2019, 2021, 2022
