= Wheelchair rugby league =

Version of rugby league football

Wheelchair rugby league is a wheelchair-based version of rugby league football, one of two recognised disability versions of the sport. It was developed in France in 2000. Unlike other wheelchair sports, people without disabilities are allowed to compete in top-level competition.

== History ==
Wheelchair rugby league was developed by French rugby league players and coaches, Robert Fassolette and Wally Salvan, in 2000. The first competition was played by three teams, Vichy, Roanne and Beauvais, as part of a French Téléthon. Meetings establishing the official rules of the sport took place in 2002. The sport spread to the south of France with the establishment of teams from Perpignan, Cahors, and Montauban in 2004, and internationally after a tour by a French team to Australia and two exhibition matches played in England in 2005. In May 2006, the RLIF accepted a proposal by France to endorse wheelchair rugby league and a month later the first test match was played between France and a touring Great Britain team. The first international between England and France took place in 2007 and the following year the inaugural World Cup was held in Australia.

From its inception, until very recently, the top level of the sport was played no differently to other levels of the game. All matches took place in community sports halls, including international games, often with no-one in attendance. In 2013, the venue for the World Cup, Medway Park, had a crowd capacity of 500. Following France's win at that World Cup, a crowd of 2,700 was recorded for their next home match against England in 2014. In Australia, the attendance of 1,000 at the Wheelchair State of Origin match in 2019 was estimated to have been twice the size of the previous year. However, following the 2021 World Cup (played in 2022), where the competition was given equal prominence with the men's and women's game, the popularity of the sport, both during and after the tournament, exploded. Games of the 2021 tournament, and following matches, have since been played in major arenas in countries such as Australia, France, and the United Kingdom, often with several thousand in attendance. In the year following the 2021 World Cup, participation of the sport also rose by 71%.

In March 2024, wheelchair rugby league's first ever varsity fixture was played between Brunel University London and St Mary's University, Twickenham.

New Zealand made their international debut on 1 November 2024, marking the tenth nation to participate in the sport at international level.

== Geography ==
There are only ten countries with national wheelchair rugby league teams registered with the International Rugby League.

IRL Wheelchair World Rankings
Official rankings as of August 2026
Rank	Change	Team	Pts %
1	Steady	England	100
2	Steady	France	88
3	Steady	Ireland	67
4	Steady	Australia	64
5	Steady	Wales	43
6	Steady	Scotland	39
7	Steady	Spain	26
8	Steady	United States	22
9	Steady	New Zealand	5
10	Steady	Italy	0
Complete rankings at www.internationalrugbyleague.com

== Rules ==
The game shares many features with the regular rugby league:

- Use of a size 4 rugby ball
- Ball may only be passed backwards
- Each team retains possession for six tackles, after which there is a hand-over
- A modified version of the play-the-ball is used after a tackle
- Same offside rules as rugby league

The game then sees its own particular rules:

- Five players in each team
- All kicks – penalties, drop outs and conversions – are taken with the fist
- Matches are generally played on a handball court with dimensions of 40×20 metres
- Indoor rugby posts are put in place for conversions, drop kicks and penalty kicks
- In professional competition a maximum of two 'able bodied' players are allowed on the pitch per team

== International competitions ==
=== World Cup ===
The inaugural Wheelchair Rugby League World Cup was held at indoor venues in Sydney, Australia in 2008.

The 2013 Wheelchair RL World Cup was held in Gillingham, England in July. It saw a tightly fought game with big collisions culminate in a victory for France.

The 2017 World Cup was held in the south of France in July. The holders, France, triumphed over a strong England side in another tightly fought contest.

The 2021 World Cup (played in 2022 due to the COVID-19 pandemic) took place in England with 8 teams, England, Wales, Scotland, Ireland, France, Spain, USA and Australia. For the USA this was to be their first major tournament. England defeated France 28–24 in the final in Manchester with an attendance of 4,526, the largest in the sport's history. Also, in a world first, all matches were broadcast by the BBC.

==== World Cup summaries ====
Year	Host nation(s)	Teams	Final result		
Year	Host nation(s)	Teams	Winner	Score	Runner-up
2008	Sydney, Australia	4	England	44–12	Australia
2013	Gillingham, England	6	France	42–40	England
2017	France	7	France	38–34	England
2021	England	8	England	28–24	France
2026	Wollongong, Australia	8	England	50–38	France

=== European Championship ===
The Wheelchair Rugby League European Championship was first held in 2015 as a one off tournament. It is expected to occur every four years from 2023.

==== European Championship summaries ====
Year	Host nation(s)	Teams	Final result		
Year	Host nation(s)	Teams	Winner	Score	Runner-up
2015	Gillingham, England	5	England	28–24	France

=== Celtic Cup ===
The Celtic Cup has been held annually since 2015 and features the three Celtic nations of the British Isles – Ireland, Scotland, and Wales.

Titles

- Ireland: 4
- Scotland: 0
- Wales: 7

=== Fassolette-Kielty Trophy ===
The Fassolette-Kielty Trophy is a challenge competition between England and France, and is played for during all non-tournament tests.

Titles

- England: 5
- France: 7

=== The Ashes ===
The Ashes is a competition between Australia and England. It was first contested in 2019.

Titles

- Australia: 0
- England: 2

== Domestic competitions ==
(Australia) ARL

- NRL Wheelchair Championship
- Wheelchair State Challenge

(France) FFR

- Wheelchair Elite One Championship
- Wheelchair Elite Two Championship
- Coupe de France de Para Rugby XIII

(United Kingdom) RFL

- Wheelchair Super League
- Wheelchair Championship
- Wheelchair Challenge Cup
- Wheelchair Challenge Trophy

(Scotland) SRL

- Wheelchair Premiership (Note: Scottish clubs are not integrated into the British system but still participate in the Challenge Cup.)

(Wales) WRL

- Wheelchair Invitational League (Note: A separately run league outside of the British system. Welsh clubs participate in the Wheelchair Super League and Wheelchair Championship as their primary competition.)

Multi national

- European Club Challenge

== List of Clubs ==
=== England and Wales ===
The British domestic league is one of the more established in the world with teams from across the country taking part. They feature in the RFL Wheelchair Super League, Championship League and regional development leagues. Teams in Britain include:

Super League

- Bradford Bulls
- Edinburgh Giants
- Halifax Panthers
- Hull F.C.
- Leeds Rhinos
- London Roosters
- Sheffield Eagles
- Wigan Warriors

Championship

- Batley Bulldogs
- Castleford Tigers
- Gravesend Dynamite
- Midlands Hurricanes
- North Wales Crusaders
- Rochdale Hornets
- Wakefield Trinity
- York Knights

Wales

- Aber Valley Wolves
- Cardiff Blue Dragons
- North Wales Crusaders
- South Wales Jets

=== France ===
As with the running variant of the sport, most of the French wheelchair rugby league teams are situated in the south of the country. A list of clubs include:

Elite 1 – Pool A

- Aingirak Euskadi
- SO Avignon
- Catalans Dragons
- Cavaillon
- Montauban
- Stade Toulousian Olympique

Elite 1 – Pool B

- Catalan Dragons 2
- Saint Jory
- Stade Toulousian
- Toulon Provence Méditerranée (RFCTPM)
- Valencia – La Voulte

=== Scotland ===
Unlike the running game, the Scottish league is not integrated into the British rugby league system, however the teams have played in the all Great Britain Wheelchair Challenge Cup.

- Dundee Dragons
- Edinburgh Giants
- Glasgow RL

== See also ==
- IRL Wheelchair World Rankings
- Wheelchair sports
- Wheelchair rugby
- Wheelchair Australian rules football
