= Cyril Torres =

France international wheelchair rugby league player and coach

Personal information
- Full name: Cyril Torres
- Born: France

Playing information
Club
| Years | Team | Pld | T | G | FG | P |
|---|---|---|---|---|---|---|
| 2007–16 | Catalans Dragons |
| 2014–15 | → Canterbury Bulldogs | 6 |
| 2015 | → Leeds Rhinos |
| 2016–17 | Toulouse Olympique / Saint Jory |
| 2023– | Catalans Dragons |
| | Total | 6 | 0 | 0 | 0 | 0 |
Representative
| Years | Team | Pld | T | G | FG | P |
| –2017 | France |

Coaching information
Club
| Years | Team | Gms | W | D | L | W% |
| 2024– | France | 3 | 2 | 0 | 1 | 67 |

Cyril Torres is a French wheelchair rugby league player and coach who currently plays for Catalans Dragons in Elite One Championship. He is also the head coach of the France national wheelchair rugby league team whom he won two world cups with as a player and captain.

Torres also is part of the panel which decides the winner of the IRL Wheelchair Golden Boot.

== Playing career ==
=== Club ===
Torres was part of the Saint-Estève XIII Catalan academy and played for the club before a road traffic accident in 2001. Followed his recovery he became a professional Wheelchair Basketball player in Italy before he returned to rugby in 2007 with the Catalan Wheelchair side where he won six league titles. In the 2014–15 season, Torres also spent time with the Canterbury Bulldogs in Australia. Following the treble winning 2014–15 campaign with the Dragons, Torres joined Leeds Rhinos during the French off-season. In the 2016–17 season, he moved to Toulouse Olympique / Saint Jory where he won a further league title.

He initially retired following the 2017 World Cup. In 2023, he returned to Catalans Dragons following recovery of unspecified health issues. He played in Catalans 2024 European Club Challenge victory over Wigan.

=== International ===
Torres has represented France at three Wheelchair Rugby League World Cups. Torres's first World Cup title came in 2013. He missed the first part of the tournament after being injured during the warm-up match against Australia, but returned to captain the team in the final where he scored a try and kicked seven goals. At the 2017 World Cup he captained France to a title defence kicking two goals in the final.

== Coaching career ==
Torres has spend time as head coach of the Catalans Dragons women's team as well as being a video analyst for the men's team and Limoux Grizzlies. Upon his return to Catalans Dragons Wheelchair in 2023 he took up the role as player-coach. In 2024 he was announced as the head coach of the France national wheelchair rugby league team. His first game as head coach was a 2024 Fassolette-Kielty Trophy match against England, losing the game 33–66.

== Honours ==
=== Catalans Dragons ===
- Elite 1:
  - Champions (8): 2008–09, 2010–11, 2012–13, 2013–14, 2014–15, 2015–16, 2022–23, 2023–24
- Coupe de France:
  - Winners (7): 2010–11, 2011–12, 2012–13, 2013–14, 2014–15
- Challenge Cup:
  - Winners (2): 2023, 2024
- European Club Challenge:
  - Winners (2): 2024
- European Cup:
  - Winners (1): 2015

=== Toulouse Olympique / Saint Jory ===
- Elite 1:
  - Champions (1): 2016–17
- Coupe de France:
  - Winners (1): 2016–17

=== France ===
- World Cup:
  - Champions (2): 2013, 2017
