= 2021 Wheelchair Rugby League World Cup squads =

The 2021 Wheelchair Rugby League World Cup will feature eight international teams, with each consisting of up to a twelve-man squad.

== Group A ==
=== Australia ===
- Peter Arbuckle (Queensland)
- Cory Cannane (New South Wales)
- Craig Cannane (New South Wales)
- Richard Engles (New South Wales)
- Brad Grove (New South Wales)
- Shaun Harre (Queensland)
- James Hill (Queensland)
- Diab Karim (New South Wales)
- Liam Luff (New South Wales)
- Bayley McKenna (Queensland)
- Zac Schumacher (Queensland)
- Adam Tannock (Queensland).

=== England ===
- Seb Bechara (Catalans Dragons)
- Jack Brown (Halifax Panthers)
- Wayne Boardman (Halifax Panthers)
- Nathan Collins (Leeds Rhinos)
- Joe Coyd (London Roosters)
- Rob Hawkins (Halifax Panthers)
- Tom Halliwell (Leeds Rhinos)
- Lewis King (London Roosters)
- Adam Rigby (Wigan Warriors)
- Declan Roberts (Wigan Warriors)
- James Simpson (Leeds Rhinos)

=== Ireland ===
- Toby Burton-Carter (Warrington Wolves)
- Tom Martin (Halifax Panthers)
- Rick Rodgers (Argonauts Demi-gods and Skeleton Army)
- Stephen Campbell
- Paddy Forbes
- Kenneth Maloney (Gravesend Dynamite)
- Scott Robertson
- Peter Johnston (Argonauts Demi-gods and Skeleton Army)
- Phil Roberts (Wigan Warriors)
- James McCarthy
- Oran Spain
- Nash Jennings

=== Spain ===
- David Berty (St Toulousain)
- Jorge Gelade-Panzo (Dragons Handi)
- Theo Gonzalez (Handisport Roannais)
- Joel lacombe (Dragons Handi)
- Yannick Martin (Montauban)
- Fabien Moisdon (Dragons Handi)
- Raphaël Monedero (Dragons Handi)
- David Raymond (Biganos)
- Wilfrid Seron (St Toulousain)

== Group B ==
=== France ===
- Mostefa Abassi (Saint-Jory)
- Lionel Alazard (Montauban)
- Jérémy Bourson (Dragons Handi)
- Gilles Clausells (Dragons Handi)
- Nicolas Clausells (Dragons Handi)
- Dany Denuwelaere (Montauban)
- Thomas Duhalde (Euskadi)
- Florian Guttadoro (SO Avignon)
- Guillaume Mautz (SO Avignon)
- Julien Penella (Euskadi)
- Arno Vargas (Dragons Handi)
- Yann Verdi (SO Avignon)
- Jonathan Hivernat (Dragons Handi, standby)
- Adrien Zittel (Arbent, standby)

=== Scotland ===
- Dave Anderson (West Wales Raiders)
- Gregor Anderson (Dundee Dragons)
- David Birtles (Dundee Dragons)
- Connor Blackmore (Dundee Dragons)
- Dan Grant (Gravesend)
- Paul Hartley (Glasgow RL)
- Peter Lauder (unattached)
- Michael Mellon (Dundee Dragons)
- Graeme Stewart (Glasgow RL)
- Cadyn Thompson (Dundee Dragons)
- John Willans (Dundee Dragons)
- Callum Young (Warrington Wolves)

=== United States ===
- Jeffrey Townsend (captain)
- Jesse Lind (vice-captain)
- MacKenzie Johnson
- Michah Stewart
- William Johnstone
- Lavern Anderson
- Freddie Smith
- Gabi Cha
- Andy Kingsley
- Matthew Wooloff (Wigan Warriors)
- Jabrier Lee
- Jensen Blaine

=== Wales ===
- Stephen Halsey (North Wales Crusaders)
- Scott Trigg-Turner (North Wales Crusaders)
- Gary Preece (Hereford Harriers)
- Mason Baker (North Wales Crusaders)
- Jodie Boyd-Ward (Leeds Rhinos)
- Andrew Higgins (Hereford Harriers)
- Stuart Williams (North Wales Crusaders)
- Lucie Roberts (North Wales Crusaders)
- Martin Lane (Hereford Harriers)
- Mark Williams (Wigan Warriors)
- Harry Jones (North Wales Crusaders)
- Alan Caron (Hereford Harriers)
