= Seb Bechara =

England international wheelchair rugby league player

Seb Bechara MBE
Personal information
- Full name: Sebastien Joseph Bechara
- Born: 1993 (age 32–33) Nottingham, England, United Kingdom

Playing information
Club
Years	Team	Pld	T	G	FG	P
c. 2012/15–	Catalans Dragons
Representative
Years	Team	Pld	T	G	FG	P
c. 2015–	England

Seb Bechara MBE is an English wheelchair rugby league player who currently plays for Catalans Dragons in Elite One Championship and the England national wheelchair rugby league team. He is captain of both club and country.

In the King's 2023 Birthday Honours he was appointed Member of the Order of the British Empire for services to wheelchair rugby league football.

== Background ==
Seb Bechara is a disabled wheelchair rugby league player. He was born in Nottingham, England and moved to France aged nine. In adolescence he developed an interest in motorcycling. At aged 18 he suffered a motorcycle accident resulting in an amputation of one of his legs. Following his amputation, Bechara looked into getting into para swimming after watching the 2012 London Paralympics, though a chance meeting with then France captain Cyril Torres saw him take up wheelchair rugby league.

== Career ==
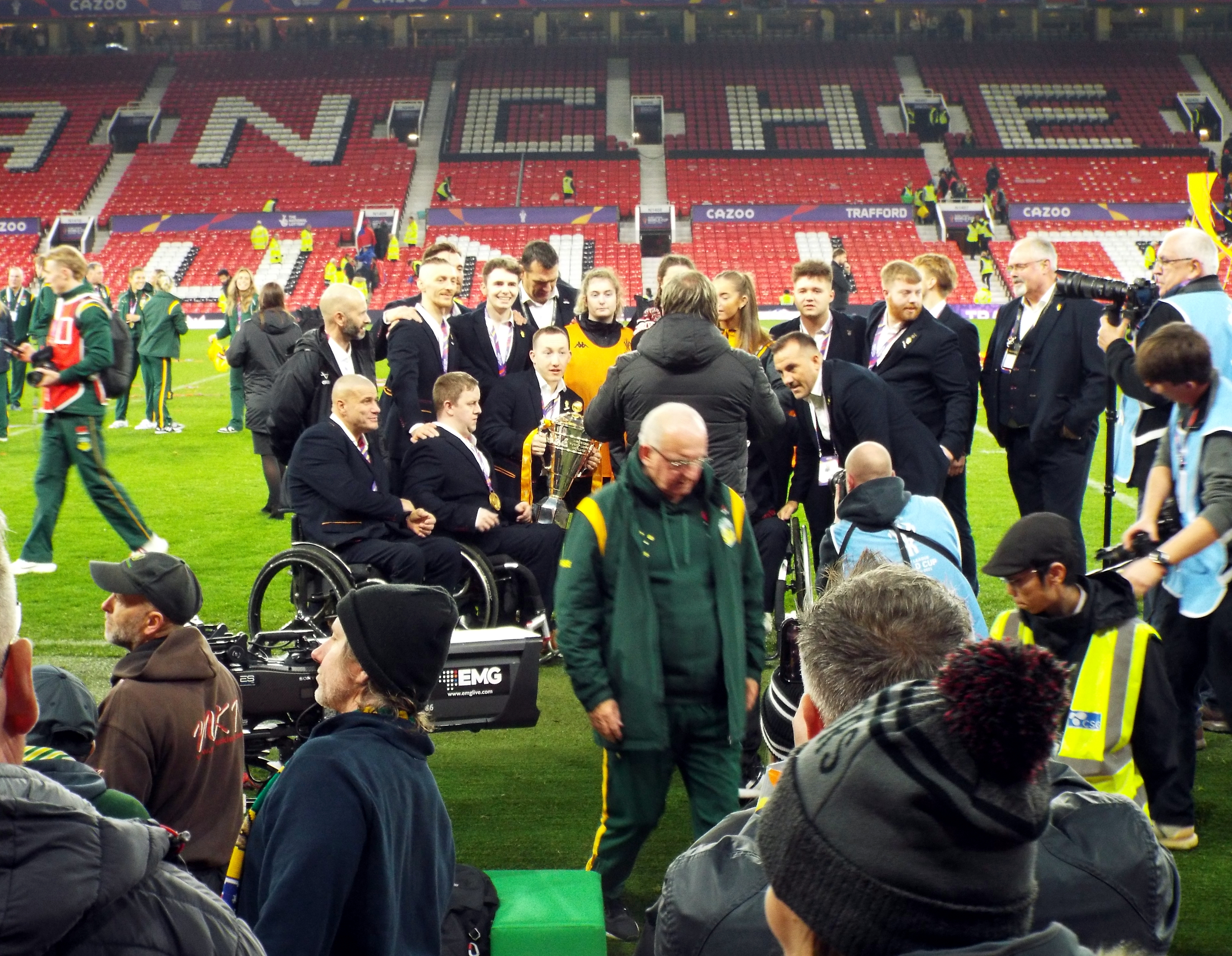
Bechara (hidden in view) with the England national wheelchair rugby league team, celebrating their 2021 World Cup victory at Old Trafford in 2022

=== Club ===
Seb Bechara has been successful in multiple Elite One Championship campaigns with Catalans Dragons. During the 2015 French off season, Bechara played for Leeds Rhinos. In 2022, Bechara won the second IRL Wheelchair Golden Boot after Jack Brown in 2019. In 2023, Bechara helped Catalans to win the inaugural European Club Challenge against UK champions Halifax after 32–32 draw resulted in a shared title. A few months later he captained Catalans to their first Challenge Cup title after scoring twice in the final, with the club making their debut the UK competition the season prior. 2024 saw Catalans win the European Club Challenge outright, beating Wigan 68–28 with Bechara getting a try in the match. Catalans also retained the Challenge Cup in 2024, again beating Wigan in the final.

=== International ===
Seb Bechara represented England at the Wheelchair Rugby League World Cup in 2017 where England finished runners-up losing to France in the final. Bechara was named as one of the top 10 players of the tournament. Bechara also represented England in the 2021 tournament, where England finished the tournament as champions, beating France 28–24 in the final. Bechara made team of the tournament.

== Honours ==
=== Catalans Dragons ===
- Elite 1:
  - Champions (9): 2012–13, 2013–14, 2014–15, 2015–16, 2017–18, 2018–19, 2021–22, 2022–23, 2023–24
- Coupe de France:
  - Winners (?):
- Challenge Cup:
  - Winners (2): 2023, 2024
- European Club Challenge:
  - Winners (2): 2023, 2024

=== England ===
- World Cup:
  - Champions (1): 2021
  - Runner-up (1): 2017

=== Individual ===
- IRL Wheelchair Golden Boot
  - Winners (1): 2022

=== Orders ===
- Order of the British Empire:
  - MBE: 2023 (services to wheelchair rugby league football)
