= List of Rugby League World Cup finals =

Rugby League World Cup final
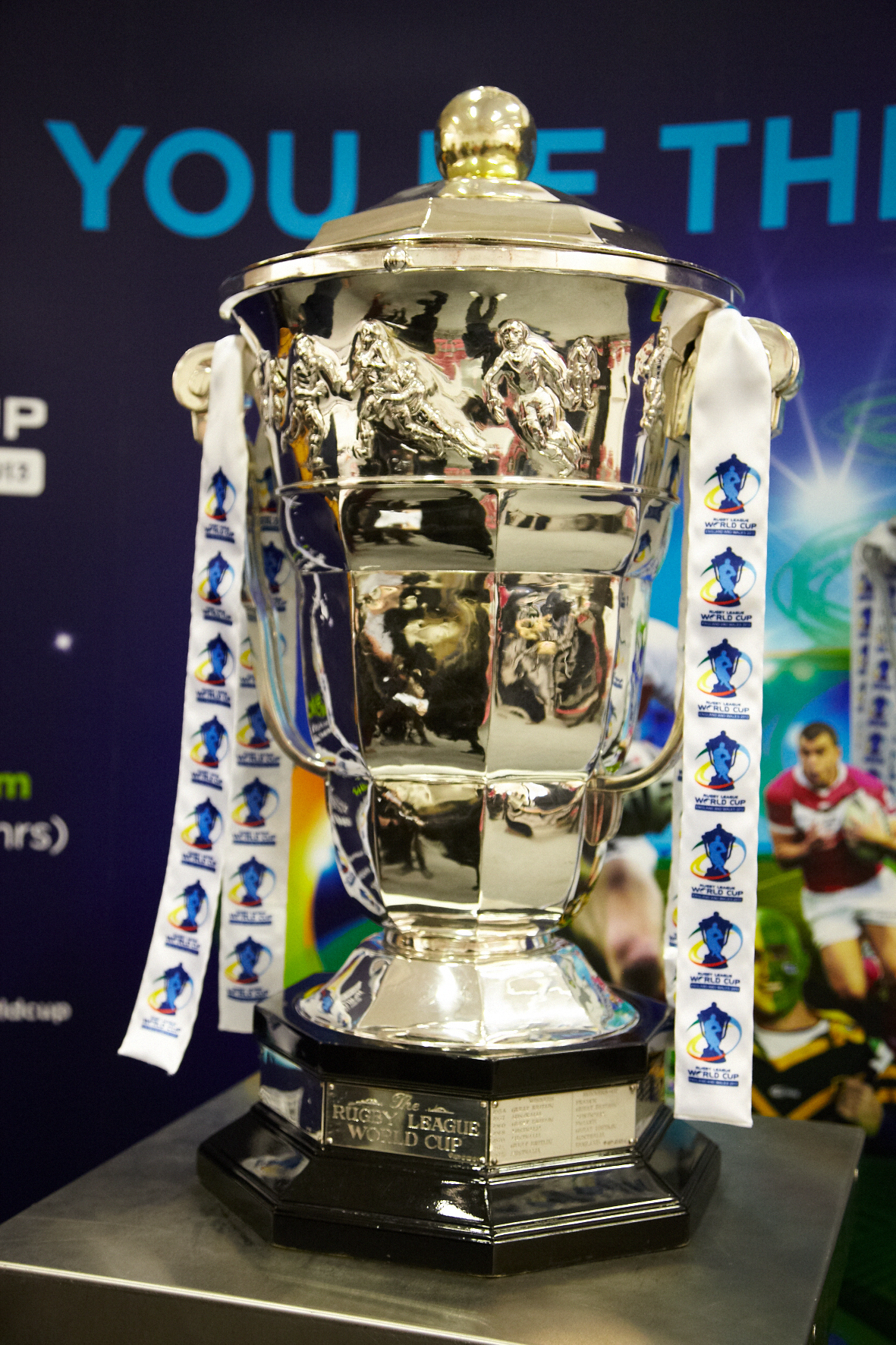
- Teams: 2
- First meeting: 1954 (men); 2000 (women); 2008 (wheelchair)
- Latest meeting: 2026 (men); 2026 (women); 2026 (wheelchair)
- Next meeting: 2030 (men); 2030 (women); 2030 (wheelchair)

Statistics
- Total meetings: 16 (men); 6 (women); 4 (wheelchair)
- Most wins: Australia (13 titles) (men); Australia (4 titles) (women); England (3 titles) (wheelchair)
- Largest victory: Australia 34–2 New Zealand (men); New Zealand 58–0 New Zealand Maori (women); England 44–12 Australia (wheelchair)

First held in 1954, the Rugby League World Cup is an international men's rugby league competition contested every several years between national teams of the members of International Rugby League, the sport's governing body. Australia has won the most Rugby League World Cup championships, with its thirteenth coming in the 2026 tournament in Australia, in which they defeated New Zealand. The women's version of the Rugby League World Cup was first held in 2000 followed by the Wheelchair Rugby League World Cup in 2008.

== History ==
The 1954 final was broadcast by the BBC with the whole match live in the UK via the Television Continental Exchange – a rare novelty for the time. Great Britain defeated France 16–12 and became the first men's team to lift the Rugby League World Cup.

The 1957 Rugby League World Cup was the second World Cup held for men’s national rugby league teams and was held between 15 and 25 June and hosted by Australia. Table toppers Australia were the winners as there was no Final at this World Cup. In 1960 the same format used in 1957 was used, with Great Britain winning their second World Cup after finishing top of the group.

The 1968 final attracted a then record crowd of 54,290 for a World Cup final. Australia defeated France 20–2 to win their second title. The 1970 final was keenly anticipated with Great Britain Having retained the Ashes against Australia during their 1970 Australasian tour, However it went completely against expectations as Britain failed to play any decent football despite overwhelming possession. Australia went on to utilise their meagre chances to the full, running out 12–7 victors.

The 1972 final was played between Great Britain and Australia on 11 November 1972 at the Stade de Gerland ground in Lyon, France. The final was played before 4,231 fans who witnessed what is the last British team to win the Rugby League World Cup. The 1975 Rugby League World Cup went back to a round Robin format. Australia were the winners for a fourth time after topping the group table.

Australia went into the 1977 Final as favourites. However, led by experienced captain Roger Millward, the Lions managed to dominate possession throughout the game, and it took a last minute try from Australian halfback John Kolc (playing his only international game for Australia) to secure the trophy.

The 1988 final was played between New Zealand and Australia on 9 October 1988 at Eden Park in Auckland, New Zealand. Australia won the final 25–12 in front of a New Zealand rugby league record attendance of 47,363. Australia, the defending champions, won the Rugby League World Cup for the 6th time. The 1992 final was played between Great Britain and Australia on 24 October 1992 at Wembley Stadium in London, England. Australia won the final 10–6 in front of an international record crowd of 73,631.

The 1995 final was the conclusive game of the 1995 Centenary World Cup tournament and was played between England and Australia on 28 October 1995 at the Wembley Stadium in London, England. Australia won the final 16–8 in front of 66,540 fans. The 2000 final was a high-scoring final at Old Trafford between Australia and New Zealand, with the Kangaroos overwhelming their Trans-Tasman opponents. Wendell Sailor scored two tries and Mat Rogers had a near-perfect afternoon with the boot as the Australians ran out 40–12 winners.

The 2000 women's inaugural final was held in Warrington. New Zealand defeated Great Britain 26–4 and became the first women's team to lift the Women's Rugby League World Cup. New Zealand currently has three titles.

The 2008 final played between New Zealand and Australia on 22 November 2008 at Brisbane's Lang Park, was a replay of the 2000 Rugby League World Cup final. Considered one of the biggest upsets in rugby league, New Zealand defeated Australia 34–20 to claim their first ever World Cup title. Also in 2008, England won the inaugural Wheelchair Rugby League World Cup title. The 2013 final was played between New Zealand and Australia on 30 November 2013 at Old Trafford, Manchester, England. Australia won the final by 34–2 in front of a sell-out crowd of 74,468. The 2013 women's final was won by Australia for the first time and Australia currently also has three titles alongside New Zealand. France became the second European team to win the first Wheelchair Rugby League World Cup title.

In 2017 Australia became the winners of the Rugby League World Cup for a record eleventh time, beating England 6–0 in Brisbane to retain the Paul Barrière Trophy and become the first team since 1977 to win the World Cup on home soil. The 2021 final was played between Australia and first time finalists Samoa on 19 November 2022 at Old Trafford in Manchester, England. Australia won their 12th title 30–10 in front of a crowd of 67,502.

The 2026 men's and women's finals took place as a double-header for the third time in Lang Park, Brisbane on 15 November 2026, two days after the 2026 wheelchair final in WIN Entertainment Centre, Wollongong. Australia won both the men's and women's finals against New Zealand, 32–12 and 34–10 respectively, whilst England prevailed in the wheelchair competition against France 50–38. The women's victory saw Australia become the outright winningest nation in the women's competition, with four trophies ahead of New Zealand's three.

== List of Finals ==
=== Men's Rugby League World Cup ===
Key to the list
a.e.t.	Match was won during extra time

Year	Winners	Final Score	Runners-up	Venue	Location	Attendance
1954	Great Britain	16–12	France	Parc des Princes	Paris, France	30,368
1957	Australia	(Note: There was no official World Cup final match in 1957 and 1960. The tournament winner was decided by a round robin contested by four teams.)	Great Britain	N/A		
1960	Great Britain	(Note: There was no official World Cup final match in 1957 and 1960. The tournament winner was decided by a round robin contested by four teams.)	Australia	N/A		
1968	Australia	20–2	France	Sydney Cricket Ground	Sydney, Australia	54,290
1970	Australia	12–7	Great Britain	Headingley Stadium	Leeds, England	18,776
1972	Great Britain	10–10	Australia	Stade de Gerland	Lyon, France	4,231
1975	Australia	—N/a	England	N/A		
1977	Australia	13–12	Great Britain	Sydney Cricket Ground	Sydney, Australia	24,457
1988	Australia	25–12	New Zealand	Eden Park	Auckland, New Zealand	47,363
1992	Australia	10–6	Great Britain	Wembley Stadium	London, England	73,631
1995	Australia	16–8	England	Wembley Stadium	London, England	66,540
2000	Australia	40–12	New Zealand	Old Trafford	Manchester, England	44,329
2008	New Zealand	34–20	Australia	Lang Park	Brisbane, Australia	50,559
2013	Australia	34–2	New Zealand	Old Trafford	Manchester, England	74,468
2017	Australia	6–0	England	Lang Park	Brisbane, Australia	40,033
2021	Australia	30–10	Samoa	Old Trafford	Manchester, England	67,502
2026	Australia	32–12	New Zealand	Lang Park	Brisbane, Australia	52,461

=== Women's Rugby League World Cup ===
Year	Winners	Final Score	Runners-up	Venue	Location	Attendance
2000	New Zealand	26–4	Great Britain	Wilderspool Stadium	Warrington, England	1,262
2003	New Zealand	58–0	New Zealand Maori	North Harbour Stadium	Auckland, New Zealand	n/a
2008	New Zealand	34–0	Australia	Lang Park	Brisbane, Australia	n/a
2013	Australia	22–12	New Zealand	Headingley Stadium	Leeds, England	n/a
2017	Australia	23–16	New Zealand	Lang Park	Brisbane, Australia	n/a
2021	Australia	54–4	New Zealand	Old Trafford	Manchester, England	67,502
2026	Australia	34–10	New Zealand	Lang Park	Brisbane, Australia	52,461

=== Wheelchair Rugby League World Cup ===
Year	Winners	Final Score	Runners-up	Venue	Location	Attendance
2008	England	44–12	Australia	Betts Stadium	Mount Druitt, Sydney	n/a
2013	France	42–40	England	Medway Park Sports Centre	Gillingham, England	n/a
2017	France	38–34	England	Parc des Expositions	Perpignan, France	2,500
2021	England	28–24	France	Manchester Central Convention Complex	Manchester, England	4,526
2026	England	50–38	France	WIN Entertainment Centre	Wollongong, Australia	TBA

=== Team performance (men) ===
National Team	Winners	Runners-up	Years won	Years runner-up
Australia	13	3	1957, 1968, 1970, 1975, 1977, 1988, 1992, 1995, 2000, 2013, 2017, 2021, 2026	1960, 1972, 2008
Great Britain; England	3	7	1954, 1960, 1972	1957, 1970, 1975, 1977, 1992, 2000, 2013
New Zealand	1	4	2008	1988, 2000, 2013, 2026
France	0	2	–	1954, 1968
Samoa	0	1	–	2021

=== Team performance (women) ===
National Team	Winners	Runners-up	Years won	Years runner-up
Australia	4	1	2013, 2017, 2021, 2026	2008
New Zealand	3	4	2000, 2003, 2008	2013, 2017, 2021, 2026
Great Britain	0	1		2000
New Zealand Māori	0	1		2003

=== Team performance (wheelchair) ===
National Team	Winners	Runners-up	Years won	Years runner-up
England	3	2	2008, 2021, 2026	2013, 2017
France	2	2	2013, 2017	2021, 2026
Australia	0	1		2008

== See also ==
- List of Rugby Union World Cup finals
- List of Women's Rugby Union World Cup finals
