= 2021 Wheelchair Rugby League World Cup final =

2021 Wheelchair Rugby League World Cup Final
France	England
24	28
	1	2	Total
FRA	14	10	24
ENG	12	16	28
- Date: 18 November 2022
- Stadium: Manchester Central Convention Complex
- Location: Manchester, England
- Player of the Match: Tom Halliwell (England)
- Referees: Ollie Cruickshank (Scotland), Laurent Abrial (France)
- Attendance: 4,526

Broadcast partners
- Broadcasters: BBC (United Kingdom)
- Commentators: JJ Chalmers; Mark Wilson; Kyle Amor; Freya Levy

The final of the 2021 Wheelchair Rugby League World Cup was one of three finals of the integrated 2021 Rugby League World Cup (postponed and held in 2022). It was played at Manchester Central Convention Complex in Manchester on 18 November 2022, the day before the men's and women's finals.

England beat France 28–24 to win their second title.

== Background ==
England and France were the two top-rated teams in the IRL Wheelchair World Rankings going into the tournament. They were in separate groups for the group stage matches. England won the first tournament in 2008, with France defeating England in the final of the two other tournaments in 2013 and 2017.

== Route to the final ==
Both France and England topped their groups with three-figure points differences, having each won all three of their group matches. France won their semi-final against Australia by over 40 points, while England won theirs against Wales by over 100 points.

== Match ==
18 November 2022
19:30 GMT (UTC±00:00)

France	24–28	England
Tries: Alazard 10'; Abassi 29'; G Clausells 57'; Goals: Alazard (1/1); N Clausells (5/6)	Report	Tries: Halliwell (2) 19', 78'; Brown (2) 39', 53'; King 42'; Goals: Hawkins (1/1); Collins (3/5)

Manchester Central, Manchester
Attendance: 4,526
Referees: Ollie Cruickshank (Scotland), Laurent Abrial (France)
Touch judges: David Butler (England), David Roig (France)
Player of the Match: Tom Halliwell (England)

Team details
France		Position	England
Name	Number	Position	Number	Name
Mostefa Abassi	3	Starter	7	Tom Halliwell (c)
Lionel Alazard	1	Starter	2	Robert Hawkins
Jérémy Bourson	4	Starter	3	Joe Coyd
Julien Pennella	6	Starter	4	Seb Bechara
Nicolas Clausells	8	Starter	5	Lewis King
Florian Guttadoro	10	Interchange	1	Nathan Collins
Jonathan Hivernat	11	Interchange	6	Jack Brown
Guillaume Mautz	12	Interchange	9	Declan Roberts
Gilles Clausells (c)	2	Interchange	10	Wayne Boardman
Arno Vargas	7	Interchange	11	James Simpson
Sylvain Crismanovich		Coach		Tom Coyd

=== Summary ===
The match was tight throughout, with the teams matching each other try-for-try in the first half, the only difference in points coming with penalty kicks and conversions, France leading by two points at half time. During the second half, the scores were levelled and then, with quick successive penalties for both sides, levelled again. Three minutes before the end of the match, England captain Tom Halliwell scored a try to give his team the lead, which they held on to until the final klaxon.

England captain Tom Halliwell was named the player of the match, with England's Seb Bechara winning the Golden Boot for the tournament.

== Post match ==
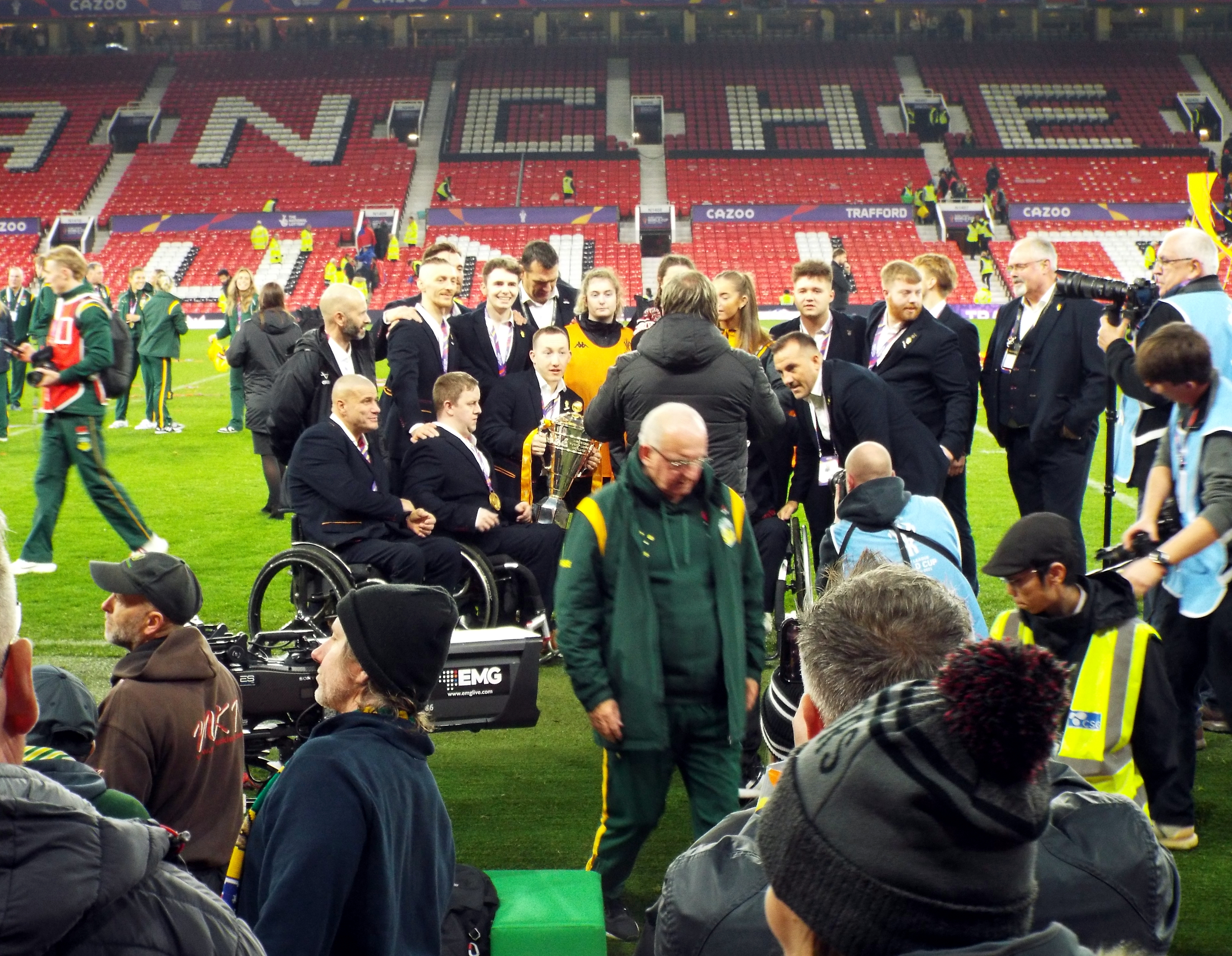
The England team celebrating their world cup victory at Old Trafford

The next day, the England team celebrated their victory at Old Trafford with the Australian men's and women's teams following their victories in their respective finals.

== Controversies ==
=== Referee behaviour ===
Wheelchair rugby league uses two principal referees, one for attack and one for defence. The defence referee, Frenchman Laurent Abrial, was criticised for a lack of professionalism throughout the match, making controversial calls against England; openly disagreeing with other officials' calls; "throwing a tantrum"; and being seen to rile up the crowd. League Unlimited felt that Abrial's behaviour "overshadowed what was a great game of football", while The Examiner instead said that Halliwell's late try to win the match overshadowed the behaviour, though noted Abrial soured the major event. During the winners' ceremony, Abrial was booed by the crowd. The live commentary team described him as a "pantomime villain". Journalists; players; commentators; and other referees gave criticisms of Abrial's behaviour on Twitter, with fans using the social media platform to call for disciplinary action.

In the days after the final, it was announced that Abrial's behaviour was under official review by the International Rugby League (IRL), to determine whether there should be a misconduct investigation. On 21 November 2022 the French Rugby League Federation announced that Abrial is suspended from all refereeing duties until the IRL investigation is complete.

On 9 June 2023 it was announced that Abrial had been suspended for three years until the start of the 2026 season following the conclusion of the investigation. The International Rugby League misconduct committee concluded he had "brought the game into disrepute through unacceptable behaviour".

== Legacy ==
The Guardian wrote that wheelchair rugby league "felt like the world's best-kept secret", given its anonymity before the 2021 World Cup and its sudden large popularity among sport fans watching for the first time due to its mainstream television broadcast; England coach Tom Coyd said the response was unbelievable and that he could see the sport "going to explode". It was also suggested that the inclusivity, with people able to start playing as beginners at any age and ability level, contributed to the forecasted uptake in the sport. Current and former England players also reflected on the media interest and popularity, and wanting to continue to build on the legacy following the win.

The final had a world record attendance for a wheelchair rugby league match, with an official figure of 4,526. It was reported that there was a television audience of millions.
