= Gilles Clausells =

France international wheelchair rugby league player

Personal information
- Full name: Gilles Clausells
- Born: 21 December 1962 (age 63) France

Playing information
Club
| Years | Team | Pld | T | G | FG | P |
|---|---|---|---|---|---|---|
| before 2009– | Catalans Dragons |
Representative
| Years | Team | Pld | T | G | FG | P |
| 2006– | France |
- Relatives: Nicolas Clausells (nephew)

Gilles Clausells is a French wheelchair rugby league player who currently plays for Catalans Dragons in Elite One Championship and the France national wheelchair rugby league team of whom he is the captain.

== Career ==
=== Club ===
Gilles Clausells has been a player of Catalans Dragons since its inception and has been a key player in multiple successful Elite One Championship campaigns with the club. In 2023, Clausells helped Catalans to win the inaugural European Club Challenge against UK champions Halifax after 32–32 draw resulted in a shared title. A few months later he helped Catalans secure their first Challenge Cup, with the club making their debut the UK competition the season prior. 2024 saw Catalans win the European Club Challenge outright, beating Wigan 68–28. Catalans also retained the Challenge Cup in 2024, again beating Wigan in the final.

=== International ===
Gilles Clausells is one the original players of French wheelchair rugby league. He is the current captain of the national side and has represented France at every Wheelchair Rugby League World Cup. France finished third in the inaugural 2008 tournament before winning the tournament in 2013, with Clausells scoring a hatrick in the final. France defended their title in 2017 where Clausells won player of the tournament. He finished as runners up with France in the 2021 tournament.

== Personal life ==
Clausells is the uncle of fellow France and Catalans teammate Nicolas Clausells.

== Honours ==
=== Catalans Dragons ===
- Elite 1:
  - Champions (11): 2008–09, 2010–11, 2012–13, 2013–14, 2014–15, 2015–16, 2017–18, 2018–19 2021–22, 2022–23, 2023–24
- Coupe de France:
  - Winners (6): 2010–11, 2011–12, 2012–13, 2013–14, 2014–15, 2017–18
- Challenge Cup:
  - Winners (2): 2023, 2024
- European Club Challenge:
  - Winners (2): 2023, 2024

=== France ===
- World Cup:
  - Champions (2): 2013, 2017
  - Runner-up (1): 2021

=== Individual ===
- RLWC: Player of the Tournament
  - Winners (1): 2017
