= Nicolas Clausells =

France international wheelchair rugby league player

Personal information
- Full name: Nicolas Clausells
- Born: 18 January 1990 (age 36) France

Playing information
Club
Years	Team	Pld	T	G	FG	P
c. 2011–	Catalans Dragons
Representative
Years	Team	Pld	T	G	FG	P
c. 2011–	France
- Relatives: Gilles Clausells (uncle)

Nicolas Clausells is a French wheelchair rugby league player who currently plays for Catalans Dragons in Elite One Championship and the France national wheelchair rugby league team.

== Career ==
=== Club ===
Nicolas Clausells has been a playing for Catalans Dragons since around 2011 and has been a key player in multiple successful Elite One Championship campaigns with the club. In 2023, Clausells helped Catalans to win the inaugural European Club Challenge against UK champions Halifax scoring twice in a 32–32 draw resulted in a shared title. A few months later he scored five tries and eight goals helping Catalans secure their first Challenge Cup, with the club making their debut the UK competition the season prior. Catalans retained the Challenge Cup in 2024, beating Wigan 81–18 in the final, scoring three tries and kicking for goals.

=== International ===
Nicolas Clausells began representing France before the 2013 Wheelchair Rugby League World Cup, he was selected for the tournament in which France won. He was selected again for the 2017 tournament which saw him score a hatrick in the final. Clausells was again a key player in the 2021 tournament making team of the tournament, though France finished as runners-up to England this time out. In the 2024 internationals, Clausells scored 28 points in France's 32–28 over England after coming off the bench around the 30th minute.

== Personal life ==
Clausells is the nephew of fellow France and Catalans teammate Gilles Clausells.

== Honours ==
=== Catalans Dragons ===
- Elite 1:
  - Champions (10): 2010–11, 2012–13, 2013–14, 2014–15, 2015–16, 2017–18, 2018–19 2021–22, 2022–23, 2023–24
- Coupe de France:
  - Winners (6): 2010–11, 2011–12, 2012–13, 2013–14, 2014–15, 2017–18
- Challenge Cup:
  - Winners (2): 2023, 2024
- European Club Challenge:
  - Winners (2): 2023

=== France ===
- World Cup:
  - Champions (2): 2013, 2017
  - Runner-up (1): 2021
