= Harry Brown (sports person) =

English para sports person (born 1994)

- Born: Harrison Brown; 21 June 1994 (age 32); Halifax, West Yorkshire, England
- Rugby league career

Playing information
Club
Years	Team	Pld	T	G	FG	P
	Calderdale
	Halifax Panthers
	Total	0	0	0	0	0
Representative
Years	Team	Pld	T	G	FG	P
	England Wheelchair
- Basketball career

BSR AMIAB Albacete

Career history
- ????–????: Sheffield Steelers
- ????–present: BSR AMIAB Albacete
- 2011–present: (United Kingdom) Great Britain Wheelchair

Harry Brown (born 21 June 1994) is an English para sports person from Halifax, West Yorkshire who has represented England at wheelchair rugby league and Great Britain in wheelchair basketball in numerous international tournaments. He currently plays only wheelchair basketball for BSR AMIAB Albacete in Spain.

== Background ==
Harry Brown lost his legs to meningitis as a baby. He began playing wheelchair rugby league at aged 11, later getting his older brother (and future club and international teammate) Jack into the sport. He started playing wheelchair basketball as well before adulthood.

== Wheelchair Rugby League ==
=== Club ===
Brown spent most of his club career at Halifax alongside Jack. He won the inaugural 2019 Super League title with Halifax. Brown moved permanently to wheelchair basketball before the 2021 Wheelchair Rugby League World Cup but made a one match return for Halifax against Wigan in the 2024 Wheelchair Super League. He scored six tries in the match.

=== International ===
Harry Brown represented England and the Wheelchair Rugby League World Cup in 2008 (scoring two tries in the final) 2013 (scoring four tries in the final), and 2017. England were champions in 2008 and finished runners-up in the subsequent tournaments.

== Wheelchair Basketball ==
Harry Brown made his Great Britain début in 2011, aged 16, at the 2011 Para World Cup. He narrowly missed out on selection for Great Britain at the 2012 Summer Paralympics. Four years later he made the squad for the 2016 edition and again for 2020 and 2024. Great Britain took home Bronze in both the 2016 and 2020 tournaments, followed by a Silver in 2024.

== Personal life ==
Harry Brown is a father of two and enjoys video games in his spare time.

== Honours ==
=== Wheelchair Rugby League ===
==== Halifax ====
- Super League (and predecessor tournaments):
  - Champions (4): 2015, 2016, 2018, 2019
- Challenge Cup:
  - Champions (3): 2015, 2016, 2017

==== England ====
- World Cup:
  - Champions (1): 2008
  - Runner-up (2): 2013, 2017

=== Wheelchair Basketball ===
==== Great Britain ====
- Summer Paralympics:
  - Silver (1): 2024
  - Bronze (2): 2016, 2020
- World Championship:
  - Champions (1): 2018
  - Runners-up (1): 2022
- European Championship:
  - Champions (4): 2011, 2013, 2015, 2019
  - Runners-up (2): 2017, 2021

=== Individual ===
- Wheelchair Sports Person of the Year
  - Winner (1): 2016
