= England Rugby =

England Rugby may refer to:

- England national rugby union team
- England women's national rugby union team
- England national rugby league team
- England women's national rugby league team
- England national wheelchair rugby league team
- Rugby Football Union the governing body of rugby union in England
- Rugby Football League the governing body of rugby league in England
- Rugby, England a town in Warwickshire
