= European Club Challenge =

Wheelchair rugby league competition

Wheelchair Super League
- Current season, competition or edition: 2024 European Club Challenge
- Sport: Wheelchair rugby league
- Founded: 2023; 3 years ago
- No. of teams: 2
- Country: England; France; Wales
- Most recent champion: Catalans Dragons
- Most titles: Catalans Dragons (2 titles)

The European Club Challenge is a single match wheelchair rugby league competition played between the previous season's British Super League and French Elite 1 champions. The competition was established in 2023 and is similar in concept to the World Club Challenge in the running game.

The competition was originally proposed in 2011. In 2015, a European Cup competition took place between Catalans Dragons and Leyland Warriors. It was played over two legs with both being won by the French team; 40–30 in England and 54–20 in France.

Catalans Dragons are the most successful club in the competition, winning two out of two titles, one shared and one outright.

== Results ==
2023 European Club Challenge

25 August 2023
19:30 CEST (UTC+02:00)

Catalans Dragons	32–32	Halifax Panthers
Tries: G. Clausells, N. Clausells (4), Dore; Goals: N. Clausells (4/6)	report	Tries: Bourson (2), Hawkins (2), Holt; Goals: Boardman (6)

Sports Complex Germanor, Cabestany

Team details
Catalans Dragons		Position	Halifax Panthers
Name	Number	Position	Number	Name
Gilles Clausells	1	Starter	1	Wayne Boardman
Joel Lacombe	2	Starter	2	Jérémy Bourson
Nicolas Clausells	3	Starter	3	Seb Bechara
Arno Vargas	4	Starter	4	Nathan Holmes
Damien Dore	5	Starter	5	Rob Hawkins
Victor Puly	6	Interchange	6	Jordan Holt
Fabian Plaza	7	Interchange	7	Thomas Martin
Joel Gelade Panzo	8	Interchange	8	Kieron Johnston
Gilles Clausells		Coach		Wayne Boardman

2024 European Club Challenge

6 April 2024
18:00 BST (UTC+01:00)

Wigan Warriors	28–68	Catalans Dragons
Tries: D. Roberts (3), Rigby (2); Goals: D. Roberts (4/5)	report	Tries: Dore (5), Bourson (5), Bechara, Vargas; Goals: Bechara (10/13)

Robin Park Arena, Wigan
Referees: David Butler, Djamel Merzouk
Player of the Match: Arno Vargas

Team details
Wigan Warriors		Position	Catalans Dragons
Name	Number	Position	Number	Name
Chris Greenhalgh	1	Starter	10	Seb Bechara (c)
Nathan Roberts	4	Starter	12	Jérémy Bourson
Declan Roberts (c)	7	Starter	28	Damien Dore
Adam Rigby	8	Starter	8	Victor Puly
Phil Roberts	9	Starter	10	Arno Vargas
Martin Lane	3	Interchange	1	Gilles Clausells
Mark Williams	10	Interchange	2	Joel Lacombe
Matt Wooloff	15	Interchange	9	Joel Gelade Panzo
		Interchange	13	Cyril Torres
Chris Greenhalgh		Coach		Gilles Clausells

== Titles ==
Club	No.	Years
Catalans Dragons	2	2023, 2024
Halifax Panthers	1	2023

Italics indicates shared title
