= Elizabeth Ferris =

Elizabeth Ferris may refer to:

- Elizabeth Ferris (diver) (1940–2012), British diver
- Elizabeth Ferris (wheelchair rugby) (born c. 1986), wheelchair rugby player
- Elizabeth G. Ferris (born c. 1950), Brookings fellow
