= 2017 Festival of World Cups =

Rugby competition in Sydney, Australia

- Host countries: Australia; New Zealand; Papua New Guinea

The 2017 Festival of World Cups was a series of rugby league world cups that were held in Sydney, Australia during July 2017. As part of the festival, there was University World Cup and a Defence Force World Cup. It was originally intended that the event would also include a Police World Cup and the Wheelchair Rugby League World Cup. In May 2016, the World Cup organising committee raised concerns over financial support for the festival and in November 2016, it was announced that the 2017 Wheelchair World Cup would be held in France.

The festival was part of the build-up to the 2017 Women's Rugby League World Cup and the 2017 Men's Rugby League World Cup which were held in Australia, New Zealand, and Papua New Guinea in October and November 2017.

== Universities World Cup ==
The Universities World Cup was won by Australia. It was their sixth title.

=== Pool A ===
| Team | Pld | W | D | L | PF | PA | +/− | Pts |
|---|---|---|---|---|---|---|---|---|
| Australia | 3 | 3 | 0 | 0 | 162 | 34 | +128 | 6 |
| Pacific Islands | 3 | 2 | 0 | 1 | 104 | 78 | +26 | 4 |
| Ireland | 3 | 0 | 0 | 3 | 36 | 132 | –96 | 0 |

=== Pool B ===
| Team | Pld | W | D | L | PF | PA | +/− | Pts |
|---|---|---|---|---|---|---|---|---|
| Scotland | 3 | 2 | 0 | 1 | 106 | 70 | +36 | 6 |
| England | 3 | 2 | 0 | 1 | 62 | 78 | -16 | 4 |
| Wales | 3 | 0 | 0 | 3 | 32 | 110 | –78 | 0 |

=== Finals ===
Semi-finals
Australia | 46
England | 18
Scotland | 12
Pacific Islands | 44

Final
Australia | 30
Pacific Islands | 12

== Defence Force World Cup ==
The Defence Force World Cup was won by Fiji. Fiji, who was a last minute replacement when Serbia withdrew, currently hold both the rugby league and rugby union Defence Force titles.

A women's international defence force series was also held between Australia and New Zealand. Australia won the three match series, 3–0.

| Team | Pld | W | D | L | PF | PA | +/− | Pts |
|---|---|---|---|---|---|---|---|---|
| Australia | 3 | 3 | 0 | 0 | 140 | 44 | +96 | 6 |
| Fiji | 3 | 2 | 0 | 1 | 104 | 64 | +40 | 4 |
| United Kingdom | 3 | 1 | 0 | 2 | 72 | 108 | –36 | 2 |
| New Zealand | 3 | 0 | 0 | 3 | 32 | 132 | –100 | 0 |

=== Final ===
16 July 2017
13:45

| Australia | 12 - 44 | Fiji |

Pepper Stadium, Sydney

== Wheelchair World Cup ==
2017 Wheelchair Rugby League World Cup
- Number of teams: 7
- Host country: France
- Winner: France

The Wheelchair World Cup took place in southern France between 20 July and 28 July. Seven teams took part with the semi-finalists from 2013 (Australia, England, France and Wales) placed in Group A and Italy, Spain and Scotland in Group B. France won 38–34 in the final against England to retain the title. Australia finished third after defeating newcomers Italy 58–45 and Spain, who were also making their first appearance at the world cup, lost 45–66 to Wales in the fifth-place play-off match.

=== Final ===
28 July 2017

| France | 38 - 34 | England |

Parc des Expositions, Perpignan
