= IRL Golden Boot Award =

International rugby league award

The IRL Golden Boot Award (previously Open Rugby Golden Boot Award and Rugby League World Golden Boot Award) is an annual rugby league award, presented by the International Rugby League (IRL), awarded to the best player of the calendar year. There are a categories for men's, women's and wheelchair players.

The IRL purchased the rights to the award from League Publications Ltd. in 2017, who in turn purchased it from its original awarders Open Rugby in 1998 who started the award in 1984.

Upon purchase IRL introduced a women's category starting in 2018, with the wheelchair category coming a year later.

== History ==
The award was created by zine Open Rugby. It was first awarded to Wally Lewis for his performances throughout 1984.

No award was made between 1990 and 1998 due to organisational difficulties.

League Publications Ltd bought the rights to the award in 1999 and began awarding the Golden Boot on the same year it was assessed.

Andrew Johns collected the award in 1999 and again in 2001, becoming the first player to win it twice. Darren Lockyer repeated that feat, winning in 2003 and 2006 becoming the first player to win twice while playing in different positions.

In 2011, Rugby League World magazine began to award retrospective Golden Boots to fill in "the missing years" of 1990 to 1998, starting with Garry Schofield who was adjudged to have won the 1990 Golden Boot.

No further Golden Boots were retrospectively awarded as sponsors Adidas withdrew their backing.

The International Rugby League purchased the rights to award the Golden Boot in 2017.

== Winners - Men ==
Year	Nat.	Player	Club(s)	Position	Ref.
Open Rugby Golden Boot
1984	(Australia)	Wally Lewis	Wynnum-Manly Seagulls; Wakefield Trinity	Five-eighth/Stand-off	
1985	(Australia)	Brett Kenny	Parramatta Eels	Five-eighth	
1986	(Australia)	Garry Jack	Balmain Tigers	Fullback	
1987 (Note: The 1987 Golden Boot was shared by two winners)	(New Zealand)	Hugh McGahan	Eastern Suburbs Roosters	Second-row	
1987	(Australia)	Peter Sterling	Parramatta Eels	Halfback	
1988	(England)	Ellery Hanley	Wigan; Balmain Tigers	Five-eighth/Stand-off	
1989	(Australia)	Mal Meninga	Canberra Raiders	Centre	
1990 (Note: Retrospective award made in 2011)	(England)	Garry Schofield	Leeds	Stand-off	
1991–98	No award given				
Rugby League World Golden Boot
1999	(Australia)	Andrew Johns	Newcastle Knights	Halfback	
2000	(Australia)	Brad Fittler	Sydney Roosters	Five-eighth	
2001	(Australia)	Andrew Johns (2)	Newcastle Knights	Halfback	
2002	(New Zealand)	Stacey Jones	New Zealand Warriors	Halfback	
2003	(Australia)	Darren Lockyer	Brisbane Broncos	Fullback	
2004	(England)	Andy Farrell	Wigan Warriors	Loose forward	
2005	(Australia)	Anthony Minichiello	Sydney Roosters	Fullback	
2006	(Australia)	Darren Lockyer (2)	Brisbane Broncos	Five-eighth	
2007	(Australia)	Cameron Smith	Melbourne Storm	Hooker	
2008	(Australia)	Billy Slater	Melbourne Storm	Fullback	
2009	(Australia)	Greg Inglis	Melbourne Storm	Centre	
2010	(New Zealand)	Benji Marshall	Wests Tigers	Five-eighth	
2011	(Australia)	Johnathan Thurston	North Queensland Cowboys	Halfback	
2012	(England)	Kevin Sinfield	Leeds Rhinos	Stand-off	
2013	(Australia)	Johnathan Thurston (2)	North Queensland Cowboys	Five-eighth	
2014	(New Zealand)	Shaun Johnson	New Zealand Warriors	Halfback	
2015	(Australia)	Johnathan Thurston (3)	North Queensland Cowboys	Halfback	
2016	(Australia)	Cooper Cronk	Melbourne Storm	Halfback	
2017	(Australia)	Cameron Smith (2)	Melbourne Storm	Hooker	
IRL Golden Boot
2018	(England)	Tommy Makinson	St Helens	Wing	
2019	(New Zealand)	Roger Tuivasa-Sheck	New Zealand Warriors	Fullback	
2020–21	No award given due to the COVID-19 pandemic				
2022	(New Zealand)	Joseph Manu	Sydney Roosters	Fullback	
2023	(New Zealand)	James Fisher-Harris	Penrith Panthers	Prop	
2024	(Australia)	Isaah Yeo	Penrith Panthers	Lock	
2025	(Australia)	Harry Grant	Melbourne Storm	Hooker	
2026	(New Zealand)	Kalyn Ponga	Newcastle Knights	Fullback	
Additional references:

=== By nationality ===
Wins	Nationality
21	Australia
8	New Zealand
5	England

=== By position ===
Wins	Position
9	Five-eighth/Stand-off
8	Halfback/Scrum-half
6	Fullback
3	Hooker
2	Centre
2	Lock/Loose forward
1	Prop
1	Second-row
1	Wing

=== By club ===
NOTE: Clubs shared the award in 1984, 1985 and 1988

Wins	Club	Years
6	(Australia) Melbourne Storm	2007, 2008, 2009, 2016, 2017, 2025
4	(Australia) Sydney Roosters	1987, 2000, 2005, 2022
3	New Zealand Warriors	2002, 2014, 2019
3	(Australia) North Queensland Cowboys	2011, 2013, 2015
3	(England) Wigan Warriors	1985, 1988, 2004
2	(Australia) Balmain Tigers	1986, 1988
2	(Australia) Brisbane Broncos	2003, 2006
2	(England) Leeds Rhinos	1990, 2012
2	(Australia) Newcastle Knights	1999, 2001, 2026
2	(Australia) Parramatta Eels	1985, 1987
2	(Australia) Penrith Panthers	2023, 2024
1	(Australia) Canberra Raiders	1989
1	(England) St Helens	2018
1	(England) Wakefield Trinity	1984
1	(Australia) Wests Tigers	2010
1	(Australia) Wynnum Manly Seagulls	1984

=== Multiple winners ===
Number	Player	Years	Nationality
3	Johnathan Thurston	2011, 2013, 2015	Australia
2	Andrew Johns	1999, 2001	Australia
2	Darren Lockyer	2003, 2006	Australia
2	Cameron Smith	2007, 2017	Australia

== Winners - Women ==
Year	Nat.	Player	Club(s)	Position	Ref.
2018	(Australia)	Isabelle Kelly	Sydney Roosters	Centre	
2019	(Australia)	Jessica Sergis	St. George Illawarra Dragons	Centre	
2020–21	No award given due to the COVID-19 pandemic				
2022	(New Zealand)	Raecene McGregor	Sydney Roosters	Halfback	
2023	(New Zealand)	Georgia Hale	Gold Coast Titans	Lock	
2024	(Australia)	Tarryn Aiken	Sydney Roosters	Five-eighth	
2025	Australia	Julia Robinson	Brisbane Broncos	Wing, Centre	
2026	(New Zealand)	Stacey Waaka	New Zealand Warriors	Centre, Wing	
Additional references:

=== By nationality ===
Wins	Nationality
4	Australia
3	New Zealand

=== By position ===
Wins	Position
3	Centre
1	Halfback
1	Lock
1	Five-eighth
1	Wing

=== By club ===
Wins	Club	Years
3	(Australia) Sydney Roosters	2018, 2022, 2024
1	(Australia) Gold Coast Titans	2023
1	(Australia) St. George Illawarra Dragons	2019
1	(Australia) Brisbane Broncos	2025
1	New Zealand Warriors	2026

== Winners - Wheelchair ==
Year	Nat.	Player	Club(s)	Ref.
2019	(England)	Jack Brown	Halifax	
2020–21	No award given due to the COVID-19 pandemic			
2022	(England)	Seb Bechara	Catalans Dragons	
2023	(France)	Jérémy Bourson	Catalans Dragons	
2024	(England)	Rob Hawkins	Halifax	
2025	(England)	Rob Hawkins	Halifax	
2026	(England)	Rob Hawkins	Halifax	
Additional references:

=== By nationality ===
Wins	Nationality
5	England
1	France

=== By club ===
Wins	Club	Years
4	(England) Halifax	2019, 2024, 2025, 2026
2	(France) Catalans Dragons	2022, 2023

== See also ==
- International Rugby League
- RLIF Awards
- Rugby League World
