= 2017 Wheelchair Rugby League World Cup =

- Number of teams: 7
- Host country: France
- Winner: France (2nd title)
- Runner-up: England
- Top scorer: (England) Nathan Collins (82)
- Top try scorer: (England) Jack Brown (15)

The 2017 Wheelchair Rugby League World Cup was the third staging of the Wheelchair Rugby League World Cup. The tournament was held from 20 July to 28 July 2017 and was originally planned to be held in Sydney, Australia, as part of the 2017 Festival of World Cups but was relocated to France. The tournament was won by France who defeated England 38–34 in the final in Perpignan to retain the title.

== Host selection and funding concerns ==
On 19 February 2014, it was announced that the joint bid from Australia and New Zealand had won hosting rights for the 2017 Rugby League World Cup to be held in November 2017. As with previous tournaments the Festival of World Cups served as part of the build-up to the main competition and was expected to include the wheelchair competition. In May 2016, the World Cup organising committee raised concerns over financial support for the festival, but by September the England team still anticipated that the wheelchair event would take place in Sydney, Australia. All the teams were European apart from the hosts and holding the tournament in Australia came to be considered financially unviable. In November 2016, the RLIF announced that the wheelchair tournament would be held in France in order to maximise the number of teams taking part. The cost of travel was an issue for participating nations and in the Welsh Parliament it was noted that Wales were dependent on sponsorship and donations in order to take part. In March 2017, the Australian team received A$50,000 from the NRL towards their transport costs.

In April 2017, the French Rugby League Federation announced that the tournament would take place between 20 July and 28 July with the final being played at the Parc des Expositions in Perpignan.

== Venues ==
World Cup venues in the Occitania region in southern France

The venues for the tournament were all in the Occitania region in southern France:

- Limoux - Gymnase L'Olympie (pre-tournament)
- Albi – Gymnase du Cosec
- Carcassonne – Halle aux Sport
- Pamiers – Complexe La Rijole
- Perpignan – Parc des Expositions (final)
- Saint-Jory – Gymnase du Lac
- Saint-Orens – Gymnase du Cosec
- Toulouse – Gymnase Compans Cafferlli

== Teams ==
The seven teams that took part in the tournament were the four semi-finalists from 2013 (Australia, England, France and Wales) who were placed in Group A and Italy, Scotland and Spain in Group B. Ireland had also intended to take part. Each nation was allowed to name up to 12 players in their squad for the tournament.

=== Group A squads ===
Australia

- Peter Arbuckle (QLD)
- Jason Attard (NSW)
- Davin Bretherton (QLD)
- Craig Cannane (NSW)
- Fabian Castillo (NSW)
- William Derederenalagi (NSW)
- Brad Grove (NSW)
- Brett Henman (NSW)
- Diab Karim (NSW)
- Stephan Rochecouste (NSW)
- Yara Ryan (NSW)
- Mitchel Stone (NSW)

England

- Adam Barnett (Medway Dragons)
- Seb Bechara (Catalan Dragons)
- Jodie Boyd-Ward (Leeds Rhinos)
- Wayne Boardman (Halifax)
- Harry Brown (Halifax)
- Jack Brown (Halifax)
- Nathan Collins (Leeds Rhinos)
- Joe Coyd (Medway Dragons)
- Tom Halliwell (Leeds Rhinos)
- Martin Lane (Medway Dragons)
- Ryan Richardson (Leeds Rhinos)
- James Simpson (Leeds Rhinos)

France

- Mouss Abbassi (Toulouse-St Jory)
- Lionel Alazard (Toulouse-St Jory)
- Gilles Clausells (Catalans Dragons)
- Nicolas Clausells (Catalans Dragons)
- Dany Denuwelaere (Toulouse-St Jory)
- Laurent Despues (Catalans Dragons)
- Mickaël Gaune (Roanne Bisons)
- Guillaume Mautz (SO Avignon)
- Kevin Pastor (SO Avignon)
- Michel Penella (Aingirak Euskadi)
- Fabien Plaza (Toulouse-St Jory)
- Cyril Torres (Toulouse-St Jory)

Wales

- Alan Caron (North Wales Crusaders)
- Claire Cranston (North Wales Crusaders)
- John Doyle (North Wales Crusaders)
- Andrew Higgins (North Wales Crusaders)
- Harry Jones (North Wales Crusaders)
- Gary Preece (Hereford Harriers)
- Gary Taylor (North Wales Crusaders)
- Mark Williams (North Wales Crusaders)
- Stuart Williams (North Wales Crusaders)

=== Group B squads ===
Italy

- Quentin Barat (Oyonnax)
- Laurent Blacszack-Ferrari (Carcassonne)
- _ Filice
- Pascal Guigou (Apt)
- Florian Guttadoro (SO Avignon)
- Adam Howarth
- _ Lodico
- Julien Penella (Anglet)
- Marc Verdi (SO Avignon)

Scotland

- Jay Anderson (Dundee Dragons)
- David Birtles (Dundee Dragons)
- Connor Blackmore (Strathmore Silverbacks)
- Gavin Dobson (Halifax)
- Michael Mellon (Dundee Dragons)
- Ronnie Robb (Dundee Dragons)
- Graeme Stewart (Dundee Dragons)

Spain

- Théo Gonzalez (Roanne Bisons)
- Angelo Hernandez (Oyonnax)
- Joël Lacombe (Catalans Dragons)
- Raphaël Monedero (Catalans Dragons)
- Oscar Ourubia

== Warm-up matches ==
Two pre-tournament matches took place on 18 July at the Gymnase L'Olympie, Limoux.

18 July 2017

Italy	32–30	Spain

Gymnase L'Olympie, Limoux

18 July 2017

France	70–16	Australia

Gymnase L'Olympie, Limoux

== Group stage ==
=== Group A ===
Group A
Pos	Team	Pld	W	D	L	PF	PA	PD	Pts	Qualification
1	France	3	3	0	0	291	63	+228	6	Semi-finals
2	England	3	2	0	1	189	129	+60	4	Semi-finals
3	Australia	3	1	0	2	120	206	−86	2	Group play-off
4	Wales	3	0	0	3	66	268	−202	0	Group play-off

20 July 2017

Australia
Tries:
- Attard
- Cannane
- Grove (4)
- Rouchecouste (3)
- Derederenalagi (2)
Goals:
- Castillo (4)
- Henman (4)
- Karim (6)

72–24
Report

Wales
Tries:
- Higgins
- Jones
- Preece
- M Williams
Goals: Higgins (2)

Halle aux Sport, Carcassonne

20 July 2017

France
Tries:
- Torres
- G Clausells
- Alazard (2)
- Denuwelaere (5)
- Plaza
- Despues (2)
Goals:
- Torres (5)
- Plaza (6)
Drop goals: Gaunes

71–31
Report

England
Tries:
- Brown (2)
- Collins (3)
Goals:
- Collins (4)
- Boardman
Drop goals: Brown

Halle aux Sport, Carcassonne

22 July 2017

France
Tries:
- Abassi (3)
- Denuwaelere (3)
- N Clausells (2)
- Plaza
- ?
Goals: ?

102–22
Report

Australia
Tries: ?
Goals: ?

Complexe La Rijole, Pamiers

22 July 2017

Wales
Tries:
- Higgins
- S Williams (3)
- M Williams
Goals: Higgins (6)

32–78
Report

England
Tries:
- Collins (2)
- J Brown (3)
- Bechara (3)
- Boyd-Ward
- Boardman (3)
- Halliwell
- Richardson
- Coyd
Goals:
- Collins (3)
- Boardman (6)

Complexe La Rijole, Pamiers

24 July 2017

France
Tries:
- Abassi (4)
- Alazard
- N Clausells (3)
- Despues (4)
- Gaune
- Mautz
- Pastor (3)
- Torres (3)
Goals:
- Torres (15)
- Gaune

118–10
Report

Wales
Tries:
- Higgins
- S Williams
Goals: Higgins

Gymnase du Lac, St-Jory

24 July 2017

England
Tries:
- Coyd
- Lane (2)
- Richardson (3)
- Collins (6)
- ?
Goals: Collins (10)

80–26
Report

Australia
Tries:
- Attard
- Karim
- ?
Goals: ?

Gymnase du Lac, St-Jory

=== Group B ===
Group B
Pos	Team	Pld	W	D	L	PF	PA	PD	Pts	Qualification
1	Italy	2	2	0	0	178	45	+133	4	Group play-off
2	Spain	2	1	0	1	93	86	+7	2	Group play-off
3	Scotland	2	0	0	2	24	164	−140	0	

20 July 2017

Scotland	6–110	Italy
Tries: Mellon 55'; Goals: Mellon	Report	Tries: ? Goals: ?

Halle aux Sport, Carcassonne

22 July 2017

Spain	39–68	Italy

Complexe La Rijole, Pamiers

24 July 2017

Scotland	18–54	Spain

Gymnase du Lac, St-Jory

== Knockout stage ==
In the knockout stage the top two teams in Group A qualified for the semi-finals. The other semi-finalists were determined by play-offs between the remaining Group A teams and the top two teams in Group B.

Group play-offs
Italy	105
Wales	24
Australia	49
Spain	40

Semi-finals
France	98
Italy	6
England	76
Australia	36
5th/6th play-off
Wales	66
Spain	45

Final
France	38
England	34
3rd/4th play-off
Australia	58
Italy	45

=== Group play-offs ===
The group play-offs were held on 25 July at the Gymnase du Cosec, Albi.

25 July 2017

Australia	49–40	Spain

Gymnase du Cosec, Albi

25 July 2017

Italy
Tries: ?
Goals: ?
Drop goals: ?

105–24
Report

Wales
Tries:
- Caron
- Cranston
- Higgins
- S Williams
- Preece
Goals: Higgins (2)

Gymnase du Cosec, Albi

=== Semi-finals ===
Both semi-finals were played on 26 July at the Gymnase Compans Cafferlli, Toulouse.

25 July 2017

England
Tries:
- Collins (2)
- J Brown (6)
- Lane
- Coyd (2)
- Bechara (2)
Goals:
- Collins (2)
- Boardman (10)
- J Brown

76–36
Report

Australia
Tries: ?
Goals: ?

Gymnase Compans Cafferlli, Toulouse

25 July 2017

France
Tries:
- Torres (2)
- G Clausells (2)
- Denawulaere (2)
- Penella
- N Clausells (3)
- Abassi (3)
- Despues (2)
- Gaune (2)
Goals:
- Torres (9)
- Guane (6)

98–6
Report

Italy
Tries: Caparossito
Goals: ?

Gymnase Compans Cafferlli, Toulouse

=== Minor finals ===
The matches to decide 3rd to 6th placed teams were played on 27 July at the Gymnase du Cosec, Saint-Orens.

5th/6th play-off

27 July 2017

Wales
Tries:
- Caron (2)
- Cranston (2)
- Higgins (2)
- S Williams (4)
- Preece (2)
Goals: Higgins (9)

66–45
Report

Spain
Tries: ?
Goals: ?
Drop goals: ?

Gymnase du Cosec, St-Orens

3rd/4th play-off

27 July 2017

Australia	58–45	Italy
	Report

Gymnase du Cosec, St-Orens

=== Final ===
The final was played on 28 July at the Parc des Expositions in Perpignan.

Final

28 July 2017

France
Tries:
- N. Clausells (3) 25', 72', 76'
- Denuwelaere (2) 33', 51'
- Plaza (2) 53', 55'
Goals:
- Plaza (3)
- Torres (2)

38–34
Report

England
Tries:
- Bechara 6'
- J. Brown (3) 41', 44', 61'
- Boardman 59'
Goals: Boardman (7)

Parc des Expositions, Perpignan
Attendance: 2,500

== Rankings ==
Final tournament rankings:

1. France
2. England
3. Australia
4. Italy
5. Wales
6. Spain
7. Scotland

== Top ten players ==
At the end of the tournament the top 10 players were selected: Gilles Clausells was named as the Best Player of the World Cup.

1. Gilles Clausells – France
2. William Derederenalagi – Australia
3. Dany Denulawere – France
4. Mickael Gaunes – France
5. Oscar Ourubia – Spain
6. Jack Brown – England
7. Nathan Collins – England
8. Lionel Alazard – France
9. Seb Bechara – England
10. Adam Howarth – Italy

== Broadcasting ==
Confronted with limited media coverage of the tournament the French Rugby League Federation created a YouTube channel through which matches were broadcast.
