= 2013 Wheelchair Rugby League World Cup =

- Number of teams: 6
- Host country: England
- Winner: France (1st title)
- Runner-up: England
- Matches played: 14
- Top scorer: (Wales) Paul Craig (68)
- Top try scorers: (England) Jack Brown (11) (England) Harry Brown (11)

The 2013 Wheelchair Rugby League World Cup was the second staging of the Wheelchair Rugby League World Cup. The tournament was held from 3 July to 13 July 2013 in Gillingham, Kent, England, as part of the 2013 Festival of World Cups. The tournament was won by France who defeated the defending champions, England, 42–40 in the final at the Medway Park Sports Centre to win their first title. Dany Denuwelaere of France was named as the player of the tournament.

== Host and venue ==
World Cup venue in England

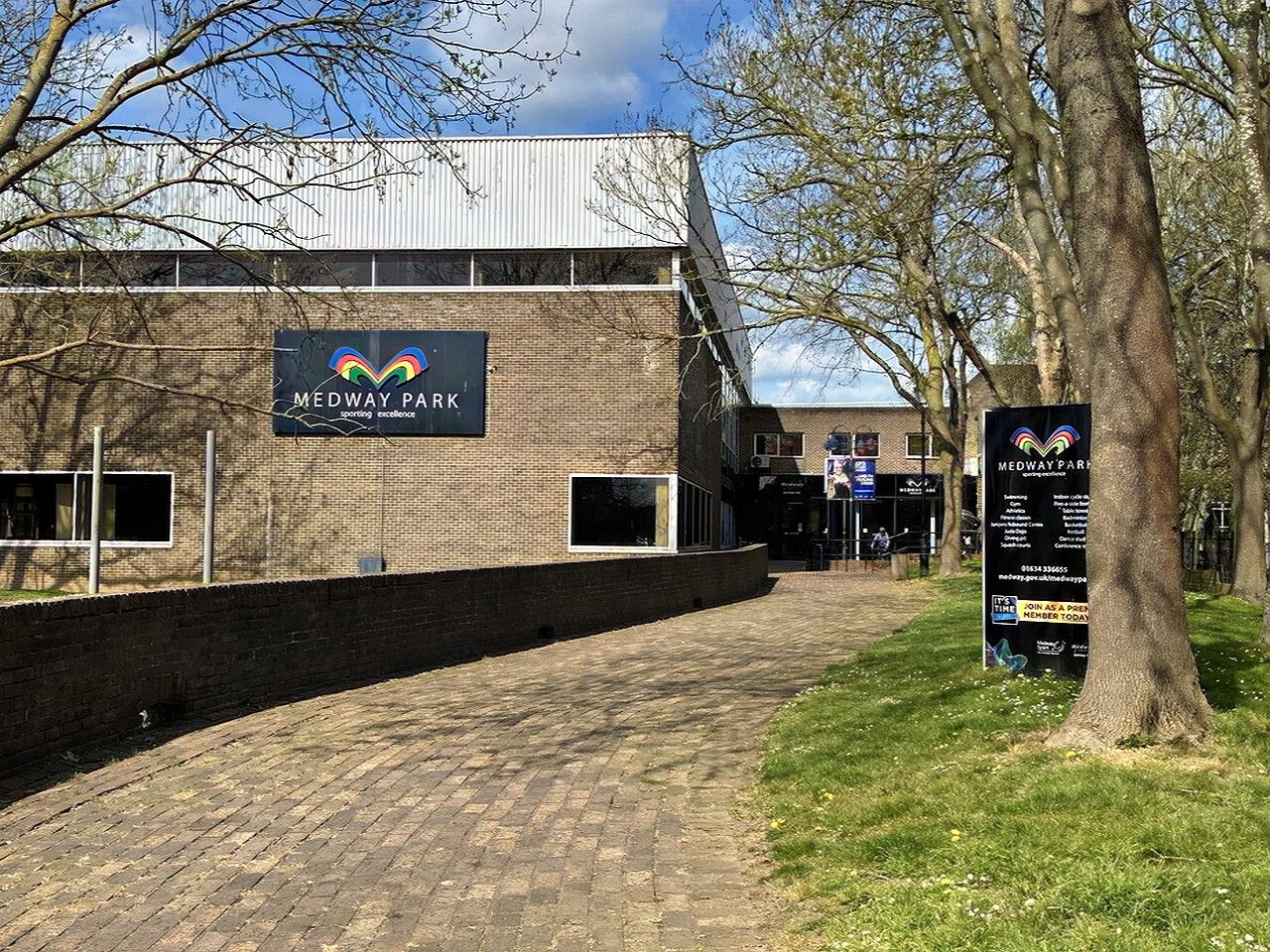
Medway Park Sports Centre

In July 2009, it was announced that the 2013 Rugby League World Cup would be held in the United Kingdom. (Note: It was revealed in November 2011, that in addition to England and Wales there would also be matches played in Ireland and France.) The 2013 World Cup took place in October and November with the 2013 Festival of World Cups being held in July as part of the build-up to the main tournament. This was played at several venues in England and included world cups for armed forces, police, students, women, and wheelchair rugby league.

The venue for the wheelchair competition, Medway Park Sports Centre in Gillingham, was built in the 1970s, but was part of a larger sports complex that had officially reopened in July 2011 following a £11 million redevelopment. It had hosted inaugural Fassolette-Kielty Trophy match between England and France in August 2012, with an estimated attendance of 700, though the venue was reported to have a capacity of only 500. The world cup was part of the Medway Festival of Sport which included more than 50 events taking place over a three-month period.

== Teams ==
A year before the tournament took place the teams had not been confirmed, but it was suggested that it "would include teams from Ireland, Scotland, Wales, New Zealand, Australia, England, France and, most surprisingly, Malta". (Note: Ireland, Scotland and Wales all launched their national teams in 2012. Malta had not played any representative matches, but had a wheelchair rugby league championship played in a Merit League format. New Zealand had been expected to compete at the 2008 World Cup, but withdrew before the tournament.) In February 2013, when the launch event for the Festival of World Cups took place, it was reported that five teams would take part in the wheelchair tournament. A week later, when Australia first announced their squad, they listed six teams taking part: Australia, England, France, Malta, Scotland and Wales. By April, when the draw for the competition was made, the six teams taking part included Ireland instead of Malta.

=== Squads ===
Group A

- Australia: Coach: Steve Hewson

Jason Attard
Tano Bagnato
Rhys Baxter
Daniel Begman
Craig Cannane
Fabian Castillo
Rich Engles
Brad Grove
Diab Karim
Yarra Ryan
Mitch Stone
Jason Voncina

- France: Coach: Sylvain Crismanovic

Lionel Alazard
Jérôme Bonnet (Note: Bonnet was called up as a replacement for Cyril Torres who was injured during the warm-up match against Australia, however, Torres played in the final.)
Gilles Clausells
Nicolas Clausells
Dany Denuwelaere
Jean-Yves Ducos
Mickaël Gaune
Nicolas Massat
Manuel Morais
Fabien Plaza
Cyril Torres

- Scotland

John Cairns
Chris Calderwood
Elizabeth Ferris
Sean Frame
Adam Mould
Kieron Mullen
Thomas Pincock
Joey Probst
Tom Sheridan
Graeme Stewart

Group B

- England: Coach: Mark Roughsedge

Harry Brown
Jack Brown
Joe Coyd
Chris Greenhalgh
Jack Heggie
Ian Kenny
Martin Norris
Adam Rigby
Phil Roberts
Gina Smallwood
Mike Stevenson
Andy Wharton

- Ireland

Jodie Boyd-Ward
Tom Byrnes
Nathan Clarke
Josh Gardner
Rachael Irwin
Vicky Irwin
Damian McCabe
John Maguire

- Wales

Alan Caron
Paul Craig
Chris Dennett
Jonathan Dunn
Joshua Dunn
George Hill
Martin Lane
Michael Knight
Michael Porter
Scott Turner

== Warm-up matches ==
A pre-tournament match took place between France and Australia on 29 June in Nanterre.

29 June 2013

France	102–12	Australia

Centre Sportif du Mont-Valérien, Nanterre

== Group stage ==
The teams were divided into two groups and each played three matches in the group stage: one against each of the two teams in their group and one against a team from the other group. The top two in each group progressed to the semi-finals.

=== Tables ===
Group A
Pos	Team	Pld	W	D	L	PF	PA	PD	Pts	Qualification
1	France	3	3	0	0	254	28	+226	6	Semi-finals
2	Australia	3	1	0	2	170	97	+73	2	Semi-finals
3	Scotland	3	0	0	3	4	328	−324	0	

Group B
Pos	Team	Pld	W	D	L	PF	PA	PD	Pts	Qualification
1	England	3	2	0	1	156	42	+114	4	Semi-finals
2	Wales	3	2	0	1	135	72	+63	4	Semi-finals
3	Ireland	3	1	0	2	40	192	−152	2	

=== Results ===
Group A

3 July 2013

Australia	148–0	Scotland
Tries: Attard (8), Engles (5), Stone (3), Voncina (2), Ryan (2), Groves (3), Begnato, Castillo (2); Goals: Engles (8), Ryan, Bagnato (13)	ERL

Medway Park, Gillingham
Player of the Match: Rick Engles (AUS)

Group B

3 July 2013

Wales	104–6	Ireland
Tries: Dennett (5), Lane (3), Knight (4), Craig (2), Hill (2), Turner (3); Goals: Craig (13/19)	ERL	Goals: Clarke (3/3)

Medway Park, Gillingham

Inter-group

3 July 2013

England	20–28	France
Tries: Jack Brown (2), Wharton, Greenhalgh; Goals: Heggie (2/5)	ERL	Tries: Nicolas Claussells (2), Dany Delawaere, Gilles Claussells; Goals: Guane (1/1), Plaza (5/5)

Medway Park, Gillingham

Group A

6 July 2013

France	154–2	Scotland
Tries: Alazard (6), Massatt (4), Morais (4), Bonnet (4), Ducos (5), Denwelaere (2), Gilles Clausells; Goals: Plaza (8), Gilles Clausells (11), Denweleare (2), Morais (4)	ERL	Goals: Stewart

Medway Park, Gillingham

Group B

6 July 2013

England	86–8	Ireland
Tries: Coyd (6), Wharton, Heggie (2), Kenny, Stevenson (4), Greenhalgh (2); Goals: Rigby (9), Stevenson (2)	ERL	Goals: Clarke (4)

Medway Park, Gillingham

Inter-group

6 July 2013

Wales	25–16	Australia
Tries: Jon Dunn (3), Knight; Goals: Craig (4); Drop goals: Knight	ERL	Tries: Begman, Engles, Attard; Goals: Engles, Begnato

Medway Park, Gillingham
Referee: Richard Johnson

Group A

9 July 2013

France	72–6	Australia
Tries: Denwelaere (3), Nicolas Claussells (5), Guane (2), Gilles Claussells (2), Plaza; Goals: Guane (2), Plaza (7), Gilles Claussells	ERL	Tries: Attard; Goals: Engles

Medway Park, Gillingham

Group B

9 July 2013

Wales	6–50	England
Tries: Craig; Goals: Craig	ERL	Tries: Greenhalgh, Jack Brown (6), Heggie (2); Goals: Heggie (6), Stevenson

Medway Park, Gillingham

Inter-group

9 July 2013

Ireland	26–6	Scotland
Tries: McCabe, Vicky Irwin, Gardner, Boyd-Ward; Goals: Clarke (5)	ERL	Tries: Probst; Goals: Stewart

Medway Park, Gillingham

== Knockout stage ==
Semi-finals
France	71
Wales	30
England	81
Australia	10
5th/6th play-off
Ireland	36
Scotland	14

Final
France	42
England	40
3rd/4th play-off
Australia	14
Wales	16

=== Semi-finals ===
11 July 2013

France	71–30	Wales
Tries: Alazard (2), Nicolas Claussells (2), Denwulaere, Plaza, Gilles Claussells (2), Ducos, Bonnet (2), Gaune; Goals: Gaune (5), Plaza (6); Drop goals: Gaune	ERL	Tries: Turner (3), Dennett, Craig; Goals: Craig (5)

Medway Park, Gillingham

11 July 2013

England	81–10	Australia
Tries: Jack Brown (2), Wharton, Heggie (2), Greenhalgh, Harry Brown (7), Stevenson, Rigby; Goals: Heggie (7), Stevenson (2), Rigby; Drop goals: Harry Bown	ERL	Tries: Begman, Castillo; Goals: Engles

Medway Park, Gillingham

=== Minor finals ===
5th/6th play-off

13 July 2013

Ireland	36–14	Scotland
Tries: McCabe (3), Boyd-Ward (2), Vicky Irwin, Burns; Goals: Clarke (3), Gardner	ERL	Tries: Frame (2), Probst; Goals: Cairns

Medway Park, Gillingham

3rd/4th play-off

13 July 2013

Australia	14–16	Wales
Tries: Engles; Goals: Engles (4), Voncina	ERL	Tries: Jonathan Dunn, Dennett, Turner; Goals: Craig (2)

Medway Park, Gillingham

=== Final ===
Final

13 July 2013

England	40–42	France
Tries: Heggie, Greenhalgh (2), Harry Brown (4), Jack Brown; Goals: Heggie (4)	ERL	Tries: Denuwelaere (2), Gilles Claussells (3), Torres, Plaza; Goals: Torres (7), Gilles Claussells

Medway Park, Gillingham
Referee: Richard Frileux (France), Rhett Johnson (England)

== Rankings ==
1. France
2. England
3. Wales
4. Australia
5. Ireland
6. Scotland
