= Elizabeth Ferris (wheelchair rugby) =

Scottish wheelchair rugby player

Elizabeth O. V. Ferris
Personal information
- Born: c. 1986

Playing information
Representative
Years	Team	Pld	T	G	FG	P
2013–15	Scotland	11

Elizabeth O. V. Ferris BEM (born c. 1986) is a former Scotland Wheelchair Rugby League international and medical doctor. She is the founder of Dundee Dragons Wheelchair Sports Club SCIO in Dundee, Scotland.

== Background ==
Ferris was born in Northern Ireland She attended Rainey Endowed School, Magherafelt and after leaving in 2003 went on to study medicine at the University of Dundee. A spinal cord injury during her studies rendered her paralyzed from the waist down. She was the first full-time wheelchair user to graduate from the University of Dundee School of Medicine

== Rugby League career ==
During rehabilitation after her spinal injury Ferris was introduced to the sport of wheelchair rugby league She was selected to represent Scotland at the 2013 Wheelchair Rugby League World Cup and has served as both Manager and Chair of Scotland Wheelchair Rugby League

She founded the Dundee Dragons Wheelchair Sports Club in 2013 as there were no facilities in Tayside for team based wheelchair sport.

== Honours ==
- Recipient of the Dundee City Disability Sport Jenny Wood-Allen Award in 2014
- Appointed Ambassador for Spinal Injuries Scotland
- Honorary Fellowship from Abertay University, Dundee in 2017
- Awarded the University of Dundee's Wimberley Award upon graduating from her medical degree.
- In 2020 Ferris was awarded the British Empire Medal in the 2020 Queen's Birthday Honours for services to Disability Sport in Scotland.
- In 2021 Ferris was named as one of Britain's 100 Most Influential Disabled People with her inclusion in the Shaw Trust Disability Power 100 List.
