= Fassolette-Kielty Trophy =

- Sport: Wheelchair rugby league
- Instituted: 2012
- Number of teams: 2
- Countries: England; France
- Holders: France
- Wins: France (7 titles); England (5 titles)

The Fassolette-Kielty Trophy is a trophy awarded in wheelchair rugby league. Inaugurated in 2012, the trophy is competed for between the national teams of England and France. The trophy is not awarded when the two countries meet in the World Cup or another international trophy. The current holders are France who won the most recent encounter on 23 November 2024.

The trophy is named after Frenchman Robert Fassolette and Englishman Malcolm Kielty, both of whom were pioneers in the development of wheelchair rugby league.

== Results ==
Fassolette-Kielty Trophy results
| Date | Venue | Home team | Score | Away team | Holders | Ref. |
|---|---|---|---|---|---|---|
| 27 August 2012 | Medway Park, Gillingham | England | 22–43 | France | France | |
| 14 May 2014 | Kindarena, Rouen | France | 64–46 | England | France | |
| 23 September 2015 | Medway Park, Gillingham | England | 56–26 | France | England | |
| 21 June 2019 | Gymnase M. Guigou, Apt | France | 25–31 | England | England | |
| 23 June 2019 | Palais des Sports de Toulon | France | 50–46 | England | France | |
| 10 November 2021 | Medway Park, Gillingham | England | 24–49 | France | France | |
| 13 November 2021 | Medway Park, Gillingham | England | 26–39 | France | France | |
| 19 June 2022 | National Basketball Centre, Manchester | England | 62–48 | France | England | |
| 5 November 2023 | Leeds Arena, Leeds | England | 34–43 | France | France | |
| 25 November 2023 | Palais des Sports de Marseille | France | 18–34 | England | England | |
| 26 October 2024 | Robin Park Arena, Wigan | England | 66–33 | France | England | |
| 23 November 2024 | Pole Hippique, St-Lo | France | 32–28 | England | France | |
