= Declan Roberts =

English wheelchair rugby league player

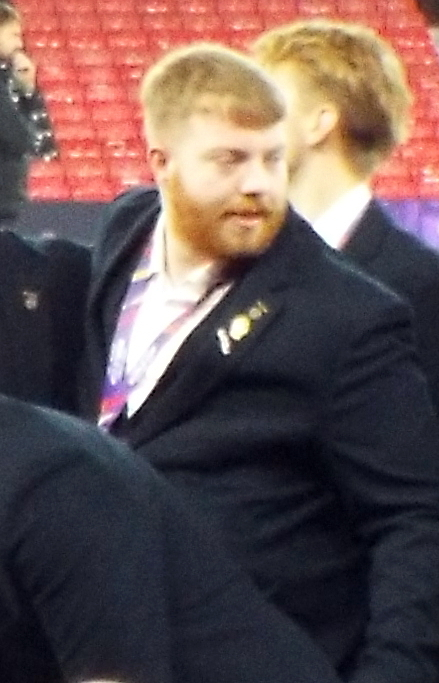

Playing information
Club
Years	Team	Pld	T	G	FG	P
2013–18	Unknown
2018–24	Wigan Warriors
	Total	0	0	0	0	0
Representative
Years	Team	Pld	T	G	FG	P
2021–2024	England	9

Declan Roberts is an English former wheelchair rugby league player who played for Wigan Warriors in RFL Wheelchair Super League and the England national wheelchair rugby league team, having retired from the sport in December 2024.

== Career ==
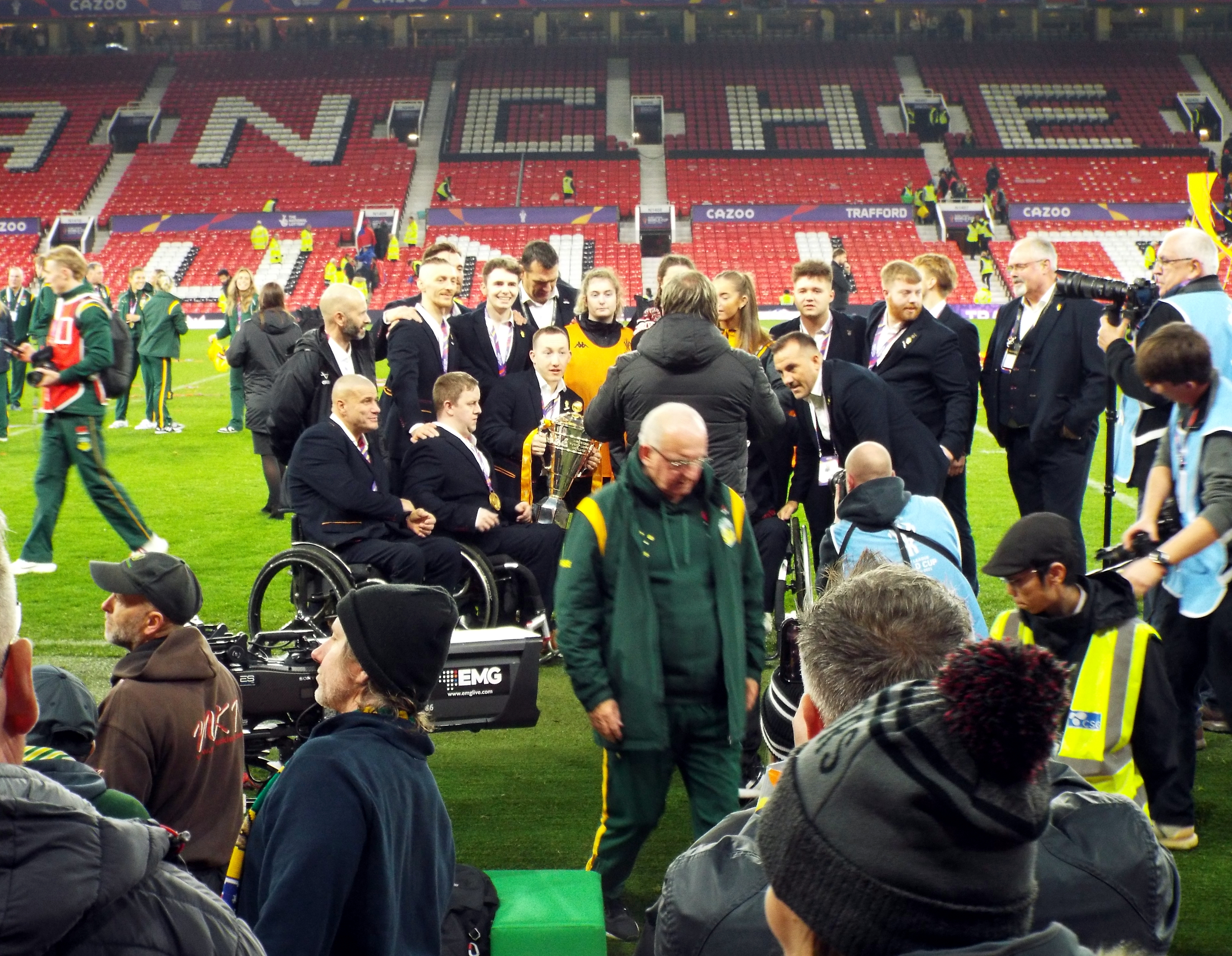
Roberts (back row; far right) with the England national wheelchair rugby league team, celebrating their 2021 World Cup victory at Old Trafford in 2022

=== Club ===
Roberts began playing wheelchair rugby league in 2013, winning the Grand Final a year later. He joined Wigan Warriors in the years of the creation of the club's wheelchair team in 2018. Roberts was a key player for Wigan's victory in the 2023 Super League Grand Final, scoring two tries and kicking seven goals.

=== International ===
Roberts made his England debut in the 2021 mid-season defeats against France. He played was selected for England's 2021 Wheelchair Rugby League World Cup campaign. England finished the tournament as champions, beating France 28–24.

== Personal life ==
Roberts is the son of Ireland international, Phil Roberts.

== Honours ==
=== Wigan ===
- Super League:
  - Champions (1): 2023

=== England ===
- World Cup:
  - Champions (1): 2021
