= Jack Brown (wheelchair rugby league) =

English wheelchair rugby league player

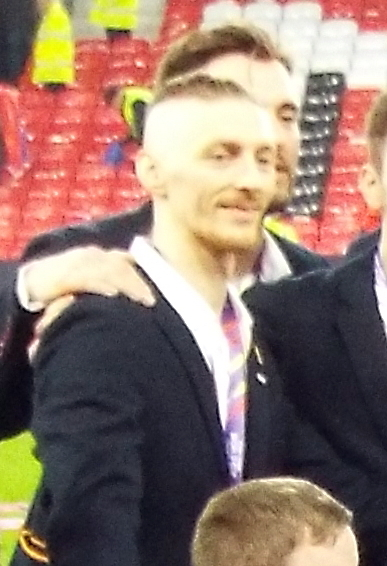

Personal information
- Born: Halifax, West Yorkshire, England

Playing information
Club
Years	Team	Pld	T	G	FG	P
	Calderdale
–2019	Halifax Panthers
2020–2024	Unknown
2025–	Halifax Panthers
	Total	0	0	0	0	0
Representative
Years	Team	Pld	T	G	FG	P
2005–	England
Medals
Wheelchair rugby league
Representing England
World Cup
Winner	2008 Australia
Runner-up	2013 England
Runner-up	2017 France
Winner	2021 England
Winner	2026 Australia

Jack Brown is an English wheelchair rugby league player born in Halifax, West Yorkshire. He currently plays for Halifax Panthers in the RFL Wheelchair Super League and the England national wheelchair rugby league team.

== Background ==
Jack Brown is an able-bodied wheelchair rugby league player. He was introduced to the sport by his younger brother Harry who began playing aged 11 after losing both his legs to meningitis. He would end up playing multiple club and international games with his brother. Brown hated sport as child, and credits his brother for his career stating "all the amazing things I’ve got to do in rugby, and some in basketball myself – it’s all down to Harry." He was unable to follow his brother into wheelchair basketball (Harry played both sports) as unlike wheelchair rugby league, wheelchair basketball doesn't allow able-bodied athletes to compete at the top level of the sport.

== Career ==
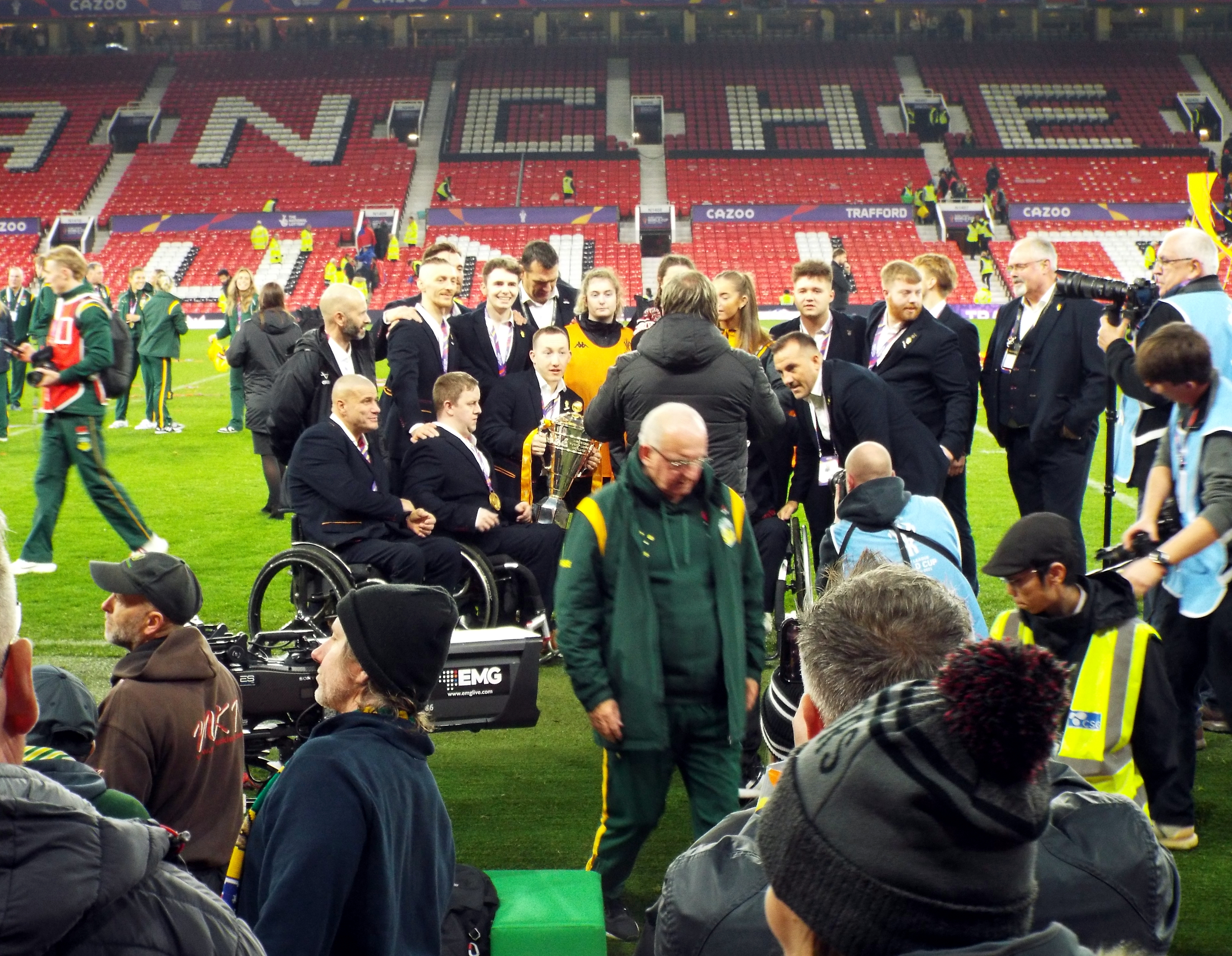
Brown (back row; second left) with the England national wheelchair rugby league team, celebrating their 2021 World Cup victory at Old Trafford in 2022

=== Club ===
Jack Brown played most of his club career at Halifax Panthers and had spent time at Calderdale. He played in both 2015 and 2016 domestic wheelchair finals for Halifax in which the team won both. Brown won the inaugural 2019 Super League title with Halifax. Later that year, he won the inaugural IRL Wheelchair Golden Boot in 2019. In 2020, he moved to Townsville. He was credited with aiding the development of wheelchair rugby league in Australia during his time in Australia. For the 2025 season, Brown returned home to Halifax Panthers, with wanting more game time ahead of the 2026 World Cup with match eligibility being a problem in Australia. In June 2025, Halifax won the Challenge Cup with Brown named as player of the match in the final. Halifax's season continued to deliver with the team winning the League Leaders Shield and Super League Grand Final to complete the treble. Brown scored two tries in the final.

=== International ===
Jack Brown represented England at the inaugural Wheelchair Rugby League World Cup in 2008. England reached the final, beating Australia 44–12 in the final, finishing the tournament as champions. He again represents England at the 2013 tournament. This saw England finish as runners-up, losing to France in the final, with Brown scoring once in the 2013 final. Brown was announced as captain for the 2017 World Cup. His first tournament as captain ended the same as 2013, again losing to France in the final. Brown scored a hat-trick in the 2017 final and finished the tournament as the top try-scorer with 15 tries in total. Brown lost his captaincy for the 2021 tournament to Tom Halliwell. Despite this, Brown has an outstanding tournament. He scored eight tries in England's semi-final in a 125–22 victory against Wales. In the final, England reclaimed the World title, with Brown scoring twice, beating France 28–24. Brown made team of the tournament and, with France's Mostefa Abbasi, was the joint top try-scorer with 17 tries. In 2023, Brown played in England's double header against France, losing the home leg but winning away having also scored in the second game. Brown returned to a leadership position with the England squad ahead of the 2025 Wheelchair Ashes, being awarded the vice-captaincy.

=== Coaching ===
While in Australia, Brown was part of the Queensland state team coaching set up, and aided them in four back to back victories in the Wheelchair State Challenge between 2021 and 2024.

== Personal life ==
Brown worked as a welder for a mining company while in Australia.

== Honours ==
=== Halifax ===
- Super League (and predecessor tournaments):
  - Champions (4): 2015, 2016, 2019
- Challenge Cup:
  - Champions (5): 2015, 2016, 2017, 2018, 2025

=== England ===
- World Cup:
  - Champions (3): 2008, 2021, 2026
  - Runner-up (2): 2013, 2017

=== Individual ===
- IRL Wheelchair Golden Boot
  - Winners (1): 2019
