= Wheelchair Challenge Cup =

Wheelchair rugby league competition

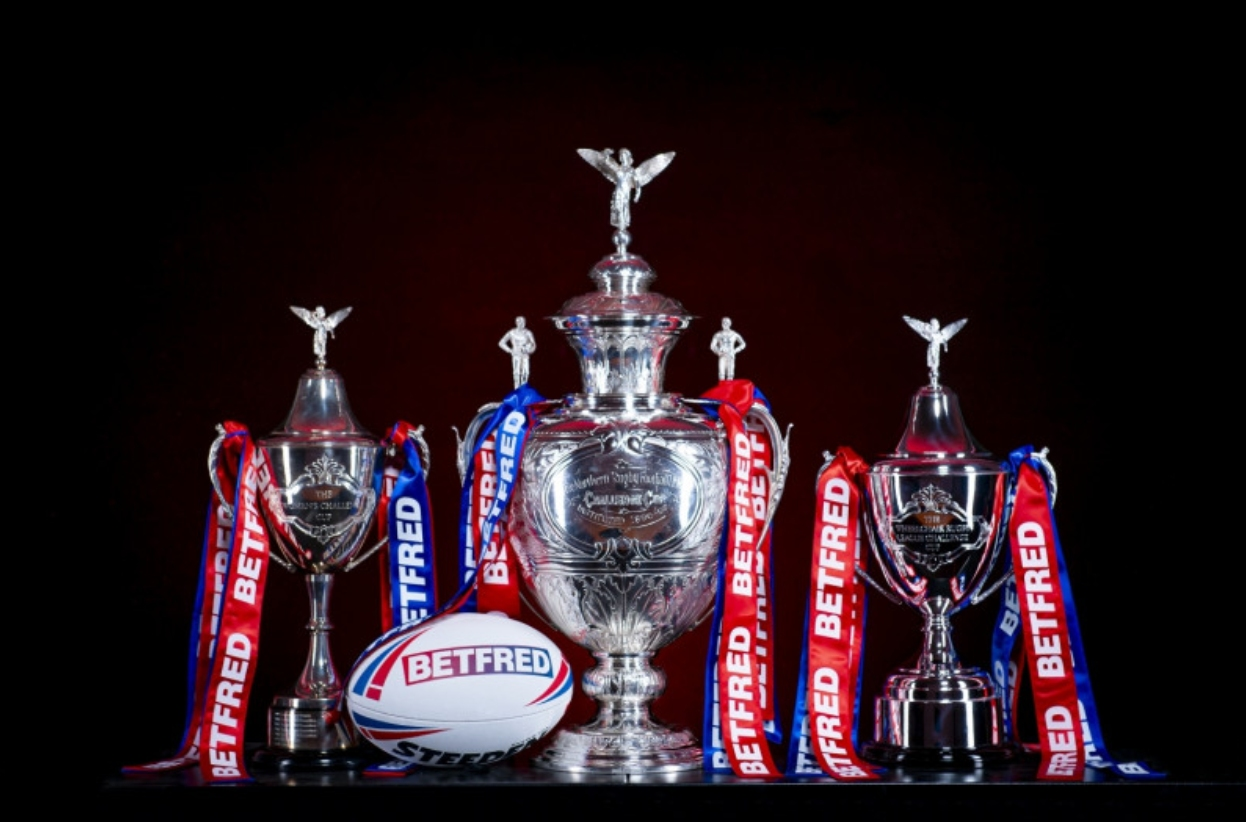
- The women's, men's, and wheelchair Challenge Cup trophies
- Sport: Wheelchair rugby league
- Instituted: 2015
- Inaugural season: 2015
- Country: England; France; Scotland; Wales
- Winners: Halifax Panthers (2026)
- Most titles: Halifax Panthers (6 titles)
- Broadcast partner: BBC Red Button (final only)
- Related competition: RFL Wheelchair Super League

The Wheelchair Challenge Cup is a wheelchair rugby league competition organised by the Rugby Football League.

== History ==
The Wheelchair Challenge Cup was established in 2015. Originally the tournament was played using a knockout format. Halifax defeated Medway Dragons 120–40 in the opening round of the 2015 competition and went on to win the final against Mersey Storm before completing the double by winning the league championship. Another double followed for Halifax in 2016 which included a 92–48 win over Leeds Rhinos in the cup final. Leeds had scored over 100 points their previous two rounds but faced a Halifax side who had not lost a match since June 2015. Halifax repeated the double again in the 2017 season with a 110–48 cup final win over Leeds that included 15 tries by Jack Brown. Other notable matches included a 160–0 win for Leeds over Argonauts in the opening round and the first all-Scottish match in the competition between Dundee Dragons and Glasgow Panthers in the quarter-finals.

In 2018, a plate competition was introduced which was intended to reduce the number of one-sided fixtures being played. The two plate finalists qualified for the quarter-finals of the cup though the finals of both competitions were played on the same day. Hereford Harriers defeated North Wales Crusaders for the plate and Halifax won the cup competition for the fourth time by defeating Dundee Dragons 62–18 in the final. In 2019, the plate was replaced by Challenge Trophy played as a separate competition for teams outside of the Super League. Leeds Rhinos won 74–46 against Argonauts to win the cup for the first time.

In the draw for the 2020 cup, which contained only six teams, two were given byes to the semi-final, but following the cancellation of the 2020 competition a new format was introduced in 2021 with the teams playing in a round-robin tournament. The top two teams qualified for the final which was a repeat of the 2019 final with Leeds retaining the title with a 60–26 victory. The following year it was the top four from the round-robin stage that qualified for the semi-finals. French team, Catalans Dragons, made their début in the competition, but lost in the final to Leeds who claimed the cup for the third time. The 2023 competition saw the top two teams advance to the final. Catalans and Leeds were both unbeaten in the qualifiers and drew 4–4 against each other to set up a rematch in the final which Catalans won 66–20 to add the Challenge Cup to their French Championship and Coupe de France titles.

From 2024, the Challenge Cup reverted to a straight knockout format, like the running game, for the five Super League sides, Catalans Dragons, and the Challenge Trophy finalists. Hereford Harriers and Edinburgh Giants, who qualified through the Challenge Trophy, were both knocked out in the quarter-finals. Catalans Dragons retained the title with an 81–18 win over Wigan Warriors in the final. In 2025, the invitation for Catalans Dragons to take part was withdrawn by the Rugby Football League due to a dispute with the French Federation over international fixtures between England and France.

== Results ==
=== 2015 ===
Round One
Halifax	120
Medway Dragons	40

Quarter-finals
Halifax	W
Leyland Warriors	120
Gravesend Dynamite	22

Semi-finals
Halifax	W
Leyland Warriors
Mersey Storm	W
Leeds Rhinos

Final
Halifax	W
Mersey Storm

Sources: (Note: Bracket is based on known results and is therefore incomplete)

=== 2016 ===
Round 1
Gravesend Dynamite	102
Hereford Harriers	32
Bradford Bulls	72
Dundee Dragons	34
Glasgow Panthers	66
Keighley Cougars	18
Folkestone Spitfires	124
Dartford Vipers	4

Quarter-finals
Halifax	24
Gravesend Dynamite	0
Hull F.C.	52
Bradford Bulls	62
Leeds Rhinos	144
Glasgow Panthers	4
Medway Dragons	48
Folkestone Spitfires	26

Semi-finals
Halifax	84
Bradford Bulls	35
Leeds Rhinos	104
Medway Dragons	48

Final
Halifax	92
Leeds Rhinos	48

=== 2017 ===
Quarter-finals
Leyland Warriors	28
Halifax	58
Dundee Dragons	58
Glasgow Panthers	28
Leeds Rhinos	96
Mersey Storm	40
Medway Dragons	46
North Wales Crusaders	36

Semi-finals
Halifax	72
Dundee Dragons	12
Leeds Rhinos	84
Medway Dragons	66

Final
Halifax	18
Leeds Rhinos	62

Sources: (Note: Bracket is shown from the quarter-finals stage as reports giving round one results appear incomplete, but known results included: Dundee Dragons 86–4 Keighley Cougars, Leeds Rhinos 160–0 Argonauts, and Glasgow received a bye)

=== 2018 ===
Quarter-finals
Dundee Dragons	46
Medway Dragons	10
Hereford Harriers	42
St Helens	44
Leyland Warriors	24
Halifax	92
Argonauts
Leeds Rhinos

Semi-finals
Dundee Dragons	24
St Helens	0
Halifax	68
Leeds Rhinos	42

Final
Dundee Dragons	18
Halifax	62

Sources: (Note: Dundee and Hereford qualified for the cup by reaching the final of the plate competition and because Dundee reached the final of the cup their place in the plate final was taken by North Wales Crusaders) (Note: Dundee were awarded a 24-0 win in the semi-final as St Helens forfeited the match)

=== 2019 ===
Round One
30 June
Argonauts	104
St Helens	4
30 June
North Wales Crusaders	64
Hereford Harriers	51

Semi-finals
21 July
Argonauts	78
North Wales Crusaders	27
30 June
Leeds Rhinos	62
Halifax	48

Final
17 August
Leeds Rhinos	74
Argonauts	46

=== 2021 ===
Pos	Team	Pld	W	D	L	PF	PA	PD	Pts	LEE	ARG	HAL	LEY	HUL	NWC
1	Leeds Rhinos	5	5	0	0	124	24	+100	10		16–6	20–12	24–0	30–6	34–0
2	Argonauts	5	3	1	1	84	52	+32	7			6–6	22–6	24–12	26–12
3	Halifax Panthers	5	3	1	1	76	58	+18	7				8–6	24–12	26–14
4	Leyland Warriors	5	1	1	3	57	88	−31	3					16–16	29–18
5	Hull F.C.	5	1	1	3	58	104	−46	3						12–10
6	North Wales Crusaders	5	0	0	5	54	127	−73	0						

Final
1	Leeds Rhinos	60
2	Argonauts	26

=== 2022 ===
Pos	Team	Pld	W	D	L	PF	PA	PD	Pts	LEE	CAT	WIG	HAL	LON	HUL	WAR
1	Leeds Rhinos	6	6	0	0	100	12	+88	12		8–0	8–6	24–6	20–0	18–0	22–0
2	Catalans Dragons	6	5	0	1	162	16	+146	10			20–4	42–0	30–4	30–0	40–0
3	Wigan Warriors	6	4	0	2	97	42	+55	8				11–2	10–6	36–6	30–0
4	Halifax Panthers	6	3	0	3	72	83	−11	6					10–6	36–0	18–0
5	London Roosters	6	2	0	4	46	80	−34	4						10–6	20–4
6	Hull F.C.	6	1	0	5	30	134	−104	2							18–4
7	Warrington Wolves	6	0	0	6	8	148	−140	0							

Semi-finals
1	Leeds Rhinos	36
4	Halifax Panthers	6
2	Catalans Dragons	30
3	Wigan Warriors	6

Final
Leeds Rhinos	48
Catalans Dragons	34

=== 2023 ===
Pos	Team	Pld	W	D	L	Pts	CAT	LEE	HUL	HAL	LON	WAR	WIG
1	Catalans Dragons	6	5	1	0	11		4–4	16–0		1–0		
2	Leeds Rhinos	6	5	1	0	11			12–4				
3	Hull F.C.	6	4	0	2	8				8–4	8–4	12–2	16–0
4	Halifax Panthers	6	—	—	3+	—							
5	London Roosters	6	—	—	3+	—							
6	Warrington Wolves	6	—	—	3+	—							
7	Wigan Warriors	6	—	—	3+	—							

Source: (Note: Catalans and Leeds were joint top and Hull finished third, other teams are listed alphabetically as results given in the report are incomplete)

Final
1	Catalans Dragons	66
2	Leeds Rhinos	20

=== 2024 ===
Quarter-finals
27 April
Leeds Rhinos	86
Hereford Harriers	12
27 April
Wigan Warriors	70
Halifax Panthers	32
4 May
London Roosters	108
Edinburgh Giants	4
11 May
Hull FC	6
Catalans Dragons	78

Semi-finals
18 May
Leeds Rhinos	30
Wigan Warriors	48
18 May
London Roosters	12
Catalans Dragons	74

Final
1 June
Wigan Warriors	18
Catalans Dragons	81

=== 2025 ===
The 2025 competition was competed for by eight teams. It was originally scheduled to have nine teams participating but the invitation to French team, Catalans Dragons, was withdrawn by the RFL due to a dispute between the RFL and the French governing body, the FFR, over international matches before the England wheelchair team tour Australia at the end of 2025.

Qualifying round
Sheffield Eagles	144
Warrington Wolves	20
Edinburgh Giants
Bye

Quarter-finals
Wigan Warriors	46
London Roosters	56
Hull FC	44
Leeds Rhinos	48
Sheffield Eagles	78
Edinburgh Giants	44
Halifax Panthers	w/o
Catalans Dragons	(Note: The invitation for Catalans Dragons to participate was withdrawn due to a dispute between the RFL and the FFR)

Semi-finals
London Roosters	30
Leeds Rhinos	28
Sheffield Eagles	18
Halifax Panthers	100

Final
London Roosters	24
Halifax Panthers	46

2025 Wheelchair Challenge Cup final

14 June 2025
14:00 BST (UTC+01:00)

Halifax Panthers	46–24	London Roosters
Tries: Brown, Hawkins (2), Boardman, Calcott, O'Neill, Holt, Martin; Goals: Hawkins (7/9)	1st: 30–16; 2nd: 16–8; Report	Tries: Coyd (2), King, Billington (2); Goals: Coyd (2/5)

Robin Park Arena, Wigan
Referees: M. Ball, R. Whiteley
Touch judges: O. Cruickshank, D. Butler
Player of the Match: Jack Brown (Halifax)

Team details
Halifax Panthers		Position	London Roosters
Name	Number	Position	Number	Name
Wayne Boardman	1	Starter	5	Lewis King
Rob Hawkins	2	Starter	3	Joe Coyd
Jack Brown	11	Starter	1	Mason Billington
Nathan Holmes	6	Starter	6	Matt Wass
Finlay O'Neill	14	Starter	7	Jack Linden
Joe Calcott	5	Interchange	12	Freya Levy
Jordan Holt	8	Interchange	4	Jason Owen
Tom Martin	37	Interchange	11	Casper Wass
Nathaniel Wright (not used)	12	CS	18	Jake Sawyer (not used)
Wayne Boardman		Coach		Tom Coyd

=== 2026 ===
The 2026 competition will be competed for by sixteen teams using a straight knockout format. The draw was seeded to keep the Super League teams apart in the first round.

First round
Halifax Panthers	99
Batley Bulldogs	18
Hull FC	80
Gravesend Dynamite	16
London Roosters	88
Wakefield Trinity	20
Sheffield Eagles	76
Midlands Hurricanes	32
Castleford Tigers	28
Bradford Bulls	31
North Wales Crusaders	13
Wigan Warriors	64
Rochdale Hornets	10
Edinburgh Giants	66
York Knights	10
Leeds Rhinos	182

Quarter-finals
Halifax Panthers	97
Hull FC	58
London Roosters	74
Sheffield Eagles	22
Bradford Bulls	6
Wigan Warriors	138
Edinburgh Giants	6
Leeds Rhinos	96

Semi-finals
Halifax Panthers	64
London Roosters	30
Wigan Warriors	16
Leeds Rhinos	36

Final
Halifax Panthers	92
Leeds Rhinos	24

== Finals ==
List of finals
Year	Winning team	Score	Losing team	Venue	Ref.
2015	Halifax	?–?	Mersey Storm	unknown	
2016	Halifax	92–48	Leeds Rhinos	Huddersfield Sports Centre	
2017	Halifax	110–48	Leeds Rhinos	Huddersfield Sports Centre	
2018	Halifax	62–18	Dundee Dragons	Richard Dunn Sports Centre, Bradford	
2019	Leeds Rhinos	74–46	Argonauts	English Institute of Sport, Sheffield	
2020	Tournament cancelled due to the COVID-19 pandemic				
2021	Leeds Rhinos	60–26	Argonauts	English Institute of Sport, Sheffield	
2022	Leeds Rhinos	48–34	Catalans Dragons	Allam Arena, Hull	
2023	Catalans Dragons	66–20	Leeds Rhinos	English Institute of Sport, Sheffield	
2024	Catalans Dragons	81–18	Wigan Warriors	English Institute of Sport, Sheffield	
2025	Halifax Panthers	46–24	London Roosters	Robin Park Arena, Wigan	
2026	Halifax Panthers	92–24	Leeds Rhinos	Robin Park Arena, Wigan	

=== Results by club ===
Team	Winners	Runners-up
Halifax Panthers	6	0
Leeds Rhinos	3	4
Catalans Dragons	2	1
Argonauts	0	2
Dundee Dragons	0	1
London Roosters	0	1
Mersey Storm (Note: In October 2023, Mersey Storm became Widnes Vikings when a partnership between the two clubs was established)	0	1
Wigan Warriors	0	1

== Challenge Trophy ==
In 2018, the Rugby Football League introduced a Plate competition as part of the Challenge Cup. It was planned to continue in 2019, but was instead replaced by the inaugural Wheelchair Challenge Trophy. The Challenge Trophy is played alongside the Challenge Cup, for teams outside the Super League. This was originally played as a separate competition, but in 2024 it was announced that the two finalists would qualify to take part in the Challenge Cup.

List of finals
Year	Winning team	Score	Losing team	Venue	Ref.
2018	Hereford Harriers	63–32	North Wales Crusaders	Richard Dunn Sports Centre, Bradford	
2019	Gravesend Dynamite	75–48	Hull FC	English Institute of Sport, Sheffield	
2020	Tournament cancelled due to the COVID-19 pandemic				
2021	Gravesend Dynamite	19–12	Warrington Wolves	Cardinal Newman Catholic High School, Warrigton	
2022	Gravesend Dynamite	82–40	Mersey Storm	Allam Arena, Hull	
2023	Gravesend Dynamite	88–8	Sheffield Eagles	English Institute of Sport, Sheffield	
2024	Hereford Harriers	17–16	Edinburgh Giants	National Basketball Performance Centre, Manchester	
2025	Castleford Tigers	4–0	North Wales Crusaders	University of York, York	
2026	Widnes Vikings	10–6	Warrington Wolves	David Ross Sports Village, Nottingham	

=== Results by club ===
Team	Winners	Runners-up
Gravesend Dynamite	4	0
Hereford Harriers	2	0
Widnes Vikings (Note: Runners-up in 2022 as Mersey Storm)	1	1
Castleford Tigers	1	0
North Wales Crusaders	0	2
Warrington Wolves	0	2
Edinburgh Giants	0	1
Hull FC	0	1
Sheffield Eagles	0	1

== See also ==
- Wheelchair Super League
- Challenge Cup
- Women's Challenge Cup
