= 2008 Festival of World Cups =

- Host country: Australia

The 2008 Festival of World Cups was a series of rugby league world cups held in Australia during 2008. The festival was staged in concurrence with the 2008 Men's Rugby League World Cup also in Australia and coincided with the centenary of rugby league celebrations in Australia.

The festival contained world cups for Student, Police, Women, Defence and Wheelchair teams. The Universities tournament officially started the Festival in July ahead of the remaining competitions in October.

Colin Love, the Rugby League World Cup 2008 Tournament Director and RLIF Chairman, stated "The festival highlights how the World Cup is embracing the Rugby League community and acknowledging its wide-ranging affiliates", adding "It’s a great opportunity to showcase the broad appeal of the game internationally".

== Festival schedule ==
The Festival of World Cups included:

Event	Dates	Areas/Venues	Winner
University	4 July - 19 July 2008	Griffith University and other Brisbane venues; Langlands Park (Final)	Australia
Men	25 October - 22 November 2008	Twelve venues across four Australian states; Suncorp Stadium (Final)	New Zealand
Police	2 November - 15 November 2008	Stockland Park, Sunshine Coast; Suncorp Stadium (Final)	Fiji
Women	2 November - 15 November 2008	Stockland Park, Sunshine Coast; Suncorp Stadium (Final)	New Zealand
Defence	5 November - 16 November 2008	Penrith, Townsville; Sydney Football Stadium (Final)	Great Britain
Wheelchair	7 November - 17 November 2008	Sydney metropolitan area	England

== University ==
The seventh University Rugby League World Cup was held in July, being the first of the six world cups to be held. The previous tournament was held in 2005 and won by New Zealand. The eight countries that took part were Australia, New Zealand, England, Greece, Scotland, Wales, France and Ireland. Australia defeated England in the final, while Greece won the plate competition.

19 July 2008

Australian Universities	26 - 16	England Students

Langlands Park, Brisbane

== Men ==
The thirteenth Rugby League World Cup was held throughout October and November. Ten teams took part. Defending Champions and hosts Australia, New Zealand, England, France and Papua New Guinea all qualified automatically, while Fiji, Tonga, Samoa, Ireland and Scotland all qualified through tournaments in 2006 and 2007. The final was held at Suncorp Stadium on 22 November.

22 November 2008

New Zealand	34 - 20	Australia

Suncorp Stadium, Brisbane

== Police ==
The inaugural International Police Rugby League World Cup was held during November alongside the Women's Rugby League World Cup at Stockland Park. The final was held as a curtain raiser to the first semi-final of the men's World Cup at Suncorp Stadium. AMP sponsored the event with organisers hoping would go towards the formation of an International Police Rugby League Federation.

Group stage
Team	Pld	W	D	L	Bye	PF	PA	+/−	Pts
New Zealand	4	4	0	0	1	120	36	+84	10
Fiji	4	3	0	1	1	170	50	+120	8
Australia	4	2	0	2	1	80	76	+4	6
Great Britain	4	1	0	3	1	42	126	-84	4
Papua New Guinea	4	0	0	4	1	40	164	-124	2

Note:Teams were given 2 points for a bye

3rd/4th play-off

15 November 2008

Australia	22 - 2	Great Britain

Stockland Park, Sunshine Coast
Referee: Chris Treneman

Final

15 November 2008

Fiji Police	20 - 12	New Zealand Police

Suncorp Stadium, Brisbane
Referee: Robbie Bowen

== Women ==
The third Women's Rugby League World Cup was held at Stockland Park alongside the Police World Cup. Eight teams took part including defending champions New Zealand. The final was held at Suncorp Stadium on 15 November.

15 November 2008

Australia	0 - 34	New Zealand
	Report

Suncorp Stadium, Brisbane

== Defence ==
The inaugural Defence Forces World Cup was held in Sydney with the final played at the Sydney Football Stadium as a curtain raiser to the second Semi Final of the Men's tournament. Five defence forces took part, New Zealand, Australia, Great Britain, Papua New Guinea and the Cook Islands.

Group stage
Team	Pld	W	D	L	PF	PA	+/−	Pts
Great Britain	4	4	0	0	196	68	+128	8
Australia	4	3	0	1	110	63	+47	6
New Zealand	4	2	0	2	153	80	+73	4
Cook Islands	4	1	0	3	106	128	-22	2
Papua New Guinea	4	0	0	4	22	248	-226	0

3rd/4th play-off

15 November 2008

New Zealand	32 - 10	Cook Islands

CUA Stadium, Penrith

Final

16 November 2008

Australian Defence Forces	16 - 26	Great Britain Armed Forces
	Report

Sydney Football Stadium, Sydney

== Wheelchair ==
2008 Wheelchair Rugby League World Cup
- Number of teams: 4
- Host country: Australia
- Winner: England (1st title)
- Matches played: 10
- Top scorer: (England) Adam Rigby (56)
- Top try scorer: (England) Jack Brown (11)

Four teams took part in the inaugural Wheelchair Rugby League World Cup which was held at indoor venues in Sydney. The four teams were France, Australia, England and a Barbarians scratch team which replaced New Zealand who withdrew shortly before the start of the tournament.

=== Group stage ===
Group stage
Team	Pld	W	D	L	PF	PA	+/−	Pts
England	3	3	0	0	134	48	+86	6
France	3	2	0	1	170	40	+130	4
Australia	3	1	0	2	128	78	+50	2
Barbarians	3	0	0	3	4	270	–266	0

Results
7 November: Sydney Academy of Sport, Narrabeen

England 34 – 26 Australia
Barbarians 0 – 108 France

10 November: Betts Stadium, Mount Druitt

England 74 – 4 Barbarians
Australia 14 – 44 France

12 November: Sydney Academy of Sport, Narrabeen

Australia 88 – 0 Barbarians
France 18 – 26 England

=== Finals ===
Semi-finals
1	England	66
4	Barbarians	0
3	Australia	22
2	France	20

Final
England	44
Australia	12
3rd/4th play-off
France	52
Barbarians	0

17 November 2008

England	44 – 12	Australia
	Report

Betts Stadium, Mount Druitt, Sydney
