= Coupe de France de Para Rugby XIII =

Wheelchair rugby league competition

- Sport: Wheelchair rugby league
- Inaugural season: 2006–07
- Country: France
- Winners: Catalans Dragons (2025–26)
- Most titles: Catalans Dragons
- Related competition: Elite 1

The Coupe de France de Para Rugby XIII (lit. 'Wheelchair rugby league French Cup'), is the premier knockout competition for the sport of wheelchair rugby league in France. The earliest recorded Coupe de France took place in the 2006–07 season with the cup displaying the inscription Coupe de France de Rugby A XIII Fauteuil. This was the name of the competition until the French Rugby League Federation began using the name Para Rugby XIII rather than XIII Fauteuil (XIII Wheelchair) for the sport in the 2023–24 season.

== History ==
In 2000, wheelchair rugby league was developed in France and the first competition was played by three teams, Vichy, Roanne and Beauvais, as part of a French Téléthon. In 2002, meetings took place to establish the official rules of the sport and a Trophy of France tournament was played in Vichy with six teams taking part. In the 2006–07 season, a three-team Coupe de France took place beginning in December when RC Vichy XIII Handi defeated Beauvais XIII Handisport 36–24 in a qualification match to reach the final. This was played in April following the conclusion of the Championship and saw Handisport Roannais, who had received a bye in the first round, defeat Vichy 31–14 to win the competition.

For the 2007–08 season, a Coupe de France final was scheduled to be played in May and by the 2008–09 season the competition had expanded to an eight-team tournament played in June. Over the next seven editions the Coupe de France retained this format but was usually played as a pre-season event. (Note: exceptions being in 2013–14 (April) and 2015–16 (March)) During this period Catalans Dragons dominated the competition, with the 2013–14 final being reported as the fifth time they had won the trophy. (Note: Reports regarding the number of titles won by Catalans Dragons vary: A fifth title in 2013–14 is consistent with the win in 2017–18 being reported as the seventh, but not with later totals of 12 in 2023–24 and 12 or 13 in 2024–25. There is also an article from August 2016 stating that the club had won the competition seven times) The 2015–16 competition was played as a tournament over a single weekend, with teams competing in groups to qualify for the semi-finals, but in 2016–17 the format changed so that three teams took part in the finals day of the competition, and since then it has been played as a single-elimination tournament with fixtures taking place throughout the season.

== Finals ==
List of finals by season
Season	Champions	Score	Runners-up	Ref
2006–07	Handisport Roannais	31–14	RC Vichy XIII Handi	
2007–08		–		
2008–09		–		
2009–10		–		
2010–11		–		
2011–12	Catalans Dragons	30–28	Cahors / Cadurciens Devils	
2012–13	Catalans Dragons	40–29	Cahors / Cadurciens Devils	
2013–14	Catalans Dragons	46–18	Handisport Roannais	
2014–15	Catalans Dragons	24–10	Cahors / Cadurciens Devils	
2015–16	Cahors / Cadurciens Devils	58–28	Toulouse Olympique / Saint Jory	
2016–17	Toulouse Olympique / Saint Jory	74–13	Catalans Dragons	
2017–18	Catalans Dragons	41–24	Toulouse Olympique / Saint Jory	
2018–19	SO Avignon	54–44	Catalans Dragons	
2019–20	Did not occur due to the COVID-19 pandemic			
2020–21	Did not occur due to the COVID-19 pandemic			
2021–22	Did not occur due to the COVID-19 pandemic			
2022–23	Catalans Dragons	68–42	SO Avignon	
2023–24	Catalans Dragons	54–24	SO Avignon	
2024–25	Catalans Dragons	56–29	Montauban Pandas	
2025–26	Catalans Dragons	42–27	SO Avignon	
