= Catalans Dragons Wheelchair =

French wheelchair rugby league club

Catalans Dragons
Club information
- Full name: Catalans Dragons Wheelchair Rugby League Football Club
- Nickname: The Dragons
- Colours: White, Red and Gold
- Website: catalansdragons.com

Current details
- Chairman: Bernard Guasch
- Competition: Elite 1
- 2023–24: (Champions)

Uniforms
Home colours	Away colours

Records
- Elite 1: At least 10 (2012–13, 2013–14, 2014–15, 2015–16, 2017–18, 2018–19, 2021–22, 2022–23, 2023–24, 2024-25)
- Coupe de France: 10 (2011–12, 2012–13, 2013–14, 2014–15, 2017–18, 2022–23, 2023–24, 2024-25)
- Challenge Cups: 1 (2023, 2024)
- European Club Challenges: 2 (2023, 2024)

The Catalans Dragons Wheelchair Rugby League Football Club are a French wheelchair rugby league club based in Perpignan, Pyrénées-Orientales. The club competes in the Elite 1 Championship, the top tier of the French rugby league system.

== History ==
Catalans Dragons wheelchair teams is thought to be one of the world's oldest wheelchair rugby league football clubs. Like the French Elite 1 Championship itself, it is unclear at exactly what point the club was formed, though they are known to have been in existence during the 2011–12 season in which they finished runners-up. Following this, Catalans established themselves as the dominant force in French wheelchair rugby league, winning every national championship with the exception of their 2016–17 Grand Final defeat to Toulouse Olympique. In 2022, Catalans player Sebastien Bechara won the IRL Golden Boot. Along with, the French league and cup, the teams also has started to compete in the British Wheelchair Challenge Cup, which they won their inaugural title in 2023 after finishing runners-up the year before. 2023 saw another Catalans player win the IRL Golden Boot, this time Jérémy Bourson. Also in 2023, as winners of the previous season's national championship, Catalans qualified for a new competition, the European Club Challenge, in which the French league champions would compete against the British league champions for the de facto European title. The Dragons shared the 2023 title with Halifax Panthers after a 32–32 draw, before qualifying again the following year and taking the title outright after a 68–28 defeat of Wigan Warriors. In 2025, their invitation to participate in the Challenge Cup was withdrawn by the Rugby Football League due to a fallout with the French Rugby League Federation over them refusing to play international fixtures between England and France until after the 2026 World Cup.

== Seasons ==
Season	League										Coupe de France	Year	Challenge Cup	European Club Challenge
Season	Division	P	W	D	L	F	A	Pts	Pos	Play-offs	Coupe de France	Year	Challenge Cup	European Club Challenge
2011–12	Elite 1	Unknown							?	Runners-up	Champions	2012	No Competition	No Competition
2012–13	Elite 1	Unknown							?	Champions	Champions	2013	No Competition	No Competition
2013–14	Elite 1	Unknown							?	Champions	Champions	2014	No Competition	No Competition
2014–15	Elite 1	Unknown							?	Champions	Champions	2015	Did not participate	No Competition
2015–16	Elite 1	Unknown							?	Champions	Semi-finals	2016	Did not participate	No Competition
2016–17	Elite 1	Unknown							?	Runners-up	Runners-up	2017	Did not participate	No Competition
2017–18	Elite 1	Unknown							?	Champions	Champions	2018	Did not participate	No Competition
2018–19	Elite 1	Unknown							?	Champions	Runners-up	2019	Did not participate	No Competition
2019–20	Elite 1	Competitions cancelled due to the COVID-19 pandemic										2020	Did not participate	No Competition
2020–21	Elite 1	Competitions cancelled due to the COVID-19 pandemic										2021	Did not participate	No Competition
2021–22	Elite 1	Unknown							?	Champions	Cancelled	2022	Runners-up	No Competition
2022–23	Elite 1	Unknown							?	Champions	Champions	2023	Champions	Champions
2023–24	Elite 1	Unknown						44	2nd	Champions	Champions	2024	Champions	Champions
2024–25	Elite 1	Unknown							?	Champions	Champions	2025	Expelled (Note: Catalans Dragons were expelled from the Challenge Cup by the Rugby Football League following a falling out with the French Rugby League Federation over international fixtures.)	No Competition

== Honours ==
=== Leagues ===
- (France) Elite 1

Winners (At least 10): 2012–13, 2013–14, 2014–15, 2015–16, 2017–18, 2018–19, 2021–22, 2022–23, 2023–24, 2024–25

=== Cups ===
- Coupe de France

Winners (10): ? x2, (Note: 2017–18 is recorded as the seventh title) 2011–12, 2012–13, 2013–14, 2014–15, 2017–18, 2022–23, 2023–24, 2024–25

- (United Kingdom) Challenge Cup

Winners (2): 2023, 2024

=== International ===
- European Club Challenge

Winners (2): 2023, 2024
