= Elite 1 (wheelchair rugby league) =

Rugby league in France

Elite 1 Wheelchair Championship
- Sport: Wheelchair rugby league
- No. of teams: 6
- Country: France
- Most recent champion: Catalans Dragons
- Most titles: Catalans Dragons (11+ titles)
- Level on pyramid: 1
- Relegation to: Elite 2
- Website: FFRXIII: Championnat Elite Para Rugby XIII

The Elite 1 Wheelchair Championship is the highest level of wheelchair rugby league in France.

Starting in 2023, the previous year's league champions play the previous year's British Super League champions in the European Club Challenge.

== History ==
Wheelchair rugby league was developed by French rugby league players and coaches, Robert Fassolette and Wally Salvan, in 2000. The first competition was played by three teams, Vichy, Roanne and Beauvais, as part of a French Téléthon. Meetings establishing the official rules of the sport took place in 2002 and in the same year a Trophy of France tournament took place in Vichy with six teams taking part. The sport spread to the south of France with the establishment of teams from Perpignan, Cahors, and Montauban in 2004, and the inclusion of wheelchair rugby league in a national development program that provided equipment to numerous regional sports centres. The French competition was the world's first thought it is unknown at what point the league became the Elite One Championship, named after the highest tier of the French running game at the time. In the 2006–07 season, the three-team Championship was won by Vichy. In the 2011–12 season, six teams competed in the Championship and six more took part in development tournaments. The following season there were four teams in the Elite 1 competition and six in Elite 2. In the 2013–14 season this was restructured as a single Championship of ten teams, but the growth of the sport meant that the following season there were 15 teams divided between Elite 1 and 2 as well as several reserve teams. In the 2023–24 season, the Elite 1 had six teams below which were the Elite 2 and National divisions. The season was also the first for which French Rugby League Federation used the name Para Rugby XIII rather than XIII Fauteuil (XIII Wheelchair) for the sport. For the 2024–25 season, it was announced that the Elite championship would have 11 teams divided between two pools from which teams would qualify for the play-offs.

== Format ==
For 2025–26 season, the teams were divided into two pools and played a double round robin competition. These were followed by play-offs and a grand final.

=== Teams ===
As of 2025–26 the teams are:

- Elite 1 – Pool A
  - Aingirak Euskadi
  - SO Avignon
  - Catalans Dragons
  - Cavaillon
  - Montauban
  - Stade Toulousian Olympique
- Elite 1 – Pool B
  - Catalan Dragons 2
  - Saint Jory
  - Stade Toulousian
  - Toulon Provence Méditerranée (RFCTPM)
  - Valencia – La Voulte

== Finals ==
List of grand finals by season
Season	Champions	Score	Runners-up	Ref
2011–12	Cahors / Cadurciens Devils	47–38	Catalans Dragons	
2012–13	Catalans Dragons	61–26	Cahors / Cadurciens Devils	
2013–14	Catalans Dragons	44–40	Cahors / Cadurciens Devils	
2014–15	Catalans Dragons	68–26	Cahors / Cadurciens Devils	
2015–16	Catalans Dragons	29–26	Toulouse Olympique / Saint Jory	
2016–17	Toulouse Olympique / Saint Jory	52–34	Catalans Dragons	
2017–18	Catalans Dragons	43–29	SO Avignon	
2018–19	Catalans Dragons	58–42	SO Avignon	
2019–20	Did not occur due to the COVID-19 pandemic			
2020–21	Did not occur due to the COVID-19 pandemic			
2021–22	Catalans Dragons	56–28	Montauban Pandas	
2022–23	Catalans Dragons	56–33	Montauban Pandas	
2023–24	Catalans Dragons	26–22	Montauban Pandas	
2024–25	Catalans Dragons	70–38	Montauban Pandas	
2025–26	Catalans Dragons	67–63	SO Avignon	

== See also ==
- Coupe de France de Para Rugby XIII
