= England national wheelchair rugby league team =

Team representing England in Wheelchair Rugby League

England
Team information
- Governing body: Rugby Football League
- Region: Europe
- IRL ranking: 1 (21 August 2026)

Team results
- World Cup
- Appearances: 5 (first time in 2008)
- Best result: Winners (2008, 2021, 2026)

The England national wheelchair rugby league team represents England in wheelchair rugby league. The team have played in all four World Cup tournaments, winning both the inaugural competition in 2008 and the 2021 edition on home soil, and being runners up in both 2013 and 2017. They also won the 2015 European Rugby League Championship.

Wheelchair rugby league was introduced to England in July 2005 when a team from France toured Yorkshire. On 4 May 2006, the Rugby League International Federation accepted a proposal by France to endorse wheelchair rugby league. Later that month a team representing Great Britain began a tour of France and played the first official test match on 3 June 2006 losing 20–6 to their hosts. The England team was established in 2007 under the auspices of the British Wheelchair Tag Rugby League Association and played its first test match, against France the same year.

The team are sponsored by Betfred in a two-year deal signed in 2022 that included the wheelchair, men's and women's teams. They train at facilities including Calderdale College in Halifax and St George's Park National Football Centre.

== Current squad ==
Squad selected for the 2026 Wheelchair Rugby League World Cup in Australia.

Player	Club
Mason Billington	London Roosters
Jack Brown (VC)	Halifax Panthers
Nathan Collins	Leeds Rhinos
Joe Coyd	London Roosters
Luis Domingos	Sheffield Eagles
Rob Hawkins	Halifax Panthers
Chris Haynes	Sheffield Eagles
Lewis King (C)	London Roosters
Tristan Norfolk	Leeds Rhinos
Finlay O'Neill	Halifax Panthers

== Competitive record ==
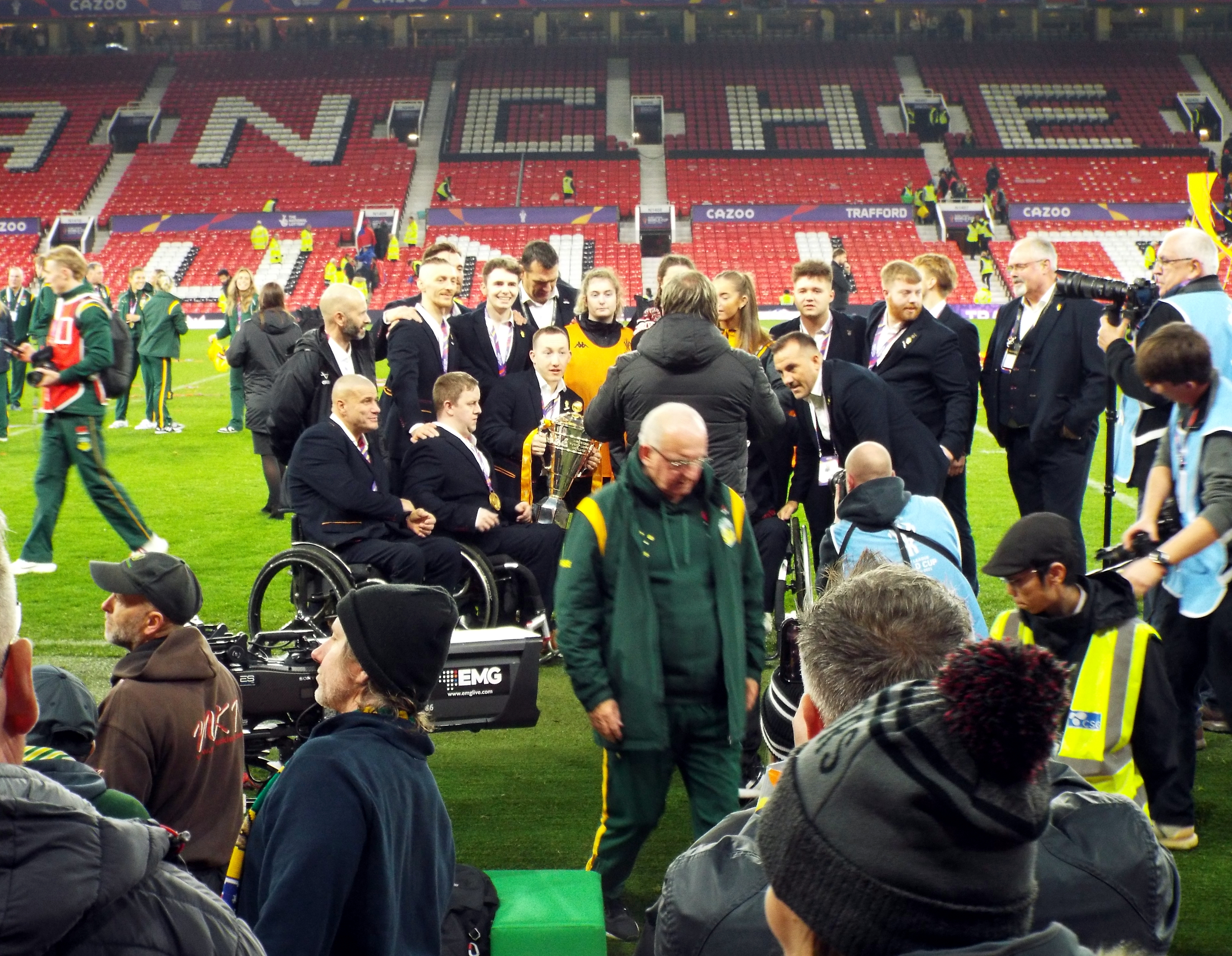
England wheelchair rugby league team celebrating at Old Trafford in 2022

World Cup Record
Year	Finish
(Australia) 2008	Champions
(England) 2013	Runners-up
(France) 2017	Runners-up
(England) 2021	Champions
(Australia) 2026	Champions

=== Results ===
Date	Score (Note: England score given first)	Opponent	Competition	Venue	Attendance	Ref.
2007	?–?	France	Friendly	Harrow, London		
7 November 2008	34–26	Australia	2008 Rugby League World Cup Group Stage	Sydney Academy of Sport, Narrabeen		
10 November 2008	72–4	Barbarians (Note: The Barbarians/Pacific Islands were a replacement team due to New Zealand withdrawing from the 2008 World Cup)	2008 Rugby League World Cup Group Stage	Mount Druitt, Sydney		
12 November 2008	26–18	France	2008 Rugby League World Cup Group Stage	Sydney Academy of Sport, Narrabeen		
14 November 2008	66–0	Barbarians	2008 Rugby League World Cup Semi Final	Whitlam Centre, Sydney		
17 November 2008	44–12	Australia	2008 Rugby League World Cup Final	Betts Stadium, Sydney		
28 August 2009	36–38	France	Friendly	Brunel University, London		
16 October 2010	34–44	France	Friendly	Cahors	1,060	
8 October 2011	34–32	France	Friendly	Leigh Sports Village, Leigh		
7 July 2012	34–12	Ireland	2012 Four Nations	Hull		
8 July 2012	50–0	Scotland	2012 Four Nations	Hull		
8 July 2012	34–0	Wales	2012 Four Nations	Hull		
27 August 2012	22–43	France	Friendly: Fassolette-Kielty Trophy	Medway Park, Gillingham	700	
3 July 2013	20–28	France	2013 Rugby League World Cup Group Stage	Medway Park, Gillingham		
6 July 2013	86–8	Ireland	2013 Rugby League World Cup Group Stage	Medway Park, Gillingham		
9 July 2013	50–6	Wales	2013 Rugby League World Cup Group Stage	Medway Park, Gillingham		
11 July 2013	81–10	Australia	2013 Rugby League World Cup Semi Final	Medway Park, Gillingham		
13 July 2013	40–42	France	2013 Rugby League World Cup Final	Medway Park, Gillingham		
9 May 2014	46–64	France	Friendly: Fassolette-Kielty Trophy	Kindarena, Rouen	2,700	
13 September 2014	104–14	Scotland	2014 Four Nations	Medway Park, Gillingham		
September 2014	54–2	Ireland	2014 Four Nations	Medway Park, Gillingham		
14 September 2014	80–6	Wales	2014 Four Nations	Medway Park, Gillingham		
23 September 2015	56–26	France	Friendly: Fassolette-Kielty Trophy	Medway Park, Gillingham		
24 September 2015	24–26	France	2015 Rugby League European Championship Group Stage	Medway Park, Gillingham		
25 September 2015	56–8	Wales	2015 Rugby League European Championship Group Stage	Medway Park, Gillingham		
25 September 2015	66–16	Ireland	2015 Rugby League European Championship Group Stage	Medway Park, Gillingham		
25 September 2015	102–0	Scotland	2015 Rugby League European Championship Group Stage	Medway Park, Gillingham		
26 September 2015	28–24	France	2015 Rugby League European Championship Final	Medway Park, Gillingham		
24 September 2016	90–10	Scotland	2016 Four Nations	Mayfield Sports Centre, Rochdale		
24 September 2016	94–0	Exiles (Note: The Exiles were a mix of Irish, Welsh and English players as Ireland were unable to travel with a full side to the 2016 Four Nations)	2016 Four Nations	Mayfield Sports Centre, Rochdale		
25 September 2016	56–14	Wales	2016 Four Nations	Mayfield Sports Centre, Rochdale		
25 September 2016	52–26	Wales	2016 Four Nations	Mayfield Sports Centre, Rochdale		
20 July 2017	31–71	France	2017 Rugby League World Cup Group Stage	Halle aux Sport, Carcassonne		
22 July 2017	78–32	Wales	2017 Rugby League World Cup Group Stage	Complexe La Rijole, Pamiers		
24 July 2017	80–26	Australia	2017 Rugby League World Cup Group Stage	Gymnase du Lac, Saint-Jory		
26 July 2017	76–24	Australia	2017 Rugby League World Cup Semi Final	Gymnase Compans Cafferlli, Toulouse		
28 July 2017	34–38	France	2017 Rugby League World Cup Final	Parc des Expositions, Perpignan		
21 June 2019	31–25	France	Two match series friendly: Fassolette-Kielty Trophy	Gymnase M. Guigou, Apt		
23 June 2019	46–50	France	Two match series friendly: Fassolette-Kielty Trophy	Palais des Sports de Toulon		
28 September 2019	48–24	Wales	2019 Tri-Nations	Plas Madoc Leisure Centre, Wrexham		
28 September 2019	136–1	Scotland	2019 Tri-Nations	Plas Madoc Leisure Centre, Wrexham		
29 September 2019	54–40	Wales	2019 Tri-Nations	Plas Madoc Leisure Centre, Wrexham		
October 2019	62–12	North Queensland	2019 tour of Australia			
October 2019	104–12	Queensland	2019 tour of Australia			
21 October 2019	84–28	Australia	2019 tour of Australia	Whitlam Leisure Centre, Sydney		
23 October 2019	58–50	Australia	2019 tour of Australia	University of Wollongong, Wollongong		
25 October 2019	86–20	New South Wales	2019 tour of Australia			
26 June 2021	102–22	Wales	Friendly	English Institute of Sport, Sheffield		
10 November 2021	24–49	France	Two match series friendly: Fassolette-Kielty Trophy	Medway Park, Gillingham		
13 November 2021	26–39	France	Two match series friendly: Fassolette-Kielty Trophy	Medway Park, Gillingham		
19 June 2022	62–48	France	Friendly: Fassolette-Kielty Trophy	National Basketball Centre, Manchester		
3 November 2022	38–8	Australia	2021 Rugby League World Cup Group Stage	Copper Box, London	3,033	
6 November 2022	104–12	Spain	2021 Rugby League World Cup Group Stage	Copper Box, London	3,268	
9 November 2022	121–0	Ireland	2021 Rugby League World Cup Group Stage	Copper Box, London	3,847	
13 November 2022	125–22	Wales	2021 Rugby League World Cup Semi Final	English Institute of Sport, Sheffield	1,318	
18 November 2022	28–24	France	2021 Rugby League World Cup final	Manchester Central, Manchester	4,526	
5 November 2023	34–43	France	Two match series friendly: Fassolette-Kielty Trophy	Leeds Arena, Leeds	2,373	
25 November 2023	34–18	France	Two match series friendly: Fassolette-Kielty Trophy	Palais des Sports, Marseille		
26 October 2024	66–33	France	Friendly: Fassolette-Kielty Trophy	Robin Park Arena, Wigan		
21 November 2024	58–28	Spain	Friendly	Nantes		
23 November 2024	28–32	France	Friendly: Fassolette-Kielty Trophy	Saint-Lô	~2,000	
24 October 2025	86–10	New South Wales	2025 tour of Australia	Whitlam Leisure Centre, Sydney		
27 October 2025	72–60	Queensland	2025 tour of Australia	Caloundra Sports Centre, Sunshine Coast		
30 October 2025	56–28	Australia	2025 tour of Australia	Gold Coast Sports and Leisure Centre, Gold Coast		
2 November 2025	48–42	Australia	2025 tour of Australia	Gold Coast Sports and Leisure Centre, Gold Coast		
30 October 2026	98–18	Wales	2026 Rugby League World Cup Group stage	WIN Entertainment Centre, Wollongong		
3 November 2026	134–0	United States	2026 Rugby League World Cup Group stage	WIN Entertainment Centre, Wollongong		
6 November 2026	68–32	Ireland	2026 Rugby League World Cup Group stage	WIN Entertainment Centre, Wollongong		
10 November 2026	86–18	Australia	2026 Rugby League World Cup semi-final	WIN Entertainment Centre, Wollongong		
13 November 2026	50–38	France	2026 Rugby League World Cup Final	WIN Entertainment Centre, Wollongong		

== Records and statistics ==
IRL Wheelchair World Rankings
Official rankings as of August 2026
Rank	Change	Team	Pts %
1	Steady	England	100
2	Steady	France	88
3	Steady	Ireland	67
4	Steady	Australia	64
5	Steady	Wales	43
6	Steady	Scotland	39
7	Steady	Spain	26
8	Steady	United States	22
9	Steady	New Zealand	5
10	Steady	Italy	0
Complete rankings at www.internationalrugbyleague.com

England historical IRL Wheelchair World Rankings
	Jun 2020	Dec 2021	Jun 2022	Dec 2022	Jun 2023	Dec 2023	Jun 2024	Dec 2024	Jun 2025	Nov 2025	Aug 2026
Ranking	2	2	2	1 (▲1)	1	1	1	1	1	1	1
References											

The team has only ever lost to France, the originators of the wheelchair game. England's biggest defeat was 31–71 on 20 July 2017.

England's biggest win was 136–1 over Scotland on 28 September 2019; their biggest win without conceding was 134–0 over the United States on 3 November 2026.

== Honours ==
- World Cup (3): (2008, 2021, 2026)
- Ashes (2): (2019, 2025)
- European Championship (1): (2015)
- Four/Tri Nations (4): (2012, 2014, 2016, 2019)
- Fassolette-Kielty Trophy: 5 Titles

== See also ==
- Rugby league in England
- England men's national rugby league team
- England women's national rugby league team
- Fassolette-Kielty Trophy
- Rugby Football League
- British Rugby League Hall of Fame
