= James Simpson (wheelchair rugby league) =

English soldier and wheelchair rugby league player (born 1985/86)

James Simpson-Hill MBE
- Born: James Simpson c.1985–1986 Leeds, West Yorkshire, England, United Kingdom
- Spouse: Josie Simpson-Hill (née Hill) (m. 2025)
- Military career
- Allegiance: United Kingdom
- Branch: British Army
- Service years: c.2002/03–2009
- Rank: Lance corporal
- Unit: 1st Battalion Yorkshire Regiment
- Conflicts: War in Afghanistan (2001–2021)
- Rugby league career

Playing information
Club
Years	Team	Pld	T	G	FG	P
2012–22	Leeds Rhinos
Representative
Years	Team	Pld	T	G	FG	P
2014–22	England	31
2026–	Scotland	2

Coaching information
Club
Years	Team	Gms	W	D	L	W%
2023–	Leeds Rhinos

James Simpson-Hill (né Simpson) MBE is an English former soldier of the British Army and wheelchair rugby league player, and current wheelchair rugby league coach who is currently the head coach of Leeds Rhinos in the RFL Wheelchair Super League whom he spend his entire playing career. He also has an extensive international career representing both England and Scotland.

In the King's 2023 Birthday Honours he was appointed Member of the Order of the British Empire for services to wheelchair rugby league football.

== Military career ==
James Simpson was a soldier serving in the British Army's 1st Battalion Yorkshire Regiment. He joined the army at 17-years-old, which saw him fight in the United Kingdom's campaign in Afghanistan. During his second combat tour, in 2009, six years into his service, an IED detonated when Simpson was on routine patrol resulting in him losing both his legs. He was medically discharged, retiring as a Lance corporal. Following his discharge and recovery, he learnt to walk again using prosthetics after three years of physiotherapy.

== Rugby League career ==
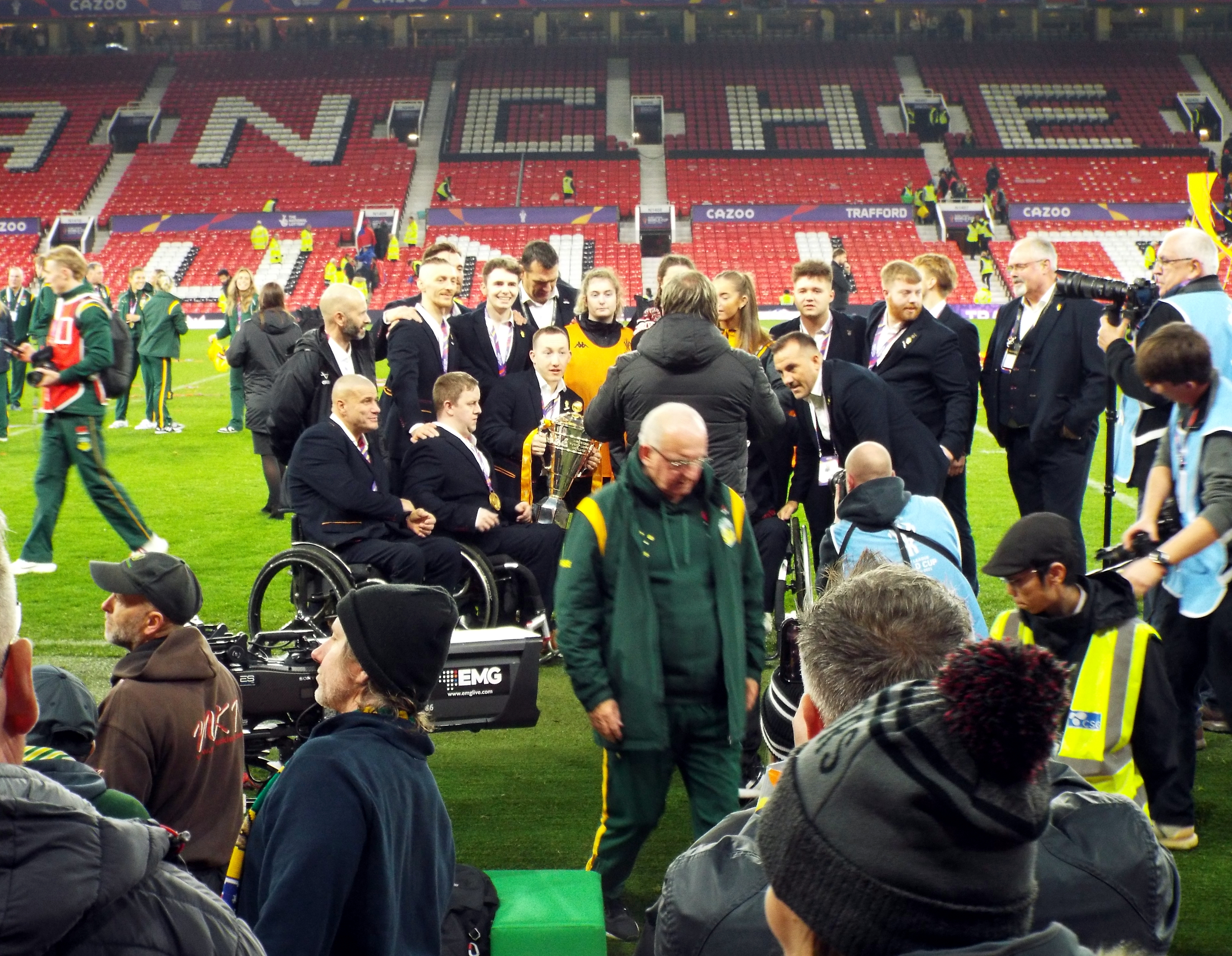
Simpson (hidden in view) with the England national wheelchair rugby league team, celebrating their 2021 World Cup victory at Old Trafford in 2022

=== Leeds Rhinos ===
==== Playing career ====
James Simpson made his debut for Leeds Rhinos in 2012 and was one of the founding members of the club.

In 2017, he captained the club to their first Grand Final, losing 54–68 to Halifax Panthers. The following year, he ended up of the other side of the score, winning the 2018 title beat the holders 54–44. In 2019 he won the League Leaders' Shield and Challenge Cup, in addition to joining the club's coaching staff. In 2021, the first season after the COVID-19 pandemic, Leeds retain the League Leaders' Shield and the Challenge Cup in addition to beating Leyland Warriors 52–36 in the Grand Final to complete the first wheelchair treble. The following year, Simpson lead his side back to Challenge Cup final, beating Catalans Dragons 48–34 to win the cup for a third year in a row.

On 13 January 2023, Simpson retired as a player from wheelchair rugby league and became head coach of Leeds Rhinos, the club in which he spent his entire career.

==== Coaching career ====
In Simpson's first season as head coach, Leeds Rhinos again retained the League Leaders' Shield, and reached the Challenge Cup and Super League Grand Finals. However, in these finals, Leeds lost to Catalans Dragons and Wigan Warriors respectively. 2024, saw Simpson win his first Super League title as head coach, in addition to retaining the League Leaders' Shield. Following the season he achieved his Level 3 Coaching Certificate, enabling him to coach in the professional game. In getting his certificate, he became the first UK Level 3 coach from the Wheelchair game.

In 2024, Simpson joined on the coaching staff of the Lancashire Academy team in the running game and the Scotland national wheelchair rugby league team in addition to his role at Leeds.

=== International and representative ===
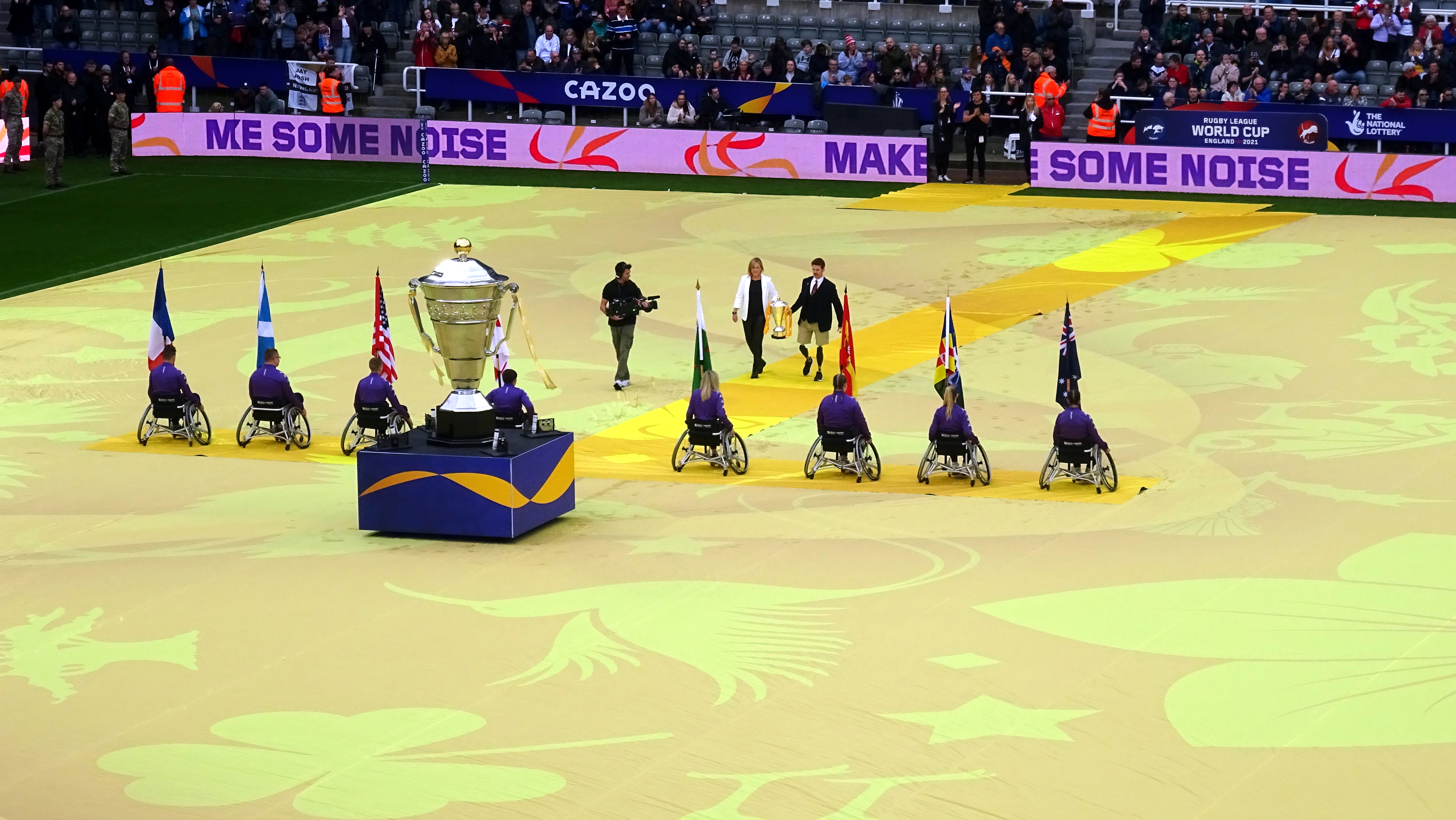
Simpson (right) bringing out the Wheelchair Rugby League World Cup trophy at the opening ceremony of the 2021 World Cup

==== England ====
James Simpson made his England debut in 2014. He played in his first Wheelchair Rugby League World Cup at the 2017 tournament where England finished runners-up losing to France in the final. He again played in the 2021 tournament. In England's final group game, he scored four tries in a 121–0 victory over Ireland. England again reached the final, finishing the tournament as champions, beating France 28–24. Simpson was also an ambassador for the tournament. Simpson retired the following January from elite level wheelchair rugby league having played 31 times for England.

==== Post retirement ====
Following his retirement from elite level, Simpson-Hill continued playing for the UK Armed Forces representative side. He scored one try in their narrow loss to Wales in November 2025, before scoring two in the reverse fixture in March 2026.

==== Scotland ====
In May 2026, Simpson-Hill came out of international retirement to play for Scotland in the Celtic Cup. Simpson-Hill qualifying for Scotland via his father, and the switch from England to Scotland being eligible as Scotland is a tier two nation. In October, Simpson-Hill was called up by Scotland for the 2026 Wheelchair Rugby League World Cup.

== Personal life ==
James Simpson supports Leeds Rhinos.

Simpson married Josie Hill on 17 May 2025, the couple met while in Wiltshire while Simpson was volunteering with the London 2012 Paralympics.

== Honours ==
=== Leeds Rhinos ===
==== Player ====
- Super League (and predecessor tournaments):
  - Champions (2): 2018, 2021
- Challenge Cup:
  - Champions (3): 2019, 2021, 2022
- League Leaders' Shield:
  - Champions (3): 2019, 2021, 2022

==== Coach ====
- Super League:
  - Champions (1): 2024
- League Leaders' Shield:
  - Champions (2): 2023, 2024

=== England ===
- World Cup:
  - Champions (1): 2021
  - Runner-up (1): 2017
- European Championship:
  - Champions (1): 2015

=== Orders ===
- Order of the British Empire:
  - MBE: 2023 (services to wheelchair rugby league football)
