= Tom Halliwell =

England international wheelchair rugby league player

Tom Halliwell OBE
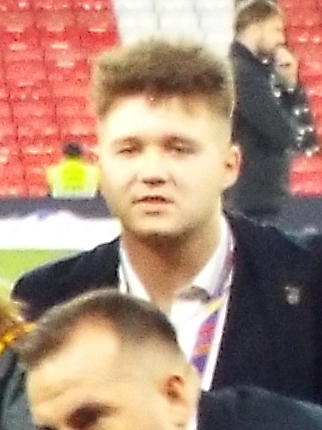

Personal information
- Full name: Thomas Edward Halliwell
- Born: 13 July 1999 (age 27)

Playing information
Club
Years	Team	Pld	T	G	FG	P
–c. 2012-2013	Oulton Invaders Juniors (Running)
c. 2012–2013–	Leeds Rhinos
	Total	0	0	0	0	0
Representative
Years	Team	Pld	T	G	FG	P
2015–	England

Tom Halliwell OBE is an English wheelchair rugby league player who currently plays for Leeds Rhinos in RFL Wheelchair Super League and the England national wheelchair rugby league team whom he has captained since 2021.

In the King's 2023 Birthday Honours he was appointed Officer of the Order of the British Empire for services to wheelchair rugby league football.

== Background ==
Tom Halliwell is an able-bodied wheelchair rugby league player. He originally played the running game at youth level but suffered a severe leg fracture, aged 13, while at Oulton Invaders. Following initial recovery, but while still unable to play the running game, Halliwell took up wheelchair rugby league with Leeds Rhinos. He never returned to the running game, having established himself as part of the Leeds squad.

== Career ==
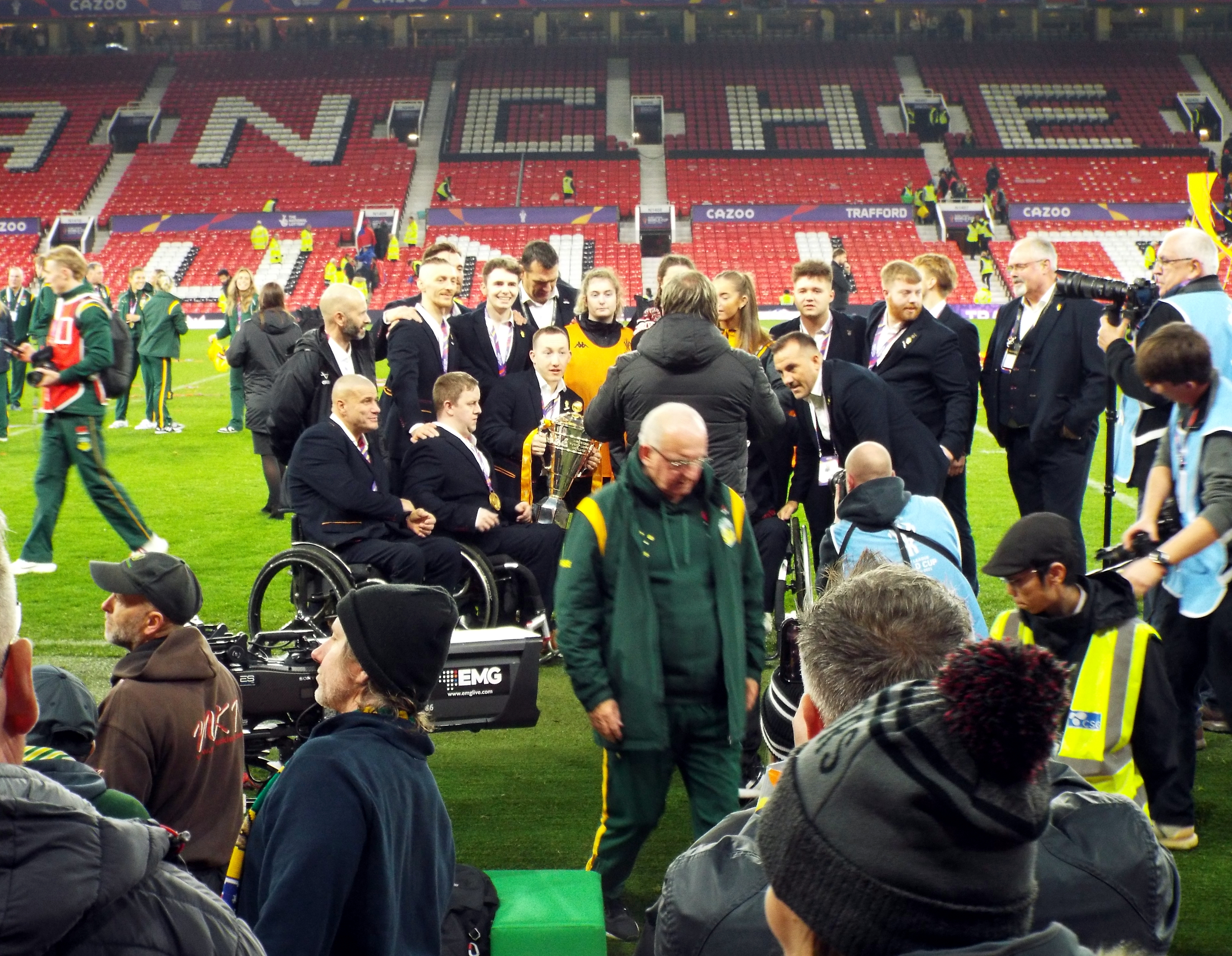
Halliwell (back row; second right) with the England national wheelchair rugby league team, celebrating their 2021 World Cup victory at Old Trafford in 2022

=== Club ===
Tom Halliwell was part of the Leeds squad which won their first ever national championship in 2018 and was named MVP. He again was a key player in Leeds's 2021 Super League Grand Final victory against Layland Warriors.

=== International ===
Halliwell made his England debut aged 16 at the European Championship in 2015. England won the tournament and Halliwell was their top scorer with 88 points. He represented England at the Wheelchair Rugby League World Cup in 2017 where England finished runners-up losing to France in the final. Halliwell was announced as captain in June 2021 ahead of a friendly against Wales. Halliwell scored three tries in the game winning 102–22. His first World Cup as captain was in 2022, following the postponement of the 2021 tournament. England finished the tournament as champions, beating France 28–24. He played in England's 2023 international series wheelchair game against France.

== Honours ==
=== Leeds ===
- Super League (and predecessor tournaments):
  - Champions (2): 2018, 2021
- Challenge Cup:
  - Champions (3): 2019, 2021, 2022
- League Leaders' Shield:
  - Champions (4): 2019, 2021, 2022, 2023

=== England ===
- World Cup:
  - Champions (1): 2021
  - Runner-up (1): 2017
- European Championship:
  - Champions (1): 2015

=== Orders ===
- Order of the British Empire:
  - OBE: 2023 (services to wheelchair rugby league football)
