= Joe Coyd =

English wheelchair rugby league player

Personal information
- Born: 1997/98

Playing information
Club
Years	Team	Pld	T	G	FG	P
2011–21	Medway Dragons
2022–	London Roosters
	Total	0	0	0	0	0
Representative
Years	Team	Pld	T	G	FG	P
2013–	England
- As of 16 November 2026
Medals
Wheelchair rugby league
Representing England
World Cup
Winner	2021 England
Winner	2026 Australia
Runner-up	2013 England
Runner-up	2017 France

Joe Coyd is an English wheelchair rugby league player. He currently plays for London Roosters in the RFL Wheelchair Super League and the England national wheelchair rugby league team.

== Career ==
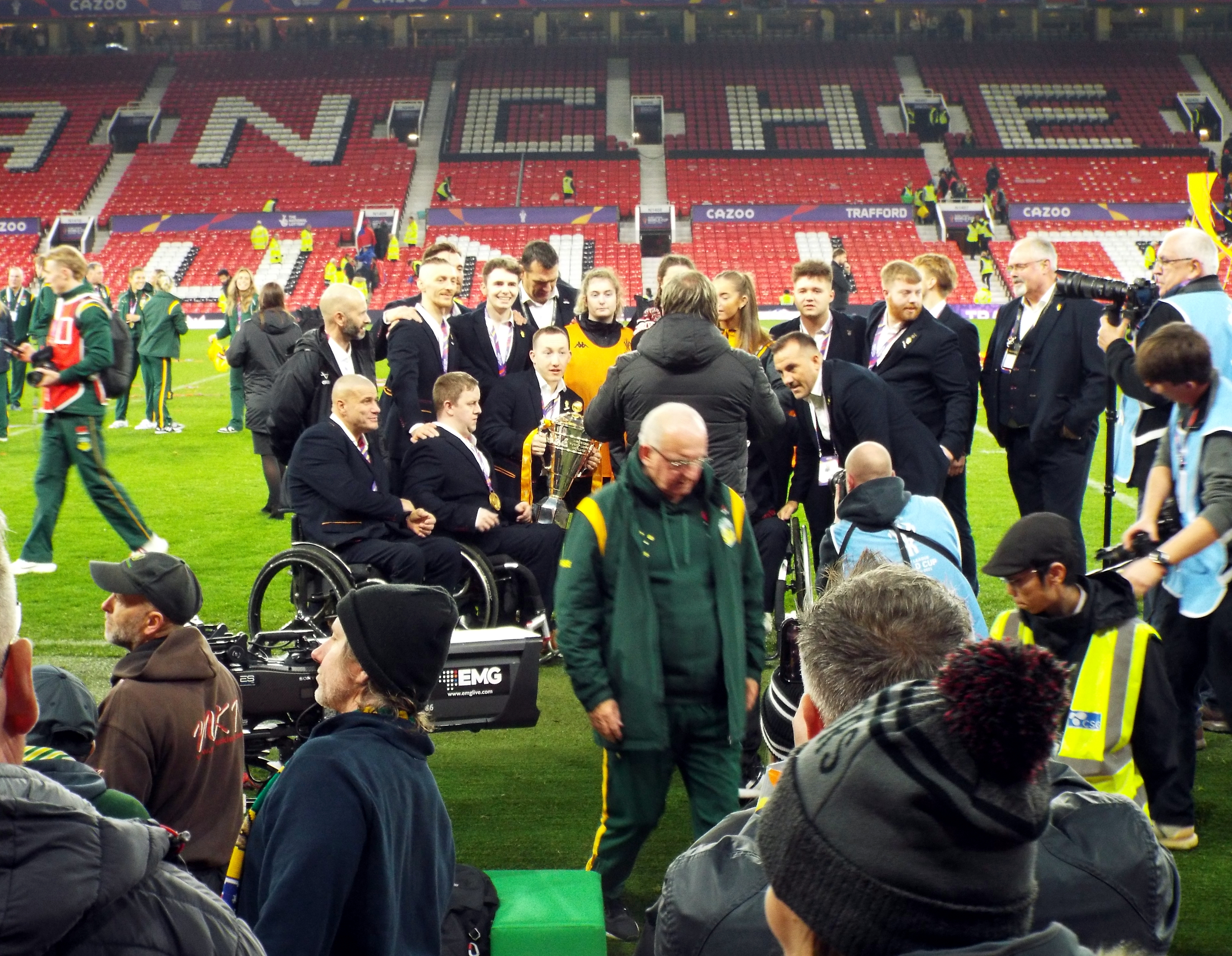
Coyd (not in view) with the England national wheelchair rugby league team, celebrating their 2021 World Cup victory at Old Trafford in 2022

=== Club ===
Coyd had had experience in the amateur level of the running game before converting to the wheelchair game at a Medway Dragons taster session in 2011. His club merged with Gravesend Dynamite and Argonauts to form London Roosters in 2022. In 2025, he was awarded the Wheels of Steel.

=== International ===
Tom Coyd represents England at the 2013 Wheelchair Rugby League World Cup,, being called up at 15 years old. He was again selected in 2017. Coyd was selected again in 2021 which saw England reclaim the world title. England defended their title at the 2026 world cup with Coyd's performances shortlisting him for the IRL Golden Boot Award.

== Family ==
Joe Coyd's older brother Tom is the head coach of the England national team. Their father Martin was also an England international, and was one of the early pioneers of the sport in England.

== Honours ==
=== England ===
- World Cup:
  - Champions (2): 2021, 2026

=== Individual ===
- Wheels of Steel:
  - Winners (1): 2025
