= Jodie Boyd-Ward =

England, Ireland, and Wales international rugby league player

Personal information
- Born: 10 October 1992 (age 34) Wolverhampton, West Midlands, England

Playing information
Club
Years	Team	Pld	T	G	FG	P
2012–	Leeds Rhinos
Representative
Years	Team	Pld	T	G	FG	P
2012–13	Ireland	7	4	0	0	16
2014–19	England	22	15	0	0	60
2021–26	Wales	22	17	0	0	68
- Source: As of 14 November 2026

Jodie Boyd-Ward (born 10 October 1992) is a wheelchair rugby league footballer who has played for three different nations at four consecutive Wheelchair World Cups. Boyd-Ward represented Wales at the 2021 and 2026 tournaments. Boyd-Ward has previously represented Ireland at the 2013 World Cup and England in the 2017 World Cup. Boyd-Ward plays domestic rugby for Leeds Rhinos wheelchair rugby league team.

Boyd-Ward was born in Wolverhampton. She began to develop mobility issues as a youngster and was diagnosed with arthritis. Initially she played wheelchair basketball before giving rugby league a try through her local sports club in Wolverhampton; it was a sport that at first she hated. Encouraged by her grandfather, Boyd-Ward persevered with rugby and was approached by the Leeds Rhinos wheelchair team to move to Yorkshire. Through her parents Boyd-Ward qualified to represent Ireland and was selected by Ireland to play in the inaugural Wheelchair Four Nations in 2012. Following her performances in the Four Nations Boyd-Ward was a member of the Ireland team during the 2013 Wheelchair World Cup.

The following year Boyd-Ward changed allegiance to play for England in the 2014 Four Nations tournament and went on to make 20 appearances between 2014 and 2019 including the 2017 World Cup.

In 2021 Boyd-Ward was approached by Wales to play for the Wales national team. Qualified to represent the country through her grandfather, Boyd-Ward made her debut for Wales in 2021 against Ireland in the Celtic Cup. Boyd-Ward was selected for the Wales squad for the delayed 2021 Wheelchair Rugby League World Cup played in November 2022 in England.

Boyd-Ward announced her retirement from international competition after the 2026 World Cup having become the first player in the sport to reach 50 international caps.

At domestic level Boyd-Ward has played for Leeds Rhinos since 2013 and has won all the domestic titles and was part of the Leeds team that won the Treble (Challenge Cup, League Leaders and Super League Grand Final) in 2021 as the team went unbeaten. Boyd-Ward is the current captain of Leeds Rhinos.

== Recognition ==
Boyd-Ward's name is one of those featured on the sculpture Ribbons, unveiled in 2024.
