= New Zealand national wheelchair rugby league team =

New Zealand
Team information
- Nickname: Wheel Kiwis
- Region: Asia-Pacific
- IRL ranking: 9 (21 August 2026)

Team results
- First international
- New Zealand 4–98 Australia; Auckland, New Zealand (1 November 2024)
- Biggest win
- New Zealand 30–26 United States; Wollongong, Australia (12 November 2026)
- Biggest defeat
- France 120–10 New Zealand; Wollongong, Australia (3 November 2026)
- World Cup
- Appearances: 1 (first time in 2026)
- Best result: 7th (2026)

The New Zealand national wheelchair rugby league team represents New Zealand in wheelchair rugby league.

== History ==
When the first Wheelchair Rugby League World Cup was held in Australia in 2008, it was planned that New Zealand would take part, but the team withdrew shortly before the start of the tournament. They were replaced by a scratch team, the Pacific Island Barbarians, which included former New Zealand international Tawera Nikau.

As one of the top three rugby league nations in the running game, the absence of a wheelchair team representing New Zealand at the 2021 World Cup was notable and led to a number of groups, including the New Zealand Warriors Community Foundation, New Zealand Rugby League and Disability Sport Auckland, working towards developing the sport in New Zealand with the aim of participating in the next World Cup. Assistance also came from Australia, with the Australia national team keen to build a strong trans-Tasman rivalry. In November 2024, the New Zealand team played their first international match in a Test series against Australia at the Eventfinda Stadium, Auckland. Jamie Tapp became the first player to score for New Zealand, but Australia won both matches for a 2–0 series victory. In December 2024, New Zealand were included in the World Rankings for the first time. In April 2025, New Zealand invited to compete at the 2026 World Cup as Asia-Pacific representatives. In September, New Zealand were announced as competitors in the inaugural NRL Wheelchair Championship.

== Results ==
Date	Score (Note: New Zealand score given first)	Opponent	Competition	Venue	Attendance	Ref.
1 November 2024	4–98	Australia	Two match series friendly	Eventfinda Stadium, Auckland		
4 November 2024	8–110	Australia	Two match series friendly	Eventfinda Stadium, Auckland		
31 October 2025	24–14	Queensland Reserves	2025 NRL Wheelchair Championship	Gold Coast Sports and Leisure Centre, Gold Coast		
31 October 2025	10–24	Queensland	2025 NRL Wheelchair Championship	Gold Coast Sports and Leisure Centre, Gold Coast		
1 November 2025	0–18	New South Wales	2025 NRL Wheelchair Championship	Gold Coast Sports and Leisure Centre, Gold Coast		
1 November 2025	18–22	Australian Capital Territory	2025 NRL Wheelchair Championship	Gold Coast Sports and Leisure Centre, Gold Coast		
1 November 2025	50–6	(Victoria (state)) Victoria	2025 NRL Wheelchair Championship	Gold Coast Sports and Leisure Centre, Gold Coast		
2 November 2025	36–6	(South Australia) (Western Australia) (Northern Territory) Affiliated States	2025 NRL Wheelchair Championship	Gold Coast Sports and Leisure Centre, Gold Coast		
10 July 2026	6–38	New South Wales	2026 NRL Wheelchair Championship	Gold Coast Sports and Leisure Centre, Gold Coast		
10 July 2026	12–40	North Queensland	2026 NRL Wheelchair Championship	Gold Coast Sports and Leisure Centre, Gold Coast		
11 July 2026	28–0	(South Australia) (Western Australia) (Northern Territory) Affiliated States	2026 NRL Wheelchair Championship	Gold Coast Sports and Leisure Centre, Gold Coast		
11 July 2026	44–0	(Victoria (state)) Victoria	2026 NRL Wheelchair Championship	Gold Coast Sports and Leisure Centre, Gold Coast		
10 July 2026	6–16	Australian Capital Territory	2026 NRL Wheelchair Championship	Gold Coast Sports and Leisure Centre, Gold Coast		
10 July 2026	14–24	Queensland	2026 NRL Wheelchair Championship	Gold Coast Sports and Leisure Centre, Gold Coast		
31 October 2026	14–102	Australia	2026 World Cup Group stage	WIN Entertainment Centre, Wollongong		
3 November 2026	10–120	France	2026 World Cup Group stage	WIN Entertainment Centre, Wollongong		
6 November 2026	18–62	Scotland	2026 World Cup Group stage	WIN Entertainment Centre, Wollongong		
9 November 2026	36–64	Wales	2026 World Cup Ranking semi-final	WIN Entertainment Centre, Wollongong		
12 November 2026	30–26	United States	2026 World Cup 7th-place play-off	WIN Entertainment Centre, Wollongong		

== Records and statistics ==
IRL Wheelchair World Rankings
Official rankings as of August 2026
Rank	Change	Team	Pts %
1	Steady	England	100
2	Steady	France	88
3	Steady	Ireland	67
4	Steady	Australia	64
5	Steady	Wales	43
6	Steady	Scotland	39
7	Steady	Spain	26
8	Steady	United States	22
9	Steady	New Zealand	5
10	Steady	Italy	0
Complete rankings at www.internationalrugbyleague.com
