= Tom Coyd =

English rugby league player and wheelchair rugby league coach

Tom Coyd MBE
Personal information
- Full name: Tom Coyd
- Born: 1995-1996 Kent, England, United Kingdom

Playing information
Club
| Years | Team | Pld | T | G | FG | P |
|---|---|---|---|---|---|---|
| – | Medway Dragons |

Coaching information
Club
| Years | Team | Gms | W | D | L | W% |
| –2025 | London Roosters |
| 2018–20 | England Wheelchair (assistant) |
| 2020– | England Wheelchair |
| | Total | 0 | 0 | 0 | 0 |
- As of 15 November 2026
Medals
Wheelchair rugby league (as head coach)
Representing England
World Cup
| Winner | 2021 England |
| Winner | 2026 Australia |

Tom Coyd is an English rugby league player and wheelchair rugby league coach. He plays for Medway Dragons in the London and South East Rugby League and is the head coach of London Roosters and the England national wheelchair rugby league team, in addition to being the head of England pathways.

In the King's 2023 Birthday Honours he was appointed Member of the Order of the British Empire for services to wheelchair rugby league football.

== Career ==
Tom Coyd's first coaching experience with the national side was in 2018 when he joined as an assistant coach. He was promoted to head coach in 2020. In November 2022 he led England to victory in the 2021 Wheelchair Rugby League World Cup final. Coyd was awarded an MBE for services to wheelchair rugby league in the King's 2023 Birthday Honours. At the 2023 Man of Steel Awards, Coyd was named the Wheelchair Super League Coach of the Year. At the 2023 UK Coaching Awards, he won the "Greatest Coaching Moment" award for sporting events between 1 November 2022 and 20 November 2023 with the World Cup victory, narrowly surpassing Sarina Wiegman's World Cup campaign with the England women's national football team which cumulated in the 2023 FIFA Women's World Cup final.

== Family ==
Tom Coyd's younger brother Joe is an England international who plays for London Roosters. Their father Martin was also an England international, and was one of the early pioneers of the sport in England.

== Honours ==
=== England (as head coach) ===
- World Cup:
  - Champions (2): 2021, 2026

=== Individual ===
- UK Coaching Awards: Greatest Coaching Moment (2023)
- Man of Steel Awards: Wheelchair Super League Coach of the Year (2023)

=== Orders ===
- Order of the British Empire:
  - MBE: 2023 (services to wheelchair rugby league football)
