= United States national wheelchair rugby league team =

United States
Team information
- Nickname: The Hawks
- Governing body: USA Rugby League
- Region: Europe
- Head coach: Geoff Mason
- Captain: Jesse Lind
- IRL ranking: 8 (August 21, 2026)

Team results
- First international
- United States 62–41 Scotland; Sheffield, England (November 4, 2022)
- Biggest win
- 62–41 v Scotland (November 4, 2022)
- Biggest defeat
- 0–134 v England (November 3, 2026)
- World Cup
- Appearances: 2 (first time in 2021)
- Best result: 3rd in group, 2021

The United States national wheelchair rugby league team represents the United States in wheelchair rugby league. The team, nicknamed the Hawks, is controlled by USA Rugby League, the governing body for rugby league in the United States. Formed in 2022, the team made its debut at the 2021 Wheelchair Rugby League World Cup finishing third in their group with one victory and two defeats.

In 2019 the organizers of the 2021 Wheelchair Rugby League World Cup announced the United States as one of the countries invited to participate in the tournament. At the time of the invite there was no national team, so Australian Geoff Mason, a former player, was recruited to form a team.

== History ==
=== 2021 World Cup ===
Following try-outs a squad of 11 domestically based players was chosen and flew to England for the Cup. The squad was captained by Jeff Townsend who had previously played wheelchair basketball and included just one non-disabled player, Micah Johnson. In England the squad was joined by Matthew Wooloff, a player based in the United Kingdom.

The team's first ever competitive match was against Scotland in Sheffield on November 4 with the US winning 62–41 with Mackenzie Johnson being named player of the match.

The second group match was against Wales with the US defeated 32–50 in a hard-fought game. The defeat left the US team with a chance of qualifying for the semi-finals but it would require Wales lose their last group game against Scotland while the US team would have to beat defending world champions and number 1 seeds, France.

The game against France was a one-sided affair as France ran in 21 tries to win 116–6 with Mackenzie Johnson scoring the only try for the US. Mackenzie Johnson was named in the RLWC2021 Wheelchair Team of the Tournament.

=== Hosting Wales ===
The team played its first matches at home in February 2024 when they hosted a two-match tour by Wales. Both matches were played at the Sports Center in Myrtle Beach, South Carolina. Wales won both matches.

=== 2026 World Cup ===
In April 2025, it was confirmed that the United States had qualified to compete at the 2026 World Cup.

== Results ==
Date	Score (Note: United States score given first)	Opponent	Competition	Ref.
November 4, 2022	62–41	Scotland	2021 World Cup Group stage	
November 7, 2022	32–50	Wales	2021 World Cup Group stage	
November 10, 2022	6–116	France	2021 World Cup Group stage	
February 2, 2024	24–78	Wales	Two match series friendly	
February 3, 2024	22–52	Wales	Two match series friendly	
October 30, 2026	10–110	Ireland	2026 World Cup Group stage	
November 3, 2026	0–134	England	2026 World Cup Group stage	
November 6, 2026	18–92	Wales	2026 World Cup Group stage	
November 9, 2026	12–44	Scotland	2026 World Cup Ranking semi-final	
November 12, 2026	26–30	New Zealand	2026 World Cup 7th-place play-off	

== Records ==
IRL Wheelchair World Rankings
Official rankings as of August 2026
Rank	Change	Team	Pts %
1	Steady	England	100
2	Steady	France	88
3	Steady	Ireland	67
4	Steady	Australia	64
5	Steady	Wales	43
6	Steady	Scotland	39
7	Steady	Spain	26
8	Steady	United States	22
9	Steady	New Zealand	5
10	Steady	Italy	0
Complete rankings at www.internationalrugbyleague.com

United States historical IRL Wheelchair World Rankings
	Dec 2022	Jun 2023	Dec 2023	Jun 2024	Dec 2024	Jun 2025	Nov 2025	Aug 2026
Ranking	8	8	8	7 (▲1)	8 (▼1)	8	8	8
References								
