= IRL Wheelchair World Rankings =

Ranking system for wheelchair national teams in rugby league

IRL Wheelchair World Rankings
Official rankings as of August 2026
Rank	Change	Team	Pts %
1	Steady	England	100
2	Steady	France	88
3	Steady	Ireland	67
4	Steady	Australia	64
5	Steady	Wales	43
6	Steady	Scotland	39
7	Steady	Spain	26
8	Steady	United States	22
9	Steady	New Zealand	5
10	Steady	Italy	0
Complete rankings at www.internationalrugbyleague.com

The IRL Wheelchair World Rankings are the ranking system for national teams in the sport of wheelchair rugby league football. The first rankings were published in June 2020.

== Ranking calculation method ==
The world rankings are calculated by International Rugby League using a points system based on the following criteria which are used for men's, women's and wheelchair teams:

- Match result: win, draw or loss
- Margin of victory or loss: a larger winning margin is worth more than a narrow win
- Opponent strength: playing higher ranked teams is of greater value than playing lower ranked teams
- Assessment period: all matches played (Note: Only officially sanctioned matches are included) over the current season and the three preceding seasons are included, using a weighting system in which more recent matches are of greater value
- Importance of match: World Cup matches are of greatest value, followed by World Cup qualifiers, (Note: Participation at the 2026 Wheelchair Rugby League World Cup is based on previous tournament results and application/invitation so, as with previous tournaments, no qualification matches have been played) regional championships and then one-off matches

== History ==
The first rankings were published in June 2020. Due to the impact of the COVID-19 pandemic on rugby league, the rankings remained unchanged over the following year until being updated in December 2021. In contrast to this, December 2022 saw a complete reordering of rankings as a result of the 2021 World Cup. This included England displacing France from the top position for the first time, and the addition of the United States following their début at the tournament. In December 2024, New Zealand featured in the rankings for the first time having made their début against Australia the previous month.

=== Historical rankings ===
Team	Jun 2020	Dec 2021	Jun 2022	Dec 2022	Jun 2023	Dec 2023	Jun 2024	Dec 2024	Jun 2025	Nov 2025	Aug 2026
Australia	4	4	7 (▼3)	3 (▲4)	4 (▼1)	4	3 (▲1)	4 (▼1)	4	4	4
England	2	2	2	1 (▲1)	1	1	1	1	1	1	1
France	1	1	1	2 (▼1)	2	2	2	2	2	2	2
Ireland	5	6 (▼1)	4 (▲2)	5 (▼1)	5	5	4 (▲1)	3 (▲1)	3	3	3
Italy	8	7 (▲1)	6 (▲1)	9 (▼3)	9	9	9	10 (▼1)	9 (▲1)	10 (▼1)	10
New Zealand	–	–	–	–	–	–	–	9	–	9	9
Scotland	6	5 (▲1)	5	6 (▼1)	6	6	6	6	6	6	6
Spain	7	8 (▼1)	8	7 (▲1)	7	7	8 (▼1)	7 (▲1)	7	7	7
United States	–	–	–	8	8	8	7 (▲1)	8 (▼1)	8	8	8
Wales	3	3	3	4 (▼1)	3 (▲1)	3	5 (▼2)	5	5	5	5
References:										(Note: At the end of December 2025 (when the Men's and Women's rankings were updated), the wheelchair rankings were unchanged as there were no wheelchair international fixtures played since the previous world rankings were issued in mid-November 2025)	

== See also ==
- RLIF Awards
- IRL Men's World Rankings
- IRL Women's World Rankings
