= Wales rugby team =

Wales rugby team can refer to the following -

== Rugby union ==
- Wales national rugby union team
  - Wales national under-20 rugby union team
  - Wales national under-18 rugby union team
  - Wales national rugby sevens team
  - Wales A national rugby union team
- Wales women's national rugby union team

== Rugby league ==
- Wales national rugby league team
- Wales women's national rugby league team
- Wales national wheelchair rugby league team
