= Rugby in Italy =

Rugby in Italy may refer to:

- Rugby league in Italy
- Rugby union in Italy
