= Jérémy Bourson =

France international wheelchair rugby league player

Personal information
- Full name: Jérémy Bourson
- Born: 3 August 1988 (age 38) France

Playing information
Club
Years	Team	Pld	T	G	FG	P
2017–	Catalans Dragons
2022; 2023; 2024	Halifax Panthers
	Total	0	0	0	0	0
Representative
Years	Team	Pld	T	G	FG	P
2019–	France

Jérémy Bourson is a French wheelchair rugby league player who currently plays for Catalans Dragons in Elite One Championship and the France national wheelchair rugby league team.

== Career ==
=== Club ===
Jérémy Bourson has been successful in multiple Elite One Championship campaigns with Catalans Dragons. In 2023, Bourson helped Catalans to win the inaugural European Club Challenge against UK champions Halifax after 32–32 draw resulted in a shared title. A few months later he helped Catalans secure their first Challenge Cup title after scoring in the final, with the club making their debut the UK competition the season prior. Bourson ended the year winning the IRL Wheelchair Golden Boot, receiving the award from the previous year's winner and Catalans teammate Seb Bechara. 2024 saw Catalans win the European Club Challenge outright, beating Wigan 68–28 with Bourson scoring five tries in the match. Catalans also retained the Challenge Cup in 2024, again beating Wigan in the final.

During the 2022, 2023, and 2024 French off season, Bourson played for Halifax. While at Halifax, he won the 2022 RFL Wheelchair Super League.

=== International ===
Jérémy Bourson represented France at the Wheelchair Rugby League World Cup in 2021 tournament, losing out to England in the final by a score of 24–28. Despite the final loss, he made team of the tournament.

== Honours ==
=== Catalans Dragons ===
- Elite 1:
  - Champions (5): 2017–18, 2018–19 2021–22, 2022–23, 2023–24
- Coupe de France:
  - Winners (1): 2017–18
- Challenge Cup:
  - Winners (2): 2023, 2024
- European Club Challenge:
  - Winners (2): 2023, 2024

=== Halifax ===
- Super League (and predecessor tournaments):
  - Champions (2): 2022

=== France ===
- World Cup:
  - Runner-up (1): 2021, 2026

=== Individual ===
- IRL Wheelchair Golden Boot
  - Winners (1): 2023
