= Rugby in Spain =

Rugby in Spain may refer to:

- Rugby union in Spain
- Rugby league in Spain
