= Ireland rugby team =

Ireland rugby team may refer to teams in the different codes of rugby football:

== Rugby union ==
- Ireland national rugby union team, administered by the Irish Rugby Football Union
- Ireland women's national rugby union team, administered by the Irish Rugby Football Union.
- Ireland national rugby sevens team, competes in the HSBC World Sevens Series
- Ireland women's national rugby sevens team, competes in the Women's Sevens Series

== Rugby league ==
- Ireland national rugby league team, administered by the Rugby League Ireland
- Ireland women's national rugby league team
- Ireland national wheelchair rugby league team
