= 2026 Wheelchair Rugby League World Cup =

Fifth staging of the Wheelchair Rugby League World Cup

- Number of teams: 8
- Host country: Australia
- Winner: England (3rd title)
- Matches played: 20
- Points scored: 2035 (101.75 per match)
- Tries scored: 364 (18.2 per match)
- Top scorer: (Australia) Bayley McKenna 120
- Top try scorer: (England) Rob Hawkins 21

The 2026 Wheelchair Rugby League World Cup will be the fifth staging of the Wheelchair Rugby League World Cup, and will be one of three major tournaments part of the 2026 Rugby League World Cup.

The competition was to be held in during October and November 2025, but was moved to 2026 following the withdrawal of France as hosts nation. The competition will run in parallel with the men's and women's tournaments.

Due to the rescheduling, the competition will feature 8 teams only. An expansion was planned to double the number of teams for the original 2025 tournament.

Ahead of the tournament, Australia and New Zealand were reclassified as Tier 2 nations for the wheelchair game by the International Rugby League in recognition of England's and France's domination of the sport since its inception.

== Host selection ==
The International Rugby League (IRL) originally decided in 2016 to have the tournaments hosted in the United States and Canada. In December 2019 however, the IRL withdrew the hosting rights due to the promoters, Moore Sports International, being unable to guarantee the staging of the tournaments.

After re-opening the bidding to host the tournaments, the IRL awarded the hosting rights to France. On 15 May 2023, the France 2025 organising committee was forced to withdraw from hosting the tournament, due to financial concerns from the new French government elected in May 2022.

On 3 August 2023 it was confirmed that the tournament would be moved to 2026 and held in the Southern Hemisphere. On 24 July 2024, the IRL announced that Australia would host the 2026 tournament.

== Teams ==
=== Qualification ===
On 3 August 2023, the date the tournament was confirmed, the only qualified teams for the 2026 tournament were the semi-finalists of the 2021 World Cup.

- Australia
- England
- France
- Wales

On 15 April 2025, the International Rugby League announced two further participants as representatives of The Americas and Asia-Pacific Rugby League respectively:

- United States
- New Zealand

The final four wheelchair rugby league nations, all being European Rugby League representatives, would have to submit applications for the final two places.

On 10 September 2025, the two successful European applicants were announced as:

- Ireland
- Scotland

The application process assessed teams based on senior international matches played since the 2021 World Cup, preparation for the 2026 World Cup, domestic competition strength, and participation impact for the 2026 World Cup.

=== Draw ===
The draw was announced on 23 November 2025.

Group A	Group B
England Ireland United States Wales	Australia France New Zealand Scotland

=== Squads ===
Note: Two players named Jack Brown played in the tournament, one for England and one for New Zealand.

==== Group A ====
===== England =====
Player	Club
Mason Billington	(England) London Roosters
Jack Brown	(England) Halifax Panthers
Nathan Collins	(England) Leeds Rhinos
Joe Coyd	(England) London Roosters
Luis Domingos	(England) Sheffield Eagles
Rob Hawkins	(England) Halifax Panthers
Chris Haynes	(England) Sheffield Eagles
Lewis King	(England) London Roosters
Tristan Norfolk	(England) Leeds Rhinos
Finlay O'Neill	(England) Halifax Panthers

===== Ireland =====
Player	Club (RLI)	Club (RFL) (Note: Rugby League Ireland operates a provincial competition in which both domestic and overseas players participate. RFL based players and some domestic players also play in Wheelchair Super League or Championship.)
Oran Spain	Leinster	(England) Wigan Warriors
Cian Horgan	Munster	(England) Halifax Panthers
Bledar Suxha	Leinster	N/A
Toby Burton-Carter	Leinster	(England) Wigan Warriors
Mel Griffith (vc)	Leinster	(England) Wigan Warriors
Tom Martin	Ulster	(England) Bradford Bulls
Phil Roberts	Connacht	(England) Wigan Warriors
Peter Johnston	Ulster	(England) Midlands Hurricanes
Joseph Calcott (c)	Connacht	(England) Halifax Panthers
James McCarthy	Munster	(England) Midlands Hurricanes
Maurice Noonan	Leinster	N/A
Jack Mangan	Munster	N/A

===== Wales =====
Player	Club (RFL)	Club (WRL) (Note: Wales Rugby League operates the Welsh Invitational League outside of the wider RFL system. This competition sees many Welsh athletes participate, in addition to playing with their RFL club that would contest the Wheelchair Super League or Championship. Some clubs like, North Wales Crusaders, participate in both league structures.)
Stuart Williams	(Scotland) Edinburgh Giants	North Wales Crusaders
Jodie Boyd-Ward	(England) Leeds Rhinos	N/A
Andrew Higgins	(England) Midlands Hurricanes	N/A
Lee Sargent	(England) Midlands Hurricanes	(Wales) Cardiff Blue Dragons
Jonathan Gill	North Wales Crusaders	
Fionn McCabe	North Wales Crusaders	
Martin Turner	North Wales Crusaders	
Gareth Ramsey	(England) Sheffield Eagles	N/A
Sid Ramsey	(England) Sheffield Eagles	N/A
Matthew Turner	(England) Wigan Warriors	North Wales Crusaders
Mark Williams	(England) Wigan Warriors	South Wales Jets
John Berriman	(England) York RLFC	N/A

===== United States =====
- Jesse Lind
- Austin Johnson
- Brent Hawkins
- Antoine Gray
- Frederick Smith III
- William Fox
- James Ross
- Eric Wooten
- Lavern Anderson Jr
- William Johnstone
- Andy Kingsley
- Jabrier Lee

==== Group B ====
===== Australia =====
Ahead of the World Cup, the 2026 NRL Wheelchair Championships were held on 10, 11, and 12 July 2026. An interstate challenge match was played on 6 September 2026.

Player	Championships Team
Bayley McKenna (C)	North Queensland Cowboys
Daniel Anstey	South East & Central Queensland
Peter Arbuckle	North Queensland Cowboys
Cory Cannane	New South Wales
Diab Karim	New South Wales
Liam Luff	New South Wales
Toby Popple	Australian Capital Territory
Stephan Rochecouste	New South Wales
Zac Schumacher	North Queensland Cowboys
Adam Tannock	North Queensland Cowboys

===== France =====
- Jérémy Bourson
- Gilles Clausells
- Nicolas Clausells
- Dany Denuwelaere
- Damien Doré
- Guillaume Dubruel
- Jorge Gelade Panzo
- Florian Guttadoro
- Jonathan Hivernat
- Léo Hivernat
- Adrien Zittel
- Thomas Duhalde

===== New Zealand =====
Ahead of the World Cup, New Zealand participated in the 2026 NRL Wheelchair Championships on 10, 11, and 12 July 2026.

- Jack Brown
- Ryan Charles
- Hayden Delves
- Nikia Fa’atau
- Joshua Hirini-Barclay
- Jayson Hooker (C)
- Kauri Murray (VC)
- Pele Sulusi
- Mitch Stone
- Jamie Tapp

===== Scotland =====
Player	Club
Alex Howe	(England) Widnes Vikings
Arran King	(Scotland) Edinburgh Giants
Calum Davidson	(Scotland) Edinburgh Giants
Calum Japes	(England) Castleford Tigers
David Hill	(Scotland) Edinburgh Giants
Hamish Douglas	(Scotland) Edinburgh Giants
James Simpson-Hill	(England) Leeds Rhinos
John Clarke	(Australia) Queensland
Mark Robertson	(Scotland) Edinburgh Giants
Max Owen	(England) London Roosters
Olivia Fulton	(Scotland) Edinburgh Giants
Sarah Devlin	(Scotland) Edinburgh Giants

== Venue ==
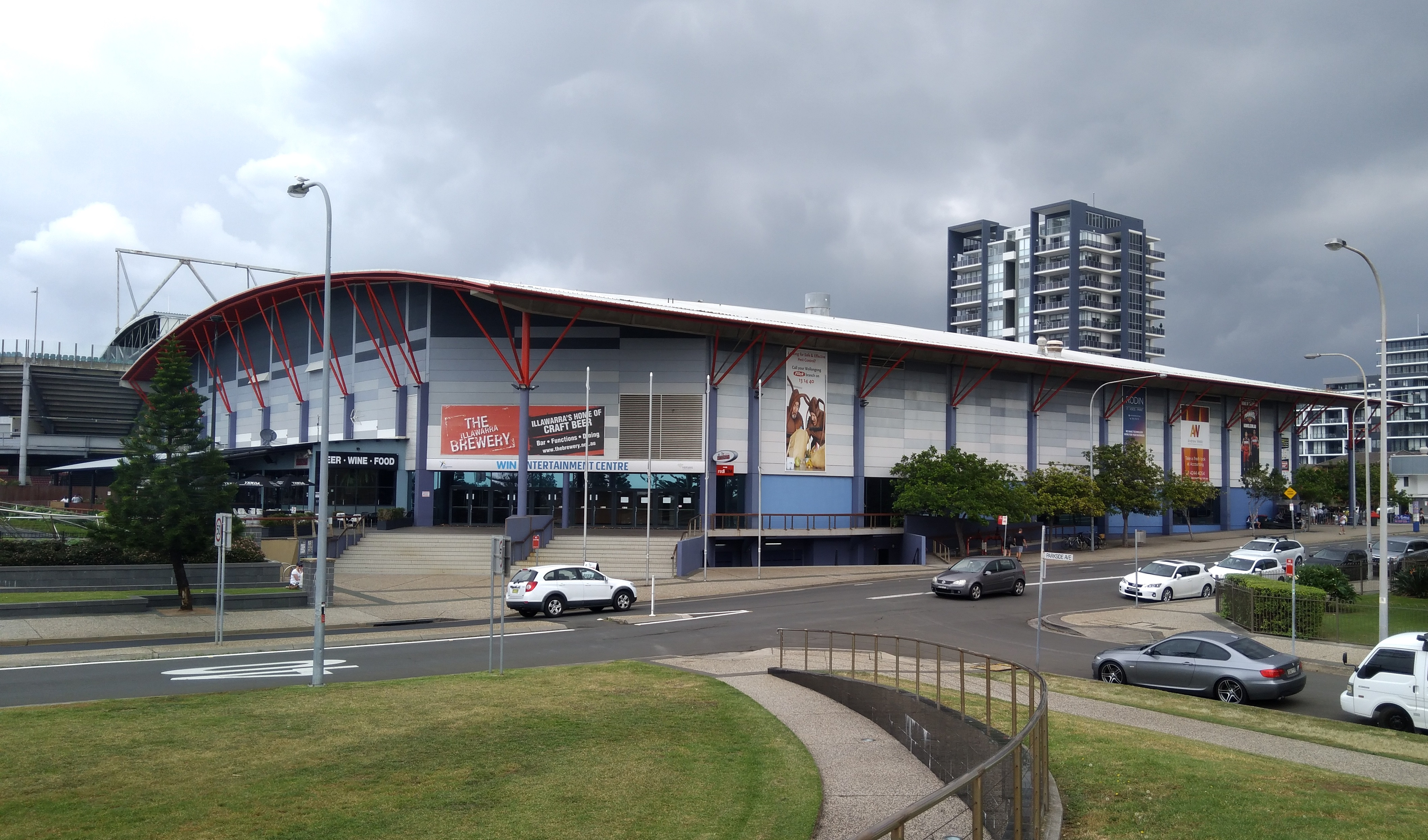
Wollongong Entertainment Centre

In November 2025, it was announced that all matches in the tournament would be held at the Wollongong Entertainment Centre.

== Officiating ==
The roles of match officials for Wheelchair rugby league differ to those used in men's and women's rugby league. The main referee and defensive referee officiate from the side-line. The in goal judges officiate from behind the dead ball line, one at each end.

Officials from several participating countries were appointed for the tournament.

Match Official	Country	Men's tournament appearances			
Match Official	Country	Main Referee	Defensive Referee	In Goal Judge	Total
Luke Anderson	Australia	0	2	5	7
Anthony Bishop	Australia	0	2	5	7
Laurent Bonnet	France	1	3	3	7
Jake Brook	England	3	1	3	7
Robert Burgin	Australia	1	1	7	9
Ollie Cruickshank	Scotland	2	2	2	6
Maxine Godinet	France	1	1	7	9
Steve Hewson	Australia	1	1	4	6
Tim Robinson	Australia	3	1	2	6
Stephane Vincent	France	2	3	0	5
Rebecca Whiteley	England	4	1	0	5
Karli Wilkinson	England	2	2	2	6

== Group stage ==
=== Group A ===
Pos	Team	Pld	W	D	L	PF	PA	PD	Pts	Qualification
1	England	3	3	0	0	300	50	+250	6	Advance to main semi-finals
2	Ireland	3	2	0	1	210	106	+104	4	Advance to main semi-finals
3	Wales	3	1	0	2	138	184	−46	2	Ranking semi-finals
4	United States	3	0	0	3	28	336	−308	0	Ranking semi-finals

Source: Source

30 October 2026
13:00 AEDT (UTC+11:00)

Ireland	110–10	United States
Tries: Calcott 5', 13', 25', 30', 37', 41', 45'; Horgan 9', 11', 17', 32', 34', 59'; Martin 65', 70', 75'; Burton-Carter 20', 22'; Johnston 79'; Goals: Horgan (1/1); Johnston (10/11); Roberts (5/6)	1st: 66–6; 2nd: 46–4; Report	Tries: Gray 2'; Lind 63'; Goals: Johnstone (1/2)

WIN Entertainment Centre, Wollongong
Attendance: 1,008
Referees: Ollie Cruickshank (Scotland), Stephane Vincent (France)
Player of the Match: Joseph Calcott (Ireland)

Team details
Ireland		Position	USA
Name	Number	Position	Number	Name
Cian Horgan	1	Starter	1	Jabrier Lee
Toby Burton-Carter	2	Starter	2	William Johnstone
Melanie Griffith	3	Starter	3	Mack Johnson
Peter Johnston	4	Starter	4	Andy Kingsley
Joseph Calcott	5	Starter	5	Jesse Lind
Tom Martin	6	Interchange	6	Freddie Smith III
Phil Roberts	7	Interchange	7	Cole Wooten
James Mccarthy	8	Interchange	8	Brent Hawkins
Jack Mangan	9	Reserve	9	Antoine Gray
Phil Roberts		Coach		Geoff Mason

30 October 2026
15:30 AEDT (UTC+11:00)

England	98–18	Wales
Tries: Collins 1', 25', 51', 79'; Hawkins 11', 14', 28', 32', 37', 41', 46', 54', 57', 62', 73'; Coyd 22'; Billington 60'; Brown 75'; Goals: Collins (9/12); Hawkins (4/6)	1st: 46–12; 2nd: 52–6; Report	Tries: Turner 10'; Ramsey 18', 70'; Goals: Turner (3/3)

WIN Entertainment Centre, Wollongong
Attendance: 1,008
Referees: Tim Robinson (Australia), Karli Wilkinson (England)
Player of the Match: Rob Hawkins (England)

Team details
England		Position	Wales
Name	Number	Position	Number	Name
Nathan Collins	1	Starter	1	Sid Ramsey
Rob Hawkins	2	Starter	2	Mark Williams
Joe Coyd	3	Starter	3	Jodie Boyd-Ward
Jack Brown	4	Starter	4	Stuart Williams
Lewis King	5	Starter	5	Matthew Turner
Fin O'Neil	6	Interchange	6	Fionn Mccabe
Mason Billington	7	Interchange	7	Jonathan Gill
Tristan Norfolk	8	Interchange	8	John Berriman
Luis Domingos	9	Reserve	9	Lee Sargent
Tom Coyd		Coach		Alan Caron

3 November 2026
16:00 AEDT (UTC+11:00)

Ireland	68–28	Wales
Tries: Horgan 3', 61', 64', 71'; Calcott 10', 28', 48', 51', 66', 76'; Martin 22'; Mangan 73'; Goals: Roberts (10/12)	1st: 20–12; 2nd: 48–16; Report	Tries: S Ramsey 6'; M Willams 33'; Higgins 41'; S Williams 45'; Turner 54'; Goals: Turner (4/5)

WIN Entertainment Centre, Wollongong
Referees: Jake Brook (England), Maxine Godinet (New Zealand)
Touch judges: Laurent Bonnet (France), Karli Wilkinson (England)
Player of the Match: Joseph Calcott (Ireland)

Team details
Ireland		Position	Wales
Name	Number	Position	Number	Name
Cian Horgan	1	Starter	1	Sid Ramsey
Melanie Griffith	2	Starter	2	Lee Sargent
Thomas Martin	3	Starter	3	Stuart Williams
Phil Roberts	4	Starter	4	Matthew Turner
Joseph Calcott	5	Starter	5	Jodie Boyd-Ward
Oran Spain	6	Interchange	6	Andrew Higgins
Jack Mangan	7	Interchange	7	Jonathan Gill
Maurice Noonan	8	Interchange	8	Mark Williams
Toby Burton-Carter	9	Reserve	9	Gareth Ramsey
Phil Roberts		Coach		Alan Caron

3 November 2026
18:30 AEDT (UTC+11:00)

England	134–0	United States
Tries: Norfolk 1', 9', 18'; Domingos 3', 22', 67', 76'; Haynes 13', 16', 57', 74'; Billington 30', 39', 48', 53'; O'Neil 32', 41'; Brown 51', 71', 78'; King 60'; Coyd 63', 69'; Goals: O'Neil (15/16); Coyd (6/7)	1st: 58–0; 2nd: 76–0; Report

WIN Entertainment Centre, Wollongong
Referees: Ollie Cruickshank (Scotland), Steve Hewson (Australia)
Touch judges: Robert Burgin, Luke Anderson
Player of the Match: Finlay O'Neill (England)

Team details
England		Position	USA
Name	Number	Position	Number	Name
Fin O'Neil	1	Starter	1	Antoine Gray
Luis Domingos	2	Starter	2	Jesse Lind
Tristan Norfolk	3	Starter	3	Jabrier Lee
Chris Haynes	4	Starter	4	Brent Hawkins
Mason Billington	5	Starter	5	Andy Kingsley
Joe Coyd	6	Interchange	6	Freddie Smith III
Lewis King	7	Interchange	7	Cole Wooten
Jack Brown	8	Interchange	8	Morrell Fox
Nathan Collins	9	Reserve	9	William Johnstone
Tom Coyd		Coach		Geoff Mason

6 November 2026
13:30 AEDT (UTC+11:00)

Wales	92–18	United States
Tries: Berriman 2', 15', 18', 55'; Higgins 5', 31'; McCabe 9', 29', 71'; Williams 22', 47'; Gill 26', 62', 77'; Turner 29'; Ramsey 38', 42'; Goals: Higgins (10/10); Turner (2/2)	1st: 54–0; 2nd: 38–18; Report	Tries: Johnson 40', 53'; Gray 50'; Goals: Johnstone (3/3)

WIN Entertainment Centre, Wollongong
Attendance: 1,192
Referees: Karli Wilkinson (England), Luke Anderson (Australia)
Touch judges: Maxine Godinet (New Zealand), Steve Hewson (Australia)
Player of the Match: Andrew Higgins (Wales)

Team details
Wales		Position	USA
Name	Number	Position	Number	Name
Fionn McCabe	1	Starter	1	Andy Kingsley
Andrew Higgins	2	Starter	2	Mack Johnson
Jonathan Gill	3	Starter	3	Jabrier Lee
Stuart Williams	4	Starter	4	Brent Hawkins
John Berriman	5	Starter	5	Antoine Gray
Lee Sargent	6	Interchange	6	Freddie Smith III
Gareth Ramsey	7	Interchange	7	Jesse Lind
Matthew Turner	8	Interchange	8	Morrell Fox
Martin Turner	9	Reserve	9	William Johnstone
Alan Caron		Coach		Geoff Mason

6 November 2026
17:00 AEDT (UTC+11:00)

England	68–32	Ireland
Tries: King 19', 30'; Coyd 28', 45', 52', 62'; Hawkins 34', 43', 48'; Billington 60', 68'; Brown 74'; Goals: O'Neil (1/1); Collins (9/9)	1st: 22–20; 2nd: 46–12; Report	Tries: Johnston 4'; Burton-Carter 16'; Spain 22'; Calcott 72'; Mangan 78'; Goals: Spain (1/1); Johnston (4/4)

WIN Entertainment Centre, Wollongong
Attendance: 1,192
Referees: Stephane Vincent (France), Laurent Bonnet (France)
Touch judges: Anthony Bishop (Australia), Jake Brook (England)
Player of the Match: Joe Coyd (England)

Team details
England		Position	Ireland
Name	Number	Position	Number	Name
Fin O'Neil	1	Starter	1	Joseph Calcott
Rob Hawkins	2	Starter	2	Oran Spain
Tristan Norfolk	3	Starter	3	Melanie Griffith
Jack Brown	4	Starter	4	Jack Mangan
Lewis King	5	Starter	5	Peter Johnston
Nathan Collins	6	Interchange	6	Toby Burton-Carter
Mason Billington	7	Interchange	7	Thomas Martin
Joe Coyd	8	Interchange	8	James McCarthy
Chris Haynes	9	Reserve	9	Maurice Noonan
Tom Coyd		Coach		Phil Roberts

=== Group B ===
Pos	Team	Pld	W	D	L	PF	PA	PD	Pts	Qualification
1	France	3	3	0	0	303	44	+259	6	Advance to main semi-finals
2	Australia (H)	3	2	0	1	240	107	+133	4	Advance to main semi-finals
3	Scotland	3	1	0	2	86	236	−150	2	Ranking semi-finals
4	New Zealand	3	0	0	3	42	284	−242	0	Ranking semi-finals

Source: Source
(H) Hosts

31 October 2026
15:00 AEDT (UTC+11:00)

France	114–0	Scotland
Tries: Bourson 4', 16', 36', 43', 48', 52', 67'; Zittel 9', 46', 57', 61'; Clausells 13', 20'; J. Hivernat 28', 30', 32', 38', 78'; L. Hivernat 38'; Guttadoro 69'; Goals: Clausells (2/2); Bourson (2/2); L. Hivernat (6/6); J. Hivernat (7/7)	1st: 62–0; 2nd: 52–0; Report

WIN Entertainment Centre, Wollongong
Attendance: 1,216
Referees: Rebecca Whiteley (England), Robert Burgin (Australia)
Touch judges: Maxine Godinet (France), Anthony Bishop (Australia)
Player of the Match: Jérémy Bourson (France)

Team details
France		Position	Scotland
Name	Number	Position	Number	Name
Gilles Clausells	1	Starter	1	Oliva Fulton
Guillaume Dubruel	2	Starter	2	Calum Davidson
Jérémy Bourson	3	Starter	3	Aaron King
Adrien Zittel	4	Starter	4	Alex Howe
Leo Hivernat	5	Starter	5	David Hill
Florian Guttadoro	6	Interchange	6	Hamish Douglas
Jonathan Hivernat	7	Interchange	7	Calum Japes
Jorge Gelade Panzo	8	Interchange	8	Mark Robertson
Dany Denuwaelere	9	Reserve	9	John Clarke
Cyril Torres		Coach		Martyn Gill

31 October 2026
17:30 AEDT (UTC+11:00)

Australia	112–14	New Zealand
Tries: Karim 1', 15', 52'; Anstey 5', 17', 75'; Mckenna 11', 21', 60', 73'; Tannock 19', 41', 56'; Cannane 33'; Schumacher 64', 69'; Luff 71', 78'; Goals: McKenna (15/18)	1st: 48–10; 2nd: 64–4; Report	Tries: Fa'atau 26', 48'; Sulusi 35'; Goals: Hirini-Barclay (1/3)

WIN Entertainment Centre, Wollongong
Attendance: 1,216
Referees: Laurent Bonnet (France), Jake Brook (England)
Touch judges: Luke Anderson (Australia), Steve Hewson (Australia)
Player of the Match: Bayley McKenna (Australia)

Team details
Australia		Position	New Zealand
Name	Number	Position	Number	Name
Daniel Anstey	1	Starter	1	Jayson Hooker
Cory Cannane	2	Starter	2	Nikia Fa'atau
Diab Karim	3	Starter	3	Ryan Charles
Bayley McKenna	4	Starter	4	Pele Sulusi
Zac Schumacher	5	Starter	5	Mitch Stone
Peter Arbuckle	6	Interchange	6	Jack Brown
Liam Luff	7	Interchange	7	Joshua Hirini-Barclay
Adam Tannock	8	Interchange	8	Kauri Murray
Toby Popple	9	Reserve	9	Jamie Tapp
Brett Clark		Coach		Edie George

3 November 2026
11:00 AEDT (UTC+11:00)

France	120–10	New Zealand
Tries: Gelade Panzo 1', 67', 73', 79'; Bourson 3', 6', 23', 39', 70', 76'; Denuwaelere 9', 19', 31', 33', 59'; N Clausells 27', 35', 38', 57'; Dore 49'; Zittel 55' Goals: Guttadoro (8/8); N Clausells (8/8)	1st: 74–0; 2nd: 56–10; Report	Tries: Murray 45'; Fa'atau 62'; Goals: Charles (1/2)

WIN Entertainment Centre, Wollongong
Referees: Tim Robinson (Australia), Anthony Bishop (Australia)
Touch judges: Laurent Bonnet (France), Karli Wilkinson (England)
Player of the Match: Jérémy Bourson (France)

Team details
France		Position	New Zealand
Name	Number	Position	Number	Name
Gilles Clausells	1	Starter	1	Ryan Charles
Damien Dore	2	Starter	2	Nikia Fa'Atau
Florian Guttadoro	3	Starter	3	Jayson Hooker
Jérémy Bourson	4	Starter	4	Pele Sulusi
Adrien Zittel	5	Starter	5	Kauri Murray
Nicolas Clausells	6	Interchange	6	Joshua Hirini-Barclay
Dany Denuwaelere	7	Interchange	7	Dan Scott
Jorge Gelade Panzo	8	Interchange	8	Jack Brown
Guillaume Dubruel	9	Reserve	9	Mitch Stone
Cyril Torres		Coach		Edie George

3 November 2026
13:30 AEDT (UTC+11:00)

Australia	104–24	Scotland
Tries: Schumacher 6', 13', 66', 72'; Tannock 9', 15', 31', 45', 51', 61'; Anstey 11', 43'; Karim 21', 64', 68'; McKenna 33', 40', 57'; Cannane 79'; Goals: Cannane (1/1); Karim (3/3); McKenna (10/10)	1st: 44–12; 2nd: 60–12; Report	Tries: Simpson-Hill 19'; Davidson 27'; Douglas 70'; Owen 77'; Goals: Douglas (1/1); Davidson (3/3)

WIN Entertainment Centre, Wollongong
Referees: Stephane Vincent (France), Rebecca Whiteley (England)
Touch judges: Robert Burgin (Australia), Luke Anderson (Australia)
Player of the Match: Adam Tannock (Australia)

Team details
Australia		Position	Scotland
Name	Number	Position	Number	Name
Peter Arbuckle	1	Starter	1	John Clarke
Daniel Anstey	2	Starter	2	David Hill
Liam Luff	3	Starter	3	Aaron King
Cory Cannane	4	Starter	4	Max Owen
Diab Karim	5	Starter	5	Sarah Devlin
Bayley Mckenna	6	Interchange	6	Oliva Fulton
Zac Schumacher	7	Interchange	7	Hamish Douglas
Adam Tannock	8	Interchange	8	James Simpson-Hill
Toby Popple	9	Reserve	9	Alex Howe
Brett Clark		Coach		Martyn Gill

6 November 2026
11:00 AEDT (UTC+11:00)

Scotland	62–18	New Zealand
Tries: Douglas 1'; Davidson 7', 39', 45', 60'; Hill 24'; Simpson-Hill 27', 79'; Owen 34', 55', 72'; Goals: Davidson (7/16); Douglas (2/2)	1st: 32–12; 2nd: 30–6; Report	Tries: Fa'atau 10'; Hirini-Barclay 18'; Brown 66'; Goals: Hirini-Barclay (3/3)

WIN Entertainment Centre, Wollongong
Attendance: 1,192
Referees: Jake Brook (England), Tim Robinson (Australia)
Touch judges: Anthony Bishop (Australia), Robert Burgin (Australia)
Player of the Match: Calum Davidson (Scotland)

Team details
Scotland		Position	New Zealand
Name	Number	Position	Number	Name
Calum Davidson	1	Starter	1	Jayson Hooker
James Simpson-Hill	2	Starter	2	Nikia Fa'Atau
David Hill	3	Starter	3	Joshua Hirini-Barclay
Oliva Fulton	4	Starter	4	Kauri Murray
Hamish Douglas	5	Starter	5	Pele Sulusi
Aaron King	6	Interchange	6	Jack Brown
Max Owen	7	Interchange	7	Ryan Charles
Sarah Devlin	8	Interchange	8	Mitch Stone
Calum Japes	9	Reserve	9	Jamie Tapp
Martyn Gill		Coach		Edie George

6 November 2026
19:30 AEDT (UTC+11:00)

France	69–34	Australia
Tries: Dore 2'; Denuwaelere 11', 13', 34'; Gelade Panzo 29'; N Clausells 40', 79'; Bourson 48'; G Clausells 51', 66'; Guttadoro 56'; Hivernat 63'; Goals: Guttadoro (3/4); Hivernat (1/1); N Clausells (6/6); Drop goals: G Clausells (1/1)	1st: 30–22; 2nd: 39–12; Report	Tries: Anstey 15'; Tannock 19',78'; McKenna 23'; Karim 38'; Schumaker 44'; Goals: McKenna (4/4); Karim (1/1)

WIN Entertainment Centre, Wollongong
Attendance: 1,192
Referees: Rebecca Whiteley (England), Ollie Cruickshank (Scotland)
Touch judges: Maxine Godinet (France), Robert Burgin (Australia)
Player of the Match: Gilles Clausells (France)

Team details
France		Position	Australia
Name	Number	Position	Number	Name
Damien Dore	1	Starter	1	Cory Cannane
Florian Guttadoro	2	Starter	2	Bayley Mckenna
Jérémy Bourson	3	Starter	3	Zac Schumacher
Dany Denuwaelere	4	Starter	4	Adam Tannock
Jorge Gelade Panzo	5	Starter	5	Daniel Anstey
Gilles Clausells	6	Interchange	6	Peter Arbuckle
Jonathan Hivernat	7	Interchange	7	Liam Luff
Nicolas Clausells	8	Interchange	8	Diab Karim
Adrien Zittel	9	Reserve	9	Toby Popple
Cyril Torres		Coach		Brett Clark

== Knockout stage ==
=== Ranking finals ===
==== Ranking bracket ====
Ranking semi-finals
9 November – Wollongong
Scotland	44
United States	12
9 November – Wollongong
Wales	64
New Zealand	36

5th/6th play-off
12 November – Wollongong
Scotland	30
Wales	52
7th/8th play-off
12 November – Wollongong
United States	26
New Zealand	30

==== Ranking semi-finals ====
9 November 2026
11:00 AEDT (UTC+11:00)

Wales	64–36	New Zealand
Tries: S Williams 1', 17', 52', 56', 75'; Higgins 9', 65'; Turner 23'; Boyd-Ward 68', 70'; M Williams 73'; Goals: Higgins(9/10); Turner (1/1)	1st: 24–24; 2nd: 40–12; Report	Tries: Fa'atau 5'; Charles 19'; Murray 26'; Hirini-Barclay 37',62'; Tapp 47'; Goals: Charles (4/4); Hirini-Barclay (2/2)

WIN Entertainment Centre, Wollongong
Attendance: 700
Referees: Maxine Godinet, Laurent Bonnet
Touch judges: Anthony Bishop, Tim Robinson (Australia)
Player of the Match: Stuart Williams (Wales)

Team details
Wales		Position	New Zealand
Name	Number	Position	Number	Name
Fionn McCabe	1	Starter	1	Ryan Charles
Andrew Higgins	2	Starter	2	Jayson Hooker
Jodie Boyd-Ward	3	Starter	3	Dan Scott
Stuart Williams	4	Starter	4	Kauri Murray
Mark Williams	5	Starter	5	Nikia Fa'Atau
Sid Ramsey	6	Interchange	6	Jack Brown
Jonathan Gill	7	Interchange	7	Joshua Hirini-Barclay
Matthew Turner	8	Interchange	8	Jamie Tapp
Martin Turner	9	Reserve	9	Pele Sulusi
Alan Caron		Coach		Edie George

9 November 2026
13:30 AEDT (UTC+11:00)

Scotland	44–12	United States
Tries: King 6', 9'; Davidson 18'; Devlin 27'; Howe 36', 71'; Calum Japes 56', 77'; Goals: Davidson (4/5); Robertson (2/3)	1st: 28–6; 2nd: 16–6; Report	Tries: Johnson 3'; Gray 74'; Goals: Hawkins (2/2)

WIN Entertainment Centre, Wollongong
Attendance: 700
Referees: Robert Burgin, Karli Wilkinson (England)
Touch judges: Steve Hewson (Australia), Ollie Cruickshank (Scotland)
Player of the Match: Arran King (Scotland)

Team details
Scotland		Position	USA
Name	Number	Position	Number	Name
Calum Davidson	1	Starter	1	Mack Johnson
Aaron King	2	Starter	2	Jesse Lind
Max Owen	3	Starter	3	Jabrier Lee
Sarah Devlin	4	Starter	4	Brent Hawkins
John Clarke	5	Starter	5	Antoine Gray
Oliva Fulton	6	Interchange	6	Freddie Smith III
Calum Japes	7	Interchange	7	Cole Wooten
Mark Robertson	8	Interchange	8	William Johnstone
Alex Howe	9	Reserve	9	Andy Kingsley
Martyn Gill		Coach		Geoff mason

==== Seventh place play-off ====
12 November 2026
11:00 AEDT (UTC+11:00)

New Zealand	30—26	United States
	1st: 20–16; 2nd: 10–10; Source

WIN Entertainment Centre, Wollongong
Referees: Steve Hewson (Australia), Anthony Bishop
Touch judges: Laurent Bonnet (France), Jake Brook
Player of the Match: Nikia Fa'atau (New Zealand)

==== Fifth place play-off ====
12 November 2026
13:30 AEDT (UTC+11:00)

Wales	52—30	Scotland
	1st: 28–10; 2nd: 24–20; Source

WIN Entertainment Centre, Wollongong
Referees: Karli Wilkinson (England), Luke Anderson
Touch judges: Robert Burgin, Maxine Godinet
Player of the Match: Fionn McCabe (Wales)

=== Main finals ===
==== Main bracket ====
Semi-finals
10 November – Wollongong
France	82
Ireland	26
10 November – Wollongong
England	86
Australia	18

Final
13 November – Wollongong
France	38
England	50
Third place
13 November – Wollongong
Ireland	24
Australia	70

==== Semi-finals ====
10 November 2026
17:15 AEDT (UTC+11:00)

France	82–26	Ireland
Tries: L Hivernat 5'; J Hivernat 14'; Dore 18', 43', 46', 52', 59'; N Clausells 20'; Denuwaelere 32', 39', 42', 51', 60', 66'; G Clausells 57'; Goals: L Hivernat (3/5); N Clausells (8/10)	1st: 32–14; 2nd: 50–12; Report	Tries: Johnston 11'; Horgan 21', 62'; Mangan 36'; Calcott 69'; Goals: Horgan (0/1); Johnston (0/1); Spain (3/3)

WIN Entertainment Centre, Wollongong
Referees: Rebecca Whiteley (England), Stephane Vincent (France)
Touch judges: Jake Brook (England), Luke Anderson (Australia)
Player of the Match: Dany Denuwelaere (France)

Team details
France		Position	Ireland
Name	Number	Position	Number	Name
Gilles Clausells	1	Starter	1	Joseph Calcott
Damien Dore	2	Starter	2	Melanie Griffith
Leo Hivernat	3	Starter	3	Cian Horgan
Nicolas Clausells	4	Starter	4	Peter Johnson
Jonathan Hivernat	5	Starter	5	Jack Mangan
Adrien Zittel	6	Interchange	6	Oran Spain
Dany Denuwaelere	7	Interchange	7	Toby Burton-Carter
Guillaume Dubruel	8	Interchange	8	Thomas Martin
Jorge Gelade Panzo	9	Reserve	9	Phil Roberts
Cyril Torres		Coach		Phil Roberts

10 November 2026
19:45 AEDT (UTC+11:00)

England	86–18	Australia
Tries: Billington 3', 33', 35'; Hawkins 9', 13', 53', 57', 63'; Joe Coyd 17', 23'; Brown 41', 46'; Collins 49'; Haynes 70'; King 74'; Goals: Hawkins (5/5); Collins (8/10)	1st: 40–6; 2nd: 46–12; Report	Tries: Karim 28', 60'; Anstey 66'; Goals: McKenna (3/3)

WIN Entertainment Centre, Wollongong
Referees: Tim Robinson (Australia), Ollie Cruickshank (Scotland)
Touch judges: Maxine Godinet (France), Robert Burgin (Australia)
Player of the Match: Mason Billington (England)

Team details
England		Position	Australia
Name	Number	Position	Number	Name
Joe Coyd	1	Starter	1	Adam Tannock
Rob Hawkins	2	Starter	2	Bayley Mckenna
Tristan Norfolk	3	Starter	3	Daniel Anstey
Lewis King	4	Starter	4	Cory Cannane
Mason Billington	5	Starter	5	Zac Schumacher
Nathan Collins	6	Interchange	6	Peter Arbuckle
Chris Haynes	7	Interchange	7	Liam Luff
Jack Brown	8	Interchange	8	Diab Karim
Fin O'Neil	9	Reserve	9	Toby Popple
Tom Coyd		Coach		Brett Clark

==== Third place play-off ====
13 November 2026
17:15 AEDT (UTC+11:00)

Ireland	24–70	Australia
Tries: Horgan 8'; Spain 50'; Calcott 54'; Mangan 62'; Johnston 69'; Goals: Johnston (1/3); Spain (1/2)	1st: 4–40; 2nd: 20–30; Report	Tries: Cannane 1'; Popple 3', 6'; Karim 11', 26'; Anstey 13', 41', 44'; McKenna 29', 75', 78'; Luff 72'; Goals: Karim (4/5); McKenna (7/7)

WIN Entertainment Centre, Wollongong
Referees: Jake Brook (England), Laurent Bonnet (France)
Touch judges: Maxine Godinet (France), Robert Burgin (Australia)
Player of the Match: Daniel Anstey (Australia)

==== Final ====
13 November 2026
19:45 AEDT (UTC+11:00)

England	50–38	France
Tries: Coyd 4', 7', 31', 57'; Hawkins 35', 43'; Brown 39', 62', 69'; Goals: Hawkins (1/2); Collins (6/7)	1st: 28–22; 2nd: 22–16; Report	Tries: Bourson 11'; L Hivernat 19'; Doré 22'; Guttadoro 27'; Denuwelaere 41', 60', 79'; Goals: L Hivernat (3/4); N Clausells (2/3)

WIN Entertainment Centre, Wollongong
Referees: Rebecca Whiteley (England), Stephane Vincent (France)
Touch judges: Tim Robinson (Australia), Ollie Cruickshank (Scotland)
Player of the Match: Joe Coyd (England)

Team details
England		Position	France
Name	Number	Position	Number	Name
Joe Coyd	1	Starter	1	Jonathan Hivernat
Rob Hawkins	2	Starter	2	Damien Dore
Tristan Norfolk	3	Starter	3	Florian Guttadoro
Lewis King	4	Starter	4	Jeremy Bourson
Mason Billington	5	Starter	5	Leo Hivernat
Nathan Collins	6	Interchange	6	Gilles Clausells
Luis Domingos	7	Interchange	7	Dany Denuwaelere
Jack Brown	8	Interchange	8	Jorge Gelade Panzo
Fin O'Neil	9	Reserve	9	Nicolas Clausells
Tom Coyd		Coach		Cyril Torres

== Team of the tournament ==
Six days after the final, the team of the tournament was announced.

Player	Position	Team
Joe Coyd	Fullback	England
Rob Hawkins	Wing	England
Bayley McKenna	Centre	Australia
Jérémy Bourson	Centre	France
Dany Denuwelaere	Wing	France
Joseph Calcott	interchange	Ireland
Jack Brown	interchange	England
Adam Tannock	interchange	Australia
Nicolas Clausells	interchange	France

== Statistics ==
=== Most tries in the tournament ===
Qualification: 4 tries

As of the conclusion of the tournament

Rank	Player	Team	Tries
1	Rob Hawkins	England	21
2	Joseph Calcott	Ireland	16
3	Jérémy Bourson	France	14
3	Dany Denuwelaere	France	14
5	Joe Coyd	England	13
5	Cian Horgan	Ireland	13
7	Stuart Williams	Wales	12
8	Diab Karim	Australia	11
8	Bayley McKenna	Australia	11
8	Adam Tannock	Australia	11
11	Daniel Anstey	Australia	10
11	Mason Billington	England	10
11	Jack Brown	England	10
14	Nicolas Clausells	France	7
14	Calum Davidson	Scotland	7
14	Damien Dore	France	7
14	Nikia Fa'atau	New Zealand	7
14	Andrew Higgins	Wales	7
14	Jonathan Hivernat	France	7
14	Zac Schumacher	Australia	7
21	Antoine Gray	United States	6
22	John Berriman	Wales	5
22	Gilles Clausells	France	5
22	Nathan Collins	England	5
22	Jorge Gelade Panzo	France	5
22	Chris Haynes	England	5
22	Joshua Hirini-Barclay	New Zealand	5
22	Mackenzie Johnson	United States	5
22	Jack Mangan	Ireland	5
22	Fionn McCabe	Wales	5
22	Adrien Zittel	France	5
32	Luis Domingos	England	4
32	Peter Johnston	Ireland	4
32	Lewis King	England	4
32	Arran King	Scotland	4
32	Tom Martin	Ireland	4
32	Max Owen	Scotland	4

Note: Two players named Jack Brown played in the tournament. Jack Brown of England scored 10 tries. Jack Brown of New Zealand scored 3 tries.

=== Most tries in a match ===
Qualification: 5 tries in a match

As of the conclusion of the tournament

Player	Team	Tries	Times	Date	Round	Opponent	Ref
Rob Hawkins	England	11	6' 14' 28' 32' 37'; 41' 46' 54' 57' 62' 73'	30 Oct 2026	1	Wales	NRL
Joseph Calcott	Ireland	7	5' 13' 25' 30' 37'; 41' 45'	30 Oct 2026	1	United States	NRL
Jérémy Bourson	France	7	4' 16' 36'; 43' 48' 52' 67'	31 Oct 2026	1	Scotland	NRL
Jérémy Bourson	France	6	3' 6' 23' 39'; 70' 76'	3 Nov 2026	2	New Zealand	NRL
Cian Horgan	Ireland	6	9'11' 17' 32' 34'; 59'	30 Oct 2026	1	United States	NRL
Joseph Calcott	Ireland	6	10' 28'; 48' 51' 66' 76'	3 Nov 2026	2	Wales	NRL
Adam Tannock	Australia	6	9' 15' 31'; 45' 51' 61'	3 Nov 2026	2	Scotland	NRL
Dany Denuwelaere	France	6	31' 38'; 41' 50' 59' 65'	10 Nov 2026	SF	Ireland	NRL
Jonathan Hivernat	France	5	28' 30' 32' 38' 78'	31 Oct 2026	1	Scotland	NRL
Dany Denuwelaere	France	5	9' 19' 31' 33' 59'	3 Nov 2026	1	New Zealand	NRL
Stuart Williams	Wales	5	0' 17' 52' 56' 75'	9 Nov 2026	RSF	New Zealand	NRL
Damien Dore	France	5	17' 43' 45' 52' 58'	10 Nov 2026	SF	Ireland	NRL
Rob Hawkins	England	5	9' 13' 53' 57' 63'	10 Nov 2026	SF	Australia	NRL

=== Most points ===
Qualification: 20 points

As of the conclusion of the tournament

Rank	Player	Team	Tries	Goals	DG	Points
1	Bayley McKenna	Australia	11	38	0	120
2	Robert Hawkins	England	21	10	0	104
3	Nathan Collins	England	5	32	0	84
4	Andrew Higgins	Wales	7	25	0	78
5	Nicolas Clausells	France	7	22	0	72
6	Joseph Calcott	Ireland	16	0	0	64
6	Joe Coyd	England	13	6	0	64
8	Calum Davidson	Scotland	7	17	0	62
9	Jeremy Bourson	France	14	2	0	60
9	Diab Karim	Australia	11	8	0	60
11	Dany Denuwelaere	France	14	0	0	56
12	Cian Horgan	Ireland	13	1	0	54
13	Stuart Williams	Wales	12	0	0	48
14	Peter Johnston Jnr	Ireland	4	15	0	46
15	Jonathan Hivernat	France	7	8	0	44
15	Adam Tannock	Australia	11	0	0	44
17	Daniel Anstey	Australia	10	0	0	40
17	Mason Billington	England	10	0	0	40
17	Jack Brown	England	10	0	0	40
17	Finlay O'Neill	England	2	16	0	40
21	Florian Guttadoro	France	3	11	0	34
21	Joshua Hirini-Barclay	New Zealand	5	7	0	34
23	Matthew Turner	Wales	3	10	0	32
24	Phil Roberts	Ireland	0	15	0	30
24	Zac Schumacher	Australia	7	1	0	30
26	Damien Dore	France	7	0	0	28
26	Nikia Fa'atau	New Zealand	7	0	0	28
28	Leo Hivernat	France	2	9	0	26
29	Gilles Clausells	France	5	2	1	25
30	Antoine Gray	United States	6	0	0	24
31	John Berriman	Wales	5	0	0	20
31	Jorge Gelade Panzo	France	5	0	0	20
31	Chris Haynes	England	5	0	0	20
31	Mackenzie Johnson	United States	5	0	0	20
31	Jack Mangan	Ireland	5	0	0	20
31	Fionn McCabe	Wales	5	0	0	20
31	Adrien Zittel	France	5	0	0	20

== See also ==
- 2026 Men's Rugby League World Cup
- 2026 Women's Rugby League World Cup
