= Australia national wheelchair rugby league team =

Australia
Team information
- Nickname: Wheelaroos
- Region: Asia-Pacific
- IRL ranking: 4 (21 August 2026)

Team results
- First international
- England 34–26 Australia; Sydney, Australia (7 November 2008)
- Biggest win
- Australia 148–0 Scotland; Gillingham, England (3 July 2013)
- Biggest defeat
- France 102–12 Australia; Nanterre, France (29 June 2013)
- World Cup
- Appearances: 5 (first time in 2008)
- Best result: 2nd, 2008

The Australia national wheelchair rugby league team represent Australia in wheelchair rugby league. The team have played at all four World Cup tournaments and were finalists in the inaugural competition in 2008.

== History ==
Wheelchair rugby league was introduced to Australia in 2004 when a French team travelled to Sydney, Australia. Four matches were played with each side winning twice as the Australians won the series on points difference. In 2006, wheelchair rugby league was given official recognition by the Rugby League International Federation.

In 2008, Australia was one of four teams that competed in the first Wheelchair Rugby League World Cup. It took place in Sydney, as part of the Festival of World Cups, which was held as a build-up event for the 2008 Rugby League World Cup. Australia defeated France 22–20 in the semi-final before losing 44–12 to England in the final. At the 2013 World Cup, Australia won their opening match 148–0 against Scotland. They lost to England in the semi-finals and finished fourth in the tournament after a narrow 16–14 defeat to Wales in the third-place play-off match.

The 2017 World Cup was intended to be part of the Festival of World Cups which was hosted by Australia in Sydney, but in late 2016 the wheelchair tournament was moved to France. To enable the Australian team to take part they received A$50,000 from the NRL towards their transport costs. Australia reached the semi-finals but were again defeated by England. Australia finished their campaign with a 58–45 win over Italy in the third-place play-off. In 2019, Australia hosted an England tour in which the two teams played a two-match Ashes Test series. A Wheelaroo Tour (Note: the wheelchair rugby league equivalent of a Kangaroo Tour) to England in October 2020 was planned but did not take place. At the 2021 World Cup, Australia reached the semi-finals where they lost 84–40 to France. In August 2023, it was announced that Australia were to play the United States in a three-match series in Las Vegas in 2024, however, the series was cancelled in November 2023. A proposed tour to Australia by France was also cancelled. In November 2024, Australia played a two-match series against New Zealand in Auckland. Australia achieved a 2–0 series win over the Wheel Kiwis who were making their international début.

== Current squad ==
The Australia squad for the 2026 Wheelchair Rugby League World Cup.

Player
Bayley McKenna (C)
Daniel Anstey
Peter Arbuckle
Cory Cannane
Diab Karim
Liam Luff
Toby Popple
Stephan Rochecouste
Zac Schumacher
Adam Tannock

== Competitive record ==
World Cup Record
Year	Finish
(Australia) 2008	Runners-up
(England) 2013	4th place
(France) 2017	3rd place
(England) 2021	Semi-finalist
(Australia) 2026	3rd place

=== Results ===
Date	Score (Note: Australia score given first)	Opponent	Competition	Venue	Attendance	Ref.
7 November 2008	26–34	England	2008 World Cup Group stage	Sydney Academy of Sport, Narrabeen		
10 November 2008	14–44	France	2008 World Cup Group stage	Betts Stadium, Sydney		
12 November 2008	88–0	Barbarians (Note: The Barbarians/Pacific Islands were a replacement team due to New Zealand withdrawing from the 2008 World Cup)	2008 World Cup Group stage	Sydney Academy of Sport, Narrabeen		
14 November 2008	22–20	France	2008 World Cup Semi-final	Whitlam Centre, Sydney		
17 November 2008	12–44	England	2008 World Cup Final	Betts Stadium, Sydney		
29 June 2013	12–102	France	2013 World Cup warm-up match	Centre Sportif du Mont-Valérien, Nanterre		
3 July 2013	148–0	Scotland	2013 World Cup Group stage	Medway Park, Gillingham		
6 July 2013	16–25	Wales	2013 World Cup Group stage	Medway Park, Gillingham		
9 July 2013	6–72	France	2013 World Cup Group stage	Medway Park, Gillingham		
11 July 2013	10–81	England	2013 World Cup Semi-final	Medway Park, Gillingham		
13 July 2013	14–16	Wales	2013 World Cup 3rd/4th play-off	Medway Park, Gillingham		
18 July 2017	16–70	France	2017 World Cup warm-up match	Gymnase L'Olympie, Limoux		
20 July 2017	72–24	Wales	2017 World Cup Group stage	Halle aux Sport, Carcassonne		
22 July 2017	22–102	France	2017 World Cup Group stage	Complexe La Rijole, Pamiers		
24 July 2017	26–80	England	2017 World Cup Group stage	Gymnase du Lac, Saint-Jory		
25 July 2017	49–40	Spain	2017 World Cup Group play-offs	Gymnase du Cosec, Albi		
26 July 2017	24–76	England	2017 World Cup Semi-final	Gymnase Compans Cafferlli, Toulouse		
27 July 2017	58–45	Italy	2017 World Cup 3rd/4th play-off	Gymnase du Cosec, St-Orens		
21 October 2019	28–84	England	Ashes Test series	Whitlam Leisure Centre, Sydney		
23 October 2019	50–58	England	Ashes Test series	University of Wollongong, Wollongong		
26 October 2022	?–?	British Army	2021 World Cup warm-up matches	Medway Park, Gillingham		
29 October 2022	86–38	Wales	2021 World Cup warm-up matches	Cardiff Met University Cyncoed Campus, Cardiff		
31 October 2022	129–1	Scotland	2021 World Cup warm-up matches	Medway Park, Gillingham		
3 November 2022	8–38	England	2021 World Cup Group stage	Copper Box, London	3,033	
6 November 2022	76–18	Ireland	2021 World Cup Group stage	Copper Box, London	3,268	
9 November 2022	52–32	Spain	2021 World Cup Group stage	Copper Box, London	3,847	
13 November 2022	40–84	France	2021 World Cup Semi-final	English Institute of Sport, Sheffield	1,318	
1 November 2024	98–4	New Zealand	Two match series friendly	Eventfinda Stadium, Auckland		
4 November 2024	110–8	New Zealand	Two match series friendly	Eventfinda Stadium, Auckland		
30 October 2025	28–56	England	Ashes Test series	Gold Coast Sports and Leisure Centre, Gold Coast		
2 November 2025	42–48	England	Ashes Test series	Gold Coast Sports and Leisure Centre, Gold Coast		
31 October 2026	102–14	New Zealand	2026 World Cup Group stage	WIN Entertainment Centre, Wollongong		
3 November 2026	104–24	Scotland	2026 World Cup Group stage	WIN Entertainment Centre, Wollongong		
6 November 2026	34–69	France	2026 World Cup Group stage	WIN Entertainment Centre, Wollongong		
10 November 2026	18–86	England	2026 World Cup semi-final	WIN Entertainment Centre, Wollongong		
13 November 2026	70–24	Ireland	2026 World Cup 3rd/4th play-off	WIN Entertainment Centre, Wollongong		

== Records and statistics ==
IRL Wheelchair World Rankings
Official rankings as of August 2026
Rank	Change	Team	Pts %
1	Steady	England	100
2	Steady	France	88
3	Steady	Ireland	67
4	Steady	Australia	64
5	Steady	Wales	43
6	Steady	Scotland	39
7	Steady	Spain	26
8	Steady	United States	22
9	Steady	New Zealand	5
10	Steady	Italy	0
Complete rankings at www.internationalrugbyleague.com

Australia historical IRL Wheelchair World Rankings
	Jun 2020	Dec 2021	Jun 2022	Dec 2022	Jun 2023	Dec 2023	Jun 2024	Dec 2024	Jun 2025	Nov 2025	Aug 2026
Ranking	4	4	7 (▼3)	3 (▲4)	4 (▼1)	4	3 (▲1)	4 (▼1)	4	4	4
References											

- Biggest win: 148–0 v. Scotland (3 July 2013)
- Biggest defeat: 12–102 v. France (29 June 2013)
