= Federazione Italiana Rugby League =

Governing body of rugby league in Italy

- Founded: January 2008
- RLEF affiliation: March 2017 (full member)
- Responsibility: Italy
- Website: www.firl.it

(Italy)

The Federazione Italiana Rugby League is the governing body for the sport of rugby league football in Italy. The association was formed in 2008. They acquired full membership status of the RLEF in March 2017. and of the RLIF in November 2017.

In 2024, the body was downgraded to affiliate member of the IRL (previously the RLIF) due to noncompliance with the full membership criteria.

== See also ==
- Rugby league in Italy
- Italian Rugby League Championship
- Italy national rugby league team
- Italy women's national rugby league team
