= Wheelchair Rugby League European Championship =

Wheelchair Rugby League World European Championship
- Sport: Rugby league
- Founded: 2015; 11 years ago
- No. of teams: 5
- Region: Europe
- Most recent champion: England (2015)
- Most titles: England

The Wheelchair Rugby League European Championship is an international wheelchair rugby league football tournament for European national teams first held in 2015 as a one off, but in 2022 the European Rugby League announced plans for it to become a regular competition.

== History ==
A Wheelchair Rugby League European Championship was held in 2015 as a one off competition with England winning 28–24 against France. Following the 2021 World Cup, the ERL announced plans for a Wheelchair Rugby League European Championship to be held in conjunction with the revamped Men's Rugby League European Championship and the newly formed Women's Rugby League European Championship.

== Results ==
Season	Champions	Final Score	Runners-up	Teams
2015; Details	England	28–24	France	5
TBA; Details	TBA	TBA	TBA	TBA

=== 2015 ===
Pos	Team	Pld	W	D	L	PF	PA	PD	Pts	FRA	ENG	SCO	IRE	WAL
1	France	4	4	0	0	266	43	+223	8		26–24	88–6	100–8	52–5
2	England	4	3	0	1	248	50	+198	6			102–0	66–16	56–8
3	Scotland	4	2	0	2	64	231	−167	4				32–16	25–24
4	Ireland	4	1	0	3	86	234	−148	2					46–36
5	Wales	4	0	0	4	74	180	−106	0					

3rd place play-off

26 September

Scotland	16–20	Ireland

Medway Park, Gillingham

Final

26 September

France	24–28	England

Medway Park, Gillingham

== See also ==
- Men's Rugby League European Championship
- Women's Rugby League European Championship
