= Scotland national wheelchair rugby league team =

Wheelchair Rugby League

Scotland
Team information
- Governing body: Scotland Rugby League
- Region: Europe
- Head coach: Martyn Gill
- IRL ranking: 6 (21 August 2026)

Team results
- First international
- Wales 20–6 Scotland; Hull, England (7 July 2012)
- World Cup
- Appearances: 4 (first time in 2013)
- Best result: 6th of 8, 2026

The Scotland national wheelchair rugby league team represents Scotland in wheelchair rugby league. They have competed at the World Cup, the European Championships and several tournaments within the British Isles, such as the Celtic Cup and Four Nations competitions.

== History ==
In July 2012 Scotland took part their first international competition, the Four Nations, a round-robin tournament between England, Ireland, Scotland and Wales. The tournament was held as part of preparations for the world cup taking place the following year. At the 2013 World Cup Scotland finished sixth after suffered heavy defeats against Australia and France in their group matches and losing twice to Ireland who they played in an inter-group match and the fifth-place play-off. Scotland recorded their first win in 2014 against Wales in the Four Nations. In 2015 Scotland played Ireland in the first Celtic Cup which was contested over two matches but became an annual three-team round robin with the addition of Wales in 2016. At the European Championships in 2015 Scotland started well with wins over Ireland and Wales. They came third in the group table but ended in fourth place after losing a play-off against Ireland. Scotland finished 7th at the 2017 World Cup after losses to Italy and Spain. In April 2019 Scotland defeated Ireland 52–42 in the Celtic Cup to record their first win since 2015. At the 2021 World Cup Scotland failed to progress from the group stage after losses to the United States, France and Wales.

== Squad ==
Scotland squad for 2026 Celtic Cup
First team squad	Coaching staff
Calum Davidson – Edinburgh Giants; Sarah Devlin – Edinburgh Giants; Hamish Douglas – Edinburgh Giants; Olivia Fulton – Edinburgh Giants; David Hill – Edinburgh Giants; Calum Japes – Castleford Tigers; Arran King – Edinburgh Giants; Max Owen – London Roosters; Mark Robertson – Edinburgh Giants; James Simpson-Hill – UK Armed Forces	Head coach: Martyn Gill; Assistant coach: James Simpson-Hill; Legend: (c) Captain(s); (vc) Vice-captain(s); Updated: 23 May 2026; Source(s):

== Competitive record ==
=== World Cup ===
World Cup Record
Year	Finish
(Australia) 2008	Did not enter
(England) 2013	6th
(France) 2017	7th
(England) 2021	Group stage
(Australia) 2026	6th

=== Celtic Cup ===
Celtic Cup results by year: Scotland
Opponent \ Year	2015	2016	2017	2018	2019	2020	2021	2022	2023	2024	2025	2026
Ireland	L-L	D	L	L	W	–	L	L	L	L	L	L
Wales	x	L	L	L	L	–	L	L	L	W	L	L
Finish:	2	3	3	3	2	–	3	3	3	2	3	3

Notes:
- 2015: Wales did not take part – Ireland and Scotland played each other twice
- 2020: The tournament was cancelled in 2020

=== Results ===
Date	Score (Note: Scotland score given first)	Opponent	Competition	Ref.
7 July 2012	6–20	Wales	2012 Four Nations	
8 July 2012	0–50	England	2012 Four Nations	
8 July 2012	8–14	Ireland	2012 Four Nations	
3 July 2013	0–148	Australia	2013 World Cup Group stage	
6 July 2013	2–154	France	2013 World Cup Group stage	
9 July 2013	6–26	Ireland	2013 World Cup Group stage	
13 July 2013	14–36	Ireland	2013 World Cup 5th-place play-off	
13 September 2014	14–104	England	2014 Four Nations	
13 September 2014	34–14	Wales	2014 Four Nations	
14 September 2014	10–60	Ireland	2014 Four Nations	
18 April 2015	28–52	Ireland	2015 Celtic Cup	
25 May 2015	48–80	Ireland	2015 Celtic Cup	
24 September 2015	26–25	Wales	2015 European Championship Group stage	
24 September 2015	32–16	Ireland	2015 European Championship Group stage	
25 September 2015	6–88	France	2015 European Championship Group stage	
26 September 2015	0–102	England	2015 European Championship Group stage	
26 September 2015	16–20	Ireland	2015 European Championship 3rd-place play-off	
30 April 2016	58–58	Ireland	2016 Celtic Cup	
30 April 2016	22–92	Wales	2016 Celtic Cup	
24 September 2016	10–90	England	2016 Four Nations	
24 September 2016	28–41	Wales	2016 Four Nations	
24 September 2016	24–62	Exiles (Note: The Exiles were a mix of Irish, Welsh and English players as Ireland were unable to travel with a full side to the 2016 Four Nations)	2016 Four Nations	
25 September 2016	26–29	Exiles	2016 Four Nations	
29 April 2017	16–26	Ireland	2017 Celtic Cup	
29 April 2017	0–71	Wales	2017 Celtic Cup	
20 July 2017	6–110	Italy	2017 World Cup Group stage	
22 July 2017	18–54	Spain	2017 World Cup Group stage	
28 April 2018	41–112	Wales	2018 Celtic Cup	
28 April 2018	36–68	Ireland	2018 Celtic Cup	
27 April 2019	10–102	Wales	2019 Celtic Cup	
27 April 2019	52–42	Ireland	2019 Celtic Cup	
28 September 2019	12–90	Wales	2019 Tri-Nations	
28 September 2019	1–136	England	2019 Tri-Nations	
12 June 2021	32–52	Ireland	2021 Celtic Cup	
12 June 2021	18–102	Wales	2021 Celtic Cup	
30 October 2021	34–70	Wales	International	
7 May 2022	35–38	Ireland	2022 Celtic Cup	
7 May 2022	6–116	Wales	2022 Celtic Cup	
18 June 2022	22–52	Ireland	International	
31 October 2022	1–129	Australia	International	
4 November 2022	41–62	United States	2021 World Cup Group stage	
7 November 2022	15–80	France	2021 World Cup Group stage	
10 November 2022	36–70	Wales	2021 World Cup Group stage	
18 June 2023	24–58	Ireland	2023 Celtic Cup	
18 June 2023	30–76	Wales	2023 Celtic Cup	
8 June 2024	34–68	Ireland	2024 Celtic Cup	
8 June 2024	64–52	Wales	2024 Celtic Cup	
24 May 2025	54–62	Wales	2025 Celtic Cup	
24 May 2025	20–92	Ireland	2025 Celtic Cup	
18 October 2025	6–58	Ireland	International	
23 May 2026	40–70	Ireland	2026 Celtic Cup	
23 May 2026	46–50	Wales	2026 Celtic Cup	
31 October 2026	0–114	France	2026 World Cup Group stage	
3 November 2026	24–104	Australia	2026 World Cup Group stage	
6 November 2026	62–18	New Zealand	2026 World Cup Group stage	
9 November 2026	44–12	United States	2026 World Cup Ranking semi-final	
12 November 2026	30–52	Wales	2026 World Cup 5th-place play-off	

== Records and rankings ==
IRL Wheelchair World Rankings
Official rankings as of August 2026
Rank	Change	Team	Pts %
1	Steady	England	100
2	Steady	France	88
3	Steady	Ireland	67
4	Steady	Australia	64
5	Steady	Wales	43
6	Steady	Scotland	39
7	Steady	Spain	26
8	Steady	United States	22
9	Steady	New Zealand	5
10	Steady	Italy	0
Complete rankings at www.internationalrugbyleague.com

Scotland historical IRL Wheelchair World Rankings
	Jun 2020	Dec 2021	Jun 2022	Dec 2022	Jun 2023	Dec 2023	Jun 2024	Dec 2024	Jun 2025	Nov 2025	Aug 2026
Ranking	6	5 (▲1)	5	6 (▼1)	6	6	6	6	6	6	6
References											

- Biggest win: 34–14 v. Wales (13 September 2014)
- Biggest defeat: 2–154 v. France (6 July 2013)
