= France national wheelchair rugby league team =

Team representing France in Wheelchair Rugby League

France
Team information
- Governing body: French Rugby League Federation
- Region: Europe
- IRL ranking: 2 (21 August 2026)

Team results
- World Cup
- Appearances: 5 (first time in 2008)
- Best result: Winners (2013, 2017)

The France national wheelchair rugby league team represents France in wheelchair rugby league. The team have played in all four World Cup tournaments, finishing third in the inaugural competition in 2008 tournament before finishing as champions in both 2013 and 2017. They finished as runners-up in 2021 and also finished runners-up in the 2015 European Rugby League Championship.

In May 2021, International Rugby League classified wheelchair rugby league in France as having Tier 1 status under its eligibility rules.

== Current squad ==
Squad selected for July 2026 fixtures against Ireland.

- Lionel Alazard (Montauban Pandas)
- Jérémy Bourson (Catalans Dragons)
- Gilles Clausells (Catalans Dragons)
- Nicolas Clausells (Catalans Dragons)
- Thibaud Dananchy (Decines RL)
- Dany Denuwelaere (Stade Toulousain Olympique St Jory)
- Damien Doré (Catalans Dragons)
- William Drouard (Stade Toulousain Olympique St Jory)
- Guillaume Dubruel (Stade Toulousain Olympique St Jory)
- Jorge Gelade Panzo (Catalans Dragons)
- Florian Guttadoro (SO Avignon XIII)
- Jonathan Hivernat (Catalans Dragons)
- Léo Hivernat (Catalans Dragons)
- Julien Pennella (Aingirak Euskadi)
- Jérôme Seixas (Montauban Pandas)
- Adrien Zittel (SO Avignon XIII)

== Competitive record ==
World Cup Record
Year	Finish
(Australia) 2008	Third Place
(England) 2013	Champions
(France) 2017	Champions
(England) 2021	Runners-up
(Australia) 2026	Runners-up

=== Results ===
Date	Score (Note: France score given first)	Opponent	Competition	Venue	Attendance	Ref.
3 June 2006	20–6	(United Kingdom) Great Britain	Friendly	CREPS Centre, Bourges		
2007	?–?	England	Friendly	Harrow, London		
7 November 2008	108–0	Barbarians (Note: The Barbarians/Pacific Islands were a replacement team due to New Zealand withdrawing from the 2008 World Cup)	2008 Rugby League World Cup Group Stage	Sydney Academy of Sport, Narrabeen		
10 November 2008	44–14	Australia	2008 Rugby League World Cup Group Stage	Mount Druitt, Sydney		
12 November 2008	18–26	England	2008 Rugby League World Cup Group Stage	Sydney Academy of Sport, Narrabeen		
14 November 2008	20–22	Australia	2008 Rugby League World Cup Semi Final	Whitlam Centre, Sydney		
17 November 2008	52–0	Barbarians	2008 Rugby League World Cup 3rd/4th play-off	Mount Druitt, Sydney		
28 August 2009	38–36	England	Friendly	Brunel University, London		
16 October 2010	44–34	England	Friendly	Cahors	1,060	
8 October 2011	32–34	England	Friendly	Leigh Sports Village, Leigh		
27 August 2012	43–22	England	Friendly: Fassolette-Kielty Trophy	Medway Park, Gillingham	700	
29 June 2013	102–12	Australia	2013 World Cup warm-up match	Centre Sportif du Mont-Valérien, Nanterre		
3 July 2013	28–20	England	2013 Rugby League World Cup Group Stage	Medway Park, Gillingham		
6 July 2013	154–2	Scotland	2013 Rugby League World Cup Group Stage	Medway Park, Gillingham		
9 July 2013	72–6	Australia	2013 Rugby League World Cup Group Stage	Medway Park, Gillingham		
11 July 2013	71–30	Wales	2013 Rugby League World Cup Semi Final	Medway Park, Gillingham		
13 July 2013	42–40	England	2013 Rugby League World Cup Final	Medway Park, Gillingham		
9 May 2014	64–46	England	Friendly: Fassolette-Kielty Trophy	Kindarena, Rouen	2,700	
23 September 2015	26–56	England	Friendly: Fassolette-Kielty Trophy	Medway Park, Gillingham		
24 September 2015	26–24	England	2015 Rugby League European Championship Group Stage	Medway Park, Gillingham		
25 September 2015	52–5	Wales	2015 Rugby League European Championship Group Stage	Medway Park, Gillingham		
25 September 2015	100–8	Ireland	2015 Rugby League European Championship Group Stage	Medway Park, Gillingham		
25 September 2015	88–6	Scotland	2015 Rugby League European Championship Group Stage	Medway Park, Gillingham		
26 September 2015	24–28	England	2015 Rugby League European Championship Final	Medway Park, Gillingham		
18 July 2017	70–16	Australia	Friendly	Gymnase L'Olympie, Limoux		
20 July 2017	71–31	England	2017 Rugby League World Cup Group Stage	Halle aux Sport, Carcassonne		
22 July 2017	102–22	Australia	2017 Rugby League World Cup Group Stage	Complexe La Rijole, Pamiers		
24 July 2017	118–10	Wales	2017 Rugby League World Cup Group Stage	Gymnase du Lac, Saint-Jory		
25 July 2017	98–6	Italy	2017 Rugby League World Cup Semi Final	Gymnase Compans Cafferlli, Toulouse		
28 July 2017	38–34	England	2017 Rugby League World Cup Final	Parc des Expositions, Perpignan		
21 June 2019	25–31	England	Two match series friendly: Fassolette-Kielty Trophy	Gymnase M. Guigou, Apt		
23 June 2019	50–46	England	Two match series friendly: Fassolette-Kielty Trophy	Palais des Sports de Toulon		
10 November 2021	49–24	England	Two match series friendly: Fassolette-Kielty Trophy	Medway Park, Gillingham		
13 November 2021	39–26	England	Two match series friendly: Fassolette-Kielty Trophy	Medway Park, Gillingham		
19 June 2022	48–62	England	Friendly: Fassolette-Kielty Trophy	National Basketball Centre, Manchester		
3 September 2022	108–4	Spain	Friendly	Fitou		
4 November 2022	104–6	Wales	2021 Rugby League World Cup Group Stage	English Institute of Sport, Sheffield	1,129	
7 November 2022	80–15	Scotland	2021 Rugby League World Cup Group Stage	English Institute of Sport, Sheffield	1,200	
10 November 2022	116–6	United States	2021 Rugby League World Cup Group Stage	English Institute of Sport, Sheffield	1,129	
13 November 2022	84–40	Australia	2021 Rugby League World Cup Semi Final	English Institute of Sport, Sheffield	1,318	
18 November 2022	24–28	England	2021 Rugby League World Cup final	Manchester Central, Manchester	4,526	
5 November 2023	43–34	England	Two match series friendly: Fassolette-Kielty Trophy	Leeds Arena, Leeds	2,373	
25 November 2023	18–34	England	Two match series friendly: Fassolette-Kielty Trophy	Palais des Sports, Marseille		
26 October 2024	33–66	England	Friendly: Fassolette-Kielty Trophy	Robin Park Arena, Wigan		
21 November 2024	62–20	Ireland	Friendly	CREPS des Pays de Loire, Nantes		
23 November 2024	32–28	England	Friendly: Fassolette-Kielty Trophy	Saint-Lô	~2,000	
11 July 2026	106–16	Ireland	Friendly	Halle Marcel Cerdan, Perpignan		
12 July 2026	66–36	Ireland	Friendly	Halle Marcel Cerdan, Perpignan		
31 October 2026	114–0	Scotland	2026 Rugby League World Cup Group stage	WIN Entertainment Centre, Wollongong		
3 November 2026	120–10	New Zealand	2026 Rugby League World Cup Group stage	WIN Entertainment Centre, Wollongong		
6 November 2026	69–34	Australia	2026 Rugby League World Cup Group stage	WIN Entertainment Centre, Wollongong		
10 November 2026	82–26	Ireland	2026 Rugby League World Cup semi-final	WIN Entertainment Centre, Wollongong		
13 November 2026	38–50	England	2026 Rugby League World Cup Final	WIN Entertainment Centre, Wollongong		

== Records and statistics ==
IRL Wheelchair World Rankings
Official rankings as of August 2026
Rank	Change	Team	Pts %
1	Steady	England	100
2	Steady	France	88
3	Steady	Ireland	67
4	Steady	Australia	64
5	Steady	Wales	43
6	Steady	Scotland	39
7	Steady	Spain	26
8	Steady	United States	22
9	Steady	New Zealand	5
10	Steady	Italy	0
Complete rankings at www.internationalrugbyleague.com

France historical IRL Wheelchair World Rankings
	Jun 2020	Dec 2021	Jun 2022	Dec 2022	Jun 2023	Dec 2023	Jun 2024	Dec 2024	Jun 2025	Nov 2025	Aug 2026
Ranking	1	1	1	2 (▼1)	2	2	2	2	2	2	2
References											

== Honours ==
- World Cup (2): (2013, 2017)
- Fassolette-Kielty Trophy: 7 Titles

== See also ==
- Rugby league in France
- France men's national rugby league team
- France women's national rugby league team
- French Rugby League Federation
