= Medway Dragons =

English amateur rugby league club

- Dragon

Club information
- Full name: Medway Dragons Rugby League Football Club
- Nickname: Dragons
- Short name: Medway
- Colours: Blood and gold
- Founded: 30 November 2007; 18 years ago
- Website: medwaydragons

Current details
- Ground: The Garrison Stadium, Sally Port Gardens, Gillingham
- Coach: Martin Coyd
- Competition: RLC London & South

Medway Dragons are a rugby league club based in Gillingham, Kent. They compete in the London & The South Competitions.

== History ==
Medway Dragons were founded on the evening of Friday 30 November 2007 at a meeting of 12 men in the, now re-purposed, Roseneath public house in Arden Street, Gillingham. The original plan for two teams at Under 11 and Under 13 was soon surpassed with five teams in the first season.

The primary objective of the club is to provide playing and volunteering opportunities for all in the community. As well as the Primary, Junior and Men's sections, the club operate Masters and Wheelchair teams. For a period of time, the club also ran Handball and Netball sections.

Medway Dragons launched an open-age team in 2011 and joined the London & South Division of the Rugby League Conference finishing sixth.

In 2012, the team finished 3rd in the South East Regional League of the Rugby League Conference, reaching the play-offs for the first time ever. They were beaten in the semi-final play-offs by Southampton Spitfires 32–14.

In 2013, Dragons finished top of the South East Regional League, before defeating Sussex Merlins 88–6 in the semi-final play-offs. In the Grand Final on Saturday 17 August, Medway Dragons played United Services Portsmouth Navy Seahawks at Medway Park Sports Centre and were defeated 22–27.

The Dragons announced former London Broncos head coach, Rob Powell, as head coach with a plan to become semi-professional and join the Championship One being the only Kent side to play professional rugby league since Kent Invicta.

This period brought huge improvement to the playing standards of the senior teams in the club and Medway Dragons with the First Grade (under Rob Powell) and Under 17 (under Martin Coyd) winning Premierships in 2014 and 2016 respectively. In 2014, the First Grade went on to beat Cornish Rebels before falling at the semi Final stage to London Chargers in the National Harry Jepson Trophy.

In 2021, Medway Dragons were crowned as Champions of The London Premier League as they beat Brixton Bulls 38–18 in the final on 18 September.

In 2023, Medway Dragons won the Harry Jepson Trophy overcoming the Midlands Champions Telford Raiders 46-30 on Saturday 16 September at Hemel Hempstead.

== Juniors ==
Medway Dragons' juniors take part in the London Junior League.

== Wheelchair team ==
In 2015, the wheelchair rugby league team competed in the Challenge Cup and lost to Halifax in the first round. Medway reached the semi-finals in 2016 and 2017 and were knocked out in the quarter-finals of the 2018 competition.
