= Ireland national wheelchair rugby league team =

Ireland

Team information
- Governing body: Rugby League Ireland
- Region: Europe
- Head coach: Phil Roberts
- IRL ranking: 3 (21 August 2026)

Team results
- First international
- England 34–12 Ireland; Hull, England (7 July 2012)
- World Cup
- Appearances: 3 (first time in 2013)
- Best result: 4th, 2026

The Ireland national wheelchair rugby league team represents Ireland in wheelchair rugby league. They have competed at the World Cup, the European Championships, the Celtic Cup and Four Nations competitions.

== History ==
In July 2012 Ireland took part in their first international competition, the Four Nations, a round-robin tournament between England, Ireland, Scotland and Wales. The tournament was held as part of preparations for the world cup taking place the following year. At the 2013 World Cup Ireland lost their matches against Wales and England. A win against Scotland was not enough to progress to the semi-finals, but they defeated Scotland in a play-off to take fifth place. Ireland finished second at the 2014 Four Nations. In 2015 Ireland played Scotland in the first Celtic Cup which was contested over two matches but became an annual three-team round-robin with the addition of Wales in 2016. At the 2015 European Championships their only group stage win was against Wales, but with a play-off win over Scotland they took third place in the tournament. In 2016 Ireland were unable to travel with a full team for the Four Nations so their place was filled by a mixed team of Irish, Welsh and English players known as the Exiles. At the 2021 World Cup Ireland were not initially selected to take part but were brought in to replace Norway who had withdrawn from the tournament. Ireland were knocked out at the group stage after losses to Spain and Australia before suffering a record defeat (0–121) in their final match against England. In June 2024, the Celtic Cup was played in Galway. This was the first time the tournament had been played in Ireland and it was won by the hosts who won both of their matches. In 2025, Ireland retained the Celtic Cup and set a new record for their largest win with a 92–20 victory over Scotland.

== Squad ==
Squad for 2026 Wheelchair Rugby League World Cup in Australia.

Player	Club (RLI)	Club (RFL) (Note: Rugby League Ireland operates a provincial competition in which both domestic and overseas players participate. RFL based players and some domestic players also play in Wheelchair Super League or Championship.)
Oran Spain	Leinster	(England) Wigan Warriors
Cian Horgan	Munster	(England) Halifax Panthers
Bledar Suxha	Leinster	—N/a
Toby Burton-Carter	Leinster	(England) Wigan Warriors
Mel Griffith (vc)	Leinster	(England) Wigan Warriors
Tom Martin	Ulster	(England) Bradford Bulls
Phil Roberts	Connacht	(England) Wigan Warriors
Peter Johnston	Ulster	(England) Midlands Hurricanes
Joseph Calcott (c)	Connacht	(England) Halifax Panthers
James McCarthy	Munster	(England) Midlands Hurricanes
Maurice Noonan	Leinster	—N/a
Jack Mangan	Munster	—N/a

== Competitive record ==
=== World Cup ===
World Cup Record
Year	Finish
(Australia) 2008	Did not enter
(England) 2013	5th
(France) 2017	Did not enter
(England) 2021	Group stage
(Australia) 2026	4th

=== Celtic Cup ===
Celtic Cup results by year: Ireland
Opponent \ Year	2015	2016	2017	2018	2019	2020	2021	2022	2023	2024	2025	2026
Scotland	W-W	D	W	W	L	–	W	W	W	W	W	W
Wales	x	L	L	L	L	–	L	L	D	W	W	W
Finish:	1	2	2	2	3	–	2	2	2	1	1	1

Notes:
- 2015: Wales did not take part – Ireland and Scotland played each other twice
- 2020: The tournament was cancelled in 2020

=== Results ===
Date	Score (Note: Ireland score given first)	Opponent	Competition	Ref.
7 July 2012	12–34	England	2012 Four Nations	
7 July 2012	4–44	Wales	2012 Four Nations	
8 July 2012	14–8	Scotland	2012 Four Nations	
3 July 2013	6–104	Wales	2013 World Cup Group stage	
6 July 2013	6–36	England	2013 World Cup Group stage	
9 July 2013	26–6	Scotland	2013 World Cup Group stage	
13 July 2013	36–14	Scotland	2013 World Cup 5th place play-off	
13 September 2014	58–10	Wales	2014 Four Nations	
14 September 2014	2–54	England	2014 Four Nations	
14 September 2014	60–10	Scotland	2014 Four Nations	
18 April 2015	52–28	Scotland	2015 Celtic Cup	
25 May 2015	80–48	Scotland	2015 Celtic Cup	
9 August 2015	46–29	Wales	International	
24 September 2015	16–32	Scotland	2015 European Championship	
24 September 2015	8–100	France	2015 European Championship	
25 September 2015	16–66	England	2015 European Championship	
26 September 2015	46–36	Wales	2015 European Championship	
26 September 2015	20–16	Scotland	2015 European Championship 3rd place play-off	
30 April 2016	26–76	Wales	2016 Celtic Cup	
30 April 2016	58–58	Scotland	2016 Celtic Cup	
29 April 2017	26–16	Scotland	2017 Celtic Cup	
29 April 2017	6–51	Wales	2017 Celtic Cup	
28 April 2018	68–36	Scotland	2018 Celtic Cup	
28 April 2018	30–84	Wales	2018 Celtic Cup	
27 April 2019	8–109	Wales	2019 Celtic Cup	
27 April 2019	42–52	Scotland	2019 Celtic Cup	
12 June 2021	52–32	Scotland	2021 Celtic Cup	
12 June 2021	16–96	Wales	2021 Celtic Cup	
16 October 2021	48–62	Wales	International	
7 May 2022	22–64	Wales	2022 Celtic Cup	
7 May 2022	38–35	Scotland	2022 Celtic Cup	
18 June 2022	52–22	Scotland	International	
8 October 2022	52–67	Wales	International	
3 November 2022	32–55	Spain	2021 World Cup Group stage	
6 November 2022	18–76	Australia	2021 World Cup Group stage	
9 November 2022	0–121	England	2021 World Cup Group stage	
18 June 2023	58–24	Scotland	2023 Celtic Cup	
18 June 2023	30–30	Wales	2023 Celtic Cup	
8 June 2024	68–34	Scotland	2024 Celtic Cup	
8 June 2024	68–32	Wales	2024 Celtic Cup	
21 November 2024	20–62	France	International	
24 May 2025	92–20	Scotland	2025 Celtic Cup	
24 May 2025	66–10	Wales	2025 Celtic Cup	
18 October 2025	58–6	Scotland	International	
23 May 2026	70–40	Scotland	2026 Celtic Cup	
23 May 2026	50–38	Wales	2026 Celtic Cup	
11 July 2026	16–106	France	International	
12 July 2026	36–66	France	International	
30 October 2026	110–10	United States	2026 World Cup Group stage	
3 November 2026	68–28	Wales	2026 World Cup Group stage	
6 November 2026	32–68	England	2026 World Cup Group stage	
10 November 2026	26–82	France	2026 World Cup semi-final	
13 November 2026	24–70	Australia	2026 World Cup 3rd-place play-off	

== Records and rankings ==
IRL Wheelchair World Rankings
Official rankings as of August 2026
Rank	Change	Team	Pts %
1	Steady	England	100
2	Steady	France	88
3	Steady	Ireland	67
4	Steady	Australia	64
5	Steady	Wales	43
6	Steady	Scotland	39
7	Steady	Spain	26
8	Steady	United States	22
9	Steady	New Zealand	5
10	Steady	Italy	0
Complete rankings at www.internationalrugbyleague.com

Ireland historical IRL Wheelchair World Rankings
	Jun 2020	Dec 2021	Jun 2022	Dec 2022	Jun 2023	Dec 2023	Jun 2024	Dec 2024	Jun 2025	Nov 2025	Aug 2026
Ranking	5	6 (▼1)	4 (▲2)	5 (▼1)	5	5	4 (▲1)	3 (▲1)	3	3	3
References											

- Biggest win: 110–10 v. United States (30 October 2026)
- Biggest defeat: 0–121 v. England (9 November 2022)

== Honours ==
- Celtic Cup (4): 2015, 2024, 2025, 2026
