= Wheelchair Rugby League World Cup =

Wheelchair Rugby League competition

- Upcoming tournament 2026 Wheelchair Rugby League World Cup
- Sport: Rugby league
- Instituted: 2008
- Region: International (IRL)
- Holders: England (3rd Title) (2026)
- Most titles: England (3 titles)
- Related competition: Men's World Cup; Women's World Cup; World Cup 9s

The Wheelchair Rugby League World Cup is an international wheelchair rugby league tournament contested by the top national teams. The tournament was first held in Australia as part of the 2008 Festival of World Cups and was upgraded to a centrepiece event in 2021.

== History ==
The inaugural tournament took place as part of the 2008 Festival of World Cups and was held in Sydney, Australia. The four teams participating were Australia, England, France and a Barbarians V Pacific Islands team. The fourth team were a replacement for New Zealand who withdrew before the start of the competition. England were the first winners, defeating hosts Australia 44–12 in the final.

In 2013 the tournament was held in Gillingham, England. The six teams that took part were Australia, England, France, Ireland, Scotland and Wales. France won the competition, defeating England 42–40 in the final. (Note: Some sources record the score as 44–40 to France) Wales won 16–12 against Australia in the third-place play-off and Ireland defeated Scotland 36–14 to finish fifth.

France hosted the 2017 tournament and won 38–34 in the final against England to retain the title. Seven teams took part in the tournament with the semi-finalists from 2013 placed in Group A and Italy, Spain and Scotland in Group B. Australia, who had intended to host the tournament, finished third after defeating newcomers Italy 58–45. Spain, who were also making their first appearance at the world cup, lost 45–66 to Wales in the fifth-place play-off match.

The 2021 tournament (played in 2022 due to the COVID-19 pandemic) saw the United States compete at the world cup for the first time. Norway, who were also due to make their debut, withdrew from the competition in February 2022. It was the first time that the wheelchair tournament was played simultaneously with the men's and women's competitions. The hosts England defeated France 28–24 in the final in front of a wheelchair rugby league world record crowd of 4,526 at Manchester Central.

== Format ==
The tournament has been played using different formats depending on the number of teams participating. In 2013 the six teams were divided into two groups. Each team played the two teams in their group and one team from the other group. This determined the qualifiers for the semi-finals which were followed by the play-off matches and final. In 2017 the seven teams were also divided into two groups, but this time Group A contained the four top ranked teams and Group B was made up of the lower ranked teams. The top two from Group A qualified for the semi-finals and were joined by the winners of play-offs between the top two Group B teams and the remaining Group A sides. The 2021 tournament had two groups of four teams with the top two from each progressing to the semi-finals.

== Trophy ==
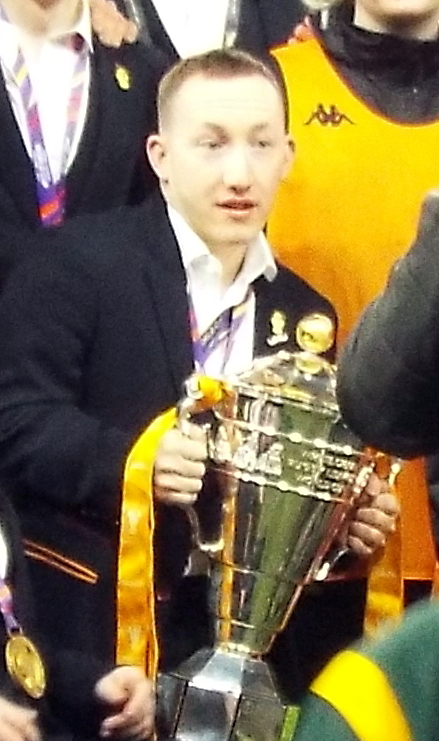
Nathan Collins with the trophy during celebrations at Old Trafford in 2022

In November 2019 a new trophy for the wheelchair tournament was unveiled. It shares a similar overall appearance to the men's and women's trophies and features imagery of wheelchair athletes in action. (Note: The match report for the 2017 final shows the previous trophy in a photograph with the France team and in the video of the match (1:58:00))

== Results ==
List of Wheelchair Rugby League World Cup finals
Ed.	Year	Winner	Score	Runner-up	Third place	Score	Fourth place	No. of teams
1	(Australia) 2008	England	44–12	Australia	France	52–0	Pacific Island Barbarians	4
2	(England) 2013	France	42–40	England	Wales	16–14	Australia	6
3	(France) 2017	France (2)	38–34	England	Australia	58–45	Italy	7
4	(England) 2022 (Note: Originally planned to be held in November 2021 but was postponed due to the COVID-19 pandemic in England)	England (2)	28–24	France	Australia and Wales			8
5	(Australia) 2026	England (3)	50–38	France	Australia	70–24	Ireland	8

=== Participating teams ===
Team	(Australia) 2008	(England) 2013	(France) 2017	(England) 2022	(Australia) 2026
Australia	2nd	4th	3rd	SF	3rd
England	1st	2nd	2nd	1st	1st
France	3rd	1st	1st	2nd	2nd
Ireland	–	5th	–	G	4th
Italy	–	–	4th	–	–
New Zealand	W (Note: A "Pacific Islands Barbarians" team replaced New Zealand with no other nations playing the sport at the time. The Barbarians finished 4th place. Wheelchair rugby league would not be played in New Zealand until 2024.)	–	–	–	7th
Norway	–	–	–	W	–
Scotland	–	6th	7th	G	6th
Spain	–	–	6th	G	–
United States	–	–	–	G	8th
Wales	–	3rd	5th	SF	5th
Refs					

Legend

- 1st = Champions
- 2nd = Runners-up
- 3rd or SF = Third place or semi-finalist
- 4th = Fourth place
- G = Group stage
- W = nation invited but withdrew beforehand
- – = nation did not enter competition.
- = Hosts
- Q = Qualified/Invited for upcoming tournament

== See also ==
- Men's Rugby League World Cup
- Women's Rugby League World Cup
- Wheelchair Rugby League European Championship
