= Wales national wheelchair rugby league team =

Wales
Team information
- Governing body: Wales Rugby League
- Region: Europe
- Head coach: Alan Caron
- IRL ranking: 5 (21 August 2026)

Team results
- First international
- Wales 20–6 Scotland; Hull, England (7 July 2012)
- World Cup
- Appearances: 4 (first time in 2013)
- Best result: 3rd, 2013; Semi-final, 2021

The Wales national wheelchair rugby league team represents Wales in wheelchair rugby league. They have competed at the World Cup, the European Championships and several tournaments within the British Isles, such as the Celtic Cup and Four Nations competitions.

== History ==
In July 2012 Wales took part their first international competition, the Four Nations, a round-robin tournament between England, Ireland, Scotland and Wales. The tournament was held as part of preparations for the world cup taking place the following year. At the 2013 World Cup Wales progressed from the group stage with wins over Australia and Ireland and defeat to England. They lost their semi-final against France and finished third by defeating Australia in the third-place play-off. Wales were unsuccessful at the 2014 Four Nations and the 2015 European Championships where they lost all their matches.

In 2016 they joined Scotland and Ireland to compete in the Celtic Cup, which had been first contested the previous year but became an annual three-team round-robin from 2016. Wales won the tournament in 2016 and until 2023 were unbeaten in the Celtic Cup.

At the 2017 World Cup Wales finished bottom of Group A with losses to Australia, England and France. They then lost to Italy in the group play-offs but defeated Spain to take fifth place. At the 2021 World Cup Wales suffered their heaviest ever defeat by losing their opening match 6–154 to France. However, victories over the United States and Scotland meant Ireland progressed to the knockout phase of the tournament where they lost to England in the semi-final. Stuart Williams was one of the ten players named in the RLWC2021 Wheelchair Team of the Tournament.

In February 2024, Wales travelled to Myrtle Beach, South Carolina, to play a two-match series against the United States in which were the first wheelchair internationals to be played in the Americas. Wales won both matches.

== Squad ==
Squad selected for the 2026 Wheelchair Rugby League World Cup in Australia.

Player	Club (RFL)	Club (WRL) (Note: Wales Rugby League operates the Welsh Invitational League outside of the wider RFL system. This competition sees many Welsh athletes participate, in addition to playing with their RFL club that would contest the Wheelchair Super League or Championship. Some clubs like, North Wales Crusaders, participate in both league structures.)
Stuart Williams	Edinburgh Giants	North Wales Crusaders
Jodie Boyd-Ward	Leeds Rhinos	N/A
Andrew Higgins	Midlands Hurricanes	N/A
Lee Sargent	Midlands Hurricanes	Cardiff Blue Dragons
Jonathan Gill	North Wales Crusaders	
Fionn McCabe	North Wales Crusaders	
Martin Turner	North Wales Crusaders	
Gareth Ramsey	Sheffield Eagles	N/A
Sid Ramsey	Sheffield Eagles	N/A
Matthew Turner	Wigan Warriors	North Wales Crusaders
Mark Williams	Wigan Warriors	South Wales Jets
John Berriman	York RLFC	N/A

== Competitive record ==
=== World Cup ===
World Cup Record
Year	Finish
(Australia) 2008	Did not enter
(England) 2013	3rd
(France) 2017	5th
(England) 2021	Semi-final
(Australia) 2026	5th

=== Celtic Cup ===
Celtic Cup results by year: Wales
Opponent \ Year	2015	2016	2017	2018	2019	2020	2021	2022	2023	2024	2025	2026
Ireland	x	W	W	W	W	–	W	W	D	L	L	L
Scotland	x	W	W	W	W	–	W	W	W	L	W	W
Finish:	x	1	1	1	1	–	1	1	1	3	2	2

Notes:
- 2015: Wales did not take part – Ireland and Scotland played each other twice
- 2020: The tournament was cancelled in 2020

=== Results ===
Date	Score (Note: Wales score given first)	Opponent	Competition	Ref.
7 July 2012	20–6	Scotland	2012 Four Nations	
7 July 2012	44–4	Ireland	2012 Four Nations	
8 July 2012	0–34	England	2012 Four Nations	
3 July 2013	104–6	Ireland	2013 World Cup Group stage	
6 July 2013	25–16	Australia	2013 World Cup Group stage	
9 July 2013	6–50	England	2013 World Cup Group stage	
11 July 2013	30–71	France	2013 World Cup Semi-final	
13 July 2013	16–14	Australia	2013 World Cup 3rd-place play-off	
13 September 2014	10–58	Ireland	2014 Four Nations	
13 September 2014	14–34	Scotland	2014 Four Nations	
14 September 2014	6–80	England	2014 Four Nations	
9 August 2015	29–46	Ireland	Friendly	
24 September 2015	25–26	Scotland	2015 European Championship	
25 September 2015	8–56	England	2015 European Championship	
25 September 2015	5–52	France	2015 European Championship	
26 September 2015	36–46	Ireland	2015 European Championship	
30 April 2016	76–26	Ireland	2016 Celtic Cup	
30 April 2016	92–22	Scotland	2016 Celtic Cup	
24 September 2016	42–18	Exiles (Note: The Exiles were a mix of Irish, Welsh and English players as Ireland were unable to travel with a full side to the 2016 Four Nations)	2016 Four Nations	
24 September 2016	41–28	Scotland	2016 Four Nations	
25 September 2016	14–56	England	2016 Four Nations	
25 September 2016	26–52	England	2016 Four Nations Final	
29 April 2017	51–6	Ireland	2017 Celtic Cup	
29 April 2017	71–0	Scotland	2017 Celtic Cup	
20 July 2017	24–72	Australia	2017 World Cup Group stage	
22 July 2017	32–78	England	2017 World Cup Group stage	
24 July 2017	10–118	France	2017 World Cup Group stage	
25 July 2017	24–105	Italy	2017 World Cup Group stage play-off	
27 July 2017	66–45	Spain	2017 World Cup 5th-place play-off	
28 April 2018	112–41	Scotland	2018 Celtic Cup	
28 April 2018	84–30	Ireland	2018 Celtic Cup	
27 April 2019	102–10	Scotland	2019 Celtic Cup	
27 April 2019	109–8	Ireland	2019 Celtic Cup	
28 September 2019	90–12	Scotland	2019 Tri-Nations	
28 September 2019	24–48	England	2019 Tri-Nations	
29 September 2019	40–54	England	2019 Tri-Nations Final	
12 June 2021	96–16	Ireland	2021 Celtic Cup	
12 June 2021	102–18	Scotland	2021 Celtic Cup	
26 June 2021	22–102	England	Friendly	
16 October 2021	62–48	Ireland	Friendly	
30 October 2021	70–34	Scotland	Friendly	
7 May 2022	64–22	Ireland	2022 Celtic Cup	
7 May 2022	116–6	Scotland	2022 Celtic Cup	
8 October 2022	67–52	Ireland	Friendly	
29 October 2022	38–86	Australia	Friendly	
4 November 2022	6–154	France	2021 World Cup Group stage	
7 November 2022	50–32	United States	2021 World Cup Group stage	
10 November 2022	70–36	Scotland	2021 World Cup Group stage	
13 November 2022	22–125	England	2021 World Cup Semi-final	
18 June 2023	30–30	Ireland	2023 Celtic Cup	
18 June 2023	76–30	Scotland	2023 Celtic Cup	
14 January 2024	34–24	British Army	Test series warm-up game	
2 February 2024	78–24	United States	Two match test series	
3 February 2024	52–22	United States	Two match test series	
8 June 2024	52–64	Scotland	2024 Celtic Cup	
8 June 2024	32–68	Ireland	2024 Celtic Cup	
24 May 2025	62–54	Scotland	2025 Celtic Cup	
24 May 2025	10–66	Ireland	2025 Celtic Cup	
22 November 2025	24–22	UK Armed Forces	Friendly	
14 March 2026	42–24	UK Armed Forces	Friendly	
23 May 2026	38–50	Ireland	2026 Celtic Cup	
23 May 2026	50–46	Scotland	2026 Celtic Cup	
30 October 2026	18–98	England	2026 World Cup Group stage	
3 November 2026	28–68	Ireland	2026 World Cup Group stage	
6 November 2026	92–18	United States	2026 World Cup Group stage	
9 November 2026	64–36	New Zealand	2026 World Cup Ranking semi-final	
12 November 2026	52–30	Scotland	2026 World Cup 5th-place play-off	

== Records and rankings ==
IRL Wheelchair World Rankings
Official rankings as of August 2026
Rank	Change	Team	Pts %
1	Steady	England	100
2	Steady	France	88
3	Steady	Ireland	67
4	Steady	Australia	64
5	Steady	Wales	43
6	Steady	Scotland	39
7	Steady	Spain	26
8	Steady	United States	22
9	Steady	New Zealand	5
10	Steady	Italy	0
Complete rankings at www.internationalrugbyleague.com

Wales historical IRL Wheelchair World Rankings
	Jun 2020	Dec 2021	Jun 2022	Dec 2022	Jun 2023	Dec 2023	Jun 2024	Dec 2024	Jun 2025	Nov 2025	Aug 2026
Ranking	3	3	3	4 (▼1)	3 (▲1)	3	5 (▼2)	5	5	5	5
References											

- Biggest win: 116–6 v. Scotland (7 May 2022)
- Biggest defeat: 6–154 v. France (4 November 2022)

== Honours ==
- Celtic Cup (7): 2016, 2017, 2018, 2019, 2021, 2022, 2023
