= Rugby league in Spain =

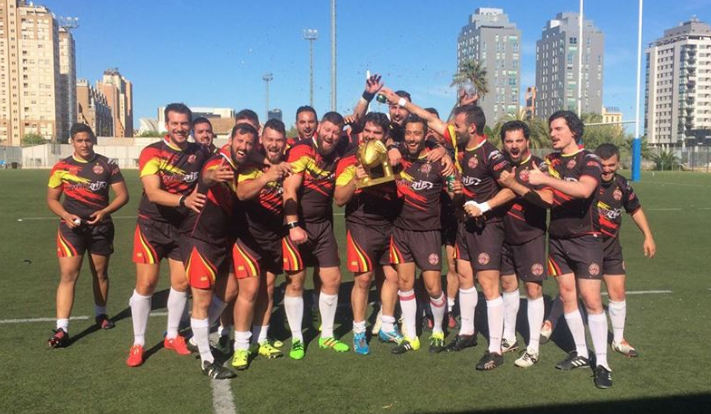
- The Custodians club of Madrid celebrate winning the 2016–17 season
- Country: Spain
- Governing body: Spanish Rugby League Association
- National team(s): Men's
- Nickname(s): Rugby XIII; Rugby Lliga (in Catalan)

Audience records
- Single match: 31,555 – Catalans Dragons vs Wigan Warriors at Camp Nou, Barcelona, 18 May 2019

Rugby league is a team sport that is played in several regions of Spain.

== History ==
=== Foundations in Catalonia ===
Rugby league in Spain effectively began in France (an established sport in France since in 1930s) with several attempts by French Catalan clubs to expand interest of the sport to Spanish Catalonia.

The first of these attempts occurred on 30 May 1993, when Perpignan-based XIII Catalan invited Huddersfield Giants to contested a friendly named "The Alex Angel Trophy" at the Estadi Olímpic Lluís Companys in Barcelona, with Huddersfield won 23–22.

The first governing body of rugby league in Spain was formed in Catalonia in 2007 solely for Catalonia. The Associació Catalana de Rugby Lliga was responsible for Catalan Rugby League Championship and the Catalonia national rugby league team and was granted observer status of the Rugby League European Federation (RLEF) in 2008. The body however was expelled from the RLEF in 2014 due to lack of activity since 2010.

During this time Catalans Dragons, a French club playing in the British league formed from the merging of the aforementioned XIII Catalan and AS Saint-Estève, played a regular season game on 20 June 2009, at Barcelona's Estadi Olímpic Lluís Companys against Warrington. Catalans led the match at halftime 10–6, but Warrington finished as the winners beating the Dragons 24–12.

=== Spanish Governance ===
In 2013, the Spanish Rugby League Association was formed governing rugby league the whole county. The body were granted observer status with the RLEF upon formation and promoted to affiliate members in 2015.

Spain attempted World Cup qualification for the first time in 2017, however lost both group games in Europe Pool B to Ireland and Russia.

In 2019 Catalan Dragons set a world record for the highest attended non-magic regular season Super League match attendance, electing to hold their home game against Wigan Warriors at the Camp Nou, attracting a crowd of 31,555.

Spain attempted World Cup qualification again in 2021, but again lost both pool matches to Italy and again Ireland.

== Governing body ==
The governing body for the sport in Spain is the Spanish Rugby League Association, which was formed in 2013.

== Competitions ==
The Campeonato Nacional de Liga (National League Championship) began in March 2014 with four clubs. The first Copa de España de Rugby League (Spanish Rugby League Cup) took place later in the same season. For the third season, which began in late 2015, the league had eight teams across two conferences. In the 2017–18 season the league had been split into two divisions: Serie A, with six teams, and Serie B. However, for 2018–19 only three teams were recorded as taking part in the Championship.

=== Domestic champions ===
List of winners
| Year | League | Cup | Ref. |
|---|---|---|---|
| 2014 | Irreductibles Edetans | Ciencias Valencia | |
| 2015 | Custodians Madrid | Valencian Warriors | |
| 2016 | Torrent Tigres | Custodians Madrid | |
| 2017 | Custodians Madrid | Torrent Tigres | |
| 2018 | Torrent Tigres | | |
| 2019 | Torrent Tigres | | |

== National team ==
=== Men's ===
The Spain national rugby league team was formed in 2014 and defeated Belgium in their first match. By beating Latvia in a playoff and then Malta and Greece in an initial qualifying group in 2015, they advanced to the final qualifying stage for the 2017 Rugby League World Cup, where they were placed in a three team group (Pool B) alongside Russia and Ireland. Their first result was a 6-40 loss to Russia, at Fili Stadium, Moscow on 15 October 2016, and their second a 46-6 defeat by Ireland, which resulted in their elimination.

=== Wheelchair ===
The Spain national wheelchair rugby league team took part in the 2017 and 2021 World Cups.

==== Current squad ====
Squad selected for 21 November 2024 fixture against England.

- Eric Perez (Biganos Eagles)
- Anthony Martin (Biganos Eagles)
- Joe Lacombe (Catalans Dragons)
- Mathieu Monedero (Catalans Dragons)
- Pascal Ambrosino (Catalans Dragons)
- Wil Seron (Mountauban Pandas)
- Yannick Martin (Mountauban Pandas)

==== Results ====
| Date | Score (Note: Spain score given first) | Opponent | Competition | Ref. |
|---|---|---|---|---|
| 18 July 2017 | 30–32 | Italy | Friendly | |
| 22 July 2017 | 39–68 | Italy | 2017 World Cup | |
| 24 July 2017 | 54–18 | Scotland | 2017 World Cup | |
| 25 July 2017 | 40–49 | Australia | 2017 World Cup | |
| 27 July 2017 | 45–66 | Wales | 2017 World Cup | |
| 3 September 2022 | 4–108 | France | Friendly | |
| 3 November 2022 | 55–32 | Ireland | 2021 World Cup | |
| 6 November 2022 | 12–104 | England | 2021 World Cup | |
| 9 November 2022 | 32–52 | Australia | 2021 World Cup | |
| 21 November 2024 | 28–58 | England | Friendly | |

== See also ==
- Sport in Spain
- Sport in Catalonia
- Rugby league in Catalonia
