= Rugby league in Italy =

- Country: Italy
- Governing body: Federazione Italiana Rugby League
- National team: Italy
- Nickname: The Azzurri
- First played: 1934

National competitions
- Rugby League World Cup

Club competitions
- Italia Rugby Football League

Rugby league is a team sport played in Italy since the 1950s.

== History ==
=== Foundations ===
In the early 1950s a number of Italian rugby union player embarked on a tour of the United Kingdom in France, against the approval of the Italian Rugby Federation who threatened to ban those who participated.

In January 1960 at the end of their 1959–60 Kangaroo Tour, the Australian national rugby league team played two internationals against an Italian representative team. The first game, played on 23 January at the Stadio Appiani in Padua in front of 3,500 fans, saw the Australia defeat Italy 37–15. The second game played the next day at the Stadio Omobono Tenni in Treviso, saw Australia win 67–22 in front of 3,105 fans. At the time of this tour, Italy had a 24-team domestic league.

With the Government of Italy refusing to recognise the sport, rugby league died out in Italy by the 1970s.

=== Re-birth ===
In 1993, Domenic Pezzano wrote a letter to La Fiamma, an Italian newspaper in Sydney, requesting an article to be published with the hope of attracting player to create a national team for the 1994 Rugby League World Sevens. The process untimely failed, though a second attempt the following year lead to the Italia Rugby League being founded in Sydney in 1995 who managed the team which entered the 1995 World Sevens. The new Italy national rugby league team initially select players who were Italian immigrants to Australia. The team expanded to a full thirteen-a-side team and attempted World Cup qualification in 2000.

In 2002, Italia Rugby League relocated to Italy and began developing native players. A year later it became a founding member of the Rugby League European Federation.

In 2006, Italia Rugby League was refounded, as the Federazione Italiana Rugby League (FIRL). The FIRL regained observer status by the Rugby League European Federation on 15 April 2008. The body gained Affiliate status of the International Rugby League (IRL) in 2010. Italy qualified for their first World Cup in 2013. In 2017, Italy were prompted to a Full Member of the IRL; however, was demoted back to Affiliate status in 2024 due to non-compliance with the membership criteria.

== Governing bodies ==
Federazione Italiana Rugby League (FIRL) is the current governing body for rugby league in Italy and has been an affiliate member of the International Rugby League since 2010. It had full membership status between 2017 and 2024.

== Domestic competitions ==
The Italian Rugby League Championship is an amateur rugby league competition that began in 2010. There are three conferences: north, central and south.

== National teams ==
=== Men ===
The men's national team were winners of the European Championship B in 2008 and 2009. They made first World Cup appearance in 2013.

=== Women ===
The women's national team won the Mediterranean Cup in 2017, defeating Lebanon 22–0 in Jounieh.

=== Wheelchair ===
The wheelchair rugby league national team made their first World Cup appearance in 2017 where they finished fourth in the tournament.

==== Results ====
Date	Score (Note: Italy score given first)	Opponent	Competition	Ref.
20 July 2017	110–6	Scotland	2017 World Cup	
22 July 2017	68–39	Spain	2017 World Cup	
25 July 2017	105–24	Wales	2017 World Cup	
25 July 2017	6–98	France	2017 World Cup	
27 July 2017	45–58	Australia	2017 World Cup	

== Demographics ==
The Federazione Italiana Rugby League primarily focuses on the North of the country, and has offices in Australia, France, and the UK to aid development of Italian players in these countries.

As in most countries, rugby league is a working class sport in Italy.

A lot of Italian players are Australian citizens and live in Australia, which has long drawn criticism of having a "lack of authenticity" in Italy.

== See also ==
- Italy national rugby league team
- Italy women's national rugby league team
