= International rugby league in 2025 =

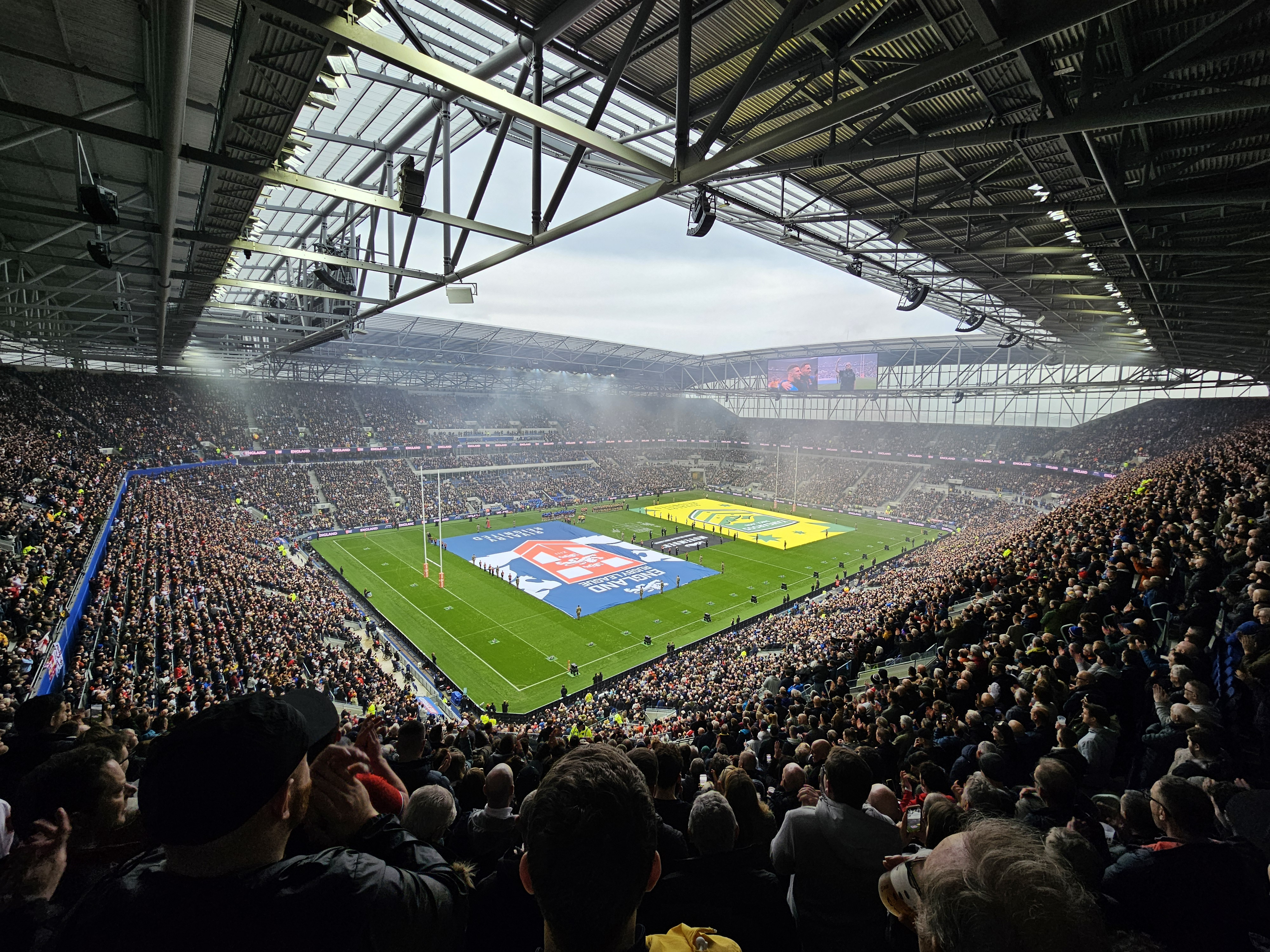
- England versus Australia ahead of the second test of the 2025 Ashes Series

A list of men's, women's, and wheelchair senior international rugby league matches played throughout 2025.

A † denotes a match that did not contribute to the IRL World Rankings - i.e. not a senior international match (SIM) as designated by the International Rugby League (IRL). (Note: IRL defines a SIM as "any match in which a player represents a national federation, where such match has been sanctioned and recognised by IRL and the relevant national federations as a match played between senior national teams, which are national teams of a member national federation playing in a match for world rankings points.")

The weekend of 25/26 October set a record for the most people attending international rugby league matches globally with 126,494; the bulk of the attendance came from the opening test of the Ashes and the men's/women's Pacific Cup second round double header. The record had been held by match week two of the 1957 Rugby League World Cup, where both games saw 86,655 in cumulative attendance.

The year was originally scheduled to contain the 2025 Rugby League World Cup, however was cancelled with and replaced by the 2026 Rugby League World Cup as a result of France withdrawing as hosts in 2023.

== Season overview ==
=== Men ===
Men's international tours
Start date	Touring side	Region	Results [Matches]
25 October	Australia	England	3–0 [3]
25 October	Ireland	Wales	1–1 [2]

Men's international friendlies
Date	Home team	Away team	Winners
22 February	France	Morocco	France
28 February	United States	Greece	Greece
4 October	Italy	Lebanon	Italy
4 October	Netherlands	Ireland	Ireland
11 October	Poland	Greece	Greece
12 October	Netherlands	Ukraine	Ukraine
19 October†	Japan	Niue	Niue
26 October	Poland	Czech Republic	Poland
2 November†	Cumbria	Nigeria	Cumbria
4 November†	Niue	South Africa	Niue
22 November	Jamaica	Canada	Jamaica
23 November	Ghana	Nigeria	Ghana
6 December	United States	Jamaica	Cancelled

Men's international tournaments
Start date	Tournament	Winners
11 October	European Championship D	Germany
18 October	European Championship C	Ukraine
18 October	European Championship B	Serbia
18 October	Pacific Bowl	Papua New Guinea
19 October	Pacific Cup	New Zealand
25 October	World Cup qualification Northern Hemisphere playoff	France
9 November	World Cup qualification Southern Hemisphere playoff	Cook Islands
27 November†	Asian Championships	Singapore

=== Women ===
Women's international tours
Start date	Touring side	Region	Results [Matches]
7 October	Ghana	Nigeria	0–2 [2]

Women's international friendlies
Date	Home team	Away team	Winners
28 February	United States	Greece	United States
1 March	Australia	England	Australia
12 July	Ireland	France	France
3 August	Wales	Scotland	Wales
9 August	Wales	England	England
4 October	Italy	Lebanon	Lebanon
4 October	Netherlands	Ireland	Ireland
1 November	Scotland	Jamaica	Scotland
23 November	Ghana	Nigeria	Nigeria
6 December	United States	Jamaica	Cancelled
13 December	Netherlands	Greece	Netherlands

Women's international tournaments
Start date	Tournament	Winners
21 October	World Cup qualification, interconfederation playoff	Fiji
18 October	Pacific Bowl	Cook Islands
19 October	Pacific Cup	Australia

=== Wheelchair ===
Wheelchair international tours
Start date	Touring side	Region	Results [Matches]
30 October	England	Australia	2–0 [2]

Wheelchair international friendlies
Date	Home team	Away team	Winners
18 October	Scotland	Ireland	Ireland

Wheelchair international tournaments
Start date	Tournament	Winners
24 May	Celtic Cup	Ireland

== Rankings ==
The following were the rankings at the beginning of the season.

IRL Men's World Rankings
Official rankings as of December 2024
Rank	Change	Team	Pts %
1	Steady	Australia	100
2	Steady	New Zealand	86
3	Steady	England	84
4	▲1	Tonga	63
5	▼1	Samoa	54
6	▲1	Papua New Guinea	53
7	▼1	Fiji	44
8	Steady	France	30
9	▲2	Serbia	23
10	Steady	Cook Islands	22
11	▲1	Netherlands	22
12	▲5	Wales	18
13	▲2	Malta	17
14	▲6	Ukraine	13
15	▼1	Greece	12
16	▼7	Lebanon	12
17	▼4	Italy	11
18	▼2	Ireland	9
19	▼1	Jamaica	8
20	▲1	Czech Republic	8
21	▲2	Chile	8
22	▼3	Scotland	7
23	▲4	Philippines	7
24	▲7	United States	7
25	▼1	Poland	5
26	▲2	South Africa	5
27	▼5	Germany	5
28	▼3	Norway	5
29	▲4	Brazil	4
30	▼4	Kenya	4
31	▲10	Canada	4
32	Steady	Montenegro	4
33	▲2	North Macedonia	3
34	▲15	Argentina	3
35	▲5	Albania	2
36	Steady	Bulgaria	2
37	▼7	Ghana	2
38	▼9	Nigeria	2
39	▼5	Turkey	1
40	▼3	Cameroon	1
41	▼2	Japan	1
42	▼4	Spain	1
43	▼1	Colombia	1
44	▼1	El Salvador	0
45	Steady	Russia	0
46	▲1	Bosnia and Herzegovina	0
47	▲3	Hong Kong	0
48	▲3	Solomon Islands	0
49	▲8	Vanuatu	0
50	Steady	Niue	0
51	▼1	Latvia	0
52	▲2	Denmark	0
53	▲2	Belgium	0
54	▼4	Estonia	0
55	▼9	Sweden	0
56	▼12	Morocco	0
57	▼9	Hungary	0
Complete rankings at INTRL.SPORT

IRL Women's World Rankings
Official rankings as of December 2024
Rank	Change	Team	Pts %
1	Steady	Australia	100
2	Steady	New Zealand	83
3	Steady	England	55
4	Steady	France	36
5	Steady	Papua New Guinea	29
6	▲1	Wales	24
7	▲3	Ireland	19
8	▲1	Greece	18
9	▼1	Canada	17
10	▼4	Cook Islands	17
11	▲13	Samoa	14
12	▼1	Serbia	11
13	Steady	Netherlands	11
14	▲2	United States	10
15	▼1	Tonga	10
16	▲10	Fiji	8
17	▲1	Nigeria	8
18	▲2	Kenya	7
19	▼4	Philippines	7
20	▼8	Brazil	6
21	▼2	Italy	5
22	Steady	Uganda	3
23	Steady	Jamaica	3
24	▲1	Ghana	2
25	▼4	Malta	2
26	▼9	Turkey	2
27	Steady	Lebanon	0
Complete rankings at INTRL.SPORT

IRL Wheelchair World Rankings
Official rankings as of December 2024
Rank	Change	Team	Pts %
1	Steady	England	100
2	Steady	France	96
3	▲1	Ireland	55
4	▼1	Australia	52
5	Steady	Wales	47
6	Steady	Scotland	38
7	▲1	Spain	27
8	▼1	United States	25
9	New entry	New Zealand	5
10	▼1	Italy	0
Complete rankings at INTRL.SPORT

== February ==
=== France men v Morocco ===
22 February 2025
17:00 CET (UTC+01:00)

France	34–10	Morocco
Tries: Dall'astra, Crunel, Pourchi (2), Pedragosa, Lis; Goals: Dall'astra (5/6)	Report	Tries: Anas, Dermoune; Goals: Lafifi (1/2)

Parc Des Sports, Avignon
Attendance: 1,000
Referee: Mo Drizza (France)

Team details
France		Position	Morocco
Name	Number	Position	Number	Name
Zachary Santo	1	FB	1	Kaiss Lafifi
Quentin Crunel	2	WG	2	Zakaria Hammouch
Romeo Tropis	3	CE	3	Sofiane Hemissi
Yann Doutres Pedragosa	4	CE	4	Yannis Ahcini
Baptiste Pourchi	5	WG	5	Yannis Hamri
Lenny Chachoua	6	SO	6	Hamza Bachoukh,
Mathis Dall'astra	7	SH	7	Yliass Lamarti
Alexis Lis	8	PR	8	Houcine Fakir
Mahault Beauvilliers	9	HK	9	Hakim Ed Dermoune,
Theo Fouque	10	PF	10	Naji Anas
Luc Brocas	11	SR	11	Adam Ed-Diche
Anthony Munico	12	SR	12	Mouadh Bida,
Felix Aubry	13	LF	13	Ayoub Mesyani
Marc Pena Argeles	14	IN	14	Abdelaziz Damen
Sacha Kouassi	15	IN	15	Yannis Hettat
Arthur Salles	16	IN	16	Yassine Al Gannfoufi
Mathis Frayssinous	17	IN	17	Yassin Messaoudi
Maxime Greseque		Coach		Oliver Janzac

=== USA v Greece double header ===
Women

28 February 2025
13:30 PT (UTC-08:00)

United States	46–0	Greece
Tries: Fisch (4), Black-Keels, Campbell, Sheldon, Thompson, White; Goals: Oliveri (5/9)	Report

Silver Bowl Park, Las Vegas
Referee: John Ashton (England)

Team details
USA		Position	Greece
Name	Number	Position	Number	Name
Taylor White	1	FB	1	Asimina Mastoraki
Shannon Hustosky	2	WG	2	Magdelini Stavrianou
Haley Sheldon	3	CE	3	Sam Glumac
Cyndi Campbell	4	CE	4	Ourania Koutsikou
Stacia Thompson	5	WG	5	Sotiria Skouroliakou
Roybyn Oliveri	6	SO	6	Angelina Ballas
Samantha Black-Keels	7	SH	7	Sophie Kitasaneli
Narcisse Jordan	8	PR	8	Lavinia Taukamo
Nicole Fisch	9	HK	9	Meleanna Waters
Kadie Sandford	10	PF	10	Marilena Girlemi
Jeanna Beard	11	SR	11	Lisa Poulakis
Rachael Bradley	12	SR	12	Stephanie Glumac
Esther Anderson	13	LF	13	Nicola Munday
Ashley Mencke	14	IN	14	Ella Panagiotopoulos
Lucinda Darvell	15	IN	15	Effie Skouroliakou
Bee Blackman	16	IN	16	Eleni Zis
Erin Walsh	17	IN	17	Claudia Koule
Sean Rutgerson		Coach		Dennis Lowe

Men

28 February 2025
15:30 PT (UTC-08:00)

United States	10–46	Greece
Tries: Gillard, Webb; Goals: McCrory (1/2)	Report	Tries: Bakis, Gal, Markopoulos (2), John Mitsias (2), Tuliatu, Stratis (2); Goals: Stratis (5/8), Markopoulos (0/1)

Silver Bowl Park, Las Vegas
Referee: Cody Kuxmann (USA)

Team details
USA		Position	Greece
Name	Number	Position	Number	Name
David Washington	1	FB	1	Tyrone Tsagalias
Jason Martin	2	WG	2	Sam Stratis
Ryan Burroughs	3	CE	3	Alexandros Aliu
Daniel Vidot	4	CE	4	Nick Mougios
Ulice Gillard	5	WG	5	John Mitsias
Ryan Bannerot	6	SO	6	Leon Bakis
Peter Lupton	7	SH	7	Eddie Markopoulos
Tevita Bryce	8	PR	8	Robert Tuliatu
Mason McCrory	9	HK	9	Kody Papa
Anson Jiang	10	PF	10	Nicholas Tuliatu
Wes Piggins	11	SR	11	Chris Slater-Raptis
Joe Eichner	12	SR	12	Nicholas Flocas
Malcolm Webb	13	LF	13	Deon Iro
Fatai Makavaha	14	IN	14	Billy Mougios
Max Dacey	15	IN	15	Myles Gal
Anthony Russo	16	IN	16	Mitchell Zampatides
Celcius Tarawhiti	17	IN	17	Theodoros Nianiakas
Sean Rutgerson		Coach		Steve Georgallis

United States and Greece men's teams had intended to play a second game two days prior on 26 February 18:00 kick-off at the same venue. The game was cancelled after copper cables were stolen from the floodlights leaving them inoperable. The men's and women's double header on the 28 February were brought forward by four hours as a result.

== March ==
=== Australia women v England in the United States ===
1 March 2025
18:15 PST (UTC-08:00)

Australia	90–4	England
Tries: Robinson 3, Penitani, Upton 5, Mato, Kelly 2, Sergis 3, Whitfeld, Joseph; Goals: Aiken 11/17	1st: 38–0; 2nd: 52–4; Report	Tries: Roche; Goals: Bennett 0/1

Allegiant Stadium, Paradise, United States
Attendance: 45,209
Referee: Belinda Sharpe (Australia)
Touch judges: Tara Jones, Liam Moore (England)

Team details
Australia		Position	England
Name	Number	Position	Number	Name
Tamika Upton	1	FB	1	Georgie Dagger
Jakiya Whitfeld	2	WG	2	Eboni Partington
Isabelle Kelly	3	CE	3	Tamzin Renouf
Tiana Penitani	4	CE	4	Amy Hardcastle
Julia Robinson	5	WG	5	Anna Davies
Ali Brigginshaw	6	FE/SO	6	Zoe Harris
Tarryn Aiken	7	HB/SH	7	Georgia Roche
Shannon Mato	8	PR	8	Olivia Wood
Olivia Higgins	9	HK	9	Keara Bennett
Kezie Apps	10	PF	10	Shona Hoyle
Yasmin Clydsdale	11	SR	11	Hollie Dodd
Olivia Kernick	12	SR	12	Paige Travis
Simiana Taufa-Kautai	13	LK/LF	13	Jodie Cunningham
Quincy Dodd	14	IN	14	Katie Mottershead
Jessica Sergis	15	IN	15	Vicky Whitfield
Sarah Togatuki	16	IN	16	Bella Sykes
Keilee Joseph	17	IN	17	Izzy Northrop
Jess Skinner		Coach		Stuart Barrow

This match was initially planned to be Test 1 of a three match women's Ashes series to be concluded in the autumn. Originally set to take place in Australia but later switched to England alongside the equivalent men's games. The match, which come the day of the fixture was no longer being described as part of the Ashes, saw a blowout 90–4 victory in Australia's favour. In the weeks that followed, criticism occurred as a result of the gulf in performance which highlighted the superior set up that women's rugby league had in Australia compared to England. No fixtures of the 2025 Women's Ashes were planned as of 26 March 2025, the date of announcement of the 2025 Men's Ashes; and in the months that followed, doubts emerged over the productiveness of contesting the remaining fixtures. The 2025 women's Ashes were officially confirmed as shelved in the International Rugby League's biannual ranking updates in July, with no mention of the proposed fixtures in their fixture preview for the next rankings cycle.

NB: Match played to Australia's 70 minute rule for women's rugby league.

== May ==
=== Celtic Cup (wheelchair) ===
24 May 2025
11:00 BST (UTC+01:00)

Wales	62–54	Scotland
Tries: Stuart Williams (3), Boyd-Ward (2), Powell (3), Trigg-Turner (3); Goals: Trigg-Turner (9/11)	report	Tries: Willans (2), Blackmore (2), Davidson (2), Hill (2), Devlin; Goals: Willans (9/9)

Archers Arena, Cardiff Metropolitan University
Referees: Adam Rigby (England), Jake Brook (England)
Touch judges: Matt Ball (England), Harry Jones (Wales)

Team details
Wales		Position	Scotland
Name	Number	Position	Number	Name
Stuart Williams	1	Starter	1	John Willans
Mark Williams	2	Starter	2	Calum Davidson
Scott Trigg-Turner	3	Starter	3	Connor Blackmore
Alex Powell	4	Starter	4	Dave Hill
Jodie Boyd-Ward	5	Starter	5	Sarah Devlin
Lee Sargent	6	Interchange	6	Hamish Douglas
Jess Booth (not used)	7	Interchange	7	Olivia Foulton
Brogan Evans	8	Interchange	8	Calum Japes
Jonathan Gill	9	CS	9	Mark Robertson
Alan Caron		Coach		Martyn Gill

24 May 2025
13:00 BST (UTC+01:00)

Scotland	20–92	Ireland
Tries: Blackmore (2), Foulton, Robertson; Goals: Willans (1/2), Davidson (1/2)	report	Tries: Calcott (3), Burton-Carter (3), McCarthy (2), Johnston (3), Martin (2), Horgan (5); Goals: Johnston (7/13), Calcott (3/5)

Archers Arena, Cardiff Metropolitan University
Referees: Matt Ball (England), Harry Jones (Wales)
Touch judges: Jake Brook (England), Adam Rigby (England)

Team details
Scotland		Position	Ireland
Name	Number	Position	Number	Name
John Willans	1	Starter	1	Toby Burton-Carter
Calum Davidson	2	Starter	2	Peter Johnston
Connor Blackmore	3	Starter	3	Melanie Griffiths
Olivia Foulton	4	Starter	4	Joe Calcott
Calum Japes	5	Starter	5	James McCarthy
Martin Dougan	6	Interchange	6	Tom Martin
Dave Hill	7	Interchange	7	Jack Shannon Cole
Mark Robertson	8	Interchange	8	Cian Horgan
Martyn Gill		Coach		Phil Roberts

24 May 2025
15:00 BST (UTC+01:00)

Wales	10–66	Ireland
Tries: Stuart Williams, Mark Williams; Goals: Trigg-Turner (1/2)	report	Tries: Calcott (6), Spain, Griffiths (2), Burton-Carter, Johnston, Horgan (2); Goals: Calcott (2/6), Johnston (5/7)

Archers Arena, Cardiff Metropolitan University
Referees: Jake Brook (England), Matt Ball (England)
Touch judges: Adam Rigby (England), Harry Jones (Wales)

Team details
Wales		Position	Ireland
Name	Number	Position	Number	Name
Stuart Williams	1	Starter	1	Toby Burton-Carter
Mark Williams	2	Starter	2	Melanie Griffiths
Scott Trigg-Turner	3	Starter	3	Oran Spain
Alex Powell	4	Starter	4	Tom Martin
Jodie Boyd-Ward	5	Starter	5	Joe Calcott
Lee Sargent	6	Interchange	6	Cian Horgan
Jonathan Gill	7	Interchange	7	Phil Roberts
Jakub Wasieczko	8	Interchange	8	Peter Johnston
Alan Caron		Coach		Phil Roberts

== July ==
=== Ireland women v France ===
12 July 2025
16:00 IST (UTC+01:00)

Ireland	4–34	France
Tries: O'Dwyer; Goals: Cobain (0/1)	Report	Tries: Vilanove (3), Medina (2), Absi, Ramazeilles; Goals: Diraison (3/7)

Garda Westmanstown RFC, Dublin
Referee: James Spencer (Ireland)

Team details
Ireland		Position	France
Name	Number	Position	Number	Name
Cliodhna O'Sullivan	1	FB	1	Manon Samarra
Aimee Clarke	2	WG	2	Amael Vilanove
Anna Potterton	3	CE	3	Melissa Medina
Katie Ann O'Neil	4	CE	4	Laureane Biville
Holly O'Dwyer	5	WG	5	Perle Ramazeilles
Emma Kelly	6	SO	6	Justine Roses
Jade Walker	7	SH	7	Lisa Diraison
Orlaith McAuliffe	8	PR	8	Leila Bessahli
Polly Roberts	9	HK	9	Dorine Samarra
Stacy Hanley	10	PF	10	Salome Segala
Aifric Ni Ghibine	11	SR	11	Kaina Absi
Storm Cobain	12	SR	12	Stecy Bessiere
Iona McCusker	13	LF	13	Tallis Kuresa
Megan Preston	14	IN	14	Noémie Samuel
Molly Boyne	15	IN	15	Anais Andral
Aine Rutley	16	IN	16	Pauline Noe
Becky Webb	17	IN	17	Elodie Pacull
Matt Kennerson		Coach		Romain Maillot

== August ==
=== Wales women v Scotland ===
3 August 2025
13:00 BST (UTC+01:00)

Wales	18–12	Scotland
Tries: Davies, Salter, Dainton; Goals: Ruck (3/3)	Report	Tries: Field, Smart; Goals: Smart (2/3)

The Gnoll, Neath
Referee: Rob Apsee (Wales)

Team details
Wales		Position	Scotland
Name	Number	Position	Number	Name
Megan Whittaker	1	FB	1	Rebecca Smart
Lucia Davies	2	WG	2	Sarah Smart
Olivia Williams	3	CE	3	Sammi Simpson
Kathryn Salter	4	CE	4	Emma Whelsford
Danielle McGifford	5	WG	5	Eve Tonkin
Carys Marsh	6	SO	6	Demi Fisher
Amberly Ruck	7	SH	7	Isabel Glover
Ffion Jenkins	8	PR	8	Grace Field
Jasmine Gibbons	9	HK	9	Abi Gordon
Gracie Hobbs	10	PF	10	Kaiya Glynn
Georgia Cussons	11	SR	11	Charlotte Hill
Charley Mundy	12	SR	12	Steph Gray
Bethan Dainton	13	LF	13	Nicole Stewart
Sara Jones	14	IN	14	Morgan Pearson
Agnes Wood	15	IN	15	Georgia Briggs
Amy Price	16	IN	16	Rebecca Moffat
Ffion Jones	17	IN	17	Ciorstadia Ainsworth
Tom Brindle		Coach		John Whalley

=== Wales women v England ===
9 August 2025
17:30 BST (UTC+01:00)

Wales	0–62	England
	Report	Tries: Foubister, Jones, Davies (2), Murray, Hunter (2), Rowe, Sykes, Partington, Wilson; Goals: Rowe (9/11)

The Gnoll, Neath
Attendance: 468
Referee: Geoffrey Poumès (France)
Player of the Match: Isobel Rowe (England)

Team details
Wales		Position	England
Name	Number	Position	Number	Name
Leanne Burnell	1	FB	1	Gracie Banks
Lucia Davies	2	WG	2	Anna Davies
Olivia Williams	3	CE	3	Georgia Wilson
Kathryn Salter	4	CE	4	Molly Jones
Dani McGifford	5	WG	5	Eboni Partington
Megan Whittaker	6	SO	6	Isabel Rowe
Amberly Ruck	7	SH	7	Jenna Foubister
Agnes Wood	8	PR	8	Olivia Wood
Carys Marsh	9	HK	9	Katie Mottershead
Gracie Hobbs	10	PF	10	Isabel Northorp
Georgia Cussons	11	SR	11	Lucy Murray
Charlie Mundy	12	SR	12	Eva Hunter
Bethan Dainton	13	LF	13	Jodie Cunningham
Jasmine Gibbons	14	IN	14	Ruby Bruce
Ffion Jenkins	15	IN	15	Victoria Whitfield
Amy Price	16	IN	16	Isabella Skyes
Hannah Jones	17	IN	17	Savannah Andrade
Tom Brindle		Coach		Stuart Barrow

=== Brazil men v Manchester Metropolitan University ===
23 August 2025
14:00

Brazil	34–18†	Manchester Metropolitan University R.L.F.C.
	Report

Parque das Águas, São Lourenço

=== Canada women tour of Fiji ===
27 August 2025
15:00 FJT (UTC+12:00)

RISE Academy XIII	30–8†	Canada
	Report

Churchill Park, Lautoka

Team details
RISE Academy		Position	Canada
Name	Number	Position	Number	Name
Asenaca Vesinawailagi	1	FB	1	Jessica Joubarne
Rina Suluma	2	WG	2	Maddie Hobson
Vasiti Rekisa	3	CE	3	Candace Scholten
Vasemaca Duva	4	CE	4	Grace Campbell
Elenoa Patricia	5	WG	5	Brittany Jones
Adi Sokula Waqa	6	FE/SO	6	Alayna Scramstad
Litia Kereburogo	7	HB/SH	7	Dani Franada
Lotise Tabua	8	PR	8	Tamisha Toussaint
Vitorina Toga	9	HK	9	Alanna Fittes
Kinisimere Nairi	10	PF	10	Ada Okonkwo
Josiliva Mocenacagi	11	SR	11	Rachel Choboter
Naomi Tegu	12	SR	12	Beth Hoffsetter
Kinisalote Vusawa	13	LK/LF	13	Eleta Mitton
Salote Sukakinamena	14	IN	14	Tash Naismith
Salacieli Sisiwa	15	IN	15	Jessica Bateman
Vika Sadrua	16	IN	16	Rebecaa Kochuk
Louisa Saqanaivalu	17	IN	17	Fedelia Omoghan
Keresi Latidreketi	18	IN	18	Renee Gonzalez-Toews
Meresiana Tareguci	19	RES	19	Sara Canini
Adi Delailovu	20	IN	20	Ale Lewis
Seeana Lutu	21	IN	21	Sarah Maguire
Mereseini Drotini	22	IN	22	Gabrielle Hindley
Melania Vosamosi	23	IN	23	Petra Woods
Losalini Cikaitoga	24	IN	24	Maddy Aberg
Mereiva Latidreketi	25	IN
Sevanaia Koroi		Coach		Matt Barron

30 August 2025
14:00 FJT (UTC+12:00)

Fiji Residents	34–12†	Canada
	[Report]

Churchill Park, Lautoka

Team details
Fiji Residents		Position	Canada
Name	Number	Position	Number	Name
Asebaca Diranuve	1	FB	1	Petra Woods
Caroline Valentine	2	WG	2	Maddie Hobson
Salote Vuniwaqa	3	CE	3	Renee Gonzalez-Toews
Ateca Nacaucauceva	4	CE	4	Grace Campbell
Vilimaina Naitaku	5	WG	5	Candace Scholten
Timaima Ravisa	6	FE/SO	6	Alayna Scramstad
Jennifer Ravutia	7	HB/SH	7	Dani Franada
Nunia Kawa	8	PR	8	Fedelia Omoghan
Asena Rokomarama	9	HK	9	Alanna Fittes
Laisa Takayawa	10	PF	10	Sarah Maguire
Pearl Grace	11	SR	11	Gabrielle Hindley
Susana Senivolau	12	SR	12	Maddy Aberg
Sereana Nasau	13	LK/LF	13	Tamisha Toussaint
Ateca Regu	14	IN	14	Tash Naismith
Esther Rainima	15	IN	15	Rachel Choboter
Adi Vika	16	IN	16	Rebecca Kochuk
Ateca Lewaitikana	17	IN	17	Ada Okonkwo
Grace Waqa	18	IN	18	Eleta Mitton
Luisa Waqa	19	RES	19	Sara Canini
Selai Navuna	20	IN	20	Beth Hofstetter
Mere Kilaiwekana	21	IN	21	Ale Lewis
Zipporah Salusalu	22	IN	22	Jessica Bateman
Sokoveti	23	IN	23	Jessica Joubarne
Vitorina Toga	24	IN	24	Brittany Jones
Josephine Moceinacagi	25	IN
Kinisalote Vusawa	26	IN
Vilame Domo		Coach		Matt Barron

== September ==
=== British Army v Brazil men ===
6 September 2025
14:30 BST (UTC+01:00)

British Army	26–16†	Brazil
	Report

Crosfields A.R.L.F.C., Warrington

== October ==
=== Italy v Lebanon double header in Australia ===
Women

4 October 2025
13:00 CEST (UTC+02:00)

Italy	28–36	Lebanon
Tries: Yallop (3), Fleming (2), Acquasanta; Goals: Luccitti (2/6)	report	Tries: Ibrahim (4), Nabhan, Nour, Semrani, Azar; Goals: Azar (0/2), McCregor (2/6)

Lidcombe Oval, Sydney
Referee: Isaac El-Hassan (Australia)

Team details
Italy		Position	Lebanon
Name	Number	Position	Number	Name
Rebecca Pollard	1	FB	1	Debbie Doueihi
Marissa Acquasanta	2	WG	2	Elni Azar
Brielle Luccitti	3	CE	3	Kenzie Moujalli
Kaira Barnes	4	CE	4	Sienna Ibrahim
Brandy Yallop	5	WG	5	Amelia Semrani
Nikki Perungini	6	SO/FE	6	Amirah El Abdallah
Rhiannon Gregorio	7	SH/HB	7	Sama Nour
Bronte Wilson	8	PR	8	Sienna Deeley
Kayla Fleming	9	HK	9	Dalia Nabhan
Deborah Wilson	10	PF	10	Taylor Moussa
Josephine Lenaz	11	SR	11	Amal Dandan
Ashleigh Maiuri	12	SR	12	Eboni Moses
Abbey Krzanic	13	LF/LK	13	Jamilee McCregor
Amali Ahmet	14	IN	14	Priscilla Younes
Hannah Ahmet	15	IN	15	Myah Tumupu
Takira Gaspari	16	IN	16	Monica Dann
Sofia Osman	17	IN
Massimo Gregorio		Coach		Sam Saadat

Men

4 October 2025
15:00 CEST (UTC+02:00)

Italy	16–14	Lebanon
Tries: Piccirilli, Lenzo (2); Goals: Piccirilli (2/4)	report	Tries: Alameddine, J. Ibrahim, Bilal El Youssef; Goals: J. Ibrahim (0/2), Arahu (1/1)

Lidcombe Oval, Sydney
Referee: Liam Richardson (Australia)

Team details
Italy		Position	Lebanon
Name	Number	Position	Number	Name
Jack Piccirilli	1	FB	1	Zachariah Nachar
Jackson Lenzo	2	WG	2	Mohamed Alameddine
Jayden Carbonaro	3	CE	3	Ayman Maarbani
George Stratos	4	CE	4	Elias Abou Mrad
Damon Potts	5	WG	5	Bilal El Youssef
James Borges	6	SO/FE	6	Jonathon Ibrahim
Joel Saldeneri	7	SH/HB	7	Kade Moujalli
Aaron Carbonaro	8	PR	8	Daniel Ahmed Arahu
Nick Lenaz	9	HK	9	Yeyha Ayache
Dominic Biondi	10	PF	10	Ibrahim El Chiekh
Massimo Mari	11	SR	11	Mikael Ibrahim
Lenny Plati	12	SR	12	Joshua Maree
Marco Moretti	13	LF/LK	13	Moustafa Dirani
Zachary Farrugia	14	IN	14	Xavier Ndaira
Luke Wakefield	15	IN	15	Ibrahim El Labban
Marco Severino	16	IN	16	AJ El Ters
Noah De Molan	17	IN	17	James Khoo
Leo Epifania		Coach		Michael Habib

=== Netherlands v Ireland double header ===
Women

4 October 2025
14:00 CEST (UTC+02:00)

Netherlands	6–42	Ireland
Tries: Geerlings; Goals: Van Zanten (1/1)	Report	Tries: Young, McCusker (2), O'Sullivan, Carroll (2), Cobain, Hanley; Goals: Cobain (5/8)

RC The Bassets, Sassenheim
Referee: Moray Gilland (Scotland)

Team details
Netherlands		Position	Ireland
Name	Number	Position	Number	Name
Hiske Blom	1	FB	1	Aimee Clarke
Tessa Van Zanten	2	WG	2	Lena Kibler
Monischa Hiermons	3	CE	3	Steph Carroll
Dana Burik	4	CE	4	Molly Young
Danique Nikkels	5	WG	5	Cliodhna O'Sullivan
Nicky Dix	6	SO	6	Emma Kelly
Rixt Aerts	7	SH	7	Jade Walker
Fiona Kalf	8	PR	8	Aifric Ni Ghibine
Vera Van Der Zwan	9	HK	9	Niamh Griffin
Eva Peroti	10	PF	10	Stacy Hanley
Anniek Nauta	11	SR	11	Storm Cobain
Sylvie Moelee	12	SR	12	Anna Potterton
Kaylee Geerlings	13	LF	13	Iona McCusker
Fleur Michiels	14	IN	14	Polly Roberts
Dominique Velema	15	IN	15	Molly Boyne
Eva Aerts	16	IN	16	Becky Webb
Eline Zomer	17	IN	17	Katie McCallion
Matt Rigby		Coach		Matt Kennerson

Men

4 October 2025
16:00 CEST (UTC+02:00)

Netherlands	0–30	Ireland
	Report	Tries: Lynch, Cahill, Whitford (2), Wing, Farrar; Goals: Farrar (3/6)

RC The Bassets, Sassenheim
Referee: Hans Verveer (Netherlands)

Team details
Netherlands		Position	Ireland
Name	Number	Position	Number	Name
Maas Van Der Reek	1	FB	1	Oliver Whitford
Thomas Frencken	2	WG	2	Stephen Cahill
Mike Prins	3	CE	3	Paul McCullagh
Hidde Van Der Berg	4	CE	4	Aaron Lynch
Stan Boersma	5	WG	5	Lewis Wing
Kees Kuijpers	6	SO	6	James Farrar
Arie-Tjerk Razoux Schultz	7	SH	7	Tom Ash
Mauricio Gomez Pazos	8	PR	8	Jamie Gill
Rik Boats	9	HK	9	Will Walker
Tom Turnock	10	PF	10	Daniel Lynch
Paul Kuijpers	11	SR	11	Conlan Mawson
Mavi Geevers	12	SR	12	Daniel Coop
Tom Van Bokhoven	13	LF	13	Liam O'Callaghan
Ruben Stuifzand	14	IN	14	Ryan Hogg
Shadan Lavia	15	IN	15	Oisin Carroll
Sylvan Vonken	16	IN	16	Darie Kemp
Sam Kulmpert	17	IN	17	Conor Mahon
Dave Hunter		Coach		Wayne Kerr

=== Nigeria women v Ghana ===
7 October 2025
16:00 WAT (UTC+01:00)

Nigeria	40–0	Ghana
Tries: Umude, Iyoha, Akhihiero-Pedro, Akeje (2), Jimoh, Bayere (2); Goals: Umude (1/2), Innocent (3/6)	Report

Alaro City, Lagos
Referee: Chris Dagama (Ghana)

Team details
Nigeria		Position	Ghana
Name	Number	Position	Number	Name
Favour Irmagha	1	FB	1	Celestine Kumah
Blessing Umude	2	WG	2	Eunice Lawoe
Precious Ukwuoma	3	CE	3	Ivy Benyah
Blessing Aladeyely	4	CE	4	Grace Nketiah
Success Iyoha	5	WG	5	Charity Abisitemi Ateng
Rukaykat Akinade	6	SO	6	Jacqueline Ansah
Adaeze Innocent	7	SH	7	Elizabeth Adongo
Adaolisa Onyedika	8	PR	8	Hilaria Wuaku
Becky Okitipe	9	HK	9	Fati Bhom
Chinaza Abbah	10	PF	10	Mariama Musah
Vera Akhihiero-Pedro	11	SR	11	Gracelove Hammond
Catherine Akej	12	SR	12	Minawara Alhassan
Faustina Akeje	13	LF	13	Millicent Njomaba
Rukayat Jimoh	14	IN	14	Christiana Ndewine
Adeola King	15	IN	15	Henrietta Arhin
Muinat Oseni	16	IN	16	Gifty Sowah
Lauretta Bayere	17	IN	17	Maria Tii Pegyine.
Confidence Ibezilim	18	RES	18	Rejoice Osei
Luke Shearman		Coach		Riddick Alibah

11 October 2025
16:00 WAT (UTC+01:00)

Nigeria	24–8	Ghana
Tries: Aladeyely, Bayere, Ukwuoma, Okitipe, Akeje, Obazuaye; Goals: Innocent (0/4), Iyoha (0/2)	Report	Tries: Ansah; Goals: Hammond (2/2)

Alaro City, Lagos
Referee: Olatunbosun Johnson (Nigeria)

Team details
Nigeria		Position	Ghana
Name	Number	Position	Number	Name
Favour Irmagha	1	FB	1	Celestine Kumah
Lauretta Bayere	2	WG	2	Eunice Lawoe
Precious Ukwuoma	3	CE	3	Millicent Njomaba
Blessing Aladeyely	4	CE	4	Maria Til Pegyine
Success Iyoha	5	WG	5	Gifty Sowah
Rukayat Akinade	6	SO	6	Elizabeth Adongo
Adaeze Innocent	7	SH	7	Jacqueline Ansah
Danielle Shobanjo	8	PR	8	Hilaria Wuaku
Becky Okitipe	9	HK	9	Fati Bhom
Aminah Olaniyan	10	PF	10	Christine Ndewine
Abiola Obazuaye	11	SR	11	Minawara Ahassan
Confidence Ibezilim	12	SR	12	Gracelove Hammond
Faustina Akeje	13	LF	13	Grace Nketiah
Muinat Oseni	14	IN	14	Charity Abistemi Ateng
Catherine Ajeje	15	IN	15	Rejoice Osei
Vera Akhihiero-Pedro	16	IN	16	Mary Kesse
Chinaza Abbah	17	IN	17	Tobias Marek
Luke Shearman		Coach		Riddick Alibah

This was intended to be a three match series however the first match, scheduled for 4 October at Rugby School Nigeria, Lagos, was cancelled due to a delay in the construction of the facility.

=== Poland men v Greece in Australia ===
11 October 2025
14:00 AEST (UTC+10:00)

Poland	34–38	Greece
Tries: Forster, Shaw (2), J. Nable, T. Nable, Donnelly; Goals: Siejka (5/6)	Report	Tries: Kikkinos, Kambos (2), N. Tuliatu, Pantelis, Stratis, R. Tuliatu; Goals: Stratis (4/6), Papa (1/1)

St Mary's Stadium, Sydney
Referee: Gage Miles (Australia)

Team details
Poland		Position	Greece
Name	Number	Position	Number	Name
Callum Gromek	1	FB	1	Nick Pantelis
Adam Artsivourtsis	2	WG	2	Samuel Stratis
Evan Artsivourtsis	3	CE	3	Michael Mitsias
Tynan Forster	4	CE	4	Dusan Daniel Cavric
Lachlan Ruba	5	WG	5	Jordan Karakousis
Matthew Stachnik	6	FE/SO	6	Jesse Charman
Harrison Siejka	7	HB/SH	7	Kody Papa
Mitchell Shaw	8	PR	8	Robert Tuliatu
Arek Werstak	9	HK	9	Antonios Zacharia
Braydon Tyburski	10	PF	10	Nicholas Tuliatu
Simon Maslanka	11	SR	11	Jake Kambos
Thomas Nable	12	SR	12	Nathan Vasilou
Archie Donnelly	13	LK/LF	13	James Kikkinos
Jesse Nable	14	IN	14	Zach Kambos
Zayne Forster	15	IN	15	Billy Magoulias
Benjamin Westblade	16	IN	16	Chris Christodoulou
Max Pavlidis	17	IN	17	Nicholas Delimitros
Harry Siejka		Coach		Jim Pizanias

=== Netherlands men v Ukraine ===
12 October 2025
15:00 CEST (UTC+02:00)

Netherlands	12–56	Ukraine
Tries: Koolstra, Schultz; Goals: Koolstra (2/2)	Report	Tries: Ngaronoa (2), Zazimko (3), Kozak, Hromow, Sluvinsky, Beznoshchuk, Skorbach; Goals: Cleary (6/7), Skorbach (2/3)

RC Octopus, Uden
Referee: Hans Verveer (Netherlands)

Team details
Netherlands		Position	Ukraine
Name	Number	Position	Number	Name
Lachlan Van Der Vliet	1	FB	1	Yuri Hromow
Hamish Wragg	2	WG	2	Davyd Zazimko
Hidde Van Der Berg	3	CE	3	Ostap Kozak
Joran Schoenmaker	4	CE	4	Liubomyr Beznoshchuk,
Arie-Tjerk Razoux Schultz	5	WG	5	Orest Adamyk
Kees Kuijpers	6	SO	6	Oleksandr Skorbach
Damon Koolstra	7	SH	7	Jett Cleary
Kwinten Roeleveld	8	PR	8	Volodymyr Karpenko
Maas Van Der Reek	9	HK	9	Owen Hromow
Kevin Ebing	10	PF	10	Ostap Hryshchenko
Mavi Geevers	11	SR	11	Jonah Ngaronoa
Paul Kuijpers	12	SR	12	Zayn Sluvinsky
Tom Van Bokhoven	13	LF	13	Rhys Sciglitano
Max Von Der Stroom	14	IN	14	Daniel Janissen
Francis Appleton	15	IN	15	Vitalli Boichuk
Tom Turnock	16	IN	16	Valerii Popliuk
Sam Kulmpert	17	IN	17	Olkesandr Syvokoz
Dave Hunter		Coach		Dan Beardshaw

=== Men's European Championship ===
==== Euro B ====
18 October 2025
13:30 CEST (UTC+02:00)

Malta	6–36	Netherlands
Tries: Dimech 23'; Goals: Gauci (1/1)	Report	Tries: Geevers 16'; Schoenmaker (2) 20', 40'; Van Der Berg 32'; Koolstra 47'; Roeleveld 65'; Wragg 79'; Goals: Koolstra (4/7)

Marsa Sports Complex, Marsa
Referee: Mickael Lannes (France)

Team details
Malta		Position	Netherlands
Name	Number	Position	Number	Name
Zarrin Galea	1	FB	1	Lachlan Van Der Vliet
Jean Scholey	2	WG	2	Hamish Wragg
Brendan Dalton	3	CE	3	Joran Schoenmaker
Harrison Jewitt	4	CE	4	Hidde Van Der Berg
Kane Tippett	5	WG	5	Dimitri Harringa
Xavier Mamo	6	SO	6	Laury Renac
Kyle Gauci	7	SH	7	Damon Koolstra
Josh Cassar	8	PR	8	Kwinten Roeleveld
Karl Cassar	9	HK	9	Maas Van Der Reek
Jean-Pierre Zarb	10	PF	10	Kevin Ebing
Mark Roberston	11	SR	11	Mavi Geevers
Justin Davenport	12	SR	12	Paul Kuijpers
Kaine Dimech	13	LF	13	Tom Van Bokhoven
Shaun Chircop	14	IN	14	Rik Boats
Terence Galdes	15	IN	15	Sam Kulmpert
Nicky Maylor	16	IN	16	Francis Appleton
Marcus Christians	17	IN	17	Tom Turnock
Philip Humphrey		Coach		Dave Hunter

25 October 2025
17:30 CEST (UTC+02:00)

Netherlands	4–30	Serbia
Tries: Koolstra 34'; Goals: Koolstra (0/1)	Report	Tries: Marjanovic (4) 7', 45', 77' 80'; Trifunovic 18'; Muranka 72'; Goals: Jasari (0/1); Soric (0/1); Ditchman (1/4); Stojilkovic (0/1)

RC Oysters, Oisterwijk
Referee: Stephane Vincent (France)

Team details
Netherlands		Position	Serbia
Name	Number	Position	Number	Name
Lachlan Van Der Vliet	1	FB	1	Jesse Soric
Arie-Tjerk Razoux Schultz	2	WG	2	Andrej Marinkovic
Kees Kuijpers	3	CE	3	Stefan Arsic
Joran Schoenmaker	4	CE	4	Vladimir Milutinovic
Dimitri Harringa	5	WG	5	Dzavid Jasari
Laury Renac	6	SO	6	Niko Djukic
Damon Koolstra	7	SH	7	Vlado Kusic
Mauricio Gomez Pazos	8	PR	8	Vladica Nikolic
Maas Van Der Reek	9	HK	9	Sasha Popovic
Kwinten Roeleveld	10	PF	10	Vladica Nikolic
Sam Kulmpert	11	SR	11	Enis Bibic
Mavi Gevers	12	SR	12	Jason Muranka
Paul Kuijpers	13	LF	13	Lachlan Ditchman
Lars Mudde	14	IN	14	Vuk Štrbac
Tom Turnock	15	IN	15	Djordje Krnjeta
Sylvan Vonken	16	IN	16	Rajko Trifunovic
Joshua Pengel	17	IN	17	Strahinja Stojilkovic
Ruben Stuifzand	18	RES	18	Aleksandar Pavlovic
Dave Hunter		Coach		Darren Fisher

1 November 2025
13:00 CET (UTC+01:00)

Serbia	52–12	Malta
Tries: Marinkovic (2) 8', 40', Djuric (2) 32', 58', Pavlovic 54'; Soric 61'; Muranka 64'; Arsic 71'; Nikolic 78'; Zenuni 80'; Goals: Soric (0/1); Nikolic (1/1); Jasari (5/8)	Report	Tries: Gatt 26'; Jewitt 50'; Goals: Gauci (2/2)

FK BSK Borča, Belgrade

==== Euro C ====
18 October 2025
15:00 CEST (UTC+02:00)

Italy	20–44	Ukraine
Tries: Plati 4'; Piccirilli 24'; Lenzo 74'; Goals: Corte (4/4)	Report	Tries: Vedler (2) 12', 67'; Cleary 17'; Y Hromow 31'; Zazimko (2) 48', 59'; O Hromow 78'; Sciglitano 80'; Goals: Scorbach (5/5), Cleary (1/4)

Pasian di Prato stadium, Udine
Referee: Enzo Peyre (France)

Team details
Italy		Position	Ukraine
Name	Number	Position	Number	Name
Jack Piccirilli	1	FB	1	Yuri Hromow
Emanuele Passera	2	WG	2	David Zazimko
George Stamatatos	3	CE	3	Mykhailo Troian
Andrea Gallinaro	4	CE	4	Liubomyr Beznoschuk
Jackson Lenzo	5	WG	5	Danylo Vedler
Alessandro Corte	6	SO	6	Oleksandr Scorbach
Damian Nati	7	SH	7	Jett Cleary
Davide Colla	8	PR	8	Rhys Sciglitano
Lorenzo Vizzolo	9	HK	9	Owen Hromow
Dominic Biondi	10	PF	10	Volodimir Karpenko
Leonard Plati	11	SR	11	Jonah Ngaronoa
Ikenna Michele Ugwo	12	SR	12	Oleksandr Fomiuk
Nicholas Lenaz	13	LF	13	Victor Tereszko
Francesco Vallone	14	IN	14	Daniel Janissen
Mattia Saoncella	15	IN	15	Dmytro Pokotylo
Ryan Solda	16	IN	16	Ostap Hryshchenko
Francesco Speggiorn	17	IN	17	Ostap Kozak
Leo Epifania		Coach		Dan Beardshaw

22 October 2025
15:00 CEST (UTC+02:00)

Greece	6–34	Ukraine
Tries: Tsagalias 10'; Goals: Tsagalias (1/1)	Report	Tries: Ngaronoa 5'; O Hromow 15'; Sluvinsky 29'; Tereszko 37'; Y Hromow 69'; Popliuk 74'; Goals: Skorbach (4/5), Cleary (1/1)

Pasian di Prato stadium, Udine
Referee: Enzo Peyre (France)

Team details
Greece		Position	Ukraine
Name	Number	Position	Number	Name
Tyrone Tsagalias	1	FB	1	Yuri Hromow
Alexandros Aliu	2	WG	2	Davyd Zazimko
Nick Mougios	3	CE	3	Zayn Sluvinsky
Kostas Katsidonis	4	CE	4	Liubomyr Beznoshchuk
Georgios Chionis	5	WG	5	Danylo Vedler
Leon Bakis	6	SO	6	Oleksandr Skorbach
Eddie Markopoulos	7	SH	7	Jett Cleary
Stephanos Bastas	8	PR	8	Ostap Hryshchenko
Deon Iro	9	HK	9	Owen Hromow
Theodoros Nianiakas	10	PF	10	Volodymyr Karpenko
Aris Koulizakis	11	SR	11	Jonah Ngaronoa
Chris Slater-Raptis	12	SR	12	Oleksandr Fomiuk
Bill Magoulias	13	LF	13	Victor Tereszko
Stephanos Eskioglou	14	IN	14	Daniel Janissen
Panteleimon Tsattalios	15	IN	15	Ostap Kozak
Nikolaos Stefanou	16	IN	16	Dmytro Pokotylo
Aris Dardamanis	17	IN	17	Valerii Popeliuk
Steve Georgallis		Coach		Dan Beardshaw

25 October 2025
15:00 CEST (UTC+02:00)

Italy	14–36	Greece
Tries: Lenaz 2'; Piccirilli 47'; Stamatatos 55'; Goals: Corte (1/3)	Report	Tries: Iro 6'; Linoxylakis 14'; Mougios 18'; Tsagalias (2) 27', 76'; Chionis 62'; Bakis 73'; Markopoulos (2) 33', 52 Goals: Tsagalias (5/9)

Pasian di Prato stadium, Udine
Referee: Enzo Peyre (France)

Team details
Italy		Position	Greece
Name	Number	Position	Number	Name
Jack Piccirilli	1	FB	1	Tyrone Tsagalias
Alessandro Corte	2	WG	2	Alexandros Linoxylakis
Emanuele Passera	3	CE	3	Nick Mougios
Ikenna Michele Ugwo	4	CE	4	Kostas Katsidonis
Ryan Solda	5	WG	5	George Chionis
Jackson Lenzo	6	SO	6	Leon Bakis
Damian Nati	7	SH	7	Eddie Markopoulos
Davide Colla	8	PR	8	Myles Gal
Nicolas Lenaz	9	HK	9	Deon Iro
Dominic Biondi	10	PF	10	Theodoros Nianiakas
George Stamatatos	11	SR	11	Alexandros Aliu
Francesco Speggiorin	12	SR	12	Stefanos Eskioglou
Leonard Plati	13	LF	13	Nicholas Flocas
Mattia Saoncella	14	IN	14	Nikolaos Stefanou
Vincent Fochesato	15	IN	15	Panteliemon Tsattalios
Lorenzo Vizzolo	16	IN	16	Stefanos Bastas
Antonio Obasi	17	IN	17	Aris Koulizakis
Andrea Marchica	18	RES	18	Aris Dardamanis
Leo Epifania		Coach		Steve Georgallis

==== Euro D ====
11 October 2025
14:00 CEST (UTC+02:00)

Norway	86–6	Czech Republic
Tries: Gradert (2) 10', 63'; Mellor-King (3) 13', 57', 60'; Holte (4) 18', 23', 30', 79'; Sagelv 26'; Henriksen (2) 37' 70'; Grindheim 41'; Milligan 67'; Pride 76'; Goals: Mellor-King (2/4); Grindheim (11/11)	1st: 38–6; 2nd: 48–0; Report	Tries: Zámrský 39'; Goals: Cintler (1/1)

Strømmen Stadion, Oslo
Referee: Michael Smaill (New Zealand)

Team details
Norway		Position	Czech Republic
Name	Number	Position	Number	Name
Jakob Øftshus Henriksen	1	FB	1	Roman Richtr
Magnus Lima Soiland	2	WG	2	Tomáš Kasík
Kristoffer Gradert	3	CE	3	Matej Schejbal
Fredrik Skovly	4	CE	4	Josef Brynda
Denis Galic	5	WG	5	Jiri Brynda
Kristoffer Milligan	6	SO	6	Ladislav Cintler
Jymaal Mellor-King	7	SH	7	Daniel Veselý
Mike Pride	8	PR	8	Krystof Pecold
Emil Grindheim	9	HK	9	Tomáš Řičica
Nils Kristian Holte	10	PF	10	Tomáš Adamec
Isuf Peci	11	SR	11	Jakub Denko
Marius Odland Sagelv	12	SR	12	Vit Studecky
Isaac R. Schmidt	13	LF	13	David Bělohlávek
Oliver Falk	14	IN	14	David Slivka
Tygve Hansen	15	IN	15	Jan Zámrský
Eric Mellor	16	IN	16	Adam Mikulas
Sander Milligan	17	IN	17	Tobias Marek
Isaac Schmidt		Coach		Jakub Hudrlík

18 October 2025
13:00 CEST (UTC+02:00)

Czech Republic	10–72	Germany
Tries: Zámrský 15'; Studentlky 70'; Goals: Cintler (1/2)	Report	Tries: Doughton 7'; Schomberg (2) 24', 68'; Smith (2) 29', 75'; McConnell (2) 31', 40'; Wood 36'; Kramer (3) 42', 56', 80'; Ritz-Rahmen 60'; Goals: Billsborough (12/12)

Stadion HZS, Hradec Králové
Referee: Misa Vakadranu (Fiji)

Team details
Czech Republic		Position	Germany
Name	Number	Position	Number	Name
David Stastnik	1	FB	1	George Wood
Roman Richtr	2	WG	2	Fabian Kramer
Tomáš Kasík	3	CE	3	Martin Tormann
Krystof Pecold	4	CE	4	Benedikt Esser
Filip-Daniel Kittl	5	WG	5	Will Hoffmeister
Daniel Veselý	6	SO	6	Liam Doughton
Jakub Hrdlick	7	SH	7	Brad Billsborough
Jan Zámrský	8	PR	8	Mawuli Amefia
Ladislav Cintler	9	HK	9	Harry Cartwright
Tobias Marek	10	PF	10	Dany Doukeng
Vit Studentlky	11	SR	11	Shaun Smith
David Bělohlávek	12	SR	12	Eoin Bowie
Tomas Adamec	13	LF	13	Josh McConnell
Jaroslav Novotny	14	IN	14	Jimmy Adams
Martin Nasticky	15	IN	15	Alex Nyahoe
Josef Brynda	16	IN	16	Angus Ritz-Rahmen
Matej Schejbal	17	IN	17	Hagen Schomberg
Jakub Hudrlík		Coach		Andy Hay

25 October 2025
14:00 CEST (UTC+02:00)

Germany	32–18	Norway
Tries: Billsborough 4'; Kurz 6'; Tetley 18', Rau 50'; McConnell 61'; Goals: Billsborough (6/7)	Report	Tries: Hansen 18'; Mellor-King 54'; Milligan 70'; Gradert 79'; Goals: Mellor-King (1/3); Grindheim (0/1)

Sportplatz Welper, Hattingen
Referee: Hans Verveer (Netherlands)

Team details
Germany		Position	Norway
Name	Number	Position	Number	Name
Jimmy Adams	1	FB	1	Magnus Lima Soiland
Fabian Kramer	2	WG	2	Denis Galic
Fabian Wendt	3	CE	3	Kristoffer Gradert
Felix Rau	4	CE	4	Fredrik Skovly
Linus Kurz	5	WG	5	Trygve Hansen
Liam Doughton	6	SO	6	Kristoffer Milligan
Brad Billsborough	7	SH	7	Jymaal Mellor-King
Mawuli Amefia	8	PR	8	Marius Odland Sagelv
Harry Cartwright	9	HK	9	Emil Grindheim
Hagen Schomberg	10	PF	10	Nils Kristian Holte
Eoin Bowie	11	SR	11	Matt South
Shaun Smith	12	SR	12	Isuf Peci
Josh McConnell	13	LF	13	Isaac R. Schmidt
Alex Nyahoe	14	IN	14	Sander Milligan
Dany Doukeng Kongmo Ngo	15	IN	15	Eric Mellor
Martin Apostel	16	IN	16	William Giddings
Charlie Tetley	17	IN	17	Sveinung Fludal
Benedikt Esser	18	RES	18	Idar Kjaerstad
Andy Hay		Coach		Isaac Schmidt

=== France men v Australia ===
A fixture between France and Australia on the weekend of 18/19 October had been proposed as a warm-up for both teams ahead of France's World Cup qualifier and Australia's Ashes Series. The game however was vetoed by Australia's Rugby League Players Association and was replaced with two joint training sessions in London.

=== 2025 Pacific Championships ===
==== Group stage ====
19 October 2025
18:05 NZDT (UTC+13:00)

New Zealand	24–18	Samoa
Tries: 4 McLean 9', 21'; Timoko 40'; Brown 73'; Goals: 4 Isaako 11', 23', pen 63', 74' (4/5)	1st: 16–12; 2nd: 8–6; Report	Tries: 3 Mariner 26'; Sasagi 32'; Taulagi 69'; Goals: 3 Talagi 28', 34', 71' (3/3)

Mount Smart Stadium, Auckland
Attendance: 21,251
Referee: Peter Gough
Touch judges: Drew Oultram, Wyatt Raymond
Player of the Match: Dylan Brown (New Zealand)

Team details
New Zealand		Position	Samoa
Name	Number	Position	Number	Name
Charnze Nicoll-Klokstad	1	FB	1	Roger Tuivasa-Sheck
Jamayne Isaako	2	WG	2	Brian To'o
Matthew Timoko	3	CE	3	Izack Tago
Casey McLean	4	CE	4	Deine Mariner
Ronaldo Mulitalo	5	WG	5	Murray Taulagi
Dylan Brown	6	FE	6	Blaize Talagi
Kieran Foran	7	HB	7	Jarome Luai (c)
James Fisher-Harris (c)	8	PR	8	Josh Papali'i
Jeremy Marshall-King	9	HK	9	Jazz Tevaga
Moses Leota	10	PF	10	Payne Haas
Briton Nikora	11	SR	11	Jeremiah Nanai
Isaiah Papali'i	12	SR	12	Jaydn Su'A
Joseph Tapine	13	LK	13	Junior Paulo (c)
Phoenix Crossland	14	IN	14	Chanel Harris-Tavita
Naufahu Whyte	15	IN	15	Simi Sasagi
Erin Clark	16	IN	17	Francis Molo
Nelson Asofa-Solomona	17	IN	19	Ata Mariota
Xavier Willison	18	RES	18	Benaiah Ioelu
Stacey Jones		Coach		Ben Gardiner

26 October 2025
15:00 AEST (UTC+10:00)

Tonga	6–34	Samoa
Tries: 1 Koula 78'; Goals: 1 Katoa 78' (1/1)	1st: 0–12; 2nd: 6–22; Report	Tries: 6 Nanai 28', 46'; Tago 8'; Taulagi 61'; Haas 65'; Harris-Tavita 75'; Goals: 5 Talagi pen 18', 29', 63', 66', 77' (5/7)

Lang Park, Brisbane
Attendance: 44,682
Referee: Todd Smith
Player of the Match: Junior Paulo (Samoa)

Team details
Tonga		Position	Samoa
Name	Number	Position	Number	Name
Lehi Hopoate	1	FB	1	Roger Tuivasa-Sheck
Daniel Tupou	2	WG	2	Brian To'o
Toluta'u Koula	3	CE	3	Izack Tago
Robert Toia	4	CE	4	Deine Mariner
Sione Katoa	5	WG	5	Murray Taulagi
Isaiah Iongi	6	FE	6	Blaize Talagi
Isaiya Katoa	7	HB	7	Jarome Luai (c)
Addin Fonua-Blake (c)	8	PR	17	Francis Molo
Siliva Havili	9	HK	15	Benaiah Ioelu
Stefano Utoikamanu	10	PF	10	Payne Haas
Leka Halasima	15	SR	11	Jeremiah Nanai
Eliesa Katoa	12	SR	12	Simi Sasagi
Felise Kaufusi	16	LK	13	Junior Paulo (c)
Siua Wong	11	IN	8	Josh Papali'i
Soni Luke	14	IN	9	Jazz Tevaga
Moeaki Fotuaika	17	IN	14	Chanel Harris-Tavita
Demetric Vaimauga	18	IN	20	Terrell May
Paul Alamoti	19	RES	16	Ativalu Lisati
Kristian Woolf		Coach		Ben Gardiner

2 November 2025
18:05 NZDT (UTC+13:00)

New Zealand	40–14	Tonga
Tries: 7 Brown 23', 64'; Kini 18'; McLean 28'; Timoko 36'; Nicoll-Klokstad 51'; Crossland 70'; Goals: 6 Isaako 19', 25', 29', 37', 43', 66' (6/8); Sin bin: Erin Clark (yellow card) 40' to 50'	1st: 24-2; 2nd: 16-12; Report	Tries: 2 Vaimauga 48'; Tupou 75'; Goals: 3 Katoa 39', 49', 75' (3/3)

Eden Park, Auckland
Attendance: 38,114
Referee: Ashley Klein
Player of the Match: Dylan Brown (New Zealand)

Team details
New Zealand		Position	Tonga
Name	Number	Position	Number	Name
Charnze Nicoll-Klokstad	1	FB	1	Lehi Hopoate
Jamayne Isaako	2	WG	2	Daniel Tupou
Matthew Timoko	3	CE	19	Will Penisini
Casey McLean	4	CE	4	Paul Alamoti
Keano Kini	20	WG	5	Sione Katoa
Dylan Brown	6	FE	6	Isaiah Iongi
Kieran Foran	7	HB	7	Isaiya Katoa
James Fisher-Harris (c)	8	PR	8	Addin Fonua-Blake (c)
Phoenix Crossland	9	HK	9	Siliva Havili
Moses Leota	10	PF	16	Moeaki Fotuaika
Briton Nikora	11	SR	11	Eliesa Katoa
Isaiah Papali'i	12	SR	15	Kulikefu Finefeuiaki
Joseph Tapine	13	LK	13	Jason Taumalolo (c)
Te Maire Martin	14	IN	10	Felise Kaufusi
Naufahu Whyte	15	IN	12	Siua Wong
Erin Clark	16	IN	14	Soni Luke
Xavier Willison	17	IN	17	Demetric Vaimauga
Nelson Asofa-Solomona	18	RES	18	Leka Halasima
Stacey Jones		Coach		Kristian Woolf

==== Men's final ====
9 November 2025
16:05 AEDT (UTC+11:00)

New Zealand	36–14	Samoa
Tries: 6 Papali'i 49', 76'; Whyte 33'; Clark 56'; McLean 67'; Nicoll-Klokstad 78'; Goals: 6 Isaako 34', 50', pen 53', 58', pen 75', 79' (6/8)	1st: 6-14; 2nd: 30-0; Report	Tries: 2 To'o 11'; Sasagi 28'; Goals: 3 Talagi 12', 30', pen 40' (3/3)

Western Sydney Stadium, Sydney
Attendance: 28,084
Referee: Ashley Klein
Video referee: Chris Butler
Touch judges: Drew Oultram, Dave Munro
Player of the Match: Dylan Brown (New Zealand)

Team details
New Zealand		Position	Samoa
Name	Number	Position	Number	Name
Keano Kini	1	FB	1	Roger Tuivasa-Sheck
Jamayne Isaako	2	WG	2	Brian To'o
Matthew Timoko	3	CE	3	Izack Tago
Charnze Nicoll-Klokstad	4	CE	4	Deine Mariner
Casey McLean	5	WG	5	Murray Taulagi
Dylan Brown	6	FE	6	Blaize Talagi
Kieran Foran	7	HB	7	Jarome Luai (c)
James Fisher-Harris (c)	8	PR	8	Francis Molo (c)
Phoenix Crossland	9	HK	9	Jazz Tevaga
Moses Leota	10	PF	10	Payne Haas
Briton Nikora	11	SR	11	Jaydn Su'A
Isaiah Papali'i	12	SR	12	Simi Sasagi
Joseph Tapine	13	LK	13	Junior Paulo (c)
Te Maire Martin	14	IN	14	Chanel Harris-Tavita
Naufahu Whyte	15	IN	15	Benaiah Ioelu
Erin Clark	16	IN	16	Terrell May
Xavier Willison	17	IN	17	Josh Papali'i
Scott Sorensen (not used)	18	RES	18	Ata Mariota (not used)
Stacey Jones		Coach		Ben Gardiner

==== Men's Pacific Bowl ====
18 October 2025
15:00 PNGST (UTC+10:00)

Fiji	44–24	Cook Islands
Tries: 8 Bula 5', 8', 12', 37'; Navale 20'; Kautoga 60'; Donoghoe 66'; Saukuru 76'; Goals: 6 Wakeham 6', 10', 14', 21', 62', 67' (6/8)	1st: 28–6; 2nd: 16–18; Report	Tries: 4 Iro 26'; Makirere 54'; Rennie 63'; Petterson-Robati 79'; Goals: 4 Ioka 28', 55', 64', 79' (4/4)

PNG Football Stadium, Port Moresby
Referee: Liam Kennedy

Team details
Fiji		Position	Cook Islands
Name	Number	Position	Number	Name
Jahream Bula	1	FB	6	Caelys-Paul Putoko
Sunia Turuva	2	WG	2	Paul Ulberg
Semi Valemei	3	CE	3	KL Iro (c)
Michael Jennings	4	CE	4	Reubenn Rennie
Jethro Rinakama	5	WG	5	Esom Ioka
Kurt Donoghoe	6	FE	1	Esan Marsters
Brandon Wakeham	7	HB	7	Cassius Cowley
Tui Kamikamica (c)	8	PR	8	Makahesi Makatoa
Penioni Tagituimua	9	HK	9	Mason Teague
Michael Waqa	10	PF	10	Tepai Moeroa
Taane Milne	11	SR	11	Brendan Piakura
Kitione Kautoga	12	SR	12	Reuben Porter
Caleb Navale	13	LK	13	Pride Petterson-Robati
Terrell Kalo Kalo	14	IN	14	Rua Ngatikaura
Solomone Saukuru	15	IN	16	Brody Tamarua
Keresi Maya	16	IN	17	Rhys Dakin
Kylan Mafoa	17	IN	20	Justin Makirere
Ronald Phillitoga	18	RES	18	Delahia Wigmore
Wise Kativerata		Coach		Karmichael Hunt

25 October 2025
15:00 PNGST (UTC+10:00)

Papua New Guinea	40–28	Cook Islands
Tries: 7 Derby 12', 31'; Martin 26'; Johnston 35'; Laybutt 55'; Morea 66'; Voro 79'; Goals: 6 Martin 13', 27', 36', 56', 67' (5/6); Laybutt 80' (1/1); Sin bin: Martin (yellow card) 79' to 80'	1st: 22–12; 2nd: 18–16; Report	Tries: 5 Ngatikaura 4'; Rennie 19'; Putoko 51'; Ioka 60'; Wigmore 73'; Goals: 4 Ioka 6', 20', 62', 74' (4/5)

PNG Football Stadium, Port Moresby
Attendance: 14,864
Referee: Gerard Sutton

Team details
Papua New Guinea		Position	Cook Islands
Name	Number	Position	Number	Name
Morea Morea	1	FB	1	Esan Marsters
Robert Derby	2	WG	2	Paul Ulberg
Zac Laybutt	3	CE	3	KL Iro (c)
Nene MacDonald	4	CE	4	Reubenn Rennie
Alex Johnston	5	WG	5	Esom Ioka
Gairo Voro	6	SO/FE	6	Caelys-Paul Putoko
Lachlan Lam (c)	7	SH/HB	7	Cassius Cowley
Epel Kapinias	8	PR	8	Makahesi Makatoa
Edwin Ipape	9	HK	9	Mason Teague
Jack de Belin	10	PF	10	Tepai Moeroa
Rhyse Martin	11	SR	11	Brendan Piakura
Nixon Putt	12	SR	12	Reuben Porter
Liam Horne	13	LF/LK	13	Pride Petterson-Robati
Finley Glare	14	IN	14	Rua Ngatikaura
Jacob Alick-Wiencke	15	IN	17	Rhys Dakin
Cooper Bai	16	IN	18	Delahia Wigmore
Sylvester Namo	17	IN	20	Justin Makirere
Robert Mathias	18	RES	19	Teapo Stoltman
Jason Demetriou		Coach		Karmichael Hunt

1 November 2025
15:00 PNGST (UTC+10:00)

Papua New Guinea	50–18	Fiji
Tries: 8 Morea 10'; Ipape 10'; MacDonald 16'; Martin 20'; Bai 26'; Putt 50'; Dotoi 61'; Mathias 66'; Goals: 9 Martin 11', 15', 17', 21', 28', 52', 62', 67', pen 79' (9/9)	1st: 30-6; 2nd: 20-12; Report	Tries: 4 Kautoga 36', 46'; Saukuru 58'; Valemei 76'; Goals: 1 Wakeham 37' (1/4)

PNG Football Stadium, Port Moresby
Attendance: 12,046
Referee: Adam Gee

Team details
Papua New Guinea		Position	Fiji
Name	Number	Position	Number	Name
Morea Morea	1	FB	1	Jahream Bula
Dudley Dotoi	2	WG	2	Sunia Turuva
Zac Laybutt	3	CE	3	Jope Rauqe
Nene MacDonald	4	CE	4	Semi Valemei
Alex Johnston	5	WG	5	Ronald Phillitoga
Gairo Voro	6	FE	6	Kurt Donoghoe
Finley Glare	7	HB	7	Brandon Wakeham
Epel Kapinias	8	PR	8	Tui Kamikamica (c)
Edwin Ipape	9	HK	9	Penioni Tagituimua
Valentine Richard	10	PF	17	Kylan Mafoa
Rhyse Martin (c)	11	SR	11	Taane Milne
Nixon Putt	12	SR	12	Kitione Kautoga
Jack de Belin	13	LK	13	Caleb Navale
Lachlan Lam (c)	7	IN	14	Terrell Kalo Kalo
Robert Mathias	15	IN	15	Solomone Saukuru
Cooper Bai	16	IN	16	Ben Nakubuwai
Sylvester Namo	17	IN	19	Keresi Maya
Liam Horne	18	RES	18	Akuila Qoro
Jason Demetriou		Coach		Wise Kativerata

==== Women's Pacific Cup ====
NB: All matches played to Australia's 70 minute rule for women's rugby league.

==== Group stage ====
19 October 2025
15:35 NZDT (UTC+13:00)

New Zealand	22–20	Samoa
Tries: 4 Parker 44'; Quinlan 48'; Tauaneai 50'; Hufanga 64'; Goals: 3 Maliepo 49', 51', 64' (3/4)	1st: 0–20; 2nd: 22–0; Report	Tries: 4 Sauaso 13'; Masaga 21'; Mino-Sinapati 27'; Papali'i 32'; Goals: 2 Piliae-Rasabale 14', 33' (2/4)

Mount Smart Stadium, Auckland
Attendance: 12,571
Referee: Belinda Sharpe
Touch judges: Phil Henderson, Paki Parkinson
Player of the Match: Shalom Sauaso (Samoa)

Team details
New Zealand		Position	Samoa
Name	Number	Position	Number	Name
Apii Nicholls	1	FB	1	Jetaya Faifua
Shanice Parker	2	WG	2	Jessica Patea
Abigail Roache	3	CE	3	Sarina Masaga
Mele Hufanga	4	CE	4	Lindsay Tui
Tysha Ikenasio	5	WG	5	Destiny Mino-Sinapati
Patricia Maliepo	6	FE	6	Taliah Fuimaono
Raecene McGregor (c)	7	HB	7	Pauline Piliae-Rasabale
Angelina Teakaaranga-Katoa	8	PR	8	Annetta Nu'uausala (c)
Brooke Anderson	9	HK	9	Destiny Brill
Brianna Clark	10	PF	10	Eliza Lopamaua
Annessa Biddle	11	SR	11	Ryvrr Lee-Alo
Shakira Baker	12	SR	12	Tavarna Papalii
Georgia Hale (c)	13	LK	13	Sienna Lofipo
Ashleigh Quinlan	14	IN	14	Pihuka Berryman-Duff
Otesa Pule	15	IN	15	Laikha Clarke
Alexis Tauaneai	16	IN	16	Ella-Jaye Harrison-Leaunoa
Ivana Lauitiiti	17	IN	17	Shalom Sauaso
Tiana Davison	18	RES	18	Simone Karpani
Ricky Henry		Coach		Jamie Soward

26 October 2025
13:00 AEST (UTC+10:00)

Australia	60–0	Samoa
Tries: 11; Sergis 6', 8'; Upton 19', 62'; Kernick 22'; Robinson 31', 50'; Dodd 38'; Clydsdale 41'; Whitfeld 60'; Apps 67'; Goals: 8 Southwell 9', 21', 23', 40', 42', 52', 64', 68' (8/11)	1st: 26–0; 2nd: 34–0; Report	Sin bin: Mino-Sinapati (yellow card) 13' to 23'

Lang Park, Brisbane
Attendance: 30,842
Referee: Kasey Badger
Player of the Match: Tamika Upton (Australia)

Team details
Australia		Position	Samoa
Name	Number	Position	Number	Name
Tamika Upton	1	FB	1	Destiny Mino-Sinapati
Julia Robinson	2	WG	2	Jessica Patea
Isabelle Kelly	3	CE	3	Lindsay Tui
Tiana Penitani	4	CE	4	Sarina Masaga
Jessica Sergis	5	WG	5	Mercedez Taulelei-Siala
Ali Brigginshaw (c)	6	FE	6	Taliah Fuimaono
Jesse Southwell	7	HB	7	Jetaya Faifua
Rima Butler	8	PR	8	Annetta Nu'uausala (c)
Keeley Davis	9	HK	9	Destiny Brill
Jessika Elliston	10	PF	10	Eliza Lopamaua
Kezie Apps (c)	11	SR	11	Tavarna Papalii
Yasmin Clydsdale	12	SR	12	Ryvrr-Lee Alo
Olivia Kernick	13	LK	17	Shalom Sauaso
Quincy Dodd	14	IN	13	Pihuka Berryman-Duff
Keilee Joseph	15	IN	14	Ella-Jaye Harrison-Leaunoa
Ellie Johnston	16	IN	15	Laikha Clarke
Jakiya Whitfeld	17	IN	16	Jaydika Tafua
Sarah Togatuki	18	RES	18	Simone Karpani
Jess Skinner		Coach		Jamie Soward

2 November 2025
15:35 NZDT (UTC+13:00)

New Zealand	4–10	Australia
Tries: 1 Biddle 50'; Goals: 0 McGregor (0/1)	1st: 0-6; 2nd: 4-4; Report	Tries: 2 Sergis 31'; Church 42'; Goals: 1 Southwell 32' (1/2)

Eden Park, Auckland
Attendance: 19,154
Referee: Belinda Sharpe
Player of the Match: Abbi Church (Australia)

Team details
New Zealand		Position	Australia
Name	Number	Position	Number	Name
Apii Nicholls	1	FB	19	Abbi Church
Shanice Parker	2	WG	2	Julia Robinson
Abigail Roache	3	CE	3	Isabelle Kelly
Mele Hufanga	4	CE	4	Tiana Penitani
Leianne Tufuga	5	WG	5	Jessica Sergis
Patricia Maliepo	6	FE	6	Ali Brigginshaw (c)
Raecene McGregor (c)	7	HB	7	Jesse Southwell
Angelina Teakaaranga-Katoa	8	PR	8	Ellie Johnston
Brooke Anderson	9	HK	9	Keeley Davis
Tiana Davison	10	PF	10	Jessika Elliston
Annessa Biddle	11	SR	11	Kezie Apps (c)
Otesa Pule	12	SR	12	Yasmin Clydsdale
Georgia Hale (c)	13	LK	13	Olivia Kernick
Ashleigh Quinlan	14	IN	14	Quincy Dodd
Shaniece Monschau	15	IN	15	Keilee Joseph
Alexis Tauaneai	16	IN	16	Rima Butler
Ivana Lauitiiti	17	IN	17	Sarah Togatuki
Tyla King	18	RES	18	Jakiya Whitfeld
Ricky Henry		Coach		Jess Skinner

==== Women's final ====
9 November 2025
13:30 AEDT (UTC+11:00)

Australia	40–8	New Zealand
Tries: 7 Robinson 13', 70'; Kernick 3'; Joseph 25'; Sergis 32'; Upton 49'; Johnston 63'; Goals: 6 Southwell 5', 15', 26', 34', 50', 65' (6/7)	1st: 24–0; 2nd: 16–8; Report	Tries: 2 Parker 41'; Ikenasio 52'; Goals: 0 Nicholls (0/2); Sin bin: Quinlan (yellow card) 25' to 35'; Lauitiiti (yellow card) 60' to 70'

Western Sydney Stadium, Sydney
Attendance: 17,702
Referee: Belinda Sharpe
Video referee: Adam Gee
Touch judges: Phil Henderson, Ziggy Przeklasa-Adamski
Player of the Match: Julia Robinson (Australia)

Team details
Australia		Position	New Zealand
Name	Number	Position	Number	Name
Tamika Upton	1	FB	1	Apii Nicholls
Julia Robinson	2	WG	2	Tysha Ikenasio
Isabelle Kelly	3	CE	3	Abigail Roache
Tiana Penitani	4	CE	4	Mele Hufanga
Jakiya Whitfeld	5	WG	5	Shanice Parker
Ali Brigginshaw (c)	6	FE	6	Ashleigh Quinlan
Jesse Southwell	7	HB	7	Raecene McGregor (c)
Ellie Johnston	8	PR	8	Tiana Davison
Olivia Higgins	9	HK	9	Brooke Anderson
Jessika Elliston	10	PF	10	Angelina Teakaaranga-Katoa
Kezie Apps (c)	11	SR	11	Annessa Biddle
Yasmin Clydsdale	12	SR	12	Otesa Pule
Olivia Kernick	13	LK	13	Georgia Hale (c)
Quincy Dodd	14	IN	14	Tyla King
Keilee Joseph	15	IN	15	Shaniece Monschau
Jessica Sergis	16	IN	16	Alexis Tauaneai
Rima Butler	17	IN	17	Ivana Lauitiiti
Sarah Togatuki (not used)	18	RES	18	Shakira Baker (not used)
Jess Skinner		Coach		Ricky Henry

==== Women's Pacific Bowl ====
NB: All matches played to Australia's 70 minute rule for women's rugby league.

18 October 2025
13:00 PNGST (UTC+10:00)

Papua New Guinea	6–34	Cook Islands
Tries: 1 Veivers 7'; Goals: 1 Veivers 8' (1/1)	1st: 6–20; 2nd: 0–14; Report	Tries: 7 Morris-Ponga 11', 21', 65'; Kiria-Ratu 13'; Makira 33'; Paitai 42'; Matua 59'; Goals: Kiria-Ratu 12', 15', 60' (3/7)

PNG Football Stadium, Port Moresby
Referee: Todd Smith

Team details
Papua New Guinea		Position	Cook Islands
Name	Number	Position	Number	Name
Fleur Ginn	1	FB	1	Kiana Takairangi (c)
Ruth Gende	20	WG	2	Paulina Morris-Ponga
Tia Molo	3	CE	3	Kiarah Siauane
Marie Biyama	4	CE	4	Deleni Paitai
Naomi Kelly	5	WG	5	Hannah Makira
India Seeto	6	FE	6	Lydia Turua-Quedley
Caitlin Tanner	7	HB	7	Charntay Kiria-Ratu
Elsie Albert (c)	8	PR	8	Lavinia Kitai
Emily Veivers	14	HK	9	Pearl Tuitama
Jessikah Reeves	13	PF	15	Ashlee Matapo
Sareka Mooka	11	SR	11	Anne-Marie Kiria-Ratu
Leila Kerowa	12	SR	19	Kaiyah Atai
Gloria Kaupa	16	LK	13	Jazmon Tupou-Witchman
Therese Aiton	9	IN	10	April Ngatapuna
Emmogen Taumafai	10	IN	14	Kerehitina Matua
Essay Banu	15	IN	16	Ngatokotoru Arakua
Belinda Gwasamun	19	IN	17	Memory Paitai
Mya Muller	17	RES	18	Porche John
Tahnee Norris		Coach		Ron Griffiths

25 October 2025
13:00 PNGST (UTC+10:00)

Cook Islands	42–24	Tonga
Tries: 8 Matua 49', 63'; Siauane 58', 69'; Paitai 19'; Tupou-Witchman 29'; Morris-Ponga 34'; Arakua 35'; Goals: 5 Kiria-Ratu 21', 31', 37', 51', 69' (5/8)	1st: 16–10; 2nd: 26–14; Report	Tries: 5 Paki 6'; Lokotui 9'; Mailangi 39'; Courtenay 42'; Muru 53'; Goals: 2 Paki 8', 40' (2/5)

PNG Football Stadium, Port Moresby
Referee: Ziggy Przeklasa-Adamski

Team details
Cook Islands		Position	Tonga
Name	Number	Position	Number	Name
Kiana Takairangi (c)	1	FB	1	Ana Malupo
Kiarah Siauane	2	WG	2	Moana Courtenay
Keira Rangi	3	CE	3	Fane Finau
Deleni Paitai	4	CE	4	Martha Mataele
Paulina Morris-Ponga	5	WG	5	Simina Lokotui
Lydia Turua-Quedley	6	FE	6	Malia Tuifua
Chantay Kiria-Ratu	7	HB	7	Emmanita Paki
Lavinia Kitai	8	PR	8	Natasha Penitani (c)
Pearl Tuitama	9	HK	9	Seli Mailangi
Ashlee Matapo	10	PF	10	Kalosipani Hopoate
Anne-Marie Kiria-Ratu	11	SR	11	Shannon Muru
Kaiyah Atai	19	SR	12	Manilita Takapautolo
Jazmon Tupou-Witchman	13	LK	13	Amelia Huakau
Kerehitina Matua	14	IN	14	Kaylani Tavita
Porche John	15	IN	15	Jade Fonua
Ngatoktoru Arakua	16	IN	16	Tatiana Finau
Jodeci Joseph	17	IN	17	Ruby Fifita
Memory Paitai	18	RES	18	Pauline Suli-Ruka
Ron Griffiths		Coach		Meg Ward

1 November 2025
13:00 PNGST (UTC+10:00)

Papua New Guinea	6–42	Tonga
Tries: 1 Kelly 16'; Goals: 1 Veivers 18'	1st: 6-18; 2nd: 0-24; Report	Tries: 9 Mataele 32', 61', 69'; Courtenay 2'; Fifita 7'; Hopoate 22'; Tuifua 37'; Fonua 41'; Lokotui 53'; Goals: 3 Paki 8', 39', 43' (3/9)

PNG Football Stadium, Port Moresby

Team details
Papua New Guinea		Position	Tonga
Name	Number	Position	Number	Name
Fleur Ginn	1	FB	1	Ana Malupo
Ruth Gende	2	WG	2	Moana Courtenay
Tia Molo	3	CE	3	Fane Finau
Relna Wuruki-Hosea	4	CE	4	Martha Mataele
Naomi Kelly	5	WG	5	Simina Lokotui
India Seeto	6	FE	6	Malia Tuifua
Caitlin Tanner	7	HB	7	Emmanita Paki
Elsie Albert (c)	8	PR	8	Natasha Penitani (c)
Emily Veivers	9	HK	9	Seli Mailangi
Gloria Kaupa	10	PF	17	Ruby Fifita
Sareka Mooka	11	SR	11	Shannon Muru
Marie Biyama	16	SR	16	Tatiana Finau
Jessikah Reeves	13	LK	13	Amelia Huakau
Mya Muller	12	IN	10	Kalosipani Hopoate
Therese Aiton	14	IN	15	Jade Fonua
Emmogen Taumafai	15	IN	18	Pauline Suli-Ruka
Belinda Gwasamun	17	IN	20	Paea Uilou
Mala Mark	18	RES	21	Vanessa Foliaki
Tahnee Norris		Coach		Meg Ward

=== Scotland wheelchair v Ireland ===
18 October 2025
13:00 BST (UTC+01:00)

Scotland	6–58	Ireland
Tries: Owen; Goals: Willans (1/1)	1st: 6–22; 2nd: 0–36; Report	Tries: Johnston (4), Burton-Carter (2), Griffith (31), Horgan (2), Spain, Calcott; Goals: Johnston (4/5), Horgan (3/4), Martin (0/2)

Oriam Performance Centre, Heriot-Watt University, Edinburgh
Referees: Matthew Ball, Karli Wilkinson (England)

Team details
Scotland		Position	Ireland
Name	Number	Position	Number	Name
David Hill	1	Starter	1	Joe Calcott
Olivia Foulton	2	Starter	2	Tom Burton-Carter
Max Owen	3	Starter	3	Melanie Griffiths
Calum Davidson	4	Starter	4	Cian Horgan
John Willans	5	Starter	5	Peter Johnston
Hamish Douglas	6	Interchange	6	Tom Martin
Calum Japes	7	Interchange	7	Oran Spain
Sarah Devlin	8	Interchange	8	Cormac Downey
Martyn Gill		Coach		Phil Roberts

=== Women's tri-series ===
18 October 2025
13:00 BST (UTC+01:00)

England Amateurs	18–4†	Scotland
Tries: Hood, Bentley, Singleton, Costello; Goals: Thomas (1/4)	Report	Tries: Lackie

Ruskin Drive, St Helens
Referee: Esmai Wright (England)

Team details
England Community Lions		Position	Scotland
Name	Number	Position	Number	Name
Angel Bentley	1	FB	1	Rebecca Smart
Demi Thomas	2	WG	2	Rebecca Smart
Jasmine Wilson	3	CE	3	Sarah Smart
Sophie Banks	4	CE	4	Enya Lackie
Kasa Gaunavinaka	5	WG	5	Olivia Barnard
Olivia Grace	6	SO	6	Evie Tonkin
Ellie Costello	7	SH	7	Demi Fisher
Kayleigh Waller	8	PR	8	Isabel Glover
Abbie Singleton	9	HK	9	Kaiya Glynn
Jessie Hood	10	PF	10	Morgan Pearson
Katie Evans	11	SR	11	Grace Field
Hannah Watt	12	SR	12	Ciorstaidh Ainsworth
Danielle Waters	13	LF	13	Robyn Bell Soppelsa
Alyssa Courtney	14	IN	14	Emma Welsford
Jade Smalley	15	IN	15	Cerys Gregory
Lisa Box	16	IN	16	Georgia Briggs
Kaitlin Varley	17	IN	17	Megan Mayhew-Beach
Honey Oxtoby	18	Interchange	18	Rebecca White
Maddison Price	19	RES	19	Betti Ginnelly
		IN	20	Abi Gordon
		IN	21	Stephanie Gray
Pete Grayburn		Coach		John Whalley

25 October 2025
14:00 BST (UTC+01:00)

England Amateurs	38–6†	Jamaica
Tries: Walters, Wilson, Thomas, Banks, Courtney, Varley, Waller, Oxtoby; Goals: Thomas (3/8)	Report	Tries: Lewis; Drop goals: Tresize (1/1)

Pilkington Recs, St Helens
Referee: Liam Breheny (England)

Team details
England Community Lions		Position	Jamaica
Name	Number	Position	Number	Name
Angel Bentley	1	FB	1	Gianna Noble-Cunningham
Kasa Gaunavinaka	2	WG	2	Makeda Lewis
Sophie Banks	3	CE	3	Sophie Robinson
Jasmine Wilson	4	CE	4	Taneisha Whalley
Demi Thomas	5	WG	5	Darcey Price
Olivia Grace	6	SO	6	Hannah McPherson
Ellie Costello	7	SH	7	Elyse Royal
Jessie Hood	8	PR	8	Natty Laing
Abbie Singleton	9	HK	9	Emily Bell
Lisa Box	10	PF	10	Sienna McPherson
Hannah Watt	11	SR	11	Eleanor Tresize
Katie Evans	12	SR	12	Tahnika Talbot
Danielle Waters	13	LF	13	Maica Laing
Subs: Alyssa Courtney	14	IN	14	Subs: Tian Simms
Jade Smalley	15	IN	15	Rhys Morgan
Kaitlin Varley	16	IN	16	Kiera Bernard
Honey Oxtoby	17	IN	17	Kaya-Jo Laing
Maddison Price	18	Interchange	18	Rose Johnson
Hannah Quirk	19	RES
Kayleigh Waller	20	IN
Pete Grayburn		Coach		Darren Collins

1 November 2025
12:00 BST (UTC+01:00)

Scotland	38–12	Jamaica
Tries: Tonkin, S. Smart, Field (2), Whelsford, Aquilina, Glynn; Goals: S. Smart (5/7)	1st: 16–12; 2nd: 22–0; Report	Tries: Lewis, Noble-Cunningham; Goals: Trezier (2/2)

Millpond Stadium, Featherstone

Team details
Scotland		Position	Jamaica
Name	Number	Position	Number	Name
Rebecca Smart	1	FB	1	Alexis Smith
Sarah Smart	2	WG	2	Gianna Noble-Cunningham
Enya Lackie	3	CE	3	Makada Lewis
Evie Tonkin	4	CE	4	Tahnika Talbot
Raphaella Aquilina	5	WG	5	Tanisha Whalley
Emma Welsford	6	SO	6	Chevelle Clarke
Isabel Glover	7	SH	7	Hannah McPerson
Grace Field	8	PR	8	Natalia Laing
Cerys Gregory	9	HK	9	Emily Bell
Georgia Briggs	10	PF	10	Darcey Price
Kaiya Glynn	11	SR	11	Sienna McPherson
Ciorstadia Ainsworth	12	SR	12	Elenor Trezier
Nicole Stewart	13	LF	13	Sophine Robinson
Morgan Pearson	14	IN	14	Elyse Royal
Robyn Price	15	IN	15	Maica-Vee Laing
Rebecca White	16	IN	16	Kaya-Jo Laing
Steph Gray	17	IN	17	Rhys Morgan
		RES
Andy Picton		Coach		Darren Collins

=== Japan men v Niue ===
19 October 2025

Japan	8–58†	Niue
Tries: Louw, Iwanabe; Goals: Yoshitomi (0/2)	Report	Tries: S.Perenara (2), Perenara-Livapulu (2), K.Perenara (2), Seini, Togiafofoa, Kaufononga, Siumaka, Ferguson, S.Eliki-Soloma; Goals: K.Perenara (5/12)

Hiroo Community Green Park, Hiroo, Hokkaido
Referee: Geoff Yorston (Japan)

Team details
Japan		Position	Niue
Name	Number	Position	Number	Name
Travis Drury	1	FB	1	Kore-Lee Perenara
Keita Iwanabe	2	WG	2	Chadson Siakimotu
Geo Maas Louw	3	CE	3	Thomas Kaufononga
Alistair Carless	4	CE	4	Jahzayis Perenara-Livapulu
Sou Miyake	5	WG	5	Santiago Perenara
Ryota Okui	6	FE	6	Thomas Anaki Siumaka
Kohei Yoshitomi	7	HB	7	Alex Seini
Ramu Asahi	8	PR	8	Simon Pati
Mark Huata	9	HK	9	Jayden Fereti
Taro Miyao	10	PF	10	Brett Ferguson
Kazuki Otake	11	SR	11	Mcfitu Tukuniu
Jinnosuke Takeuchi	12	SR	12	De'Yontae Soloma
Seiya Kakuta	13	LK	13	Raven Togiafofoa
Mikey Peters	14	IN	14	M'Jaye Carter Perenara
Liam Mortimer	15	IN	15	Shaquille Eliki-Soloma
Lachlan Grieve	16	IN	16	Te'mauiuia Poe
Shoji Yoshita	17	IN	17	Cassius Eliki-Soloma

=== 2026 Women's World Cup, interconfederation qualifying ===
==== Semi-finals ====
21 October 2025
15:30 EDT (UTC-04:00)

Ireland	0–10	Nigeria
	Report	Tries: Omoghan, Iliya; Goals: Akhabue (0/1), Akeje (1/1)

Terry Fox Stadium, Brampton, Canada
Referee: Kemoy Whyte (Jamaica)

Team details
Ireland		Position	Nigeria
Name	Number	Position	Number	Name
Lily Rogan	1	FB	1	Blessing Umude
Cliodhna O'Sullivan	2	WG	2	Success Iyoha
Stephanie Carroll	3	CE	3	Blessing Aladegelu
Mollie Young	4	CE	4	Abiola Obazuaye
Aimee Clarke	5	WG	5	Endurance Ukwuoma
Emma Kelly	6	SO	6	Shondell Akhabue
Jade Walker	7	SH	7	Innocent Adaeze
Sarah Scambary	8	PR	8	Adeola King
Niamh Griffin	9	HK	9	Becky Okitikpe
Aifric Ni Ghibne	10	PF	10	Fedelia Omoghan
Tricia Doyle	11	SR	11	Rachel Iliya
Storm Cobain	12	SR	12	Vera Akhihiero-Pedro
Iona McCusker	13	LF	13	Faustina Akeje
Polly Roberts	14	IN	14	Chinaza Abbah
Jemma Gallagher	15	IN	15	Lauretta Bayere
Stacy Hanley	16	IN	16	Akinade Rukayat
Martha Dwyer	17	IN	17	Danyelle Shobanjo
Anna Potterton	18	RES
Matt Kennerson		Coach		Bolu Fagborun

21 October 2025
18:00 EDT (UTC-04:00)

Canada	0–48	Fiji
	Report	Tries: Staples, Marshall (2), Waterman (3), Laing, Paseka (3), Manu; Goals: Waterman (1/1), Yaranamu (2/9)

Terry Fox Stadium, Brampton, Canada
Referee: Tara Jones (England)

Team details
Canada		Position	Fiji
Name	Number	Position	Number	Name
Petra Woods	1	FB	1	Cassie Staples
Lauren Mueller	2	WG	2	Tahlia Marshall
Grace Campbell	3	CE	3	Isabella Waterman
Maddy Aberg	4	CE	4	Sienna Laing
Candace Scholten	5	WG	5	Maria Paseka
Alayna Scramstad	6	SO/FE	6	Sereana Naitokatoka
Danielle Franada	7	SH/HB	7	Luisa Yaranamu
Sarah Maguire	8	PR	8	Leilani Asham
Caitlin Sears	9	HK	9	Teaghan Hartigan
Chantelle Crowl	10	PF	10	Latisha Smythe
Gabrielle Hindley	11	SR	11	Tanika Newton
Eleta Mitton	12	SR	12	Elizabeth Naleba
Megan Pakulis	13	LF/LK	13	Kelilani Manu
Alanna Fittes	14	IN	14	Rory Muller
Rachel Choboter	15	IN	15	Joy Levy
Ada Okonkwo	16	IN	16	Ebony Laing
Rebecca Kochuk	17	IN	17	Naomi Tegu
Beth Hoffstetter	18	RES	18	Kinisalote Vusawa
Matt Barron		Coach		Joe Dakuitoga

==== Third-place playoff ====
26 October 2025
13:30 EDT (UTC-04:00)

Ireland	6–36	Canada
Tries: Doyle 12'; Goals: Cobain (1/2)	Report	Tries: Pakulis 9'; Mitton 47'; Scholten 52', 75'; Mueller 60'; Campbell 62'; Goals: Aberg (2/2); Sears (4/4)

Terry Fox Stadium, Brampton, Canada
Referee: Kemoy Whyte (Jamaica)

Team details
Ireland		Position	Canada
Name	Number	Position	Number	Name
Lily Rogan	1	FB	1	Petra Woods
Lena Kibler	2	WG	2	Lauren Mueller
Stephanie Carroll	3	CE	3	Grace Campbell
Anna Potterton	4	CE	4	Maddy Aberg
Mollie Young	5	WG	5	Candace Scholten
Emma Kelly	6	SO	6	Alayna Scramstad
Jade Walker	7	SH	7	Danielle Franada
Sarah Scambary	8	PR	8	Sarah Maguire
Polly Roberts	9	HK	9	Caitlin Sears
Jemma Gallagher	10	PF	10	Chantelle Crowl
Aifric Ni Ghibne	11	SR	11	Gabrielle Hindley
Tricia Doyle	12	SR	12	Beth Hoffstetter
Storm Cobain	13	LF	13	Megan Pakulis
Iona McCusker	14	IN	14	Alanna Fittes
Molly Boyne	15	IN	15	Rachel Choboter
Stacy Hanley	16	IN	16	Ada Okonkwo
Niamh Griffin	17	IN	17	Eleta Mitton
Aimee Clarke (not used)	18	RES	18	Maddie Hobson (not used)
Matt Kennerson		Coach		Matt Baron

==== Final ====
26 October 2025
15:00 EDT (UTC-04:00)

Nigeria	4–62	Fiji
Tries: Iyoha 38'	Report	Tries: Paseka 8'; Asham 12', 43', 78'; Laing 14'; Staples 17',31',48',56'; Marshall 20'; Tegu 72'; Goals: Yaranamu (9/11)

Terry Fox Stadium, Brampton, Canada
Referee: Tara Jones (England)

Team details
Nigeria		Position	Fiji
Name	Number	Position	Number	Name
Blessing Aladeyelu	1	FB	1	Cassie Staples
Success Iyoha	2	WG	2	Tahlia Marshall
Abiola Obazuaye	3	CE	3	Isabella Waterman
Siobhan Sheerin	4	CE	4	Sienna Laing
Endurance Ukwuoma	5	WG	5	Maria Paseka
Shondell Akhabue	6	SO/FE	6	Sereana Naitokatoka
Innocent Adaeze	7	SH/HB	7	Luisa Yaranamu
Adeola King	8	PR	8	Leilani Asham
Becky Okitikpe	9	HK	9	Teaghan Hartigan
Fedelia Omoghan	10	PF	10	Latisha Smythe
Rachel Iliya	11	SR	11	Tanika Newton
Vera Akhihiero-Pedro	12	SR	12	Elizabeth Naleba
Faustina Akeje	13	LF/LK	13	Kelilani Manu
Chinaza Abbah	14	IN	14	Rory Muller
Lauretta Bayere	15	IN	15	Joy Levy
Rukayat Akinade	16	IN	16	Ebony Laing
Danyelle Shobanjo	17	IN	17	Naomi Tegu
Aminah Olaniyan (not used)	18	RES	18	Kinisalote Vusawa (not used)
Bolu Fagborun		Coach		Joe Dakuitoga

=== 2025 England wheelchair tour ===
24 October 2025
19:00 AEDT (UTC+11:00)

New South Wales	10–86	England
Tries: Cannane, Engles; Goals: Karim (1/2)	1st: 10–34; 2nd: 0–52; Report	Tries: Brown (3), King, Boardman, Domingos, Collins, Hawkins (5), Bechara (2), Coyd; Goals: Boardman (5/6), Collins (8/9)

Whitlam Centre, Sydney
Referee: Steve Hewson (Australia)

Team details
New South Wales		Position	England
Name	Number	Position	Number	Name
Cory Cannane	1	Starter	1	Mason Billington
Liam Luff	2	Starter	2	Jack Brown
Brad Grove (c)	3	Starter	3	Wayne Boardman
Diab Karim	4	Starter	4	Lewis King (c)
Toby Popple	5	Starter	5	Luis Domingos
Richard Engles	6	Interchange	6	Finlay O’Neill
Joey Abboud	7	Interchange	7	Joe Coyd
Brad Burns	8	Interchange	8	Nathan Collins
Stephan Rochecouste	9	Interchange	9	Seb Bechara
Chris O'Brien	10	Interchange	10	Rob Hawkins
Neil Stanley		Coach		Tom Coyd

27 October 2025
12:00 AEST (UTC+10:00)

Queensland	60–72	England
Tries: Arbuckle, Anstey (2), Schumaker (5), Tannock (2); Goals: Kruger (1/1), McKenna (9/9)	1st: 24–42; 2nd: 36–30; Report	Tries: Collins (2), Hawkins, Coyd (3), King, Billington (2), Domingos (2), Bechara, O'Neill; Goals: Collins (7/8), Hawkins (1/1), Coyd (1/2), Boardman (1/1), O'Neill (0/1)

Caloundra Sports Centre, Sunshine Coast
Player of the Match: Nathan Collins

Team details
Queensland		Position	England
Name	Number	Position	Number	Name
Pete Arbuckle	1	Starter	1	Nathan Collins
Dan Anstey	2	Starter	2	Rob Hawkins
Jack Kruger	3	Starter	3	Joe Coyd
Dylan Gawthorne	4	Starter	4	Lewis King
Brett Bazley	5	Starter	5	Mason Billington
Bayley McKenna	6	Interchange	6	Wayne Boardman
Zac Schumacher	7	Interchange	7	Luis Domingos
Adam Tannock	8	Interchange	8	Jack Brown
John Clarke	9	Interchange	9	Seb Bechara
		Interchange	10	Finley O'Neill
Jeff Wright		Coach		Tom Coyd

30 October 2025
15:00 AEST (UTC+10:00)

Australia	28–56	England
Tries: Schumacher (2), Anstey (2), Cannane; Goals: Schumacher (4/5)	1st: 12–22; 2nd: 16–34; Report	Tries: Collins (2), Coyd, Hawkins (3), King, Billington, O'Neill, Bechara; Goals: Collins (4/7), Hawkins (4/4)

Gold Coast Sports and Leisure Centre, Gold Coast
Referees: Rebecca Whiteley (England), Steve Hewson (Australia)

Team details
Australia		Position	England
Name	Number	Position	Number	Name
Dan Anstey	1	Starter	1	Nathan Collins
Cory Cannane	2	Starter	2	Rob Hawkins
Zac Schumacher	3	Starter	3	Joe Coyd
Adam Tannock	4	Starter	4	Lewis King
Diab Karim	5	Starter	5	Mason Billington
Peter Arbuckle	6	Interchange	6	Jack Brown
Brad Grove	7	Interchange	7	Seb Bechara
Dylan Gawthorne	8	Interchange	8	Finley O'Neill
Brett Clark		Coach		Tom Coyd

2 November 2025
15:00 AEST (UTC+10:00)

Australia	42–48	England
Tries: McKenna (2), Schumacher, Karim, Anstey (2), Tannock; Goals: McKenna (7/7)	1st: 30–18; 2nd: 12–30; Report	Tries: Hawkins (2), King (3), O'Neill, Brown (2); Goals: Collins (5/5), Hawkins (1/4)

Gold Coast Sports and Leisure Centre, Gold Coast
Referees: Rebecca Whiteley (England), Anthony Bishop (Australia)

Team details
Australia		Position	England
Name	Number	Position	Number	Name
Bayley McKenna	1	Starter	1	Nathan Collins
Zac Schumacher	2	Starter	2	Rob Hawkins
Diab Karim	3	Starter	3	Joe Coyd
Dan Anstey	4	Starter	4	Lewis King
Adam Tannock	5	Starter	5	Finley O'Neill
Cory Cannane	6	Interchange	6	Mason Billington
Brad Grove	7	Interchange	7	Luis Domingos
Peter Arbuckle	8	Interchange	8	Jack Brown
		Interchange
Brett Clark		Coach		Tom Coyd

=== 2026 Men's World Cup, interconfederation qualifying – Northern Hemisphere playoff ===
25 October 2025
15:30 CEST (UTC+02:00)

France	36–0	Jamaica
Tries: 7 Griffier 8', 78'; Yaha 28', 54'; Séguier 15'; Bousquet 46'; Darrélatour 72'; Goals: 4 Mourgue (4/7)	1st: 16–0; 2nd: 20–0; Report

Stadium Municipal d'Albi, Albi
Attendance: 6,200
Referee: Aaron Moore (England)

Team details
France		Position	Jamaica
Name	Number	Position	Number	Name
Arthur Mourgue	1	FB	1	Ben Jones-Bishop
Léo Darrélatour	2	WG	2	Jack Rampton
Arthur Romano	3	CE	3	Jimmy Morgan
Enzo Griffier	4	CE	4	Christopher Ball
Fouad Yaha	5	WG	5	Jamin Williams
César Rougé	6	SO	6	James Woodburn-Hall
Théo Fages	7	SH	7	Kieran Rush
Jordan Dezaria	8	PR	8	Delaine Gittens-Bedward
Alrix Da Costa	9	HK	9	Ashton Golding (c)
Romain Navarette	10	PF	10	Dec Tomlinson
Louis Grossemy	11	SR	11	AJ Wallace
Paul Séguier	12	SR	12	Keenen Tomlinson
Benjamin Garcia (c)	13	LF	13	Keenan Ramsden
Anthony Marion	14	IN	15	Jordan Andrade
Julian Bousquet	15	IN	16	Leo Evans
Justin Sangaré	16	IN	17	Isaac Coleman
Guillermo Aispuro-Bichet	17	IN	19	Harlen Smith
Ugo Tison (not used)	18	RES	18	Joshua Hudson-Lett (not used)
Laurent Frayssinous		Coach		Jy-mel Coleman

=== 2025 Kangaroo tour ===
25 October 2025
14:30 BST (UTC+01:00)

England	6–26	Australia
Tries: 1 Clark 76'; Goals: 1 Lewis 77' (1/1)	1st: 0–8; 2nd: 6–18; Report	Tries: 4 Walsh 22', 72'; Crichton 45', 65'; Goals: 5 Cleary 23', pen 40', 47', 66', 73' (5/5)

Wembley Stadium, London
Attendance: 60,812
Referee: Liam Moore (England)
Video referee: Jack Smith (England)
Touch judges: Mark Craven (England) and Richard Thompson (England)
Player of the Match: Reece Walsh (Australia)

Team details
England		Position	Australia
Name	Number	Position	Number	Name
Jack Welsby	1	FB	1	Reece Walsh
Dominic Young	2	WG	2	Mark Nawaqanitawase
Herbie Farnworth	3	CE	3	Kotoni Staggs
Jake Wardle	4	CE	4	Gehamat Shibasaki
Tom Johnstone	5	WG	5	Josh Addo-Carr
George Williams (c)	6	SO/FE	6	Cameron Munster
Mikey Lewis	7	SH/HB	7	Nathan Cleary
Ethan Havard	8	PR	8	Patrick Carrigan
Daryl Clark	9	HK	9	Harry Grant (vc)
Matty Lees	10	PF	10	Tino Fa'asuamaleaui
John Bateman	11	SR	11	Angus Crichton
Kai Pearce-Paul	12	SR	12	Hudson Young
Morgan Knowles	13	LF/LK	13	Isaah Yeo (c)
Jez Litten	14	IN	14	Tom Dearden
Alex Walmsley	15	IN	15	Lindsay Collins
Owen Trout	16	IN	16	Reuben Cotter
Mike McMeeken	17	IN	17	Keaon Koloamatangi
AJ Brimson (not used)	18	RES	18	Bradman Best (not used)
Shaun Wane		Coach		Kevin Walters
NRL.com

1 November 2025
14:30 GMT (UTC±00:00)

England	4–14	Australia
Goals: 2 Smith pen 9', pen 40' (2/2); Sin bin: Young (yellow card) 2' to 12'	1st: 4–4; 2nd: 0–10; Report	Tries: 2 Munster 49'; Young 53'; Goals: 3 Cleary pen 3', pen 25', 54' (3/4); Sin bin: Fa'asuamaleaui (yellow card) 2' to 12'; Walsh (yellow card) 66' to 76'

Hill Dickinson Stadium, Liverpool
Attendance: 52,106
Referee: Grant Atkins (Australia)
Video referee: Jack Smith (England)
Player of the Match: Cameron Munster (Australia)

Team details
England		Position	Australia
Name	Number	Position	Number	Name
AJ Brimson	1	FB	1	Reece Walsh
Dominic Young	2	WG	2	Mark Nawaqanitawase
Herbie Farnworth	3	CE	3	Kotoni Staggs
Jake Wardle	4	CE	4	Gehamat Shibasaki
Tom Johnstone	5	WG	5	Josh Addo-Carr
George Williams (c)	6	SO/FE	6	Cameron Munster
Harry Smith	7	SH/HB	7	Nathan Cleary
Mike McMeeken	8	PR	8	Lindsay Collins
Jez Litten	9	HK	9	Harry Grant (c)
Matty Lees	10	PF	10	Tino Fa'asuamaleaui
Kai Pearce-Paul	11	SR	11	Angus Crichton
Kallum Watkins	12	SR	12	Hudson Young
Morgan Knowles	13	LF/LK	13	Patrick Carrigan
Mikey Lewis	14	IN	14	Tom Dearden
Alex Walmsley	15	IN	15	Lindsay Smith
Morgan Smithies	16	IN	16	Reuben Cotter
Mikolaj Oledzki	17	IN	17	Keaon Koloamatangi
Owen Trout (not used)	18	RES	18	Bradman Best (not used)
Shaun Wane		Coach		Kevin Walters
NRL.com

8 November 2025
14:30 GMT (UTC±00:00)

England	8–30	Australia
Tries: 1 Williams 33'; Goals: 2 Smith 34', pen 40' (2/2)	1st: 8–12; 2nd: 0–18; Report	Tries: 5 Addo-Carr 5'; Young 26'; Grant 62'; Walsh 68', 78'; Goals: 5 Cleary 7', 27', 63', 69', 79' (5/5)

Headingley Rugby Stadium, Leeds
Attendance: 19,500
Referee: Grant Atkins (Australia)
Video referee: Tom Grant (England)
Player of the Match: Harry Grant (Australia)

Team details
England		Position	Australia
Name	Number	Position	Number	Name
AJ Brimson	1	FB	1	Reece Walsh
Joe Burgess	2	WG	2	Mark Nawaqanitawase
Harry Newman	3	CE	3	Kotoni Staggs
Herbie Farnworth	4	CE	4	Gehamat Shibasaki
Tom Johnstone	5	WG	5	Josh Addo-Carr
George Williams (c)	6	SO/FE	6	Cameron Munster
Harry Smith	7	SH/HB	7	Nathan Cleary
Mike McMeeken	8	PR	8	Patrick Carrigan
Jez Litten	9	HK	9	Harry Grant
Matty Lees	10	PF	10	Tino Fa'asuamaleaui
Kai Pearce-Paul	11	SR	11	Angus Crichton
Kallum Watkins	12	SR	12	Hudson Young
Morgan Knowles	13	LF/LK	13	Isaah Yeo (c)
Mikey Lewis	14	IN	14	Tom Dearden
Alex Walmsley	15	IN	15	Lindsay Collins
Morgan Smithies	16	IN	16	Reuben Cotter
Mikolaj Oledzki	17	IN	17	Keaon Koloamatangi
Owen Trout (not used)	18	RES	18	Bradman Best (not used)
Shaun Wane		Coach		Kevin Walters
NRL.com

=== Wales men v Ireland ===
25 October 2025
15:00 BST (UTC+01:00)

Wales	24–0	Ireland
Tries: Clarke, McEwan-Peters, Lloyd, Davies; Goals: Fozard (3/3), Lloyd (1/1)	1st: 6–0; 2nd: 18–0; Report

The Gnoll, Neath Port Talbot
Referee: Liam Rush (England)

Team details
Wales		Position	Ireland
Name	Number	Position	Number	Name
Samuel Dickenson	1	FB	1	Oliver Whitford
Billy Walkley	2	WG	2	Lewis King
Max Clarke	3	CE	3	Dan Corcoran
Lloyd McEwan-Peters	4	CE	4	Connor Carr
Owen Restall	5	WG	5	James Farrar
Denive Balmforth	6	SO	6	Aidan McGowan
Matty Fozard	7	SH	7	Brendan O'Hagan
Matt Ross	8	PR	8	George King
Finley Yates	9	HK	9	Declan O'Donnell
Huw Worthington	10	PF	10	Lucas Castle
Rhodri Lloyd	11	SR	11	Harry Rushton
Sam Grice	12	SR	12	Lachlan Lanksey
Connor Davies	13	LF	13	Aaron Lynch
Charlie Newton	14	IN	14	Ryan Hogg
Charlie Glover	15	IN	15	Ronan Michael
Ashton Robinson	16	IN	16	Jamie Gill
Sam Bowring	17	IN	17	Daniel Lynch
George Birch (not used)	18	RES	18	Will Walker (not used)
Paul Berry		Coach		Ged Corcoran

1 November 2025
15:00 GMT (UTC±00:00)

Wales	12–36	Ireland
Tries: Restall, Balmforth; Goals: Fozard (2/2)	1st: 6–26; 2nd: 6–10; Report	Tries: Corcoran, Carr (2), O'Hagan (2), Whitford, Lynch, Wing; Goals: McGowan (2/7), Whitford (0/2), Rushton (0/1)

Post Office Road, Featherstone
Referee: James Vella (England)

Team details
Wales		Position	Ireland
Name	Number	Position	Number	Name
Samuel Dickenson	1	FB	1	Aidan McGowan
Owen Restall	2	WG	2	Lewis Wing
Max Clarke	3	CE	3	Dan Corcoran
Lloyd McEwan-Peters	4	CE	4	Aaron Lynch
Billy Walkley	5	WG	5	Connor Carr
Denive Balmforth	6	SO	6	Harry Rushton
Matty Fozard	7	SH	7	Brendan O'Hagan
Samuel Bowring	8	PR	8	George King
Finley Yates	9	HK	9	Declan O'Donnell
Huw Worthington	10	PF	10	Ronan Michael
Matt Ross	11	SR	11	Zack McComb
Sam Grice	12	SR	12	Lachlan Lanskey
Connor Davies	13	LF	13	Pat Moran
Charlie Newton	14	IN	14	Oliver Whitford
Charlie Glover	15	IN	15	Joe Philbin
Ashton Robinson	16	IN	16	Lucas Castle
George Birch	17	IN	17	Ryan Hogg
		RES
Paul Berry		Coach		Ged Corcoran

=== Poland men v Czechia ===
26 October 2025
14:00 CET (UTC+01:00)

Poland	46–8	Czech Republic
Tries: Kowalewski (3), Myszkowski, Zerbe, Scibor, Tutak, Kostecki; Goals: Mateusz Kowalewski (7/8)	1st: 30–4; 2nd: 16–4; Report	Tries: Hron, Adame

Majowski Wembley, Kalisz
Referee: Misa Vakadranu (Fiji)

Team details
Poland		Position	Czech Republic
Name	Number	Position	Number	Name
Mateusz Kowalewski	1	FB	1	Dominik Doleček
Mateusz Daszkowski	2	WG	2	Jakub Vinklar
Piotr Bielec	3	CE	3	Matej Ungrad
Kamil Kleszcz	4	CE	4	Antonin Hron
Konrad Szymanczak	5	WG	5	Filip Holenda
Alex Łyczakowski	6	SO	6	Marek Tejchman
Stef Archer	7	SH	7	Tomáš Adamec
Maciej Myszkowski	8	PR	8	Vojtěch Svoboda
Tomasz Zerbe	9	HK	9	Jiri Brynda
Stanislaw Scibor	10	PF	10	Jan Chuchlík
Mateusz Luckzak	11	SR	11	Tobias Marek
Wiktor Parol	12	SR	12	Vit Poner
Jonathan Tutak	13	LF	13	Vit Studecky
Mateusz Kłosiński	14	IN	14	Marek Henzl
Robert Sobiesiak	15	IN	15	Josef Slanina
Łukasz Kostecki	16	IN	16	Jakub Doležálek
Jakub Zalewski	17	IN	17	Kryštof Tajovský
Piotr Mieszczański	18	RES	18	Ondrej Bartos
Łukasz Łucka		Coach		Tomas Adamec

=== New Zealand at the NRL Wheelchair Championship ===
31 October to 2 November

- New Zealand finished 4th:
  - Won 24–14 against Queensland Reserves
  - Lost 10–24 against Queensland
  - Lost 0–18 against New South Wales
  - Lost 18–22 against Australian Capital Territory
  - Won 50–6 against (Victoria (state)) Victoria
  - Won 36–6 against (South Australia) (Western Australia) (Northern Territory) Affiliated States

== November ==
=== Cumbria men v Nigeria ===
2 November 2025
14:00 GMT (UTC±00:00)

Cumbria	70–6†	Nigeria
Tries: Broadbent (2), Archer (2), Holgate, Toal, Teare (2), Cresswell (3), Carter, Holliday; Goals: Carter 9/13	Report	Tries: Mustapha; Goals: Corkill (1/1)

Craven Park, Barrow-in-Furness
Attendance: 1,475
Referee: Adam Williams

Team details
Cumbria		Position	Nigeria
Name	Number	Position	Number	Name
Luke Cresswell	1	FB	1	Caleb Adetona
Luke Broadbent	2	WG	2	Jibola Oki
Jordan Burns	3	CE	3	Femi Akintoye
Curtis Teare	4	CE	4	Peace Aghogho Ejiro
Shane Toal	5	WG	5	Abdullah Balogun
Jake Carter	6	SO	6	Rio Corkill
Ellis Archer	7	SH	7	Alex Onyeahasi
Harvie Hill	8	PR	8	Dan Okoro
Ellison Holgate	9	HK	9	Jubril Olajide
Brad Singleton	10	PF	10	Leo Aliyu
Connor Holliday	11	SR	11	Michael Ogunwole
Ellis Gillam	12	SR	12	Ayanfe Kinfeoshioke
Finn McMillan	13	LF	13	Muizz Mustapha
Max Anderson-Moore	14	IN	14	Uzoma Anyiam-Osigwe
Tom Walker	15	IN	15	David Ugwo
Stevie Scholey	16	IN	16	Chris Mark-Hansen
Jordan Thomson	17	IN	17	Joshua Olugbodi
Jake Pearce	18	Interchange	18	Dele Agorioge
Paul Creary		Coach		Alan Kilshaw

=== Niue men v South Africa in Australia ===
4 November
18:30 AEST (UTC+10:00)

Niue	34–28†	South Africa
Tries: Simi (2), Siumaka, Smalley, Tagavaimotu, Tongotongo; Goals: Seini (3/3), Perenara (2/3)	1st: 6–18; 2nd: 28–10; Report	Tries: Engelbrecht, Ford, Gulliver-Brown, McMillan, Sparrow; Goals: Makhari (2/2), Classen (1/1), Griebenow (1/1), Beukes (0/1)

St Mary's Stadium, Sydney
Referee: Clayton Wills (Australia)

Team details
Niue	Number	Position	Number	South Africa
Kore-Lee Perenara	1	FB	1	Bevan De Vries (c)
Tye Siakisoni	2	WG	2	Hughwan Engelbrecht
Mark Nosa	3	CE	3	Niel Beukes
Alfred Smalley	4	CE	4	Brady Mcmillan
Tonga Tongotongo	5	WG	5	Skye Adams
Alex Seini (c)	6	SO	6	Matthew Lucas
Thomas Siumaka	7	SH	7	Jason Makhari
Simon Pati	8	PR	8	Frikkie Jansen
Jayden Fereti	9	HK	9	Ammaar Furmie
TJ Simi	10	PR	10	Kalum Gulliver-Brown
Smith Tagavaimotu	11	SR	11	Marcelle Corneelsen
Ethan Mokoia	12	SR	12	Marcelle Viljoen
Tristan Alvarado	13	LF	13	Andrew De Jager
Vaughn Pahiva	14	IN	14	Luc Lyndon
Jia Siakisoni	15	IN	15	Ethan Sweet
Noah Hetutu-Davis	16	IN	16	Marius Griebenow
Phenix Kasimausi	17	IN	17	Petrus Venter
Savu Folau	18	IN	18	Keegan Turner
Wesley Lolo	19	IN	19	Matthew Mpofu
Sione Tovo	20	IN	20	Jason Smith
	21	IN	21	Brynn Du Rand
	22	IN	22	Marcel Ford
	23	IN	23	Jakob Biet
	24	IN	24	Herchelle Classen
	25	IN	25	Brad Sparrow
	26	IN	26	Jaco Bezuidenhout
	27	IN	27	Cuba Cleaven-Vanderlaak
Tooks Jackson		Head Coach		Daryl Fisher

=== 2026 Men's World Cup, interconfederation qualifying – Southern Hemisphere playoff ===
9 November 2025
11:25 AEDT (UTC+11:00)

Cook Islands	58–6	South Africa
Tries: 11; Niukore 39', 66'; Cowley 57', 77'; Ulberg 9'; Moale 23'; Marsters 36'; Iro 51'; Piakura 56'; Teague 74'; Ngatikaura 80'; Goals: 7 Marsters 24', 40', 55' (3/6); Ioka 63', 76', 78' (3/4); Iro 80' (1/1)	1st: 20–6; 2nd: 38–0; Report	Tries: 1 De Vlieg 18'; Goals: 1 Beukes 19' (1/1); Sin bin: Perry (yellow card) 30' to 40'

Western Sydney Stadium, Sydney
Attendance: 3,245
Referee: Wyatt Raymond (Australia)

Team details
Cook Islands		Position	South Africa
Name	Number	Position	Number	Name
Esom Ioka	1	FB	1	Luke De Vlieg
Paul Ulberg	2	WG	2	Niel Beukes
KL Iro (c)	3	CE	3	Callum McMenemy
Reubenn Rennie	4	CE	4	Brynn Du Rand
Teapo Stoltman	5	WG	5	Brady McMillan
Cassius Cowley	6	SO	6	Coby Thomas
Esan Marsters	7	SH	7	Kamren Cryer (c)
Makahesi Makatoa	8	PR	8	Shane Mackenzie
Mason Teague	9	HK	9	Kobe Martin
Davvy Moale	10	PF	10	Jason Smith
Brendan Piakura	11	SR	11	Ethan Sweet
Marata Niukore (c)	12	SR	12	Keegan Turner
Pride Petterson-Robati	13	LF	13	Aden Perry
Rua Ngatikaura	14	IN	14	Reilly Canning
Reuben Porter	15	IN	15	Joshua Hill
Justin Makirere	16	IN	16	Ashley Bull
Rhys Dakin	17	IN	17	Marcelle Corneelsen
Amare Milford (not used)	20	RES	18	Kalum Gulliver-Brown (not used)
Karmichael Hunt		Coach		Darryl Fisher

=== Wales wheelchair v UK Armed Forces ===
22 November 2025
14:00 GMT (UTC+00:00)

UK Armed Forces	22–24†	Wales
Tries: Simpson-Hill, Lane, Norfolk (2), Burton-Carter; Goals: Burton-Carter (1)	1st: 16–6; 2nd: 6–18; Report	Tries: Turner (2), Boyd-Ward, S. Williams; Goals: Turner (4)

Allam Sports Centre, Kingston upon Hull

Team details
UK Armed Forces		Position	Wales
Name	Number	Position	Number	Name
James Simpson-Hill	1	Starter	1	Jakub Wasieczko
Liam Stancliffe	2	Starter	2	Scotty Turner
Martin Lane	3	Starter	3	Jodie Boyd-Ward (c)
Tristan Norfolk	4	Starter	4	Stuart Williams
Steven Sampher (c)	5	Starter	5	Mark Williams
Toby Burton-Carter	6	Interchange	6	Lee Sargent
Paul Horrobin	7	Interchange	7	Jess Booth
Ash Lockwood	8	Interchange	8	Brogan Evans
Tom Oates	9	Interchange	9	Matthew Turner
Justin Wells	10	Interchange	10	Jonathan Gill
0		Coach		Alan Caron

=== Jamaica men v Canada ===
22 November 2025
15:30 JAM (UTC-05:00)

Jamaica	34–12	Canada
Tries: Morris (4'), Lynch (10', 69', 76'), Fairclough (32'), Richards (42'), Daley (46'); Goals: Bailey (2/6), A. Jones Bishop (1/1)	1st: 14–4; 2nd: 20–8; Report	Tries: Chuck (20', 64'), Lenahan (74'); Goals: Bourne (0/3)

University of West Indies
Referee: Kemoy Whyte (Jamaica)

Team details
Jamaica		Position	Canada
Name	Number	Position	Number	Name
Ben Jones Bishop	1	FB	1	Jacob Bourne
Kenneth Walker	2	WG	2	Jalen Harrison
Ricardo Richards	3	CE	3	Jason Chuck
Tahj-Jay Lynch	4	CE	4	Colin Crozier
Kamarine Williams	5	WG	5	Daren Archer
Chevaughn Bailey	6	SO	6	Rhys Jacks
Michael Pearson	7	SH	7	Greg Wiser
Daniel Graham	8	PR	8	Dan Martyn
Marvin Thompson	9	HK	9	Toby Horn
Kevin Thomas	10	PF	10	Chuck Curran
Jenson Morris	11	SR	11	Qais Nasseri
Andrew Simpson	12	SR	12	Augustus Murphy
Owen Linton	13	LF	13	Scyler Dumas
Aaron Jones Bishop	14	IN	14	Robin Legault
Kyronn Fairclough	15	IN	15	Doug Howard
Joseph Daley	16	IN	16	Blake Marshall
Akeem Murray	17	IN	17	Oliver Lenahan
		RES
Roy Calvert		Coach		Aaron Zimmerle

=== Ghana v Nigeria double header ===
Women's

23 November 2025
13:00 GMT (UTC±00:00)

Ghana	8–42	Nigeria
Tries: Tuffour (53'); Goals: Kumah (2/2)	1st: 0–10; 2nd: 8–32; Report	Tries: Akinade (5'), Aladeyely (10', 47'), Iyoha (41', 71', 73'), Obazuaye (50', 57'), Larry (64'), Goals: Adaeze (3/9)

University of Ghana Rugby Stadium, Accra

Team details
Ghana		Position	Nigeria
Name	Number	Position	Number	Name
Celestine Kumah	1	FB	1	Endurance Ukwuoma
Princess Avorkah	2	WG	2	Success Iyoha
Mary Adarkwa	3	CE	3	Abiola Obazuaye
Millicent Njomaba	4	CE	4	Blessing Aladeyely
Eunice Lawoe	5	WG	5	Lauretta Bayere
Jacqueline Anash	6	SO	6	Rukayat Akinade
Elizabeth Adongo	7	SH	7	Innocent Adaeze
Fauzia Nurudeen Larry	8	PR	8	Chinaza Abbah
Fati Bhom	9	HK	9	Becky Okitipe
Mariama Musah	10	PF	10	Danyelle Shobanjo
Minawara Ahassan	11	SR	11	Vera Akhihiero-Pedro
Mardiyatu Ouchouwayratu Yara Ibrahim	12	SR	12	Confidence Ibezilim
Hilaria Wuaku	13	LF	13	Faustina Akeje
Gracelove Hammond	14	IN	14	Rukayat Jimoh
Estelle Haizel	15	IN	15	Damilola Nojimu
Margaret Tuffour	16	IN	16	Ashagbesori Kafayat
Jennifer Moncar	17	IN	17	Fathia Abudu
Riddick Alibah		Coach		Bolu Fagborun

Men's

23 November 2025
15:30 GMT (UTC±00:00)

Ghana	36–24	Nigeria
Tries: Osei (6'), Browne (15'), Aikins (29'), Yussif (32'), Ayertey (40', 60'), Boye (42'); Goals: Montchon (4/7)	1st: 24–6; 2nd: 12–18; Report	Tries: Julius (23'), Aikins (29'), William (50'), Yusuf (80'); Drop goals: G. John (4/4)

University of Ghana Rugby Stadium, Accra

Team details
Ghana		Position	Nigeria
Name	Number	Position	Number	Name
Abdul Jalilu Yussif	1	FB	1	Daniel John
Godfred Aikins	2	WG	2	Christian William
Gideon Klugey	3	CE	3	Kiki Stephen
Collins Ofosu	4	CE	4	Joshua Etim
Richard Asare Browne	5	WG	5	Samuel Akpabio
Dieudonne Kofi Montchon	6	SO	6	Jerry Peter
Lewis Boye	7	SH	7	Gabriel Etim John
Bawah Bright	8	PR	8	Emmanuel Agu
David Nartey	9	HK	9	Isa Omale
Emmanuel Acheampong	10	PF	10	Leslie Ume
Jonathon Adotey	11	SR	11	Jude Abrackson
Levi Osei	12	SR	12	Akeem Yusuf
Riddick Abrokwah	13	LF	13	Godwin Julius
Elvis Ayertey	14	IN	14	Andrew John
John Bless Mensah	15	IN	15	David Godwin
Jordan Annan	16	IN	16	Felix Salami
Chris Da Gama	17	IN	17	Akinkunmi Akande
Andy Gilvary		Coach		Samson Okewo

=== Roots Rugby v Ghana ===
26 November 2025

Ghana	8–30†	Roots Women
	Report

University of Ghana Rugby Stadium, Accra

30 November 2025

Ghana	0–30†	Roots Women
	Report

University of Ghana Rugby Stadium, Accra

30 November 2025

Ghana	28–16†	Roots Men
	Report

University of Ghana Rugby Stadium, Accra

Roots Rugby are a cohort of USARL players of African and/or Caribbean heritage. The games on 26 November were originally scheduled to be against Nigeria for both men's and women's team. The women's fixture was replaced by an extra game against Ghana, while the men's game was replaced by a game against a "Ghana President's XIII" team.

=== Asian Championship ===
==== Semi-finals ====
27 November 2025

Japan	4–48†	Singapore
	Report

Philippines

27 November 2025

Philippines	44–10†	Hong Kong
	Report

Philippines

==== Third place play-off ====
29 November 2025

Japan	36–34†	Hong Kong
	Report

Philippines

==== Final ====
29 November 2025

Singapore	62–0†	Philippines
	Report

Philippines

== December ==
=== USA v Jamaica double header ===
The double-header matches between the USA and Jamaica were cancelled due to the disruption in Jamaica caused by Hurricane Melissa.

Women

6 December 2025
15:30 EST (UTC-05:00)

United States	Cancelled	Jamaica

Leto High School Stadium, Tampa, Florida

Men

6 December 2025
18:30 EST (UTC-05:00)

United States	Cancelled	Jamaica

Leto High School Stadium, Tampa, Florida

=== Netherlands women v Greece ===
13 December 2025
12:00

Netherlands	34–0	Greece
Tries: Blom (25',52'), Hiermons (32'), Kennedy (44',59',62'), S. Kalf (57'); Goals: F. Kalf (0/1), Geerlings (3/5), van het Schip (0/1)	1st: 8–0; 2nd: 26–0; Report

RC Sparta, Rotterdam
Referee: Moray Gilland (Scotland)

Team details
Netherlands		Position	Greece
Name	Number	Position	Number	Name
Hiske Blom	1	FB	1	Sofia Anagnostopoulou
Hannah van Beukering	2	WG	2	Sotiria Skouroliakou
Michelle Jurgens	3	CE	3	Anna Limperi
Nicole Kennedy	4	CE	4	Sidar Timurturkan
Monischa Hiermons	5	WG	5	Magdelini Stavrianou
Vera Van Der Zwan	6	SO	6	Georgia Kalomenopoulou
Rixt Aerts	7	SH	7	Ourania Koutsikou
Eva Peroti	8	PR	8	Kalliopi Angelakopoulos
Merel van den Bosch	9	HK	9	Asimina Mastoraki
Fiona Kalf	10	PF	10	Triantafyllia Vasilogianni
Lisa Berding	11	SR	11	Dimitra Papoutsi
Sydney Kalf	12	SR	12	Katerina Niavradakis
Kaylee Geerlings	13	LF	13	Maria-Eleni Gkirlemi
Lisanne van het Schip	14	IN	14	Efrosini Tsiritaki
Iris Hansman	15	IN	15	Paraskevi-Anna Daldaki
Ymke Keppel	16	IN	16	Georgia Pournara
Jiske van Velzen	17	IN	17	Vasiliki Roumpi
Elien de Graaf	18	RES	18	Effie Skouroliakou
Matt Rigby		Coach		Nikolas Stephanou
