= Dundee International Sports Centre =

Sports complex in Dundee, Scotland

Dundee International Sports Complex
- DISC
- Logo of D.I.S.C used on the website.
- Interactive map of Dundee International Sports Complex
- Location: Mains Loan, Dundee, DD4 7AA, Scotland
- Coordinates: 56.476135°N 2.958697°W
- Owner: Dundee City Council
- Operator: Leisure & Culture Dundee

Construction
- Opened: November 1997

Dundee International Sports Complex (commonly referred to as Dundee International Sports Centre or DISC) is a sports centre in Dundee, Scotland, which officially opened in November 1997. The facility is owned by Dundee City Council and operated by Leisure & Culture Dundee.

== Facilities ==
DISC features a large indoor sports hall capable of hosting international competitions. The indoor complex also includes modern fitness suites, dance studios, and an immersive virtual cycling studio. Most indoor facilities are fully accessible by wheelchair.

Outdoors, the complex is equipped with floodlit pitches. This includes a full-sized sand-based 3G artificial turf pitch primarily used for football and rugby, as well as a water-based pitch specifically designed for field hockey.

== Events ==
The complex was built to accommodate high-level sporting events. In 1998, DISC staged the European Hockey Championships. It has since hosted other major hockey tournaments, including the 2016 European Ladies Indoor Hockey Championships and the EuroHockey Indoor Club Cup.

In April 2015, the venue hosted a Celtic Cup match between Scotland and Ireland. This marked the first international wheelchair rugby league match to be played in Scotland.

== Community use ==
In addition to hosting international events, DISC serves as a grassroots community hub. The sports centre is used as a physical education base for pupils from the nearby Morgan Academy. It is also a regular training and competition venue for local clubs in sports such as basketball, netball, badminton, and roller derby.
