= Rachel Iliya =

Nigerian rugby league player

Rachel Iliya is a Nigerian amateur rugby league footballer who plays as a loose forward for Eko Trinity and the Nigeria women's national rugby league team.

Iliya was introduced to rugby league by Abiodun Olawale-Cole, the chairman of Nigeria Rugby League, after playing amateur flag football. Prior to this, Iliya worked as a part-time cleaner from a young age on a monthly salary of £7.50 to support her family, mainly her brother who has sickle cell disease, while also playing association football. She now works as a personal trainer and had a six-month training programme with Bradford Bulls.

Iliya made her international debut in 2024 during Nigeria's 2026 World Cup qualification playoff against Kenya, in which she score two second half tries. After playing in the second leg, she helped Nigeria hold out for a 22–22 draw, going through to the next round of goals kicked.

The following year, Iliya was selected for the second and final round of World Cup qualification, an interconfederation tournament held in Canada. In the semi-finals she scored a second half try to secure a 10–0 victory over Ireland, thought missed out on World Cup qualification losing the final to Fiji.
