= Brogan Evans =

Wales international rugby league player

Personal information
- Born: 1995 (age 30–31) Bolton, Greater Manchester

Playing information
Club
Years	Team	Pld	T	G	FG	P
????–2023	Salford Red Devils
2024	Wigan Warriors	2	0	0	0	0
2025–	Salford Red Devils Wheelchair
	Total	2	0	0	0	0
Representative
Years	Team	Pld	T	G	FG	P
2023	Wales	1	0	0	0	0
2025–	Wales Wheelchair	2	0	0	0	0

Brogan Evans is a Welsh rugby league player who currently plays for the Wigan Warriors wheelchair rugby league team in the RFL Wheelchair Championship and the Wales national wheelchair rugby league team.

Evans began playing the running game and received her first call up for Wales in 2023 while at Salford Red Devils. The game resulted in a 0–60 defeat to England. During her time at Salford, Evans topped the carries and tackles chart for the Super League second division. The following winter she transferred to Wigan Warriors for the 2024 season, marking her first time in the top division of the domestic club game. During Wigan's second Challenge Cup game against Barrow, Evans suffered injuries to her anterior cruciate ligament and medial collateral ligament, During the recovery process, Evens returned to Salford Red Devils, for the wheelchair team, and also earned a call up to the Wales wheelchair team for the 2025 Celtic Cup. In doing so, she became the first rugby league player to earn a senior cap across two disciplines of the sport.

Evans began playing rugby at 19 years old at De Montfort University and played for Birkenhead Park Panthers, in Union and Warrington Wolves before her transfer to Salford and later Wigan Warriors.

Evans is on the autism spectrum and has attention deficit hyperactivity disorder and epilepsy.
