= Nigeria women's national rugby league team =

Nigeria
Team information
- Nickname: Green Falcons
- Governing body: Nigeria Rugby League
- Region: Middle East-Africa
- Head coach: Melissa Spero
- IRL ranking: 10 ▲2 (20 August 2026)

Team results
- First international
- Nigeria 40–4 Ghana (Lagos, Nigeria; 3 November 2023)

The Nigeria women's national rugby league team (nicknamed the Green Falcons) represents Nigeria in international rugby league football competitions. They made their debut in 2023 with a 40–4 victory over Ghana.

In 2024 they beat Kenya in the first Women's Rugby League World Cup qualifying series to be played in Africa. Victory in the series made the team the first team to qualify for the World Series - the final qualifying competition for the 2026 Women's Rugby League World Cup. In the first game of the World Series, the Green Falcons won the first fixture played outside Africa beating Ireland 10–0 to earn a place in the World Series final against Fiji.

The team's head coach is Melissa Spero who was appointed in June 2026.

== Results and fixtures ==
Legend:	won	lost	draw
Nigeria score shown first

Nigeria women's national rugby league team, senior international results
Date	Opponent	Score	Tournament	Venue	Report
3 November 2023	Ghana	40–4	Two-match series	Teslim Balogun Stadium, Lagos	
5 November 2023	Ghana	14–6	Two-match series	Teslim Balogun Stadium, Lagos	
28 January 2024	Ghana	30–20	International	University of Ghana Stadium, Accra	
19 September 2024	Kenya	22–14	2026 World Cup qualification – Middle East-Africa tournament	National Youth Centre Organisation, Nairobi	
22 September 2024	Kenya	0–8	2026 World Cup qualification – Middle East-Africa tournament	Impala Club Rugby Ground, Nairobi	
7 October 2025	Ghana	40–0	Two-match series	Alaro City, Lagos	
11 October 2025	Ghana	24–8	Two-match series	Alaro City, Lagos	
21 October 2025	Ireland	10–0	2026 World Cup qualification – Interconfederation tournament	Terry Fox Stadium, Brampton, Canada	
26 October 2025	Fiji	4–62	2026 World Cup qualification – Interconfederation tournament	Terry Fox Stadium, Brampton, Canada	
23 November 2025	Ghana	42–8	International	University of Ghana Stadium, Accra	
1 August 2026	France	8–36	International	Stade Gilbert Brutus, Perpignan	
