= Celtic Cup (wheelchair rugby league) =

Wheelchair Rugby League competition

- Sport: Rugby league
- Inaugural season: 2015
- Number of teams: 3
- Region: Celtic nations of the British Isles (ERL)
- Holders: Ireland (4th title) (2026)
- Most titles: Wales (7 titles)

The Celtic Cup is an international wheelchair rugby league tournament contested annually by Scotland, Ireland and Wales. It was first held as a two-match series between Scotland and Ireland in 2015 which was won by Ireland. Wales joined in 2016 to create a three-team round-robin tournament and won the cup seven times between 2016 and 2023.

== Background ==
The Ireland, Scotland and Wales teams were all established in 2012 and played their first international matches at the Four Nations competition that year before taking part in the World Cup in 2013. The Celtic Cup was established to provide an opportunity for international matches beyond these tournaments, initially between Ireland and Scotland in 2015, and with Wales in 2016.

== Results ==
Celtic Cup standings by year
Team ╲ Year	2015	2016	2017	2018	2019	2020	2021	2022	2023	2024	2025	2026
Ireland	1	2	2	2	3	–	2	2	2	1	1	1
Scotland	2	3	3	3	2	–	3	3	3	2	3	3
Wales	x	1	1	1	1	–	1	1	1	3	2	2

Notes:
- 2015: Wales did not take part – Ireland and Scotland played each other twice
- 2020: The tournament was cancelled in 2020

== Tournaments ==
=== 2015: Ireland vs Scotland ===
The first leg of the inaugural Celtic Cup was played on 18 April 2015 at the Dundee International Sports Centre, Dundee. It was the first international wheelchair rugby league match to be played in Scotland. Ireland took an early 28-point lead and went on to win the match 52–28. The second leg took place on 24 May at the Blackpool Sports Centre, Blackpool, on the same weekend as the rugby league Summer Bash. Logistically this made sense for Ireland whose captain, Damian McCabe, noted that the sport was "not being played in Ireland at the moment" and that most of the squad lived in northern England. This time Ireland took a 68–10 lead at half-time eventually winning the match 80–48 to win the series with an aggregate score of 132–76.

2015 table
Pos	Team	Pld	W	D	L	PF	PA	PD	Pts	IRE	SCO
1	Ireland	2	2	0	0	132	76	+56	4		80–48
2	Scotland	2	0	0	2	76	132	−56	0	28–52	

=== 2016: A tri-nations event ===
Ireland hosted the second Celtic Cup on 30 April 2016, which was again played at the Blackpool Sports Centre. In 2016 it became a three-team competition when Wales were invited to take part. The match between Ireland and Scotland ended as a draw with both sides scoring 58 points. Wales won both of their matches defeating Ireland 76–26 and Scotland 92–22 to win the cup for the first time.

2016 table
Pos	Team	Pld	W	D	L	PF	PA	PD	Pts	WAL	IRE	SCO
1	Wales	2	2	0	0	168	48	+120	4		76–26	92–22
2	Ireland	2	0	1	1	84	134	−50	1			58–58
3	Scotland	2	0	1	1	80	150	−70	1			

=== 2017: Wales retain title ===
Wales retained their title on 29 April 2017 when the tournament was held at The Peak, Stirling. Hosts Scotland lost their opening fixture 16–26 against Ireland and were kept scoreless by Wales who defeated them 72–0 having already beaten Ireland by a score of 51–6 earlier in the day.

2017 table
Pos	Team	Pld	W	D	L	PF	PA	PD	Pts	WAL	IRE	SCO
1	Wales	2	2	0	0	122	6	+116	4		51–6	72–0
2	Ireland	2	1	0	1	32	67	−35	2			26–16
3	Scotland	2	0	0	2	16	97	−81	0			

=== 2018: First internationals played in Wales ===
The 2018 Celtic Cup was held on 28 April at the Deeside Leisure Centre, Queensferry. Wales, who were hosting an international wheelchair rugby league tournament for the first time, began their title defence with a 112–41 win over Scotland. Ireland also defeated Scotland 68–36, but then lost 84–30 to Wales who claimed a third Celtic Cup title.

2018 table
Pos	Team	Pld	W	D	L	PF	PA	PD	Pts	WAL	IRE	SCO
1	Wales	2	2	0	0	196	71	+125	4		84–30	112–41
2	Ireland	2	1	0	1	98	120	−22	2			68–36
3	Scotland	2	0	0	2	77	180	−103	0			

=== 2019: Scotland win a Celtic Cup match for the first time ===
The 2019 Celtic Cup took place on 27 April at Calderdale College, Halifax. In the opening game Scotland came back from 18–38 at half-time to defeat Ireland 52–42. It was the first win for Scotland in any international since 24 September 2015 when they had beaten both Ireland and Wales in the European Championships. Wales then dominated the tournament scoring centuries in each of their games, firstly against Scotland 102–10 and then Ireland 109–8, to take a fourth consecutive title. (Note: Scotland Rugby League's match report for their 2019 match against Ireland gives the start time as 18:00, which would have been the final match of the day, however, this appears to be inaccurate as other match reports describe this as the opening match of the tournament.)

2019 table
Pos	Team	Pld	W	D	L	PF	PA	PD	Pts	WAL	SCO	IRE
1	Wales	2	2	0	0	211	18	+193	4		102–10	109–8
2	Scotland	2	1	0	1	62	144	−82	2			52–42
3	Ireland	2	0	0	2	50	161	−111	0			

=== 2020 and 2021: COVID-19 cancellation and a fifth win for Wales ===
The Celtic Cup was postponed in 2020 due to the COVID-19 pandemic. It resumed in 2021 and was held on 12 June at the Oriam Performance Centre at Heriot-Watt University, Edinburgh, as the originally proposed venue, The Pleasance sports complex at the University of Edinburgh, was being used as a COVID-19 testing centre. The hosts lost 32–52 to Ireland in the opening game. Ireland then faced Wales who defeated them 96–16 and in a repeat of the 2019 tournament Wales scored a century against Scotland to win 102–18 and maintain their unbeaten record in the Celtic Cup.

2021 table
Pos	Team	Pld	W	D	L	PF	PA	PD	Pts	WAL	IRE	SCO
1	Wales	2	2	0	0	198	34	+164	4		96–16	102–18
2	Ireland	2	1	0	1	68	128	−60	2			52–32
3	Scotland	2	0	0	2	50	154	−104	0			

=== 2022: Wales claim a sixth title ===
On 7 May 2022 the Celtic Cup was held at the Plas Madoc Leisure Centre, Wrexham. Hosts and defending champions Wales defeated Ireland 64–22 in the opening fixture. The second game was close with Ireland taking the victory 38–35 over Scotland. In the final match Wales won 116–6 setting a new record for their biggest win and claiming a sixth Celtic Cup.

2022 table
Pos	Team	Pld	W	D	L	PF	PA	PD	Pts	WAL	IRE	SCO
1	Wales	2	2	0	0	180	28	+152	4		64–22	116–6
2	Ireland	2	1	0	1	60	99	−39	2			38–35
3	Scotland	2	0	0	2	41	154	−113	0			

=== 2023: Seven-in-a-row for Wales ===
The 2023 tournament took take place at the Oriam Performance Centre, Edinburgh, on 18 June. Ireland won 58–24 against Scotland in the opening fixture and then drew 30–30 with Wales. This was the 50th international match played by Wales and the first time that they had ever drawn a match. It was also their first Celtic Cup match that they had not won and meant they needed to win by 35 points against Scotland in the final game of the tournament. They achieved this with a 76–30 win to retain the title.

2023 table
Pos	Team	Pld	W	D	L	PF	PA	PD	Pts	WAL	IRE	SCO
1	Wales	2	1	1	0	106	60	+46	3		30–30	76–30
2	Ireland	2	1	1	0	88	54	+34	3			58–24
3	Scotland	2	0	0	2	54	134	−80	0			

=== 2024: Ireland win in Ireland ===
The 2024 tournament took place on 8 June the University of Galway in Ireland, marking the first wheelchair rugby league games in Ireland. The hosts won the opening match 68–34 against Scotland. Wales faced Scotland in the next match in which four tries and six goals by Scott Trigg-Turner took him past 300 points for Wales. The teams were level with ten minutes to go before Scotland secured a 64–52 win with two late tries. In the final match Wales could have retained the title had they won against Ireland by a large enough points difference, but a 68–32 defeat meant that Ireland won the title for the second time.

2024 table
Pos	Team	Pld	W	D	L	PF	PA	PD	Pts	IRE	SCO	WAL
1	Ireland	2	2	0	0	136	66	+70	4		68–34	68–32
2	Scotland	2	1	0	1	98	120	−22	2			64–52
3	Wales	2	0	0	2	84	132	−48	0			

=== 2025: Ireland retain title ===
The 2025 tournament took place on 24 May 2025 at Cardiff Metropolitan University's Archers Arena. Wales defeated Scotland 62–54 in the opening match in which Wales' Brogan Evans became the first player to earn international caps in both the running game and the wheelchair game. (Note: New Zealand's Tawera Nikau also changed disciplines, but was in the Barbarians team rather than New Zealand at the 2008 Wheelchair Rugby League World Cup.) Scotland then lost 92–20 to Ireland who set a new record for their largest win. The title was decided in the last match of the day in which Stuart Williams scored his 70th international try for Wales but Ireland went on to win 66–10 and retain the title.

2025 table
Pos	Team	Pld	W	D	L	PF	PA	PD	Pts	IRE	WAL	SCO
1	Ireland	2	2	0	0	158	30	+128	4		66–10	92–20
2	Wales	2	1	0	1	72	120	−48	2			62–54
3	Scotland	2	0	0	2	74	154	−80	0			

=== 2026: Three-in-a-row for Ireland ===
The 2026 tournament was hosted by Scotland at the Oriam Performance Centre, Edinburgh, on 23 May. Ireland won the opening fixture 70–40 against Scotland and followed this with a 50–38 win over Wales to secure their third consecutive title. Wales then defeated Scotland 50–46 in a match to determine second place as, for the first time in Celtic Cup history, the title had been decided before the final match had been played.

2026 table
Pos	Team	Pld	W	D	L	PF	PA	PD	Pts	IRE	WAL	SCO
1	Ireland	2	2	0	0	120	78	+42	4		50–38	70–40
2	Wales	2	1	0	1	88	96	−8	2			50–46
3	Scotland	2	0	0	2	86	120	−34	0			
