= International rugby league in 2022 =

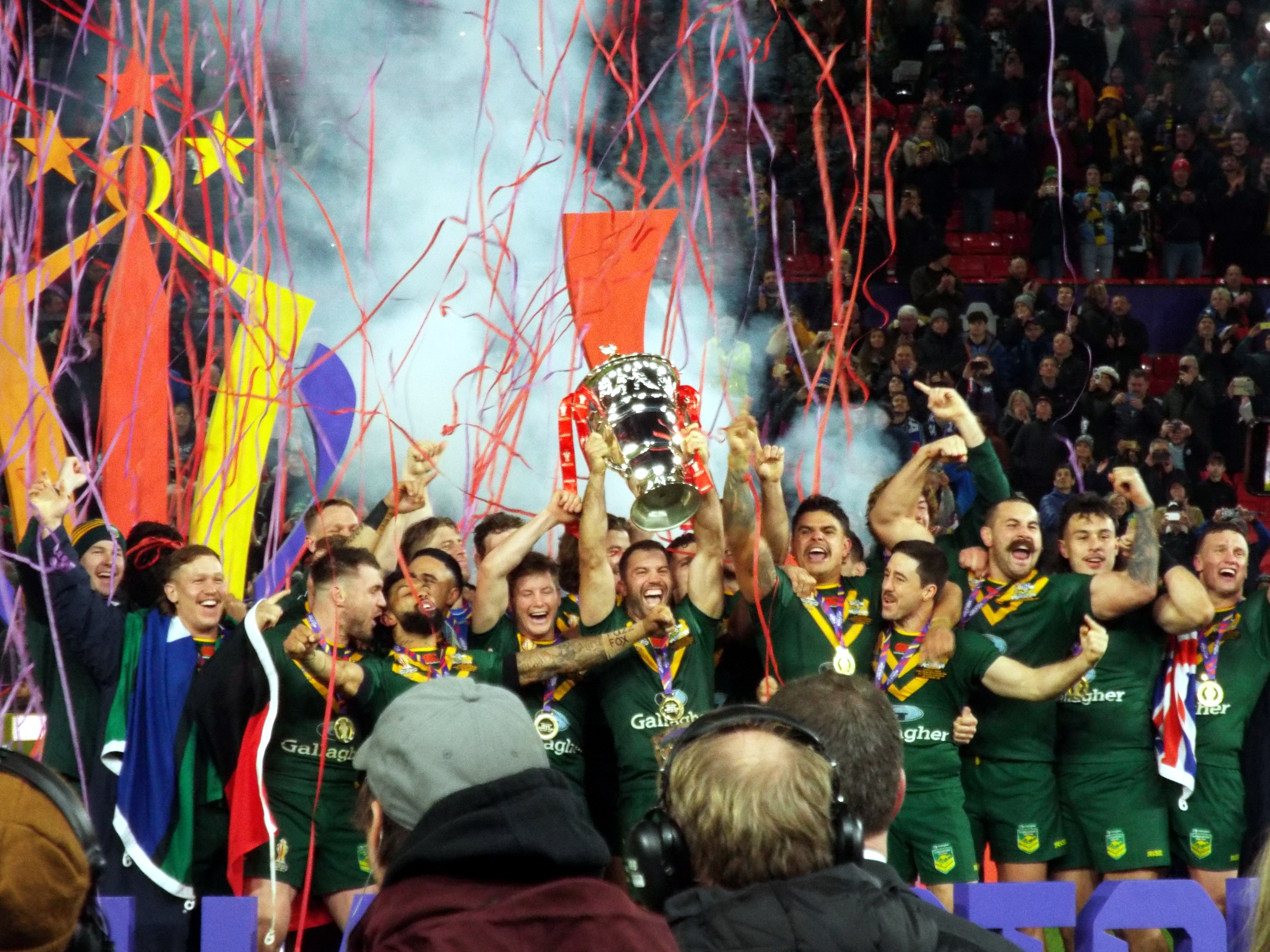
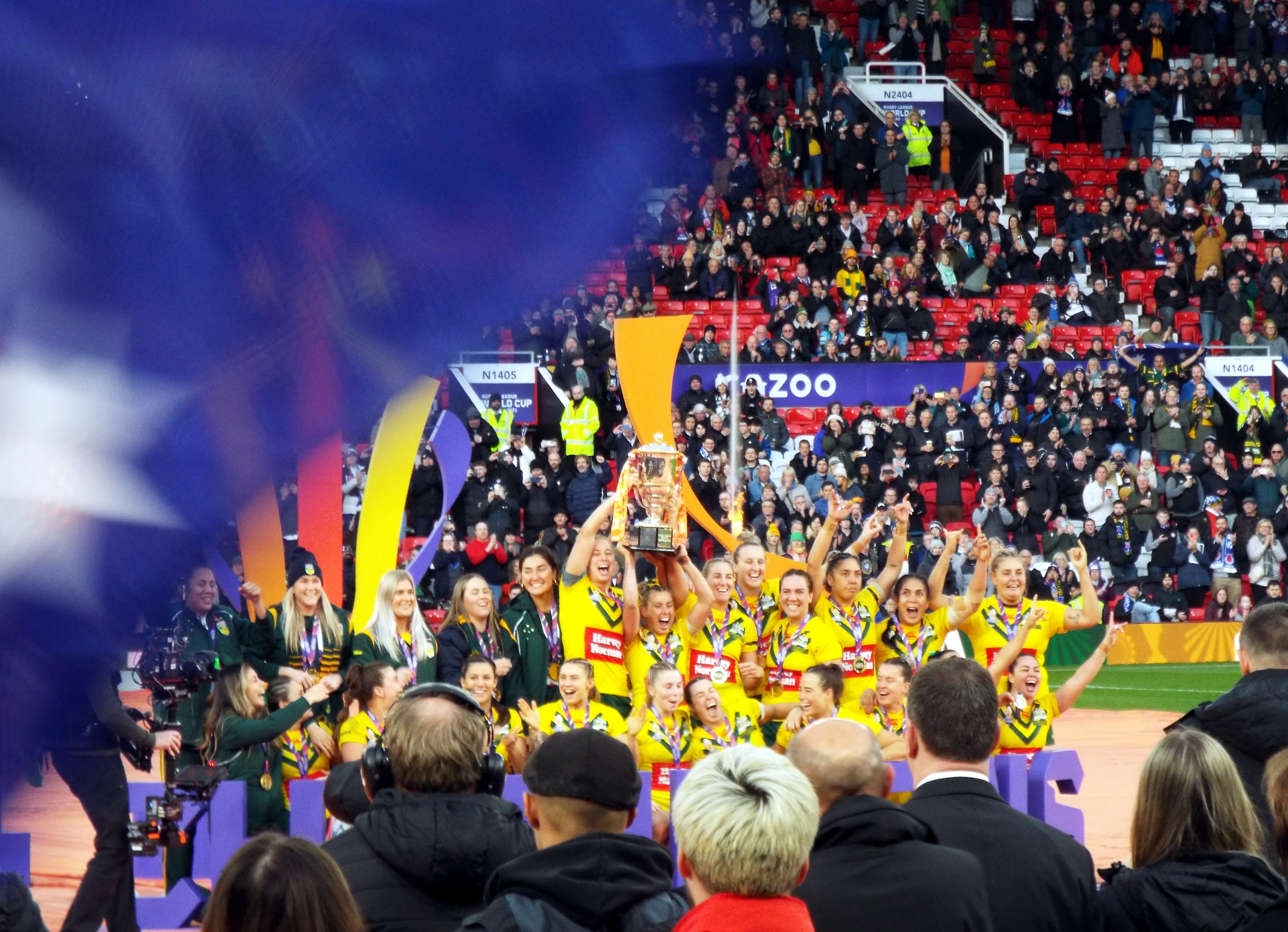
- Australia defended their world championship titles in both the men's and women's game at 2021 Rugby League World Cup held in 2022.

A list of men's, women's, and wheelchair senior international rugby league matches played throughout 2022.

A † denotes a match that did not contribute to the IRL World Rankings - i.e. not a senior international match (SIM) as designated by the International Rugby League (IRL). (Note: IRL defines a SIM as "any match in which a player represents a national federation, where such match has been sanctioned and recognised by IRL and the relevant national federations as a match played between senior national teams, which are national teams of a member national federation playing in a match for world rankings points.")

The 2021 Rugby League World Cup was postponed until 2022 due to Australia and New Zealand pulling out months before the tournament was scheduled to commence.

== Season overview ==
Men's international tours
Start date	Touring side	Region	Results [matches]
No international men's tours in 2022
Men's international friendlies
Date	Home team	Away team	Winners
6 February 2022	North Macedonia	Malta	Malta
5 March 2022	Chile	Philippines	Chile
14 May 2022	Malta	Montenegro	Malta
5 June 2022	Brazil	South Africa	South Africa
19 June 2022	France	Wales	France
22 June 2022	Lebanon	Malta	Lebanon
25 June 2022	New Zealand	Tonga	New Zealand
25 June 2022	Samoa	Cook Islands	Samoa
25 June 2022	Papua New Guinea	Fiji	Papua New Guinea
17 September 2022	Spain	Netherlands	Netherlands
25 September 2022	Turkey	Bulgaria	Turkey
7 October 2022	England	Fiji	England
8 October 2022	Netherlands	Germany	Germany
8 October 2022	France	Tonga	Tonga
8 October 2022	Bulgaria	Malta	Malta
8 October 2022	Wales	Lebanon	Lebanon
9 October 2022	El Salvador	Japan	Japan
9 October 2022	Philippines	Thailand	Philippines
29 October 2022	Slovakia	Poland	Poland
26 November 2022	Poland	South Africa	South Africa
Men's international tournaments
Start date	Tournament		Winners
27 September 2022	(Ghana) MEA Championship		Nigeria
15 October 2022	(England) World Cup		Australia
25 November 2022	(Colombia) South American Championship		Brazil

Women's international tours
Start date	Touring side	Region	Results [matches]
No international women's tours in 2022
Women's international friendlies
Start date	Home team	Away team	Winners
16 April 2022	Canada	United States	Canada
12 June 2022	Wales	England	England
18 June 2022	England	France	England
25 June 2022	New Zealand	Tonga	New Zealand
23 October 2022	Philippines	Malta	Malta
25 October 2022	Ireland	Canada	Ireland
27 October 2022	Brazil	France	France
Women's international tournaments
Start date	Tournament		Winners
11 June 2022	(Europe) European Championship B North		Wales
25 September 2022	(Europe) European Championship B South		Greece
1 November 2022	(England) World Cup		Australia

== Rankings ==
The following were the rankings at the beginning of the season.

IRL Men's World Rankings
Official rankings as of 10 December 2021
Rank	Change	Team	Pts %
1	Steady	New Zealand	100.00
2	▲1	England	79.00
3	▲1	Tonga	69.00
4	▼2	Australia	60.00
5	▲1	Papua New Guinea	34.00
6	▼1	Fiji	30.00
7	▲1	France	21.00
8	▼1	Samoa	19.00
9	▲6	Serbia	18.00
10	▲1	Greece	15.00
11	▼2	Scotland	13.00
12	Steady	Ireland	12.00
13	▼3	Lebanon	10.00
14	▲11	Netherlands	10.00
15	▲1	Malta	9.00
16	▼3	Italy	8.00
17	▲5	Czech Republic	8.00
18	▲2	Jamaica	7.00
19	▲5	Turkey	7.00
20	▼3	Norway	6.04
21	▼2	Poland	6.03
22	▲1	Cook Islands	6.02
23	▼9	Wales	6.00
24	▼6	United States	5.00
25	▲14	Ukraine	4.29
26	New entry	Philippines	4.00
27	▲1	Nigeria	3.81
28	▼2	Spain	3.61
29	▲2	Germany	3.52
30	▼9	Hungary	2.86
31	▲2	Ghana	2.85
32	▼2	Sweden	2.80
33	▲1	Morocco	2.70
34	▲4	Cameroon	1.79
35	▲2	Russia	1.72
36	▼9	Canada	1.66
37	▼8	Solomon Islands	1.61
38	▼2	South Africa	1.31
39	▲7	Bulgaria	1.21
40	▼5	Vanuatu	1.06
41	▲1	Belgium	1.04
42	▼1	Brazil	1.03
43	▼11	Chile	1.02
44	New entry	Bosnia and Herzegovina	1.00
45	▼5	Colombia	0.50
46	▼3	Denmark	0.10
47	▼2	Latvia	0.05
Complete rankings at INTRL.SPORT

IRL Women's World Rankings
Official rankings as of 10 December 2021
Rank	Change	Team	Pts %
1	Steady	Australia	100.00
2	Steady	New Zealand	75.00
3	Steady	England	73.00
4	Steady	Papua New Guinea}	49.00
5	▲1	France	35.00
6	▼1	Canada	30.00
7	▲2	Serbia	22.00
8	Steady	Italy	20.00
9	▲2	Fiji	19.00
10	▲2	Turkey	19.00
11	▲2	Samoa	12.00
12	▼5	Cook Islands	13.00
13	New entry	Wales	12.00
14	New entry	Ireland	8.00
15	▼2	Brazil	5.00
16	▼1	Greece	3.00
17	▼3	Lebanon	1.00
Complete rankings at INTRL.SPORT

== February ==
=== North Macedonia men vs Malta in Australia ===
6 February 2022
16:00 AEDT (UTC+11:00)

North Macedonia	6–54	Malta
Tries: Racjinovski; Goals: Kulevski	News Report; Vlog	Tries: Galeano (3), Stone (2), Glanville (2), Rodrigues, Bradford, Dallas; Goals: Glanville (5), Galea (2)

Leichhardt Oval, Sydney
Attendance: 600
Referee: Sean Hampstead, Jeremy Anderson, Elio Forte

Team details

FB	1	Christian Srbinovski
WG	2	Tyler Vasilovski
CE	3	Jaydan Minovski
CE	4	Adam Misios
WG	5	Sean Metalovski
SO	6	Josh Moncaster
SH	7	Dean Racjinovski
PR	29	Lush Poulivaati
HK	9	Jake Mitrevski
PR	30	Harrison Apostolovski
SR	11	Dean Kulevski
SR	12	Jamie Miletic
LF	13	James Mirceski (c)
Interchange:
IN	8	Jesse Petro
IN	10	Jamie Karaguleski
IN	14	Mitch Stojanovski
IN	15	Aleks Stojoski
IN	16	Nick Donevski
IN	17	Nick Purdeski
IN	20	Josh Kosteski
IN	21	Angelo Racjinovski
IN	23	Angelo Avramovski
IN	24	Brad Moncaster
Coach:
Shane Flanagan

FB	1	Justin Rodrigues
WG	2	Nathan Benson
CE	3	Scott Galeano
CE	4	Emanuel Sultana
WG	5	Zarrin Galea
SO	6	Aidan Glanville
SH	7	Jono Dallas
PR	8	Kyal Greene
HK	9	Joel Bradford
PR	10	Blake Phillips
SR	11	Tyler Cassel (c)
SR	22	Ben Stone
LF	13	Kyle Cassel
Interchange:
IN	12	Ryan Azzopardi
IN	14	Aaron Grech
IN	16	Jake Scott
IN	17	Nathan Falzon
IN	18	Zachary Rodrigues
IN	19	Josh Vella
IN	20	Zachary Vella
IN	23	Jake Zammit
Coach:
Aaron McDonald

Touch judges:
Craig Rennie
Cooper Rennie

== March ==
=== Chile men vs Philippines in Australia ===
5 March 2022
14:30 AEDT (UTC+11:00)

Chile	36–20	Philippines
Tries: Horvat, Vasquez, Nitor-Alvear, Castillo-Sioni, Doberer, Bravo-Graham; Goals: Horvat (6)	Report (IRL); Highlights	Tries: Tootell, Sheedy, Jensen, Ubalodo; Goals: Gordon (2)

Pioneers Park, Sydney
Attendance: 300
Referee: Brad Kiehne (Australia)
Touch judges: Paul Eden (Australia), Robert Morey (Australia)

Team details

FB	1	Thomas Garrido
WG	2	Jayden Jorquera
CE	3	Junior Sandoval
CE	4	Ben Fisher
WG	5	Jose Nitor-Alvear
FE	6	Brad Millar
HB	11	James Horvat
PR	19	Jaden Liang
HK	9	Mana Castillo-Sioni
PR	10	Austin Olivares
SR	15	Diego Bravo-Graham
SR	12	Nick Doberer (c)
LK	13	Daniel Vasquez
Interchange:
BE	10	Alvin Elkes
BE	14	Patrick Caamano
BE	17	Nelson Iturrieta
BE	17	John Araya
Coach:
Andrew Charles

FB	1	Gerald Ubalodo
WG	2	Kevin Gordon
CE	3	Johansel Avery
CE	4	Isaac Rosario
WG	5	Richard Mante
FE	6	Gerald Reyes
HB	7	Marc Russell
PR	8	Sam Bennetts
HK	9	Paul Sheedy (c)
PR	10	Dylan Jones
SR	11	Kim De Leon
SR	12	Ellis Jensen
LK	13	Jeff Vaughan
Interchange:
BE	14	Tyrone Tootell
BE	15	Ben Jegede
BE	16	Blake Mackey
BE	17	Jordan Jones
Coach:
Glen Powers

== April ==
=== Canada women vs the United States ===
16 April 2022
14:30 PDT (UTC−07:00)

Canada	42–10	United States
Tries: Woods (3), Jones (2), Pakulis (2), Scholten, Siciliano; Goals: Naismith (2), McDaid	Report (IRL); Report (ERL); Video Replay	Tries: Fisch, Roach; Goals: Oliveri

Burnaby Lake Sports Complex, Burnaby

Team details

FB	1	Alanna Fittes
WG	2	Brittany Jones
CE	3	Ferris Sandboe
CE	4	Candace Scholten
WG	5	Petra Woods
SO	6	Natasha Naismith
SH	7	Sabrina McDaid
PR	8	Kristy Sargent
HK	9	Natalie Tam
PR	10	Elizabeth Steele
SR	11	Gabrielle Hindley
SR	12	Sarah Maguire
LF	13	Megan Pakulis
Interchange:
IN	14	Christina Burnham
IN	15	Ada Jane Okonkwo
IN	16	Demi Swann
IN	17	Zoey Siciliano
Coach:
Mike Castle

FB	1	Mackenzie Dirlam
WG	2	Kala Crawford
CE	3	Cait King
CE	4	Antares Lance
WG	5	Echo Hawton
SO	6	Robyn Oliveri
SH	7	Samantha Black-Keels
PR	8	Carolyn Roach
HK	9	Nicole Fisch
PR	10	Narcisse Jordan
SR	11	Jeanna Beard
SR	12	Kadie Sandford
LF	13	Lauren Trout
Interchange:
IN	14	Stacy Nemeth
IN	15	Bridget Kapinus
IN	16	Rachael Bradley
IN	17	Taylor White
Coach:
Adrian Cooney

=== Turkey men vs Australian Defence Force ===
Gallipoli Cup (Note: This match was a curtain raiser to an NRL fixture between the Sydney Roosters and the St. George Illawarra Dragons.)

25 April 2022
13:50 AEST (UTC+10:00)

Australian Defence Force	26–6	Turkey

Sydney Cricket Ground, Sydney

== May ==
=== Malta men vs Montenegro ===
Medieval Shield

14 May 2022
19:00 CEST (UTC+02:00)

Malta	66–6	Montenegro
Tries: Galea (3), J. Gatt, Sammut (3), Muscat, Zammit, Dimech (2), Camilleri; Goals: Sammut 9/12	Report (IRL); Report (ERL)	Tries: Zarkovic; Goals: Popovic

Charles Abela Memorial Stadium, Mosta
Referee: Jaroslav Bzoch (Czech Republic)

Team details

FB	1	Andrew Muscat
WG	2	Cameron Gatt
CE	3	Zarrin Galea
CE	4	Josh Gatt
WG	5	James Grech
FE	6	Karl Cassar
HB	7	Jarrod Sammut
PR	8	Dean Zammit
HK	9	Robin Cutajar
PR	10	Jean-Pierre Zarb
SR	11	Kane Dimech
SR	12	Chris Mercieca
LK	13	Joe Briggs
Interchange:
BE	14	Kyle Gauchi
BE	15	Mark Camilleri
BE	16	Nicholas Vella
BE	17	Nathan Gatt
Coach:
Roderick Attard

FB	1	Goran Vujovic
WG	2	Boban Banjevic
CE	3	Bogdan Raicevic
CE	4	Burim Brahimi
WG	5	Ilija Ivanovic
FE	6	Srdjan Popovic
HB	7	Mitar Boskovic
PR	8	Danilo Kosanovic
HK	9	Atanas Trimcheski
PR	10	Nikola Vasic
SR	11	Elvis Cemaj
SR	12	Igor Adzaip
LK	13	Balsa Zarkovic
Interchange:
BE	14	Vladan Celebic
BE	15	Jovan Petrovic
BE	16	Redzep Baljaj
BE	17	Janko Milovic
Coach:
Ian Giddings

== June ==
=== Ligue Occitanie vs Spain men ===
5 June 2022
16:00 CEST (UTC+02:00)

Ligue Occitanie	34–40	Spain

Stade Jep Maso, Saint-Laurent-de-la-Salanque
Attendance: 200

=== Brazil men vs South Africa in Australia ===
5 June 2022
15:00 AEST (UTC+10:00)

Brazil	0–82	South Africa
	Report (IRL)	Tries: Cutler 2, Cryer 2, Smith 2, Sweet 2, Hutchinson, De Vlieg, O'Donovan, Devries, Sparrow, Perry, Gulliver-Brown; Goals: Cryer 9/16

Noosa District Sports Complex, Tewantin
Attendance: 300
Referee: Tim Rutherford (Australia)
Player of the Match: Ethan Sweet (South Africa)

Team details

FB	1	Ravi Araujo
WG	2	Vinicius Guedes Silva
CE	3	Gabriel Domingues
CE	4	Steven Braga
WG	5	Otavio Dias
SO	6	Heitor Fleury
SH	7	Murilo Manzutti
PR	8	Diego Nogueira
HK	9	Simon De Araujo
PR	10	Renato Silva
SR	11	Fellipe Dittz
SR	12	Antonio Caleiro
LF	13	Donovan Barreira
Interchange:
IC	14	Rubens Gomes
IC	15	Dylan Nunes
IC	16	Rafael Melo
IC	17	Marco Mendes
Coach:
Paul Grundy

FB	1	Luke de Vlieg
WG	2	Jason Cutler
CE	3	Jean-Charl Smith
CE	4	Byron Hutchinson
WG	5	Darren O'Donovan
SO	6	Bevan Devries
SH	7	Kam Cryer
PR	8	Joel Tubbs
HK	9	Harry Blake
PR	10	Shane Gillham
SR	11	Ethan Sweet
SR	12	Brad Sparrow
LF	13	Aden Perry
Interchange:
IC	14	Jason King
IC	15	Kalum Gulliver-Brown
IC	16	Johan Louw
IC	17	Jovan Pienar
Coach:
Darryl Fisher

=== Women's European Championship B ===
11 June 2022
17:30 CEST (UTC+02:00)

Italy	6–30	Ireland
Tries: Menotti 80'; Goals: Pantaleoni (1/1)	Report (ERL)	Tries: Coleman (3) 2', 7', 16'; Cobain 30'; Lawless 38'; Willett 64'; Goals: Copley (2/5); McGuiness (1/1)

Pasian Di Pato Rugby Stadium, Udine
Attendance: 500
Referee: Tony Palacios (Spain)
Player of the Match: Ali Coleman (Ireland) & Rebecca Pantaleoni (Italy)

Team details
Italy		Position	Ireland
Name	Number	Position	Number	Name
Rebecca Pantaleoni	1	Fullback	1	Francessca Copley
Rwan Hassnien	2	Wing	2	Roisin Crowe
Giulia Colangeli	3	Centre	3	Bettie Lambert
Giada Arzenton	4	Centre	4	Steph Carroll
Camilla Matilde Giacomazzo	5	Wing	5	Ray Lawless
Alessandra Menotti	6	Stand off	6	Alex McGuinness
Cecilia Piva	7	Scrum half	7	Ella Synott
Marika Ascione	8	Prop forward	8	Mairead Quinn
Martina Dall'Antonia	9	Hooker	9	Erin Coll
Rosa Bettolatti	10	Prop forward	10	Clodagh Dunne
Siria Raisa	11	Second row	11	Storm Cobain
Altea Forto	12	Second row	12	Emma Curran
Virginia Pinarello	13	Loose forward	13	Ali Coleman
Marvin Severgnini	14	Interchange	14	Iona McCusker
Giulia Iozzia	15	Interchange	15	Stacy Hanley
Elisa Orofino	16	Interchange	16	Charlie Willett
Enrica Pandolfo	17	Interchange	17	Orla McCallion
Suin Pezzano		Coach		John Whalley

19 June 2022
13:00 BST (UTC+01:00)

Wales	60–0	Italy
Tries: R. Carr 3'; Michael 7'; Hughes 28'; Price (3) 39', 52', 60'; Davies 45'; King 56'; McGuire 71'; Marsh 74'; Sayle 78'; Goals: Salter (8/9)	Report (ERL); Report (WRL)

Pandy Park, Crosskeys
Attendance: 410
Referee: Fiona McConn (Ireland)
Touch judges: Rob Apsee (Wales), Chris Williams (Wales)

Team details
Wales		Position	Ireland
Name	Number	Position	Number	Name
Eleri Michael	1	Fullback	1	Rebecca Pantaleoni
Anne-Marie Sayle	2	Wing	2	Rwan Hassnien
Kathryn Salter	3	Centre	3	Giulia Colangeli
Rosie Carr	4	Centre	4	Silvia Gai
Brittony Price	5	Wing	5	Ludovica Gurrieri
Amberley Ruck	6	Stand off	6	Giada Arzenton
Rhi Parker	7	Scrum half	7	Alessandra Menotti
Lauren Aitken	8	Prop forward	8	Rosa Bettolatti
Carys Marsh	9	Hooker	9	Martina Dall'Antonia
Emily Hughes	10	Prop forward	10	Marika Ascione
Bryonie King	11	Second row	11	Marvin Severgnini
Charlie Mundy	12	Second row	12	Giulia Iozzia
Bethan Dainton	13	Loose forward	13	Virginia Pinarello
Molly Reardon	14	Interchange	14	Giulia Zaffarana
Joeann McGuire	15	Interchange	15	Camilla Matilde Giacomazzo
Fern Davies	16	Interchange	16	Siria Raisa
Katie Carr	17	Interchange	17	Altea Forto
Thomas Brindle		Coach		Coach:

25 September 2022
13:00 TRT (UTC+03:00)

Turkey	4–8	Greece
Tries: Sanliturk 13'	Report (ERL)	Tries: Koutsioumpa (2) 8', 75'

İTÜ Ayazağa Stadium, Istanbul
Referee: Stefan Stamenic (Serbia)

Team details
Turkey		Position	Greece
Name	Number	Position	Number	Name
Ozlem Kaya	1	Fullback	1	Magdelini Stavrianou
Derya Sanliturk	2	Wing	2	Dimitra Papoutsi
Gozde Gor	3	Centre	3	Irene Daslou
Aslihan Helvaci	4	Centre	4	Cleopatra Velmachou
Selin Ardal	5	Wing	5	Velissaria Koutsioumpa
Ecem Acıkgoz	6	Stand off	6	Antonia Voikli
Ece Tekin	7	Scrum half	7	Sofia-Margarita Kitsaneli
Hafize Berin Donmez	8	Prop forward	8	Maria-Anna Lamprou
Nurbanu Yorubulut	9	Hooker	9	Maria Avzoti
Elif Yilmaz	10	Prop forward	10	Maria-Eleni Gkirlemi
Elif Cinar	11	Second row	11	Magdelini Stavrianou,
lif Kutlu	12	Second row	12	Georgia-Fotini Koutsimpogeorgou
Nazife Taskin	13	Loose forward	13	Ourania Koutsikou
Meryem Savk	14	Interchange	14	Anna Spatharova
Tugcu Guvenc	15	Interchange	15	Asimina Mastoraki
Beyzanur Oktay	16	Interchange	16	Styliani Markou
Nazlican Filiz	17	Interchange	17	Chrysavgi Bakaloumi
Julien Treu		Coach		Stuart McLennan

2 October 2022
15:30 EEST (UTC+03:00)

Greece	28–0	Serbia
Tries: Koutsioumpa 8'; Velmachou 26'; Voikli (2) 46', 54'; Markou 71'; Stavrianou 79'; Goals: Kitsaneli (1/5); Velmachou (1/1)	Report (ERL)

Goritsa Stadium, Athens
Attendance: 400
Referee: Mike Smaill (New Zealand)
Touch judges: Aris Dardamanis (Greece), Nektarios Tsakalos (Greece)

Team details
Greece		Position	Serbia
Name	Number	Position	Number	Name
Magdelini Stavrianou	1	Fullback	1	Tamara Bošnjak
Velissaria Koutsioumpa	2	Wing	2	Ljiljana Bajic
Kleopatra Velmachou	3	Centre	3	Nika Bajic
Styliani Markou	4	Centre	4	Anastasija Karanovic
Dimitra Papoutsi	5	Wing	5	Katarina Veljanovsku
Antonia Voikli	6	Stand off	6	Jelena Stojiljkovic
Sofia-Margarita Kitsaneli	7	Scrum half	7	Karolina Blizanac
Maria-Anna Lamprou	8	Prop forward	8	Teodora Marin
Maria Avzoti	9	Hooker	9	Natasa Kovacevic
Maria-Eleni Gkirlemi	10	Prop forward	10	Jovana Fridl
Aspasia Stavrianou	11	Second row	11	Natalija Simic
Georgia-Fotini Koutsimpogeorgou	12	Second row	12	Sanja Starcevic
Ourania Koutsikou	13	Loose forward	13	Marija Maslakovic
Asimina Mastoraki	14	Interchange	14	Ksenija Bogojevic
Chrysavgi Bakaloumi	15	Interchange	15	Sanja Floric
Eirini Dakidi	16	Interchange	16	Natasa Vignjevic
Chrysi Lymperidi	17	Interchange	17	Marija Simovic

8 October 2022
15:00 IST (UTC+01:00)

Ireland	4–44	Wales
Tries: Coleman 2'	Report (WRL); Report (ERL)	Tries: Ruck 15'; Carr (2) 22', 36'; Mundy 41'; Aitken 46'; Burnell (2) 56', 75'; Reardon 66'; Goals: Salter (6/8)

Estuary Road, Dublin
Attendance: 350
Referee: Will Gilder (England)

Team details
Ireland		Position	Wales
Name	Number	Position	Number	Name
Louise Burgess	1	Fullback	1	Leanne Burnell
Bettie Lambert	2	Wing	2	Brittony Price
Francessca Copley	3	Centre	3	Kathryn Salter
Ray Lawless	4	Centre	4	Rosie Carr
Roisin Crowe	5	Wing	5	Eleri Michael
Alex McGuinness	6	Stand off	6	Amberley Ruck
Jemma Farrell	7	Scrum half	7	Rhi Parker
Mairead Quinn	8	Prop forward	8	Fern Davies
Iona McCusker	9	Hooker	9	Carys Marsh
Clodagh Dunne	10	Prop forward	10	Lauren Aitken
Storm Cobain	11	Second row	11	Bryonie King (c)
Alison Coleman	12	Second row	12	Charlie Mundy
Philippa Birchall (c)	13	Loose forward	13	Emily Hughes
Louise McGonagle	14	Interchange	14	Molly Reardon
Amy O'Neill	15	Interchange	15	Ffion Jones
Lisa Callan	16	Interchange	16	Katie Carr
Charlie Willett	17	Interchange	17	Joeann McGuire
John Whalley		Coach		Thomas Brindle

25 November 2022
14:00

Serbia	24–16	Turkey

TBA

Team details

FB	1
WG	2
CE	3
CE	4
WG	5
SO	6
SH	7
PR	8
HK	9
PR	10
SR	11
SR	12
LF	13
Interchange:
IN	14
IN	15
IN	16
IN	17
Coach:

FB	1
WG	2
CE	3
CE	4
WG	5
SO	6
SH	7
PR	8
HK	9
PR	10
SR	11
SR	12
LF	13
Interchange:
IN	14
IN	15
IN	16
IN	17
Coach:

=== Wales women vs England ===
12 June 2022
13:00 BST (UTC+01:00)

Wales	6–32	England
Tries: Burnell 62'; Goals: Ruck 1/1	Report (ERL); Report (WRL)	Tries: Goldthorp (2) 8', 15', Hardcastle 18', Hoyle 38', Jones 43', Dodd 78'; Goals: Stanley (4/6)

Pandy Park, Crosskeys
Attendance: 621
Referee: Eamonn Whelan (Ireland) To 67'
Kristoff Young (Wales) 67' onwards
Player of the Match: Leanne Burnell (Wales)

Team details

FB	1	Leanne Burnell
WG	2	Eleri Michael
CE	3	Seren Gough-Walters
CE	4	Rosie Carr
WG	5	Brittony Price
SO	6	Amberley Ruck
SH	7	Rhi Parker
PR	8	Ffion Jones
HK	9	Molly Reardon
PR	10	Sara Jones
SR	11	Bryonie King
SR	12	Charlie Mundy
LF	13	Emily Hughes
Interchange:
IN	14	Carys Marsh
IN	15	Kathryn Salter
IN	16	Fern Davies
IN	17	Bethan Dainton
Coach:
Thomas Brindle

FB	1	Tara-Jane Stanley
WG	2	Georgia Wilson
CE	3	Fran Goldthorp
CE	4	Amy Hardcastle
WG	5	Caroline Collie
SO	6	Zoe Harris
SH	7	Georgia Roche
PR	8	Grace Field
HK	9	Tara Jones
PR	10	Olivia Wood
SR	11	Emily Rudge
SR	12	Paige Travis
LF	13	Jodie Cunningham
Interchange:
IN	14	Shona Hoyle
IN	15	Hollie Dodd
IN	16	Beth Stott
IN	17	Dannielle Anderson
Coach:
Craig Richards

=== England women vs France ===
18 June 2022
15:15 BST (UTC+01:00)

England	36–10	France
Tries: Hardcastle (2), Roche (2), Dodd, Beevers, Goldthorp; Goals: Stanley	Report (RFL); Report (ERL)	Tries: Song Puche, Ramos; Goals: Ciria

Halliwell Jones Stadium, Warrington
Attendance: 5,630
Referee: James Jones (Wales)
Player of the Match: Laureane Biville (France)

Team details

FB	1	Tara-Jane Stanley
WG	2	Leah Burke
CE	3	Fran Goldthorp
CE	4	Amy Hardcastle
WG	5	Caitlin Beevers
SO	6	Courtney Winfield-Hill
SH	7	Georgia Roche
PR	8	Grace Field
HK	9	Tara Jones
PR	10	Olivia Wood
SR	11	Hollie Dodd
SR	12	Emily Rudge
LF	13	Jodie Cunningham
Interchange:
IN	14	Shona Hoyle
IN	15	Keara Bennett
IN	16	Paige Travis
IN	17	Vicky Whitfield
Coach:
Craig Richards

FB	1	Elisa Akpa
WG	2	Christina Song-Puche
CE	3	Laureane Biville
CE	4	Margot Canal
WG	5	Manon Samarra
SO	6	Elisa Ciria
SH	7	Alice Varela
PR	8	Gaelle Alvernhe
HK	9	Cyndia Mansard
PR	10	Elodie Pacull
SR	11	Sarah Menaa
SR	12	Perrine Nontsarrat
LF	13	Leila Bessahli
Interchange:
IN	14	Mailys Borak
IN	15	Dorine Samarra
IN	16	Anais Fourcroy
IN	17	Fanny Ramos
Coach:
Vincent Baloup

=== England men vs Combined Nations All Stars ===
18 June 2022
17:45 BST (UTC+01:00)

England	18–4	Combined Nations All Stars
Tries: Wardle 9', Williams 29', Bateman 43'; Goals: Tomkins (3/3)	Report (ERL)	Tries: Sio 66'; Goals: Martin (0/1)

Halliwell Jones Stadium, Warrington
Attendance: 9,343
Referee: Jack Smith (England)

Team details

FB	1	Sam Tomkins
WG	2	Tommy Makinson
CE	3	Kallum Watkins
CE	4	Jake Wardle
WG	5	Ryan Hall
SO	6	Jack Welsby
SH	7	George Williams
PR	8	Alex Walmsley
HK	9	Michael McIlorum
PR	10	Mike Cooper
SR	11	Liam Farrell
SR	12	Mike McMeeken
LF	13	John Bateman
Interchange:
IN	14	Paul McShane
IN	15	Joe Batchelor
IN	16	Matty Lees
IN	17	Mikołaj Olędzki
Coach:
Shaun Wane

FB	1	Peter Mata'utia
WG	2	Ken Sio
CE	3	Rhyse Martin
CE	4	Shaun Kenny-Dowall
WG	5	Mahe Fonua
SO	6	Jacob Miller
SH	7	Brodie Croft
PR	8	Ligi Sao
HK	9	Daryl Clark
PR	10	Zane Tetevano
SR	11	Kenny Edwards
SR	12	Kelepi Tanginoa
LF	13	Matt Prior
Interchange:
IN	14	Kruise Leeming
IN	15	Joe Lovodua
IN	16	Chris Satae
IN	17	David Fifita
Coach:
Ellery Hanley

=== France men vs Wales ===
19 June 2022
15:00 CEST (UTC+02:00)

France	34–10	Wales
Tries: Garcia 18', Goudemand 34', Pélissier 41', Jullien 56', Escaré 59', Bousquet 69'; Goals: Escaré (3), Mourgue (2)	Report (WRL); Report (ERL)	Tries: Butt 49', Grant 74'; Goals: Fozard

Stadium Municipal d'Albi, Albi
Attendance: 4,500
Referee: Liam Moore (England)

Team details

FB	1	Morgan Escaré
WG	2	Paul Macron
CE	3	Arthur Romano
CE	4	Michael Laguerre
WG	5	Fouad Yaha
SO	6	Arthur Mourgue
SH	7	César Rouge
PR	8	Romain Navarrete
HK	9	Alrix Da Costa
PR	10	Julian Bousquet
SR	11	Paul Séguier
SR	12	Benjamin Jullien
LF	13	Benjamin Garcia
Interchange:
IN	14	Éloi Pélissier
IN	15	Jordan Dezaria
IN	16	Justin Sangaré
IN	17	Mickaël Goudemand
Coach:
Laurent Frayssinous

FB	1	Mike Butt
WG	2	Dalton Grant
CE	3	Will Evans
CE	4	Luis Roberts
WG	5	Rhys Williams
SO	6	Matty Fozard
SH	7	Elliot Kear
PR	8	Anthony Walker
HK	9	Curtis Davies
PR	10	Ben Evans
SR	11	Chester Butler
SR	12	Bailey Antrobus
LF	13	Joe Burke
Interchange:
IN	14	Connor Davies
IN	15	Lewis Hulme
IN	16	Tom Hopkins
IN	17	Luke Thomas
Coach:
John Kear

=== Lebanon men vs Malta in Australia ===
Elias-Fenech Trophy

22 June 2022
19:39 AEST (UTC+09:00)

Lebanon	30–14	Malta
Tries: Yasmin (2) 4', 40'; Maarbani (2) 38', 73'; J. Rizk 28'; Kassis 45'; Goals: Maarbani (3)	Report (ERL); Report (IRL)	Tries: Pace 14'; Bradford 59'; Goals: Sammut (3)

Belmore Sports Ground, Sydney
Attendance: 3,000
Referee: Blake Williams (Australia)
Touch judges: Isaac El-Hassan (Australia), Harrison Baysarri (Australia)

Team details

FB	1	Josh Rizk
WG	2	Reece Robinson
CE	3	Bilal Maarbani
CE	4	Allan Lockwood
WG	5	Christian Yasmin
SO	6	Jabriel Kalache
SH	7	Adam Rizk
PR	8	Khalil Rahme
HK	9	Michael Tannous
PR	10	Hanna El Nachar
SR	11	Josh Maree
SR	12	Elie El-Zakhem
LF	13	Kayne Kalache (c)
Interchange:
IN	14	Danny Ghantos
IN	15	Daniel Arahu
IN	16	Jacob Karam
IN	17	Nick Kassis
Coach:
(Australia) Matt King

FB	1	Zarrin Galea
WG	2	Nathan Benson
CE	3	Nathan Falzon
CE	4	Hayden Pace
WG	5	Connor McDermott
SO	6	Joel Bradford
SH	7	Jarrod Sammut
PR	8	Tyler Cassel (c)
HK	9	Aaron Grech
PR	10	Kyal Greene
SR	11	Jake Zammit
SR	12	Kyle Cassel
LF	13	Tallis Duncan
Interchange:
IN	14	Josh Vella
IN	15	Adam Campbell
IN	16	Zachary Vella
IN	17	Anthony Bucca
Coach:
(Australia) Aaron McDonald

=== New Zealand vs Tonga double header ===
Women's

25 June 2022
15:00 NZST (UTC+12:00)

New Zealand	50–12	Tonga
Tries: P. McGregor 3'; Bartlett (2) 5', 45'; Vaha'akolo (2) 8', 34'; R. McGregor 17'; Turner 31'; Murdoch 38'; Wira-Kohu 42'; Albert-Jones 58'; Maynard 75'; Goals: Albert-Jones (3)	Report (IRL)	Tries: Polata 64'; Hifo 79'; Goals: Hifo (2)

Mount Smart Stadium, Auckland
Attendance: 18,312
Referee: Kasey Badger (Australia)
Touch judges: Joseph Green, Rochelle Tamarua

Team details

FB	1	Autumn-Rain Stephens-Daly
WG	2	Madison Bartlett
CE	3	Page McGregor
CE	4	Amy Turner
WG	5	Katelyn Vaha'akolo
FE	6	Laishon Albert-Jones
HB	7	Raecene McGregor
PR	8	Annetta Nu'uausala
HK	9	Krystal Rota (c)
PR	10	Mya Hill-Moana
SR	11	Roxette Murdoch
SR	12	Ngatokotoru Arakua
LK	13	Georgia Hale
Interchange:
IN	14	Nita Maynard
IN	15	Charlotte Scanlan
IN	16	Kararaina Wira-Kohu
IN	17	Christyl Stowers
CS	18	Karli Hansen (not used)
Coach:
(New Zealand) Ricky Henry

FB	1	Lavinia Tauhalaliku (c)
WG	2	Pier Pritchard
CE	3	Haylee Hifo
CE	4	Maatuleio Fotu-Moala
WG	5	Luisa Sekona
FE	6	China Polata
HB	7	Keisharn Hala
PR	8	Tegan Dymock
HK	9	Seli Mailangi
PR	10	Natasha Penitani
SR	11	Kimberly Nikua
SR	12	Shannon Muru
LK	13	Katrina Latu
Interchange:
IN	14	Monica Samita
IN	15	Kalosipani Hopoate
IN	16	Ana Taumalolo
IN	17	Amelia Mafi
CS	18	Noia Fotu-Moala (not used)
Coach:
(Tonga) Milton Dymock

Men's

25 June 2022
17:40 NZST (UTC+12:00)

New Zealand	26–6	Tonga
Tries: Hughes 3'; Rapana 7'; Mulitalo 30'; Papali'i 62'; Goals: Rapana (5)	Report (IRL)	Tries: S. Katoa 14'; Goals: Staggs

Mount Smart Stadium, Auckland
Attendance: 20,766
Referee: Grant Atkins (Australia)
Touch judges: Liam Kennedy (Australia), Paki Parkinson (New Zealand)
Player of the Match: Joseph Manu (New Zealand)

Team details

FB	1	Joseph Manu
WG	2	Ronaldo Mulitalo
CE	3	Marata Niukore
CE	4	Peta Hiku
WG	5	Jordan Rapana
FE	6	Dylan Brown
HB	7	Jahrome Hughes
PR	8	Jesse Bromwich
HK	9	Brandon Smith
PR	10	James Fisher-Harris
SR	11	Isaiah Papali'i
SR	12	Kenny Bromwich
LK	13	Joseph Tapine
Interchange:
IN	14	Kieran Foran
IN	15	Moses Leota
IN	16	Nelson Asofa-Solomona
IN	17	Briton Nikora
CS	18	Jordan Riki (not used)
Coach:
(Australia) Michael Maguire

FB	1	Toluta'u Koula
WG	2	Christian Tuipulotu
CE	3	Will Penisini
CE	4	Moses Suli
WG	5	Sione Katoa
FE	6	Kotoni Staggs
HB	7	Junior Amone
PR	8	Addin Fonua-Blake
HK	9	Siliva Havili
PR	10	Sio Siua Taukeiaho
SR	11	Sitili Tupouniua
SR	12	Keaon Koloamatangi
LK	13	Jason Taumalolo
Interchange:
IN	14	Soni Luke
IN	15	Haumole Olakau'atu
IN	16	Tevita Tatola
IN	17	Moeaki Fotuaika
CS	18	Joe Ofahengaue (not used)
Coach:
(Australia) Dean Young

=== Samoa men vs Cook Islands in Australia ===
25 June 2022
17:44 AEST (UTC+10:00)

Samoa	42–12	Cook Islands
Tries: May (2) 5', 60'; Nofoaluma (4) 9', 21', 57', 71'; Tago 12'; Paulo 77'; Goals: Milford (5)	Report (IRL)	Tries: Moale 54'; S. Marsters 64'; Goals: S. Marsters (2)

Campbelltown Stadium, Sydney
Attendance: 10,720
Referee: Peter Gough (Australia)
Touch judges: Darien Furner (Australia), Ziggy Przeklasa-Adamski (Australia)
Player of the Match: David Nofoaluma (Samoa)

Team details

FB	1	Charlie Staines
WG	2	Taylan May
CE	3	Izack Tago
CE	4	Jaxson Paulo
WG	5	David Nofoaluma
FE	6	Chanel Harris-Tavita
HB	7	Anthony Milford
PR	8	Martin Taupau
HK	9	Jazz Tevaga
PR	10	Francis Molo
SR	11	Josh Schuster
SR	12	Jaydn Su'a
LK	13	Josh Aloiai
Interchange:
IN	14	Fa'amanu Brown
IN	15	Keenan Palasia
IN	16	Spencer Leniu
IN	17	Bunty Afoa
CS	18	Mat Feagai (not used)
Coach:
(Australia) Matt Parish

FB	1	Kayal Iro
WG	2	Steven Marsters
CE	3	Anthony Gelling
CE	4	Reuben Rennie
WG	14	Geoff Daniela
FE	6	Esan Marsters
HB	7	Reece Joyce
PR	8	Vincent Rennie
HK	10	Tinirau Arona
PR	13	Xavier Willison
SR	11	Brendan Piakura
SR	12	Pride Pettersen-Robati
LK	15	Moses Noovao-McGreal
Interchange:
IN	9	Aaron Teroi
IN	16	Davvy Moale
IN	17	Makahesi Makatoa
IN	18	Reuben Porter
CS	19	Brodie Tamarua (not used)
Coach:
(New Zealand) Tony Iro

=== Fiji men vs Papua New Guinea in Australia ===
25 June 2022
20:02 AEST (UTC+10:00)

Fiji	14–24	Papua New Guinea
Tries: Naiqama 12'; Turuva (2) 54', 79'; Goals: Masima	Report (IRL)	Tries: Lam (2) 24', 74'; Yei 38'; Mead 66'; Goals: Laybutt (4)

Campbelltown Stadium, Sydney
Attendance: 10,515
Referee: Todd Smith (Australia)
Touch judges: Chris Sutton (Australia), Matt Noyen (Australia)
Player of the Match: Lachlan Lam (Papua New Guinea)

Team details

FB	1	Sunia Turuva
WG	2	Mikaele Ravalawa
CE	3	Semi Valemei
CE	4	Waqa Blake
WG	5	Maika Sivo
FE	6	Kevin Naiqama
HB	7	Nautu'a Masima
PR	8	Joseph Ratuvakacereivalu
HK	9	Penioni Tagituimua
PR	10	Tui Kamikamica
SR	11	Viliame Kikau
SR	16	Lamar Liolevave
LK	13	Taane Milne
Interchange:
IN	14	Isaac Lumelume
IN	15	Pio Seci
IN	16	Kaylen Miller
IN	17	Ralulu Nasoki
CS	22	Waqasaqa Qiolevu (not used)
Coach:
(Fiji) Joe Dakuitoga

FB	1	Alex Johnston
WG	2	Robert Derby
CE	3	David Mead
CE	4	Justin Olam
WG	22	Solo Wane
FE	6	Kyle Laybutt
HB	7	Lachlan Lam
PR	8	Epel Kapinias
HK	9	Wartovo Puara
PR	10	Sylvester Namo
SR	11	Daniel Russell
SR	12	Nixon Putt
LK	13	Jacob Alick
Interchange:
IN	14	Liam Horne
IN	15	Emmanuel Waine
IN	16	McKenzie Yei
IN	17	Dilbert Issac
CS	18	Junior Rop (not used)
Coach:
(Papua New Guinea) Stanley Tepend

== September ==
=== Spain men vs Netherlands ===
17 September 2022
15:00 CEST (UTC+02:00)

Spain	30–36	Netherlands
Tries: Yesa, Pallares, R. Garcia, Lowo, D. Garcia (58); Goals: Olivares (2/2), R. Garcia (3/3)	Report (ERL)	Tries: Koolstra (2), Schoenmaker (2), Idzera, Ngirubiu, Dovia; Goals: Idzera (4/4)

Campo del Rugby De El Bercial, Madrid
Referee: Andrew Pilkington (Spain)

Team details
Spain		Position	Netherlands
Name	Number	Position	Number	Name
Rafael Garcia	1	Fullback	1	Auke Idzera
Sadiq Lowo	2	Wing	2	Isaacs Ngirubiu
Benjamin Diaz	3	Centre	3	Sander Dovia
Jorge Gomez	4	Centre	4	Joran Schoenmaker
Antonio Puerta	5	Wing	5	Arie-Tjerk Razoux Schultz
Luc Franco	6	Stand off	6	Damon Koolstra
Romain Pallares	7	Scrum half	7	Laury Renac
Juan Mudarra	8	Prop forward	8	Mauricio Gomez Pazos
Miguel Olivares	9	Hooker	9	Lucas Gout
Valentin Yesa	10	Prop forward	10	Bonne Wilce
Mariano Martin	11	Second row	11	Paul Kuijpers
Daniel Garcia	12	Second row	12	Adam Braksator
Miguel Thomas	13	Loose forward	13	Paul Dirkzwager
Fran Garcia	14	Interchange	14	Ruben Stuifzand
Miguel Mudarra	15	Interchange	15	Frank Longhurst
Julien Ferrere	16	Interchange	16	Shadan Lavia
Emiliano Mecur	17	Interchange	17	Romeo Goldma
		Coach		Dave Hunter

=== Lebanon men vs Italy in Australia ===
24 September 2022
15:00 AEST (UTC+02:00)

Lebanon	22–4	Italy

Lidcombe Oval, Sydney

=== Netherlands men vs European Combined Nations ===
24 September 2022
16:00 CEST (UTC+02:00)

Netherlands	52–28	European Combined Nations (Note: Match was originally scheduled to be Netherlands vs Sweden but was replaced by a friendly against a European Combined Nations side.)

Zaandijk RC, Zaandam
Attendance: 217

=== Turkey men vs Bulgaria ===
25 September 2022
15:00 TRT (UTC+03:00)

Turkey	38–16	Bulgaria
Tries: Kose 7'; Duman (2) 22', 63'; Kuyumcuyan (2) 28', 33'; Keles (2) 39', 59'; Kose 67'; Goals: Ozbalak (3)	Report (ERL)	Tries: Dimitrov 37'; Slavin 42'; Atanasov 70'; Goals: Debrenliev, Rashev

İTÜ Ayazağa Stadium, Istanbul
Referee: Stefan Stamenic (Serbia)

Team details
Turkey		Position	Bulgaria
Name	Number	Position	Number	Name
Can Berk Uckuzular	1	Fullback	1	Simeon Tsvetanov
Batuhan Duman	2	Wing	2	Emil Savov
Kerem Keskin	3	Centre	3	Veselin Peichev
Atahan Kose	4	Centre	4	Ilia Dimitrov
Berat Altun	5	Wing	5	Amo Kehaia
Emin Erden	6	Stand off	6	Vladislav Parizov
Aras Kuyumcuyan	7	Scrum half	7	Kostadin Debrenliev
Mete Sencer Gole	8	Prop forward	8	James Mott
Ali Mert Ozbalak	9	Hooker	9	Tsvetan Rashev
Mustafa Can Aydin	10	Prop forward	10	Tinko Hristov
Sefa Can Demir	11	Second row	11	Mitko Atanasov
Algan Yilmaz	12	Second row	12	Doicho Slavin
Serhat Keles	13	Loose forward	13	Teodor Manchev
Kemal Yilmaz	14	Interchange	14	Mihail Georgiev
Furkan Guney	15	Interchange	15	Stilian Karchev
Emirhan Bilek	16	Interchange	16	Stanislav Borisov
Batuhan Kose	17	Interchange	17	Tihomir Simenov
		Coach		Adrien Frigola

=== MEA Championship ===
==== Semi-finals ====
27 September 2022
13:00 GMT (UTC±00:00)

Ghana	26–6	Kenya
Tries: Bless, Acheampang (2), Da Gama Odun(2); Goals: Da Gama Odun (3)	Report (ERL)	Tries: Matua; Goals: Hamed

University of Ghana Sports Grounds, Accra
Referee: Aaron Moore (England)

Team details
Ghana		Position	Kenya
Name	Number	Position	Number	Name
Isaac Akuoko	1	Fullback	1	Philemon Olang
Chris Ebo Da Gama Odun	2	Wing	2	Joel Inzuga
John Bless	3	Centre	3	Brian Mutua
Desmond Geotrah	4	Centre	4	Tony Khadhambi
William Pearce Biney	5	Wing	5	Collins Ochieng
Collins Ofosu	6	Stand off	6	Shabani Hamed
Sean Sabutey	7	Scrum half	7	John Awiti
Alibah Riddick Agrokwah	8	Prop forward	8	Horus Alela
Jonas Moorkar	9	Hooker	9	Denish Ndinya
Nigel Nhampim Sackey	10	Prop forward	10	Celestine Mboi
Emmanuel Acheampong	11	Second row	11	Reymond Ekutu
Bawah Bright	12	Second row	12	Paul Seda
Oliver Puman on Yelib	13	Loose forward	13	Eliakim Kichoi
Philp Asomani	14	Interchange	14	Victor Ochieng
Levi Osei	15	Interchange	15	Ramadhan Masete
Jordan Issac Annan	16	Interchange	16	Wycliff Ratemo
Johathan Adotey	17	Interchange	17	James Maranga
Andy Gilvary		Coach		John Mbai

27 September 2022
15:30 GMT (UTC±00:00)

Nigeria	36–2	Cameroon
Tries: Gabriel, Godwin, Lawal, Ayodeji (3), Okoro; Goals: Gabriel (3)	Report (ERL)	Goals: Nkouak

University of Ghana Sports Grounds, Accra
Referee: Aaron Moore (England)

Team details
Nigeria		Position	Cameroon
Name	Number	Position	Number	Name
Daniel John	1	Fullback	1	Watio Franck
Abdullah Balogun	2	Wing	2	Embella Mouhamed
Blank Tuoyo Egodo	3	Centre	3	Tientchem Manual
Olisa Kelvin	4	Centre	4	Nguele Hermand
Isah Lawal	5	Wing	5	Patrick Nkouak
Rio Osayomwambo	6	Stand off	6	Nzokou Martial
John Gabriel	7	Scrum half	7	Armel Damjda
Kalu Shedrack	8	Prop forward	8	Bekolo Elie
Nuhu Ibrahim	9	Hooker	9	Khalil Njoya
Ibrahim Suraj	10	Prop forward	10	Ndifor Paul
Daniel Okoro	11	Second row	11	Carol Manga
Jude Abrackson	12	Second row	12	Joufang Tabrice
Michsael Ayodeji	13	Loose forward	13	Cyrille Kamole
Jukien Godwin	14	Interchange	14	Lamarc Oudi
L Bashir Usman	15	Interchange	15	Bidjana Jean Claude
Emmauel Onyekwe	16	Interchange	16	Ngoufack Georgane
Yussef Akeem	17	Interchange	17	Fosso Ledoux
Bolu Fagborun		Coach		Kahlil Njoya

==== Third place play-off ====
1 October 2022
12:00 GMT (UTC±00:00)

Kenya	16–0	Cameroon
Tries: Olang, Bryon (2), Iuzuga	Report (ERL)

University of Ghana Sports Grounds, Accra
Referee: Aaron Moore (England)

Team details
Kenya		Position	Cameroon
Name	Number	Position	Number	Name
Philemon Olang	1	Fullback	1	Franck Watio
Ramadhan Masete	2	Wing	2	Mouhamed Embella
Collins Ochieng	3	Centre	3	Manuel De Porta
Lucky Byron	4	Centre	4	Cyrille Kamole
Jeol Inzuga	5	Wing	5	Hermand Nguele
Shabani Hamed	6	Stand off	6	Patrick Nkouak
Victor Ochieng	7	Scrum half	7	Martial Nzokou
Horus Alela	8	Prop forward	8	Armel Damdja Tankeu
Denish Ndinja	9	Hooker	9	Elie Bekolo
Paul Seda	10	Prop forward	10	Khalil Njoya
Tony Khamdambi	11	Second row	11	Paul Ndifor
James Maranga	12	Second row	12	Carol Manga
Eliakim Kichoi	13	Loose forward	13	Fabrice Joufang
Raymond Ekutu	14	Interchange
Brian Mutua	15	Interchange
Celestine Mboi	16	Interchange
Wycliffe Ratemo	17	Interchange
John Mbai		Coach		Kahlil Njoya

==== Final ====
1 October 2022
14:30 GMT (UTC±00:00)

Ghana	4–30	Nigeria
Tries: Bless Mensah (44'); Goals: John (3)	Report (ERL)	Tries: Egodo (15'), Ayodeji (20'), Okoro (25'), Omale (39'), Ayodeji (67'), Lawal (76')

University of Ghana Sports Grounds, Accra
Referee: Aaron Moore (England)

Team details
Ghana		Position	Nigeria
Name	Number	Position	Number	Name
Isaac Akuoko	1	Fullback	1	Daniel John
Chris da Gama	2	Wing	2	Isah Lawal
John Bless Mensah	3	Centre	3	Tuoyo Egodo
Desmond Geotrah	4	Centre	4	Olisa Kelvin
William Pearce Biney	5	Wing	5	Abdallah Balogun
Collins Ofosu	6	Stand off	6	Gabriel John
Sean Sabutey	7	Scrum half	7	Rio Osayomwanbo
Riddick Alibah	8	Prop forward	8	Ibrahim Suraj
Philip Asomani	9	Hooker	9	Isa Omale
Nigel Sackey	10	Prop forward	10	Emmanuel Onyekwe
Emmanuel AcheamPong	11	Second row	11	Jude Abrackson
Bahah Bright	12	Second row	12	Daniel Okoro
Oliver Puman	13	Loose forward	13	Michael Ayodeji
Jonas Moorkaar	14	Interchange	14	Julian Godwin
Levi Osei	15	Interchange	15	Bashir Usman
Jordan Annan	16	Interchange	16	Azuka Chika
Jonathon Adotey	17	Interchange	17	Yuseef Akeem
Andy Gilvary		Coach		Bolu Fagborun

== October ==
=== World Cup warm-up games in England ===
- Note: World Cup warm-up games are not designated as SIMs by the Internation Rugby League even if they are between two international sides.

7 October 2022
19:30 BST (UTC+01:00)

England	50–0	Fiji
Tries: Young 14', Ackers 23', Watkins 33', Williams 35', Batchelor 38', Thompson 46', McMeeken 49', Cooper 55', Hall 74'; Goals: Sneyd (7)	Report (ERL)

AJ Bell Stadium, Salford
Attendance: 6,849
Referee: Jack Smith (England)

Team details
England		Position	Fiji
Name	Number	Position	Number	Name
Jack Welsby	1	Fullback	1	Kevin Naiqama
Dom Young	2	Wing	2	Jason Qareqare
Kallum Watkins	3	Centre	3	Mikaele Ravalawa
Herbie Farnworth	4	Centre	4	Semi Valemei
Ryan Hall	5	Wing	5	Mitieli Vulikijapani
George Williams	6	Stand off	6	Sitiveni Moceidreke
Marc Sneyd	7	Scrum half	7	Brandon Wakeham
Chris Hill	8	Prop forward	8	King Vuniyayawa
Andy Ackers	9	Hooker	9	Penioni Tagituimua
Mike Cooper	10	Prop forward	10	Tui Kamikamica
Elliot Whitehead	11	Second row	11	Kaylen Miller
Mike McMeeken	12	Second row	12	Pio Seci
Victor Radley	13	Loose forward	13	Lamar Manuel-Liolevave
Liam Marshall	14	Interchange	14	Joseph Ratuvakacereivalu
Sam Powell	15	Interchange	15	Ben Nakubuwai
Luke Thompson	16	Interchange	16	Taniela Sadrugu
Tom Burgess	17	Interchange	17	Netane Masima
Michael McIlorum	18	Interchange	18	Siua Wong
Joe Batchelor	19	Reserve	19	Isaac Lumelume
Harry Smith	20	Interchange	20	Joe Taira
Jack Wardle	21	Interchange	21	Viliame Kikau
Shaun Wane		Coach		Jo Rabele

7 October 2022
19:45 BST (UTC+01:00)

Cumbria	28–12	Jamaica
Tries: Amor, Johnston, Teare, Ritson, Carter; Goals: Carter	Report (RFL); Report (APRL)	Tries: Wallace, Woodburn-Hall; Goals: Rush

Derwent Park, Workington
Attendance: 3,000
Referee: James Child (England)

Team details
Cumbria		Position	Jamaica
Name	Number	Position	Number	Name
Luke Cresswell	1	Fullback	1	Andrew Simpson
Tee Ritson	2	Wing	2	Mo Agoro
Brett Carter	3	Centre	3	Greg Johnson
Curtis Teare	4	Centre	4	Jacob Ogden
Andrew Bulman	5	Wing	5	Alex Young
Jake Carter	6	Stand off	6	James Woodburn-Hall
Ryan Johnson	7	Scrum half	7	Kieran Rush
Brad Singleton	8	Prop forward	8	Michael Lawrence
Jamie Doran	9	Hooker	9	Ashton Golding
Kyle Amor	10	Prop forward	10	Jordan Andrade
Perry Singleton	11	Second row	11	AJ Wallace
Ellis Gillam	12	Second row	12	Keenen Tomlinson
Steve Scholey	13	Loose forward	13	Joe Brown
Connor Saunders	14	Interchange	14	Bradley Ho
Gregg McNally	15	Interchange	15	Marvin Thompson
Jordan Thomson	16	Interchange	16	Khamisi McKain
Liam McAvoy	17	Interchange	17	Chevaughn Bailey
Luke Broadbent	18	Interchange	18	Abevia McDonald
		Reserve	19	Aaron Jones-Bishop
		Interchange	20	Renaldo Wade
Paul Crarey		Coach		Romeo Monteith

8 October 2022
14:00 BST (UTC+01:00)

France	12–48	Tonga
Tries: Sangare 30', Rouge 60'; Goals: Mourgue 2/2	Report (ERL)	Tries: Fifita (3) 7', 27', 65', Tu’ipulotu 15', Hurrell 46', Koula 70', Amone 75', Olakau’atu 79', Otukolo 80'; Goals: Taukei’aho (2/4), Katoa (4/5)

The Shay, Halifax
Attendance: 876
Referee: Marcus Griffiths (England)

Team details
France		Position	Tonga
Name	Number	Position	Number	Name
Escaré	1	Fullback	1	Niu
Yaha	2	Wing	2	Koula
Romano	3	Centre	3	Hurrell
Langi	4	Centre	4	Suli,
Marcon	5	Wing	5	Tu’ipulotu
Gigot	6	Stand off/Five eighth	6	Amone
Mourgue	7	Scrum half/Half back	7	Lolohea
Dezaria	8	Prop forward	8	Fonua-Blake
Da Costa	9	Hooker	9	Otukolo
Goudemand	10	Prop forward	10	Taukei’aho (c)
Jullien	11	Second row	11	Fifita
Séguier	12	Second row	12	Olakau’atu
Garcia (c)	13	Loose forward/Lock forward	13	Kolomatangi
Belmas	14	Interchange	14	Katoa
Sangaré	15	Interchange	15	Tatola
Puech	16	Interchange	16	Fotuaika
Pélissier	17	Interchange	17	Murdoch-Masila
Stefani	18	Interchange	18	Paasi
Le Cam	19	Reserve	19	Vete
Marion	20	Interchange	20	Fonua
Rougé	21	Interchange
Jouffret	22	Interchange

8 October 2022
13:30 BST (UTC+01:00)

Scotland	4–28	England Knights
Tries: Linnett	Report (ERL)	Tries: Thewlis (4), Broadbent, Litten; Goals: Russell 2

New Myreside, Edinburgh
Referee: Aaron Moore (England)
Player of the Match: John Thewlis

8 October 2022
15:00 BST (UTC+01:00)

Wales	22–38	Lebanon
Tries: Curtis Davies (2), K Evans, Walker; Goals: Kear (2), Olds	Report (ERL); Report (WRL)	Tries: Rajeb, Kiraz, El-Zakhem, Tannous, Mansour, Maroun, Maabani, Kazzi; Goals: Doueihi 2, Miski

Heywood Road, Sale
Attendance: 509
Referee: Tom Grant (England)

Team details
Wales		Position	Lebanon
Name	Number	Position	Number	Name
Mike Butt	1	Fullback	1	Jacob Kiraz
James Olds	2	Wing	2	Abbas Miski
Rhys Evans	3	Centre	3	Reece Robinson
Luis Roberts	4	Centre	4	Brad Morkos
Rhys Williams	5	Wing	5	Josh Mansour
Ollie Olds	6	Stand off	6	Adam Doueihi
Josh Ralph	7	Scrum half	7	Khaled Rajab
Anthony Walker	8	Prop forward	8	Toufic El Hajj
Matty Fozard	9	Hooker	9	Mikey Tannous
Dan Fleming	10	Prop forward	10	Hanna El-Nachar
Rhodri Lloyd	11	Second row	11	Elie El-Zakhem
Bailey Antrobus	12	Second row	12	Josh Maree
Gavin Bennion	13	Loose forward	13	James Roumanos
Caleb Aekins	14	Interchange	14	Jalal Bazzaz
Joe Burke	15	Interchange	15	Anthony Layoun
Chester Butler	16	Interchange	16	Andrew Kazzi
Connor Davies	17	Interchange	17	Bilal Maarbani
Curtis Davies	18	Reserve	18	Michel Toum
Ben Evans	19	Reserve	19	Jaxson Rahme
Kyle Evans	20	Interchange	20	Tony Maroun
Will Evans	21	Interchange	21	Khalil Rahme
Dalton Grant	22	Interchange	22	Robin Hachache
Tom Hopkins	23	Interchange	23	Kahil Bejjani
Elliot Kear	24	Interchange	24	Sol Mokdad
John Kear		Coach		Michael Cheika

8 October 2022
15:00 BST (UTC+01:00)

Bradford Bulls	34–34	Greece
	Report (RFL)

Odsal Stadium, Bradford
Attendance: 950
Referee: Liam Rush (England)

8 October 2022
18:00 BST (UTC+01:00)

Leeds Rhinos	0–74	New Zealand
	Report (RFL)

Headingley Stadium, Leeds
Attendance: 9,125
Referee: Robert Hicks (England)

=== Bulgaria men vs Malta ===
8 October 2022
17:30 EEST (UTC+03:00)

Bulgaria	6–50	Malta
Tries: Slavin; Goals: Debrenliev	Report (ERL)	Tries: Galea 4, Gatt 2, Cassar, Jewitt, Debono; Goals: Galea 7

Stadium Trebich, Sofia
Referee: Lazar Zivkovic (Serbia)

Team details
Bulgaria		Position	Malta
Name	Number	Position	Number	Name
James Sherwood	1	Fullback	1	Zarrin Galea
Simeon Tsvetanov	2	Wing	2	Jean Scholey
Vladislav Parizov	3	Centre	3	Alfie Jewitt
Denis Ivanov	4	Centre	4	Reece Dimeech
Mihail Georgiev	5	Wing	5	Mark Camilleri
Tsvetan Rashev	6	Stand off	6	Karl Cassar
Kostadin Debrenliev	7	Scrum half	7	Louis Singleton
Georgi Vаklinov	8	Prop forward	8	Dean Zammit
Boris Spirov	9	Hooker	9	Nicky Vella
Miroslav Debreliev	10	Prop forward	10	Jean-Pierre Zarb
Hristian Ivanov	11	Second row	11	Kaine Dimeech
Doicho Slavin	12	Second row	12	Justin Davenport
Teodor Manchev	13	Loose forward	13	Josh Gatt
Thomas Roshe	14	Interchange	14	Luke Musu
Stanislav Borisov	15	Interchange	15	Aiden Demicoli
Antonio Ivanov	16	Interchange	16	William Watts
James Mott	17	Interchange	17	Peter Debano
Adrien Frigola		Coach		Roderick Attard

=== Griffin Cup ===
8 October 2022
16:00 CEST (UTC+02:00)

Netherlands	24–29	Germany
Tries: Razoux Schultz (8), Prins (53), P Kuijpers (57), van Kleij (75); Goals: Renac (1/1), K Kuijpers (3/4)	Report (ERL)	Tries: Amefia (10), White (14), Ryder (21, 38), Hartwich (50); Goals: Billsborough (4/5); Drop goals: Billsborough

British School, Voorschoten
Attendance: 500
Referee: Misa Vakadranu (Fiji)
Touch judges: Moray Gilland (Scotland), Hans Verveer (Netherlands), Colin O’Shaughnessy (Ireland), Szymon Jankowiak (Poland)

Team details
Netherlands		Position	Germany
Name	Number	Position	Number	Name
Hamish Wragg	1	Fullback	1	Aarre Heinrichsen
Isaac Ngirubiu	2	Wing	2	Benedikt Esser
Mike Prins	3	Centre	3	Adam Ryder
Gideon van Kleij	4	Centre	4	Felix Rau
Arie-Tjerk Razoux Schultz	5	Wing	5	Niklas Hartwich
Laury Renac	6	Stand off	6	Ben White
Will Johnston	7	Scrum half	7	Brad Billsborough
Mauricio Gomez Pazos	8	Prop forward	8	Jack Baskerville
Paul Dirkzwager	9	Hooker	9	Liam Doughton
Bonne Wilce	10	Prop forward	10	Kilian Martin
Paul Kuijpers	11	Second row	11	Eoin Bowie
Kees Kuijpers	12	Second row	12	Christophe Ngondi
Frank Longhurst	13	Loose forward	13	Mawuli Amefia
Lucas Gout	14	Interchange	14	Sebastian Paaßen
Edson Neves	15	Interchange	15	Charlie Tetley
Romeo Goldman	16	Interchange	16	Dany Doukeng Kongmo Ngo
Mark van den Broe	17	Interchange	17	Malte Rohemose
Kane Krlic		Coach		Bob Doughton

=== El Salvador men vs Japan in Australia ===
9 October 2022
15:00 ADST (UTC+11:00)

El Salvador	24–26	Japan
Tries: M Maatouk (2), Rodriguez, Alarcon; Goals: Rodriguez (4/4)	Report (ERL)	Tries: Szeremeta (2), Mochizuki, Hooper, Dury; Goals: Sano (3/6)

Pioneers Park, Sydney
Referee: Marco Levy (Australia)

Team details
El Salvador		Position	Japan
Name	Number	Position	Number	Name
Anthony Maatouk	1	Fullback	1	Travis Dury
Brandon Rodriguez	2	Wing	2	Hashimoto Shunnosuke
Carlos Kiwi Kiwi	3	Centre	3	Yuchi Mori
Albert Maatouk	4	Centre	4	Yuki Mochizuki
Ethan Rushworth	5	Wing	5	So Miyake
Dario Rodriguez	6	Five eighth/Stand off	6	Tai Hooper
Alvaro Alarcon	7	Half back/Scrum half	7	Reji Sano
Herman Guzman Godinez	8	Prop forward	8	Hiroshi Fukasawa
Michael Maatouk	9	Hooker	9	Kazuki Fukushige
Rafael Mendoza	10	Prop forward	10	Anrew Koji Williams
Elias Diaz	11	Second row	11	Kazuki Otake
Junior Alarcon	12	Second row	12	Seiya Kakuta
Oscar Mendoza	13	Lock forward/Loose forward	13	Darcy Heaney
Roberto Perez Velasco	14	Interchange	14	Ken Szeremeta
Zackery Fernandez	15	Interchange	15	Edward Craig
Franciso Godinez Pena	16	Interchange	16	Thomas Bowes
Javier Alaron	17	Interchange	17	Kenji Ball

=== Philippines men vs Thailand in Australia ===
9 October 2022
15:00 AEST (UTC+10:00)

Philippines	34–16	Thailand

Davies Park, Brisbane

=== Slovakia men vs Poland ===
29 October 2022
14:00 CEST (UTC+02:00)

Slovakia	18–22	Poland

Rugby Klub Bratislava, Bratislava

=== World Cup ===
==== Group stage ====
Pos	Team	Pld	W	D	L	PF	PA	PD	Pts	Qualification
1	England (H)	3	3	0	0	196	28	+168	6	Advance to knockout stage
2	Samoa	3	2	0	1	140	68	+72	4	Advance to knockout stage
3	France	3	1	0	2	56	116	−60	2	
4	Greece	3	0	0	3	20	200	−180	0	

Source: rlwc2021
(H) Hosts

Pos	Team	Pld	W	D	L	PF	PA	PD	Pts	Qualification
1	Australia	3	3	0	0	192	14	+178	6	Advance to knockout stage
2	Fiji	3	2	0	1	98	60	+38	4	Advance to knockout stage
3	Italy	3	1	0	2	38	130	−92	2	
4	Scotland	3	0	0	3	18	142	−124	0	

Source: rlwc2021

Pos	Team	Pld	W	D	L	PF	PA	PD	Pts	Qualification
1	New Zealand	3	3	0	0	150	28	+122	6	Advance to knockout stage
2	Lebanon	3	2	0	1	118	60	+58	4	Advance to knockout stage
3	Ireland	3	1	0	2	72	82	−10	2	
4	Jamaica	3	0	0	3	20	190	−170	0	

Source: rlwc2021

Pos	Team	Pld	W	D	L	PF	PA	PD	Pts	Qualification
1	Tonga	3	3	0	0	148	34	+114	6	Advance to knockout stage
2	Papua New Guinea	3	2	0	1	86	40	+46	4	Advance to knockout stage
3	Cook Islands	3	1	0	2	44	136	−92	2	
4	Wales	3	0	0	3	18	86	−68	0	

Source: rlwc2021

15 October 2022
14:30 BST (UTC+01:00)

England	60–6	Samoa
Tries: Welsby 22'; Young (2) 25', 30'; Watkins 49'; Farnworth 65'; Whitehead (2) 69', 71'; Makinson 74'; Williams 76'; Burgess 80'; Goals: Makinson (10/12) 6' pen, 23', 26', 49', 63' pen, 66', 69', 71', 74', 79'	Report	Tries: Tago 34'; Goals: Crichton (1/1) 35'

St James' Park, Newcastle
Attendance: 43,199
Referee: Ashley Klein (Australia)
Touch judges: Jack Smith (England), Warren Turley (England)
Player of the Match: Victor Radley (England)

Team details
England		Position	Samoa
Name	Number	Position	Number	Name
Sam Tomkins	1	Fullback	1	Joseph Suaalii
Tommy Makinson	2	Wing	18	Hamiso Tabuai-Fidow
Kallum Watkins	3	Centre	3	Izack Tago
Herbie Farnworth	4	Centre	4	Stephen Crichton
Dom Young	14	Wing	5	Brian To'o
Jack Welsby	6	Stand off/Five eighth	6	Jarome Luai
George Williams	7	Scrum half/Half back	7	Anthony Milford
Tom Burgess	8	Prop forward	8	Josh Papali'i
Micky McIlorum	9	Hooker	9	Danny Levi
Chris Hill	18	Prop forward	10	Junior Paulo
Elliott Whitehead	11	Second row	12	Jaydn Su'a
Mike McMeeken	20	Second row	13	Josh Aloiai
Victor Radley	13	Loose forward/Lock forward	24	Braden Hamlin-Uele
Luke Thompson	10	Interchange	14	Tyrone May
Morgan Knowles	15	Interchange	16	Spencer Leniu
Matty Lees	16	Interchange	17	Martin Taupau
Mike Cooper	17	Interchange	22	Kelma Tuilagi
Shaun Wane		Coach		Matt Parish
Rugby League Project

15 October 2022
19:30 BST (UTC+01:00)

Australia	42–8	Fiji
Tries: Nanai 16'; Addo-Carr (2) 24', 68'; Crichton 35'; Mitchell 44'; Grant 54'; Tedesco 61'; Goals: Holmes (7/7) 16', 25', 36', 45', 54', 61', 68'	Report	Tries: Valemei 4'; Turuva 76'; Goals: Wakeham (0/2)

Headingley Stadium, Leeds
Attendance: 13,366
Referee: Chris Kendall (England)
Touch judges: Wyatt Raymond (Australia), Darian Furner (Australia)
Player of the Match: Cameron Munster (Australia)

Team details
Australia		Position	Fiji
Name	Number	Position	Number	Name
James Tedesco (c)	1	Fullback	1	Sunia Turuva
Josh Addo-Carr	9	Wing	5	Mitieli Vulikijapani
Latrell Mitchell	8	Centre	4	Kevin Naiqama (c)
Valentine Holmes	4	Centre	19	Semi Valemei
Murray Taulagi	23	Wing	2	Maika Sivo
Cameron Munster	7	Stand off/Five eighth	6	Sitiveni Moceidreke
Daly Cherry-Evans	2	Scrum half/Half back	7	Brandon Wakeham
Tino Fa'asuamaleaui	18	Prop forward	17	King Vuniyayawa
Ben Hunt	3	Hooker	9	Apisai Koroisau
Jake Trbojevic	5	Prop forward	13	Tui Kamikamica
Angus Crichton	17	Second row	12	Viliame Kikau
Jeremiah Nanai	22	Second row	22	Siua Wong
Cameron Murray	11	Loose forward/Lock forward	16	Lamar Manuel-Liolevave
Harry Grant	20	Interchange	14	Penioni Tagituimua
Reuben Cotter	16	Interchange	23	Jowasa Drodrolagi
Patrick Carrigan	13	Interchange	10	Ben Nakubuwai
Jack Wighton	17	Interchange	11	Taniela Sadrugu
Mal Meninga		Coach		Wise Kativerata
Rugby League Project

16 October 2022
14:30 BST (UTC+01:00)

Scotland	4–28	Italy
Tries: Walmsley 76'; Goals: Brierley (0/1)	Report	Tries: Polselli 10'; Parata 23'; Maizen (3) 44', 49', 74'; Goals: Campagnolo (4/5) 10', 23' 45', 74'

Kingston Park, Newcastle
Attendance: 6,206
Referee: Todd Smith (Australia)
Touch judges: Paki Parkinson (New Zealand), Marcus Griffiths (England)
Player of the Match: Nathan Brown (Italy)

Team details
Scotland		Position	Italy
Name	Number	Position	Number	Name
Ryan Brierley	7	Fullback	1	Luke Polselli
Matty Russell	2	Wing	2	Richard Lepori
Kieran Buchanan	4	Centre	3	Daniel Atkinson
Bayley Liu	23	Centre	4	Ethan Natoli
Lachlan Walmsley	5	Wing	5	Jake Maizen
Bailey Hayward	6	Stand off	6	Jack Campagnolo
Calum Gahan	19	Scrum half	7	Radean Robinson
Logan Bayliss-Brow	8	Prop forward	10	Anton Iaria
Liam Hood	9	Hooker	9	Dean Parata
Sam Luckley	10	Prop forward	15	Luca Moretti
Euan Aitken	11	Second row	11	Ryan King
Kane Linnett	12	Second row	12	Brenden Santi
James Bell	13	Loose forward	13	Nathan Brown
Ben Hellewell	3	Interchange	14	Joe Tramontana
Luke Bain	15	Interchange	15	Luke Hodge
Kyle Schneider	14	Interchange	16	Gioele Celerino
Dale Ferguson (yellow card) 37'	24	Interchange	17	Jack Colovatti
Rugby League Project

16 October 2022
17:00 BST (UTC+01:00)

Jamaica	2–48	Ireland
Goals: Rush 1/1 (39' pen)	Report	Tries: L. Senior (2) 13', 64'; G. King 16'; O'Hagan 19'; Chamberlain 37'; I. Senior 52'; T. King 57'; McDonnell 72'; Bentley 77'; Halton 80'; Goals: Chamberlain (1/5) 20'; Keyes (3/5) 57', 64', 77'

Headingley Stadium, Leeds
Attendance: 6,320
Referee: Ben Casty (France)
Touch judges: Geoffrey Poumes (France), Neil Horton (England)
Player of the Match: Luke Keary (Ireland)

Team details
Jamaica		Position	Ireland
Name	Number	Position	Number	Name
Ben Jones-Bishop	1	Fullback	1	Richie Myler
Mo Agoro	2	Wing	2	Louis Senior
Greg Johnson	3	Centre	3	Ed Chamberlain
Jacob Ogden	4	Centre	4	Toby King
Alex Young	5	Wing	5	Innes Senior
James Woodburn-Hall	6	Stand off/Five eighth	6	Luke Keary
Kieran Rush	7	Scrum half/Half back	7	Joe Keyes
Jordan Andrade	8	Prop forward	8	Liam Byrne
Ashton Golding	9	Hooker	9	Josh Cook
Michael Lawrence	10	Prop forward	10	Jaimin Jolliffe
AJ Wallace	11	Second row	11	James Bentley
Chevaughn Bailey	12	Second row	12	Frankie Halton
Joe Brown	13	Loose forward/Lock forward	13	George King
Aaron Jones-Bishop	14	Interchange	14	Harry Rushton
Bradley Ho	15	Interchange	15	James McDonnell
Keenan Tomlinson	16	Interchange	16	Brendan O'Hagan
Ross Peltier	17	Interchange	17	James Hasson
Rugby League Project

16 October 2022
19:30 BST (UTC+01:00)

New Zealand	34–12	Lebanon
Tries: K. Bromwich 6'; Asofa-Solomona 25'; Hiku 30'; Brown 55'; Manu 57'; Rapana 61'; Goals: Rapana (5/6) 6', 25', 31', 55', 58'	Report	Tries: Mansour 1'; Miski 46'; Goals: Moses (2/2) 1', 47'

Halliwell Jones Stadium, Warrington
Attendance: 5,453
Referee: Grant Atkins (Australia)
Touch judges: Tom Grant (England), Dean Bowmer (England)
Player of the Match: Joseph Manu (New Zealand)

Team details
New Zealand		Position	Lebanon
Name	Number	Position	Number	Name
	1	Fullback	1
	2	Wing	2
	3	Centre	3
	4	Centre	4
	5	Wing	5
	6	Stand off/Five eighth	6
	7	Scrum half/Half back	7
	8	Prop forward	8
	9	Hooker	9
	10	Prop forward	10
	11	Second row	11
	12	Second row	12
	13	Loose forward/Lock forward	13
		Interchange
		Interchange
		Interchange
		Interchange
Rugby League Project

17 October 2022
19:30 BST (UTC+01:00)

France	34–12	Greece
Tries: Dezaria 9'; Gigot 30'; Jullien (2) 34', 74'; Mourgue 47'; Goals: Mourgue (7/7) 10', 24' pen, 30', 36', 49', 67' pen, 76'	Report	Tries: Taukamo 56'; Mougios 79'; Goals: Ilias (2/2) 58', 80'

Eco-Power Stadium, Doncaster
Attendance: 4,182
Referee: Adam Gee (Australia)
Touch judges: Kasey Badger (Australia), James Vella (England)
Player of the Match: Benjamin Garcia (France)

Team details
France		Position	Greece
Name	Number	Position	Number	Name
Morgan Escaré	1	Fullback	1	Chaise Robinson
Arthur Romano	2	Wing	2	Siteni Taukamo
Samisoni Langi	3	Centre	3	Terry Constantinou
Matthieu Laguerre	4	Centre	4	Nick Mougios
Fouad Yaha	5	Wing	5	Johnny Mitsias
Arthur Mourgue	6	Stand off/Five eighth	6	Lachlan Ilias
Tony Gigot	7	Scrum half/Half back	7	Jordan Meads
Jordan Dezaria	8	Prop forward	8	Robert Tuliatu
Alrix Da Costa	9	Hooker	9	Peter Mamouzelos
Lambert Belmas	10	Prop forward	16	Sebastian Sell
Benjamin Jullien	11	Second row	11	Mitchell Zampetides
Paul Séguier	12	Second row	12	Nicholas Flocas
Benjamin Garcia	13	Loose forward/Lock forward	13	Billy Magoulias
Eloi Pelissier	14	Interchange	14	Jake Kambos
Justin Sangaré	15	Interchange	15	Myles Gal
Mickaël Goudemand	17	Interchange	17	Theodoros Nianiakas
Corentin Le Cam	19	Interchange	18	Aris Dardamanis
Rugby League Project

18 October 2022
19:30 BST (UTC+01:00)

Tonga	24–18	Papua New Guinea
Tries: Penisini 14'; Fotuaika 35'; I. Katoa 37'; Koloamatangi 78'; Goals: I. Katoa (4/5) 16', 36', 39', 79'	Report	Tries: Martin 6'; Lam 41'; Russell 68'; Goals: Martin (3/3) 7', 43', 69'

Totally Wicked Stadium, St Helens
Attendance: 10,409
Referee: Liam Moore (England)
Touch judges: James Child (England), Belinda Sharpe (Australia)
Player of the Match: Edwin Ipape (Papua New Guinea)

Team details
Tonga		Position	Papua New Guinea
Name	Number	Position	Number	Name
Tolutau Koula	20	Fullback	1	Alex Johnston
Daniel Tupou	2	Wing	20	Rodrick Tai
Mosese Suli	19	Centre	3	Nene MacDonald
Will Penisini	4	Centre	4	Justin Olam
Sione Katoa	5	Wing	15	Dan Russell
Isaiya Katoa	24	Stand off/Five eighth	6	Kyle Laybutt
Tuimoala Lolohea	7	Scrum half/Half back	7	Lachlan Lam
Addin Fonua-Blake	8	Prop forward	8	Wellington Albert
Keaon Koloamatangi	12	Hooker	9	Edwin Ipape
Tevita Tatola	16	Prop forward	10	Sylvester Namo
Felise Kaufusi	11	Second row	11	Nixon Putt
Haumole Olakau'atu	15	Second row	12	Rhyse Martin
Siosiua Taukeiaho	10	Loose forward/Lock forward	13	Jacob Alick
Soni Luke	14	Interchange	23	Watson Boas
Moeaki Fotuaika	17	Interchange	16	McKenzie Yei
David Fifita	18	Interchange	17	Emmanuel Waine
Siosifa Talakai	3	Interchange	18	Keven Appo
Kristian Woolf		Coach		Stanley Tepend
Rugby League Project

19 October 2022
19:30 BST (UTC+01:00)

Wales	12–18	Cook Islands
Tries: Lloyd 13'; Olds 27'; Goals: Fozard (2/2) 15', 29'	Report	Tries: Gelling 22'; Moale 59'; S. Marsters 64'; Goals: S. Marsters (3/4) 24', 40' pen, 61'

Leigh Sports Village, Leigh
Attendance: 6,188
Referee: Robert Hicks (England)
Touch judges: Rochelle Tamarua (New Zealand), Todd Smith (Australia)
Player of the Match: Johnathon Ford (Cook Islands)

Team details
Wales		Position	Cook Islands
Name	Number	Position	Number	Name
Caleb Aekins	1	Fullback	1	Kayal Iro
Mike Butt	19	Wing	2	Steven Marsters
Will Evans	4	Centre	3	Anthony Gelling
Elliot Kear	6	Centre	4	Reubenn Rennie
Rhys Williams	2	Wing	5	Paul Ulberg
Ollie Olds	14	Stand off/Five eighth	6	Esan Marsters
Josh Ralph	7	Scrum half/Half back	7	Johnathon Ford
Anthony Walker	8	Prop forward	8	Pride Petterson-Robati
Matty Fozard	9	Hooker	9	Aaron Teroi
Dan Fleming	10	Prop forward	10	Tepai Moeroa
Rhodri Lloyd	11	Second row	11	Dominique Peyroux
Bailey Antrobus	17	Second row	12	Reuben Porter
Joe Burke	16	Loose forward/Lock forward	13	Zane Tetevano
Chester Butler	12	Interchange	14	Makahesi Makatoa
Ben Evans	13	Interchange	15	Davvy Moale
Curtis Davies	15	Interchange	16	Rua Ngatikaura
Connor Davies	18	Interchange	17	Brad Takairangi
John Kear		Coach		Tony Iro
Rugby League Project

21 October 2022
19:30 BST (UTC+01:00)

Australia	84–0	Scotland
Tries: Addo-Carr (4) 6', 32', 49', 79'; Wighton (2) 11', 35'; Crichton 15'; Graham (3) 21', 59', 74'; Cleary 28'; Tedesco 41'; Hunt 44'; Burton 66'; Yeo 77'; Goals: Cleary (12/15) 12', 16', 23', 30', 34', 36', 42', 45', 50', 67', 75', 78'	Report

Coventry Building Society Arena, Coventry
Attendance: 10,276
Referee: Grant Atkins (Australia)
Touch judges: Kasey Badger (Australia), Warren Turley (England)
Player of the Match: Josh Addo-Carr (Australia)

Team details
Australia		Position	Scotland
Name	Number	Position	Number	Name
James Tedesco	1	Fullback	22	Alex Walker
Josh Addo-Carr	9	Wing	2	Matty Russell
Matt Burton	12	Centre	3	Ben Hellewell
Jack Wighton	10	Centre	4	Kieran Buchanan
Campbell Graham	19	Wing	5	Lachlan Walmsley
Cameron Munster	7	Stand off/Five eighth	19	Calum Gahan
Nathan Cleary	14	Scrum half/Half back	8	Bayley Howard
Reagan Campbell-Gillard	6	Prop forward	9	Logan Bayliss-Brow
Harry Grant	20	Hooker	18	Liam Hood
Patrick Carrigan	13	Prop forward	18	Jack Teanby
Angus Crichton	17	Second row	11	Euan Aitken
Liam Martin	21	Second row	12	Kane Linnett
Isaah Yeo	24	Loose forward/Lock forward	13	James Bell
Ben Hunt	3	Interchange	14	Kyle Schneider
Valentine Holmes	4	Interchange	15	Luke Bain
Jake Trbojevic	5	Interchange	16	Guy Graham
Lindsay Collins	15	Interchange	24	Dale Ferguson
Rugby League Project

22 October 2022
14:30 BST (UTC+01:00)

Fiji	60–4	Italy
Tries: Kikau (2) 9', 23'; Naiqama 12'; Tagituimua (2) 15', 46'; Koroisau 37'; Nakubuwai 51'; Sivo (2) 53', 63'; Sadrugu 79'; Goals: Wakeham (7/7) 10', 13', 17', 25', 38', 47', 51'; Koroisau (2/2) 55', 65'; Raiwalui (1/1) 80'	Report	Tries: Maizen 56'; Goals: Campagnolo (0/1)

Kingston Park, Newcastle
Attendance: 3,675
Referee: Jack Smith (England)
Touch judges: Darian Furner (Australia), James Vella (England)
Player of the Match: Penioni Tagituimua (Fiji)

Team details
Fiji		Position	Italy
Name	Number	Position	Number	Name
Sunia Turuva	1	Fullback	1	Luke Polselli
Vuate Karawalevu	24	Wing	2	Richard Lepori
Kevin Naiqama	4	Centre	4	Ethan Natoli
Semi Valemei	19	Centre	3	Daniel Atkinson
Maika Sivo	2	Wing	5	Jake Maizen
Apisai Koroisau	9	Stand off/Five eighth	6	Jack Campagnolo
Brandon Wakeham	7	Scrum half/Half back	7	Radean Robinson
King Vuniyayawa	17	Prop forward	8	Alec Susino
Penioni Tagituimua	14	Hooker	9	Dean Parata
Tui Kamikamica	13	Prop forward	10	Anton Iaria
Siua Wong	22	Second row	11	Ryan King
Viliame Kikau	12	Second row	12	Brenden Santi
Korbin Sims	3	Loose forward/Lock forward	13	Nathan Brown
Lamar Manuel-Liolevave	16	Interchange	14	Joe Tramontana
Ben Nakubuwai	10	Interchange	15	Luca Moretti
Taniela Sadrugu	11	Interchange	20	Jack Colovatti
Henry Raiwalui	20	Interchange	19	Luke Hodge
Rugby League Project

22 October 2022
17:00 BST (UTC+01:00)

England	42–18	France
Tries: Hall (2) 6', 12'; Thompson 24'; Whitehead 45'; Radley 50'; Young (2) 57', 66'; Goals: Sneyd (7/7) 8', 13', 26', 46', 51’, 58', 67'	Report	Tries: Mourgue 29'; Pelissier 33'; Romano 76'; Goals: Mourgue (3/3) 30', 33', 77'

University of Bolton Stadium, Bolton
Attendance: 23,648
Referee: Gerard Sutton (Australia)
Touch judges: Liam Moore (England), Todd Smith (Australia)
Player of the Match: George Williams (England)

Team details
England		Position	France
Name	Number	Position	Number	Name
Sam Tomkins	1	Fullback	1	Morgan Escare
Ryan Hall	5	Wing	2	Arthur Romano
Kallum Watkins	3	Centre	3	Samisoni Langi
Herbie Farnworth	4	Centre	4	Matthieu Laguerre
Dom Young	14	Wing	6	Arthur Mourgue
Marc Sneyd	21	Stand off/Five eighth	7	Tony Gigot
George Williams	7	Scrum half/Half back	8	Jordan Dezaria
Tom Burgess (yellow card) 80'	8	Prop forward	9	Alrix Da Costa
Michael McIlorum	9	Hooker	10	Lambert Belmas
Chris Hill	18	Prop forward	11	Benjamin Jullien
Elliot Whitehead	11	Second row	12	Paul Séguier
John Bateman	12	Second row	13	Benjamin Garcia
Victor Radley	13	Loose forward/Lock forward	17	Mickael Goudemand
Jack Welsby	6	Interchange	14	Eloi Pelissier
Luke Thompson	10	Interchange	15	Justin Sangare
Andy Ackers	19	Interchange	16	Gadwin Springer
Mikolaj Oledzki	23	Interchange	19	Corentin Le Cam
Shaun Wane		Coach
Rugby League Project

22 October 2022
19:30 BST (UTC+01:00)

New Zealand	68–6	Jamaica
Tries: Watene-Zelezniak (4) 4', 14', 19', 59'; Hiku 9'; Niukore 29'; Kris 37'; Marshall-King (2) 40', 55'; Nicoll-Klokstad 44'; Nikora 53'; Smith (2) 66', 72'; Goals: Foran (6/10) 16', 31', 40', 61', 67', 73'; Watene-Zelezniak (2/3) 45', 54'	Report	Tries: Jones-Bishop 76'; Goals: Rush (1/1) 78'

MKM Stadium, Hull
Attendance: 6,829
Referee: Marcus Griffiths (England)
Touch judges: Belinda Sharpe (Australia), Aaron Moore (England)
Player of the Match: Dallin Watene-Zelezniak (New Zealand)

Team details
New Zealand		Position	Jamaica
Name	Number	Position	Number	Name
	1	Fullback	1
	2	Wing	2
	3	Centre	3
	4	Centre	4
	5	Wing	5
	6	Stand off	6
	7	Scrum half	7
	8	Prop forward	8
	9	Hooker	9
	10	Prop forward	10
	11	Second row	11
	12	Second row	12
	13	Loose forward	13
		Interchange
		Interchange
		Interchange
		Interchange
Rugby League Project

23 October 2022
14:30 BST (UTC+01:00)

Lebanon	32–14	Ireland
Tries: Robinson 21'; Kiraz 25'; Morkos 31'; El-Zakhem 54'; Miski 58'; Goals: Moses (6/7) 17' pen, 22' 26', 33', 56', 71' pen	Report	Tries: L. Senior (2) 38', 48'; Chamberlain 78'; Goals: Chamberlain (1/3) 50'

Leigh Sports Village, Leigh
Attendance: 6,057
Referee: Adam Gee (Australia)
Touch judges: Tom Grant (England), Warren Turley (Australia)
Player of the Match: Mitchell Moses (Lebanon)

Team details
Lebanon		Position	Ireland
Name	Number	Position	Number	Name
Jacob Kiraz	1	Fullback	1	Richie Myler
Josh Mansour	2	Wing	3	Ed Chamberlain
Brandon Morkos	4	Centre	4	Toby King
Abbas Miski	5	Centre	5	Innes Senior
Mitchell Moses	7	Wing	6	Luke Keary
Kayne Kalache	8	Stand off/Five eighth	7	Joe Keyes
Elie El-Zakhem	11	Scrum half/Half back	8	Liam Byrne (yellow card) 70'
Charbel Tasipale	12	Prop forward	10	Jaimin Jolliffe
James Roumanos	13	Hooker	11	James Bentley
Andrew Kazzi	15	Prop forward	12	Frankie Halton
Reece Robinson	16	Second row	13	George King
Khaled Rajab	18	Second row	16	Brendan O'Hagan
Khalil Rahme	19	Loose forward/Lock forward	20	Louis Senior
Bilal Maarbani	3	Interchange	9	Josh Cook
Anthony Layoun	14	Interchange	15	Harry Rushton
Jalal Bazzaz (yellow card) 40'	17	Interchange	19	Robbie Mulhern (yellow card) 40'
Jaxson Rahme	20	Interchange	22	James Hasson
Michael Cheika		Coach		Ged Corcoran
Rugby League Project

23 October 2022
17:00 BST (UTC+01:00)

Samoa	72–4	Greece
Tries: To'o 1'; Paulo 5'; Levi 16', 70'; Harris-Tavita 22', 60'; Hunt 30'; Luai 33'; Lafai (2) 37', 80'; Brown 53'; Crichton 56'; Feagai 64'; Goals: Crichton (10/13) 3', 5', 17', 23', 31', 34', 38', 54', 61', 71'	Report	Tries: Ilias 49'; Goals: Ilias (0/1)

Eco-Power Stadium, Doncaster
Attendance: 4,415
Referee: James Child (England)
Touch judges: Liam Rush (England), Robert Hicks (England)
Player of the Match: Jarome Luai (Samoa)

Team details
Samoa		Position	Greece
Name	Number	Position	Number	Name
Joseph Suaalii	1	Fullback	1	Chaise Robinson
Brian To'o	5	Wing	2	Siteni Taukamo
Stephen Crichton	4	Centre	3	Terence Constantinou
Tim Lafai	25	Centre	4	Nicholas Mougios
Mat Feagai	19	Wing	5	John Mitsias
Jarome Luai	6	Stand off/Five eighth	13	Billy Magoulias
Chanel Harris-Tavita	20	Scrum half/Half back	6	Lachlan Ilias
Josh Papali'i	8	Prop forward	12	Nicholas Flocas
Danny Levi	9	Hooker	9	Peter Mamouzelos
Junior Paulo	10	Prop forward	10	Stefanos Bastas
Ligi Sao	11	Second row	14	Jake Kambos
Jaydn Su'a	12	Second row	25	Adam Vrahnos
Josh Aloiai	13	Loose forward/Lock forward	16	Sebastian Sell
Fa'amanu Brown	21	Interchange	15	Myles Gal
Royce Hunt	15	Interchange	17	Theodoros Nianiakas
Oregon Kaufusi	23	Interchange	19	Liam Sue-Tin
Martin Taupau	17	Interchange	23	Nikolaos Bosmos
Rugby League Project

24 October 2022
19:30 BST (UTC+01:00)

Tonga	32–6	Wales
Tries: Tupou (3) 21', 51', 71'; Fifita 37'; Koloamatangi 40'; Niu 47'; Goals: Lolohea (3/5) 38', 40', 49'; Talakai (1/1) 72'	Report	Tries: Evans 17'; Goals: Fozard (1/1) 18'

Totally Wicked Stadium, St Helens
Attendance: 7,752
Referee: Kasey Badger (Australia)
Touch judges: Mike Smaill (England), Rochelle Tamarua (New Zealand)
Player of the Match: Daniel Tupou (Tonga)

Team details
Tonga		Position	Wales
Name	Number	Position	Number	Name
	1	Fullback	1
	2	Wing	2
	3	Centre	3
	4	Centre	4
	5	Wing	5
	6	Stand off/Five eighth	6
	7	Scrum half/Half back	7
	8	Prop forward	8
	9	Hooker	9
	10	Prop forward	10
	11	Second row	11
	12	Second row	12
	13	Loose forward/Lock forward	13
		Interchange
		Interchange
		Interchange
		Interchange
Rugby League Project

25 October 2022
19:30 BST (UTC+01:00)

Papua New Guinea	32–16	Cook Islands
Tries: Tai (2) 14', 46'; Laybutt 23'; Martin 41'; Lam 56'; Olam 68'; Goals: Martin (4/6) 24', 42', 57', 69'	Report	Tries: Ulberg 34'; Gelling 60'; Iro 77'; Goals: S. Marsters (2/3) 3' pen, 35'; Takairangi (0/1)

Halliwell Jones Stadium, Warrington
Attendance: 6,273
Referee: Chris Kendall (England)
Touch judges: Wyatt Raymond (Australia), Paki Parkinson (New Zealand)
Player of the Match: Rhyse Martin (Papua New Guinea)

Team details
Papua New Guinea		Position	Cook Islands
Name	Number	Position	Number	Name
Alex Johnston	1	Fullback	1	Kayal Iro
Rodrick Tai	20	Wing	5	Steven Marsters
Nene Macdonald	3	Centre	3	Anthony Gelling
Justin Olam	4	Centre	16	Reubenn Rennie
Jimmy Ngutlik	19	Wing	2	Paul Ulberg
Kyle Laybutt	6	Stand off/Five eighth	6	Brad Takairangi
Lam	7	Scrum half/Half back	4	Esan Marsters
Wellington Albert	8	Prop forward	21	Vincent Rennie
Edwin Ipape	9	Hooker	9	Aaron Teroi
Sylvester Namo	10	Prop forward	10	Tepai Moeroa
Nixon Putt	11	Second row	11	Dominique Peyroux
Rhyse Martin	12	Second row	12	Brendan Piakura
Jacob Alick	13	Loose forward/Lock forward	13	Zane Tetevano
Watson Boas	23	Interchange	8	Makahesi Makatoa
Dan Russell	15	Interchange	20	Davvy Moale
McKenzie Yei	16	Interchange	17	Rua Ngatikaura
Keven Appo	18	Interchange	18	Moses Noovao-McGreal
Jeremiah Simbiken	22	Reserve	14	Tevin Arona
Rugby League Project

28 October 2022
19:30 BST (UTC+01:00)

New Zealand	48–10	Ireland
Tries: Hughes (2) 15', 60'; Rapana (2) 20', 46'; Hiku (2) 26', 33'; Mulitalo 38'; Fisher-Harris 55'; K. Bromwich 63'; Manu 79'; Goals: Rapana (2/4) 17', 27'; Brown (2/6) 61', 64'	Report	Tries: L. Senior (2) 29', 66'; Goals: Chamberlain (1/3) 12' pen

Headingley Rugby Stadium, Leeds
Attendance: 14,044
Referee: Robert Hicks (England)
Touch judges: James Vella (England), Darian Furner (Australia)
Player of the Match: Jahrome Hughes (New Zealand)

Team details
New Zealand		Position	Ireland
Name	Number	Position	Number	Name
Joseph Manu	1	Fullback	1	Richie Myler
Jordan Rapana	5	Wing	20	Louis Senior
Peta Hiku	4	Centre	3	Ed Chamberlain
Briton Nikora	17	Centre	4	Toby King
Ronaldo Mulitalo	2	Wing	5	Innes Senior
Dylan Brown	6	Stand off/Five eighth	6	Luke Keary
Jahrome Hughes	7	Scrum half/Half back	7	Joe Keyes
Jesse Bromwich	8	Prop forward	22	James Hasson
Brandon Smith	9	Hooker	9	Joshua Cook
James Fisher-Harris	10	Prop forward	13	George King
Kenny Bromwich	12	Second row	11	James Bentley
Nelson Asofa-Solomona	16	Second row	12	Frankie Halton
Joseph Tapine	13	Loose forward/Lock forward	21	Ronan Michael
Isaiah Papali'i	11	Interchange	16	Brendan O'Hagan
Kieran Foran	14	Interchange	15	Harry Rushton
Jared Waerea-Hargreaves	18	Interchange	17	Dan Norman
Isaac Liu	20	Interchange	18	Henry O'Kane
Michael Maguire		Coach		Ged Corcoran
Rugby League Project

29 October 2022
14:30 BST (UTC+01:00)

England	94–4	Greece
Tries: Lees 3'; Young (4) 13', 25', 35', 37'; Hall (2) 28', 59'; Burgess (2) 33', 53'; Williams 40'; Makinson 43'; Sneyd 49'; Batchelor 63'; Ackers (2) 67', 75'; Pearce-Paul 73'; McMeeken 77'; Goals: Sneyd (13/17) 4', 27', 34', 36', 39', 40', 43', 50', 55', 60', 68', 76', 77'	Report	Tries: Taukamo 18'; Goals: Ilias (0/1)

Bramall Lane, Sheffield
Attendance: 18,760
Referee: Belinda Sharpe (Australia)
Touch judges: Marcus Griffiths (England), Wyatt Raymond (Australia)
Player of the Match: Marc Sneyd (England)

Team details
England		Position	Greece
Name	Number	Position	Number	Name
Tommy Makinson	2	Fullback	2	Siteni Taukamo
Ryan Hall	5	Wing	4	Nick Mougios
Jack Welsby	6	Centre	3	Terry Constantinou
Kai Pearce-Paul	24	Centre	25	Adam Vrahnos
Dom Young	14	Wing	5	John Mitsias
Marc Sneyd	21	Stand off/Five eighth	6	Lachlan Ilias
George Williams	7	Scrum half/Half back	7	Jordan Meads
Matty Lees	16	Prop forward	8	Rob Tuliatu
Andy Ackers	19	Hooker	9	Peter Mamouzelos
Mike Cooper	17	Prop forward	22	Ioannis Rousoglou
John Bateman	12	Second row	11	Mitchell Zampetides
Joe Batchelor	22	Second row	14	Jake Kambos
Victor Radley	13	Loose forward/Lock forward	12	Nick Flocas
Burgess	8	Interchange	16	Sebastian Sell
Morgan Knowles	15	Interchange	17	Theodoros Nianiakas
Chris Hill	18	Interchange	20	Ioannis Nake
Mike McMeeken	20	Interchange	21	Konstantinos Katsidonis
Shaun Wane		Coach
Rugby League Project

29 October 2022
17:00 BST (UTC+01:00)

Fiji	30–14	Scotland
Tries: Sadrugu 6'; Kikau 15'; Raiwalui 36'; Sivo 46'; Sims 67'; Goals: Wakeham (5/5) 7', 16', 37', 48', 68'	Report	Tries: Walmsley 21'; Hellewell 40'; Liu 51'; Goals: Schneider (1/3) 63'

Kingston Park, Newcastle
Attendance: 6,736
Referee: Tom Grant (England)
Touch judges: James Child (England), Chris Kendall (England)
Player of the Match: Sunia Turuva (Fiji)

Team details
Fiji		Position	Scotland
Name	Number	Position	Number	Name
Sunia Turuva	1	Fullback	1	Davey Dixon
Vuate Karawalevu	2	Wing	2	Lachlan Walmsley
Kevin Naiqama	3	Centre	3	Bayley Liu
Semi Valemei	4	Centre	4	Kieran Buchanan
Maika Sivo	5	Wing	5	Matty Russell
Henry Raiwalui	6	Stand off/Five eighth	6	James Bell
Brandon Wakeham	7	Scrum half/Half back	7	Calum Gahan
King Vuniyayawa	8	Prop forward	8	Jack Teanby
Apisai Koroisau	9	Hooker	9	Kyle Schneider
Korbin Sims	10	Prop forward	10	Sam Luckley
Viliame Kikau	11	Second row	11	Ben Hellewell
Siua Wong	12	Second row	12	Kane Linnett
Taniela Sadrugu	13	Loose forward/Lock forward	13	Luke Bain
Penioni Tagituimua	14	Interchange	14	Logan Bayliss-Brow
Tevita Toloi	15	Interchange	15	Guy Graham
Joseph Ratuvakacereivalu	16	Interchange	16	Dale Ferguson
Lamar Manuel-Liolevave	17	Interchange	17	Charlie Emslie
Netane Masima	18	Reserve	18	Shane Toal
Rugby League Project

29 October 2022
19:30 BST (UTC+01:00)

Australia	66–6	Italy
Tries: Holmes 7'; Taulagi (2) 14', 40'; Tedesco 19'; Graham (2) 28', 68'; Mitchell 36'; Yeo 46'; Martin 51'; Murray 58'; Nanai 74'; Collins 80'; Goals: Cleary (9/12) 20', 30', 38', 48', 52', 60', 69', 76', 80'	Report	Tries: Palumbo 54'; Goals: Campagnolo (1/1) 55'

Totally Wicked Stadium, St Helens
Attendance: 5,586
Referee: Liam Moore (England)
Touch judges: Michael Smaill (England), Jack Smith (England)
Player of the Match: Jeremiah Nanai (Australia)

Team details
Australia		Position	Italy
Name	Number	Position	Number	Name
James Tedesco	1	Fullback	1	Luke Polselli
Campbell Graham	18	Wing	18	Kyle Pickering
Valentine Holmes	4	Centre	3	Daniel Atkinson
Latrell Mitchell	8	Centre	4	Ethan Natoli
Murray Taulagi	23	Wing	5	Jake Maizen
Daly Cherry-Evans	2	Stand off/Five eighth	6	Jack Campagnolo
Nathan Cleary	14	Scrum half/Half back	7	Radean Robinson
Lindsay Collins	15	Prop forward	8	Alec Susino
Ben Hunt	3	Hooker	9	Dean Parata
Reuben Cotter	16	Prop forward	10	Anton Iaria
Liam Martin	21	Second row	15	Luca Moretti
Jeremiah Nanai	22	Second row	12	Brenden Santi
Cameron Murray	11	Loose forward/Lock forward	13	Nathan Brown
Isaah Yeo	24	Interchange	14	Joe Tramontana
Tino Fa'asuamaleaui	18	Interchange	17	Ronny Palumbo
Reagan Campbell-Gillard	6	Interchange	20	Jack Colovatti
Matt Burton	12	Interchange	16	Gioele Celerino
Mal Meninga		Coach		Leo Epifania
Rugby League Project

30 October 2022
12:00 GMT (UTC±00:00)

Lebanon	74–12	Jamaica
Tries: Tannous 6'; Miski 9'; El-Zakhem 12'; Robinson 15'; Rajab 23'; Tasipale (2) 27', 55'; Mansour (2) 32', 62'; Doueihi 45'; Maroun 59'; Goals: Moses (7/7) 8', 11', 13', 16', 24', 28', 33'; Doueihi (2/4) 57', 60'	Report	Tries: Agoro 50'; Andrade 66'; Goals: Woodburn-Hall (1/1) 51'; Rush (1/1) 66'

Leigh Sports Village, Leigh
Attendance: 5,006
Referee: Paki Parkinson (New Zealand)
Touch judges: Grant Atkins (Australia), Darian Furner (Australia)
Player of the Match: Adam Doueihi (Lebanon)

Team details
Lebanon		Position	Jamaica
Name	Number	Position	Number	Name
Adam Doueihi	6	Fullback	1	Ben Jones-Bishop
Josh Mansour	2	Wing	2	Mo Agoro
Brad Morkos	4	Centre	5	Alex Young
Reece Robinson	16	Centre	4	Jacob Ogden
Abbas Miski	5	Wing	18	Abevia McDonald
Khaled Rajab	18	Stand off/Five eighth	6	James Woodburn-Hall
Mitchell Moses	7	Scrum half/Half back	7	Kieran Rush
James Roumanos	13	Prop forward	8	Khamisi McCain
Michael Tannous	9	Hooker	9	Jy-mel Coleman
Khalil Rahme	19	Prop forward	10	Michael Lawrence
Elie El-Zakhem	11	Second row	16	Keenen Tomlinson
Charbel Tasipale	12	Second row	12	Joel Farrell
Andrew Kazzi	15	Loose forward/Lock forward	13	Ashton Golding
Anthony Layoun	14	Interchange	3	Joe Brown
Jalal Bazzaz	17	Interchange	11	AJ Wallace
Jaxson Rahme	20	Interchange	22	Chevaughn Bailey
Tony Maroun	22	Interchange	15	Jordan Andrade
Bilal Maarbani	3	Reserve	20	Greg Johnson
Rugby League Project

30 October 2022
14:30 GMT (UTC±00:00)

Tonga	92–10	Cook Islands
Tries: Tupou (2) 1', 64'; Taumalolo (2) 13', 20'; Niu (3) 22', 29', 49'; Penisini (4) 26', 32' (pen), 61', 74'; Lolohea (2) 35', 58'; Kaufusi 40'; I. Katoa 44'; Amone 78'; Goals: I. Katoa (14/16) 15', 21', 24', 28', 31', 33', 37', 40', 46', 51', 62', 66', 76', 79'	Report	Tries: S. Marsters 69'; Ti. Arona 80'; Goals: S. Marsters (0/1); Ti. Arona (1/1) 80'

Riverside Stadium, Middlesbrough
Attendance: 8,342
Referee: Ashley Klein (Australia)
Touch judges: Kasey Badger (Australia), Aaron Moore (England)
Player of the Match: Jason Taumalolo (Tonga)

Team details
Tonga		Position	Cook Islands
Name	Number	Position	Number	Name
Tesi Niu	22	Fullback	1	Kayal Iro
Daniel Tupou	2	Wing	5	Steven Marsters
Mosese Suli	19	Centre	4	Esan Marsters
Will Penisini	4	Centre	22	Geoff Daniela
Sione Katoa	5	Wing	2	Paul Ulberg
Isaiya Katoa	24	Stand off/Five eighth	6	Brad Takairangi
Tuimoala Lolohea	7	Scrum half/Half back	7	Johnathon Ford
Addin Fonua-Blake	8	Prop forward	8	Makahesi Makatoa
Soni Luke	14	Hooker	9	Aaron Teroi
Moeaki Fotuaika	17	Prop forward	10	Tepai Moeroa
Felise Kaufusi	11	Second row	11	Dominique Peyroux
Keaon Koloamatangi	12	Second row	12	Brendan Piakura
Jason Taumalolo	13	Loose forward/Lock forward	13	Zane Tetevano
Talatau Amone	6	Interchange	14	Tevin Arona
Tevita Tatola	16	Interchange	15	Tinirau Arona
David Fifita	18	Interchange	20	Davvy Moale
Ben Murdoch-Masila	21	Interchange	24	Dylan Napa
Konrad Hurrell	23	Reserve	19	Pride Petterson-Robati
Rugby League Project

30 October 2022
17:00 GMT (UTC±00:00)

Samoa	62–4	France
Tries: Lafai (2) 4', 66'; To'o (2) 17', 47'; Ta. May (4) 21', 34', 40', 44'; Milford (2) 62', 74'; Harris-Tavita 69'; Goals: Crichton (9/11) 5', 22', 36', 40', 45', 48', 64', 70', 75'	Report	Tries: Yaha 53'; Goals: Mourgue (0/1)

Halliwell Jones Stadium, Warrington
Attendance: 6,756
Referee: Todd Smith (Australia)
Touch judges: Liam Rush (England), Warren Turley (England)

Team details
Samoa		Position	France
Name	Number	Position	Number	Name
	1	Fullback	1
	2	Wing	2
	3	Centre	3
	4	Centre	4
	5	Wing	5
	6	Stand off/Five eighth	6
	7	Scrum half/Half back	7
	8	Prop forward	8
	9	Hooker	9
	10	Prop forward	10
	11	Second row	11
	12	Second row	12
	13	Loose forward/Lock forward	13
		Interchange
		Interchange
		Interchange
		Interchange
Rugby League Project

31 October 2022
19:30 GMT (UTC±00:00)

Papua New Guinea	36–0	Wales
Tries: Laybutt 6'; Putt (2) 12', 46'; Ngutlik (2) 18', 76'; Russell 23'; Goals: Martin (6/6) 6', 12', 18', 23', 46', 77'	Report

Eco-Power Stadium, Doncaster
Attendance: 6,968
Referee: Gerard Sutton (Australia)
Touch judges: Belinda Sharpe (Australia), James Child (England)
Player of the Match: Nixon Putt (Papua New Guinea)

Team details
Papua New Guinea		Position	Wales
Name	Number	Position	Number	Name
Alex Johnston	1	Fullback	1	Caleb Aekins
Rodrick Tai	20	Wing	2	Kyle Evans
Nene Macdonald	3	Centre	3	Will Evans
Justin Olam	4	Centre	4	Elliot Kear
Jimmy Ngutlik	19	Wing	5	Rhys Williams
Kyle Laybutt	6	Stand off/Five eighth	6	Ollie Olds
Lachlan Lam	7	Scrum half/Half back	7	Josh Ralph
Wellington Albert	8	Prop forward	8	Anthony Walker
Edwin Ipape	9	Hooker	9	Matty Fozard
Emmanuel Waine	17	Prop forward	24	Gavin Bennion
Nixon Putt	11	Second row	11	Rhodri Lloyd
Rhyse Martin	12	Second row	17	Bailey Antrobus
Jacob Alick	13	Loose forward/Lock forward	16	Joe Burke
Wesser Tenza	14	Interchange	10	Dan Fleming
Dan Russell	15	Interchange	12	Chester Butler
Sherwin Tanabi	21	Interchange	15	Curtis Davies
Jeremiah Simbiken	22	Interchange	18	Connor Davies
Zev John	24	Reserve	19	Mike Butt
Stanley Tepend		Coach		John Kear
Rugby League Project

==== Knockout stage ====
4 November 2022
19:30 GMT (UTC±00:00)

Australia	48–4	Lebanon
Tries: Addo-Carr (5) 5', 16', 19', 45', 59'; Mitchell 24'; Murray (2) 30', 33'; Martin 69'; Goals: Cleary (6/9) 17', 31', 34', 46', 60', 70'	Report	Tries: Mansour 52'; Goals: Moses (0/1)

John Smith's Stadium, Huddersfield
Attendance: 8,206
Referee: Chris Kendall (England)
Touch judges: Wyatt Raymond (Australia), Warren Turley (England)
Player of the Match: Josh Addo-Carr (Australia)

Team details
Australia		Position	Lebanon
Name	Number	Position	Number	Name
James Tedesco	1	Fullback	1	Jacob Kiraz
Valentine Holmes	4	Wing	2	Josh Mansour
Jack Wighton	10	Centre	4	Brad Morkos
Latrell Mitchell	8	Centre	16	Reece Robinson
Josh Addo-Carr	9	Wing	5	Abbas Miski
Cameron Munster	7	Stand off/Five eighth	6	Adam Doueihi
Nathan Cleary	14	Scrum half/Half back	7	Mitchell Moses
Jake Trbojevic	5	Prop forward	13	James Roumanos
Harry Grant	20	Hooker	14	Anthony Layoun
Tino Fa'asuamaleaui	18	Prop forward	19	Khalil Rahme
Angus Crichton	17	Second row	11	Elie El-Zakhem
Liam Martin	21	Second row	12	Charbel Tasipale
Isaah Yeo	24	Loose forward/Lock forward	15	Andrew Kazzi
Daly Cherry-Evans	2	Interchange	9	Michael Tannous
Patrick Carrigan	13	Interchange	18	Khaled Rajab
Cameron Murray	11	Interchange	17	Jalal Bazzaz
Lindsay Collins	15	Interchange	20	Jaxson Rahme
Mal Meninga		Coach		Michael Cheika
Rugby League Project

5 November 2022
14:30 GMT (UTC±00:00)

England	46–6	Papua New Guinea
Tries: Burgess 6'; Makinson (5) 9', 18', 27', 58', 75'; Young 14'; Williams 21'; Watkins 24'; Goals: Makinson (5/9) 7', 20', 22', 26, 28'	Report	Tries: Ngutlik 70'; Goals: Martin (1/1) 71'

DW Stadium, Wigan
Attendance: 23,179
Referee: Liam Moore (England)
Touch judges: Darian Furner (Australia), Jack Smith (England)
Player of the Match: Tommy Makinson (England)

Team details
England		Position	Papua New Guinea
Name	Number	Position	Number	Name
Sam Tomkins	1	Fullback	1	Alex Johnston
Dom Young	14	Wing	20	Rodrick Tai
Kallum Watkins	3	Centre	3	Nene Macdonald
Herbie Farnworth	4	Centre	4	Justin Olam
Tommy Makinson	2	Wing	19	Jimmy Ngutlik
Jack Welsby	6	Stand off/Five eighth	6	Kyle Laybutt
George Williams	7	Scrum half/Half back	7	Lachlan Lam
Tom Burgess	8	Prop forward	8	Wellington Albert
Michael McIlorum	9	Hooker	9	Edwin Ipape
Chris Hill	18	Prop forward	10	Sylvester Namo
Elliott Whitehead	11	Second row	11	Nixon Putt
John Bateman	12	Second row	12	Rhyse Martin
Victor Radley	13	Loose forward/Lock forward	13	Jacob Alick
Morgan Knowles	15	Interchange	23	Watson Boas
Matty Lees	16	Interchange	15	Dan Russell
Mike Cooper	17	Interchange	16	McKenzie Yei
Mike McMeeken	20	Interchange	22	Jeremiah Simbiken
Shaun Wane		Coach		Stanley Tepend
Rugby League Project

5 November 2022
19:30 GMT (UTC±00:00)

New Zealand	24–18	Fiji
Tries: Mulitalo 25'; Nikora 48'; Manu 62'; Rapana 78'; Goals: Rapana (4/5) 27', 49', 64', 71' pen	Report	Tries: Sivo 11'; Naiqama (2) 17', 43'; Goals: Wakeham (3/3) 12', 19', 44'

MKM Stadium, Hull
Attendance: 7,080
Referee: Gerard Sutton (Australia)
Touch judges: Belinda Sharpe (Australia), Marcus Griffiths (England)
Player of the Match: Joseph Manu (New Zealand)

Team details
New Zealand		Position	Fiji
Name	Number	Position	Number	Name
Joseph Manu	1	Fullback	1	Sunia Turuva
Jordan Rapana	5	Wing	24	Vuate Karawalevu
Peta Hiku	4	Centre	4	Kevin Naiqama
Charnze Nicoll-Klokstad	21	Centre	19	Semi Valemei
Ronaldo Mulitalo	2	Wing	2	Maika Sivo
Dylan Brown	6	Stand off/Five eighth	9	Apisai Koroisau
Jahrome Hughes	7	Scrum half/Half back	7	Brandon Wakeham
Jesse Bromwich	8	Prop forward	3	Korbin Sims
Brandon Smith	9	Hooker	14	Penioni Tagituimua
James Fisher-Harris	10	Prop forward	13	Tui Kamikamica
Kenneath Bromwich	12	Second row	22	Siua Wong
Nelson Asofa-Solomona	16	Second row	12	Viliame Kikau
Joseph Tapine	13	Loose forward/Lock forward	11	Taniela Sadrugu
Isaiah Papali'i	11	Interchange	20	Henry Raiwalui
Kieran Foran	14	Interchange	16	Lamar Manuel-Liolevave
Briton Nikora	17	Interchange	10	Ben Nakubuwai
Isaac Liu	20	Interchange	17	King Vuniyayawa
Michael Maguire		Coach		Wise Kativerata
Rugby League Project

6 November 2022
14:30 GMT (UTC±00:00)

Tonga	18–20	Samoa
Tries: Tupou 7'; Taukeiaho 32'; S. Katoa 70'; Goals: I. Katoa (3/4) 33', 49' pen, 71'	Report	Tries: Su'a 4'; Luai 16'; To'o 58'; Goals: Crichton (4/4) 5', 18', 56' pen, 59'

Halliwell Jones Stadium, Warrington
Attendance: 12,674
Referee: Ashley Klein (Australia)
Touch judges: Robert Hicks (England), Kasey Badger (Australia)
Player of the Match: Anthony Milford (Samoa)

Team details
Tonga		Position	Samoa
Name	Number	Position	Number	Name
Will Hopoate	1	Fullback	1	Joseph Sua'ali'i
Daniel Tupou	2	Wing	5	Brian To'o
Mosese Suli	19	Centre	4	Stephen Crichton
Will Penisini	4	Centre	25	Tim Lafai
Sione Katoa	5	Wing	2	Taylan May
Isaiya Katoa	24	Stand off/Five eighth	6	Jarome Luai
Tuimoala Lolohea	7	Scrum half/Half back	7	Anthony Milford
Addin Fonua-Blake	8	Prop forward	15	Royce Hunt
Siliva Havili	9	Hooker	9	Danny Levi
Moeaki Fotuaika	17	Prop forward	10	Junior Paulo
Felise Kaufusi	11	Second row	11	Ligi Sao
Keaon Koloamatangi	12	Second row	12	Jaydn Su'a
Jason Taumalolo	13	Loose forward/Lock forward	23	Oregon Kaufusi
Soni Luke	14	Interchange	20	Chanel Harris-Tavita
Siosiua Taukeiaho	10	Interchange	8	Josh Papali'i
David Fifita	18	Interchange	22	Kelma Tuilagi
Ben Murdoch-Masila	21	Interchange	17	Martin Taupau
Kristian Woolf		Coach		Matt Parish
Rugby League Project

11 November 2022
19:45 GMT (UTC±00:00)

Australia	16–14	New Zealand
Tries: Addo-Carr 16'; Holmes 30'; Murray 53'; Goals: Cleary (2/3) 18', 55'	Report	Tries: Hughes 11'; Brown 37'; Goals: Rapana (3/3) 13', 26' pen, 39'

Elland Road, Leeds
Attendance: 28,113
Referee: Ashley Klein (Australia)
Touch judges: Warren Turley (England), Wyatt Raymond (Australia)
Player of the Match: Liam Martin (Australia)

Team details
Australia		Position	New Zealand
Name	Number	Position	Number	Name
James Tedesco (c)	1	Fullback	1	Joseph Manu
Valentine Holmes	4	Wing	2	Ronaldo Mulitalo
Latrell Mitchell	8	Centre	4	Peta Hiku
Jack Wighton	10	Centre	21	Charnze Nicoll-Klokstad
Josh Addo-Carr	9	Wing	5	Jordan Rapana
Cameron Munster	7	Stand off/Five eighth	6	Dylan Brown
Nathan Cleary	14	Scrum half/Half back	7	Jahrome Hughes
Jake Trbojevic	5	Prop forward	8	Jesse Bromwich (c)
Ben Hunt	3	Hooker	9	Brandon Smith
Regan Campbell-Gillard	6	Prop forward	10	James Fisher-Harris
Angus Crichton	17	Second row	11	Isaiah Papali'i
Liam Martin	21	Second row	17	Briton Nikora
Isaah Yeo	24	Loose forward/Lock forward	13	Joseph Tapine
Harry Grant	20	Interchange	14	Kieran Foran
Patrick Carrigan	13	Interchange	15	Moses Leota
Cameron Murray	11	Interchange	16	Nelson Asofa-Solomona
Tino Fa'asuamaleaui	18	Interchange	20	Isaac Liu
Mal Meninga		Coach		Michael Maguire
Rugby League Project

12 November 2022
14:30 GMT (UTC±00:00)

England	26–27 (g.p.)	Samoa
Tries: Whitehead 24'; Bateman 44'; Farnworth (2) 63', 77'; Goals: Makinson (5/5) 25', 45', 63', 67' pen, 78'	Report	Tries: Lafai 6'; Sao (2) 30', 56'; Crichton (2) 48', 72'; Goals: Crichton (3/5) 32', 49', 74'; Drop goals: Milford (0/1); Crichton (1/1) 83'; Sin bin: Paulo (yellow card) 12' to 22'

Emirates Stadium, London
Attendance: 40,489
Referee: Gerard Sutton (Australia)
Touch judges: Darian Furner (Australia), Jack Smith (England)
Player of the Match: Jarome Luai (Samoa)

Team details
England		Position	Samoa
Name	Number	Position	Number	Name
Sam Tomkins	1	Fullback	1	Joseph Suaalii
Dom Young	14	Wing	5	Brian To'o
Kallum Watkins	3	Centre	4	Stephen Crichton
Herbie Farnworth	4	Centre	25	Tim Lafai
Tommy Makinson	2	Wing	2	Taylan May
Jack Welsby	6	Stand off/Five eighth	6	Jarome Luai
George Williams	7	Scrum half/Half back	7	Anthony Milford
Tom Burgess	8	Prop forward	15	Royce Hunt
Michael McIlorum	9	Hooker	21	Fa'amanu Brown
Chris Hill	18	Prop forward	10	Junior Paulo
Elliot Whitehead	11	Second row	11	Ligi Sao
John Bateman	12	Second row	12	Jaydn Su'a
Victor Radley	13	Loose forward/Lock forward	23	Oregon Kaufusi
Mike McMeeken	20	Interchange	20	Chanel Harris-Tavita
Morgan Knowles	15	Interchange	8	Josh Papalii
Luke Thompson	10	Interchange	16	Spencer Leniu
Mike Cooper	17	Interchange	22	Kelma Tuilagi
Shaun Wane		Coach		Matt Parish
Rugby League Project

19 November 2022
16:00 GMT (UTC±00:00)

Australia	30–10	Samoa
Tries: Mitchell (2) 14', 80'; Tedesco (2) 18', 69'; Martin 30'; Murray 53'; Goals: Cleary (3/5) 19', 55', 70'; Addo-Carr (0/1)	Report	Tries: To'o 61'; Crichton 71'; Goals: Crichton (1/2) 63'

Old Trafford, Manchester
Attendance: 67,502
Referee: Ashley Klein (Australia)
Touch judges: Jack Smith (England), Warren Turley (England)
Player of the Match: James Tedesco (Australia)

FB	1	James Tedesco (c)
WG	4	Valentine Holmes
CE	10	Jack Wighton
CE	8	Latrell Mitchell
WG	9	Josh Addo-Carr
FE	7	Cameron Munster
HB	14	Nathan Cleary
PR	5	Jake Trbojevic
HK	3	Ben Hunt
PR	6	Reagan Campbell-Gillard
SR	21	Liam Martin
SR	17	Angus Crichton
LF	24	Isaah Yeo
Interchange:
IN	20	Harry Grant
IN	13	Patrick Carrigan
IN	11	Cameron Murray
IN	18	Tino Fa'asuamaleaui
CS	2	Daly Cherry-Evans
Coach:
(Australia) Mal Meninga

FB	1	Joseph Sua'ali'i
WG	2	Taylan May
CE	25	Tim Lafai
CE	4	Stephen Crichton
WG	5	Brian To'o
FE	6	Jarome Luai
HB	7	Anthony Milford
PR	10	Junior Paulo (c)
HK	20	Chanel Harris-Tavita
PR	15	Royce Hunt
SR	12	Jaydn Su'a
SR	11	Ligi Sao
LF	13	Oregon Kaufusi
Interchange:
IN	22	Kelma Tuilagi
IN	8	Josh Papali'i
IN	16	Spencer Leniu
IN	17	Martin Taupau
CS	26	Ken Sio
Coach:
(Australia) Matt Parish

=== Women's World Cup warm-up games in England ===
- Note: World Cup warm-up games are not designated as SIMs by the Internation Rugby League even if they are between two international sides.

20 October 2022
19:00 BST (UTC+01:00)

York Valkyrie	0–38	Papua New Guinea
	Source	Tries: Alu (2) 9', 35'; Albert (2) 68', 71'; Molowia 5'; Kunjil 39'; Ravu 55'; Gwasamun 79'; Goals: Gwasamun (2) 70', 72'; De La Cruz 10'

York St John University Sports Park, York

25 October 2022
14:00 BST (UTC+01:00)

Ireland	8–6	Canada
	Report (ERL)

Orrell St James Rugby League Club, Wigan
Referee: Elliot Burrow (England)

27 October 2022
14:30 BST (UTC+01:00)

England Knights	14–26	Cook Islands
	Report (ERL)

Weetwood Sports Park, Leeds

27 October 2022
19:30 BST (UTC+01:00)

Brazil	4–16	France
	Report (ERL)

Post Office Road, Featherstone
Referee: Matt Clayton (England)

== November ==
=== Women's World Cup ===
==== Group stage ====
Pos	Team	Pld	W	D	L	PF	PA	PD	Pts	Qualification
1	England	3	3	0	0	168	12	+156	6	Advance to knockout stage
2	Papua New Guinea	3	2	0	1	108	54	+54	4	Advance to knockout stage
3	Canada	3	1	0	2	38	104	−66	2	
4	Brazil	3	0	0	3	20	164	−144	0	

Source: BBC Sport

Pos	Team	Pld	W	D	L	PF	PA	PD	Pts	Qualification
1	Australia	3	3	0	0	176	8	+168	6	Advance to knockout stage
2	New Zealand	3	2	0	1	88	14	+74	4	Advance to knockout stage
3	Cook Islands	3	1	0	2	30	126	−96	2	
4	France	3	0	0	3	18	164	−146	0	

Source: BBC Sport

1 November 2022
14:30 GMT (UTC±00:00)

England	72–4	Brazil
Tries: Beevers 2'; Hill (3) 16', 22', 73'; Field 28'; Hardcastle (3) 37', 49', 67'; Stanley (2) 6', 40'; Goldthorp 44'; Jones 64'; Burke 70'; Wood 80'; Goals: Stanley (8/14) 23', 29', 38', 45', 65', 68', 74', 80'	Report	Tries: Momberg 59'; Goals: Oliveira (0/1)

Headingley Stadium, Leeds
Attendance: 8,621
Referee: Rochelle Tamarua (New Zealand)
Touch judges: Tom Grant (England), Jack Smith (England)
Player of the Match: Courtney Winfield-Hill (England)

Team details
England		Position	Brazil
Name	Number	Position	Number	Name
Fran Goldthorp	3	Fullback	18	Natalia Momberg
Caitlin Beevers	2	Wing	22	Edna Santini
Tara-Jane Stanley	1	Centre	3	Leticia Medeiros
Amy Hardcastle	4	Centre	1	Adriana Felix
Leah Burke	5	Wing	2	Tati Fernandes
Georgia Roche	6	Stand off/Five eighth	6	Giovana Moura
Courtney Winfield-Hill (c)	7	Scrum half/Half back	7	Maria Graf
Shona Hoyle	17	Prop forward	8	Franciny Amaral
Tara Jones	9	Hooker	9	Patricia Bodeman
Olivia Wood	18	Prop forward	15	Franciele Barros
Vicky Molyneux	14	Second row	11	Patricia Oliveira
Emily Rudge	12	Second row	12	Amanda Welter
Jodie Cunningham	13	Loose forward/Lock forward	13	Barbra Leal
Zoe Harris	22	Interchange	14	Giovanna Barth
Hollie Dodd	11	Interchange	10	Paula Casemiro
Grace Field	15	Interchange	16	Brena Prioste
Victoria Whitfield	8	Interchange	17	Ana Loschi De Quadros
Lois Forsell		Coach		Paul Grundy

1 November 2022
17:00 GMT (UTC±00:00)

Papua New Guinea	34–12	Canada
Tries: Long 25'; Molowia (2) 38', 42'; Ravu 47'; Banu 63'; Gwasamun 76'; Butler 78'; Goals: Veivers (2/5) 43', 80'; Malabag (1/2) 64'	Report	Tries: Woods 31'; Pakulis 60'; Goals: Frananda (2/2) 31', 62'

Headingley Stadium, Leeds
Attendance: 8,621
Referee: Geoffrey Poumes (France)
Touch judges: Aaron Moore (England), James Vella (England)
Player of the Match: Martha Molowia (Papua New Guinea)

2 November 2022
17:00 GMT (UTC±00:00)

New Zealand	46–0	France
Tries: Bartlett 24'; Nicholls 29'; Hall 33'; Murdoch-Masila (2) 39', 76'; Vaha'akolo (2) 42', 56'; P. McGregor 50'; Parker 79'; Goals: Nicholls (1/2) 52'; Clark (4/7) 30', 34', 77', 80'	Report

York Community Stadium, York
Attendance: 3,091
Referee: Ben Thaler (England)
Touch judges: Neil Horton (England), Liam Rush (England)
Player of the Match: Apii Nicholls-Pualau (New Zealand)

Team details
New Zealand		Position	France
Name	Number	Position	Number	Name
Apii Nicholls-Pualau	1	Fullback	5	Manon Samarra
Katelyn Vaha'akolo	2	Wing	23	Margot Canal
Shanice Parker	21	Centre	4	Laureane Biville
Page McGregor	4	Centre	19	Zoe Pastre Courtine
Madison Bartlett	5	Wing	2	Cristina Song-Puche
Autumn-Rain Stephens-Daly	3	Stand off/Five eighth	6	Elisa Ciria
Raecene McGregor	7	Scrum half/Half back	7	Alice Varela
Mya Hill-Moana	20	Prop forward	9	Cyndia Mansard
Krystal Rota	9	Hooker	14	Fanny Ramos
Annetta Nu'Uausala	10	Prop forward	10	Gaelle Alvherne
Roxy Murdoch-Masila	11	Second row	1	Elisa Akpa
Amber Hall	12	Second row	12	Perrine Monsterrat
Georgia Hale	13	Loose forward/Lock forward	13	Leila Bessahli
Nita Maynard	14	Interchange	16	Elodie Pacull
Charlotte Scanlan	16	Interchange	17	Mailys Borak
Otesa Pule	18	Interchange	11	Tallis Kuresa
Brianna Clark	23	Interchange	21	Dorine Samarra
Ricky Henry		Coach		Vincent Baloup

2 November 2022
19:30 GMT (UTC±00:00)

Australia	74–0	Cook Islands
Tries: Pelite (3) 3', 25', 70'; Johnston 9'; Aiken (2) 14', 72'; Bremmer (4) 21', 44', 60', 63'; Ciesiolka 30'; Robinson 33', 57'; Fuimaono 54'; Goals: Brown (6/9) 10', 16', 23', 31', 65', 70'; Wheeler (3/3) 55', 58', 61'	Report

York Community Stadium, York
Attendance: 3,091
Referee: Michael Smaill (England)
Touch judges: Warren Turley (England), Wyatt Raymond (Australia)
Player of the Match: Sam Bremner (Australia)

Team details
Australia		Position	Cook Islands
Name	Number	Position	Number	Name
Samantha Bremner (c)	2	Fullback	1	Mackenzie Wiki
Julia Robinson	5	Wing	2	Beniamina Koiatu
Isabelle Kelly	5	Centre	3	Kerehitina Matua
Shenae Ciesiolka	19	Centre	5	Kiana Takairangi,
Evania Pelite	17	Wing	4	Daimzel Rongokea,
Tarryn Aiken	24	Stand off/Five eighth	6	Kimiora Breayley-Nati (c)
Ali Brigginshaw	12	Scrum half/Half back	7	Chantay Kiria-Ratu
Caitlan Johnston	3	Prop forward	8	Karol Tanevesi
Lauren Brown	20	Hooker	9	Tetuanui Dean
Shannon Mato	14	Prop forward	10	April Ngatupuna
Kezie Apps	23	Second row	16	Alekermay Tuaana
Olivia Kernick	1	Second row	17	Lavinia Kitai
Simaima Taufa	4	Loose forward/Lock forward	21	Anneka Stephens
Holli Wheeler	9	Interchange	14	Jazmon Tupou-Witchman
Kennedy Cherrington	16	Interchange	15	Toka Natua
Yasmin Clydsdale	18	Interchange	18	Charlize Tumu-Makara
Taliah Fuimaono	19	Interchange	19	Tehinnah-Leal Tatuava
Brad Donald		Coach		Rusty Matua

5 November 2022
12:00 GMT (UTC±00:00)

England	54–4	Canada
Tries: Burke (2) 4', 67'; Dodd (2) 17', 26'; Wilson 20'; Goldthorp 33'; Roche 35'; Stanley (3) 41', 44', 60'; Roberts 52'; Goals: Stanley (5/11) 21', 27', 36' 42' 61'	Report	Tries: Woods 47'

DW Stadium, Wigan
Attendance: 23,179 (Note: Match was a double header with the men's game between England and Papua New Guinea)
Referee: Paki Parkinson (New Zealand)
Touch judges: James Vella (England), Liam Rush (England)
Player of the Match: Vicky Molyneux (England)

5 November 2022
17:00 GMT (UTC±00:00)

Papua New Guinea	70–0	Brazil
Tries: Gwasamun (4) 2', 27', 51', 59'; Moxon (2) 11', 54'; Butler 16'; Albert 42'; Reeves 45'; Koroi 48'; Joe 66'; Molowia 69'; Malabag 72'; Aiton 75'; Goals: Malabag (7/14) 28', 44', 46', 49', 61', 70', 73'	Report

MKM Stadium, Hull
Attendance: 7,080 (Note: Match was a double header with the men's game between New Zealand and Fiji)
Referee: Ben Casty (France)
Touch judges: Geoffrey Poumes (France), Dean Bowmer (England)
Player of the Match: Belinda Gwasamun (Papua New Guinea)

6 November 2022
17:00 GMT (UTC±00:00)

New Zealand	34–4	Cook Islands
Tries: McGregor 10'; Rota 15'; Hall 31'; Albert-Jones 54'; Hufanga (2) 59', 72'; Nu'uausala 79'; Goals: Albert-Jones (1/4) 54'; Clark (3/3) 33', 74', 80'	Report	Tries: Wiki 67'

York Community Stadium, York
Attendance: 3,006
Referee: Michael Smaill (England)
Touch judges: James Vella (England), Liam Rush (England)
Player of the Match: Raecene McGregor (New Zealand)

Team details
New Zealand		Position	Cook Islands
Name	Number	Position	Number	Name
Shanice Parker	21	Fullback	16	Alekermay Tuaana
Madison Barlett	5	Wing	1	Mackenzie Wiki
Page McGregor	4	Centre	4	Daimzel Rongokea
Hailee-Jay Ormond-Maunsell	19	Centre	18	Charlize Tumu-Makara
Mele Hufanga	24	Wing	19	Tehinnah-Leal Tatuava
Laishon Albert-Jones	6	Stand off/Five eighth	6	Kimiora Breayley-Nati
Raecene McGregor	7	Scrum half/Half back	3	Kerehitina Matua
Mya Hill-Moana	8	Prop forward	8	Karol Tanevesi
Annetta Nu'uausala	9	Hooker	21	Anneka Stephens
Krystal Rota	10	Prop forward	10	April Ngatupuna
Amber Hall	12	Second row	14	Jazmon Tupou-Witchman
Otesa Pule	18	Second row	17	Lavinia Kitai
Charlotte Scanlan	16	Loose forward/Lock forward	13	Elianna Walton
Nita Maynard	14	Interchange	11	Moniqca Mo'Ale
Christyl Stowers	17	Interchange	12	Kennedy Harrison-Vahua
Crystal Tamarua	20	Interchange	22	Maleyna Hunapo (yellow card) 63' to 73'
Brianna Clark	23	Interchange	11	Terehia Matua
Ricky Henry		Coach		Rusty Matua

6 November 2022
19:30 GMT (UTC±00:00)

Australia	92–0	France
Tries: Ciesiolka 3'; Chapman (3) 6', 12', 63'; Sergis (4) 9', 17', 37', 42'; Aiken 14'; Tonegato 21'; Harden 27'; Pelite (2) 35', 79'; Robinson (3) 46', 67', 74'; Kernick 55'; Goals: Brown (10/13); Wheeler (1/2); Aiken (1/2)	Report

York Community Stadium, York
Attendance: 3,006
Referee: Rochelle Tamarua (New Zealand)
Touch judges: Neil Horton (England), Aaron Moore (England)
Player of the Match: Tarryn Aiken (Australia)

Team details
Australia		Position	France
Name	Number	Position	Number	Name
Emma Tonegato	6	Fullback	5	Manon Samarra
Julia Robinson	10	Wing	23	Margot Canal
Jessica Sergis	11	Centre	20	Anais Fourcroy
Jaime Chapman	15	Centre	4	Laureane Biville
Shenae Ciesiolka	17	Wing	15	Cloe Guillerot
Taliah Fuimaono	19	Stand off/Five eighth	6	Elisa Ciria
Tarryn Aiken	12	Scrum half/Half back	7	Alice Varela
Tallisha Harden	7	Prop forward	9	Cyndia Mansard
Lauren Brown	14	Hooker	14	Fanny Ramos
Kennedy Cherrington	16	Prop forward	8	Jeanne Bernard
Yasmin Clydsdale	18	Second row	1	Elisa Akpa
Shaylee Bent	13	Second row	12	Perrine Monsterrat
Keilee Joseph	21	Loose forward/Lock forward	21	Dorine Samarra
Shannon Mato	23	Interchange	24	Lise Michel
Holli Wheeler	9	Interchange	16	Elodie Pacull
Olivia Kernick	22	Interchange	17	Mailys Borak
Evania Pelite	24	Interchange	11	Tallis Kuresa
Brad Donald		Coach		Vincent Baloup

9 November 2022
17:00 GMT (UTC±00:00)

Canada	22–16	Brazil
Tries: Sandboe 25'; Maguire 29'; Pakulis 59'; Fittes 79'; Goals: Frananda (3/4) 31', 60', 80'	Report	Tries: Amaral 7'; Santini 44'; Bodeman 73'; Goals: Graf (2/3) 7', 75'

Headingley Stadium, Leeds
Attendance: 5,471
Referee: Michael Smaill (England)
Touch judges: Dean Bowmer (England), Geoffrey Poumes (France)

Team details
Canada		Position	Brazil
Name	Number	Position	Number	Name
Petra Woods	3	Fullback	18	Natalia Momberg
Ferris Sandboe	4	Wing	22	Edna Santini
Dani Frananda	1	Centre	3	Leticia Medeiros
Nina Bui	15	Centre	12	Amanda Welter
Lauren Mueller	20	Wing	4	Danielle Soares
Laura Mariu	10	Stand off/Five eighth	6	Giovanna Moura
Sabrina McDaid	7	Scrum half/Half back	7	Maria Graf
Ada Jane Okonkwo	22	Prop forward	8	Franciny Amaral
Alanna Fittes	6	Hooker	9	Patricia Bodeman
Elizabeth Steele	24	Prop forward	10	Paula Casemiro
Gabrielle Hindley	11	Second row	11	Patricia Oliveria
Maddy Aberg	14	Second row	17	Ana Loschi De Quadros
Megan Pakulis	13	Loose forward/Lock forward	16	Brena Prioste
Natasha Naismith	21	Interchange	2	Tati Fernandes
Kristy Sargent	8	Interchange	13	Barbara Leal
Sarah Maguire	12	Interchange	15	Franciele Barros
Jade Menin	19	Interchange	23	Natalia Jonck
Mike Castle		Coach		Paul Grundy

9 November 2022
19:30 GMT (UTC±00:00)

England	42–4	Papua New Guinea
Tries: Burke (3) 24', 46', 64'; Hardcastle (2) 28', 78'; Stanley 37'; Whitfield 52'; Beevers 75'; Goals: Stanley (5/8)	Report	Tries: Molowia 4'

Headingley Stadium, Leeds
Attendance: 5,471
Referee: Ben Casty (France)
Touch judges: Rochelle Tamarua (New Zealand), Aaron Moore (England)
Player of the Match: Jodie Cunningham (England)

Team details
England		Position	Papua New Guinea
Name	Number	Position	Number	Name
Fran Goldthorp	3	Fullback	17	Martha Molowia
Caitlin Beevers	2	Wing	23	Lisa Marie Alu
Tara-Jane Stanley	1	Centre	4	Shellie Long
Amy Hardcastle	4	Centre	3	Belinda Gwasamun
Leah Burke	5	Wing	2	Anika Butler
Georgia Roche	6	Stand off/Five eighth	6	Sera Koroi
Courtney Winfield-Hill	7	Scrum half/Half back	7	Lilah Malabag
Shona Hoyle	17	Prop forward	8	Elsie Albert
Tara Jones	9	Hooker	22	Shirley Joe
Olivia Wood	18	Prop forward	10	Gloria Kaupa
Hollie Dodd	11	Second row	11	Emily Veivers
Emily Rudge	12	Second row	12	Essay Banu
Jodie Cunningham	13	Loose forward/Lock forward	13	Jessikah Reeves
Vicky Whitfield	15	Interchange	14	Ua Ravu
Keara Bennett	21	Interchange	21	Carol Humeu
Paige Travis	19	Interchange	16	Michelle John
Grace Field	8	Interchange	5	Shae Yvonne De La Cru
Craig Richards		Coach		Ben Jeffries

10 November 2022
17:00 GMT (UTC±00:00)

France	18–26	Cook Islands
Tries: Bianchini 27'; Ciria (2) 48', 76'; Song-Puche 65'; Goals: Ciria (1/4)	Report	Tries: Ngatupuna 19'; T. Matua 30'; Wiki 42'; Tuaana 61'; Dean 73'; Goals: K. Matua (3/5)

York Community Stadium, York
Attendance: 3,370
Referee: Ben Thaler (England)
Touch judges: Belinda Sharpe (Australia), Marcus Griffiths (England)

Team details
France		Position	Cook Islands
Name	Number	Position	Number	Name
Cloe Guillerot	15	Fullback	21	Alekermay Tuaana
Cristina Song-Puche	2	Wing	24	Mackenzie Wiki
Melanie Bianchini	3	Centre	22	Jazmon Tupou-Witchman
Laureane Biville	4	Centre	20	Charlize Tumu-Makara
Anaelle Meunier	18	Wing	15	Daimzel Rongokea
Elisa Ciria	6	Stand off/Five eighth	10	Kerehitina Matua
Alice Varela	7	Scrum half/Half back	21	Anneka Stephens
Gaelle Alvherne	10	Prop forward	18	Karol-Ann Tanevesi
Fanny Ramos	14	Hooker	4	Tetuanui Dean
Cyndia Mansard	9	Prop forward	14	April Ngatupuna
Elisa Akpa	1	Second row	12	Moniqca Mo'ale
Perrine Monsarrat	12	Second row	8	Lavinia Kitai
Dorine Samarra	21	Loose forward/Lock forward	23	Elianna Walton
Jeanne Bernard	8	Interchange	5	Kennedy Harrison-Vahua
Mailys Borak	17	Interchange	3	Mireka Dean
Zoe Pastre Courtine	19	Interchange	2	Erikana Dean
Manon Samarra	5	Interchange	11	Terehia Matua
Vincent Baloup		Coach		Rusty Matua

10 November 2022
19:30 GMT (UTC±00:00)

Australia	10–8	New Zealand
Tries: Aiken 20'; Robinson 62'; Goals: Brigginshaw (1/1) 22'; Brown (0/1)	Report	Tries: Nicholls-Pualau 30'; Stephens-Daly 55'; Goals: Clark (0/2)

York Community Stadium, York
Attendance: 3,370
Referee: Todd Smith (Australia)
Touch judges: Paki Parkinson (New Zealand), Robert Hicks (England)

Team details
Australia		Position	New Zealand
Name	Number	Position	Number	Name
Samantha Bremner	2	Fullback	1	Apii Nicholls
Julia Robinson	10	Wing	3	Autumn-Rain Stephens-Daly
Jessica Sergis	11	Centre	24	Mele Hufanga
Isabelle Kelly	5	Centre	4	Page McGregor
Jaime Chapman	15	Wing	2	Katelyn Vaha'akolo
Tarryn Aiken	12	Stand off/Five eighth	15	Kararaina Wira-Kohu
Ali Brigginshaw	3	Scrum half/Half back	7	Raecene McGregor
Shannon Mato	23	Prop forward	23	Brianna Clark
Keeley Davis	8	Hooker	9	Krystal Rota
Caitlan Johnston	20	Prop forward	10	Annetta Nu'uausala
Kezie Apps	1	Second row	11	Roxy Murdoch-Masila
Yasmin Clydsdale	18	Second row	12	Amber Hall
Simaima Taufa	4	Loose forward/Lock forward	13	Georgia Hale
Kennedy Cherrington	16	Interchange	14	Nita Maynard
Shaylee Bent	13	Interchange	8	Mya Hill-Moana
Lauren Brown	14	Interchange	18	Otesa Pule
Emma Tonegato	6	Interchange	17	Christyl Stowers
Brad Donald		Coach		Ricky Henry

==== Knockout stage ====
14 November 2022
17:00 GMT (UTC±00:00)

Australia	82–0	Papua New Guinea
Tries: Davis 10'; Kelly (3) 15', 17', 37'; Bent 22'; Pelite 25'; Ciesiolka (2) 28', 46'; Kernick 34'; Sergis 42'; Harden 49'; Tonegato (3) 52', 56', 75'; Chapman 66'; Goals: Brown (9/13) 11', 23', 36', 38', 43', 47', 50', 53', 58'; Brigginshaw (2/2) 67', 76'	Report

York Community Stadium, York
Attendance: 7,139
Referee: Belinda Sharpe (Australia)
Touch judges: Rochelle Tamarua (New Zealand), Marcus Griffiths (England

Team details
Australia		Position	Papua New Guinea
Name	Number	Position	Number	Name
Emma Tonegato	3	Fullback	5	Shae Yvonne De La Cruz
Evania Pelite	2	Wing	2	Anika Butler
Isabelle Kelly	1	Centre	4	Shellie Long
Jaime Chapman	4	Centre	3	Belinda Gwasamun
Shenae Ciesiolka	5	Wing	17	Martha Molowia
Taliah Fuimaono	6	Stand off/Five eighth	6	Sera Koroi
Lauren Brown	7	Scrum half/Half back	7	Lilah Malabag
Holli Wheeler	17	Prop forward	8	Elsie Albert
Keeley Davis	9	Hooker	9	Therese Aiton
Tallisha Harden	18	Prop forward	10	Gloria Kaupa
Shaylee Bent	14	Second row	15	Bertshiba Awoi
Olivia Kernick	12	Second row	12	Essay Banu
Ali Brigginshaw	13	Loose forward/Lock forward	13	Jessikah Reeves
Jessica Sergis	15	Interchange	19	Talitha Kunjil
Yasmin Clydsdale	21	Interchange	11	Emily Veivers
Samantha Bremner	11	Interchange	16	Michelle John Ikupu
Keilee Joseph	8	Interchange	21	Carol Humeu
Brad Donald		Coach		Rusty Matua

14 November 2022
19:30 GMT (UTC±00:00)

England	6–20	New Zealand
Tries: Goldthorp 5'; Goals: Stanley (1/1) 6'	Report	Tries: Hufanga 16'; R. McGregor 29'; Pule 47'; Clark 52'; Goals: Clark (0/2); Nicholls-Pualau (2/2) 48', 53'

York Community Stadium, York
Attendance: 7,139
Referee: Kasey Badger (Australia)
Touch judges: Geoffrey Poumes (France), Robert Hicks (England)
Player of the Match: Mele Hufanga (New Zealand)

Team details
England		Position	New Zealand
Name	Number	Position	Number	Name
Fran Goldthorp	3	Fullback	1	Apii Nicholls-Pualau
Caitlin Beevers	2	Wing	2	Katelyn Vaha'akolo
Tara-Jane Stanley	1	Centre	24	Mele Hufanga
Amy Hardcastle	4	Centre	4	Page McGregor
Leah Burke	5	Wing	5	Madison Bartlett
Georgia Roche	6	Stand off/Five eighth	15	Abigail Roache
Courtney Winfield-Hill	7	Scrum half/Half back	7	Raecene McGregor
Shona Hoyle	17	Prop forward	23	Brianna Clark
Tara Jones	9	Hooker	9	Krystal Rota
Olivia Wood	18	Prop forward	10	Annetta Nu'Uausala
Vicky Molyneux	14	Second row	11	Roxy Murdoch-Masila
Emily Rudge	12	Second row	12	Amber Hall
Jodie Cunningham	13	Loose forward/Lock forward	13	Georgia Hale
Vicky Whitfield	15	Interchange	14	Nita Maynard
Keara Bennett	21	Interchange	8	Mya Hill-Moana
Hollie Dodd	11	Interchange	18	Otesa Pule
Grace Field	8	Interchange	16	Charlotte Scanlan
Craig Richards		Coach		Ricky Henry

19 November 2022
13:15 GMT (UTC±00:00)

Australia	54–4	New Zealand
Tries: Sergis (2) 4', 51'; Kelly (2) 14', 35'; Robinson 26'; Tonegato 48'; Aiken 56'; Cherrington (2) 66', 69'; Pelite 72'; Goals: Brigginshaw (2/5) 6', 70'; Brown (5/5) 36', 49', 52', 57', 67'	Report	Tries: Bartlett 64'; Goals: R. McGregor (0/1)

Old Trafford, Manchester
Attendance: 67,502
Referee: Belinda Sharpe (Australia)
Touch judges: Wyatt Raymond (Australia), Darian Furner (Australia)

Team details
Australia		Position	New Zealand
Name	Number	Position	Number	Name
Samantha Bremner	2	Fullback	1	Apii Nicholls-Pualau
Julia Robinson	10	Wing	3	Autumn-Rain Stephens-Daly
Jessica Sergis	11	Centre	24	Mele Hufanga
Isabelle Kelly	5	Centre	4	Page McGregor
Evania Pelite	24	Wing	5	Madison Bartlett
Tarryn Aiken	12	Stand off/Five eighth	15	Abigail Roache
Ali Brigginshaw	3	Scrum half/Half back	7	Raecene McGregor
Shannon Mato	23	Prop forward	23	Brianna Clark
Keeley Davis	8	Hooker	9	Krystal Rota
Kennedy Cherrington	16	Prop forward	10	Annetta Nu'uausala
Yasmin Clydsdale	18	Second row	11	Roxy Murdoch-Masila
Kezie Apps	1	Second row	12	Amber Hall
Simaima Taufa	4	Loose forward/Lock forward	13	Georgia Hale
Lauren Brown	14	Interchange	14	Nita Maynard
Emma Tonegato	6	Interchange	8	Mya Hill-Moana
Shaylee Bent	13	Interchange	18	Otesa Pule
Caitlan Johnston	20	Interchange	17	Christyl Stowers
Brad Donald		Coach		Ricky Henry

=== Wheelchair World Cup ===
==== Group stage ====
Pos	Team	Pld	W	D	L	PF	PA	PD	Pts	Qualification
1	England	3	3	0	0	263	20	+243	6	Advance to knockout stage
2	Australia	3	2	0	1	136	88	+48	4	Advance to knockout stage
3	Spain	3	1	0	2	99	188	−89	2	
4	Ireland	3	0	0	3	50	252	−202	0	

Source: rlwc2021

Pos	Team	Pld	W	D	L	PF	PA	PD	Pts	Qualification
1	France	3	3	0	0	350	27	+323	6	Advance to knockout stage
2	Wales	3	2	0	1	126	222	−96	4	Advance to knockout stage
3	United States	3	1	0	2	100	207	−107	2	
4	Scotland	3	0	0	3	92	212	−120	0	

Source: rlwc2021

3 November 2022
17:00 GMT (UTC±00:00)

Ireland	32–55	Spain
Tries: Johnston (4) 31', 46', 50', 78'; Roberts 3'; McCarthy 65'; Goals: Johnston (4)	Report (RLWC); Report (ERL)	Tries: Lacombe 7'; Monedero 59'; Martin (2) 5', 62'; Gonzalez (2) 23', 69'; Berty (3) 9', 26', 45'; Goals: Gonzalez (8); Seron; Drop goals: Gonzalez

Copper Box Arena, London
Attendance: 3,033
Referees: Laurent Abrial (France), Kim Abel (Wales)
Touch judges: Matthew Ball (England), David Roig (France)
Player of the Match: Theo Gonzalez (Spain)

Team details
Ireland		Position	Spain
Name	Number	Position	Number	Name
Toby Burton-Carter	1	Starter	1	Joel Lacombe (c)
Peter Johnston Jnr	8	Starter	2	Raphael Monedero
Rick Rodgers	3	Starter	3	Yannick Martin
Phil Roberts	9	Starter	7	Theo Gonzalez
Tom Martin	2	Starter	5	David Berty
Paddy Forbes	5	Interchange	9	Eric Perez
Oran Spain	11	Interchange	4	David Raymond
Kenneth Maloney	6	Interchange	5	Jonathan Palomo
Stephen Campbell	4	Interchange	8	Wilfrid Seron
James McCarthy	10	Interchange	10	Pascal Ambrosino
Damian McCabe		Coach		Jean-Marc Gonzalez

3 November 2022
19:30 GMT (UTC±00:00)

England	38–8	Australia
Tries: Coyd (2) 19', 22'; Brown (2) 25', 35'; Collins (2) 32', 71'; King 47'; Goals: Hawkins; Collins (4)	Report (RLWC); Report (ERL)	Tries: Karim 10'; Goals: Karim; McKenna

Copper Box Arena, London
Attendance: 3,033
Referees: Ollie Cruickshank (Scotland), David Roig (France)
Touch judges: Kim Abel (Wales), Steven Hewson (Australia)
Player of the Match: Jack Brown (England)

Team details
England		Position	Australia
Name	Number	Position	Number	Name
Tom Halliwell (c)	7	Starter	1	Peter Arbuckle
Robert Hawkins	2	Starter	5	Cory Cannane
Joe Coyd	3	Starter	6	Brad Grove (c)
Sebastien Bechara	4	Starter	12	Diab Karim
Lewis King	5	Starter	5	Zac Schumacher
Jack Brown	6	Interchange	10	Craig Cannane
Nathan Collins	1	Interchange	4	James Hill
Adam Rigby	8	Interchange	2	Liam Luff
Declan Roberts	9	Interchange	11	Bayley McKenna
Wayne Boardman	10	Interchange	9	Adam Tannock
Tom Coyd		Coach		Brett Clark

4 November 2022
11:00 GMT (UTC±00:00)

France	154–6	Wales
Tries: Alazard (6) 1', 3', 14', 21', 25', 51'; Clausells (2) 5', 53'; Guttadoro (2) 16', 74'; Bourson (5) 10', 18', 23', 33', 45'; Penella (3) 19', 37', 48'; Abassi (5) 35', 42', 55', 69', 78'; Vargas (2) 38', 71'; Hivernat 40', 67'; Goals: Alazard (13); Guttadoro (4); Penella (6)	Report	Tries: Jones 27'; Goals: Halsey

English Institute of Sport, Sheffield
Attendance: 1,129
Referees: David Butler (England), Matthew Ball (England)
Touch judges: Grant Jackson (Wales), Steven Hewson (Australia)
Player of the Match: Lionel Alazard (France)

Team details
France		Position	Wales
Name	Number	Position	Number	Name
Lionel Alazard	1	Starter	1	Stephen Halsey
Gilles Clausells (c)	2	Starter	2	Scott Trigg-Turner
Mostefa Abassi	3	Starter	3	Gary Preece
Jeremy Bourson	4	Starter	5	Jodie Boyd-Ward
Julien Penella	6	Starter	5	Stuart Williams (c)
Florian Guttadoro	10	Interchange	8	Lucie Roberts
Guillaume Mautz	12	Interchange	9	Martin Lane
Arno Vargas	7	Interchange	11	Harry Jones
Jonathan Hivernat	11	Interchange	6	Andrew Higgins
		Interchange	10	Mark Williams
Sylvain Crismanovich		Coach		Stephen Jones

4 November 2022
13:30 GMT (UTC±00:00)

Scotland	41–62	United States
Tries: Young (4) 6', 13', 17', 67'; Grant (2) 22', 51'; Blackmore 25'; Willans 43'; Goals: Willans (4)	Report (RLWC); Report (ERL)	Tries: Johnson (4) 1', 3', 28', 46'; Wooloff (2) 20', 31'; Lind (2) 34', 40'; Townsend (4) 48', 56', 66', 70'; Goals: Johnstone (5); Stewart; Townsend

English Institute of Sport, Sheffield
Attendance: 1,129
Referees: Grant Jackson (Wales), Steven Hewson (Australia)
Touch judges: Matthew Ball (England), Ollie Cruickshank (Scotland)
Player of the Match: Mackenzie Johnson (United States)

Team details
Scotland		Position	USA
Name	Number	Position	Number	Name
Connor Blackmore	9	Starter	5	Mackenzie Johnson
Dan Grant	6	Starter	10	William Johnstone
Mike Mellon	7	Starter	7	Micah Stewart
John Willans	11	Starter	1	Jeffrey Townsend (c)
Callum Young	1	Starter	5	Matthew Wooloff
Gregor Anderson	4	Interchange	2	Jesse Lind
Paul Hartley	8	Interchange	11	Andy Kingsley
Peter Lauder	12	Interchange	3	Jensen Blaine
Greame Stewart	5	Interchange	4	Freddie Smith
Caydn Thomson	2	Interchange	8	Jabrier Lee
Mark Roughsedge		Coach		Geoff Mason

6 November 2022
12:00 GMT (UTC±00:00)

England	104–12	Spain
Tries: Brown (2) 1', 6'; Simpson 13'; Boardman (2) 15', 33'; Halliwell 21'; Hawkins (5) 31', 37', 39', 70', 77'; Roberts (3) 41', 47', 74'; King 50'; Coyd (2) 57', 62'; Rigby 67'; Goals: Boardman (3/5); Collins (7/7); Roberts (6/6)	Report	Tries: Gonzalez 3'; Monedero 8'; Goals: Gonzalez (2/3)

Copper Box Arena, London
Attendance: 3,268
Referees: Kim Abel (Wales), Laurent Abriel (France)
Touch judges: David Roig (France), Grant Jackson (Wales)
Player of the Match: Robert Hawkins (England)

Team details
England		Position	Spain
Name	Number	Position	Number	Name
Tom Halliwell (c)	7	Starter	1	Joel Lacombe (c)
Lewis King	5	Starter	2	Raphael Monedero
Wayne Boardman	10	Starter	3	Yannick Martin
Jack Brown	6	Starter	7	Theo Gonzalez
James Simpson	11	Starter	5	David Berty
Nathan Collins	1	Interchange	10	Pascal Ambrosino
Joe Coyd	3	Interchange	5	Jonathan Palomo
Robert Hawkins	2	Interchange	9	Eric Perez
Adam Rigby	8	Interchange	4	David Raymond
Declan Roberts	9	Interchange	8	Wilfrid Seron
Tom Coyd		Coach		Jean-Marc Gonzalez

6 November 2022
14:30 GMT (UTC±00:00)

Australia	76–18	Ireland
Tries: Karim (2) 6', 74'; Tannock 9'; McKenna (3) 15', 37', 69'; Grove (3) 28', 35', 37'; Arbuckle 38'; Hill 45'; Luff (2) 59', 62'; Goals: McKenna (10/10); Karim (2/3)	Report	Tries: Roberts 20'; McCarthy (2) 22', 65'; Goals: Johnston (3/3)

Copper Box Arena, London
Attendance: 3,268
Referees: Matthew Ball (England), Grant Jackson (Wales)
Touch judges: Laurent Abrial (France), David Roig (France)
Player of the Match: Bayley McKenna (Australia)

Team details
Australia		Position	Ireland
Name	Number	Position	Number	Name
Bayley McKenna	11	Starter	1	Toby Burton-Carter
Diab Karim	12	Starter	8	Peter Johnston
Brad Grove (c)	6	Starter	2	Tom Martin
Adam Tannock	9	Starter	9	Phil Roberts
Peter Arbuckle	1	Starter	5	James McCarthy
Craig Cannane	10	Interchange	11	Oran Spain
Shaun Harre	3	Interchange	5	Paddy Forbes
James Hill	4	Interchange	7	Scott Robertson
Zac Schumacher	8	Interchange	6	Kenneth Maloney
Liam Luff	2	Interchange	3	Rick Rodgers
Brett Clark		Coach		Damian McCabe

7 November 2022
17:00 GMT (UTC±00:00)

France	80–15	Scotland
Tries: N Clausells (4) 1', 6', 31', 40'; Mautz (2) 16', 44'; Verdi (2) 19', 55'; Vargas (2) 22', 67'; Gattadoro 29'; Abassi (2) 26', 59'; Penella 53'; Goals: N Clausells (7/9); Duhalde (5/5)	Report	Tries: Young 13'; Mellon 63'; Grant 75'; Goals: Grant (1/2)

English Institute of Sport, Sheffield
Attendance: 1,200
Referees: Steven Hewson (Australia), Ollie Cruickshank (Scotland)
Touch judges: Grant Jackson (Wales), David Butler (England)
Player of the Match: Arno Vargas (France)

Team details
France		Position	Scotland
Name	Number	Position	Number	Name
Nicolas Clausells	8	Starter	1	Callum Young
Florian Gattadoro	10	Starter	7	Michael Mellon
Guillaume Mautz (c)	12	Starter	6	Dan Grant
Arno Vargas	7	Starter	11	John Willans
Yann Verdi	9	Starter	5	Connor Blackmore
Mostefa Abassi	3	Interchange	3	Dave Anderson
Jeremy Bourson	4	Interchange	4	Gregor Anderson
Gilles Clausells	2	Interchange	10	David Birtles
Thomas Duhalde	5	Interchange	12	Pete Lauder
Julien Penella	6	Interchange	2	Cadyn Thomson
Sylvain Crismanovich		Coach		Mark Roughsedge

7 November 2022
19:30 GMT (UTC±00:00)

Wales	50–32	United States
Tries: Preece (2) 13', 59'; S. Williams (3) 25', 29', 39'; Halsey 31'; Jones 46'; Higgins 61'; Trigg-Turner 67'; Goals: Halsey (5/6); Higgins (2/3)	Report	Tries: Townsend (4) 8', 19', 54', 72'; Johnson 11'; Wooloff 36'; Goals: Johnstone (3/4); Stewart (1/2)

English Institute of Sport, Sheffield
Attendance: 1,200
Referees: David Roig (France), David Butler (England)
Touch judges: Matthew Ball (England), Steven Hewson (Australia)
Player of the Match: Stuart Williams (Wales)

Team details
Wales		Position	USA
Name	Number	Position	Number	Name
Stephen Halsey	1	Starter	5	Mackenzie Johnson
Gary Preece	3	Starter	1	Jeffrey Townsend (c)
Jodie Boyd-Ward	5	Starter	7	Micah Stewart
Stuart Williams	2	Starter	10	William Johnstone
Martin Lane	9	Starter	5	Matthew Wooloff
Alan Caron	12	Interchange	12	Tony Leboutillier
Harry Jones	11	Interchange	2	Jesse Lind
Andrew Higgins	6	Interchange	11	Andy Kingsley
Mark Williams	10	Interchange	9	Gabi Cha
Scott Trigg-Turner	2	Interchange	3	Jensen Blaine
Stephen Jones		Coach		Geoff Mason

9 November 2022
11:00 GMT (UTC±00:00)

Australia	52–32	Spain
Tries: Arbuckle 3'; Karim (2) 9', 15'; Hill (4) 28', 32', 34', 48'; Cory Cannane 62'; Grove 72'; Goals: McKenna (3/4); Karim (3/6); Craig Cannane (2/2)	Report	Tries: Gonzalez (2) 12', 44'; Monedero (2) 22', 76'; Lacombe 50'; Martin 53'; Goals: Gonzalez (3/5); Seron (1/1)

Copper Box Arena, London
Attendance: 3,847
Referees: David Butler (England), David Roig (France)
Touch judges: Grant Jackson (Wales), Steve Hewson (Australia)
Player of the Match: James Hill (Australia)

Team details
Australia		Position	Spain
Name	Number	Position	Number	Name
Bayley McKenna	11	Starter	11	David Berty
Diab Karim	12	Starter	7	Theo Gonzalez
Brad Grove (c)	6	Starter	1	Joel Lacombe
Adam Tannock	9	Starter	3	Yannick Martin
Peter Arbuckle	1	Starter	5	Raphael Monedero
Craig Cannane	10	Interchange	4	David Raymond
Cory Cannane	5	Interchange	5	Jonathan Palomo
James Hill	4	Interchange	8	Wilfrid Seron
Zac Schumacher	8	Interchange	9	Eric Perez
Liam Luff	2	Interchange	10	Pascal Ambrosino
Brett Clark		Coach		Jean-Marc Gonzalez

9 November 2022
13:30 GMT (UTC±00:00)

England	121–0	Ireland
Tries: Bechara (2) 3', 15'; Coyd (4) 6', 17', 28', 78'; Halliwell (2) 9', 24'; Simpson (4) 12', 20', 75', 80'; Brown (3) 32', 38', 46'; Collins (3) 35', 54', 59'; King 62'; Rigby (2) 65', 71'	Report

Copper Box Arena, London
Attendance: 3,847
Referees: Oliver Cruickshank (Scotland), Grant Jackson (Wales)
Touch judges: David Roig (France), Steve Hewson (Australia)
Player of the Match: Joe Coyd (England)

Team details
England		Position	Ireland
Name	Number	Position	Number	Name
Tom Halliwell (c)	7	Starter	1	Toby Burton-Carter
Joe Coyd	3	Starter	8	Peter Johnston
Seb Bachara	4	Starter	2	Tom Martin
James Simpson	11	Starter	9	Phil Roberts
Lewis King	5	Starter	5	James McCarthy
Wayne Boardman	10	Interchange	11	Oran Spain
Nathan Collins	1	Interchange	5	Paddy Forbes
Adam Rigby	8	Interchange	7	Scott Robertson
Declan Roberts	9	Interchange	3	Rick Rodgers
Jack Brown	6	Interchange	4	Stephen Campbell
Tom Coyd		Coach		Damian McCabe

10 November 2022
11:00 GMT (UTC±00:00)

France	116–6	United States
Tries: Bourson (5) 1', 7', 9', 17', 38'; Hivernat (3) 11', 20', 23'; Abassi (5) 13', 18', 63', 75', 78'; Duhalde (2) 34', 60'; G Clausells (3) 41', 45', 51'; Mautz 55'; N Clausells 58'; Alazard 65'; Goals: Alazard (9/11); G Clausells (3/4); Duhalde (4/6)	Report	Tries: Johnson 72'; Goals: Stewart (1/1)

English Institute of Sport, Sheffield
Attendance: 1,129
Referees: Matthew Ball (England), Kim Abel (Wales)
Touch judges: David Butler (England), David Roig (France)

Team details
France		Position	USA
Name	Number	Position	Number	Name
Lionel Alazard	1	Starter	1	Jeffrey Townsend
Jonathan Hivernat	11	Starter	5	Mackenzie Johnson
Mostefa Abassi	3	Starter	6	Matthew Wooloff
Jeremy Bourson	4	Starter	7	Micah Stewart
Nicolas Clausells	8	Starter	5	William Johnstone
Julien Penella	6	Interchange	3	Jensen Blaine
Arno Vargas	7	Interchange	9	Gabi Cha
Thomas Duhalde	5	Interchange	11	Andy Kingsley
Gilles Clausells	2	Interchange	8	Jabrier Lee
Guillaume Mautz	12	Interchange	2	Jesse Lind
Sylvain Crismanovich		Coach		Geoff Mason

10 November 2022
13:30 GMT (UTC±00:00)

Wales	70–36	Scotland
Tries: Trigg-Turner (3) 2', 12', 53'; Preece 5'; Higgins (4) 16', 46', 48', 74'; Lane (2) 34', 78'; Jones (2) 36', 42'; Goals: Higgins (9/11); M. Williams (2/2)	Report	Tries: Grant (4) 8', 38', 70', 80'; Willans 22'; Mellon (2) 26', 57'; Goals: Willans (1/3); Dan Grant (3/4)

English Institute of Sport, Sheffield
Attendance: 1,129
Referees: Laurent Abrial (France), Steve Hewson (Australia)
Touch judges: Kim Abel (Wales), Grant Jackson (Wales)
Player of the Match: Andrew Higgins (Wales)

Team details
Wales		Position	Scotland
Name	Number	Position	Number	Name
Scott Trigg-Turner	2	Starter	9	Connor Blackmore
Gary Preece	3	Starter	6	Dan Grant
Jodie Boyd-Ward	5	Starter	7	Michael Mellon
Andrew Higgins	6	Starter	11	John Willans
Stuart Williams	7	Starter	5	Callum Young
Martin Lane	9	Interchange	3	Dave Anderson
Harry Jones	11	Interchange	10	David Birtles
Lucie Roberts	8	Interchange	8	Paul Hartley
Mark Williams	10	Interchange	12	Pete Lauder
Alan Caron	12	Interchange	2	Cadyn Thomson
Stephen Jones		Coach		Mark Roughsedge

==== Knockout stages ====
Semi-finals
13 November – Sheffield
France	84
Australia	40
13 November – Sheffield
England	125
Wales	22

Final
18 November – Manchester
France	24
England	28

===== Semi-finals =====
Both semi-finals were played at English Institute of Sport in Sheffield.

13 November 2022
12:00 GMT (UTC±00:00)

France	84–40	Australia
Tries: Guttadoro (3) 1', 5', 60'; Bourson (5) 6', 8', 17', 21', 26'; N Clausells (2) 28', 78'; Abassi (4) 31', 35', 39', 52'; Duhalde 75'; Goals: Alazard (7/8); G Clausells (5/7)	Report	Tries: Grove (2) 3', 69'; Schumacher 13', 58'; Karim 41'; Luff 62'; Craig Cannane 73'; Goals: McKenna (4/5); Karim (2/2)

English Institute of Sport, Sheffield
Attendance: 1,318
Referees: Ollie Cruickshank (Scotland), David Butler (England)
Touch judges: Kim Abel (Wales), Grant Jackson (Wales)
Player of the Match: Jeremy Bourson (France)

Team details
France		Position	Australia
Name	Number	Position	Number	Name
Lionel Alazard	1	Starter	1	Peter Arbuckle
Mostefa Abassi	3	Starter	6	Brad Grove (c)
Jeremy Bourson	4	Starter	12	Diab Karim
Florian Guttadoro	10	Starter	8	Zac Schumacher
Nicolas Clausells	8	Starter	5	Bayley McKenna
Gilles Clausells (c)	2	Interchange	5	Cory Cannane
Julien Penella	6	Interchange	10	Craig Cannane
Guillaume Mautz	12	Interchange	4	James Hill
Arno Vargas	7	Interchange	2	Liam Luff
Thomas Duhalde	5	Interchange	3	Shaun Harre
Sylvain Crismanovich		Coach		Brett Clark

13 November 2022
14:30 GMT (UTC±00:00)

England	125–22	Wales
Tries: Bechara (4) 2', 4', 7', 32'; Coyd (4) 11', 20', 23', 43'; Brown (8) 26', 30', 34', 36', 41', 50', 57', 59'; Hawkins (2) 28', 77'; King 46'; Collins 53'; Roberts 68'; Simpson 75'; Goals: Hawkins (7/8); Collins (10/11); Roberts (1/3); Drop goals: Roberts	Report	Tries: Trigg-Turner 17'; Preece 49'; S. Williams 55'; Caron 65'; Goals: Preece (1/2); Higgins (2/2)

English Institute of Sport, Sheffield
Attendance: 1,318
Referees: Laurent Abriel (France), Matthew Ball (England)
Touch judges: David Roig (France), Steven Hewson (Australia)
Player of the Match: Jack Brown (England)

Team details
England		Position	Wales
Name	Number	Position	Number	Name
Rob Hawkins	2	Starter	6	Andrew Higgins
Joe Coyd	3	Starter	9	Martin Lane
Seb Bechara	4	Starter	3	Gary Preece (yellow card) 75' to 80'
Lewis King	5	Starter	2	Scott Trigg-Turner
Tom Halliwell (c)	7	Starter	5	Stuart Williams (c)
Nathan Collins	1	Interchange	11	Harry Jones
Jack Brown	6	Interchange	8	Lucie Roberts
Declan Roberts	9	Interchange	12	Alan Caron
Wayne Boardman	10	Interchange	6	Jodie Boyd-Ward
James Simpson	11	Interchange	1	Stephen Halsey
Tom Coyd		Coach		Stephen Jones

===== Final =====
The final was played at Manchester Central Convention Complex in Manchester, the day before the men's and women's finals.

18 November 2022
19:30 GMT (UTC±00:00)

France	24–28	England
Tries: Alazard 10'; Abassi 29'; G Clausells 57'; Goals: Alazard (1/1); N Clausells (5/6)	Report	Tries: Halliwell (2) 19', 78'; Brown (2) 39', 53'; King 42'; Goals: Hawkins (1/1); Collins (3/5)

Manchester Central, Manchester
Attendance: 4,526
Referees: Ollie Cruickshank (Scotland), Laurent Abrial (France)
Touch judges: David Butler (England), David Roig (France)
Player of the Match: Tom Halliwell (England)

Team details
France		Position	England
Name	Number	Position	Number	Name
Mostefa Abassi	3	Starter	7	Tom Halliwell (c)
Lionel Alazard	1	Starter	2	Rob Hawkins
Jérémy Bourson	4	Starter	3	Joe Coyd
Julien Pennella	6	Starter	4	Seb Bechara
Nicolas Clausells	8	Starter	5	Lewis King
Florian Guttadoro	10	Interchange	1	Nathan Collins
Jonathan Hivernat	11	Interchange	6	Jack Brown
Guillaume Mautz	12	Interchange	9	Declan Roberts
Gilles Clausells (c)	2	Interchange	10	Wayne Boardman
Arno Vargas	7	Interchange	11	James Simpson
Sylvain Crismanovich		Coach		Tom Coyd

=== Canada men in the United States ===
5 November 2022
15:00 PDT (UTC-07:00)

United States	10–22	Canada

Tampa

=== Poland men vs Norway in England ===
Narvik Cup

12 November 2022
10:30 GMT (UTC±00:00)

Poland	22–18	Norway
Tries: Pozniak 1'; Kesik 15'; Jasinski 21'; Kłosiński 51'; Goals: Kesik (3/4)	report	Tries: Høyland (2) 26', 55'; Milligan 37'; Bjoernstad 71'; Goals: Mwikaria (0/2); Milligan (1/2)

Wanderers Sports Ground, Ilford
Referee: Matt Rossleigh (England)

Team details
Poland		Position	Norway
Name	Number	Position	Number	Name
Mateusz Kowalewski	1	Fullback	1	Franck Watio
Kamil Wilkowski	2	Wing	2	Casey Biggs
Domink Medecki	3	Centre	3	Arne Oma Torsen
Adam Jasinski	4	Centre	4	Martin Høyland
Tomek Pozniak	5	Wing	5	Patrick Justad
Lukas Lucka	6	Stand off	6	Kristoffer Milligan
Kyle Kesik	7	Scrum half	7	Stephen Mwikaria
Stef Archer	8	Prop forward	8	Mathias Vada Stenseth-Holm
Tomasz Zerbe	9	Hooker	9	Robin Bjoernstad
Harry Chmiel	10	Prop forward	10	Daniel Horne
Phil Leycock	11	Second row	11	Marius Odland Sagelv
Gab Romianowski	12	Second row	12	Nils Kristian Holte
Eryk Wisniewski	13	Loose forward	13	Harald Mikalsen.
Kacper Filipczak	14	Interchange	14	Oliver Falk
Mateusz Kłosiński	15	Interchange	15	Eric Mellor
Chris Malloney	16	Interchange	16	Andreas Vågen
Simon Adamski	17	Interchange	17	Kevin Båtnes
Colin Baker		Coach		Liam Stead

=== Argentina men vs Brazil ===
13 November 2022
13:00 AST (UTC-03:00)

Argentina	26–30	Brazil

Don Bosco Sports club, Buenos Aires

=== South American Championship ===
Pos	Team	Pld	W	D	L	PF	PA	PD	Pts	Qualification
1	Brazil	2	2	0	0	76	18	+58	4	Qualification for 2023 Americas Rugby League Championship
2	Chile	2	1	0	1	52	34	+18	2	
3	Colombia	2	0	0	2	14	90	−76	0	

Source: IRL

25 November 2022
15:30 COT (UTC-05:00)

Chile	18–20	Brazil
Tries: Altamirano (2); Vasquez; Goals: Horvat (3)	report	Tries: Melo (2); Caetano; Paixāo; Goals: Domingues; Araujo

Estadio JB Londoño, Jericó
Referee: Andrew Pilkington (Spain)
Touch judges: Juan Blumetti (Argentina), Hugo Pulido (Colombia)

Team details
Chile		Position	Brazil
Name	Number	Position	Number	Name
Thomas Garrido	1	Fullback	1	Ravi Araujo
Zecil Yao	2	Wing	2	Marcos Paixāo
Jaime Santander	3	Centre	3	Douglas Parazi
Daniel Polanco	4	Centre	4	Donovan Barreira
Felipe Aedo	5	Wing	5	Fellipe Dittz
Christian Lopez	6	Five eighth	6	Victor Domingues
James Horvat	7	Half back	7	Zach Grundy
Ignacio Altamirano	8	Prop forward	8	Caio Ozzioli (c)
Mana Castillo-Sioni	9	Hooker	9	Lucas Domingues
Austin Olivares Ekes	10	Prop forward	10	Alyfer Dos Santos
Taylor Salas	11	Second row	11	Leandro Caetano
Nick Doberer (c)	12	Second row	12	Nicholas Sydorowitz
Daniel Vasquez	13	Lock forward	13	Gabriel Saraiva
Juan Ortiz	14	Interchange	14	Vinicius Parazi
Diego Quintul	15	Interchange	15	Diego Sanches Nogueira
Ferec Cabezas	16	Interchange	16	Luiz Bussolo
Moises Rojas	17	Interchange	17	Bruno Gil Melo
Andrew Charles		Coach		Zach Grundy

26 November 2022
15:30 COT (UTC-05:00)

Colombia	14–34	Chile
Tries: Garcia (2); Zuluaga; Goals: Linares (1)	report	Tries: Vasquez (2); Yao; Horvat; Altamirano; Sales; Goals: Horvat (5)

Estadio JB Londoño, Jericó
Referee: Andrew Pilkington (Spain)
Touch judges: Juan Blumetti (Argentina), Emiliano Rodriguez (Argentina)

Team details
Columbia		Position	Chile
Name	Number	Position	Number	Name
Carlos Mendoza	1	Fullback	1	Thomas Garrido
Jessue Guillot	2	Wing	2	Diego Quintul
Jesus Delgado	3	Centre	3	Zecil Yao
Ruben Zequeda	4	Centre	4	Felipe Aedo
David Perez	5	Wing	5	Juan Ortiz
Sebastian Martinez (c)	6	Five eighth	6	Christian Lopez
Hector Linares	7	Half back	7	James Horvat
Andres Jimenez	8	Prop forward	8	Ignacio Altamirano
Nelson Parada	9	Hooker	9	Mana Castillo-Sioni
Leonardo Delgado	10	Prop forward	10	Taylor Salas
Johnny Garcia	11	Second row	11	Jaime Santander
Fredy Diaz	12	Second row	12	Nick Doberer (c)
Andrew Zuluaga	13	Lock forward	13	Daniel Vasquez
Jean Villamil	14	Interchange	14	Moises Rojas
William Martinez	15	Interchange	15	Ferec Cabezas
Daniel Medina	16	Interchange
Juan David Espinal	17	Interchange

27 November 2022
15:30 COT (UTC-05:00)

Brazil	56–0	Colombia
Tries: Caetano (3); Ozzioli (3); Araujo; Paixao; Grundy; Dos Santos; Goals: Araujo (8)	report

Estadio JB Londoño, Jericó
Referee: Andrew Pilkington (Spain)
Touch judges: Hugo Pulido (Colombia), Emiliano Rodriguez (Argentina)

Team details
Brazil		Position	Columbia
Name	Number	Position	Number	Name
Ravi Araujo	1	Fullback	1	Jean Villamil
Marcos Paixao	2	Wing	2	Carlos Mendoza
Douglas Parazi	3	Centre	3	Jesus Delgado
Donovan Barreira	4	Centre	4	Sebastian Rodger
Felipe Dittz	5	Wing	5	Jessue Guillot
Victor Domingues	6	Five eighth	6	Sebastian Martinez
Zach Grundy	7	Half back	7	Hector Linares
Caio Ozzioli	8	Prop forward	8	Andres Jimenez
Lucas Domingues	9	Hooker	9	Nelson Parada
Alyfer Dos Santos	10	Prop forward	10	Leonardo Delgado
Leandro Cateano	11	Second row	11	John Garcia
Gabriel Saraiva	12	Second row	12	Fredy Diaz
Nicholas Sydorowitz	13	Lock forward	13	Andrew Zuluaga
Bruno Gil Melo	14	Interchange	14	Carlos Mendoza
Vinicius Parazi	15	Interchange	15	William Martinez
Diego Sanches Nogueira	16	Interchange	16	Daniel Medina
Luis Bussolo	17	Interchange	17	Victor Alegria

=== Poland men vs South Africa in Australia ===
26 November 2022
TBA AEST (UTC+10:00)

Poland	16–38	South Africa

Owen Park, Gold Coast

=== Turkey men vs North Macedonia in Australia ===
26 November 2022
TBA AEDT (UTC+11:00)

Turkey	22–24	North Macedonia

Terry Lamb Complex, Sydney

== See also ==
- Impact of the COVID-19 pandemic on rugby league
