= 2021 Men's Rugby League World Cup squads =

The 2021 Men's Rugby League World Cup featured 16 international teams, with each consisting of up to a 24-man squad.

== Group A ==
=== England ===
Head coach: (England) Shaun Wane

England announced their 24-man squad on 30 September 2022. Debut call-ups were handed to Andy Ackers, Herbie Farnworth, Kai Pearce-Paul, Victor Radley, Marc Sneyd and Dom Young.

#	Player	Games	Points	Club
19	Andy Ackers	2	8	(England) Salford Red Devils
22	Joe Batchelor	1	4	(England) St Helens
12	John Bateman	4	4	(England) Wigan Warriors
8	Tom Burgess	5	16	(Australia) South Sydney Rabbitohs
17	Mike Cooper	4	0	(England) Wigan Warriors
4	Herbie Farnworth	4	12	(Australia) Brisbane Broncos
5	Ryan Hall	2	16	(England) Hull Kingston Rovers
18	Chris Hill	5	0	(England) Huddersfield Giants
15	Morgan Knowles	4	0	(England) St Helens
16	Matty Lees	3	4	(England) St Helens
2	Tommy Makinson	4	68	(England) St Helens
9	Michael McIlorum	4	0	(France) Catalans Dragons
20	Mike McMeeken	4	4	(France) Catalans Dragons
23	Mikolaj Oledzki	1	0	(England) Leeds Rhinos
24	Kai Pearce-Paul	1	4	(England) Wigan Warriors
13	Victor Radley	5	4	(Australia) Sydney Roosters
21	Marc Sneyd	2	44	(England) Salford Red Devils
10	Luke Thompson	3	4	(Australia) Canterbury-Bankstown Bulldogs
1	Sam Tomkins (c)	4	0	(France) Catalans Dragons
3	Kallum Watkins	4	8	(England) Salford Red Devils
6	Jack Welsby	5	4	(England) St Helens
11	Elliot Whitehead	4	16	(Australia) Canberra Raiders
7	George Williams	5	12	(England) Warrington Wolves
14	Dom Young	5	36	(Australia) Newcastle Knights

=== France ===
Head coach: (France) Laurent Frayssinous

France announced their 24-man squad on 24 September 2022. Experienced players Théo Fages, Julian Bousquet, and Romain Navarrete were all unavailable due to injuries, as was Lucas Albert. Samisoni Langi qualified via 5-years residency in 2022 and made himself available for France rather than Tonga, who he represented at the previous two tournaments (although did not play a match in 2017).

#	Player	Games	Points	Club
10	Lambert Belmas	2	0	(France) Toulouse Olympique
9	Alrix Da Costa	3	0	(France) Catalans Dragons
8	Jordan Dezaria	3	4	(France) Catalans Dragons
1	Morgan Escaré	2	0	(England) Salford Red Devils
13	Benjamin Garcia (c)	3	0	(France) Catalans Dragons
7	Tony Gigot	3	4	(France) Toulouse Olympique
17	Mickaël Goudemand	3	0	(France) Catalans Dragons
24	Louis Jouffret	0	0	(England) Halifax Panthers
11	Benjamin Jullien	3	8	(France) Catalans Dragons
4	Matthieu Laguerre	3	0	(France) Catalans Dragons
3	Samisoni Langi	3	0	(France) Catalans Dragons
19	Corentin Le Cam	2	0	(France) Catalans Dragons
22	Paul Marcon	0	0	(France) Toulouse Olympique
18	Anthony Marion	0	0	(France) Toulouse Olympique
6	Arthur Mourgue	3	28	(France) Catalans Dragons
14	Éloi Pélissier	3	4	(France) Toulouse Olympique
21	Maxime Puech	1	0	(France) Toulouse Olympique
2	Arthur Romano	3	4	(France) Catalans Dragons
23	César Rougé	1	0	(France) Catalans Dragons
15	Justin Sangaré	3	0	(France) Toulouse Olympique
12	Paul Séguier	3	0	(France) Catalans Dragons
16	Gadwin Springer	2	0	(England) Featherstone Rovers
20	Maxime Stefani	0	0	(France) Toulouse Olympique
5	Fouad Yaha	2	4	(France) Catalans Dragons

=== Greece ===
Head coach: (Greece) Steve Georgallis

Greece announced their 24-man squad on 15 September 2022. The squad includes players from the professional competitions and from the Greek domestic competition. Billy Tsikrikas was initially named in the squad but withdrew. He was replaced by Siteni Taukamo. Flocas, Gal, Ilias and Taukamo are the only uncapped players in the squad. Grigoris Koutsimpogiorgos was ruled out for the remainder of the tournament due to concussion. Adam Vrahnos was added to the squad as his replacement.

#	Player	Games	Points	Club
10	Stefanos Bastas	1	0	(Greece) Rhodes Knights
23	Nikolaos Bosmos	1	0	(Greece) Rhodes Knights
3	Terry Constantinou	3	0	(Australia) Sunbury Tigers
18	Aris Dardamanis	1	0	(Greece) Aris Eagles
12	Nick Flocas	3	0	(Australia) Ipswich Jets
15	Myles Gal	2	0	(Australia) Sunshine Coast Falcons
6	Lachlan Ilias	3	8	(Australia) South Sydney Rabbitohs
14	Jake Kambos	3	0	(Australia) Western Suburbs Magpies
21	Konstantinos Katsidonis	1	0	(Greece) Rhodes Knights
24	Grigoris Koutsimpogiorgos	0	0	(Greece) Aris Eagles
13	Billy Magoulias	2	0	(Australia) Newtown Jets
9	Peter Mamouzelos	3	0	(Australia) South Sydney Rabbitohs
7	Jordan Meads (c)	2	0	(Australia) University of the Sunshine Coast
5	Johnny Mitsias	3	0	(Australia) Western Suburbs Magpies
4	Nick Mougios	3	4	(Australia) South Sydney Rabbitohs
20	Ioannis Nake	1	0	(Greece) Attica Rhinos
17	Theodoros Nianiakas	3	0	(Greece) Aris Eagles / (England) Woolston Rovers
1	Chaise Robinson	2	0	(Australia) South Sydney Rabbitohs
22	Ioannis Rousoglou	1	0	(Greece) Aris Eagles
16	Sebastian Sell	3	0	(Australia) Mittagong Lions
19	Liam Sue-Tin	1	0	
2	Siteni Taukamo	3	8	(Australia) Cronulla-Sutherland Sharks
8	Robert Tuliatu	2	0	(England) London Broncos
25	Adam Vrahnos	2	0	(England) London Broncos
11	Mitchell Zampetides	2	0	(Australia) Western Suburbs Magpies

=== Samoa ===
Head coach: (Australia) Matt Parish

Samoa announced their 24-man squad on 27 September 2022. Luciano Leilua was initially included in the squad but was withdrawn after he was charged with two criminal offences. Ligi Sao was announced as his replacement on 8 October. Braden Hamlin-Uele, Tyrone May and Hamiso Tabuai-Fidow were ruled out for the remainder of the tournament due to injury. Ken Sio and Tim Lafai were added to the squad as their replacements.

#	Player	Games	Points	Club
13	Josh Aloiai	2	0	(Australia) Manly Warringah Sea Eagles
21	Fa'amanu Brown	2	4	(Australia) Wests Tigers
4	Stephen Crichton	6	73	(Australia) Penrith Panthers
19	Mat Feagai	1	4	(Australia) St. George Illawarra Dragons
24	Braden Hamlin-Uele	1	0	(Australia) Cronulla-Sutherland Sharks
20	Chanel Harris-Tavita	5	12	New Zealand Warriors
15	Royce Hunt	5	4	(Australia) Cronulla-Sutherland Sharks
23	Oregon Kaufusi	5	0	(Australia) Parramatta Eels
25	Tim Lafai	5	24	(England) Salford Red Devils
16	Spencer Leniu	4	0	(Australia) Penrith Panthers
9	Danny Levi	4	8	(England) Huddersfield Giants
6	Jarome Luai	6	8	(Australia) Penrith Panthers
2	Taylan May	4	16	(Australia) Penrith Panthers
14	Tyrone May	1	0	(France) Catalans Dragons
7	Anthony Milford	5	8	(Australia) Newcastle Knights
8	Josh Papali'i	6	0	(Australia) Canberra Raiders
10	Junior Paulo (c)	6	4	(Australia) Parramatta Eels
11	Ligi Sao	5	4	(England) Hull F.C.
26	Ken Sio	0	0	(England) Salford Red Devils
12	Jaydn Su'a	6	4	(Australia) St. George Illawarra Dragons
1	Joseph Sua'ali'i	6	0	(Australia) Sydney Roosters
18	Hamiso Tabuai-Fidow	1	0	(Australia) North Queensland Cowboys
3	Izack Tago	1	4	(Australia) Penrith Panthers
17	Martin Taupau	5	0	(Australia) Manly Warringah Sea Eagles
5	Brian To'o	6	20	(Australia) Penrith Panthers
22	Kelma Tuilagi	4	0	(Australia) Wests Tigers

== Group B ==
=== Australia ===
Head coach: (Australia) Mal Meninga

Australia announced their 24-man squad on 3 October 2022. Debut call-ups were handed to Matt Burton, Patrick Carrigan, Nathan Cleary, Lindsay Collins, Reuben Cotter, Angus Crichton, Tino Fa'asuamaleaui, Campbell Graham, Harry Grant, Liam Martin, Jeremiah Nanai, Murray Taulagi and Isaah Yeo. Nicho Hynes, Dylan Edwards and Damien Cook were named as standby players.

The players' jersey numbers were announced on 6 October. The decision to number players in order of their Kangaroos debut (except captain James Tedesco, who was allocated #1), rather than the conventional positional numbering, was met with widespread backlash and derision.

#	Player	Games	Points	Club
9	Josh Addo-Carr	5	48	(Australia) Canterbury-Bankstown Bulldogs
12	Matt Burton	2	4	(Australia) Canterbury-Bankstown Bulldogs
6	Reagan Campbell-Gillard	4	0	(Australia) Parramatta Eels
13	Patrick Carrigan	5	0	(Australia) Brisbane Broncos
2	Daly Cherry-Evans	3	0	(Australia) Manly Warringah Sea Eagles
14	Nathan Cleary	5	68	(Australia) Penrith Panthers
15	Lindsay Collins	3	4	(Australia) Sydney Roosters
16	Reuben Cotter	2	0	(Australia) North Queensland Cowboys
17	Angus Crichton	5	8	(Australia) Sydney Roosters
18	Tino Fa'asuamaleaui	5	0	(Australia) Gold Coast Titans
19	Campbell Graham	2	20	(Australia) South Sydney Rabbitohs
20	Harry Grant	5	4	(Australia) Melbourne Storm
4	Valentine Holmes	6	22	(Australia) North Queensland Cowboys
3	Ben Hunt	5	4	(Australia) St. George Illawarra Dragons
21	Liam Martin	5	12	(Australia) Penrith Panthers
8	Latrell Mitchell	5	20	(Australia) South Sydney Rabbitohs
7	Cameron Munster	5	0	(Australia) Melbourne Storm
11	Cameron Murray (vc)	5	20	(Australia) South Sydney Rabbitohs
22	Jeremiah Nanai	2	8	(Australia) North Queensland Cowboys
23	Murray Taulagi	2	8	(Australia) North Queensland Cowboys
1	James Tedesco (c)	6	20	(Australia) Sydney Roosters
5	Jake Trbojevic	5	0	(Australia) Manly Warringah Sea Eagles
10	Jack Wighton	5	8	(Australia) Canberra Raiders
24	Isaah Yeo (vc)	5	8	(Australia) Penrith Panthers

=== Fiji ===
Head coach: (Fiji) Wise Kativerata

Fiji announced their 24-man squad on 4 October 2022. A 33-man squad was initially named on 6 September 2022.

Head coach Joe Rabele was replaced by Wise Kativerata after being hospitalised due to illness. Pio Seci (#3), Mikaele Ravalawa (#5), and Kaylen Miller (#15) all suffered tournament-ending injuries during Fiji's warm-up match against England on 7 October. They were replaced by Korbin Sims, Mitieli Vulikijapani, and Tevita Toloi.

#	Player	Games	Points	Club
23	Jowasa Drodrolagi	1	0	(France) AS Carcassonne
13	Tui Kamikamica	3	0	(Australia) Melbourne Storm
24	Vuate Karawalevu	3	0	(Australia) Sydney Roosters
12	Viliame Kikau (c)	4	12	(Australia) Penrith Panthers
9	Apisai Koroisau	4	8	(Australia) Penrith Panthers
21	Isaac Lumelume	0	0	(Australia) Canterbury-Bankstown Bulldogs
16	Lamar Manuel-Liolevave	4	0	(Australia) Tweed Heads Seagulls
18	Netane Masima	0	0	(Australia) Wests Magpies
6	Sitiveni Moceidreke	1	0	(England) London Broncos
4	Kevin Naiqama (c)	4	12	(Australia) Sydney Roosters
10	Ben Nakubuwai	3	4	(England) Leigh Centurions
20	Henry Raiwalui	3	6	(Australia) Mount Pritchard Mounties
8	Joseph Ratuvakacereivalu	1	0	(Australia) Redcliffe Dolphins
11	Taniela Sadrugu	4	8	(Australia) North Queensland Cowboys
3	Korbin Sims	3	4	(England) Hull Kingston Rovers
2	Maika Sivo	4	16	(Australia) Parramatta Eels
14	Penioni Tagituimua	4	8	(Australia) Canterbury-Bankstown Bulldogs
15	Tevita Toloi	1	0	(Australia) Newcastle Knights
1	Sunia Turuva	4	4	(Australia) Penrith Panthers
19	Semi Valemei	4	4	(Australia) Canberra Raiders
5	Mitieli Vulikijapani	1	0	(England) Hull FC
17	King Vuniyayawa	4	0	(England) Salford Red Devils
7	Brandon Wakeham	4	30	(Australia) Canterbury-Bankstown Bulldogs
22	Siua Wong	4	0	(Australia) Sydney Roosters

=== Italy ===
Head coach: (Australia) Leo Epifania

Italy announced their 24-man squad on 30 September 2022. Cooper Johns was initially named in the squad but withdrew and was replaced by Radean Robinson.

#	Player	Games	Points	Club
23	Giordano Arena	0	0	(Italy) Catania Bulls
3	Daniel Atkinson	3	0	(Australia) Sunshine Coast Falcons
22	Simone Boscolo	0	0	(France) RC Salon XIII
13	Nathan Brown (c)	3	0	(Australia) Parramatta Eels
6	Jack Campagnolo	3	10	(Australia) South Sydney Rabbitohs
16	Gioele Celerino	2	0	(France) Racing Saint Gaudens
20	Jack Colovatti	3	0	(Australia) Parramatta Eels
19	Luke Hodge	2	0	(Australia) Blacktown Workers Sea Eagles
10	Anton Iaria	3	0	(England) Barrow Raiders
11	Ryan King	2	0	(England) Whitehaven
2	Richard Lepori	2	0	(England) Swinton Lions
5	Jake Maizen	3	16	(Australia) Sunshine Coast Falcons
15	Luca Moretti	3	0	(Australia) Parramatta Eels
4	Ethan Natoli	3	0	(Australia) Newtown Jets
24	Ippolito Occhialini	0	0	(Italy) Lignano Sharks
17	Ronny Palumbo	1	4	(England) London Broncos
9	Dean Parata	3	4	(England) London Broncos
18	Kyle Pickering	1	0	(Australia) Cronulla Sharks
1	Luke Polselli	3	4	(Australia) Sunshine Coast Falcons
7	Radean Robinson	3	0	(Australia) Central Queensland Capras
12	Brenden Santi (vc)	3	16	(England) Keighley Cougars
8	Alec Susino	2	0	(Australia) Penrith Panthers
21	Nicholas Tilburg	0	0	(Australia) Wentworthville Magpies
14	Joey Tramontana	3	0	(Australia) Blacktown Workers Sea Eagles

=== Scotland ===
Head coach: (Scotland) Nathan Graham

Scotland announced their 24-man squad on 28 September 2022. They announced their squad numbers on 14 October.

#	Player	Games	Points	Club
11	Euan Aitken	2	0	New Zealand Warriors
15	Luke Bain	3	0	(Australia) Parramatta Eels
8	Logan Bayliss-Brow	3	0	(Australia) Brisbane Broncos
13	James Bell	3	0	(England) St Helens
7	Ryan Brierley	1	0	(England) Salford Red Devils
4	Kieran Buchanan	3	0	(England) Batley Bulldogs
1	Lewis Clarke	0	0	(Scotland) Edinburgh Eagles
20	Davey Dixon	1	0	(England) Dewsbury Rams
17	Charlie Emslie	1	0	(England) Barrow Raiders
24	Dale Ferguson (c)	3	0	(England) Dewsbury Rams
19	Calum Gahan	3	0	(England) London Broncos
16	Guy Graham	2	0	(England) Whitehaven
6	Bailey Hayward	2	0	(Australia) Canterbury-Bankstown Bulldogs
3	Ben Hellewell	3	4	(England) Featherstone Rovers
9	Liam Hood	2	0	(England) Wakefield Trinity
12	Kane Linnett	3	0	(England) Hull Kingston Rovers
23	Bayley Liu	2	4	(England) Sheffield Eagles
10	Sam Luckley	2	0	(England) Salford Red Devils
2	Matty Russell	3	0	(France) Toulouse Olympique
14	Kyle Schneider	3	2	(Australia) Mackay Cutters
18	Jack Teanby	2	0	(England) York City Knights
21	Shane Toal	0	0	(England) Barrow Raiders
22	Alex Walker	1	0	(England) London Broncos
5	Lachlan Walmsley	3	8	(England) Halifax Panthers

== Group C ==
=== Ireland ===
Head coach: (Republic of Ireland) Ged Corcoran

Ireland announced their 24-man squad on 29 September 2022. They announced their squad numbers on 14 October.

#	Player	Games	Points	Club
11	James Bentley	3	4	(England) Leeds Rhinos
2	Keanan Brand	0	0	(England) Leigh Centurions
8	Liam Byrne	2	0	(England) Wigan Warriors
3	Ed Chamberlain	3	14	(England) Leigh Centurions
9	Josh Cook	3	0	(Australia) Canterbury-Bankstown Bulldogs
12	Frankie Halton	3	4	(England) Hull Kingston Rovers
22	James Hasson	3	0	(Australia) South Sydney Rabbitohs
10	Jaimin Jolliffe	2	0	(Australia) Gold Coast Titans
6	Luke Keary	3	0	(Australia) Sydney Roosters
7	Joe Keyes	3	6	(England) Halifax Panthers
13	George King (c)	3	4	(England) Hull Kingston Rovers
4	Toby King	3	4	(England) Wigan Warriors
24	Ben Mathiou	0	0	(England) Featherstone Rovers
14	James McDonnell	1	4	(England) Wigan Warriors
21	Ronan Michael	1	0	(England) York City Knights
19	Robbie Mulhern	1	0	(England) Warrington Wolves
1	Richie Myler	3	0	(England) Leeds Rhinos
17	Dan Norman	1	0	(England) St Helens
16	Brendan O'Hagan	3	4	(England) York City Knights
18	Henry O'Kane	1	0	(Australia) Wests Tigers
15	Harry Rushton	3	0	(England) Huddersfield Giants
5	Innes Senior	3	4	(England) Huddersfield Giants
20	Louis Senior	3	24	(England) Hull Kingston Rovers
23	Michael Ward	0	0	(England) Batley Bulldogs

=== Jamaica ===
Head coach: (Jamaica) Romeo Monteith

Jamaica announced their 24-man squad on 28 September 2022. Six players from the domestic competition are named in the squad, including former Excelsior Community College winger Abevia McDonald (now playing for London Skolars).

#	Player	Games	Points	Club
2	Mo Agoro	3	4	(England) Keighley Cougars
15	Jordan Andrade	3	4	Unattached
22	Chevaughn Bailey	3	0	(Jamaica) Duhaney Park Red Sharks
3	Joe Brown	3	0	(England) Workington Town
9	Jy-mel Coleman	1	0	Unattached
12	Joel Farrell	2	0	(England) Sheffield Eagles
13	Ashton Golding (c)	3	0	(England) Huddersfield Giants
19	Bradley Ho	2	0	(England) Keighley Cougars
20	Greg Johnson	2	0	(England) Batley Bulldogs
17	Aaron Jones-Bishop	1	0	(England) Cornwall
1	Ben Jones-Bishop	3	4	(England) Sheffield Eagles
10	Michael Lawrence	3	0	(England) Huddersfield Giants
18	Abevia McDonald	1	0	(England) London Skolars
8	Khamisi McKain	1	0	(Jamaica) Duhaney Park Red Sharks
4	Jacob Ogden	3	0	(England) York City Knights
21	Ross Peltier	1	0	(England) Dewsbury Rams
7	Kieran Rush	3	6	(England) Huddersfield Giants
24	Andrew Simpson	1	0	(Jamaica) Duhaney Park Red Sharks
14	Marvin Thompson	1	0	(Jamaica) Duhaney Park Red Sharks
16	Keenen Tomlinson	3	0	(England) Dewsbury Rams
23	Renaldo Wade	0	0	(Jamaica) Duhaney Park Red Sharks
11	AJ Wallace	3	0	(England) Bradford Bulls
6	James Woodburn-Hall	3	2	(England) Halifax Panthers
5	Alex Young	2	0	(England) Workington Town

=== Lebanon ===
Head coach: (Australia) Michael Cheika

Lebanon announced their 24-man squad on 29 September 2022. Atef Hamdan was initially named in the squad but withdrew. He was replaced by Robin Hachache.

#	Player	Games	Points	Club
17	Jalal Bazzaz	4	0	(Australia) Western Suburbs Red Devils
6	Adam Doueihi	3	12	(Australia) Wests Tigers
10	Hanna El-Nachar	1	0	(Australia) Penrith Panthers
24	Toufic El Hajj	4	8	(Lebanon) American University of Beirut
11	Elie El-Zakhem	4	4	(Australia) Parramatta Eels
23	Robin Hachache	0	0	(Lebanon) Tripoli Kings
8	Kayne Kalache	2	0	(Australia) Newtown Jets
15	Andrew Kazzi	4	0	(Australia) Western Suburbs Magpies
1	Jacob Kiraz	3	4	(Australia) Canterbury-Bankstown Bulldogs
14	Anthony Layoun	3	0	(Australia) St Marys Saints
3	Bilal Maarbani	1	0	(Australia) Blacktown Workers Sea Eagles
2	Josh Mansour	4	20	(Australia) South Sydney Rabbitohs
21	Josh Maree	1	0	(Australia) Wentworthville United
22	Tony Maroun	1	4	(Australia) Ryde-Eastwood Hawks
5	Abbas Miski	4	16	(England) Wigan Warriors
4	Brad Morkos	4	4	(Australia) Canberra Raiders
7	Mitchell Moses (c)	4	30	(Australia) Parramatta Eels
20	Jaxson Rahme	3	0	(Australia) South Sydney Rabbitohs
19	Khalil Rahme	4	0	(Australia) Mount Pritchard Mounties
18	Khaled Rajab	3	4	(Australia) Canterbury-Bankstown Bulldogs
16	Reece Robinson	4	8	Unattached
13	James Roumanos	4	0	(Australia) Manly Warringah Sea Eagles
9	Michael Tannous	3	4	(Australia) Wests Tigers
12	Charbel Tasipale	4	8	(Australia) Newtown Jets

=== New Zealand ===
Head coach: (Australia) Michael Maguire

New Zealand announced their 24-man squad on 3 October 2022. A 34-man squad was initially named, which included Braden Hamlin-Uele, Corey Harawira-Naera, Shaun Johnson, Ken Maumalo, Griffin Neame, Jordan Riki, Matt Timoko, Kodi Nikorima and Bailey Simonsson.

#	Player	Games	Points	Club
16	Nelson Asofa-Solomona	5	4	(Australia) Melbourne Storm
8	Jesse Bromwich (c)	4	0	(Australia) Melbourne Storm
12	Kenny Bromwich	4	8	(Australia) Melbourne Storm
6	Dylan Brown	4	12	(Australia) Parramatta Eels
10	James Fisher-Harris	5	4	(Australia) Penrith Panthers
14	Kieran Foran	5	12	(Australia) Manly Warringah Sea Eagles
4	Peta Hiku	5	16	(Australia) North Queensland Cowboys
7	Jahrome Hughes	3	12	(Australia) Melbourne Storm
24	Sebastian Kris	1	4	(Australia) Canberra Raiders
15	Moses Leota	2	0	(Australia) Penrith Panthers
20	Isaac Liu	4	0	(Australia) Gold Coast Titans
1	Joseph Manu	5	12	(Australia) Sydney Roosters
22	Jeremy Marshall-King	2	8	(Australia) Canterbury-Bankstown Bulldogs
2	Ronaldo Mulitalo	4	8	(Australia) Cronulla Sutherland Sharks
21	Charnze Nicoll-Klokstad	4	4	(Australia) Canberra Raiders
17	Briton Nikora	5	8	(Australia) Cronulla Sutherland Sharks
3	Marata Niukore	2	4	(Australia) Parramatta Eels
11	Isaiah Papali'i	5	0	(Australia) Parramatta Eels
5	Jordan Rapana	4	44	(Australia) Canberra Raiders
9	Brandon Smith	5	8	(Australia) Sydney Roosters
23	Scott Sorensen	1	0	(Australia) Penrith Panthers
13	Joseph Tapine	4	0	(Australia) Canberra Raiders
18	Jared Waerea-Hargreaves	1	0	(Australia) Sydney Roosters
19	Dallin Watene-Zelezniak	1	20	New Zealand Warriors

== Group D ==
=== Cook Islands ===
Head coach: (New Zealand) Tony Iro

The Cook Islands announced their 24-man squad on 4 October 2022. Adam Tangata and Malachi Morgan were named as standby players. Anthony Gelling withdrew from the squad following their match against Papua New Guinea on 25 October.

#	Player	Games	Points	Club
14	Tevin Arona	1	0	(New Zealand) Auckland Vulcans
15	Tinirau Arona	1	6	(England) Wakefield Trinity
22	Geoff Daniela	1	0	(Australia) St Marys Saints
7	Johnathon Ford	2	0	(England) Featherstone Rovers
3	Anthony Gelling	2	8	(New Zealand) Auckland Vulcans
1	Kayal Iro	3	4	(Australia) Cronulla Sharks
8	Makahesi Makatoa	3	0	(Australia) Parramatta Eels
4	Esan Marsters (c)	3	0	(Australia) Gold Coast Titans
5	Steven Marsters	3	18	(Australia) Thirroul Butchers
20	Davvy Moale	3	4	(Australia) South Sydney Rabbitohs
10	Tepai Moeroa	3	0	(Australia) Melbourne Storm
24	Dylan Napa	1	0	(France) Catalans Dragons
17	Rua Ngatikaura	2	0	(Australia) Wests Tigers
18	Moses Noovao-McGreal	1	0	(Australia) Norths Devils
19	Pride Petterson-Robati	1	0	New Zealand Warriors
11	Dominique Peyroux	3	0	(France) Toulouse Olympique
12	Brendan Piakura	2	0	(Australia) Brisbane Broncos
23	Reuben Porter	1	0	(Australia) Tweed Heads Seagulls
16	Reubenn Rennie	2	0	(Australia) Newtown Jets
21	Vincent Rennie	1	0	(Australia) Newtown Jets
6	Brad Takairangi (c)	3	0	(England) Hull Kingston Rovers
9	Aaron Teroi	3	0	(Australia) Central Queensland Capras
13	Zane Tetevano	3	0	(England) Leeds Rhinos
2	Paul Ulberg	3	4	(England) London Broncos

=== Papua New Guinea ===
Head coach: (Papua New Guinea) Stanley Tepend

Papua New Guinea announced their 24-man squad on 3 October 2022. On 21 October, Coates and Gebbie were ruled out for the rest of the tournament due to injury. No replacements were added.

#	Player	Games	Points	Club
8	Wellington Albert	4	0	(England) London Broncos
13	Jacob Alick	4	0	(Australia) Gold Coast Titans
18	Keven Appo	2	0	Papua New Guinea Hunters
23	Watson Boas	3	0	(England) Doncaster
5	Xavier Coates	0	0	(Australia) Melbourne Storm
2	Edene Gebbie	0	0	(Australia) Townsville Blackhawks
9	Edwin Ipape	4	0	(England) Leigh Leopards
24	Zev John	0	0	(Australia) Central Queensland Capras
1	Alex Johnston	4	0	(Australia) South Sydney Rabbitohs
7	Lachlan Lam	4	8	(England) Leigh Leopards
6	Kyle Laybutt	4	8	(Australia) Townsville Blackhawks
3	Nene Macdonald	4	0	(England) Leigh Leopards
12	Rhyse Martin (c)	4	36	(England) Leeds Rhinos
10	Sylvester Namo	3	0	Papua New Guinea Hunters
19	Jimmy Ngutlik	3	12	(Australia) Western Suburbs Magpies
4	Justin Olam (vc)	4	4	(Australia) Melbourne Storm
11	Nixon Putt	4	8	(Australia) Central Queensland Capras
15	Daniel Russell	4	8	(Australia) Brisbane Tigers
22	Jeremiah Simbiken	2	0	(Australia) Redcliffe Dolphins
20	Rodrick Tai	4	8	Papua New Guinea Hunters
21	Sherwin Tanabi	1	0	Papua New Guinea Hunters
14	Wesser Tenza	1	0	Papua New Guinea Hunters
17	Emmanuel Waine	2	0	Papua New Guinea Hunters
16	McKenzie Yei	3	0	(Australia) Central Queensland Capras

=== Tonga ===
Head coach: (Australia) Kristian Woolf

Tonga announced their 24-man squad on 3 October 2022. A 38-man squad was initially named on 16 September.

#	Player	Games	Points	Club
6	Talatau Amone	2	4	(Australia) St. George Illawarra Dragons
18	David Fifita	4	4	(Australia) Gold Coast Titans
8	Addin Fonua-Blake	4	0	New Zealand Warriors
17	Moeaki Fotuaika	4	4	(Australia) Gold Coast Titans
9	Siliva Havili	1	0	(Australia) South Sydney Rabbitohs
1	Will Hopoate	1	0	(England) St Helens
23	Konrad Hurrell	1	0	(England) St Helens
24	Isaiya Katoa	3	50	(Australia) Penrith Panthers
5	Sione Katoa	4	4	(Australia) Cronulla Sharks
11	Felise Kaufusi	4	4	(Australia) Melbourne Storm
12	Keaon Koloamatangi	4	8	(Australia) South Sydney Rabbitohs
20	Toluta'u Koula	2	0	(Australia) Manly-Warringah Sea Eagles
7	Tuimoala Lolohea	4	14	(England) Huddersfield Giants
14	Soni Luke	4	0	(Australia) Penrith Panthers
21	Ben Murdoch-Masila	3	0	New Zealand Warriors
22	Tesi Niu	2	16	(Australia) Brisbane Broncos
15	Haumole Olakau'atu	1	0	(Australia) Manly-Warringah Sea Eagles
4	Will Penisini	3	20	(Australia) Parramatta Eels
19	Moses Suli	3	0	(Australia) St. George Illawarra Dragons
3	Siosifa Talakai	2	2	(Australia) Cronulla Sharks
16	Tevita Tatola	3	0	(Australia) South Sydney Rabbitohs
10	Sio Siua Taukeiaho (c)	3	4	(Australia) Sydney Roosters
13	Jason Taumalolo (c)	2	8	(Australia) North Queensland Cowboys
2	Daniel Tupou	4	24	(Australia) Sydney Roosters

=== Wales ===
Head coach: (England) John Kear

Wales announced their 24-man squad on 3 October 2022. Ben Evans was ruled out for the remainder of the tournament due to a throat injury. He was replaced by Luke Thomas.

#	Player	Games	Points	Club
1	Caleb Aekins	3	0	(England) Leigh Centurions
17	Bailey Antrobus	3	0	(England) York City Knights
24	Gavin Bennion	2	0	(England) Rochdale Hornets
16	Joe Burke	3	0	West Wales Raiders
12	Chester Butler	3	0	(England) Bradford Bulls
19	Mike Butt	1	0	(England) Swinton Lions
18	Connor Davies	3	0	(England) Workington Town
15	Curtis Davies	3	0	(England) Whitehaven
13	Ben Evans	1	0	(England) Bradford Bulls
22	Kyle Evans	2	4	(England) Wakefield Trinity
3	Rhys Evans	0	0	(England) Bradford Bulls
4	Will Evans	2	0	(England) Whitehaven
10	Dan Fleming	3	0	(England) Featherstone Rovers
9	Matty Fozard	3	6	(England) Widnes Vikings
5	Dalton Grant	1	0	(England) London Broncos
21	Tom Hopkins	1	0	(England) Barrow Raiders
6	Elliot Kear (c)	3	0	(England) Bradford Bulls
11	Rhodri Lloyd	2	4	(England) Swinton Lions
23	James Olds	0	0	(Australia) Fortitude Valley Diehards
14	Ollie Olds	3	4	(Australia) Fortitude Valley Diehards
7	Josh Ralph	3	0	(Australia) Mount Pritchard Mounties
20	Luis Roberts	0	0	(England) Leigh Centurions
25	Luke Thomas	0	0	(England) Warrington Wolves
8	Anthony Walker	3	0	(England) Bradford Bulls
2	Rhys Williams	3	0	(England) Salford Red Devils
