= 2021 Men's Rugby League World Cup qualification – Europe Repechage =

2019 European play-off tournament
- Number of teams: 6
- Matches played: 6
- Points scored: 357 (59.5 per match)
- Tries scored: 64 (10.67 per match)
- Top scorer: (Scotland) Ryan Brierley (42)
- Top try scorers: (Scotland) Will Oakes (4) (Scotland) David Scott (4)

The 2019 Rugby League European play-off tournament was the final phase of European qualifying to the 2021 Rugby League World Cup, played in October and November 2019. It featured six nations, five of whom have come through the previous phases of European qualifying - 2018 European Championship, 2018 European Championship B and 2018–19 European Championship C. The competition was played in two groups of three with the winners and runners up in each group qualifying for the World Cup.

== Teams and pool draw ==
Team	Qualified via	Seeding for tournament
Ireland	2018 European Championship 3rd place	1st
Scotland	2018 European Championship 4th place	1st
Italy	Direct entry to play-off	2nd
Russia	2018 European Championship B winner	2nd
Spain	2018 European Championship B runner-up	3rd
Greece	2018–19 European Championship C winner	3rd
Serbia	Replaced Russia	–

The draw for the two groups was made on 12 December 2018. Teams with the same seeding will not play in the same group, each group will be a single round-robin with each team playing each other once. Group A was drawn as Ireland, Italy, and Spain, and Group B as Scotland, Russia, and the winners of the Euro C play-off game. Greece defeated Norway in May 2019 to take the position in Group B.

In August 2019, it was announced that Russia were withdrawing from the competition and would be replaced by Serbia, who finished third in the 2018 Euro B tournament. No specific reason was given for Russia's withdrawal, though the decision was foreshadowed by allegations from the Serbian Rugby League that Russia's Association of Rugby League Clubs did not provide the necessary paperwork for VISA removal for their Australian-based players ahead of their Euro B match in Moscow in October 2018.

== Fixtures ==
=== Group A ===
Pos	Team	Pld	W	D	L	PF	PA	PD	Pts	Qualification
1	Ireland	2	2	0	0	67	12	+55	4	Qualification for 2021 Rugby League World Cup
2	Italy	2	1	0	1	38	29	+9	2	Qualification for 2021 Rugby League World Cup
3	Spain	2	0	0	2	12	76	−64	0	

Source: ERL

26 October 2019
17:00 CEST (UTC+02:00)

Spain	8–42	Ireland
Tries: R. Franco; Goals: Pallares (2/2)	Report	Tries: McCarthy (2), Bentley, Keyes, McNally, Podesta, Roberts; Goals: Podesta (7/7)

Ciutat de l'Esport, Xàtiva
Attendance: 1,013
Referee: Geoffrey Poumes (France)
Touch judges: Ludovic Bernard (France), Alexandre Guedes (France)

Team details

FB	1	Romain Franco
WG	2	Alexis Escamilla
CE	3	Antonio Puerta (yellow card)
CE	4	Alex Doutres (c)
WG	5	Daniel Garcia
FE	6	Luc Franco
HB	7	Romain Pallares
PR	8	Gaetan Estruga
HK	9	Miguel Blanco-Charters
PR	10	Maxime Garcia
SR	11	Emir Walid Bouregba
SR	12	Anthony Delgado
LK	13	Julien Agullo
Interchange:
BE	14	Kevin Aparicio
BE	15	Ludovic Renu
BE	16	Rafael Garcia
BE	17	Simon Juarez
Coach:
Darren Fisher

FB	1	Ethan Ryan
WG	2	Matt Coade
CE	3	Frankie Halton
CE	4	James Bentley
WG	5	Roland Podesta
SO	6	Gregg McNally
SH	7	Joe Keyes (yellow card)
PR	8	Liam Byrne
HK	9	Bob Beswick (c)
PR	10	Pat Moran
SR	11	Oliver Roberts
SR	12	Tyrone McCarthy
LF	13	George King
Interchange:
BE	15	Ronan Michael
BE	16	Danny Bridge
BE	17	Michael Ward
BE	19	Declan O'Donnell
Coach:
Stuart Littler

Notes:

- This match was originally fixtured to be played at Estadio Matías Prats in Torredonjimeno.

2 November 2019
16:00 CET (UTC+01:00)

Italy	34–4	Spain
Tries: Passera (2), Campagnolo, King, Santi, Tramontana; Goals: Campagnolo (5/7)	Report	Tries: L. Franco; Goals: Pallares (0/1)

Stadio G. Teghil, Lignano Sabbiadoro
Referee: Benjamin Casty (France)
Touch judges: Jaroslav Bžoch (Czech Republic), Geoffrey Poumes (France)

Team details

FB	1	Samuel Dolores
WG	2	Emanuele Passera (yellow card)
CE	3	Ethan Natoli (red card)
CE	4	Ronny Palumbo
WG	5	Richard Lepori
FE	6	Gus Garzaniti
HB	7	Jack Campagnolo
PR	8	Alec Susino
HK	9	Joey Tramontana
PR	10	Brenden Santi (c)
SR	11	Ryan King
SR	12	Alexander Myles
LK	13	Gioele Celerino
Interchange:
BE	14	Daniel Petralia
BE	15	Anton Iaria
BE	16	Rhys Sciglitano
BE	17	John Trimboli
Coach:
Leo Epifania

FB	1	Romain Franco
WG	2	Alexis Escamilla
CE	3	Daniel Garcia
CE	4	Alex Doutres (c)
WG	5	Ludovic Renu
FE	6	Luc Franco
HB	7	Romain Pallares
PR	8	Gaetan Estruga
HK	9	Miguel Blanco-Charters
PR	10	Kevin Aparicio
SR	11	Antonio Puerta
SR	12	Rafael Garcia
LK	13	Julien Agullo (yellow card)
Interchange:
BE	14	Miquel Tomàs
BE	15	Maxime Garcia
BE	16	Emir Walid Bouregba
BE	17	Anthony Delgado
Coach:
Darren Fisher

9 November 2019
19:00 IST (UTC+01:00)

Ireland	25–4	Italy
Tries: Moran (2), McNally, King; Goals: Podesta (4/4); Drop goals: Keyes	Report	Tries: Tramontana; Goals: Campagnolo (0/1)

Morton Stadium, Santry
Referee: Liam Moore (England)
Touch judges: Gareth Jones (England), Andy Smith (England)

Team details

FB	1	Ethan Ryan
WG	2	Matt Coade
CE	3	Zack McComb
CE	4	James Bentley
WG	5	Roland Podesta
SO	6	Gregg McNally
SH	7	Joe Keyes
PR	8	Liam Byrne
HK	9	Bob Beswick (c)
PR	10	Pat Moran
SR	11	Frankie Halton
SR	12	Tyrone McCarthy
LF	13	George King
Interchange:
BE	15	Ronan Michael
BE	16	Danny Bridge
BE	17	Michael Ward
BE	19	James Mulvaney
Coach:
Stuart Littler

FB	1	Samuel Dolores
WG	2	Emanuele Passera
CE	3	Ethan Natoli
CE	4	Ronny Palumbo
WG	5	Richard Lepori
FE	6	Gus Garzaniti
HB	7	Jack Campagnolo
PR	8	Alec Susino
HK	9	Joey Tramontana
PR	10	Brenden Santi (c) (yellow card)
SR	11	Ryan King
SR	12	Alexander Myles
LK	13	Gioele Celerino
Interchange:
BE	14	Daniel Petralia
BE	15	Anton Iaria
BE	16	Rhys Sciglitano
BE	17	John Trimboli
Coach:
Leo Epifania

=== Group B ===
Pos	Team	Pld	W	D	L	PF	PA	PD	Pts	Qualification
1	Scotland	2	2	0	0	128	24	+104	4	Qualification for 2021 Rugby League World Cup
2	Greece	2	1	0	1	106	48	+58	2	Qualification for 2021 Rugby League World Cup
3	Serbia	2	0	0	2	6	168	−162	0	

Source: ERL

26 October 2019
15:00 BST (UTC+01:00)

Scotland	86–0	Serbia
Tries: Oakes (3), Scott (3), Brierley (2), Alex Walker (2), Glohe, Hellewell, Kavanagh, McLelland, Turland; Goals: Brierley (13/15)	Report

Lochinch Sports Pavilion, Glasgow
Attendance: 300
Referee: Tom Grant (England)
Touch judges: Dean Bowmer (England), Jack Smith (England)

Team details

FB	1	Alex Walker
WG	2	Davey Dixon
CE	3	David Scott
CE	4	Ben Hellewell
WG	5	Will Oakes
SO	6	Callum McLelland
SH	7	Ryan Brierley
PR	8	Luke Douglas
HK	9	Danny Addy (yellow card)
PR	10	Adam Walker
SR	11	Nick Glohe
SR	12	Ben Kavanagh
LF	13	Dale Ferguson (c)
Interchange:
BE	15	Sam Luckley
BE	17	Kieran Moran
BE	20	Matt Hogg
BE	23	Dan Turland
Coach:
Nathan Graham

FB	1	Vojislav Dedić
WG	2	Zane Bijorac
CE	3	Aleksandar Djordjević
CE	4	James Mirčeski (yellow card)
WG	5	Dragan Janković
FE	6	Daniel Marjanović
HB	7	Ben Stevanović
PR	8	Vladica Nikolić
HK	9	Rajko Janković (yellow card)
PR	10	Miloš Ćalić
SR	11	Jason Muranka
SR	12	Stefan Nedeljković
LK	13	Stevan Stevanović (c)
Interchange:
BE	14	Lazar Živković
BE	15	Vladimir Milutinović
BE	16	Ilija Radan (yellow card)
BE	17	Daniel Burke
Coach:
Stuart Wilkinson

1 November 2019
20:20 GMT (UTC+00:00)

Greece	24–42	Scotland
Tries: Kambos, Mamouzelos, Tuliatu, Zampetides; Goals: Meads (4/4)	Report	Tries: Kavanagh (2), McLelland (2), Brierley, Douglas, Oakes, Scott; Goals: Brierley (2/6), Thomas (2/2), Douglas (1/1)

New River Stadium, London
Attendance: 350
Referee: James Child (England)
Touch judges: Peter Brooke (England), Matt Rossleigh (England)

Team details

FB	1	Terry Constantinou
WG	2	John Mitsias
CE	3	Grigoris Koutsimpogiorgos
CE	4	Mitchell Zampetides
WG	5	Nick Mougios
FE	6	Chaise Robinson
HB	7	Jordan Meads (c)
PR	8	Stefano Totidis
HK	9	Peter Mamouzelos
PR	10	Robert Tuliatu
SR	11	Sebastian Sell
SR	12	Jake Kambos
LK	13	Billy Magoulias
Interchange:
BE	14	Konstantinos Katsidonis
BE	15	Stefanos Bastas
BE	16	Jake Vrahnos
BE	17	Theodoros Nianiakas
Coach:
Steve Georgallis

FB	1	Alex Walker
WG	20	Matt Hogg
CE	3	David Scott
CE	2	Davey Dixon
WG	5	Will Oakes
SO	6	Callum McLelland
SH	7	Ryan Brierley
PR	8	Luke Douglas
HK	9	Danny Addy
PR	15	Sam Luckley
SR	11	Nick Glohe
SR	12	Ben Kavanagh
LF	13	Dale Ferguson (c)
Interchange:
BE	10	Dan Turland
BE	16	Joe McClean
BE	17	Kieran Moran (yellow card)
BE	21	Liam Faughlin
Coach:
Nathan Graham

9 November 2019
13:00 CET (UTC+01:00)

Serbia	6–82	Greece
Tries: Mirčeski; Goals: Zogović (1/1)	Report	Tries: Robinson (3), Bosmos (2), Meads (2), Mitsias (2), Constantinou, Dardamanis, Kambos, Magoulias, Mamouzelos, Mougios, G. Tsikrikas; Goals: Meads (9)

Makiš Stadium, Belgrade
Attendance: 180
Referee: Robert Hicks (England)
Touch judges: Denys Cherniev (Ukraine), Andrew Pilkington (Spain)

Team details

FB	1	Miloš Zogović
WG	2	Dragan Janković
CE	3	Zane Bijorac
CE	4	Aleksandar Djordjević
WG	5	Rajko Trifunović
FE	6	Vojislav Dedić
HB	7	Daniel Burke
PR	8	Vladica Nikolić
HK	9	Vlada Dedić
PR	16	Miloš Ćalić
SR	11	Jason Muranka
SR	12	James Mirčeski
LK	13	Stevan Stevanović (c)
Interchange:
BE	10	Vladimir Milutinović
BE	14	Ilija Radan
BE	15	Nikola Srbljanin
BE	17	Lazar Živković
Coach:
Stuart Wilkinson

FB	6	Chaise Robinson
WG	2	Nikolaos Bosmos
CE	5	Nick Mougios
CE	4	Terry Constantinou
WG	3	John Mitsias
FE	13	Billy Magoulias
HB	7	Jordan Meads (c)
PR	8	Stefanos Bastas
HK	9	Peter Mamouzelos
PR	16	Billy Tsikrikas
SR	11	Jake Kambos
SR	12	Sebastian Sell
LK	10	George Tsikrikas
Interchange:
BE	1	Adam Vrahnos
BE	15	Stefano Totidis
BE	17	Robert Tuliatu
BE	18	Aris Dardamanis
Coach:
Steve Georgallis
