= Rugby league in Greece =

- Country: Greece
- Governing body: Greek Rugby League Association
- National teams: Men's; Women's
- First played: 2006
- Registered players: 116 (in 2016/17)
- Clubs: 20 (in 2022)

National competitions
- Rugby League World Cup

Rugby league is a team sport that is relatively new to Greece.

== History ==
The Greece national team was formed in 2003 by Greek Australians. Rugby league was subsequently introduced to Greece in 2006. The first match played in Greece was contested by the Olympus Eels and Attica Tigers, with the teams consisting of a mixture of local rugby union players and Greek Australians. A few days later on 28 October 2006, Athens hosted an international match against Serbia, which Greece won 44–26.

The initial attempt to find a Greek RL Federation, started by Colin Mylonas, in 2003. Mylonas and his associates spent a lot of money until 2007, but they failed to form a Greek-based Federation. Colin Mylonas was involved with the continued development of the game until 2010. This included Greece playing in the 2008 University Rugby League World Cup after Russia pulled out. Greece was made up of 10 Australian based players with Greek heritage and 10 players from Greece were flown out to Australia. They achieved great success beating France in the plate Final. In the same tournament, Greece beat Scotland Ireland and came very close in beating England only losing on the bell. This put Greece on the map in playing rugby league. Other achievements included winning the Mediterranean Cup in 2010 played in Sydney beating Italy in the final, in front of 3000 people. Greece also played Fiji in Sydney in 2009 losing but gaining respect as a nation on the rise.

Colin Mylonas in 2010 had decided to withdraw from the organisation due to differences in the direction of the Greek Rugby League.

In December 2012, the Greek rugby league committee, working in co-operation with the Serbian Rugby League Federation, ran a training course which saw the first Greek coaches complete their Level 1 qualification. In August 2013, an application for federation status was approved by an Athens Magistrates Court and the Hellenic Federation of Rugby League (HFRL) was formed and accorded observer status of the Rugby League European Federation (RLEF). In February 2014, the HFRL was granted affiliate member status by the RLEF.

In April 2016, the HFRL was suspended from the RLEF following a year-long investigation for "wilfully acting in a manner prejudicial to the interests of the RLEF and international rugby league." In July 2016, the Ministry of Culture and Sports accepted a proposal for the HFRL to be replaced as the governing body for rugby league in Greece by the Hellenic Federation of Modern Pentathlon (HFMP) with the HFLR being replaced by its rugby league technical committee. The HRFL was expelled from the RLEF in August 2016 for failing to meet membership requirements. The new governing body continued with the organisation of a domestic competition. Meanwhile, the RLEF ran a separate, recognised competition in the 2016/17 period.

In March 2017, the Greek Rugby League Association (GRLA) was recognised by the RLEF as the official governing body for rugby league in Greece, and was granted observer status. The conflict between the HFRL/HFMP and the RLIF continued until August 2022 when the GRLA was finally recognised as the official body for the sport by the Greek government.

In December 2017, national team captain Stefanos Bastas became the first Greek domestic player to sign a professional playing contract when he secured a one-year deal with the Hemel Stags.

Greece competed at the delayed 2021 Rugby League World Cup in which it was their first time qualifying for the tournament. Led by captain Billy Magoulias along with other established NRL stars lachlan Ilias and Peter Mamouzelos they played against France, Samoa and host nation England and performed credibly though failed to win a match.

== Competitions ==
=== GRLA clubs ===
Greece's rugby league clubs are located in 4 cities.

Club	Colours	City	Joined	Notes
A.E.K.		Athens	2019/20	Former HFRL club (A.E.K. Kokkinias)
A.E.L.		Larissa	2018/19	
Aris Eagles		Athens	2016/17	GRLA founder; former HFRL club (Aris Petroupolis)
Athens City Raiders		Athens	2019/20	
Attica Rhinos		Athens	2016/17	GRLA founder; former HFRL club (Pegasus Neos Kosmos)
Patras Panthers		Patras	2016/17	Joined the inaugural GRLA competition in 2016/17
Rhodes Knights		Rhodes	2016/17	GRLA founder; former HFRL club

=== HFRL clubs ===
Club	Colours	City	Joined	Notes
A.E.K. Kokkinias		Athens	2013/14	Left the HFRL in 2019 and joined the GRLA
Agios Thomas Goudi		Athens (Goudi)	2015/16	
Argos Wolves		Argos	2014/15	Joined the 2nd division only; club folded
Aris Petroupolis		Athens	2013/14	Left the HFRL and founded the GRLA as the Aris Eagles
Haidari Lions		Athens (Haidari)	2014/15	Joined the 2nd division only; club folded
Neapoli Lakοnias		Neapoli Voion	2013/14	Joined the 2nd division only
Pegasus Neos Kosmos		Athens	2013/14	Left the HFRL and founded the GRLA as the Attica Rhinos
Promitheas Rendi		Athens	2013/14	Fielded only a 2nd division team in 2014/15
Pyrrichios Aspropyrgou		Aspropyrgos	2014/15	
Rhodes Knights		Rhodes	2013/14	Left the HFRL and founded the GRLA

The domestic XIII competition for 2017/18.

=== XIII Teams ===
No	Club
1	Promitheas Nikaia / Rendis
2	Pyrihios Aspropyrgou
3	A.E.K.

=== 9's Teams ===
No	Club
1	Promitheas Nikaia / Rendis
2	Pyrihios Aspropyrgou
3	A.E.K.
2	Nemesis Thessaloniki
3	A.O. Kavala

Promitheas, AEKK, and Pegasus participated in a regional 2012–2013 championship of Athens. In the 2013/2014 Promitheas, AEKK, Pegasus, Aris and Knights participated in the A' Division, with the Knights winning the championship. In the B' Division, Neapoli, AEKK B', Promitheas B', Aris B' and Pegasus B' participated. Nepoli won the championship.

For the 2014/15 season, there were ten teams taking part: Division 1: Rhodes Knights, AEK Kokkinias, Aris Petroupolis, Pyrrihios Aspropyrgou (1st team) and Pegasus Neos Kosmos. Pegasus won the championship. Division 2: Neapoli Lakonias, Argos Wolves, Haidari Lions, Pyrrihios Aspropyrgou ('B' team) and Promitheas Rentis.

For the 2015/16 season, a new formation was planned. South Group: AEK Kokkinias, Pyrrihios Aspropyrgos and Agios Thomas. Pyrrihios won the tournament. North Group: Filippos Vereea and 2 teams from Thessaloniki. Finally, the tournament did not operate. As a result, Pyrrihios was named 2015–2016 Greece Champions. Two RL 9's tournaments took place: a) in Nikaea, Piraeus (AEK Kokkinias won vs Pyrrihios and Agios Thomas) and b) in Thessaloniki (Agios Thomas won vs Lions/Kavala, Pyrrihios and Thessaloniki).

In 2016–2017 season, four teams participated in the XIII tournament: Pyrrichios Aspropyrgou, Aghios Thomas Goudi, A.O. Kavala and ASP Chalkidonikos. In the 9's tournaments, five teams participated (Promitheas, Pyrrichios, St. Thomas, Nemesis, and Kavala). Pyrrichios won 2 of the cups and St. Thomas 1.

In 2017–2018 season, three teams participate in the XIII tournament: Pyrrichios Aspropyrgou, Promitheas Rendi and A.E.K.. In the 9's tournaments, five teams participate (Promitheas, Pyrrichios, A.E.K., Nemesis, Kavala. A.E.K. won 1 cup and Promitheas 1.

An unofficial 7's tournament was also played on 9 February 2013. Participating teams apart from Promitheas and AEK PK included the newly formed team "Neapoli Lakonias" that was created in Peloponnese in 2013. Promitheas won the tournament.

== National teams ==
=== Men's team ===
The first representative game involving Greece was played in 2003 against New Caledonia with Greece winning 26–10. The first representative game played in Greece was played in 2006 with Greece defeating Serbia 44–26 in Athens. These teams were not recognised by the Greek sports Authorities. In 2011 a touring GB Student "Pioneers" team played a game vs an unofficial "national" team consisting of players from the two Rhodes teams in Rhodes island. The Pioneers won. In October 2013 the Greece National Team (under the authority of the newly formatted HFRL) played an international against Hungary in Budapest. The Greek team was a mixture of local players from the fledgling Greek national competition and heritage players from Australia. Greece won the game 90–0.

In 2014, Greece participated in the RLEF European Championship C. Greeks won the tournament (32–18 vs Malta and 68–16 vs the Czech Rep.). In 2014, Greece won the Balkan Cup in Belgrade, Serbia (58–4 vs Bosnia/Herzegovina and 50–22 vs Serbia). In 2015 Greece withdrew from the RLEF European Championship C in Malta, due to financial reasons. Greeks played the home match vs Spain (lost by 4–76). That was the first Greece national team consisted only by domestic players. After the recognition of the sport by the Ministry of Culture and Sports in 2016, the Hellenic federation of Modern Pentathlon, formed a rugby league committee. As a result, the first recognised by the country's highest sport authority National Team, played twice vs Italy in L'Aquila and in Nikaea Piraeus. The opponent LIRFL is the only RL governing body recognised in Italy by the Italian Olympic Committee (CONI).

The Greek men’s team advanced to the final 16 of the delayed 2021 Rugby League World Cup, where their pool included host nation England, eventual runners-up Samoa, and France, a team that has played international rugby league for over 50 years.

=== Women's team ===
The women's national team was established in 2019 and played in the 2022 Rugby League Women's European Championship B in which they won the southern group. In 2024, Greece took part in qualification for the 2026 World Cup, but were knocked out in the play-off for the World Series.
