= Thomas Hopkins =

Thomas Hopkins may refer to:

- L. Thomas Hopkins (1889–1982), American progressive education theorist
- Thomas Hopkins (American football) (born 1960), NFL player
- Thomas Hopkins (gymnast) (1903–1983), British Olympic gymnast
- Thomas Hopkins (water polo) (born 1984), American water polo player
- Thomas Hopkins (settler) (1616–1684), early settler of Providence Rhode Island
- Thomas C. Hopkins (died 1948), American politician
- Thomas Chew Hopkins (1808–1876), American politician and physician
- Tom Hopkins (footballer) (1911–?), English footballer
- Tom Hopkins (rugby league) (born 1992), Wales international rugby league footballer
- Tom Hopkins (rugby union) (1903–1980), Welsh international rugby union player
- Thomas Hopkins Gallaudet (1787–1851) was an American educator of the deaf
