= Konstantinos Katsidonis =

Greece international rugby league footballer

Konstantinos 'Kostas' Katsidonis
Personal information
- Full name: Konstantinos Katsidonis
- Born: 7 September 1999 (age 25)
- Height: 183 cm (6 ft 0 in)
- Weight: 86 kg (190 lb; 13 st 8 lb)

Playing information
- Position: Centre
Representative
Years	Team	Pld	T	G	FG	P
2017–	Greece	10	3	0	0	12
- Source: As of 27 January 2023

Konstantinos Katsidonis (born 7 September 1999) is a Greece international rugby league footballer who plays for the Rhodes Knights.

== Playing career ==
In 2022, Katsidonis was named in the Greece squad for the 2021 Rugby League World Cup, the first ever Greek Rugby League squad to compete in a World Cup.
