= Nikolaos Bosmos =

Greece international rugby league footballer

Personal information
- Full name: Nikolaos Bosmos
- Born: 4 August 1988 (age 36)
- Height: 176 cm (5 ft 9 in)
- Weight: 91 kg (201 lb; 14 st 5 lb)

Playing information
- Position: Five-eighth, Halfback
Club
Years	Team	Pld	T	G	FG	P
2017	Rhodes Knights	57	30	119	1
Representative
Years	Team	Pld	T	G	FG	P
2014–	Greece	11	6	14	0	52
- Source: As of 24 October 2022

Nikolaos Bosmos (born 4 August 1988) is a Greece international rugby league footballer who plays for the Rhodes Knights.

== Playing career ==
In 2022, Bosmos was named in the Greece squad for the 2021 Rugby League World Cup, the first ever Greek Rugby League squad to compete in a World Cup.
