= Hellenic Federation of Rugby League =

Governing body for rugby league in Greece, 2013–2016

- Founded: 2013
- RLEF affiliation: 2013 to 2016
- Responsibility: Greece
- Key people: Anastasios Pantazidis (Chair)
- Website: www.rugbyleague.gr

(Greece)

The Hellenic Federation of Rugby League, or simply Hellas Rugby League, was the governing body for the sport of rugby league football in Greece between 2013 and 2016. The association was founded in 2013 by Anastasios "Tasos" Pantazidis.

The body was accorded observer status within the Rugby League European Federation (RLEF) in August 2013, and affiliate status in February 2014.

In April 2016, the HFRL was suspended from the RLEF following a year-long investigation for "wilfully acting in a manner prejudicial to the interests of the RLEF and international rugby league." The HFRL was expelled from the RLEF in August 2016 for failing to meet membership requirements.

In July 2016, the Ministry of Culture and Sports accepted a proposal for the HFRL to be replaced as the governing body for rugby league in Greece by the Hellenic Federation of Modern Pentathlon who then formed a rugby league technical committee. The HFMoP, together with LIRFL, PRL and other organisations, founded the World Rugby League to run their own rugby league organisation on an international scale.

The Greek Rugby League Association (GRLA) has been recognised by the RLEF as the governing body of rugby league in Greece since March 2017. The conflict between the HFRL/HFMP and the RLIF continued, but ended in August 2022 when the Greek government recognised the GRLA as the governing body for the sport in Greece.

== See also ==
- Rugby league in Greece
- Greek Rugby League Association
- Greece national rugby league team (men)
- Greece national rugby league team (women)
