= Ioannis Rousoglou =

Greece international rugby league footballer (born 1989)

Personal information
- Full name: Ioannis Rousoglou
- Born: 15 November 1989 (age 36)
- Height: 188 cm (6 ft 2 in)
- Weight: 105 kg (231 lb; 16 st 7 lb)

Playing information
- Position: Prop, Second-row
Representative
Years	Team	Pld	T	G	FG	P
2014–	Greece	13	1	0	0	4
- Source: As of 27 January 2023

Ioannis Rousoglou (born 15 November 1989) is a Greece international rugby league footballer who plays for the Aris Eagles.

== Playing career ==
In 2020, Rousoglou trialled with French Elite Two Championship team Villegailhenc-Aragon XIII, playing 2 games.

In 2022, Rousoglou was named in the Greece squad for the 2021 Rugby League World Cup, the first ever Greek Rugby League squad to compete in a World Cup.
