= Hanna El-Nachar =

Lebanon international rugby league footballer

Personal information
- Full name: Hanna-Jonathan El-Nachar
- Born: Australia

Playing information
- Position: Prop
Representative
Years	Team	Pld	T	G	FG	P
2022–	Lebanon	1	0	0	0	0
- Source: As of 26 October 2022

Hanna El-Nachar is a Lebanon international rugby league footballer who plays as a prop for the Penrith Panthers in the NSW Cup.

== Background ==
El-Nachar is of Lebanese descent.

== Playing career ==
=== Club career ===
El-Nachar came through the youth system at the Penrith Panthers, playing in the Harold Matthews Cup in 2017, Laurie Daley Cup in 2018, the S.G. Ball Cup in 2018 and 2019 and the Jersey Flegg Cup side in 2021 and 2022. He progressed into the Penrith NSW Cup side in 2022, featuring in two games.

=== International career ===
In 2022 El-Nachar was named in the Lebanon squad for the 2021 Rugby League World Cup.

He made his international debut in October 2022 against New Zealand in Warrington.
