= Greek Rugby League Association =

Sporting Body

Greek Rugby League Federation
- Founded: 2017
- ERL affiliation: 2017 (observer); 2018 (affiliate)
- Responsibility: Greece
- Headquarters: Athens
- Key people: George Stilianos (President)
- Coach: Steve Georgallis
- Website: www.greekrl.com

(Greece)

The Greek Rugby League Federation (GRLF), formerly Greek Rugby League Association (GRLA), is the governing body for the sport of rugby league football in Greece since 2017 and officially recognised by the Greek Ministry of Sports in August 2022.

== History ==
The GRLA was formed in 2017 following the expulsion of the Hellenic Federation of Rugby League from the Rugby League European Federation (now European Rugby League) the previous year. The body was accorded observer status with the RLEF in March 2017, and affiliate status in March 2018. Due to the Hellenic Federation holding government recognition via its integration with the Hellenic Federation of Modern Pentathlon, any matches held under the GRLA were de facto illegal under Greek law.

In August 2022 the GRLA was finally recognised as the official body for the sport from the Greek state and received the national federation status. This recognition brought to an end the situation where the national team played 'home' fixtures abroad or in secret. The first international home game of the national team (women) took place in October 2022 at Gorytsa Park field, Aspropyrgos.

== See also ==
- Rugby league in Greece
- Greece national rugby league team (men)
- Greece national rugby league team (women)
