= Mitchell Zampetides =

Greece international rugby league footballer

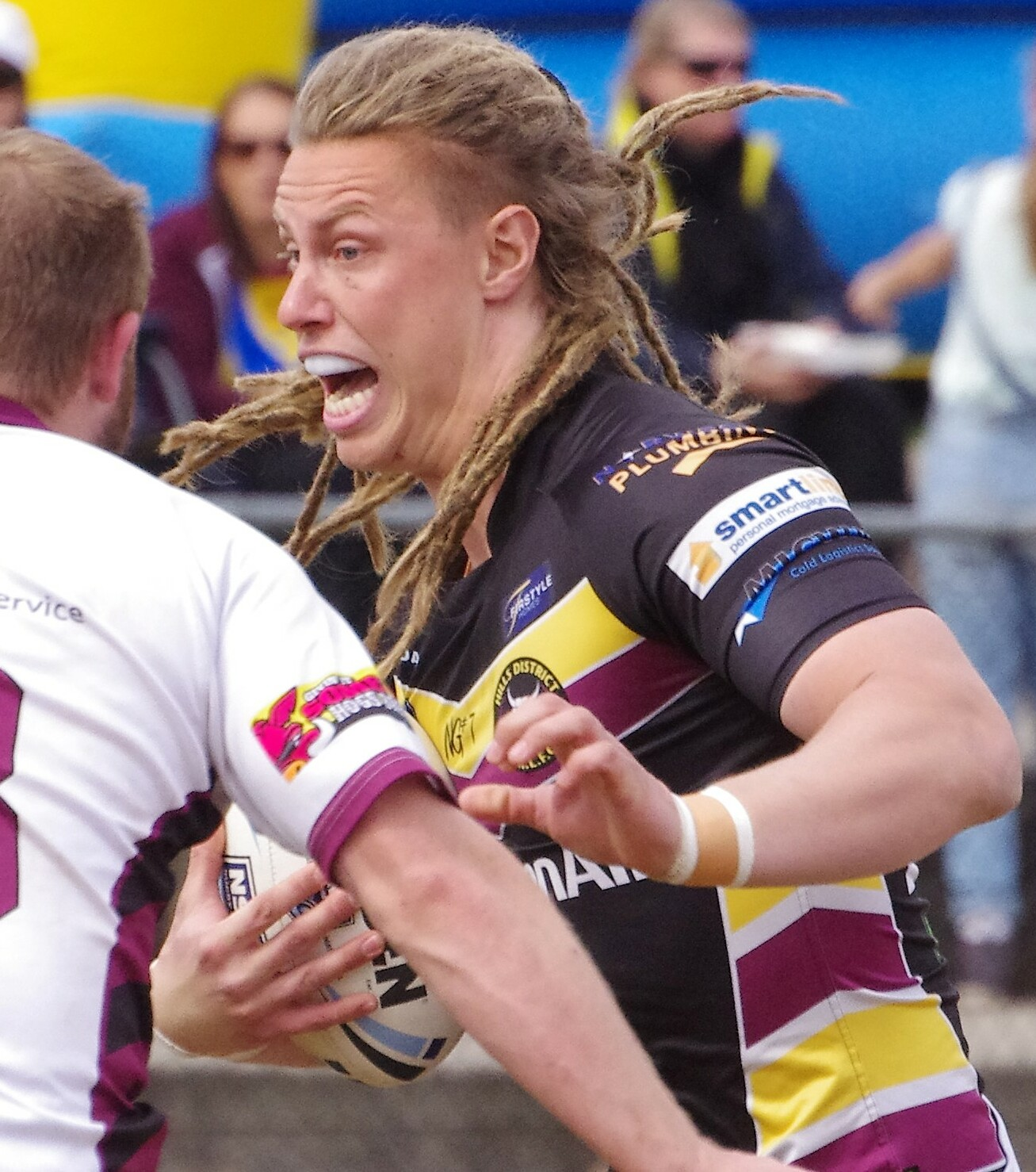

Personal information
- Born: 12 March 1990 (age 35)
- Height: 188 cm (6 ft 2 in)
- Weight: 104 kg (229 lb; 16 st 5 lb)

Playing information
- Position: Second-row, Centre
Representative
Years	Team	Pld	T	G	FG	P
2013–	Greece	8	5	0	0	20
- Source: As of 30 October 2022

Mitchell Zampetides (born 12 March 1990) is a Greece international rugby league footballer.

== Playing career ==
In 2022, Zampetides was named in the Greece squad for the 2021 Rugby League World Cup, the first ever Greek Rugby League squad to compete in a World Cup.
