= Netane Masima =

Fiji international rugby league footballer

Personal information
- Full name: Nautu'a Netane Masima
- Height: 178 cm (5 ft 10 in)
- Weight: 95 kg (14 st 13 lb)

Playing information
- Position: Halfback, Five-eighth
Representative
| Years | Team | Pld | T | G | FG | P |
|---|---|---|---|---|---|---|
| 2022– | Fiji | 1 | 0 | 1 | 0 | 2 |
- Source: As of 29 October 2026

Netane Masima is a Fiji international rugby league footballer who plays as a halfback and five-eighth for the Western Suburbs Magpies in the Ron Massey Cup.

== Background ==
He is of Fijian and Tongan descent. He represented his Tongan heritage when he played for Tonga at under-20 level in rugby union.

== Club career ==
He previously played for the Guildford Owls in the Ron Massey Cup.

== International career ==
In June 2022 Masima made his international début for the Fiji Bati side against Papua New Guinea.

In October 2022 Masima was named in the Fiji squad for the 2021 Rugby League World Cup.
