= Myles Gal =

Greece international rugby league footballer

Personal information
- Full name: Myles Gal
- Born: 21 June 2000 (age 26) Bundaberg, Queensland, Australia
- Height: 190 cm (6 ft 3 in)
- Weight: 112 kg (17 st 9 lb)

Playing information
- Position: Prop
Representative
Years	Team	Pld	T	G	FG	P
2022–	Greece	2	0	0	0	0
- Source: As of 21 October 2022

Myles Gal (born 21 June 2000) is a Greece international rugby league footballer who plays for the Sunshine Coast Falcons.

== Playing career ==
In 2022, Gal was named in the Greece squad for the 2021 Rugby League World Cup, the first ever Greek Rugby League squad to compete in a World Cup.

Gal is also eligible for Hungary through is paternal grandfather and for North Macedonia through is paternal grandmother.
