= Terry Constantinou =

Greece international rugby league footballer

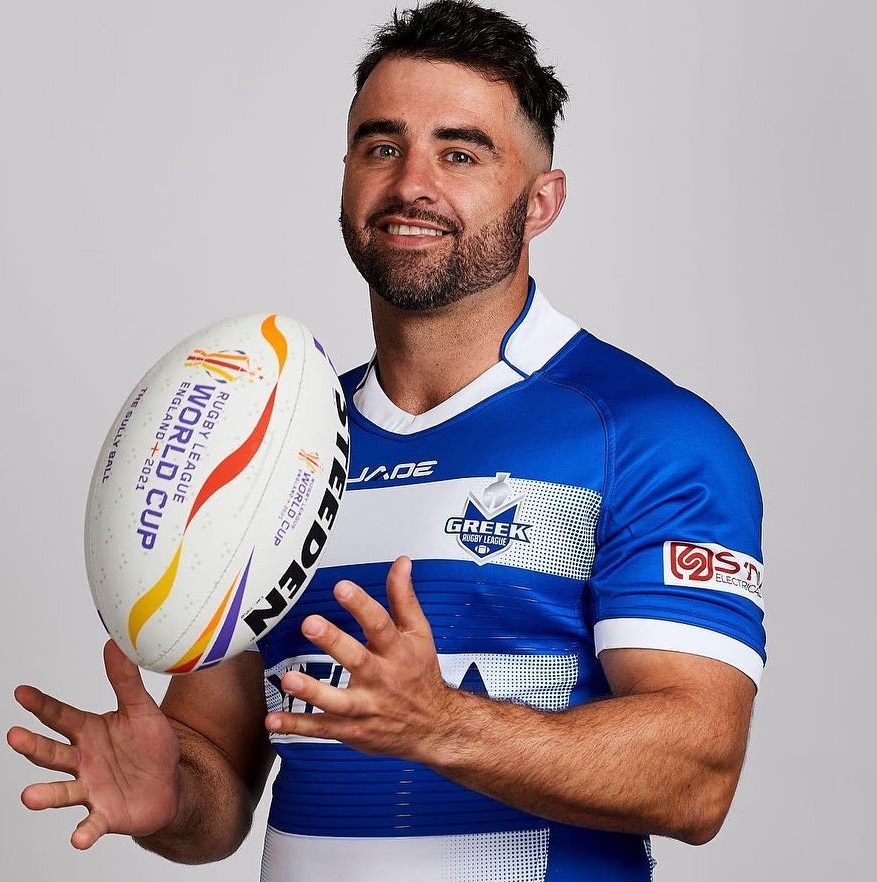

Personal information
- Full name: Terence Constantinou
- Born: 25 April 1989 (age 37) Gordon, Victoria, Australia,
- Height: 178 cm (5 ft 10 in)
- Weight: 94 kg (14 st 11 lb)

Playing information
- Position: Centre, Fullback, Second-row, Lock
Representative
Years	Team	Pld	T	G	FG	P
2013–	Greece	16	14	0	0	56
- Source: As of 30 October 2022

Terry Constantinou (born 25 April 1989) is a Greece international rugby league footballer who plays for the Sunbury Tigers.

== Early life ==
Constantinou was born in Gordon, Victoria and is of Greek descent through his paternal grandparents and his mother.

Constantinou attended Parade College in Bundoora, Victoria, graduating in the class of 2006.

== Playing career ==
Constantinou started playing Rugby League at the age of 14, making a number of Victorian Junior Representative sides and Melbourne Storm junior academy sides.

In 2013, Constantinou made his debut for the Greek side against Hungary, scoring 3 tries in their 90 - 0 win.

In 2017, Constantinou was selected in the Australian Combined Affiliated States team to play England as part of their 2017 Rugby League World Cup preparations.

In 2022, Constantinou was named in the Greece squad for the 2021 Rugby League World Cup, the first ever Greek Rugby League squad to compete in a World Cup. Terry Constantinou played in all 3 of Greece's Rugby League World Cup games against France, Samoa and England respectively. Constantinou was chosen as the captain of the Greek side for their 2nd Round match against Samoa.

In addition to his playing career, Constantinou served as an assistant coach of the Melbourne Storm SG Ball Cup side (formerly known as the Victoria Thunderbolts).
