= Liam Sue-Tin =

Greece international rugby league footballer

Personal information
- Full name: Liam Sue-Tin Kentrotis
- Born: 30 September 1992 (age 32)
- Height: 173 cm (5 ft 8 in)
- Weight: 86 kg (13 st 8 lb)

Playing information
- Position: Hooker
Representative
Years	Team	Pld	T	G	FG	P
2013–	Greece	6	0	22	0	44
- Source: As of 25 October 2022

Liam Sue-Tin is a Greece international rugby league footballer.

== Playing career ==
In 2022, Sue-Tin was named in the Greece squad for the 2021 Rugby League World Cup, the first ever Greek Rugby League squad to compete in a World Cup.
