= Michael Korkidas =

Former Greece international rugby league footballer

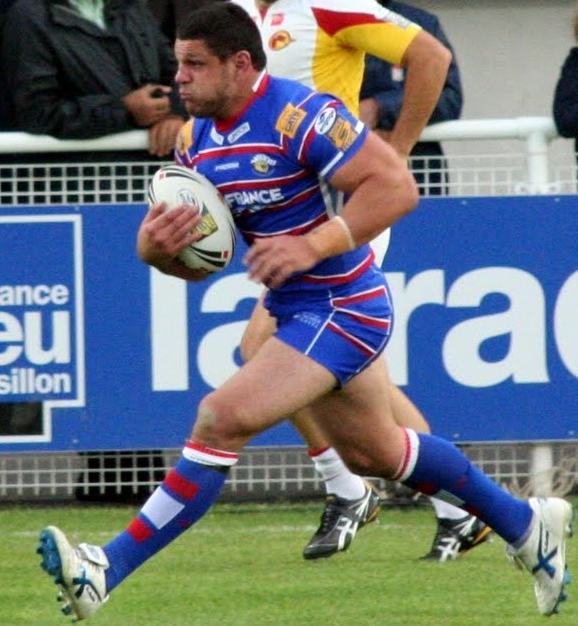

Personal information
- Born: 12 January 1981 (age 45) Sydney, New South Wales, Australia

Playing information
- Height: 1.86 m (6 ft 1 in)
- Weight: 107 kg (16 st 12 lb)
- Position: Prop
Club
Years	Team	Pld	T	G	FG	P
2001–02	Sydney Roosters	8	0	0	0	0
2003–06	Wakefield Trinity Wildcats	109	11	0	0	44
2007–08	Salford City Reds	27	1	0	0	4
2008	Castleford Tigers	22	1	0	0	4
2009	Huddersfield Giants	6	1	0	0	4
2009–11	Wakefield Trinity Wildcats	62	4	0	0	16
2012	Keighley Cougars	26	0	0	0	0
	Total	260	18	0	0	72
Representative
Years	Team	Pld	T	G	FG	P
2013–18	Greece	6	2	0	0	8

Michael Korkidas (Greek: Μιχαλης Κορκιδας; on 12 January 1981) is a former Greece international rugby league footballer who played as a prop in the NRL, the Super League and was captain of Greece.

== Background ==
Korkidas was born in Sydney, New South Wales, Australia.

== Playing career ==
=== Early Career in Australia ===
While attending Marist College Kogarah, Korkidas played for the Australian Schoolboys team in 1998.

Korkidas made his professional rugby league début for the Sydney Roosters in the NRL in Australia in 2001. He played two seasons at the club. At the end of the 2002 season, he joined up with Super League's Wakefield Trinity Wildcats.

=== Super League Career (2003 – 2012) ===
Korkidas played in the Super League from 2003 until 2012, playing for a number of clubs. These clubs are: Wakefield Trinity Wildcats (2003 – 2006), Salford City Reds (2007 – 2008), Castleford Tigers (2008), Huddersfield Giants (2009) and returning to the Wakefield Trinity Wildcats in 2009 (until 2011) and finally, the Keighley Cougars (2012 – for one season).

He signed with Huddersfield Giants on a three-year contract from 2009 after negotiating a release from Castleford for his final season. However, in late May 2009, Korkidas returned to Wakefield mid-season in a deal with both clubs. He remained at the club until the end of the 2011 season.

In October 2011, he joined his old playing colleague Jason Demetriou, at the newly promoted Keighley Cougars for the 2012 season in the Championship. At the end of the season, he retired from the Super league, and returned to Australia.

=== Return to Australia (2013 – present) ===
After his high-profile career in England, Korkidas returned to Australia in 2013 to ease off his playing career. He joined the Dapto Canaries club in 2013, a team that are playing in the Illawarra Rugby League competition. Korkidas finished his rugby league career with the club at the end of the 2014 season.

He also played for the Illawarra Cutters club in their final two games of the 2013 season. They participate in the NSW Cup, the NRL's NSW feeder competition for the St George Illawarra Dragons.

== Representative career ==
Korkidas captained Greece in the team's first official international match in 2013, a 90–0 win over Hungary.

Korkidas captained Greece for Thailand's Chang 13 first international match at King Mongkut's Institute of Technology, Ladkrabang, Bangkok, Thailand; Greece beat Thailand 90–0, 24-0 half time winning the Eurasia cup on 12 October 2013, although this was not a test-match.
