= Greece national rugby league team =

Greece

Team information
- Nickname: Titans
- Governing body: Greek Rugby League Association
- Region: Europe
- Head coach: Steve Georgallis
- Captain: Nick Mougios
- Most caps: Stefanos Bastas (22)
- Top try-scorer: Jordan Meads (16)
- Top point-scorer: Jordan Meads (132)
- IRL ranking: 15th

Uniforms
Primary colours

Team results
- First international
- New Caledonia 10–26 Greece (September 2003)
- Biggest win
- Hungary 0–90 Greece (27 October 2013)
- Biggest defeat
- Greece 4–94 England (29 October 2022)

The Greece national rugby league team (Greek: Ελλάδα εθνική ομάδα ράγκμπι λίγκ) represents Greece in rugby league. The team has been participating in international competition since 2003.

Administered by the Greek Rugby League Association since 2017, the team is coached by Steve Georgallis.

== History ==
=== Early years (2003–12) ===
Greek Rugby League was first formed in Australia by Australians with Greek heritage.

The team first played international fixtures in 2003. Greece played a warm-up match against New Caledonia in late August winning the encounter 10–26. In September of that year, the Greece national team played their debut RLIF sanctioned game against Italy in September. The game was played in Australia at Jubilee Oval, Greece losing 26–24.

In October 2005, Greece played Malta, in Australia, which they lost 24 points to 22 in front of an estimated crowd of 6,500. Greece then played a warm up match against Fiji A at OKI Jubilee Stadium in front of 1103 spectators. Fiji, who had just qualified for the 2008 Rugby League World Cup, won the match 34–12.

On 28 October 2006, Greece played Serbia in the debut international match on Greek soil. Greece, supported by Greek-heritage players from Australia, won 44–26 in front of 150 home fans of the Glyka Nera Football Club, Athens. Greece were coached by former Western Suburbs Magpies player Steve Georgallis.

Greece won their first ever Rugby League Championship in 2009, when they won the Australian Mediterranean Shield, defeating Italy in the Final 34–14. This was the first competition that the Greek side had competed in. The Greeks were captained by Wests Tigers player John Skandalis. Greece did not qualify for the 2008 Rugby League World Cup.

=== Founding of Domestic Federation (2013–16) ===
2013 saw the creation of a domestic Rugby League competition in Greece. This competition was originally governed by the Hellenic Federation of Rugby League (HFRL).

On 27 October 2013 Greece defeated Hungary 90–0 in an international match played in Budapest in front of 500 spectators. The Greek side featured a mixture of players from the Greek domestic competition (8) and Australian-based (9) players including Braith Anasta and Michael Korkidas. Anasta kicked 15 goals from 15 attempts and scored 46 points in the win.

In October 2014, Greece were crowned European Championship C champions after defeating Czech Republic in the final. This was their second international tournament victory

Later in the same month, Greece competed in the inaugural Balkans Cup tournament held in Serbia. They beat the hosts in the final to win their third international tournament, the second in over a week.

Matthew Ashill was the coach of the team for the 2015 European C/2017 Rugby League World Cup qualifying tournament and on 13 September 2015 he named a 22-man train-on squad with only domestic club players. This caused some controversy as it was a key event for the national team. He explained his decision by saying "We have a totally new plan using just domestic players who will contribute to the growth and development of the sport here".

In April 2016, the HFRL was suspended from the Rugby League European Federation (RLEF) following a year-long investigation for "wilfully acting in a manner prejudicial to the interests of the RLEF and international rugby league." The HRFL was expelled from the RLEF in August 2016 for failing to meet membership requirements.

=== New administration, 2021 World Cup qualification (2017-2019) ===
In March 2017, the Greek Rugby League Association (GRLA) was recognised by the RLEF as the official governing body for rugby league in Greece, gaining observer status. In March 2018, the GRLA were rewarded for what the RLEF described as "significant progress rebuilding the national governing body and revamping its competition structure, with the support of the Greek Australian community" by being granted affiliate status.

In September 2018, Greece began their qualification path for the 2021 Rugby League World Cup by winning the European Championship C South conference. They defeated Ukraine 28–26 at Dynamo Stadium (Kharkiv) and Malta Rugby League 60–4 at Glyka Nera Stadium, Athens.

In May 2019, Greece faced European Championship C North conference winners Norway at New River Stadium, London, in the European Championship C decider. The match served as a curtain raiser to the League 1 round 9 fixture between London Skolars and Doncaster. Greece defeated Norway 56–26 to progress to the final stages of World Cup qualifiers.

In November 2019, Greece qualified for the 2021 Rugby League World Cup after participating in the final round of European World Cup Qualifiers in Pool B with matches against Scotland and Serbia. Greece were unable to host their designated match against Scotland, as the Greek state did not recognise the Greek Rugby League Association. Instead, the match was played in London at New River Stadium on 1 November. Greece were defeated 42–24.

The remaining match in Pool B saw Greece play Serbia, with the winners advancing to the 2021 Rugby League World Cup. Greece defeated Serbia 82–6 at Makiš Stadium, Belgrade.

=== World Cup (2020-2022) ===
On 16 January 2020, Greece were drawn into Group A of the 2021 Rugby League World Cup with England, Samoa and France.

As of July 2022, the Greek state announced its recognition of the Greek Rugby League Association and that games are free to take place on home soil without intervention.

Greece started their 2021 Rugby League World Cup campaign with a 34-12 loss against France at Keepmoat Stadium, Doncaster. This was followed by a 72-4 loss against Samoa at the same venue. In their final group stage match, Greece lost to England 94-4 at Bramall Lane in Sheffield.

=== 2023 ===
In 2023, Greece participated in three Senior Internationals. In October, Greece were defeated in back-to-back international matches at Gkorytsa Field, Athens against Ukraine. In the first encounter they were defeated 38-24, and again the following day 24-12.

In November, Greece defeated Norway 36-6 at Øster Hus Arena, Stavanger.

=== 2024 ===
Greece played two internationals with players selected almost exclusively from their domestic competition. Greece were captain-coached in both fixtures by Robert Tuliatu.

In May, Greece and Norway faced off, six months after their last match, at the Agios Dimitrios Municipal Stadium in Athens. Greece won the encounter 34-26.

In December, Greece played their second international fixture of the year against Albania, who were playing their first ever international match on home soil. Greece defeated Albania 86-0 at Stadium I Vorës, Tirana.

=== 2025 ===
In February, Greece participated in the 2nd annual rugby league festival in Las Vegas. Greece and the USA Hawks were to take part in a two-match series at Silverbowl Park, however the first match was cancelled due to an issue with floodlights. Greece defeated the USA in the eventual encounter 46-10, with Nic Mougios taking over captaincy of the side.

In October, Greece played 3 more international matches. two matches as part of the 2025 Euro C Tournament in Udine, Italy, and a warm-up match in Australia against Poland.

Greece defeated Poland 38-34 at St Mary's Stadium, Sydney in the first match up of the two nations.

Greece placed second in Euro C after being defeated by Ukraine 34-6; and defeating Italy 46-14. Both matches were played at Pasian Di Prato Stadium, Udine.

=== 2026 ===
2026 saw Greece crowned champions in Euro C against Malta (who had been relegated the previous year from Euro B) and Germany (who had been promoted the previous year from Euro D).

Greece defeated Malta 20-18 at Hibernians RFC in Valetta, Malta. They then went on to secure Group C by defeating Germany 68-14 in the first international rugby league match to be played in Crete, at Elena Venizelou Stadium, Chania.

== Current squad ==
25-man squad selected v USA

Player	Club
Alex Aliu	(Greece) Rhodes Knights
Leon Bakis	(Australia) Sydney Roosters
Aris Dardamanis	(Greece) Aris Eagles
Nick Flocas	(Australia) Carina
Myles Gal	(Australia) Bundaberg Brothers
Lewis Georgalis	Unattached
Deon Iro	(Australia) Cabramatta
Jake Kambos	(Australia) Young
Aris Koulizakis	(Greece) Attica Rhinos
Eddie Markopoulos	(Australia) Cabramatta
Emmanuel Michailou	(Australia) Renown United
John Mitsias	(Australia) Young
Bill Mougios	(Australia) Kingsgrove Colts
Nick Mougios	(Australia) Ryde-Eastwood
Thodoris Nianiakas	(Australia) Waverley-Oakleigh
Kody Papa	(Australia) Hills District
Chris Slater-Raptis	(Australia) Newtown Jets
Nick Stephanou	(Greece) Attica Rhinos
Sam Stratis	(Australia) Blacktown Workers
Stefanos Totidis	(Australia) Ryde-Eastwood
Tyrone Tsagalias	(Australia) Mounties
Nectarios Tsakalos	(Greece) Athens City Raiders
Nicholas Tuliatu	(Australia) South Newcastle Lions
Rob Tuliatu	(Greece) Athens City Raiders
Mitchell Zampetides	Unattached

== Records ==
=== Most capped players ===
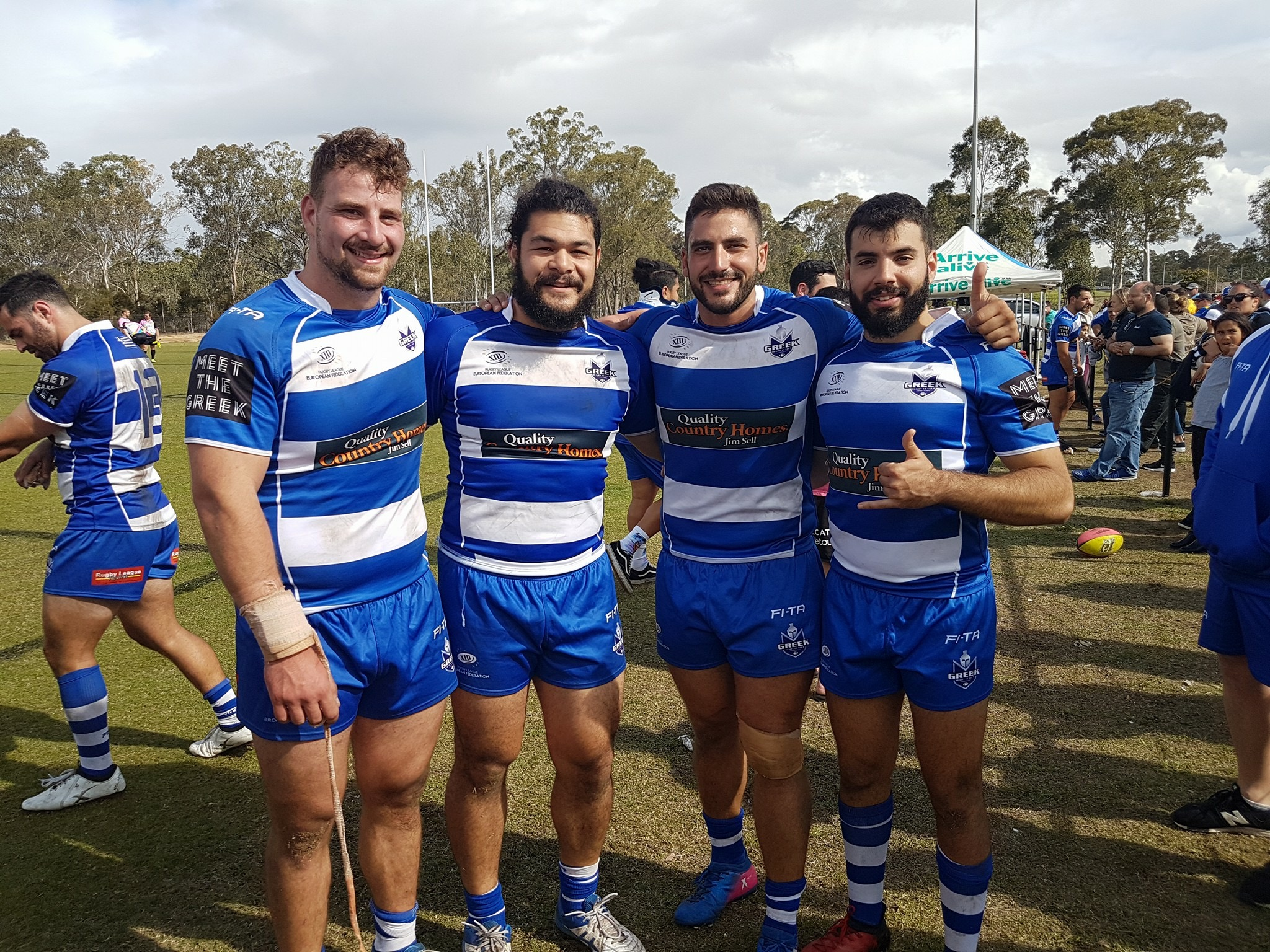
Left to Right: Bastas, Tuliatu, Rousoglou, Kartsonakis. After Emerging Nations 3rd Place Victory at St Mary's Stadium, Sydney.

#	Name	Caps
1	Stefanos Bastas	24
2	Robert Tuliatu	18
3	Ioannis Nake	16
4	Terry Constantinou	15
5	Nikolaos Bosmos	14
5	Aris Dardamanis	14
5	Konstantinos Katsidonis	14
8	Jordan Meads	13
8	Ioannis Rousoglou	13
10	Nic Mougios	12

=== Top try scorers ===
#	Name	Tries
1	Jordan Meads	19
2	Terry Constantinou	14
3	Peter Mamouzelos	10
4	Robert Tuliatu	9
5	Sam Stratis	8
6	Nikolaos Bosmos	7
6	Ioannis Nake	7
6	Eddie Markopoulos	7
6	Tyrone Tsagalias	7
10	George Chionis	6
10	Jake Vrahnos	6

=== Top point scorers ===
#	Name	Points	Tries	Goals	Field goals
1	Jordan Meads	144	19	34	0
2	Sam Stratis	116	8	42	0
3	Liam Sue-Tin	66	1	31	0
5	Terry Constantinou	56	14	0	0
5	Nikolaos Bosmos	56	7	14	0
6	Braith Anasta	46	4	15	0
7	Peter Mamouzelos	40	10	0	0
7	Tyrone Tsagalias	40	7	6	0
9	Robert Tuliatu	36	9	0	0
10	Ioannis Nake	32	7	2	0

== Competitive record ==
All-time record for Greece's national side as of 17 October 2026.

Team	First Played	Played	Win	Draw	Loss	Win %	Points For	Points Against	Point Difference	Last Played
Albania	2024	1	1	0	0	100.00	86	0	+86	2024
Bosnia and Herzegovina	2014	1	1	0	0	100.00	58	4	+54	2014
Bulgaria	2017	1	1	0	0	100.00	68	8	+60	2017
Czech Republic	2014	1	1	0	0	100.00	68	16	+52	2014
England	2022	1	0	0	1	0.00	4	94	-90	2022
France	2022	1	0	0	1	0.00	12	34	-22	2022
Germany	2026	1	1	0	0	100.00	68	14	+54	2026
Hungary	2013	3	2	0	1	66.67	134	38	+96	2018
Italy	2003	3	1	0	2	33.33	72	98	-26	2009
Japan	2016	1	1	0	0	100.00	72	0	+72	2016
Malta	2005	5	3	0	2	60.00	134	94	+40	2026
New Caledonia	2003	2	2	0	0	100.00	82	18	+64	2004
Niue	2018	1	0	0	1	0.00	8	16	-8	2018
Norway	2019	3	3	0	0	100.00	126	58	+70	2024
Poland	2025	1	1	0	0	100.00	38	34	+4	2025
Portugal	2009	1	1	0	0	100.00	42	16	+26	2009
Samoa	2022	1	0	0	1	0.00	4	72	-68	2022
Scotland	2019	1	0	0	1	0.00	24	42	-18	2019
Serbia	2006	5	3	0	2	60.00	190	144	+46	2023
Spain	2014	1	0	0	1	0.00	4	76	-72	2014
Turkey	2019	1	1	0	0	100.00	38	24	+14	2019
Ukraine	2018	4	1	0	3	25.00	70	122	-52	2025
United States	2025	1	1	0	0	100.00	46	10	+36	2025
Vanuatu	2012	2	2	0	0	100.00	64	14	+50	2018
Total		43	27	0	16	64.37%	1512	1046	+466	

A red box around the year indicates tournaments played within Greece

=== World Cup ===
World Cup record
Year	Round	Position	Pld	W	D	L	PF	PA
(France) 1954	Not involved in qualifying							
(Australia) 1957	Not involved in qualifying							
(United Kingdom) 1960	Not involved in qualifying							
(Australia) (New Zealand) 1968	Not involved in qualifying							
(United Kingdom) 1970	Not involved in qualifying							
(France) 1972	Not involved in qualifying							
1975	Not involved in qualifying							
(Australia) (New Zealand) 1977	Not involved in qualifying							
1985–88	Not involved in qualifying							
1989–92	Not involved in qualifying							
(United Kingdom) 1995	Not involved in qualifying							
(France) (United Kingdom) 2000	Not involved in qualifying							
(Australia) 2008	Not involved in qualifying							
(England) (Wales) 2013	Not involved in qualifying							
(Australia) (New Zealand) 2017	Failed to Qualify							
(England) 2021	Group stage	TBD/4	2	0	0	2	TBD	TBD
Total	0 Titles	0/13	0	0	0	0		

=== Balkans Cup ===
Balkans Cup
Year	Round	Position	GP	W	L	D
(Serbia) 2014	Champions	1/4	2	2	0	0
(Serbia) 2017	Second place	2/3	2	1	1	0
Total	1 Title	1/2	4	3	1	0

=== Australian Mediterranean Shield ===
- The Australian Mediterranean Shield tournament is a tournament involving affiliate and observer European nations competing against each other for more international rugby league experience. Greece beat Portugal by 42-16 and therefore advanced to the final to take on Italy. They won the final by a score of 34–14 to be crowned the champions, the country's first International rugby league title.

Australian Mediterranean Shield
Year	Round	Position	GP	W	L	D
(Australia) 2009	Champions	1/4	2	2	0	0
Total	1 Title	1/?	2	2	0	0

=== Emerging Nations World Championship ===
World Cup record
Year	Round	Position	GP	W	L	D
(Australia) 2018	3rd Place	3/13	4	2	2	0
Total	0 Titles	3/13	4	2	2	0

=== European Championship B ===
European Championship B
Year	Round	Position	GP	W	L	D
(Russia) (Greece) (Serbia) 2020	Qualified					
Total	0 Titles	0/3	0	0	0	0

=== European Championship C ===
European Championship C
Year	Round	Position	GP	W	L	D
(Estonia) (Latvia) 2008	Not Invited					
(Latvia) (Estonia) 2009	Not Invited					
(Malta) 2010	Not invited					
(Hungary) 2011	Not invited					
(Czech Republic) 2012	Not invited					
(Ukraine) (Norway) (Czech Republic) 2013	Not invited					
(Malta) (Czech Republic) (Greece) 2014	Champions	1/3	2	2	0	0
(Spain) (Malta) (Greece) 2015	3rd place	3/3	2	0	2	0
(Ukraine) (Czech Republic) 2016	Not invited					
(Ukraine) (Czech Republic) (Greece) (Malta) (Norway) (Germany) 2018	Champions	1/6	4	4	0	0
(Ukraine) (Greece) (Italy) 2025	2nd Place	2/3	2	1	1	0
(Greece) (Malta) (Germany) 2026	Champions	1/3	2	2	0	0
Total	3 Titles		12	9	3	0

== IRL Rankings ==
IRL Men's World Rankings
Official rankings as of August 2026
Rank	Change	Team	Pts %
1	Steady	Australia	100
2	Steady	New Zealand	82
3	Steady	England	70
4	Steady	Samoa	56
5	Steady	Tonga	54
6	Steady	Papua New Guinea	47
7	Steady	Fiji	34
8	▲1	Cook Islands	24
9	▲2	Netherlands	23
10	▲2	Ukraine	21
11	▼3	France	21
12	▼2	Serbia	20
13	Steady	Wales	18
14	Steady	Ireland	17
15	Steady	Greece	14
16	Steady	Malta	14
17	▲12	Canada	13
18	▼1	Italy	11
19	▼1	Jamaica	9
20	▲7	Scotland	8
21	▲1	United States	8
22	▼3	Poland	7
23	▼3	Lebanon	7
24	▼1	Germany	7
25	▼1	Czech Republic	6
26	▼5	Norway	6
27	▼2	Chile	5
28	▲2	Philippines	5
29	▼1	South Africa	4
30	Steady	Brazil	3
31	Steady	Morocco	3
32	▲1	Argentina	3
33	▲2	Ghana	2
34	▲2	Kenya	2
35	▼1	Montenegro	2
36	▲1	Nigeria	2
37	▼5	North Macedonia	1
38	Steady	Albania	1
39	Steady	Turkey	1
40	Steady	Bulgaria	1
41	Steady	Cameroon	0
42	Steady	Japan	0
43	Steady	Spain	0
44	Steady	Colombia	0
45	Steady	Russia	0
46	Steady	El Salvador	0
47	Steady	Bosnia and Herzegovina	0
48	Steady	Hong Kong	0
49	Steady	Solomon Islands	0
50	Steady	Vanuatu	0
51	Steady	Hungary	0
52	Steady	Latvia	0
53	Steady	Denmark	0
54	Steady	Belgium	0
55	Steady	Estonia	0
56	Steady	Sweden	0
57	Steady	Niue	0
Complete rankings at www.internationalrugbyleague.com

== See also ==
- Rugby league in Greece
- Greece national rugby league team (women)
- Greek Rugby League Association
- Hellas Rugby League Federation
