= Aris Dardamanis =

Greece international rugby league footballer

Personal information
- Full name: Aris Konstantinos Dardamanis
- Born: 20 November 1986 (age 38)
- Height: 177 cm (5 ft 10 in)
- Weight: 96 kg (15 st 2 lb)

Playing information
- Position: Hooker, Lock
Representative
Years	Team	Pld	T	G	FG	P
2014–	Greece	8	3	5	0	22
- Source: As of 8 November 2025

Aris Dardamanis (born 20 November 1986) (Greek: Άρης Δαρδαμάνης) is a Greece international rugby league footballer who plays for the Aris Eagles.

== Playing career ==
Aris start playing rugby league in 2013. In 2022, Dardamanis was named in the Greece squad for the 2021 Rugby League World Cup, the first ever Greek Rugby League squad to compete in a World Cup.
