= Nick Flocas =

Greece international rugby league footballer

Personal information
- Full name: Nicholas Flocas
- Born: 13 June 1999 (age 26); Melbourne, Victoria, Australia
- Height: 184 cm (6 ft 0 in)
- Weight: 101 kg (15 st 13 lb)

Playing information
- Position: Lock, Second-row
Representative
Years	Team	Pld	T	G	FG	P
2022–	Greece	3	0	0	0	0
- Source: As of 30 October 2022

Nick Flocas (born 13 June 1999) is a Greece international rugby league footballer who plays for the Ipswich Jets in the Queensland Cup and the Fassifern Bombers in Ipswich Rugby League.

== Playing career ==
In 2022, Flocas was named in the Greece squad for the 2021 Rugby League World Cup, the first ever Greek Rugby League squad to compete in a World Cup.
