= John Mitsias =

Greece international rugby league footballer

Johnny Mitsias
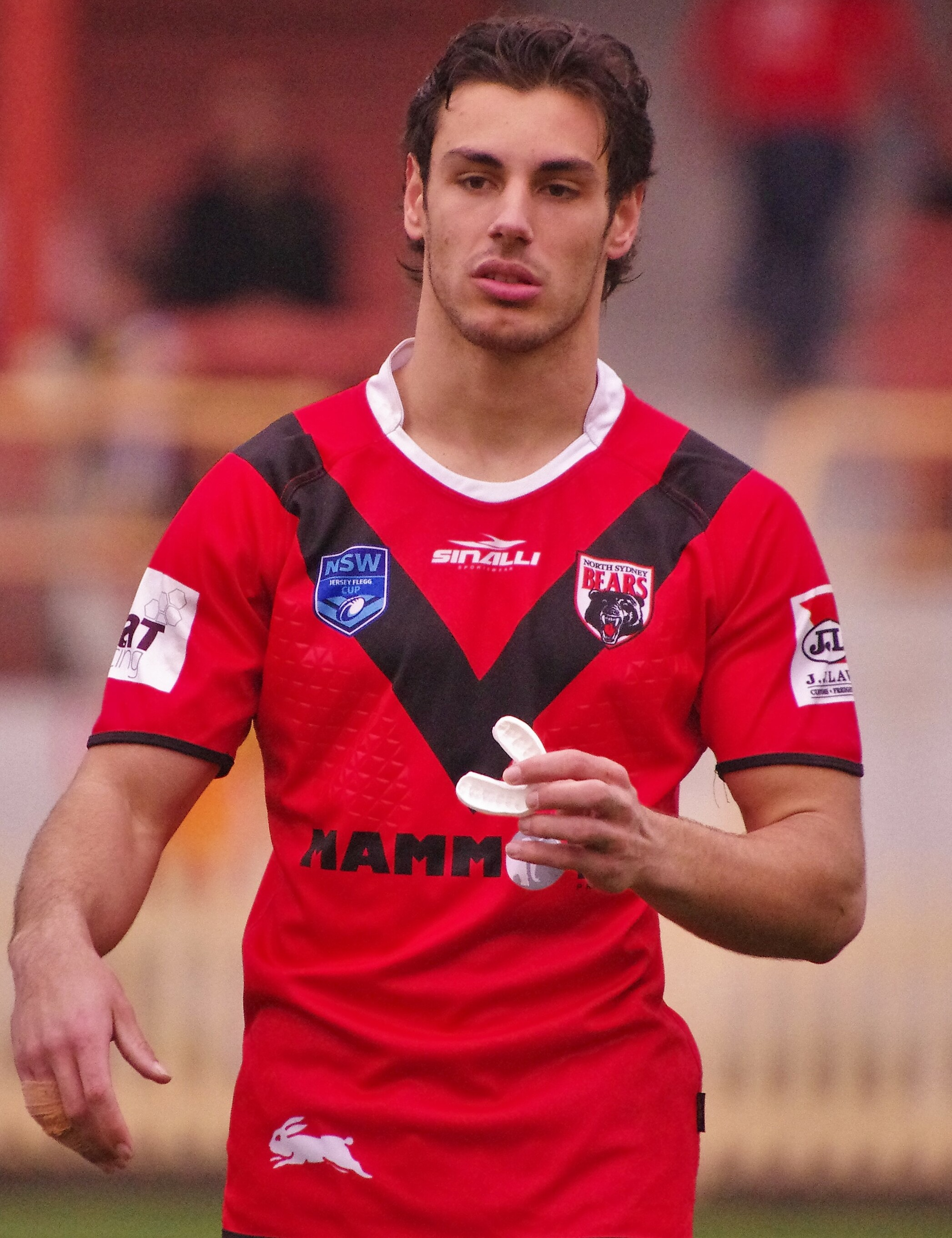

Personal information
- Full name: Johnathan Mitsias
- Born: 1999 (age 26–27) Australia
- Height: 185 cm (6 ft 1 in)
- Weight: 89 kg (14 st 0 lb)

Playing information
- Position: Fullback, Centre, Wing
Club
Years	Team	Pld	T	G	FG	P
2024–	Batley Bulldogs	19	3	0	0	0
Representative
Years	Team	Pld	T	G	FG	P
2019–	Greece	6	4	0	0	8
- Source: As of 14 October 2025

Johnny Mitsias is a Greece international rugby league footballer who plays as a winger for the Batley Bulldogs in the RFL Championship.

== Background ==
Mitsias was born in Australia and is of Greek heritage.

== Playing career ==
In 2022, Mitsias was named in the Greece squad for the 2021 Rugby League World Cup, the first ever Greek Rugby League squad to compete in a World Cup. In February 2024 it was reported that he had signed for Batley Bulldogs in the RFL Championship.

== International career ==
He represented Greece in their 2025 test match against the USA, which Greece won 46-10, with Mitsias scoring two tries in the victory.
