= Nick Mougios =

Greece international rugby league footballer

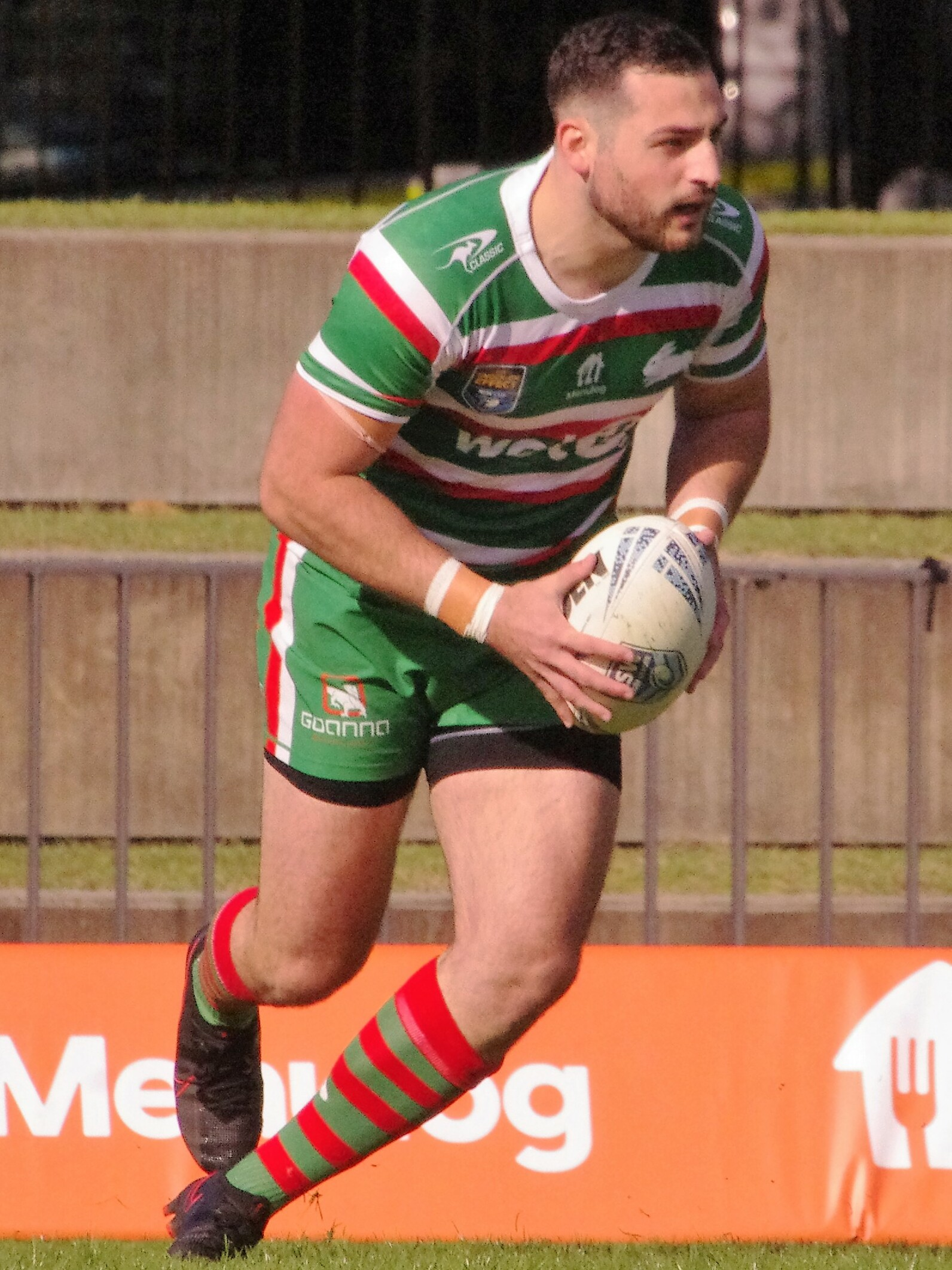

Personal information
- Born: 26 January 1999 (age 27) Sydney, New South Wales, Australia
- Height: 184 cm (6 ft 0 in)
- Weight: 95 kg (14 st 13 lb)

Playing information
- Position: Wing, Five-eighth, Fullback
Representative
Years	Team	Pld	T	G	FG	P
2018–	Greece	13	5	0	0	12
- Source: As of 30 October 2022

Nick Mougios (born 26 January 1999) is a Greece international rugby league footballer who plays as a Centre, Wing for the South Sydney Rabbitohs in the NSW Cup.

== Playing career ==
In 2022, Mougios was named in the Greece squad for the 2021 Rugby League World Cup, the first ever Greek Rugby League squad to compete in a World Cup.
