= Charlie Emslie =

Scotland international rugby league footballer

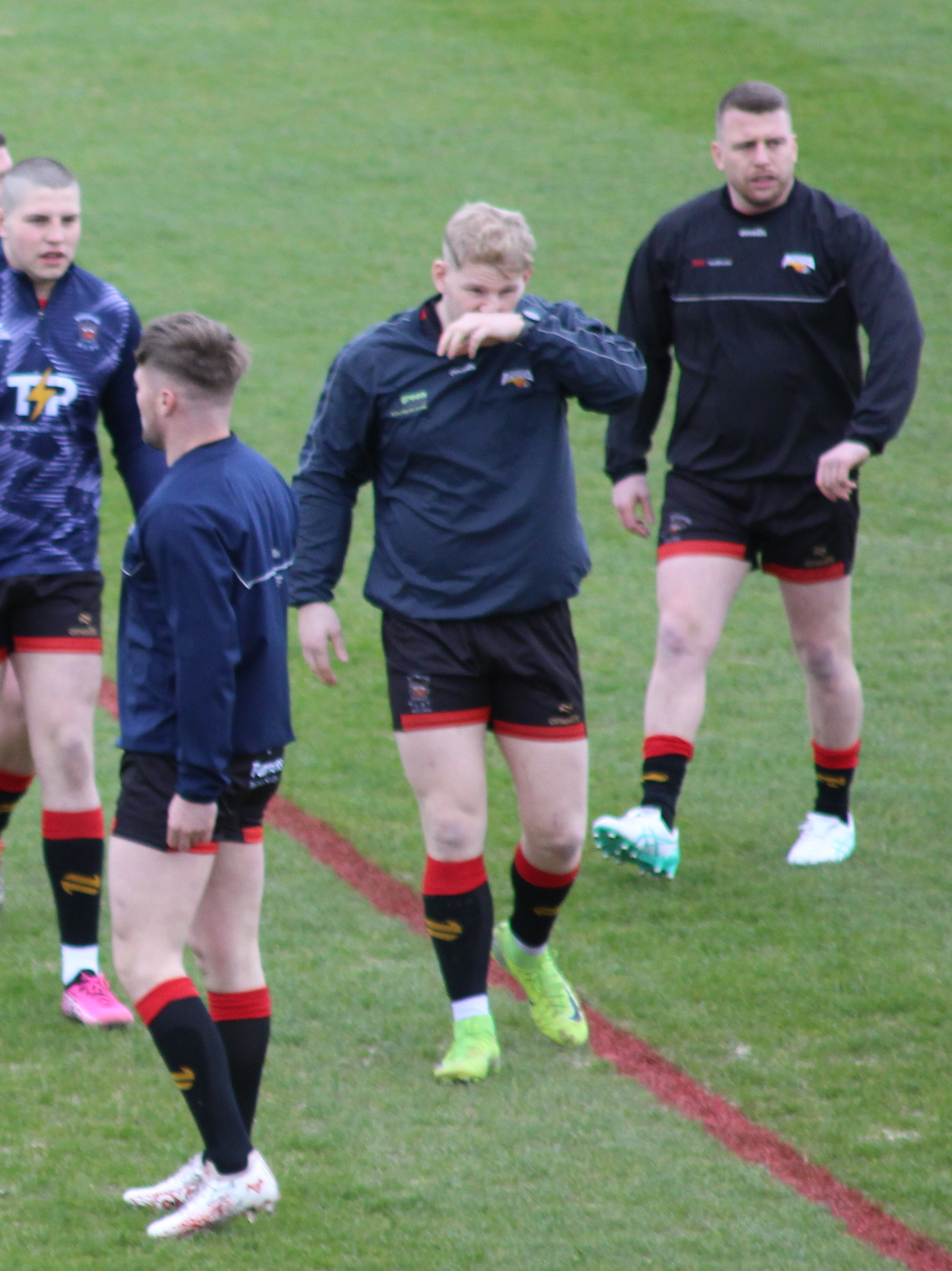

Personal information
- Full name: Charlie Emslie
- Born: 30 October 2000 (age 25) Lancaster, Lancashire, England
- Height: 6 ft 1 in (1.86 m)
- Weight: 15 st 10 lb (100 kg)

Playing information
- Position: Second-row
Club
Years	Team	Pld	T	G	FG	P
2021–	Barrow Raiders	90	8	0	0	32
Representative
Years	Team	Pld	T	G	FG	P
2021–	Scotland	5	2	0	0	8
- Source: As of 26 October 2026

Charlie Emslie (born 30 October 2000) is a Scotland international rugby league footballer who plays as a second-row forward for semi-professional side Barrow Raiders in the Championship.

== Background ==
Emslie was born in Lancaster, Lancashire, England. He is of Scottish heritage.

He was educated at Furness College.

== Playing career ==
=== Club career ===
Emslie joined Barrow Raiders as a youth and was later rewarded with a deal from the 2021 season.

=== International career ===
Emslie played for the Scotland students side. He also played for Scotland under 19s.

He made his international debut for Scotland in 2021, scoring two tries against Jamaica.

In 2022 Emslie was named in the Scotland squad for the 2021 Rugby League World Cup.
