= Jake Kambos =

Greece international rugby league footballer

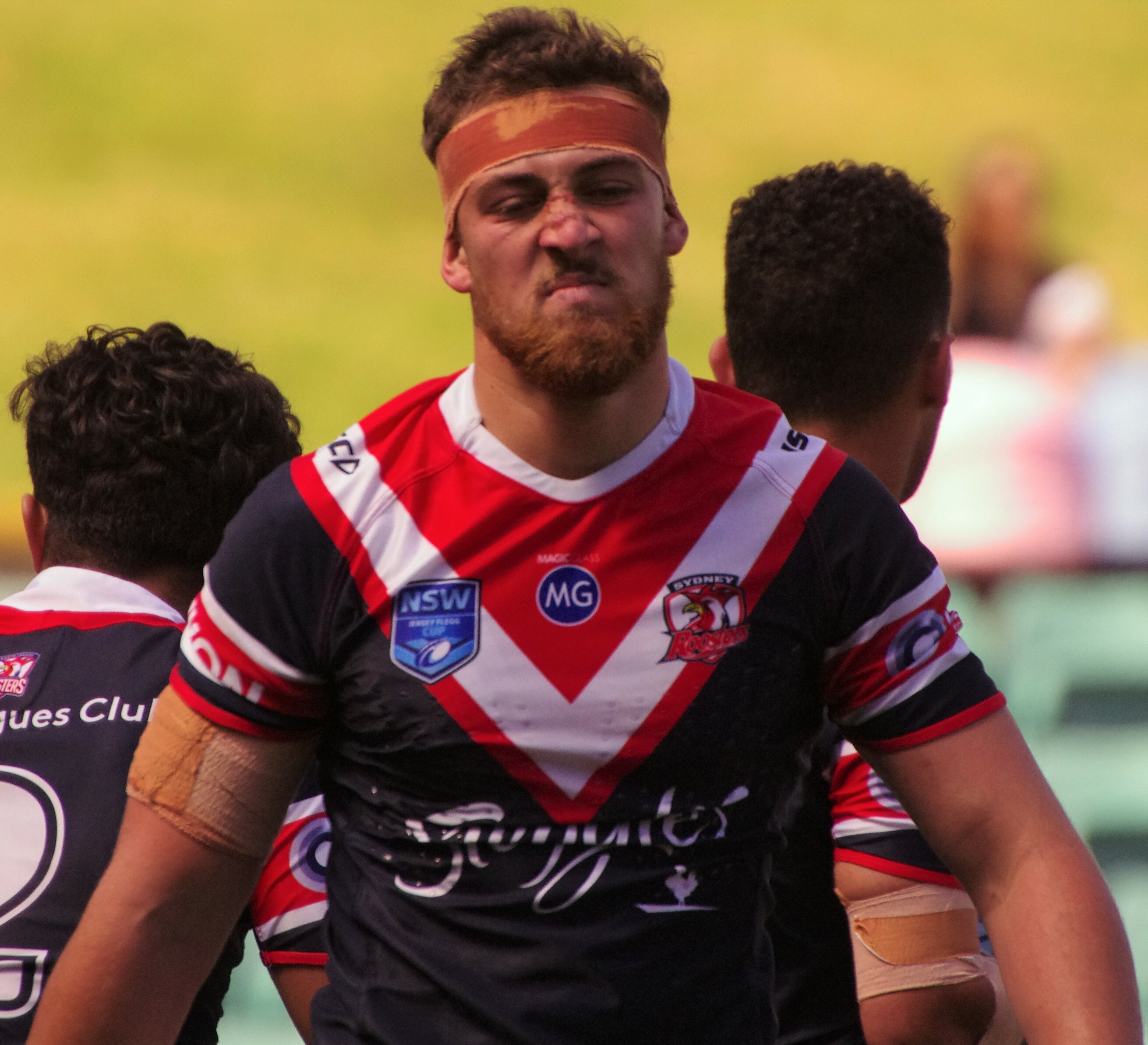

Personal information
- Full name: Jake Kambos
- Born: 24 May 1999 (age 25)
- Height: 190 cm (6 ft 3 in)
- Weight: 102 kg (225 lb; 16 st 1 lb)

Playing information
- Position: Second-row, Loose forward
Representative
Years	Team	Pld	T	G	FG	P
2019–	Greece	5	2	0	0	8
- Source: As of 30 October 2022

Jake Kambos (born 24 May 1999) is a Greece international rugby league footballer.

== Playing career ==
In 2022, Kambos was named in the Greece squad for the 2021 Rugby League World Cup, the first ever Greek Rugby League squad to compete in a World Cup.
