= Ioannis Nake =

Greece international rugby league footballer (born 1990)

Ioannis 'Johny' Nake
Personal information
- Full name: Ioannis Nake
- Born: 6 October 1990 (age 35) Bilisht, Albania
- Height: 170 cm (5 ft 7 in)
- Weight: 70 kg (154 lb; 11 st 0 lb)

Playing information
- Position: Hooker
Representative
Years	Team	Pld	T	G	FG	P
2013–	Greece	11	5	1	0	22
- Source: As of 8 November 2025

Ioannis Nake (born 6 October 1990) is a Greece international rugby league footballer who plays for the Attica Rhinos.

== Playing career ==
In 2022, Nake was named in the Greece squad for the 2021 Rugby League World Cup, the first ever Greek Rugby League squad to compete in a World Cup.
