= Theodoros Nianiakas =

Greece international rugby league footballer

Personal information
- Full name: Theodoros Nianiakas
- Born: 25 August 1995 (age 29)
- Height: 193 cm (6 ft 4 in)
- Weight: 106 kg (16 st 10 lb)

Playing information
- Position: Second-row, Lock
Representative
Years	Team	Pld	T	G	FG	P
2019–	Greece	6	2	0	0	8
- Source: As of 30 October 2022

Theodoros Nianiakas (born 25 August 1995) is a Greece international rugby league footballer who plays for the Woolston Rovers.

== Playing career ==
In 2022, Nianiakas was named in the Greece squad for the 2021 Rugby League World Cup, the first ever Greek Rugby League squad to compete in a World Cup.
