= Kaylen Miller =

Fiji international rugby league footballer

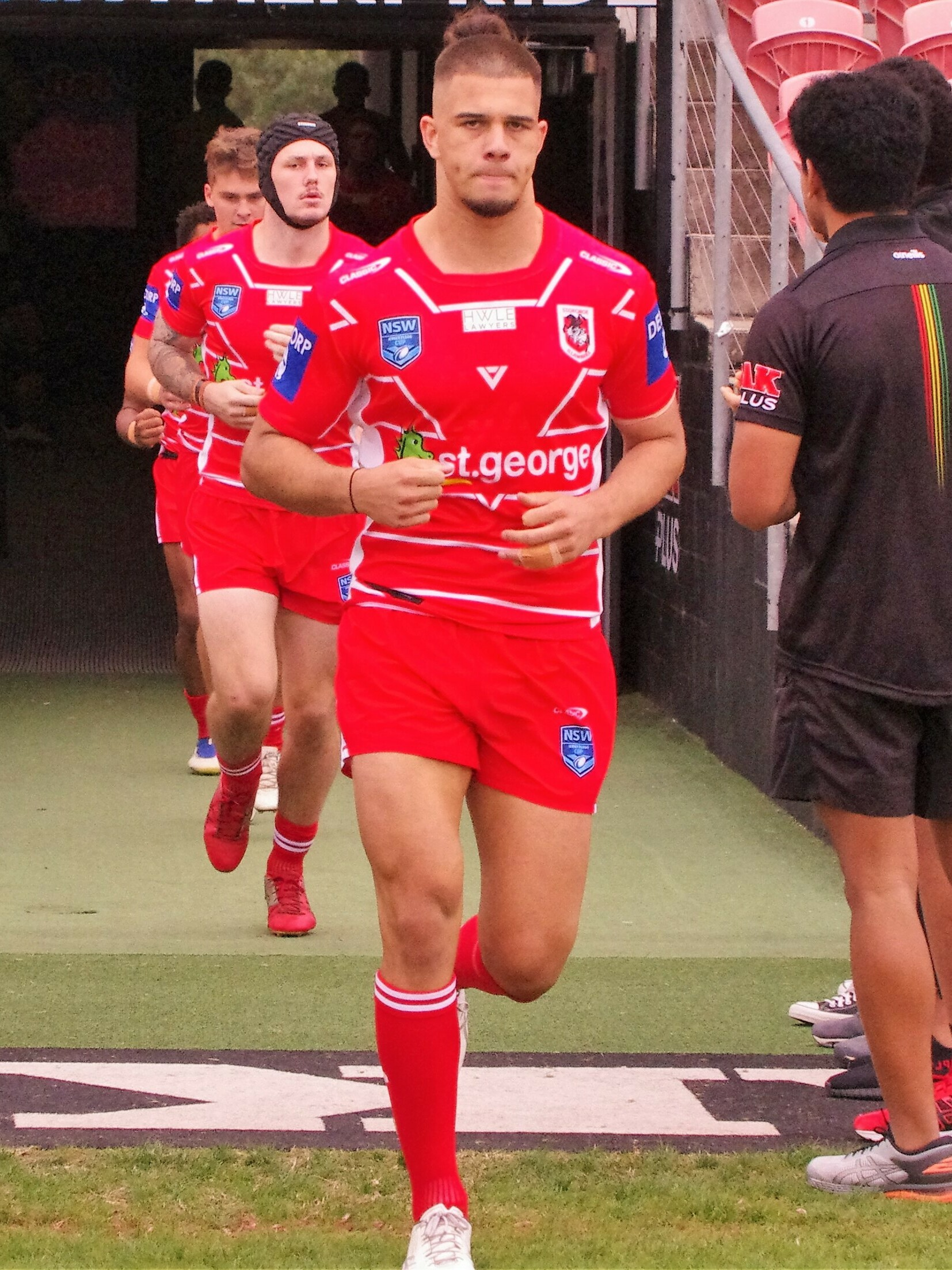

Personal information
- Full name: Kaylen Miller
- Born: 3 August 2000 (age 26)

Playing information
- Position: Second-row
Representative
Years	Team	Pld	T	G	FG	P
2022–	Fiji	1	0	0	0	0
- Source: As of 9 October 2022

Kaylen Miller (born 3 August 2000) is a Fijian international rugby league footballer who plays as a second-row forward for the Saint-Gaudens XIII in the French Competition Elite 1 and Fiji at international level.

== Background ==
Miller has ancestry from Somosomo, Fiji.

== Club career ==
Miller previously played for the Bulls and the St. George Illawarra Dragons, The South Sydney Rabbitohs in the Knock On Effect NSW Cup and for the Mount Pritchard Mounties in the Ron Massey Cup.

He is currently playing for French club Saint-Gaudens XIII in the French Elite 1.

== International career ==
On 25 Jun 2022 Miller made his international début for the Fiji Bati side against Papua New Guinea to be Fiji Bati number 246.

In October 2022 Miller was named in the Fiji squad for the 2021 Rugby League World Cup.
