= Rob Tuliatu =

Greece international rugby league footballer

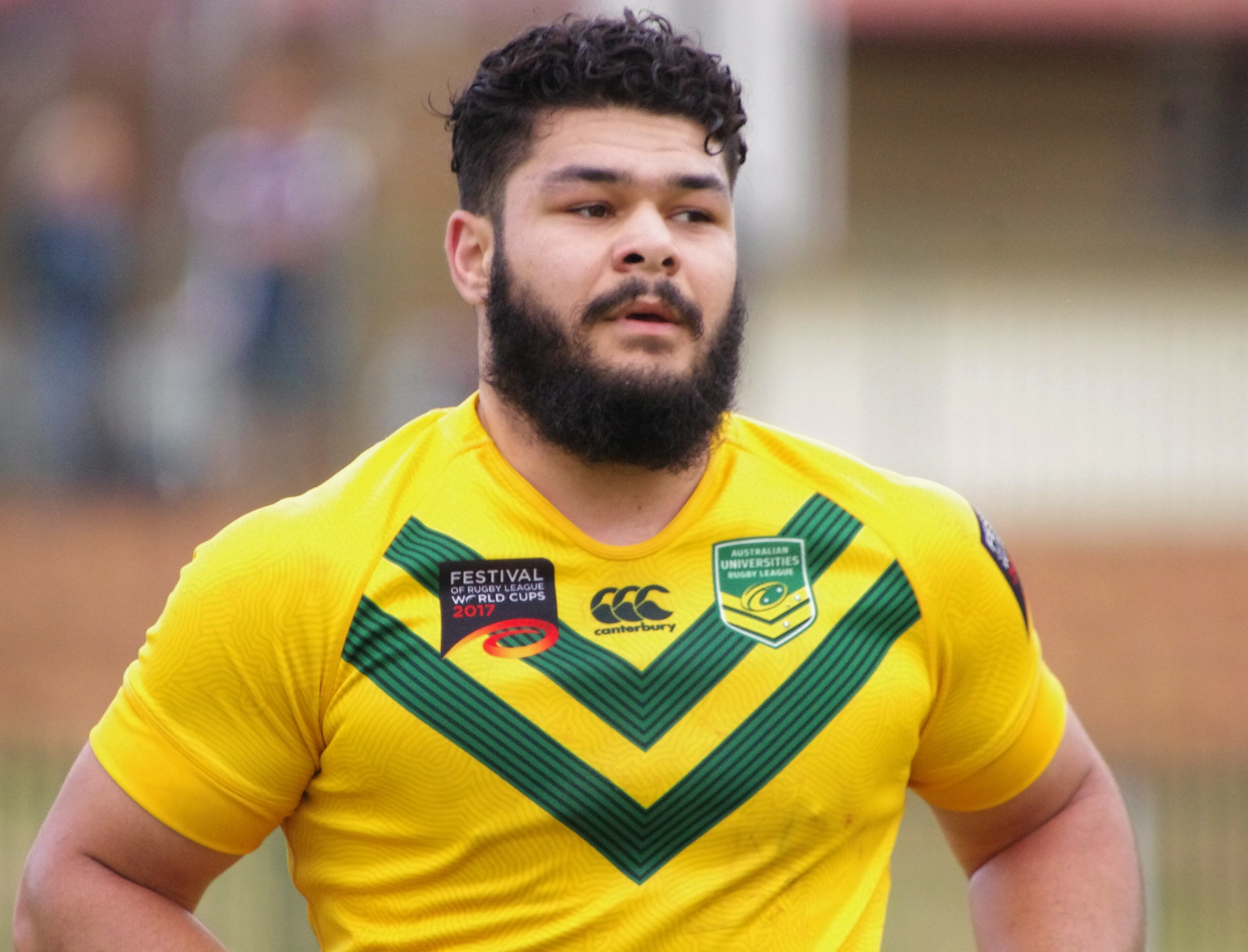

Personal information
- Full name: Robert Tuliatu
- Born: 11 October 1995 (age 31) Sydney, New South Wales, Australia
- Height: 6 ft 0 in (1.84 m)
- Weight: 17 st 5 lb (110 kg)

Playing information
- Position: Prop, Lock, Second Row
Club
Years	Team	Pld	T	G	FG	P
2019	West Wales Raiders	5	1	0	0	4
2019	London Skolars	12	0	0	0	0
2022	London Broncos	20	0	0	0	0
2022(loan)	→ London Skolars	1	1	0	0	4
2023	Newcastle Thunder	25	1	0	0	4
2023–	SO Avignon	20	5	0	0	20
	Total	83	8	0	0	32
Representative
Years	Team	Pld	T	G	FG	P
2018–	Greece	18	9	0	0	36
- Source: As of 22 October 2026

Robert Tuliatu (born 11 October 1995) is a Greece international rugby league footballer who plays as a prop or second row for Sporting Olympique Avignon in the Elite 1.

He previously played for Newcastle Thunder and the London Broncos in the Championship and the West Wales Raiders and the London Skolars in League 1.

== Background ==
Tuliatu was born in Sydney, New South Wales, Australia, to a Samoan father and Greek mother.

He graduated from Macquarie University with a Bachelor of Arts with Bachelor of Laws and a Full Blue.

He is a qualified solicitor.

== Playing career ==
=== Club career ===
He played junior rugby league for the Cessnock Goannas. He came through the youth system at the Newcastle Knights.

He later played for the Newcastle Rebels and the Australian Universities side.

Tuliatu played in the Ron Massey Cup for the Mount Pritchard Mounties and the Asquith Magpies.

In 2019 he played for the West Wales Raiders in League 1.

Later in 2019 he joined the London Skolars in the same competition in a mid-season transfer.

He played for the Cessnock Goannas and won the premiership with them in 2020.

He joined the London Broncos at the start of the 2022 season. He also played one match on loan from the Broncos at the Skolars in League 1.

He joined Newcastle Thunder at the start of the 2023 season, going on to make 25 appearances.

At the end of the 2023 Championship season, Tuliatu joined Sporting Olympique Avignon. In December, Tuliatu was named by Treize Mondial in their Elite 1 team of the mid-season.

=== International career ===
In 2018 Tuliatu made his international début for Greece against Ukraine.

He was also selected for the 2018 Emerging Nations World Championship and Greece's World Cup Qualification squad.

In 2022 Tuliatu was named in the Greece squad for the 2021 Rugby League World Cup, the first Greek Rugby League squad to compete in a World Cup.
