= World Rugby League =

- Abbreviation: WRL
- Formation: 2016
- Type: Federation of national associations
- Headquarters: Argentina
- Region served: Europe, Asia, Americas
- Chairman: Pantazidis Anastasios
- Secretary General: Pierluigi Gentile
- Americas' Director: Carlos Varela
- Website: www.worldrugbyleague.org

World Rugby League is based in Argentina. It is a confederation of recognised national Federations. F.e. Lega Italiana Rugby Football League is recognised by CONI.

It was formed in 2016 after a meeting between non-RLIF recognised Rugby League Federations in Florence. The first Assembly took place in Athens, in 2017.
