= Tom Hopkins (rugby league) =

Wales international rugby league footballer

Personal information
- Full name: Thomas Hopkins
- Born: 21 December 1992 (age 33) Cumbria, England

Playing information
- Position: Second-row
Club
Years	Team	Pld	T	G	FG	P
2020–23	Barrow Raiders	36	2	0	0	8
Representative
Years	Team	Pld	T	G	FG	P
2022–	Wales	3	0	0	0	0
- Source: As of 16 May 2023

Tom Hopkins (born 21 December 1992) is a Wales international rugby league footballer who last played as a second-row forward for the Barrow Raiders in the Championship.

== Background ==
Hopkins was born in England and is of Welsh descent.

== Playing career ==
=== Club career ===
Hopkins played for Askam as an amateur.

He joined the Barrow Raiders ahead of the 2020 season.

=== International career ===
Hopkins represented BARLA on tour in 2018.

He made his Wales debut in June 2022 against France at the Stadium Municipal d'Albi in Albi.

In 2022 Hopkins was named in the Wales squad for the 2021 Rugby League World Cup.
