= Davey Dixon =

Scotland international rugby league footballer

Personal information
- Full name: David Dixon
- Born: 31 May 1997 (age 27); Leeds, West Yorkshire, England

Playing information
- Position: Wing, Centre, Fullback
Club
Years	Team	Pld	T	G	FG	P
2016–19	Keighley Cougars	50	16	0	0	64
2020–24	Dewsbury Rams	33	7	0	0	28
2024	Midlands Hurricanes	1	0	0	0	0
	Total	84	23	0	0	92
Representative
Years	Team	Pld	T	G	FG	P
2018–2024	Scotland	7	3	0	0	12
- Source: As of 11 Aug 2024

Davey Dixon (born 31 May 1997) is a former Scotland international rugby league player who played as a winger.

== Background ==
Davey Dixon was born in Leeds, West Yorkshire, England.

== Playing career ==
=== Featherstone Rovers ===
Dixon's professional career started with Featherstone Rovers who he joined as a 16-year old but he moved to Warrington Wolves to play at academy level and then Castleford Tigers where he was a member of the under-19 squad and was named "best improved player" in 2016.

=== Keighley Cougars ===
At the end of the 2016 season Dixon signed for Keighley Cougars for whom he played through three seasons (2017–2019) scoring 16 tries in 50 appearances.

=== Dewsbury Rams ===
Released by Keighley at the end of the 2019 season, Dixon joined Dewsbury on a one-year contract in October 2019.

=== Midlands Hurricanes ===
On 13 June 2024 it was reported that he had joined Midlands Hurricanes in the RFL League 1 on a deal until 2025.

=== International ===
In 2017 Dixon was given his first taste of international rugby when he played for the Scottish under-19 team that lost 24–7 to Scottish Students. Selected for the initial 30 strong Scotland squad for the 2017 World Cup, Dixon did not get picked for the team that went to the tournament but did go to Australia in February 2018 as part of the Scottish under-23 team that finished fifth in the Rugby League Commonwealth Championship nines tournament. Dixon scored three tries including a decisive try in the Shield final against Wales.

A first full appearances for the Scottish national team came in October 2018 when Dixon played in the 26–10 defeat by Ireland in the 2018 Rugby League European Championship. A first international try came in his second game when he opened the scoring in the 12–50 loss to Wales.
