= Stefanos Bastas =

Greece rugby league footballer (born 1993)

Personal information
- Born: 22 December 1993 (age 32) Karystos, Euboea, Greece
- Height: 187 cm (6 ft 2 in)
- Weight: 111 kg (17 st 7 lb)

Playing information
- Position: Prop, Lock
Club
Years	Team	Pld	T	G	FG	P
2018	Hemel Stags	12	0	0	0	0
2019	Doncaster	9	2	0	0	8
2019–20	Villegailhenc-Aragon	5	0	0	0	0
2021	Saint-Gaudens Bears	3	0	0	0	0
2021	Coventry Bears	3	0	0	0	0
2022–	Rhodes Knights	28	7	0	0	28
	Total	60	9	0	0	36
Representative
Years	Team	Pld	T	G	FG	P
2014–	Greece	22	1	1	0	6
- Source: As of 22 October 2026

Stefanos Bastas (Greek: Στέφανος Μπάστας) is a Greek semi-professional rugby league footballer who plays as a prop for Rhodes Knights in Greece. He began playing rugby league at the age of 18 in Greece with the Rhodes Knights. As of 2021, he is the most capped player for the Greek National Rugby League Team.

== Career ==
=== Hemel Stags ===
Upon returning from Serbia, Bastas moved to England in search of a professional contract. He attended trials and training sessions with the Hemel Stags, where he was successful and signed a one-year contract for the 2018 season. He was the first ever Greek rugby league player to secure a professional contract.

=== Doncaster RLFC ===
In 2019, following a series of trial games, Stefanos signed for Doncaster. He then scored his first ever try in Doncaster's 46-6 Challenge Cup win over Featherstone Lions.

=== Villegailhenc Aragon XIII ===
Bastas was released by Doncaster at the end of the 2019 season. He joined Villegailhenc-Aragon XIII in the Elite Two Championship on 20 October 2019.

=== Saint-Gaudens Bears ===
On 8 Jan 2021 it was announced that Bastas has signed for Saint-Gaudens Bears in the Elite One Championship

=== Coventry Bears ===
On 7 May 2021 it was reported that he had signed for Coventry Bears in the RFL League 1

=== International ===
He was selected to represent the Greece national team in 2014 and was part of the squad that played in the European Championship Group C and also in the Balkans Cup. In October 2017, at age 23, Bastas was named as captain of the national team ahead of the 2017 Balkans Cup.

He was also part of Greece's 2021 Rugby League World Cup qualifying campaign, in which they qualified for their first Rugby League World Cup.
