= Michael Ward (rugby league) =

Ireland international rugby league footballer

Mike Ward
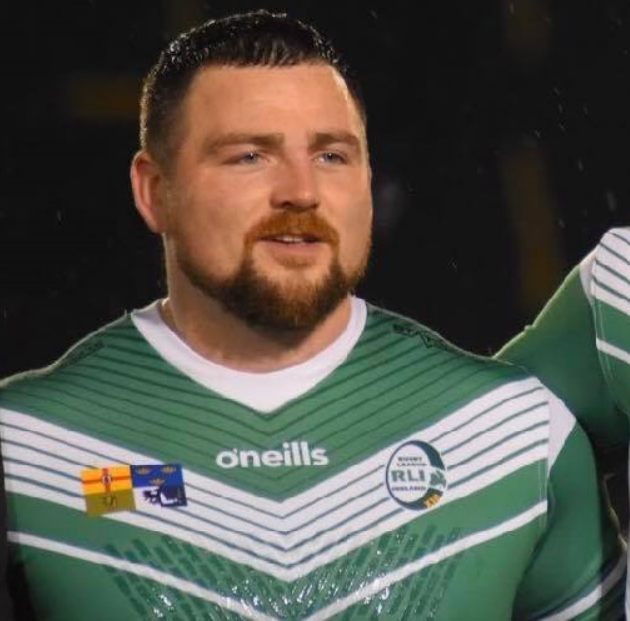

Personal information
- Full name: Michael Ward
- Born: 10 February 1991 (age 35) Oldham, England
- Height: 6 ft 0 in (1.82 m)
- Weight: 16 st 7 lb (105 kg)

Playing information
- Position: Prop
Club
Years	Team	Pld	T	G	FG	P
2011–17	Oldham	169	40	0	0	160
2018–	Batley Bulldogs	184	18	0	0	72
	Total	353	58	0	0	232
Representative
Years	Team	Pld	T	G	FG	P
2018–26	Ireland	7	0	0	0	0
- Source: As of 22 October 2026

Michael Ward (born 10 February 1991) is an Ireland international rugby league footballer who plays as a prop for the Batley Bulldogs in the Betfred Championship.

He previously played for Oldham in League 1 and the Championship.

== Background ==
Ward was born in Oldham, Greater Manchester, England.

== Career ==
In 2016, he was called up to the Ireland squad for the 2017 Rugby League World Cup European Pool B qualifiers.

Ward previously played for the Oldham in the Kingstone Press Championship.

Michael Ward works as a maths teacher in Whitcliffe Mount School.
