= Rhodes Knights =

Greek amateur rugby league club, based in Rhodes

Rhodes Knights Rugby League
Club information
- Colours: Black; White; Red
- Founded: 2010; 16 years ago
- Website: https://www.facebook.com/rhodesknightsrl/

Current details
- Ground: Kallipatera Sports Centre, Rhodes
- CEO: Zafirios Skandaliaris
- Coach: Michael Chatziioannou
- Captain: Michael Chatziioannou
- Competition: Greek Rugby League Association's 2017 Championship
- 2016-2017: 1st

Rhodes Knights Rugby League is an amateur Greek Rugby league club from Rhodes, Greece. Knights compete in the Greek Rugby League Association's 2017 Championship, which are currently in first place. They competed and were declared undefeated champions of 2014 and 2015 Hellenic Rugby League Federation's 1st Championship Division and 2016 Greek Rugby League Association's Championship. They are 2015 Greek Rugby League Challenge Cup holders.

== History ==
The club was founded in 2010 as a Rugby Union club. Their motto ″aut inveniam viam aut faciam″ became the spirit of the club upon its creation. Club's main goals are to play a leading role in the Greek league and in amateur sports in general. Knights have participated in many social activities not restricted to the sport and thus aspire to familiarize people with Rugby. Also, their main objective is to restore the principles of fair play through sport and the promotion of Rhodes as an active and dynamic cultural center, open to stimuli received from the alternative sports tourism.

In 2012, Knights were joined by players of the Rhodes Colossi team and, by the provisional name of Rhodian Rugby Unity, were admitted in the Hellenic Rugby League Championship. In 2013, Knights won the Greek Rugby League 9's Championship and by 2014, they won, undefeated, the inaugural Hellenic Rugby League Championship.

The 2015 season found Rhodes Knights still strong in the field. By May 2015, despite dominating all of their opponents, the Federation's Disciplinary Committee have found Knights susceptible to a number of violations, which ultimately resulted in their demotion to second-to-last place of the Championship's points board. Under the threat of disbanding the Federation and within days of Hellenic Rugby League Championship's Final set date, Disciplinary Committee dismissed Knights for the majority of violations. But by then, Knights, along with Aris Petroupolis and Pegasus Neos Kosmos, had formally resigned from the Hellenic Rugby League Federation, as well as the 1st Division Championship, submitting a no confidence vote to the current Hellenic Rugby League Federation Board and demanding the resignation of the HRLF Board. Pegasus were declared Champions due to the inability of hosting a final game. Still, in May 2015, Knights hosted with the majority of Pegasus's team that had resigned the Greek Rugby League Challenge Cup. On May 30, 2015, Pegasus, under the name Attica Rhinos were defeated by Rhodes Knights.

In 2016, Knights and Patron Achaikos Athletic Club - Patras Rugby co-create Greek Rugby League Association, due to the inability of the former Hellenic Rugby League Federation to successfully host the Championship, as an aftermath to previous year's discrepancies. Joined by Attica Rhinos and Aris Eagles, they host the 1st GRLA 2016 Championship, which Rhodes Knights win undefeated.

In October 2016, Knights host the Rhodes 8's Rugby League Tournament, which featured all four GRLA teams and were joined by the teams of Australian Greeks, Rhodes Knights B-Team, and Kadıköy Ragbi Spor Kulübü Club. Australian Greeks won the 8's tournament in the final game against Kadıköy and Rhodes Knights B won third place against Aris Eagles. The following days, Rhodes hosted a Rugby XIII International Friendly Match between Greek Nationals of GRLA and Turkish Nationals of Turkish Rugby League Association. In a stunning clash, GRLA's players won their Turkish counterparts, with a commanding appearance. Rhodes Knights were represented in the GRLA National Team by a number of players, including Nikolaos Bosmos, Stefanos Bastas, Dimosthenis Kartsonakis, Georgios Tsiakos, Panayiotis Lampousis, Antonios Chatzimarkos, Spiridon Kigais and Pantelis Arfaras.

In 2017, Greek Rugby League Association were granted observer status by Rugby League European Federation and was licensed by RLEF and Rugby League International Federation as the sole Greek Organization for conducting matches, competitions and technical courses in the sport of Rugby League. Rhodes Knights compete in the 2017 GRLA Championship, which are currently in first position and they will defend their title in the June 2017 Final.

== Colours ==
Club's jerseys have been mainly black, as were the colours of the Hospitaller Knights of Medieval Rhodes. Up until 2014, jerseys have had white Maltese crosses on their right main side and left shoulder aera. Shorts were black and white. Since 2014, the club is using black jerseys with a red and white "V" around the collar, with a white cross on the right arm, and black shorts.

== Emblem ==
Since 2014, Rhodes Knights are using the red-detailed shield-shaped emblem displaying a Hospitaller knight, the characteristic white cross and year of establishment.

== Players ==
=== Current squad ===
Rhodes Knights Rugby Club 2022
First team squad			Coaching staff
Michael Chatziioannou (c) – SR, HK; Andreas Ktenas – PR; Kosmas Chatzimichalis – PR; Pantelis Tsattalios (gk) – PR, SR; Nikolaos Bosmos (gk) – FE, HB, HK; Efstratios Macherakis – HK, FE; Fotios Exadaktilos – SR; Nikolaos Chatzinikolaou – SR; Panayiotis Papakonstantis – PR, SR; Pantelis Arfaras – LK, CE	Konstantinos Katsidonis – WG, HK; Alvaro Zota – CE; Georgios Tsiakos – CE; Michael Antoniou – WG; Spiridon Kigais – CE, WG; Michael Bosmos – WG, HK; Panayiotis Lampousis – WG; Themistoklis Natsikas – CE, WG; Kosmas Tsavaris – SR, PR; Georgios Raftopoulos – PR	Alexandros Bochonis – WG; Empedoklis Ipsilantis – PR, SR; Christos Sehai – WG; Polichronis Leventis – PR; Leonidas Mingkos – PR; Christos Nikolopoulos – CE; Theodoros Ananias – SR; Ioannis Pakirtzis – WG; Dimitrios Roussos – SR; Michael Giorgas – WG; Antonios Chatzimarkos – SR, CE	Head coach: Michael Chatziioannou; Legend: (c) Captain(s); (vc) Vice-captain(s); (gk) Goal kicker

== See also ==
- Greek Rugby League Association
- Greece national rugby league team
