= Steve Georgallis =

Greek-Australian rugby league coach and former player

Personal information
- Full name: Steven Georgallis
- Born: 17 June 1968 (age 58)
- Height: 180 cm (5 ft 11 in)
- Weight: 92 kg (14 st 7 lb)

Playing information
- Position: Halfback, Five-eighth, Lock, Centre
Club
Years	Team	Pld	T	G	FG	P
1989–92	Eastern Suburbs	38	5	0	0	20
1991	Carlisle	33	17	0	1	69
1993–99	Western Suburbs	148	20	0	0	80
1995	Wakefield Trinity	17	5	0	0	20
2000	Wests Tigers	20	1	0	0	4
2001	Warrington Wolves	10	2	0	0	8
	Total	266	50	0	1	201
Representative
Years	Team	Pld	T	G	FG	P
2003	Greece	2	0	0	0	0

Coaching information
Club
Years	Team	Gms	W	D	L	W%
2011	Penrith Panthers	11	4	0	7	36
2020	Canterbury Bulldogs	11	3	0	8	27
2024	Parramatta Eels Women	20	10	0	10	50
	Total	42	17	0	25	40
Representative
Years	Team	Gms	W	D	L	W%
2003–	Greece	22	16	0	6	73
- Source: As of 22 November 2026

Steve Georgallis (Greek: Σταυρος Γεωργάλλης; born 17 June 1968) is an Australian professional rugby league football coach who is the head coach of Greece, an assistant coach for the North Queensland Cowboys in the National Rugby League (NRL), Head Coach of the Parramatta Eels Women's team (NRLW), and former professional rugby league footballer.

A half or lock, he played for the Eastern Suburbs Roosters, Western Suburbs Magpies and the Wests Tigers, as well as in England for Carlisle, Wakefield Trinity and the Warrington Wolves. As a coach, he has served as interim head coach for the Penrith Panthers and Canterbury-Bankstown Bulldogs.

== Playing career ==
Georgallis made his début with Eastern Suburbs in 1989 playing halfback. Over the four seasons with the club he had spells playing as a five-eighth, fullback and centre without being able to cement a position, making only 38 appearances.

Joining Western Suburbs in 1993, he proved just as adaptable, and was a cornerstone of the team for seven seasons, playing in 148 games. During this time he also spent an off-season in England playing for Wakefield Trinity. By 1999, Georgallis had started making appearances as a lock, and was captaining the struggling Western Suburbs club. He played a season mostly from the bench for the Wests Tigers after the merger with Balmain including their final ever game as a stand-alone entity which came in round 26 of the 1999 NRL season against the Auckland Warriors which ended in a 60–16 loss. In round 1 of the 2000 NRL season, Georgallis played for the Wests Tigers in their inaugural game against Brisbane which ended in a 24–24 draw. Georgallis was cheered from the field at the completion of his last Australian game which was a 36–26 loss against Melbourne at Campbelltown Stadium.

In 2001, Georgallis joined the Warrington Wolves for a season. Wolves' coach Darryl van der Velde said at the time, "He knows what Rugby League's all about. He is very strong, has good hands and is always busy on the field." Unfortunately, Georgallis only lasted six games before the end of his professional career, though he did make later appearances as captain of Greece.

== Coaching career ==
In 2003, Georgallis became the head coach of the Greece national rugby league team and the Western Suburbs Magpies SG Ball Cup team. On 31 August 2003, he coached Greece in their first rugby league Test match, a 26–10 win over New Caledonia in Sydney. In 2004, he became head coach of the Magpies NSWRL Premier League team.

In 2006, Georgallis joined the Penrith Panthers as an assistant coach and head coach of their NSWRL Premier League feeder club, the St Marys Cougars. In 2008, he became coach of Penrith's National Youth Competition under-20s team, finishing fourth and taking them to the finals.

On 20 June 2011, it was announced that Georgallis would take over as interim head coach of the Penrith Panthers following the resignation of Matthew Elliott. He had immediate success, defeating the North Queensland Cowboys 30–20 in his first game in charge. Georgallis had won his first two games when it was announced that Phil Gould had chosen Ivan Cleary to be the Penrith coach from 2012 onwards. The Penrith club won just two of the remaining nine games of the season.

In 2012, Georgallis joined his former club, the Wests Tigers, as an assistant coach. In 2014, Georgallis joined the Manly Warringah Sea Eagles as an assistant coach, spending two years at the club. In 2016, he re-joined Penrith as the club's NSW Cup head coach.

On 15 December 2016, Georgallis was named as head coach of the Canterbury-Bankstown Bulldogs for the 2017 season. Georgallis led the side to a Top 4 finish and a finals appearance. On 26 October 2017, he was promoted to assistant coach of the Canterbury NRL side while remaining as their NSW Cup head coach.

In 2018, Georgallis led Canterbury-Bankstown to Intrust Super Premiership and the NRL State Championship victories. On 6 November 2018, he was named as an assistant coach of Canterbury-Bankstown on a full-time basis.

In November 2019, Georgallis' Greece side qualified for the 2021 Rugby League World Cup, the country's first Rugby League World Cup qualification.

On 14 July 2020, following Canterbury's Round 9 loss to the Brisbane Broncos, Georgallis was named as the club's interim head coach for the remainder of the 2020 NRL season, following Dean Pay's resignation. In Round 11, Georgallis earned his first win as Canterbury-Bankstown head coach, defeating the Newcastle Knights 18–12 in his second game in charge. In Round 19, Canterbury-Bankstown defeated South Sydney 26–16, helping them to avoid the wooden spoon. Following the appointment of Trent Barrett as Canterbury head coach for the 2021 NRL season, Georgallis left the club.

On 30 October 2020, Georgallis joined the North Queensland Cowboys as an assistant coach under head coach Todd Payten. Georgallis coached Greece at the 2021 Rugby League World Cup where Greece were placed in the hardest group of the Minnows with semi finalists England and finalists Samoa in their pool, failing to win a match but playing valiantly against all especially the French who have played rugby league at the top level for over 70 years.

On 22 November 2023, the Parramatta Eels announced the appointment of Georgallis in a dual role as their NRLW coach and Coaching Director of the club's Elite Pathways program.

== Sources ==
- Alan Whiticker & Glen Hudson (2007). The Encyclopedia of Rugby League Players. Wetherill Park, New South Wales: Gary Allen Pty Ltd. ISBN 978-1-877082-93-1.
