= 2021 Men's Rugby League World Cup Group A =

Group A of the 2021 Rugby League World Cup is one of four groups in the 2021 Rugby League World Cup, which will be played in 2022. The group comprises hosts England as well as automatic qualifiers Samoa, 2018 European Champions France, and Greece, who qualified through the 2019 European play-off tournament.

The pool draw was made on 16 January 2020. The fixtures were announced on 21 July 2020. A revised schedule was issued on 19 November 2021 following the postponement of the tournament from 2021 to 2022. The Samoa vs France match was played as a double-header with the final of the 2021 Physical Disability Rugby League World Cup.

== Standings ==
| Pos | Team | Pld | W | D | L | PF | PA | PD | Pts | Qualification |
|---|---|---|---|---|---|---|---|---|---|---|
| 1 | England (H) | 3 | 3 | 0 | 0 | 196 | 28 | +168 | 6 | Advance to knockout stage |
| 2 | Samoa | 3 | 2 | 0 | 1 | 140 | 68 | +72 | 4 | Advance to knockout stage |
| 3 | France | 3 | 1 | 0 | 2 | 56 | 116 | −60 | 2 | |
| 4 | Greece | 3 | 0 | 0 | 3 | 20 | 200 | −180 | 0 | |

Source: rlwc2021
(H) Hosts

== Matches ==
=== England vs Samoa ===
15 October 2022
14:30 BST (UTC+01:00)

| England | 60–6 | Samoa |
|---|---|---|
| Tries: Welsby 22'; Young (2) 25', 30'; Watkins 49'; Farnworth 65'; Whitehead (2) 69', 71'; Makinson 74'; Williams 76'; Burgess 80'; Goals: Makinson (10/12) 6' pen, 23', 26', 49', 63' pen, 66', 69', 71', 74', 79' | Report | Tries: Tago 34'; Goals: Crichton (1/1) 35' |

St James' Park, Newcastle
Attendance: 43,199
Referee: Ashley Klein (Australia)
Touch judges: Jack Smith (England), Warren Turley (England)
Player of the Match: Victor Radley (England)

Team details
| England | | Position | Samoa |
| Name | Number | Position | Number | Name |
|---|---|---|---|---|
| Sam Tomkins | 1 | Fullback | 1 | Joseph Suaalii |
| Tommy Makinson | 2 | Wing | 18 | Hamiso Tabuai-Fidow |
| Kallum Watkins | 3 | Centre | 3 | Izack Tago |
| Herbie Farnworth | 4 | Centre | 4 | Stephen Crichton |
| Dom Young | 14 | Wing | 5 | Brian To'o |
| Jack Welsby | 6 | Stand off/Five eighth | 6 | Jarome Luai |
| George Williams | 7 | Scrum half/Half back | 7 | Anthony Milford |
| Tom Burgess | 8 | Prop forward | 8 | Josh Papali'i |
| Micky McIlorum | 9 | Hooker | 9 | Danny Levi |
| Chris Hill | 18 | Prop forward | 10 | Junior Paulo |
| Elliott Whitehead | 11 | Second row | 12 | Jaydn Su'a |
| Mike McMeeken | 20 | Second row | 13 | Josh Aloiai |
| Victor Radley | 13 | Loose forward/Lock forward | 24 | Braden Hamlin-Uele |
| Luke Thompson | 10 | Interchange | 14 | Tyrone May |
| Morgan Knowles | 15 | Interchange | 16 | Spencer Leniu |
| Matty Lees | 16 | Interchange | 17 | Martin Taupau |
| Mike Cooper | 17 | Interchange | 22 | Kelma Tuilagi |
| Shaun Wane | | Coach | | Matt Parish |
Rugby League Project

=== France vs Greece ===
17 October 2022
19:30 BST (UTC+01:00)

| France | 34–12 | Greece |
|---|---|---|
| Tries: Dezaria 9'; Gigot 30'; Jullien (2) 34', 74'; Mourgue 47'; Goals: Mourgue (7/7) 10', 24' pen, 30', 36', 49', 67' pen, 76' | Report | Tries: Taukamo 56'; Mougios 79'; Goals: Ilias (2/2) 58', 80' |

Eco-Power Stadium, Doncaster
Attendance: 4,182
Referee: Adam Gee (Australia)
Touch judges: Kasey Badger (Australia), James Vella (England)
Player of the Match: Benjamin Garcia (France)

Team details
| France | | Position | Greece |
| Name | Number | Position | Number | Name |
|---|---|---|---|---|
| Morgan Escaré | 1 | Fullback | 1 | Chaise Robinson |
| Arthur Romano | 2 | Wing | 2 | Siteni Taukamo |
| Samisoni Langi | 3 | Centre | 3 | Terry Constantinou |
| Matthieu Laguerre | 4 | Centre | 4 | Nick Mougios |
| Fouad Yaha | 5 | Wing | 5 | Johnny Mitsias |
| Arthur Mourgue | 6 | Stand off/Five eighth | 6 | Lachlan Ilias |
| Tony Gigot | 7 | Scrum half/Half back | 7 | Jordan Meads |
| Jordan Dezaria | 8 | Prop forward | 8 | Robert Tuliatu |
| Alrix Da Costa | 9 | Hooker | 9 | Peter Mamouzelos |
| Lambert Belmas | 10 | Prop forward | 16 | Sebastian Sell |
| Benjamin Jullien | 11 | Second row | 11 | Mitchell Zampetides |
| Paul Séguier | 12 | Second row | 12 | Nicholas Flocas |
| Benjamin Garcia | 13 | Loose forward/Lock forward | 13 | Billy Magoulias |
| Eloi Pelissier | 14 | Interchange | 14 | Jake Kambos |
| Justin Sangaré | 15 | Interchange | 15 | Myles Gal |
| Mickaël Goudemand | 17 | Interchange | 17 | Theodoros Nianiakas |
| Corentin Le Cam | 19 | Interchange | 18 | Aris Dardamanis |
Rugby League Project

=== England vs France ===
22 October 2022
17:00 BST (UTC+01:00)

| England | 42–18 | France |
|---|---|---|
| Tries: Hall (2) 6', 12'; Thompson 24'; Whitehead 45'; Radley 50'; Young (2) 57', 66'; Goals: Sneyd (7/7) 8', 13', 26', 46', 51’, 58', 67' | Report | Tries: Mourgue 29'; Pelissier 33'; Romano 76'; Goals: Mourgue (3/3) 30', 33', 77' |

University of Bolton Stadium, Bolton
Attendance: 23,648
Referee: Gerard Sutton (Australia)
Touch judges: Liam Moore (England), Todd Smith (Australia)
Player of the Match: George Williams (England)

Team details
| England | | Position | France |
| Name | Number | Position | Number | Name |
|---|---|---|---|---|
| Sam Tomkins | 1 | Fullback | 1 | Morgan Escare |
| Ryan Hall | 5 | Wing | 2 | Arthur Romano |
| Kallum Watkins | 3 | Centre | 3 | Samisoni Langi |
| Herbie Farnworth | 4 | Centre | 4 | Matthieu Laguerre |
| Dom Young | 14 | Wing | 6 | Arthur Mourgue |
| Marc Sneyd | 21 | Stand off/Five eighth | 7 | Tony Gigot |
| George Williams | 7 | Scrum half/Half back | 8 | Jordan Dezaria |
| Tom Burgess (yellow card) 80' | 8 | Prop forward | 9 | Alrix Da Costa |
| Michael McIlorum | 9 | Hooker | 10 | Lambert Belmas |
| Chris Hill | 18 | Prop forward | 11 | Benjamin Jullien |
| Elliot Whitehead | 11 | Second row | 12 | Paul Séguier |
| John Bateman | 12 | Second row | 13 | Benjamin Garcia |
| Victor Radley | 13 | Loose forward/Lock forward | 17 | Mickael Goudemand |
| Jack Welsby | 6 | Interchange | 14 | Eloi Pelissier |
| Luke Thompson | 10 | Interchange | 15 | Justin Sangare |
| Andy Ackers | 19 | Interchange | 16 | Gadwin Springer |
| Mikolaj Oledzki | 23 | Interchange | 19 | Corentin Le Cam |
| Shaun Wane | | Coach |
Rugby League Project

=== Samoa vs Greece ===
23 October 2022
17:00 BST (UTC+01:00)

| Samoa | 72–4 | Greece |
|---|---|---|
| Tries: To'o 1'; Paulo 5'; Levi 16', 70'; Harris-Tavita 22', 60'; Hunt 30'; Luai 33'; Lafai (2) 37', 80'; Brown 53'; Crichton 56'; Feagai 64'; Goals: Crichton (10/13) 3', 5', 17', 23', 31', 34', 38', 54', 61', 71' | Report | Tries: Ilias 49'; Goals: Ilias (0/1) |

Eco-Power Stadium, Doncaster
Attendance: 4,415
Referee: James Child (England)
Touch judges: Liam Rush (England), Robert Hicks (England)
Player of the Match: Jarome Luai (Samoa)

Team details
| Samoa | | Position | Greece |
| Name | Number | Position | Number | Name |
|---|---|---|---|---|
| Joseph Suaalii | 1 | Fullback | 1 | Chaise Robinson |
| Brian To'o | 5 | Wing | 2 | Siteni Taukamo |
| Stephen Crichton | 4 | Centre | 3 | Terence Constantinou |
| Tim Lafai | 25 | Centre | 4 | Nicholas Mougios |
| Mat Feagai | 19 | Wing | 5 | John Mitsias |
| Jarome Luai | 6 | Stand off/Five eighth | 13 | Billy Magoulias |
| Chanel Harris-Tavita | 20 | Scrum half/Half back | 6 | Lachlan Ilias |
| Josh Papali'i | 8 | Prop forward | 12 | Nicholas Flocas |
| Danny Levi | 9 | Hooker | 9 | Peter Mamouzelos |
| Junior Paulo | 10 | Prop forward | 10 | Stefanos Bastas |
| Ligi Sao | 11 | Second row | 14 | Jake Kambos |
| Jaydn Su'a | 12 | Second row | 25 | Adam Vrahnos |
| Josh Aloiai | 13 | Loose forward/Lock forward | 16 | Sebastian Sell |
| Fa'amanu Brown | 21 | Interchange | 15 | Myles Gal |
| Royce Hunt | 15 | Interchange | 17 | Theodoros Nianiakas |
| Oregon Kaufusi | 23 | Interchange | 19 | Liam Sue-Tin |
| Martin Taupau | 17 | Interchange | 23 | Nikolaos Bosmos |
Rugby League Project

=== England vs Greece ===
29 October 2022
14:30 BST (UTC+01:00)

| England | 94–4 | Greece |
|---|---|---|
| Tries: Lees 3'; Young (4) 13', 25', 35', 37'; Hall (2) 28', 59'; Burgess (2) 33', 53'; Williams 40'; Makinson 43'; Sneyd 49'; Batchelor 63'; Ackers (2) 67', 75'; Pearce-Paul 73'; McMeeken 77'; Goals: Sneyd (13/17) 4', 27', 34', 36', 39', 40', 43', 50', 55', 60', 68', 76', 77' | Report | Tries: Taukamo 18'; Goals: Ilias (0/1) |

Bramall Lane, Sheffield
Attendance: 18,760
Referee: Belinda Sharpe (Australia)
Touch judges: Marcus Griffiths (England), Wyatt Raymond (Australia)
Player of the Match: Marc Sneyd (England)

Team details
| England | | Position | Greece |
| Name | Number | Position | Number | Name |
|---|---|---|---|---|
| Tommy Makinson | 2 | Fullback | 2 | Siteni Taukamo |
| Ryan Hall | 5 | Wing | 4 | Nick Mougios |
| Jack Welsby | 6 | Centre | 3 | Terry Constantinou |
| Kai Pearce-Paul | 24 | Centre | 25 | Adam Vrahnos |
| Dom Young | 14 | Wing | 5 | John Mitsias |
| Marc Sneyd | 21 | Stand off/Five eighth | 6 | Lachlan Ilias |
| George Williams | 7 | Scrum half/Half back | 7 | Jordan Meads |
| Matty Lees | 16 | Prop forward | 8 | Rob Tuliatu |
| Andy Ackers | 19 | Hooker | 9 | Peter Mamouzelos |
| Mike Cooper | 17 | Prop forward | 22 | Ioannis Rousoglou |
| John Bateman | 12 | Second row | 11 | Mitchell Zampetides |
| Joe Batchelor | 22 | Second row | 14 | Jake Kambos |
| Victor Radley | 13 | Loose forward/Lock forward | 12 | Nick Flocas |
| Burgess | 8 | Interchange | 16 | Sebastian Sell |
| Morgan Knowles | 15 | Interchange | 17 | Theodoros Nianiakas |
| Chris Hill | 18 | Interchange | 20 | Ioannis Nake |
| Mike McMeeken | 20 | Interchange | 21 | Konstantinos Katsidonis |
| Shaun Wane | | Coach |
Rugby League Project

=== Samoa vs France ===
30 October 2022
17:00 GMT (UTC±00:00)

| Samoa | 62–4 | France |
|---|---|---|
| Tries: Lafai (2) 4', 66'; To'o (2) 17', 47'; Ta. May (4) 21', 34', 40', 44'; Milford (2) 62', 74'; Harris-Tavita 69'; Goals: Crichton (9/11) 5', 22', 36', 40', 45', 48', 64', 70', 75' | Report | Tries: Yaha 53'; Goals: Mourgue (0/1) |

Halliwell Jones Stadium, Warrington
Attendance: 6,756
Referee: Todd Smith (Australia)
Touch judges: Liam Rush (England), Warren Turley (England)

Team details
| Samoa | | Position | France |
| Name | Number | Position | Number | Name |
|---|---|---|---|---|
| | 1 | Fullback | 1 |
| | 2 | Wing | 2 |
| | 3 | Centre | 3 |
| | 4 | Centre | 4 |
| | 5 | Wing | 5 |
| | 6 | Stand off/Five eighth | 6 |
| | 7 | Scrum half/Half back | 7 |
| | 8 | Prop forward | 8 |
| | 9 | Hooker | 9 |
| | 10 | Prop forward | 10 |
| | 11 | Second row | 11 |
| | 12 | Second row | 12 |
| | 13 | Loose forward/Lock forward | 13 |
| | | Interchange |
| | | Interchange |
| | | Interchange |
| | | Interchange |
Rugby League Project
