= List of international sports matches held at Old Trafford =

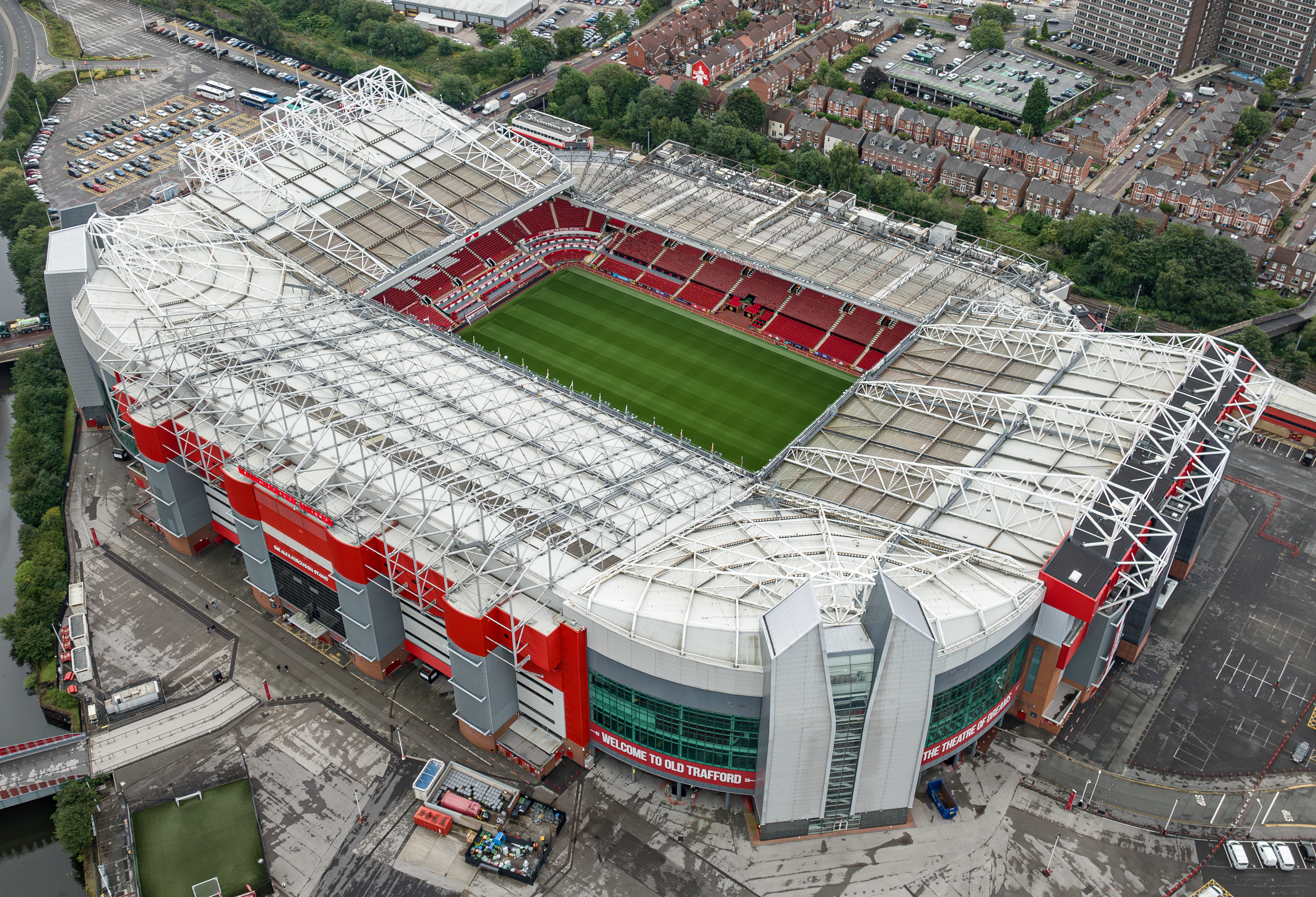

Old Trafford is the home stadium of Manchester United F.C. and the venue of the annual Super League Grand Final. The stadium has also hosted various international matches in association football, rugby league, and rugby union.

== Association football ==
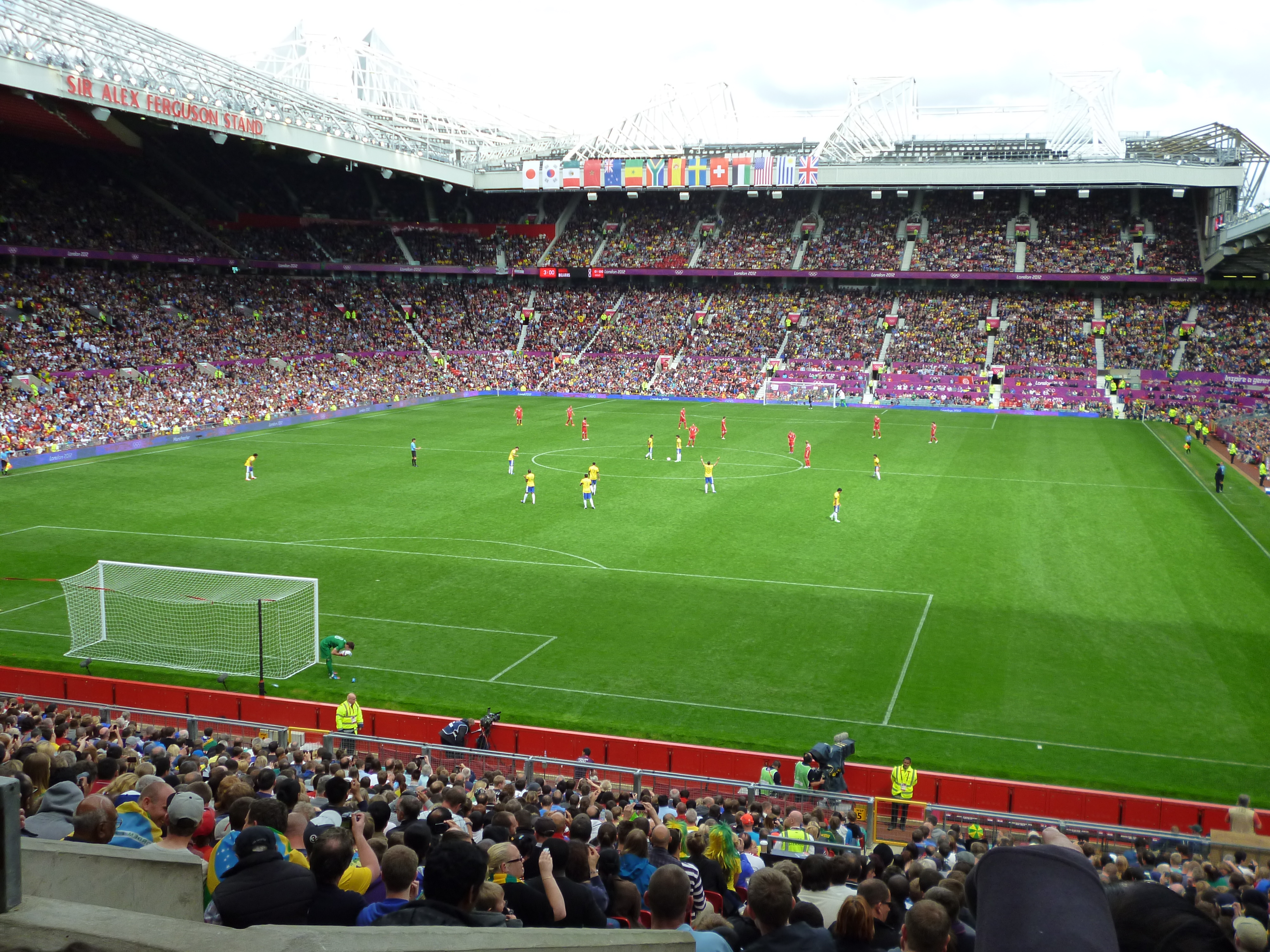
Old Trafford hosting Brazil and Belarus during the 2012 Summer Olympics

Old Trafford has hosted the 1966 FIFA World Cup, UEFA Euro 1996, 2012 Summer Olympics Football Tournament, and UEFA Women's Euro 2022. It has also infrequently hosted home matches of the England national football team however it became a regular home stadium during the rebuilding of Wembley Stadium between 2000 and 2007.

=== Men's ===
Date	Team 1	Score	Team 2	Event	Attendance	Ref.
17 April 1926	England	0–1	Scotland	1925–26 British Home Championship	Unknown	
18 November 1938	England	7–0	Ireland	1938–39 British Home Championship	~40,000	
13 July 1966	Portugal	3–1	Hungary	1966 FIFA World Cup group stage	29,886	
16 July 1966	Portugal	3–0	Bulgaria	1966 FIFA World Cup group stage	25,438	
20 July 1966	Hungary	3–1	Bulgaria	1966 FIFA World Cup group stage	24,129	
9 June 1996	Germany	2–0	Czech Republic	UEFA Euro 1996 group stage	37,300	
16 June 1996	Russia	0–3	Germany	UEFA Euro 1996 group stage	50,760	
19 June 1996	Italy	0–0	Germany	UEFA Euro 1996 group stage	53,740	
23 June 1996	Germany	2–1	Croatia	UEFA Euro 1996 quarter-final	43,412	
26 June 1996	France	0–0 (a.e.t.); 5–6p	Czech Republic	UEFA Euro 1996 semi-final	43,877	
24 May 1997	England	2–1	South Africa	Friendly	52,676	
6 October 2001	England	2–2	Greece	2002 FIFA World Cup qualification	~66,000	
10 September 2003	England	2–0	Liechtenstein	UEFA Euro 2004 qualifying	64,931	
16 November 2003	England	2–3	Denmark	Friendly	64,159	
9 October 2004	England	2–0	Wales	2006 FIFA World Cup qualification	65,224	
26 March 2005	England	4–0	Northern Ireland	2006 FIFA World Cup qualification	62,239	
8 October 2005	England	1–0	Austria	2006 FIFA World Cup qualification	64,822	
12 October 2005	England	2–1	Poland	2006 FIFA World Cup qualification	65,467	
20 May 2006	England	3–1	Hungary	Friendly	56,323	
3 June 2006	England	6–0	Jamaica	Friendly	70,373	
16 August 2006	England	4–0	Greece	Friendly	45,864	
2 September 2006	England	5–0	Andorra	UEFA Euro 2008 qualifying	56,290	
7 October 2007	England	0–0	Macedonia	UEFA Euro 2008 qualifying	72,062	
7 February 2007	England	0–1	Spain	Friendly	58,247	
26 July 2012	United Arab Emirates	1–2	Uruguay	2012 Summer Olympics group stage	51,745	
26 July 2012	Great Britain	1–1	Senegal	2012 Summer Olympics group stage	72,176	
29 July 2012	Egypt	1–1	New Zealand	2012 Summer Olympics group stage	50,050	
29 July 2012	Brazil	3–1	Belarus	2012 Summer Olympics group stage	66,212	
1 August 2012	Spain	0–0	Morocco	2012 Summer Olympics group stage	35,973	
4 August 2012	Japan	3–0	Egypt	2012 Summer Olympics quarter-final	70,772	
7 August 2012	South Korea	0–3	Brazil	2012 Summer Olympics semi-final	69,389	
18 November 2014	Argentina	0–1	Portugal	Friendly	41,233	
19 June 2023	England	7–0	North Macedonia	UEFA Euro 2024 qualifying	70,708	

=== Women's ===
Date	Team 1	Score	Team 2	Event	Attendance	Ref.
2 September 1990	England	0–0	Norway	UEFA Euro 1991 qualifying	435	
31 July 2012	United States	1–0	North Korea	2012 Summer Olympics group stage	29,522	
6 August 2012	Canada	3–4 (a.e.t.)	United States	2012 Summer Olympics semi-final	26,630	
6 July 2022	England	1–0	Austria	UEFA Euro 2022 Opening Match	68,871	

== Rugby league ==
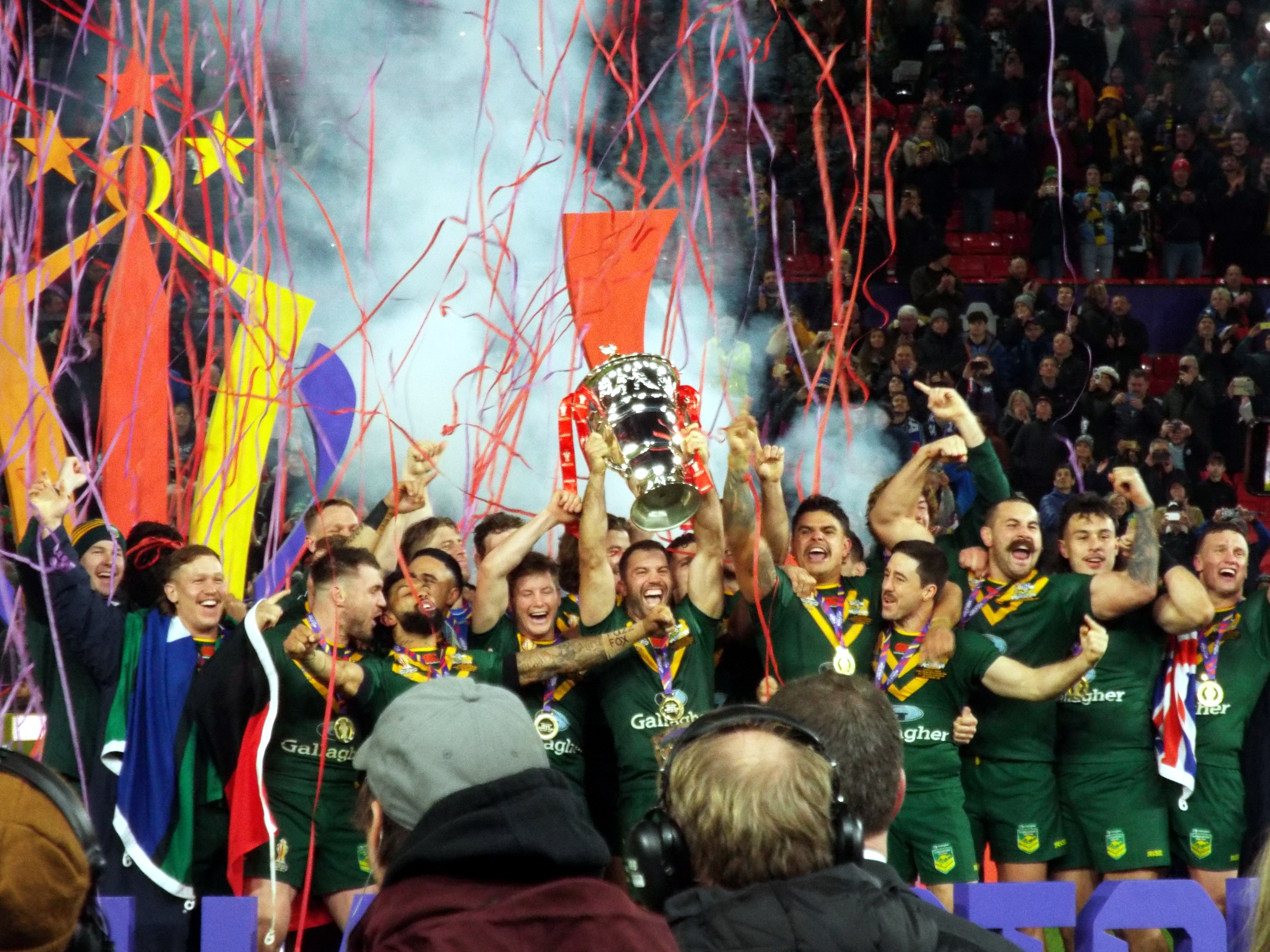
Australia celebrating winning the 2021 Men's Rugby League World Cup final at Old Trafford

Old Trafford has hosted four Rugby League World Cup finals (three men's and one women's) and one semi-final, it has also hosted Ashes games on four occasions.

=== Men's ===
Date	Team 1	Score	Team 2	Event	Attendance	Ref.
25 October 1986	Great Britain	16–38	Australia	1986 Kangaroo tour	50,583	
21 October 1989	Great Britain	16–24	New Zealand	1989 Kiwi tour	18,273	
10 November 1990	Great Britain	10–14	Australia	1990 Kangaroo tour	46,615	
5 November 1994	Great Britain	8–38	Australia	1994 Kangaroo tour	43,930	
22 November 1995	England	25–10	Wales	1995 Rugby League World Cup semi-final	30,042	
8 November 1997	Great Britain	20–12	Australia	Super League Test series	40,324	
25 November 2000	Australia	40–12	New Zealand	2000 Rugby League World Cup final	44,329	
30 November 2013	New Zealand	2–34	Australia	2013 Rugby League World Cup final	74,468	
19 November 2022	Australia	30–10	Samoa	2021 Rugby League World Cup final	67,502	

=== Women's ===
Date	Team 1	Score	Team 2	Event	Attendance	Ref.
19 November 2022	Australia	54–4	New Zealand	2021 Rugby League World Cup final	67,502	

== Rugby union ==
Old Trafford does not regularly host rugby union but has seen two England test matches been played at the stadium, in addition to one Lancashire match.

Date	Team 1	Score	Team 2	Event	Attendance	Ref.
20 October 1924	Lancashire	0–23	New Zealand	Tour match	Unknown	
22 November 1997	England	8–25	New Zealand	Test match	55,243	
6 June 2009	England	37–15	Argentina	Test match	40,521	

== Club matches ==
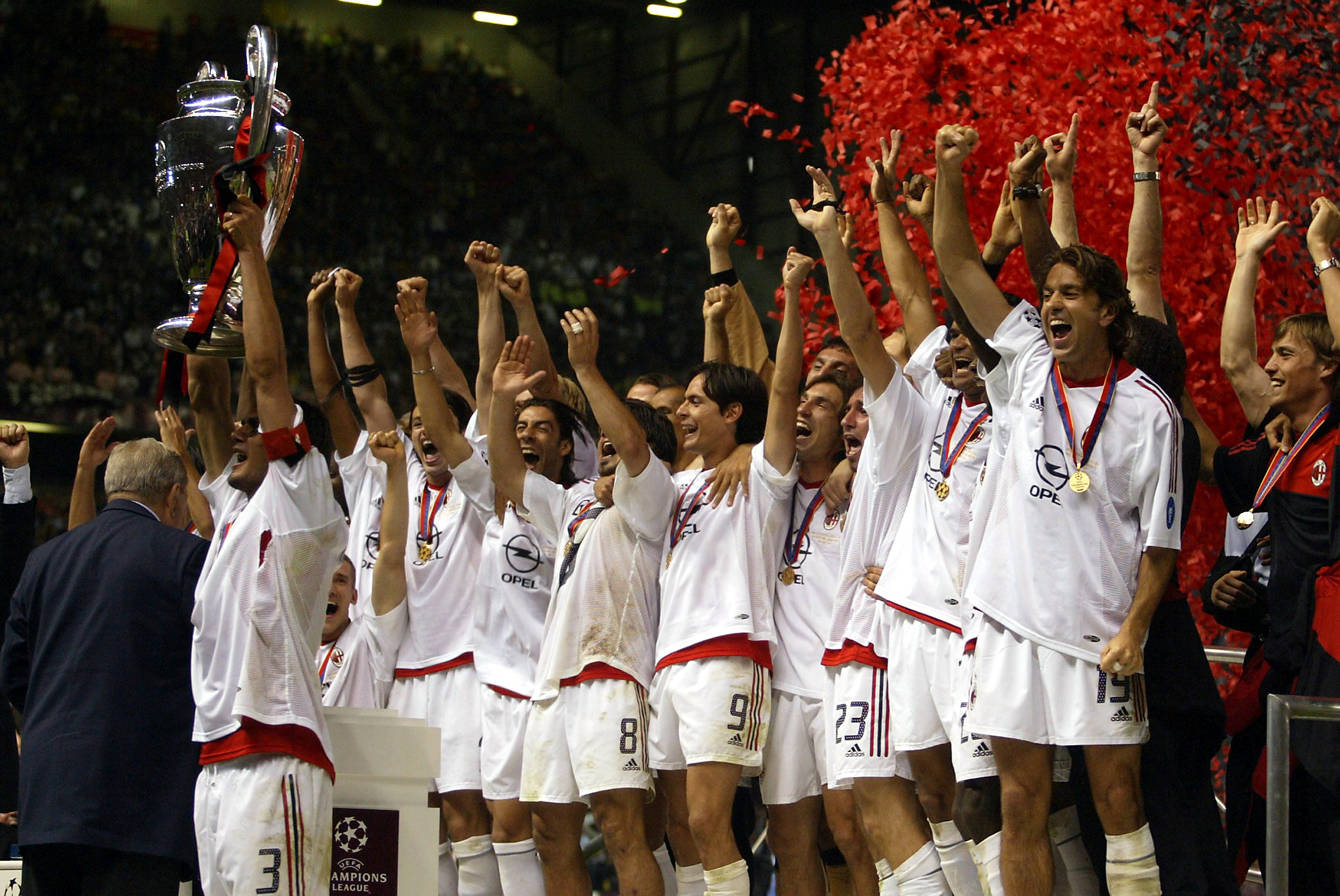
AC Milan won their sixth European title at Old Trafford

Outside of Manchester United's Champions League, Europa League, Cup Winners' Cup, and Women's Champions League matches, Old Trafford has hosted the 1989 World Club Challenge and 2003 UEFA Champions League final.

1989 World Club Challenge

Date	Team 1	Score	Team 2	Attendance	Ref.
4 October 1989	Widnes Vikings	30–18	Canberra Raiders	30,786	

2003 UEFA Champions League final

Date	Team 1	Score	Team 2	Attendance	Ref.
28 May 2003	Juventus	0–0 (a.e.t.); 2–3p	Milan	62,315	

== Individual sports ==
In July 1927, Old Trafford hosted a tennis exhibition match between French Olympic champion and Grand Slam winner Suzanne Lenglen and British Ceylonese player Evelyn Dewhurst. Lenglan defeated Dewhurst 6–0, 6–2 in front of over 15,000 spectators.

In October 1993, a WBC–WBO Super-Middleweight unification fight was held at the ground, with around 42,000 people paying to watch WBO champion Chris Eubank fight WBC champion Nigel Benn.
