= 2021 Men's Rugby League World Cup final =

2021 Rugby League World Cup final
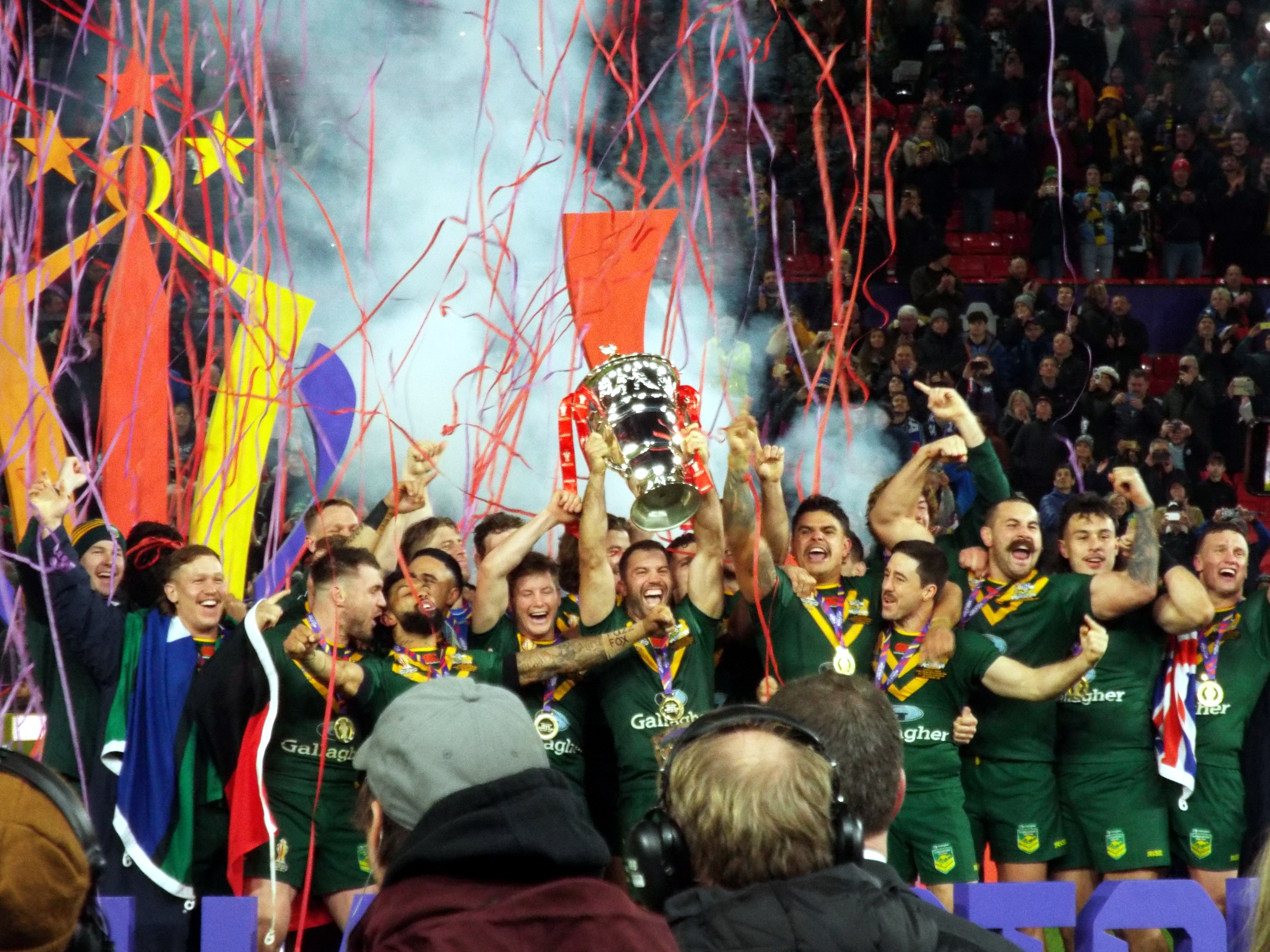
Australia	Samoa
(ARL)	(RLS)
30	10
	1	2	Total
AUS	14	16	30
SAM	0	10	10
- Date: 19 November 2022
- Stadium: Old Trafford
- Location: Manchester, England
- Man of the Match: James Tedesco (Australia)
- Referee: Ashley Klein (Australia)
- Attendance: 67,502

Broadcast partners
- Broadcasters: BBC (United Kingdom); Fox League (Australia)

The 2021 Rugby League World Cup final was the rugby league match to determine the winner of the 2021 Rugby League World Cup, played between Australia and Samoa on 19 November 2022 at Old Trafford in Manchester, England.

== Background ==
The 2021 Men's Rugby League World Cup, was the 16th edition of the World Cup, the IRL's rugby league competition for national teams. The tournament was held in England from 15 October 2022 to 19 November 2022, but was originally scheduled to be held between 23 October 2021 and 27 November 2021 and was postponed due the COVID-19 pandemic and the subsequent withdrawals of Australia and New Zealand. 16 teams competed in the tournament, an increase of two from the previous two tournaments and the first to feature 16 teams since the 2000 Rugby League World Cup.

== Venue ==
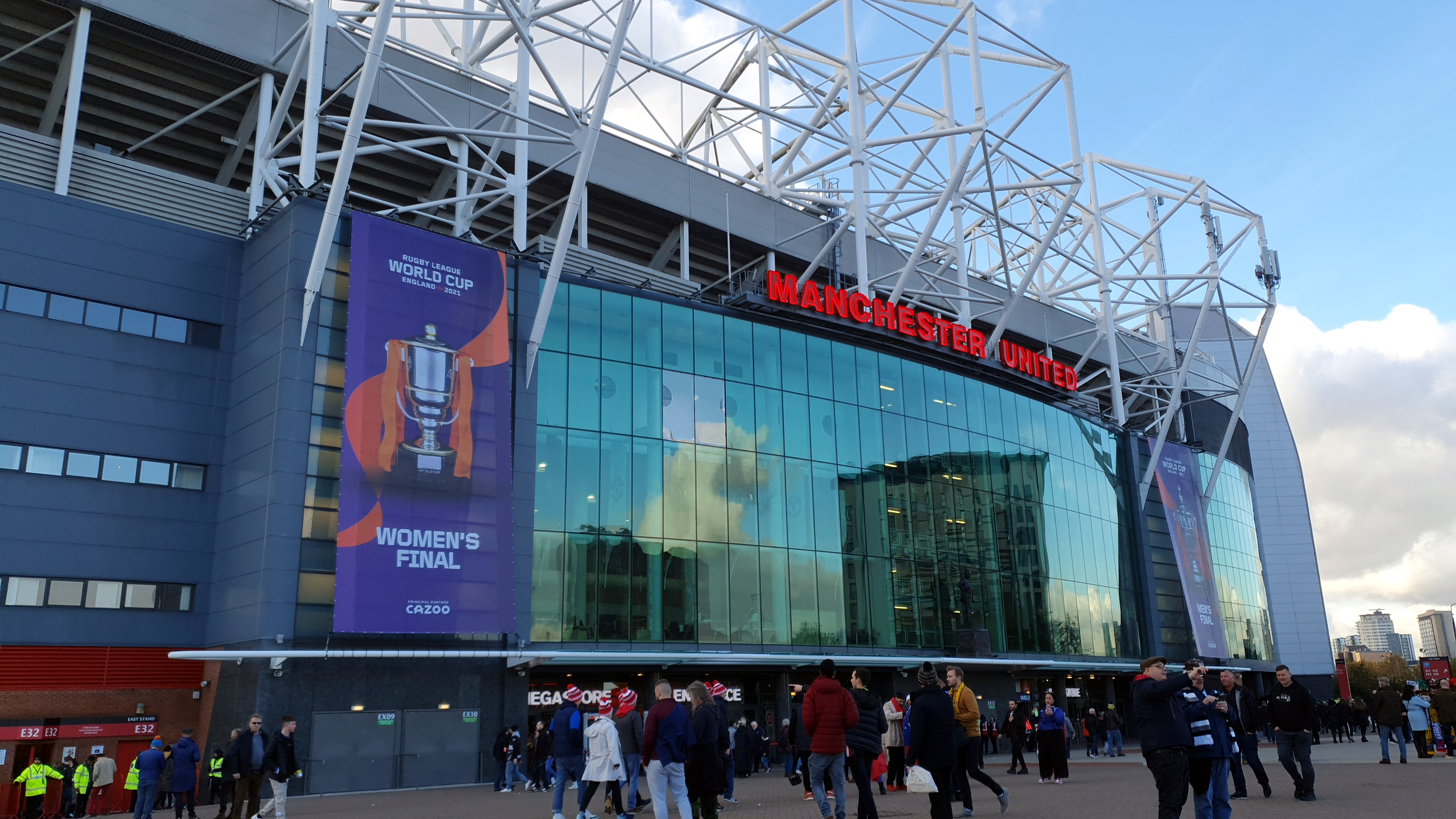
Outside Old Trafford ahead of hosting the World Cup final for the third time.

Old Trafford hosted the World Cup final for the third time, having previously hosted the final in 2000, when Australia beat New Zealand 40–12, and in 2013, when they beat the same opponents 34–2. It was confirmed as the venue to host the final on 10 June 2020, when the fixture for the event was released.

The ground is often used for major rugby league matches, being the primary venue for the annual Super League Grand Final, which is the championship-deciding game of Britain's Super League competition, and top-tier test matches such as Great Britain games during Kangaroo tours.

The ground is the home stadium of English football team Manchester United, and has a capacity of 74,310, which makes it the largest club football stadium (second-largest football stadium overall after Wembley Stadium, and third largest across all sports with rugby union's Twickenham Stadium coming in second) in the United Kingdom, and the eleventh-largest in Europe.

== Route to the final ==
=== Summary ===
Australia		Round	Samoa	
Opponent	Result	Group stage	Opponent	Result
Fiji	42–8	Matchday 1	England	6–60
Scotland	84–0	Matchday 2	Greece	72–6
Italy	66–6	Matchday 3	France	62–4
Group stage winners: Pos / Team / Pld / Pts; 1 / Australia / 3 / 6; 2 / Fiji / 3 / 4; 3 / Italy / 3 / 2; 4 / Scotland / 3 / 0; Source: rlwc2021		Final standings	Group stage runners-up: Pos / Team / Pld / Pts; 1 / England (H) / 3 / 6; 2 / Samoa / 3 / 4; 3 / France / 3 / 2; 4 / Greece / 3 / 0; Source: rlwc2021 (H) Hosts	
Opponent	Result	Knockout stage	Opponent	Result
Lebanon	48–4	Quarter-finals	Tonga	20–18
New Zealand	16–14	Semi-finals	England	27–26 (g.p.)

=== Australia ===
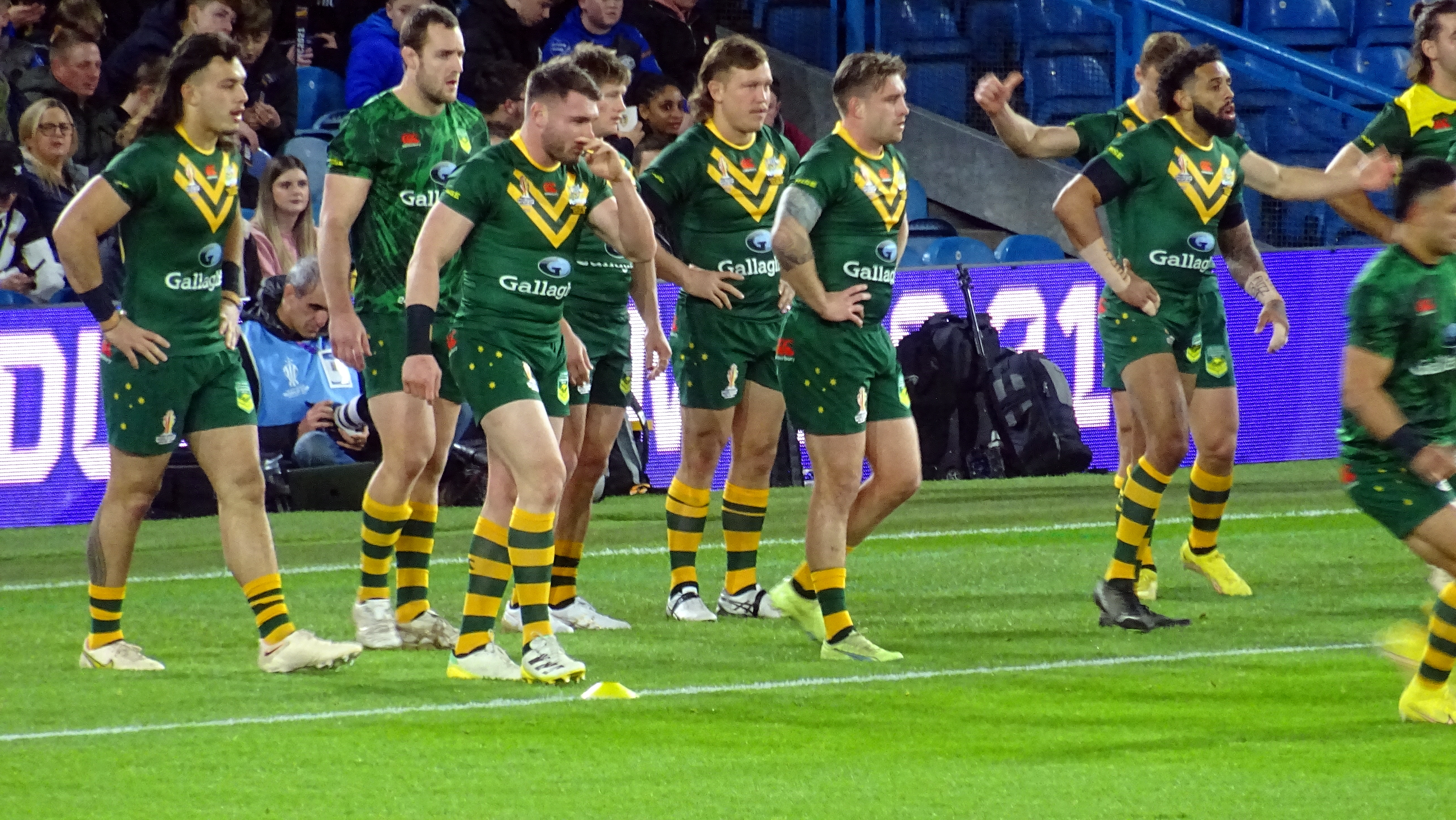
Australia warming up ahead of their semi-final against New Zealand

Australia won all three group stage matches against Fiji, Scotland and Italy all convincingly.

Finishing on top of their group, they played Lebanon in the first quarter-final, where they won 48–4, advancing to a semi-final berth against Trans-Tasman rivals, New Zealand. In the semi-final, Australia were trailing 10–14 at half time to the Kiwis. A 52nd minute converted try to Cameron Murray, ended up being the match winner however, winning the match 16–14 which saw the Kangaroos qualify for their 12th consecutive World Cup final.

=== Samoa ===
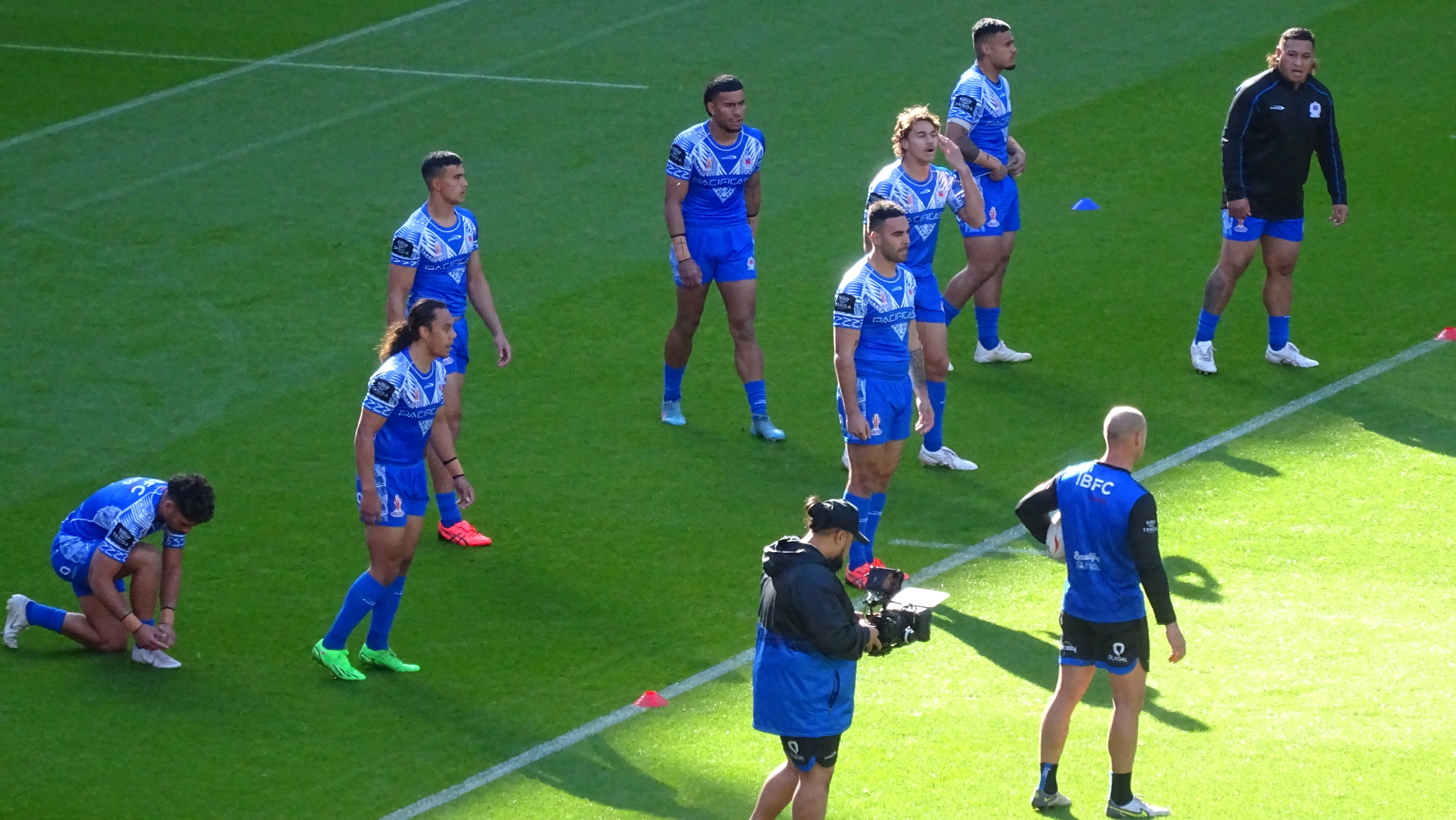
Samoa warming up ahead of their opening group stage match against England

Despite losing the opening match of the tournament 60–6 against host nation England at St James' Park, Samoa finished the group stage in second place after large wins against Greece and France. This qualified them for a quarter-final berth against fellow Pacific island nation, Tonga.

Samoa reached the semi-finals after a narrow 20–18 win over Tonga at Halliwell Jones Stadium in Warrington. Despite both teams scoring three tries each, it was Samoa that won the match, with Stephen Crichton converting all three tries and a penalty goal.

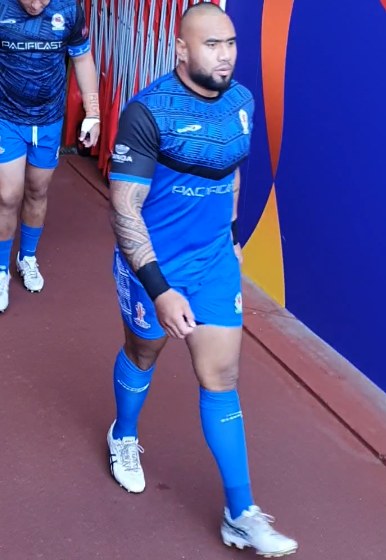
Junior Paulo captained Samoa through the World Cup.

They faced England in the semi-final at the Emirates Stadium in London. Tim Lafai scored the first try of the game in the sixth minute to give Samoa a 4–0 lead, and for the first time in the tournament, England conceded first. Five minutes later, Junior Paulo was shown a yellow card, and also put on report, for a dangerous tackle on George Williams. Elliott Whitehead scored England's first try on 25 minutes, with Tommy Makinson successful with the conversion, to give England a 6–4 lead. Five minutes later, Samoa scored again, this time from Ligi Sao to retake the lead 8–4; Stephen Crichton was successful with the conversion to give Samoa a 10–4 lead at half-time.

Five minutes into the second half, England scored again, this time through John Bateman, and Makinson was once again successful with the conversion to make it 10–10. Two tries in seven minutes saw Samoa take a 20–12 lead, with England now needing at least two tries to draw level. Herbie Farnworth broke clear on 65 minutes, to race away and touch down near the posts, giving Makinson an easy conversion. From the kick-off, England were awarded a penalty, after Sam Tomkins was tackled in the air. Samoa used the captain's challenge, and after a quick review, the video referee agreed with the decision to award the penalty, meaning the challenge was unsuccessful. Makinson opted to kick the penalty and was successful, levelling the scores at 20–20 with just over 12 minutes remaining. Stephen Crichton looked to have won it for Samoa with sven minutes to go, as he intercepted a Dom Young pass to touch down under the posts, converting his own try. There was more drama to come, as Farnworth got his second try of the game with two minutes remaining, Makinson once again converting to take the game to extra time.

Samoa attempted to score the golden point with a drop goal early in extra time, but it was charged down by England. Samoa eventually won the match after a forward pass from Sam Tomkins gave them possession 35 metres out. Crichton kicked the winning drop goal to send Samoa to their first World Cup final, making them the first team other than England, Australia or New Zealand to reach the final in 50 years.

== Pre-match ==
=== Ticketing ===
As of 16 November, it was confirmed by tournament chief executive Jon Dutton, that almost 64,000 tickets had been sold for the match. Dutton conceded that the match will unlikely to sell-out the 74,310 capacity Old Trafford due to tournament hosts England being eliminated in the second semi-final to Samoa. The 2013 final attracted 74,468 fans, but the 2021 edition "will gross three times more" in revenue due to increased ticketing and hospitality prices. The final ended up attracting 67,502 fans in attendance.

=== Officiating ===
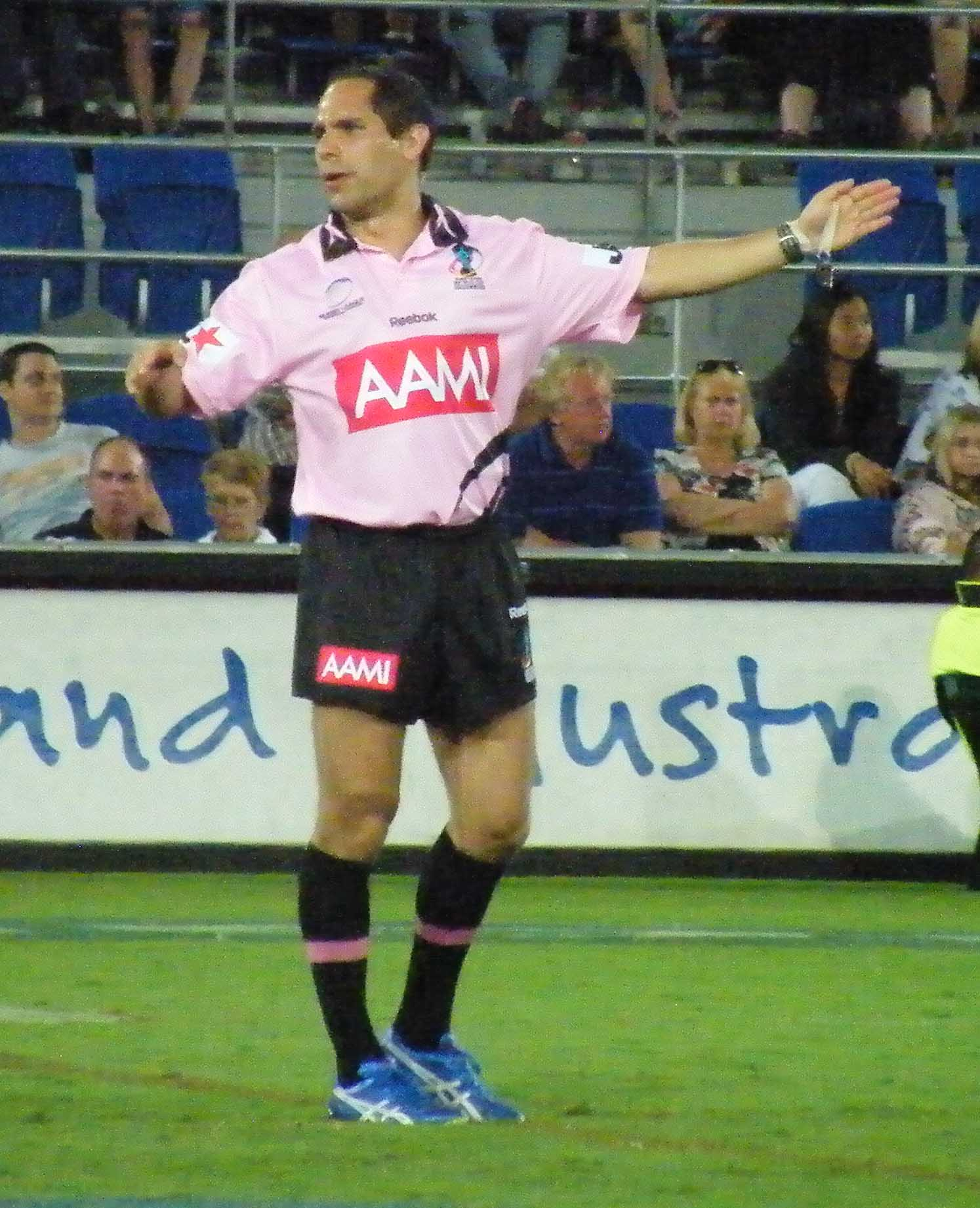
Ashley Klein officated the final.

Ashley Klein officiated the match as head referee; it was Klein's second World Cup final, having also taken charge of the 2008 final in Brisbane. The touch judges were Jack Smith and Warren Turley from the Rugby Football League, Gerard Sutton was the reserve referee, and the video referee and captain's challenge duties were undertaken by Chris Kendall and Grant Atkins respectively.

=== Team selection ===
Australian named an unchanged line-up from their semi-final victory over New Zealand.

Fa'amanu Brown suffered a concussion in the semi-final against England, which saw him miss the final for Samoa. Chanel Harris-Tavita replaced him at hooker in his final rugby league match, with Connelly Lemuelu taking his place on the interchange. Samoan captain Junior Paulo also escaped suspension for a dangerous tackle on Thomas Burgess in the semi-final.

James Tedesco and Junior Paulo captained their respective nations in the final.

=== Support ===
In the lead-up to the match, American actor and former professional wrestler Dwayne Johnson posted on Instagram his support for the Samoan team, as it is their first appearance in a World Cup final. Johnson has Samoan heritage through his mother and grew up playing rugby in his youth. Tua Tagovailoa, the quarterback for the Miami Dolphins in the National Football League, also shared his support for the team.

=== Women's final ===
The match was played as a double-header with the women's final between Australia and New Zealand for the second time in the tournament's history, and the first time in England. Australia won the match 54–4.

=== Entertainment ===
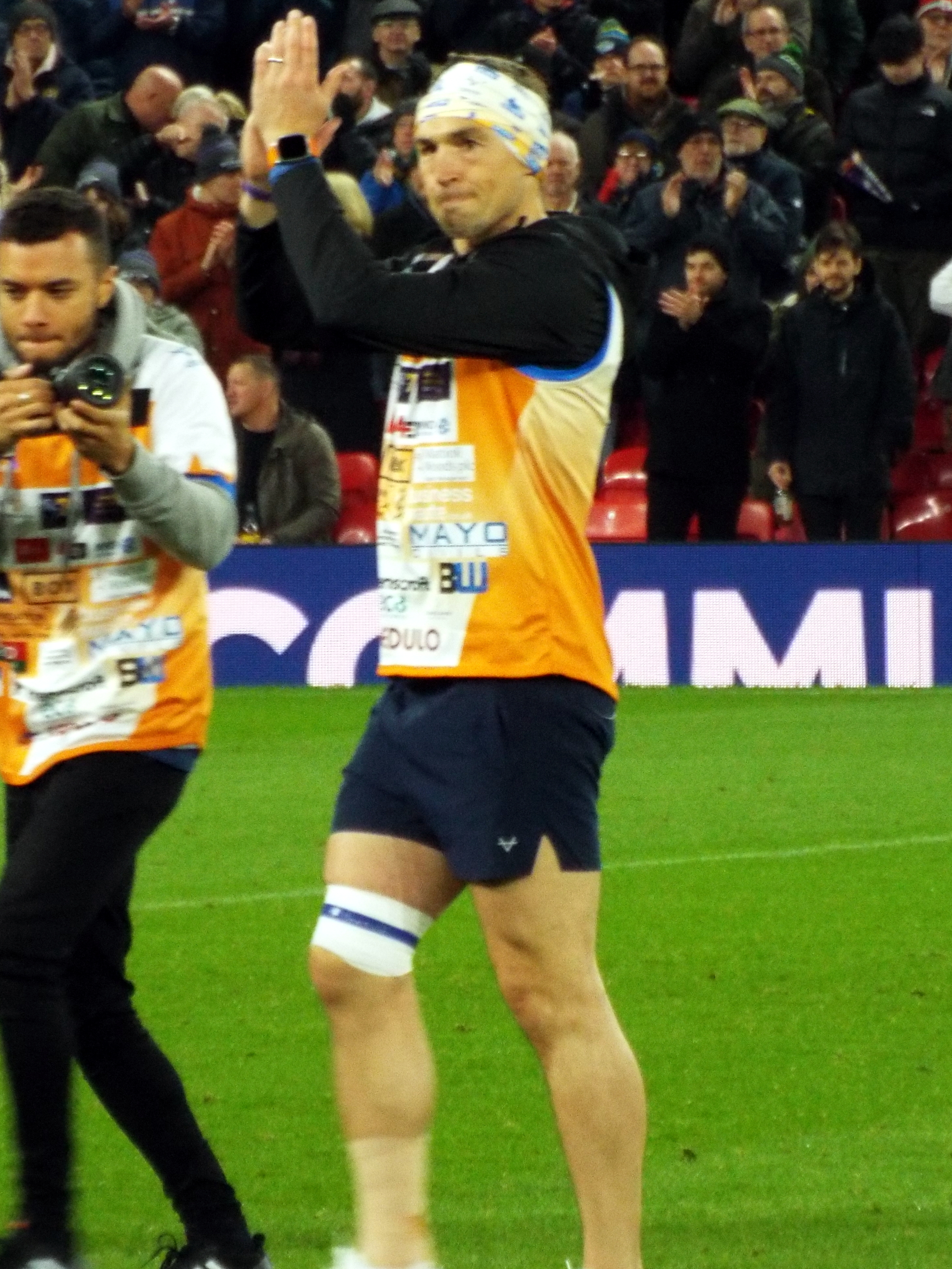
Kevin Sinfield during half-time at the final.

Heather Small, the former lead vocalist of the Manchester-based dance music band M People, performed at half-time and full-time of the men's fixture, as well as bringing out the women's trophy before that match.

Emilia Bertolini performed the national anthem of Australia, but it is unknown who sung the national anthem of Samoa before the match.

Former England captain Kevin Sinfield was welcomed into the stadium at half-time of the match as he completed his Ultra 7 in 7 Challenge marathon raising awareness for motor neuron disease. Sinfield has raised over £5 million for his efforts.

== Match ==
=== Summary ===
==== First half ====
Samoa started the match well with early pressure but Australia's strong defensive performance laid the foundations and more than lived up to their billing as overwhelming favourites. Samoa were unlucky not to have been awarded a 40/20 kick, and despite a competitive start to the match, were hit by two tries in four minutes; Latrell Mitchell breaking the deadlock on 13 minutes before Josh Addo-Carr and Liam Martin extended Australia's lead to 14–0 at half-time.

==== Second half ====
After the break, Angus Crichton was sin-binned for an elbow that ruled out Chanel Harris-Tavita for the remainder of the match with a head injury, but even with a man down Australia added a fourth try through Cameron Murray. Brian To'o scored a consolation for Samoa to make it 20–6, before Tedesco and Stephen Crichton exchanged tries prior to Mitchell rounding up the scoring with his second try in the final minute. The match finished 30–10 with Australia winning their 12th title and third consecutive.

=== Details ===
19 November 2022
16:00 GMT (UTC±00:00)

Australia	30–10	Samoa
Tries: Mitchell (2) 14', 80'; Tedesco (2) 18', 69'; Martin 30'; Murray 53'; Goals: Cleary (3/5) 19', 55', 70'; Addo-Carr (0/1)	Report	Tries: To'o 61'; Crichton 71'; Goals: Crichton (1/2) 63'

Old Trafford, Manchester
Attendance: 67,502
Referee: Ashley Klein (Australia)
Touch judges: Jack Smith (England), Warren Turley (England)
Player of the Match: James Tedesco (Australia)

FB	1	James Tedesco (c)
WG	4	Valentine Holmes
CE	10	Jack Wighton
CE	8	Latrell Mitchell
WG	9	Josh Addo-Carr
FE	7	Cameron Munster
HB	14	Nathan Cleary
PR	5	Jake Trbojevic
HK	3	Ben Hunt
PR	6	Reagan Campbell-Gillard
SR	21	Liam Martin
SR	17	Angus Crichton
LF	24	Isaah Yeo
Interchange:
IN	20	Harry Grant
IN	13	Patrick Carrigan
IN	11	Cameron Murray
IN	18	Tino Fa'asuamaleaui
CS	2	Daly Cherry-Evans
Coach:
(Australia) Mal Meninga

FB	1	Joseph Sua'ali'i
WG	2	Taylan May
CE	25	Tim Lafai
CE	4	Stephen Crichton
WG	5	Brian To'o
FE	6	Jarome Luai
HB	7	Anthony Milford
PR	10	Junior Paulo (c)
HK	20	Chanel Harris-Tavita
PR	15	Royce Hunt
SR	12	Jaydn Su'a
SR	11	Ligi Sao
LF	13	Oregon Kaufusi
Interchange:
IN	22	Kelma Tuilagi
IN	8	Josh Papali'i
IN	16	Spencer Leniu
IN	17	Martin Taupau
CS	26	Ken Sio
Coach:
(Australia) Matt Parish

=== Statistics ===
First half
Statistic	Australia	Samoa
Tries	3	0
Conversions (attempts)	1 (3)	0 (0)
Penalty goals (attempts)	0 (0)	0 (0)
Field goals (attempts)	0 (0)	0 (0)
Possession
Possession	–%	–%
Minutes in possession	–	–
Completion rate	–%	–%
Attack
All runs	–	–
All run metres	–	–
Post contact metres	–	–
Line breaks	–	–
Tackle breaks	–	–
Average set distance	–	–
Kick return metres	–	–
Average ruck speed (sec)	–	–
Passing
Offloads	–	–
Receipts	–	–
Total passes	–	–
Dummy passes	–	–
Kicking
Kicks	–	–
Kicking metres	–	–
Forced drop outs	–	0
Kick defusal	–%	–%
40/20	0	0
Bombs	–	–
Grubbers	–	–
Defence
Tackle efficiency	–%	–%
Tackles made	–	–
Missed tackles	–	–
Intercepts	0	–
Ineffective tackles	–	–
Negative play
Errors	–	–
Penalties conceded	–	–
Ruck infringements	–	–
On report	0	0
Sin bins	0	0
Interchanges
Used	–	–
Head injury assessment	0	–
Reference: NRL Match Centre

Second half
Statistic	Australia	Samoa
Tries	3	2
Conversions (attempts)	2 (3)	1 (2)
Penalty goals (attempts)	0 (0)	0 (0)
Field goals (attempts)	0 (0)	0 (0)
Possession
Possession	–%	–%
Minutes in possession	–	–
Completion rate	–%	–%
Attack
All runs	–	–
All run metres	–	–
Post contact metres	–	–
Line breaks	–	–
Tackle breaks	–	–
Average set distance	–	–
Kick return metres	–	–
Average ruck speed (sec)	–	–
Passing
Offloads	–	–
Receipts	–	–
Total passes	–	–
Dummy passes	–	–
Kicking
Kicks	–	–
Kicking metres	–	–
Forced drop outs	–	0
Kick defusal	–%	–%
40/20	1	0
Bombs	–	–
Grubbers	–	–
Defence
Tackle efficiency	–%	–%
Tackles made	–	–
Missed tackles	–	–
Intercepts	0	–
Ineffective tackles	–	–
Negative play
Errors	–	–
Penalties conceded	–	–
Ruck infringements	–	–
On report	1	0
Sin bins	1	0
Interchanges
Used	–	–
Head injury assessment	0	–
Reference: NRL Match Centre

Overall
Statistic	Australia	Samoa
Tries	6	2
Conversions (attempts)	3 (6)	1 (2)
Penalty goals (attempts)	0 (0)	0 (0)
Field goals (attempts)	0 (0)	0 (0)
Possession
Possession	53%	47%
Minutes in possession	28:06	24:16
Completion rate	70%	72%
Attack
All runs	214	200
All run metres	1,949	1,471
Post contact metres	568	483
Line breaks	9	3
Tackle breaks	45	34
Average set distance	52.69	44.58
Kick return metres	240	69
Average ruck speed (sec)	3.28	3.62
Passing
Offloads	8	20
Receipts	391	371
Total passes	209	205
Dummy passes	14	8
Kicking
Kicks	17	15
Kicking metres	437	491
Forced drop outs	2	0
Kick defusal	50%	60%
40/20	1	0
Bombs	4	2
Grubbers	4	2
Defence
Tackle efficiency	82.31%	84.57%
Tackles made	307	318
Missed tackles	34	45
Intercepts	0	2
Ineffective tackles	32	13
Negative play
Errors	15	10
Penalties conceded	3	1
Ruck infringements	2	3
On report	1	0
Sin bins	1	0
Interchanges
Used	7	7
Head injury assessment	0	2
Reference: NRL Match Centre

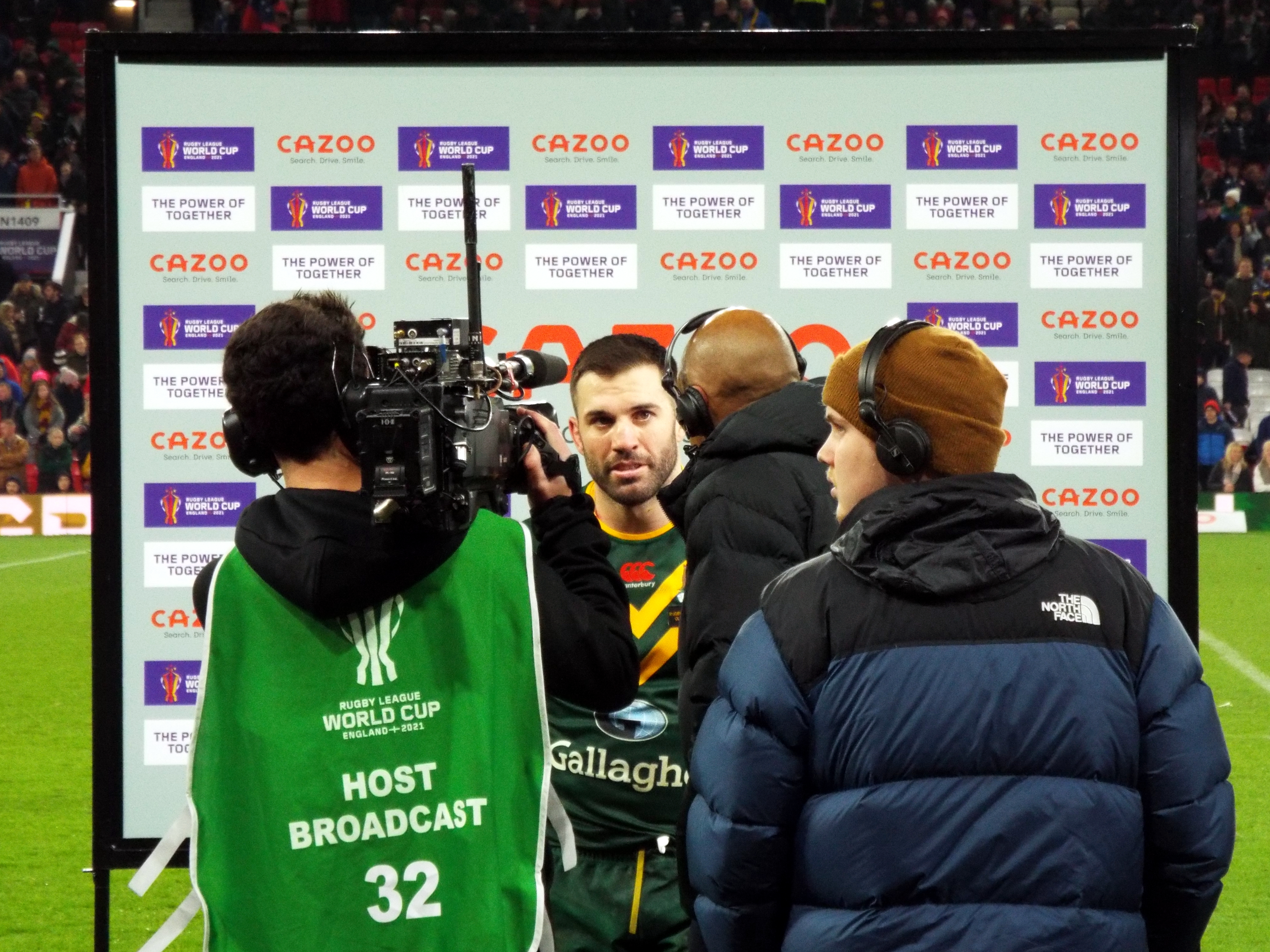
Tedesco post match interview

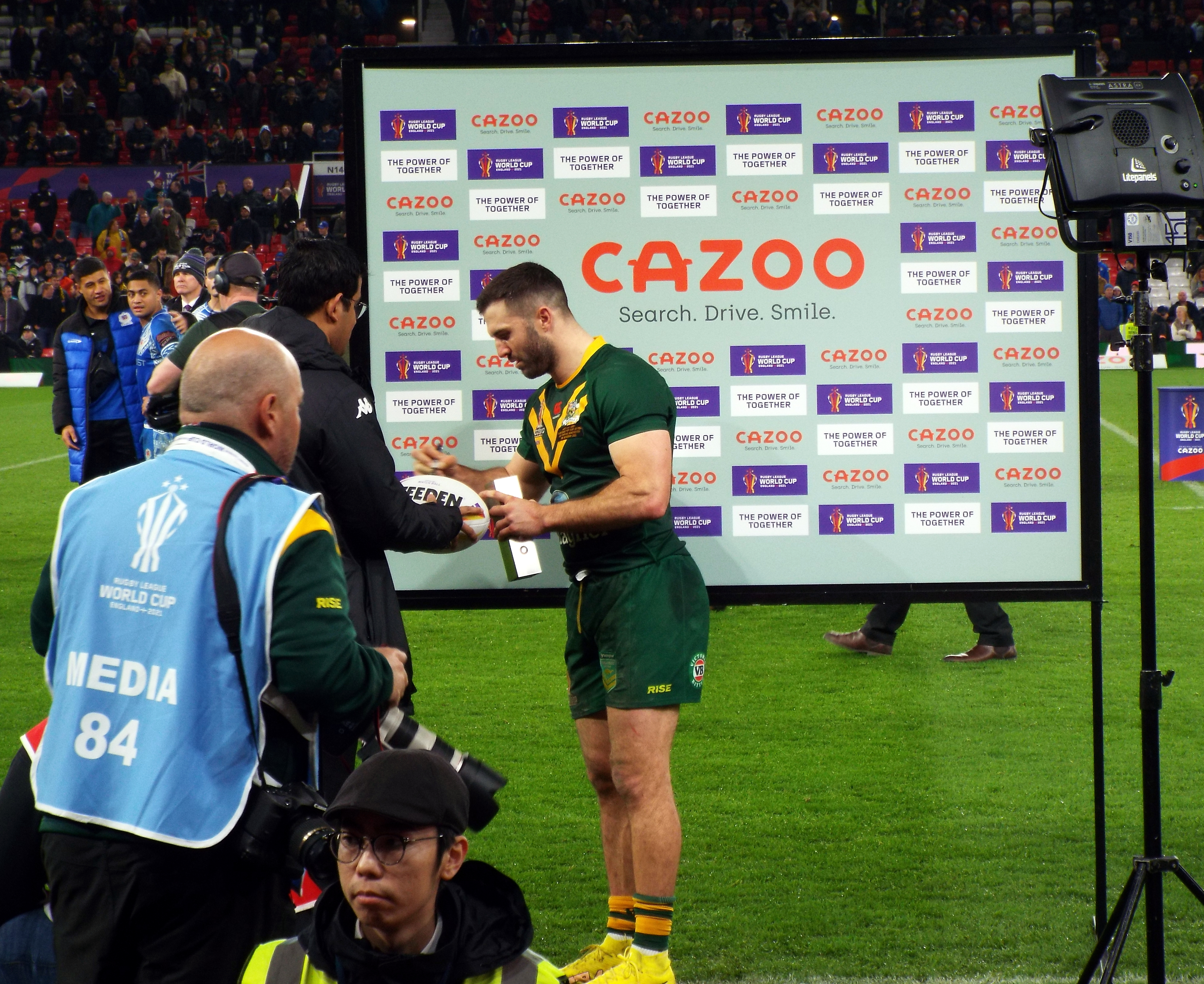
Tedesco with the MOTM award

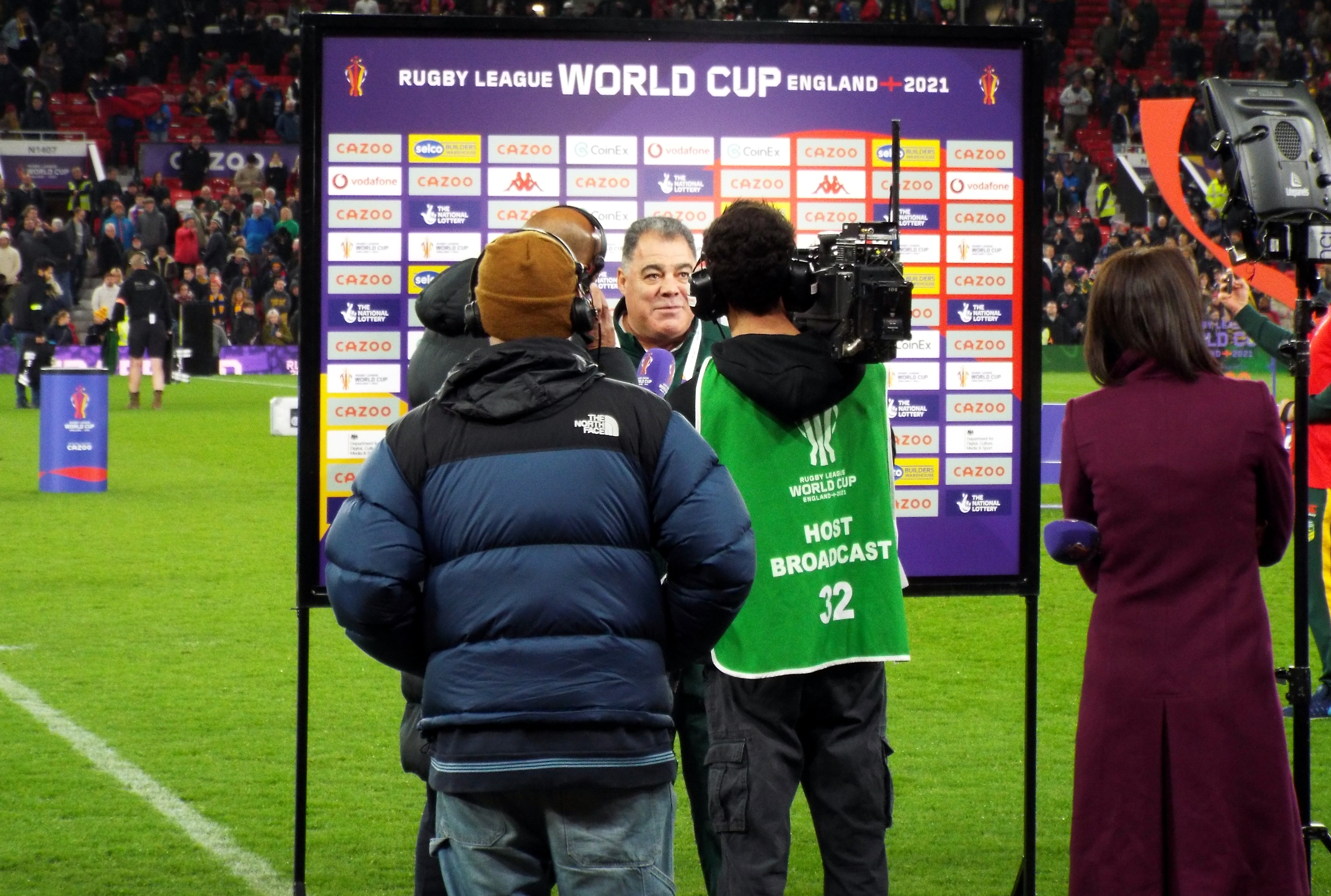
Meninga post match interview

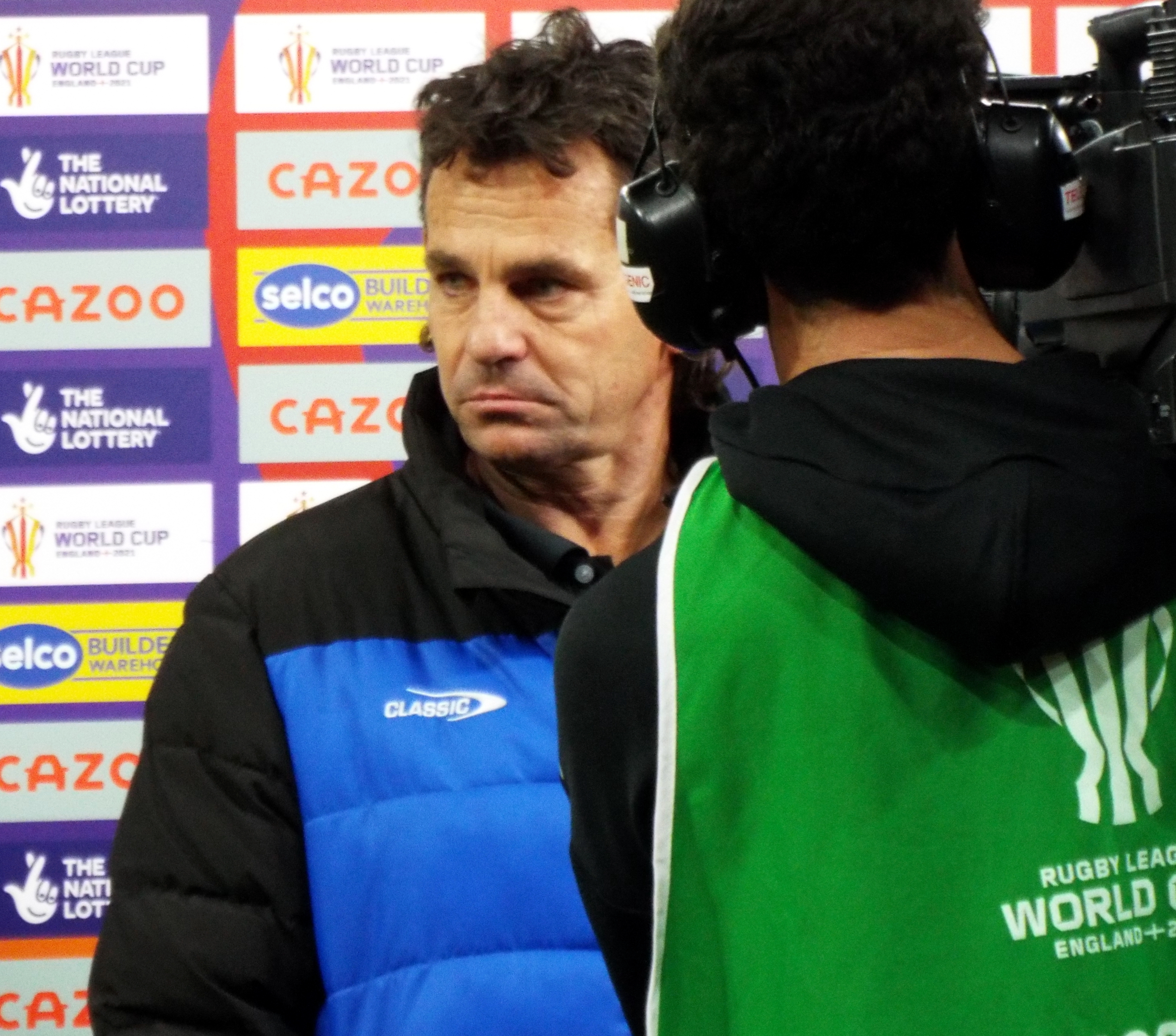
Parish post match

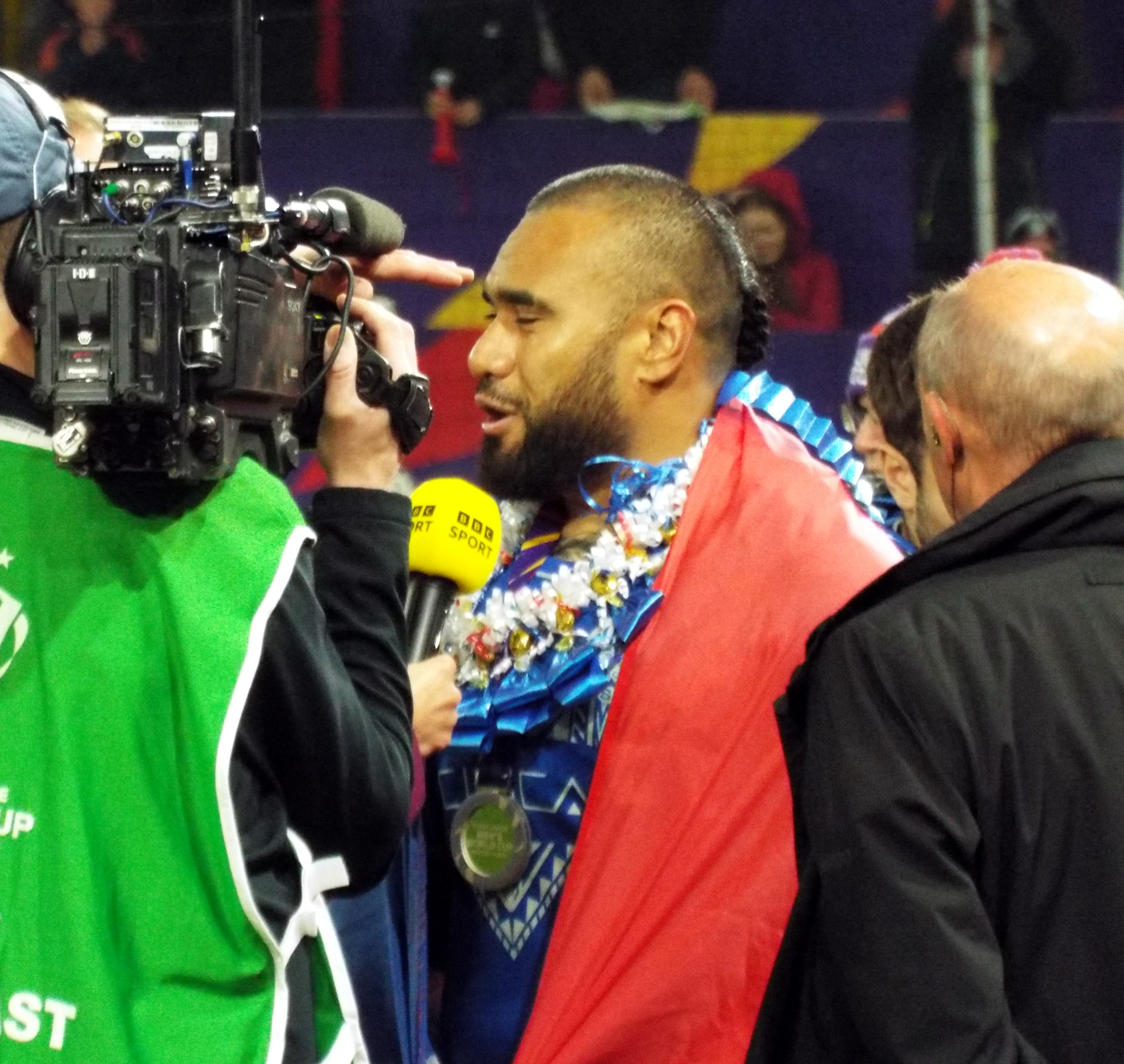
Junior Paulo post match interview

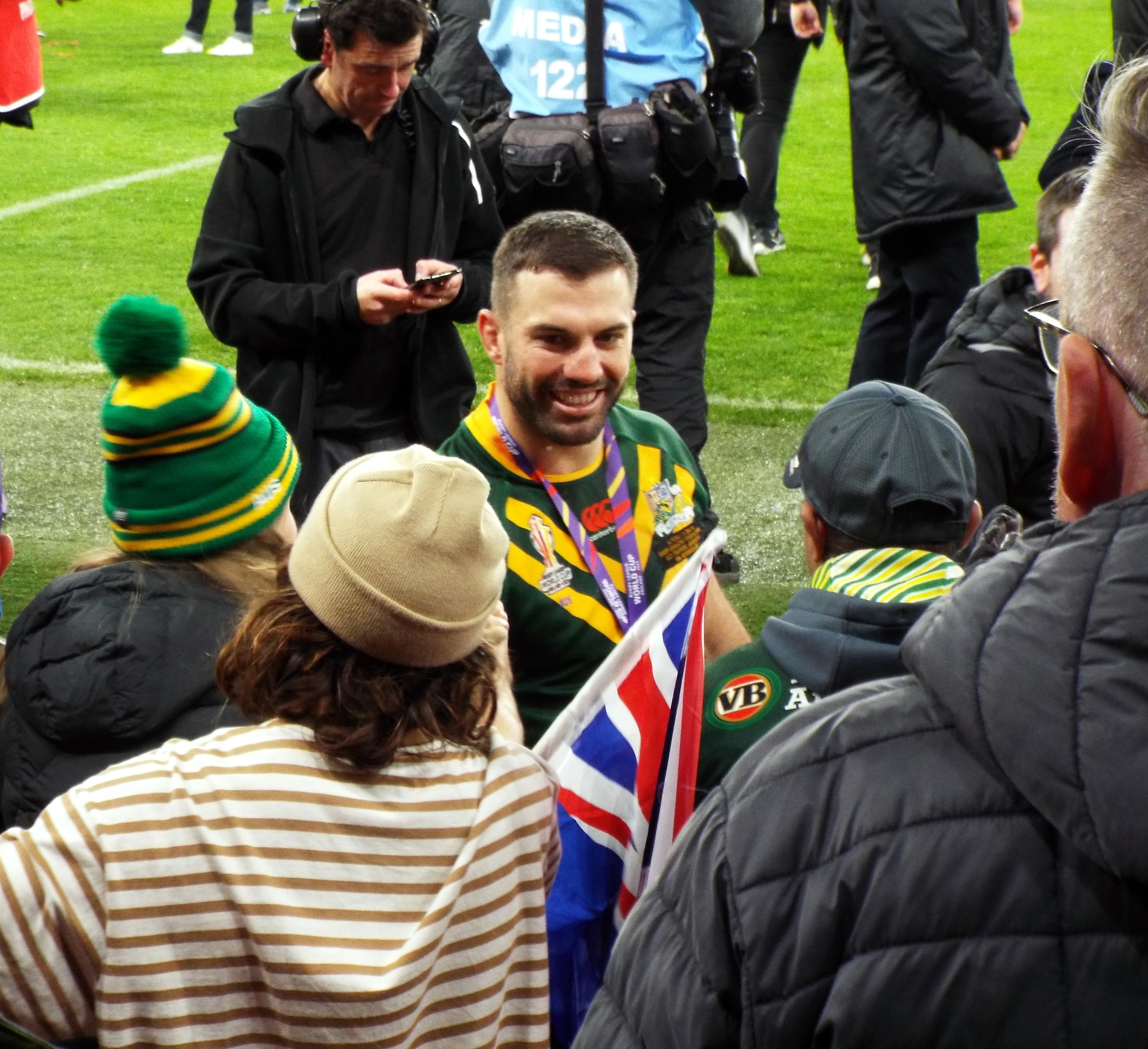
Tedesco celebrating victory with fans

== Post-match ==
James Tedesco was named man of the match for Australia, scoring two tries in the final.

== Broadcasting ==
In Australia, the match was broadcast live on Fox League, with kick-off starting at 03:00 AEDT (UTC+11:00). It had an audience of 151,000, with 51,000 watching the pre-match coverage and 44,000 watching post-game.

== See also ==
- 2021 Women's Rugby League World Cup final
- 2021 Wheelchair Rugby League World Cup final
