= Sebastian Sell =

Greece international rugby league footballer

Playing information
- Position: Second-row
Representative
Years	Team	Pld	T	G	FG	P
2013–	Greece	9	4	0	0	16
- Source: As of 30 October 2022

Sebastian Sell (Greek: Σεβαστιανός Σελλ) is a Greece international rugby league footballer who plays for the Mittagong Lions as a centre.

== Playing career ==
In 2022, Sell was named in the Greece squad for the 2021 Rugby League World Cup, the first ever Greek Rugby League squad to compete in a World Cup.
