= Junior Paulo (rugby league, born 1993) =

Samoa international rugby league footballer

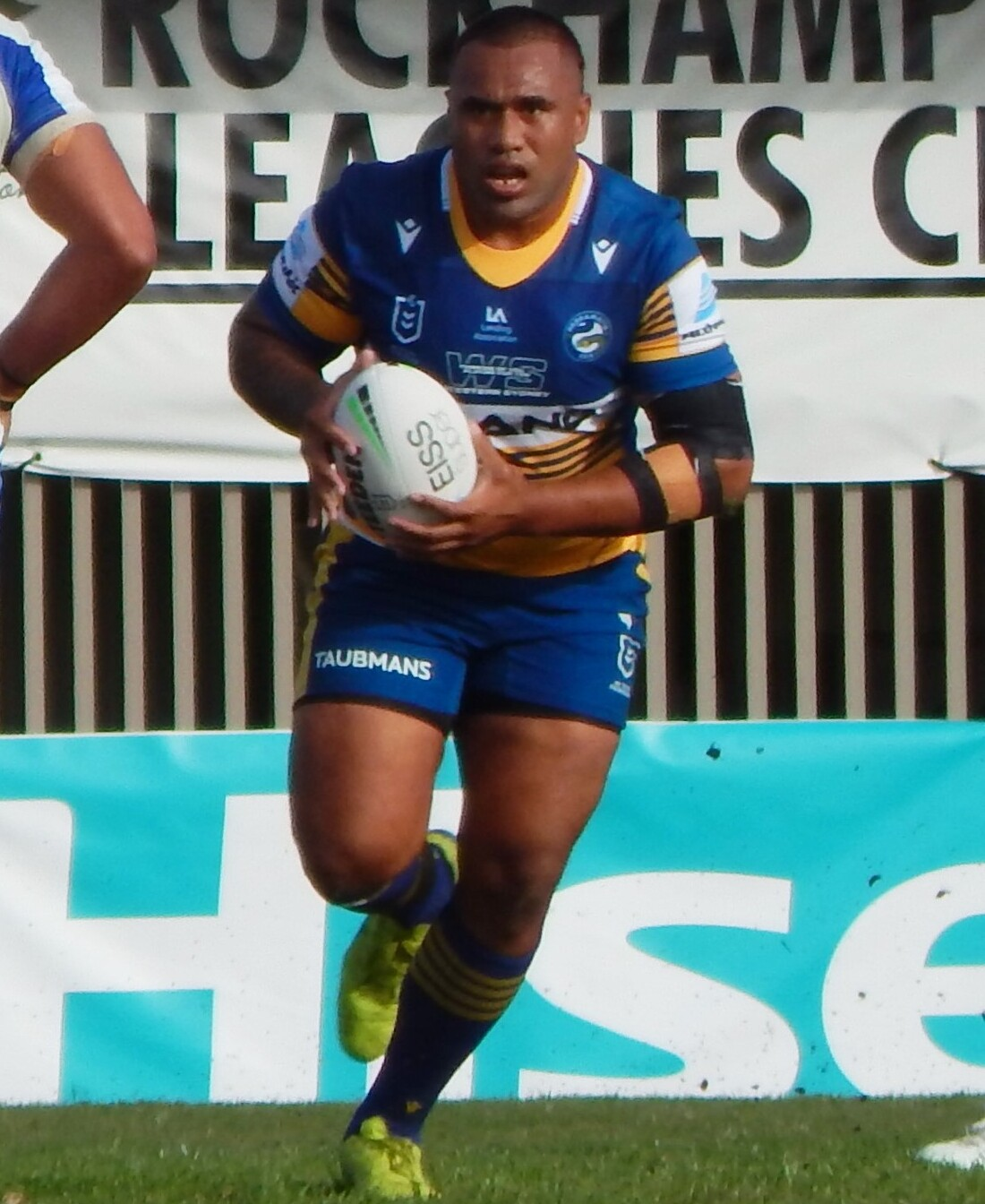

Personal information
- Full name: Peseta Tamailelagi Junior Paulo
- Born: 20 November 1993 (age 33) Auckland, New Zealand
- Height: 185 cm (6 ft 1 in)
- Weight: 110 kg (17 st 5 lb)

Playing information
- Position: Prop
Club
Years	Team	Pld	T	G	FG	P
2013–16	Parramatta Eels	53	6	0	0	24
2016–18	Canberra Raiders	55	2	0	0	8
2019–	Parramatta Eels	172	11	0	0	44
	Total	280	19	0	0	76
Representative
Years	Team	Pld	T	G	FG	P
2016–	Samoa	24	3	0	0	12
2020–23	New South Wales	11	0	0	0	0
- Source: As of 22 November 2026

Junior Paulo (born 20 November 1993) is a Samoa international rugby league footballer who plays as a prop forward for the Parramatta Eels in the National Rugby League.

He previously played for the Canberra Raiders in the NRL. Paulo has also represented New South Wales in the State of Origin series.

== Background ==
Paulo was born in Auckland, New Zealand. He is of Samoan descent, with family links to Safotu.

He played his junior football for the Ashcroft Stallions and the Cabramatta Two Blues, and attended renowned rugby league school Ashcroft High School before being signed by the Parramatta Eels. Paulo played for the Eels NYC team in 2012 and 2013. In 2011, Paulo played for the Australian Schoolboys. On 20 April 2013, Paulo played for the New South Wales U20's team off the interchange bench in the 36–12 win over Queensland at Penrith Stadium.

== Playing career ==
=== 2013 ===
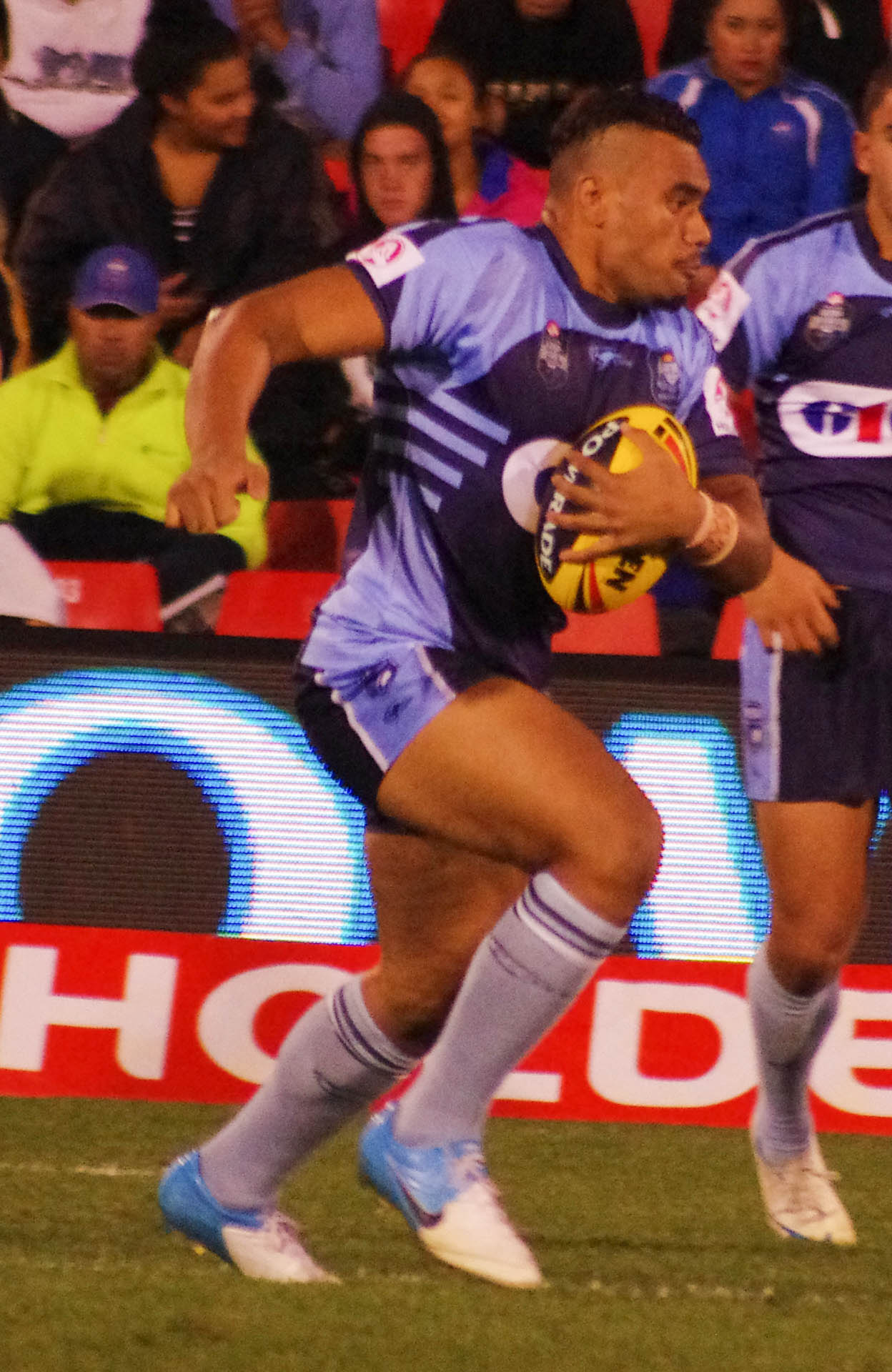
Paulo playing for the NSW under-20s team in 2013

In Round 10 of the 2013 NRL season, Paulo made his NRL debut for the Parramatta Eels against the St. George Illawarra Dragons off the interchange bench in the Eels 32–12 loss at WIN Stadium. On 5 July 2013, Paulo extended his contract with the Parramatta club for a further three-years until the end of the 2016 season. In round 22 against the Wests Tigers, Paulo scored his first NRL career try in the Eels 26–22 win at Parramatta Stadium. Paulo finished his debut year in the NRL with him playing in 11 matches and scoring a try for the Parramatta Eels in the 2013 NRL season.

=== 2014 ===
In May 2014, Paulo was selected for the Samoa national rugby league team to play against Fiji in the 2014 Pacific Rugby League International but was replaced by Carlos Tuimavave.

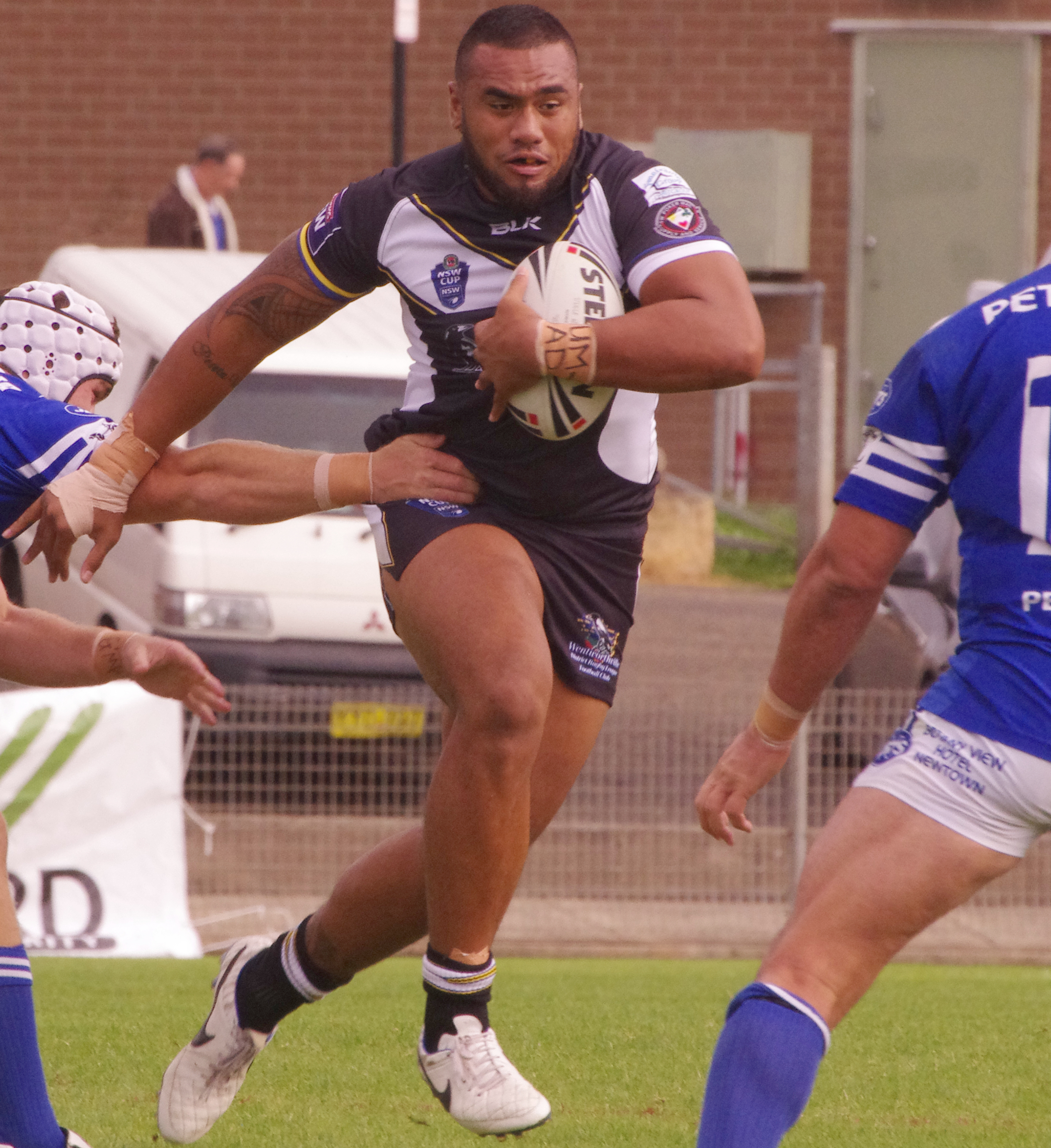
Paulo playing for Wentworthville in the NSW Cup in 2014

Paulo finished off the 2014 NRL season with him playing in 16 matches and scoring a try for the Parramatta Eels.

On 8 September 2014, Paulo was named in the Samoa train-on squad for the 2014 Four Nations, but later didn't make the final 24-man squad.

=== 2015 ===
On 31 January and 1 February, Paulo played for Parramatta in the 2015 NRL Auckland Nines.

In round 1 against the Manly Warringah Sea Eagles, he received a nine-week suspension for his high tackle on Sea Eagles hooker Matt Ballin in the Eels' 42–12 win at Parramatta Stadium. Paulo made his return to the Eels team in round 11 against the South Sydney Rabbitohs in Parramatta's 14–12 loss at ANZ Stadium. He finished off the 2015 season having played in 15 matches and scoring two tries for Parramatta.

On 29 September, he was involved in a road rage incident with a 28-year-old man on the M4 Western Motorway, Paulo was accused of tailgating the other driver before punching him in the face and driving away from the scene after the pair pulled over after both of their vehicles collided with each other. Paulo was later charged with common assault, recklessly damaging property and menacing driving. Paulo will plead not guilty to the charges in court in October 2016.

=== 2016 ===
In February 2016, Paulo played for Parramatta in their 2016 NRL Auckland Nines winning tournament.

On 14 March 2016, Paulo signed a two-year contract with the Canberra Raiders starting in 2017.

On 7 May 2016, Paulo made his international debut for Samoa against Tonga in the 2016 Polynesian Cup.

May 2016 was a turbulent month for Paulo, first he made a cameo for a third-grade Rugby Union team, Oatley, saying that his brother-in-law who is the coach of team wanted him to fill in the team and Paulo did as a favour, signing under a fake name and worn headgear in an attempt to hope that nobody would recognise him. After the bizarre Rugby cameo, Paulo alongside Corey Norman, and Panthers hooker James Segeyaro were issued with warnings from NSW police for consorting with convicted criminals. On 29 May 2016, he was released effectively immediately from his Parramatta contract to join Canberra early.

In Round 13, Paulo made his club debut for Canberra against the Manly Warringah Sea Eagles, where he started at prop in the 30–18 win at Canberra Stadium. Paulo would go on to play in 13 matches for the Raiders for the rest of the 2016 NRL season. On 26 September 2016, Paulo was named in the 2016 Australia Kangaroos train-on squad for the 2016 Four Nations but later didn't make the final 24-man squad.

On 8 October 2016, Paulo played for Samoa against Fiji, starting at prop in the 20–18 loss in Apia, Samoa.

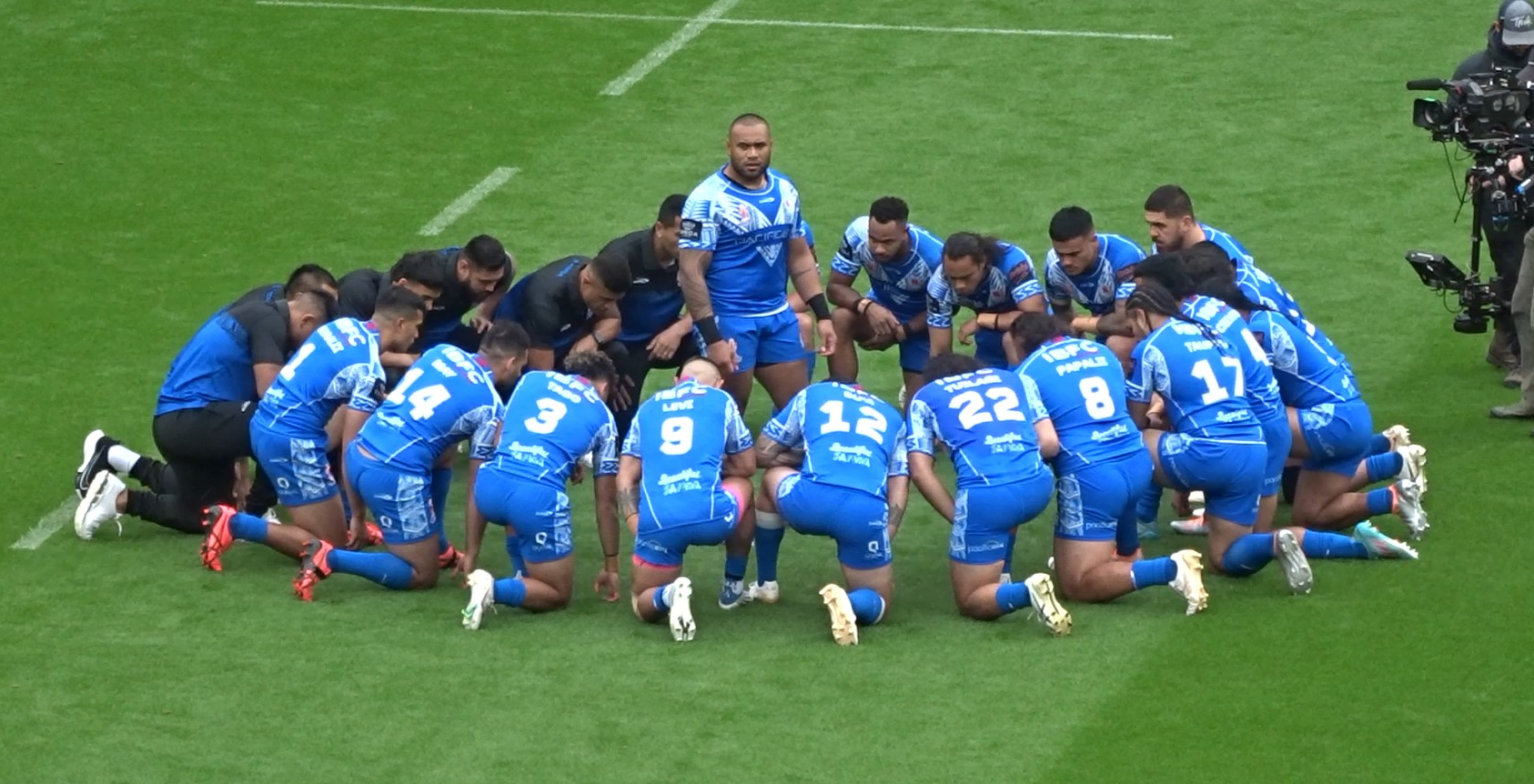
Paulo leading the Siva Tau in 2022

On 8 December 2016, Paulo participated in the Ladbrokes Star of the Ring Charity Fight Night at the Hordern Pavilion, where he went up against Cronulla-Sutherland Sharks captain Paul Gallen but lost in a unanimous decision.

=== 2017 ===
On 7 February 2017, Paulo was suspended by the NRL integrity unit following his common assault and reckless driving convictions he received in 2016.

He was banned for round 1 in Canberra's season opener against the North Queensland Cowboys, participating in the Auckland Nines tournament and being selected in the World All Stars team.

On 6 May 2017, Paulo played for Samoa in the test against England, starting at prop in the 30–10 loss at Campbelltown Stadium.

In round 25 against the Newcastle Knights, Paulo scored his first club try for Canberra in the 46–28 win at Canberra Stadium. Paulo finished the 2017 NRL season with him playing in 23 matches and scoring one try for the Canberra side. On 11 September 2017, Paulo was awarded with the Mal Meninga Medal for being the Raiders Player of the Year.

On 6 October 2017, Paulo was selected in the 24-man squad for Samoa in the 2017 Rugby League World Cup. In Samoa's third pool match against Scotland, Paulo scored his first international try for Samoa in the 14–14 all draw at Barlow Park in Cairns. Paulo played in all 4 matches, starting at prop and scored 1 try in Samoa's disappointing campaign.

=== 2018 ===
On 19 April 2018, Paulo signed a four-year deal to rejoin Parramatta at the end of the season on a deal worth $2.8 million.

=== 2019 ===
Paulo marked his return to Parramatta in round 2 against arch-rivals Canterbury-Bankstown which ended in a 36–16 victory.

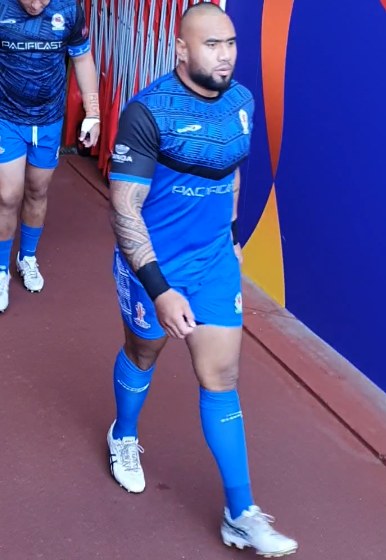
Paulo leading Samoa out for the warm up at the 2021 RLWC in 2022

Paulo made a total of 24 appearances for Parramatta in the 2019 NRL season as the club finished 5th on the table and qualified for the finals. Paulo played in both of the club's finals matches as they were eliminated in the second week by Melbourne losing 32–0 at AAMI Park.

=== 2020 ===
In round 18 of the 2020 NRL season, Paulo played his 150th first grade game which ended in a 20-2 defeat against Penrith at Penrith Park.

After a good season for Parramatta, Paulo was selected by New South Wales for the 2020 State of Origin series. Paulo played all three games as New South Wales suffered a shock 2-1 series defeat against Queensland.

=== 2021 ===
In round 1 of the 2021 NRL season, Paulo scored the winning try in Parramatta's 24-16 victory over Brisbane.

On 30 May, he was selected for game one of the 2021 State of Origin series.

On 21 June, he was selected as one of the two starting props in the 2021 State of Origin series.

In Parramatta’s semifinal against Penrith, with Penrith leading 8–6 with less than one minute on the clock, Paulo dropped the ball just out in front of Penrith’s try line effectively ending Parramatta’s season. On 17 December, Paulo signed a new four-year deal with Parramatta to remain at the club until the end of the 2026 season.

=== 2022 ===
In round 5 of the 2022 NRL season, Paulo was sent to the sin bin for a high tackle on Gold Coast's Alexander Brimson during Parramatta's 26-20 victory. Paulo was subsequently banned for one match.

On 29 May, Paulo was selected by New South Wales to play in game one of the 2022 State of Origin series. Paulo played in all three matches of the series which saw Queensland win 2-1.

Paulo played 26 games for Parramatta in the 2022 season including the clubs Grand Final loss to Penrith.

In October, Paulo was named in the Samoa squad for the 2021 Rugby League World Cup.

Paulo played every game for Samoa at the tournament including the final where they were beaten 30-10 by Australia. Paulo became the first player in history to be on the losing side in the State of Origin deciding match, the NRL Grand final and the Rugby League World Cup final during a calendar year.

In November, he was named in the 2021 RLWC Team of the Tournament.

=== 2023 ===
In round 4 of the 2023 NRL season, Paulo was sent to the sin bin during golden point extra-time against Penrith due to a dangerous high tackle. Parramatta would win the match 17-16. Paulo was later suspended for two matches over the incident. On 22 May, Paulo was selected by New South Wales for game one of the 2023 State of Origin series. Paulo played in the first two games of the series but was not selected for game three. Paulo played a total of 20 games for Parramatta in the 2023 NRL season as the club finished 10th and missed the finals.

=== 2024 ===
Following Parramatta's loss against South Sydney in round 18 of the 2024 NRL season, it was announced that Paulo would be ruled out for at least eight weeks with a lisfranc injury. Paulo played a total of 16 games for Parramatta in 2024 as the club finished 15th on the table.

=== 2025 ===
In round 12 of the 2025 NRL season, Paulo played his 250th first grade game in Parramatta's 30-10 victory over Manly. In round 19, Paulo played his 200th first grade game for Parramatta in the clubs 32-10 loss against Penrith. Paulo became only the 14th player in Parramatta's history to reach 200 games. Paulo played every game for Parramatta in the 2025 NRL season as the club finished 11th on the table.

=== 2026 ===
On 26 May, it was announced Paulo would be ruled out for around two months after needing knee surgery. Paulo played 17 matches for Parramatta in the 2026 NRL season as the club finished 13th on the table. On 15 October 2026, the Eels announced Paulo had re-signed with the club for a further year.

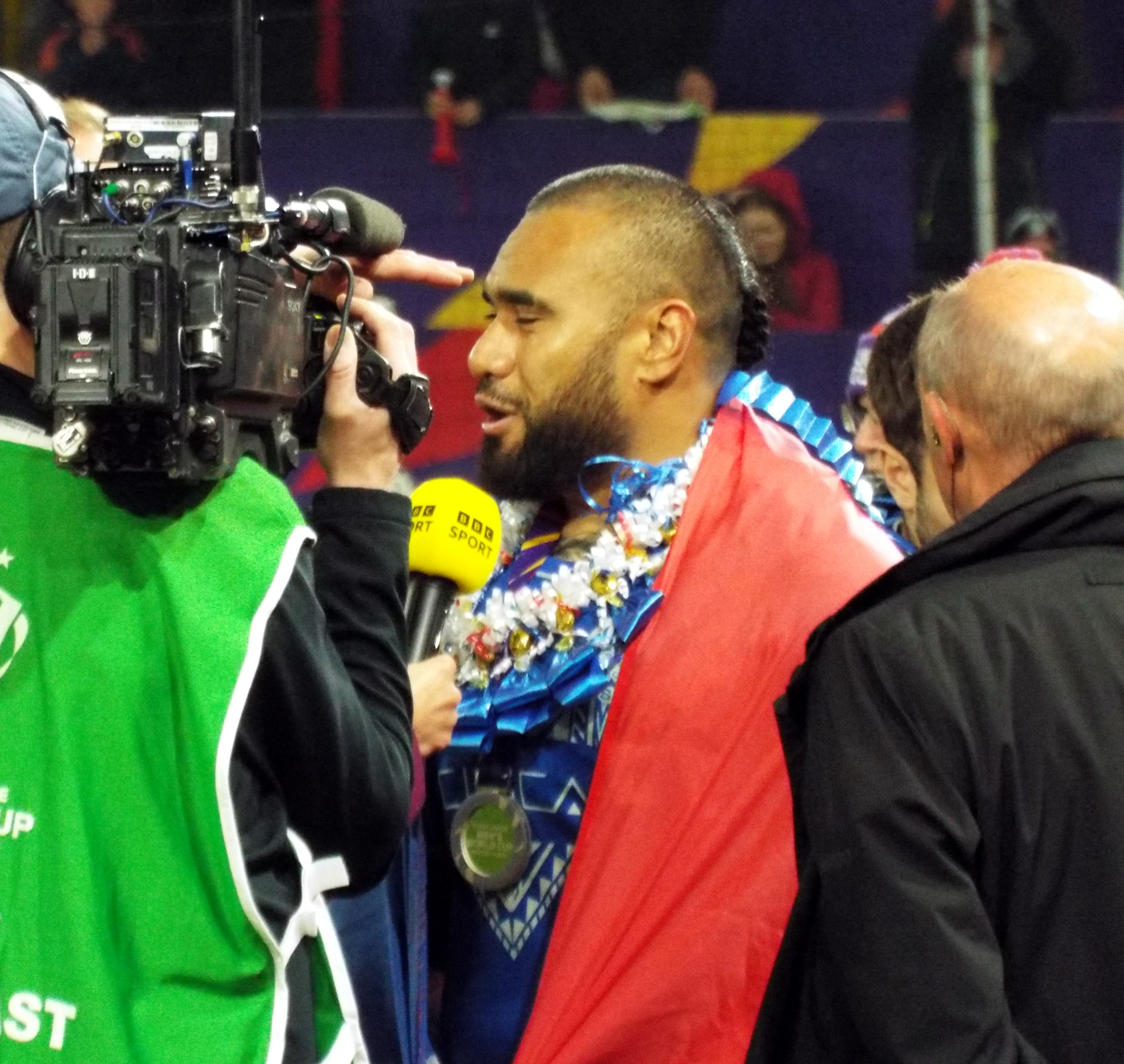
Junior Paulo post match interview after the 2021 Rugby League World Cup Final loss at Old Trafford in 2022

== Statistics ==
Year	Club	Games	Tries	Pts
2013	Parramatta Eels	11	1	4
2014	Parramatta Eels	16	1	4
2015	Parramatta Eels	15	2	8
2016	Canberra Raiders	24	2	8
2017	Canberra Raiders	23	1	4
2018	Canberra Raiders	19	1	4
2019	Parramatta Eels	24	1	4
2020	Parramatta Eels	22	0	0
2021	Parramatta Eels	23	2	8
2022	Parramatta Eels	26	1	4
2023	Parramatta Eels	21	3	12
2024	Parramatta Eels	16	2	8
2025	Parramatta Eels	24	1	4
2026	Parramatta Eels	17	1	4
2027	Parramatta Eels			
	Totals	280	19	76

*denotes season competing

== Professional Boxing Record ==
0 Wins, 1 Loss, 0 Draws
Res.	Record	Opponent	Type	Rd., Time	Date	Location	Notes
Loss	0–1	(Australia) Paul Gallen	UD	4	2016-12-6	(Australia) Hordern Pavilion, Sydney	Professional debut.
