= Chaise Robinson =

Greece international rugby league footballer

Personal information
- Born: 4 October 2001 (age 23); Sydney, New South Wales, Australia
- Height: 179 cm (5 ft 10 in)
- Weight: 83 kg (13 st 1 lb)

Playing information
- Position: Fullback, Five-eighth
Representative
Years	Team	Pld	T	G	FG	P
2019–	Greece	4	3	0	0	12
- Source: As of 30 October 2022
- Other names: Chaise Spyroulias

Chaise Robinson is a Greece international rugby league footballer who plays as a Fullback for the South Sydney Rabbitohs in the NSW Cup.

== Playing career ==
In 2022, Robinson was named in the Greece squad for the 2021 Rugby League World Cup, the first ever Greek Rugby League squad to compete in a World Cup.
