= The Banner of Freedom =

National anthem of Samoa

Sāmoa Tulaʻi
- National anthem of Samoa
- Lyrics: Sauni Iiga Kuresa
- Music: Sauni Iiga Kuresa
- Adopted: 1962

Instrumental recording of the anthem

"The Banner of Freedom" (Samoan: "O Le Fuʻa o Le Saʻolotoga o Sāmoa" [o‿le fuʔa o‿le saʔolotoŋa o saːmoa]), known also as "Sāmoa Tulaʻi" ([saːmoa tulaʔi]; "Samoa, Arise") is the national anthem of Samoa. Both the words (which reference the country's flag) and the music were composed by Sauni Iiga Kuresa. The anthem was composed in response to a public competition to select a new anthem when the United Nations conferred self-government on Samoa in 1948 and was chosen from among 15 entries. It was performed publicly for the first time on 1 June 1948 and was subsequently played at all public ceremonies attended by the High Commissioner and performed after "God Save the Queen" on official occasions. It was retained as the national anthem upon Samoa's gaining of independence from New Zealand in 1962.

The anthem is recognised by the Official Flag and National Anthem of Samoa Act 1994. When it is sung or played in public, people and vehicles must stop and remain stationary until the performance is complete.

== Lyrics ==
=== Samoan original ===
Samoan original

𝄆 Sāmoa, tūlaʻi ma sīsīʻia lau fuʻa, lou pale lea! 𝄇
Vaʻai i nā fētū o lō ua āgiagia ai: (Note: Also written Vaʻai i nā fētū o lō ua agiagia ai.)
Le faʻailoga lea o Iesu na maliu ai mo Sāmoa (Note: Also written O le faʻailoga lea o Iesu na maliu ai mo Sāmoa or Le fa'ailoga lea o Sāmoa ua mafai ona tautai.)
ʻOi, Sāmoa e, uʻu mau lau pule ia faʻavavau.
ʻAua e te fefe; o le Atua o lō tā faʻavae, o lō tā saʻolotoga.
Sāmoa, tulaʻi; ua āgiagia lau fuʻa lou pale lea.

IPA transcription (Note: See Help:IPA and Samoan language § Phonology.)

𝄆 [saː.mo.a tu.la.ʔi ma si.si i.a lau̯ fu.ʔa lou̯ pa.le le.a] 𝄇
[va.ʔai̯ i naː fe.tu o lo.ʔo u.a‿aː.ŋi.a.ŋi.a ai̯]
[le fa.ʔai̯.lo.ŋa le.a o i̯e.su na.ma.liu̯ (ai̯) mo saː.moa̯]
[oi̯ saː.mo.a‿e̯ u.ʔu ma.u lau̯ pu.le i̯a fa.ʔa.va.va.u]
[ʔau̯.a e te fe.fe o le a.tu.a lo taː fa.ʔa vae̯]
[ʔo loː taː sa.ʔo.lo.to.ŋa]
[saː.mo.a tu.la.ʔi u.a aː.ŋi.a.ŋi.a lau̯ fu.ʔa lou̯ pa.le le.a]

=== English translations ===
Literal translation

𝄆 Samoa, arise and raise your flag, your crown! 𝄇
Look at those stars that are waving on it:
This is the symbol of Jesus, who died on it for Samoa.
Oh, Samoa, hold fast your power forever.
Do not be afraid; God is our foundation, our freedom.
Samoa, arise; your flag is waving, your crown!

Common translation

𝄆 Samoa, arise and raise your banner that is your crown! 𝄇
Oh! See and behold the stars on the waving banner!
They are a sign that Samoa is able to lead.
Oh! Samoa, hold fast your freedom forever!
Do not be afraid; as you are founded on God;
Our treasured precious liberty.
Samoa, arise and wave your banner that is your crown!
