= 2021 Women's Rugby League World Cup final =

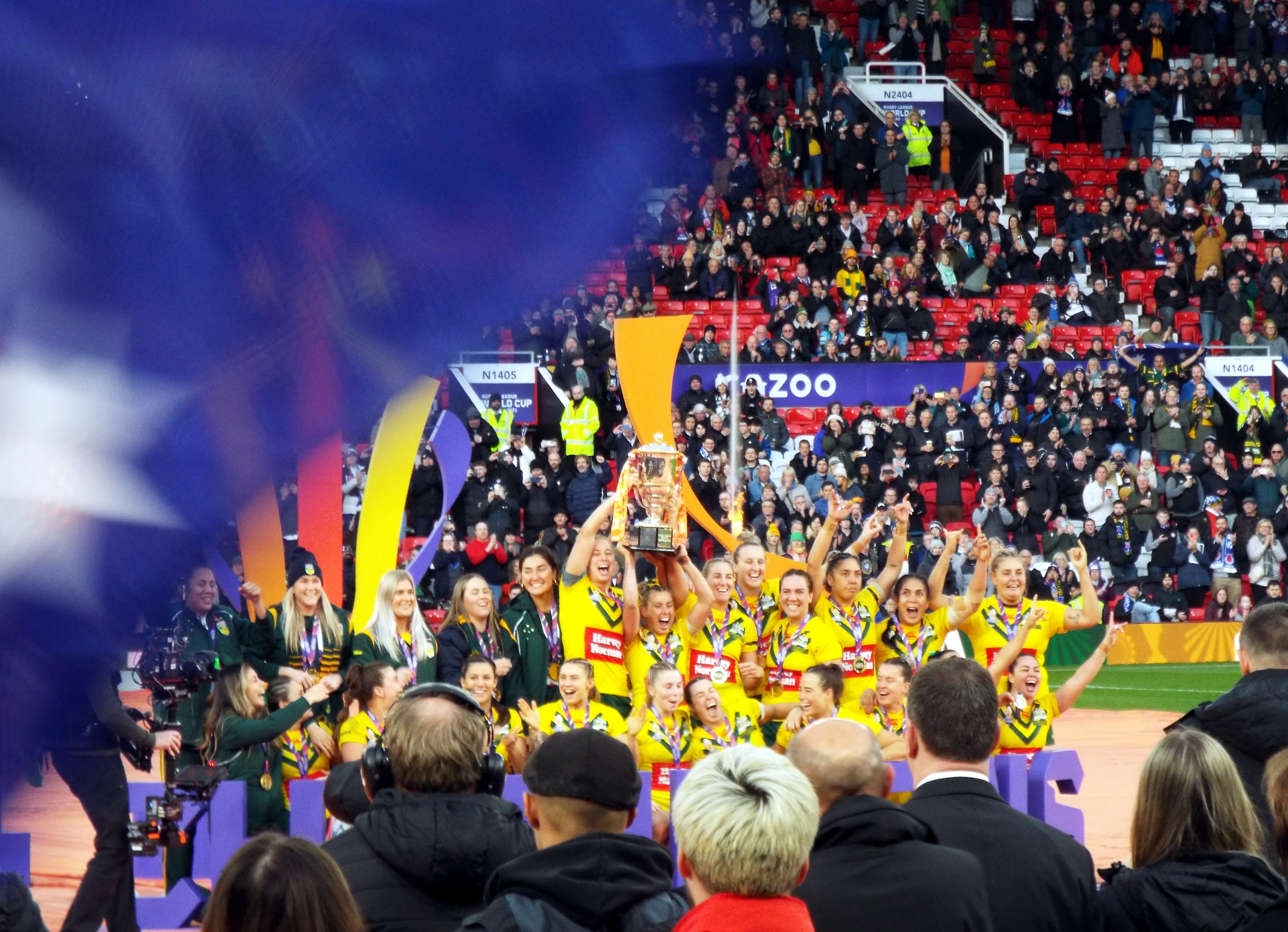
Australia	New Zealand
(ARL)	(NZRL)
54	4
	1	2	Total
AUS	20	34	54
NZL	0	4	4
- Date: 19 November 2022
- Stadium: Old Trafford
- Location: Manchester, England
- Player of the Match: Ali Brigginshaw
- Referee: Belinda Sharpe (Australia)
- Attendance: 67,502 (Note: Joint attendance figure with the Men's final)

Broadcast partners
- Broadcasters: BBC (United Kingdom); Fox League (Australia)

The 2021 Women's Rugby League World Cup final was the rugby league match to determine the winner of the 2021 Women's Rugby League World Cup, played between the two finalists on 19 November 2022 at Old Trafford in Manchester, England.

== Venue ==
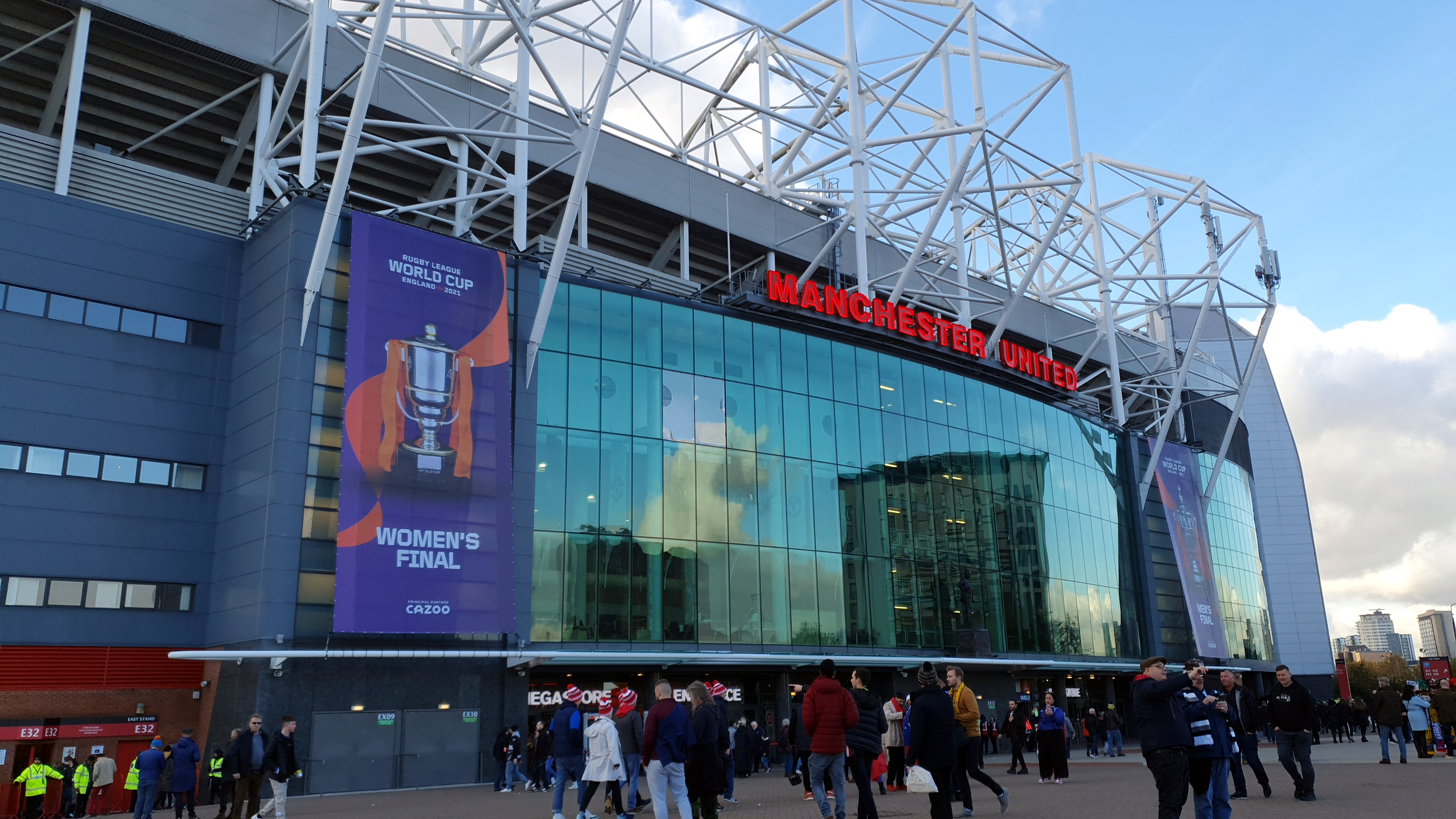
Outside Old Trafford ahead of hosting the Women's World Cup final for the first time

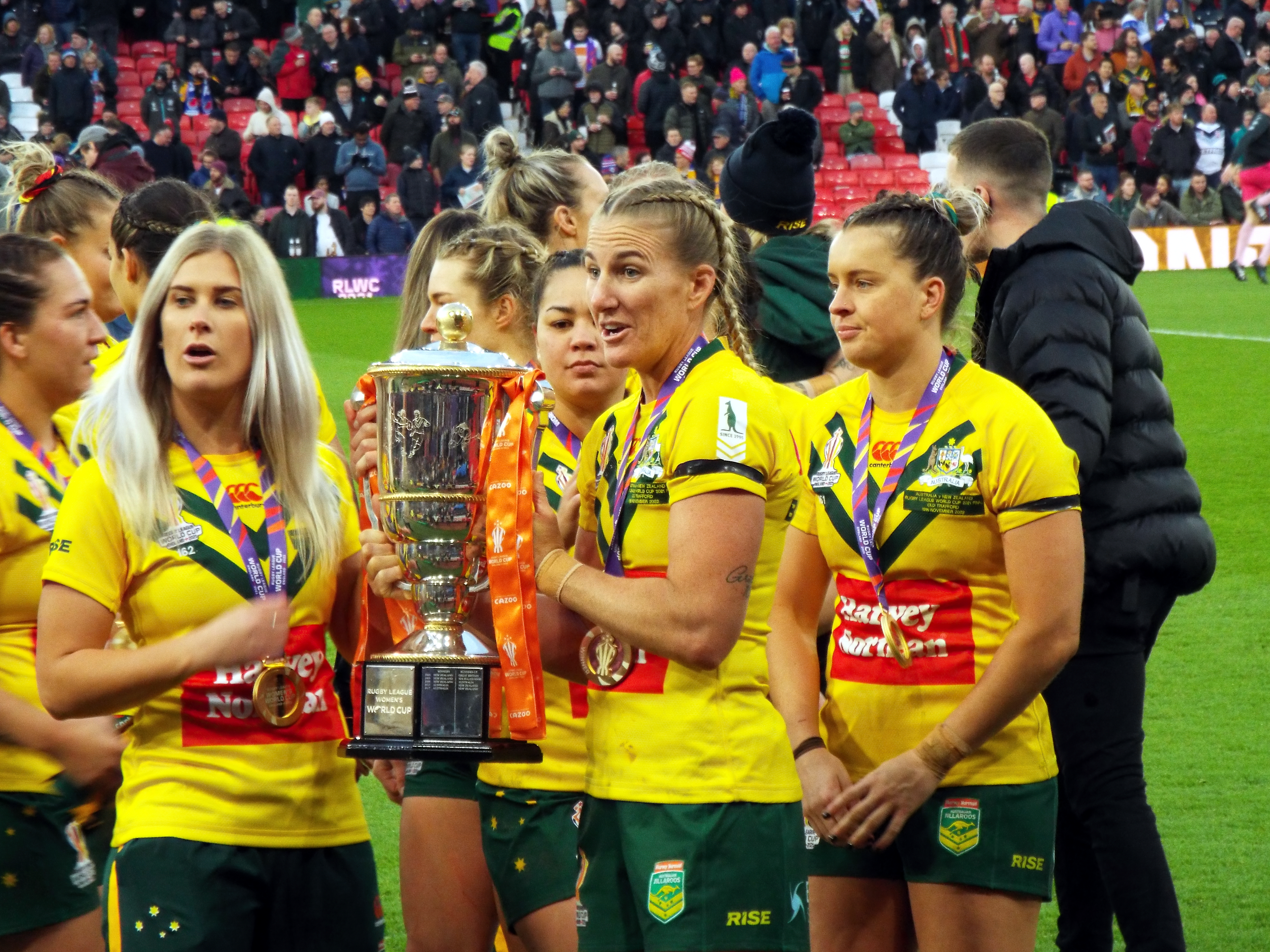
Australia team members with the 2021 Women's Rugby League World Cup

Old Trafford hosted the Women's World Cup final for the first time. The ground has hosted the men's final twice in 2000, 2013, and hosted the 2021 Men's Final as well. It was confirmed as the venue to host the final on 10 June 2020, when the fixture for the event was released.

The ground is often used for major rugby league matches, being the primary venue for the annual Super League Grand Final, which is the championship-deciding game of Britain's Super League competition, and top-tier test matches such as Great Britain games Kangaroo tours.

The ground is the home stadium of English football team Manchester United, and has a capacity of 74,310, which makes it the largest club football stadium (second-largest football stadium overall after Wembley Stadium, and third largest on total with the rugby union Twickenham Stadium coming in second) in the United Kingdom, and the eleventh-largest in Europe.

== Route to the final ==
=== Australia ===
Group Stage

- Cook Islands: 74–0
- France: 92–0
- New Zealand: 10–8

Semi-final

- Papua New Guinea: 82–0

=== New Zealand ===
Group Stage

- France: 46–0
- Cook Islands: 34–4
- Australia: 8–10

Semi-final

- England: 20–6

== Match ==
19 November 2022
13:15 GMT (UTC±00:00)

Australia	54–4	New Zealand
Tries: Sergis (2) 4', 51'; Kelly (2) 14', 35'; Robinson 26'; Tonegato 48'; Aiken 56'; Cherrington (2) 66', 69'; Pelite 72'; Goals: Brigginshaw (2/5) 6', 70'; Brown (5/5) 36', 49', 52', 57', 67'	Report	Tries: Bartlett 64'; Goals: R. McGregor (0/1)

Old Trafford, Manchester
Attendance: 67,502
Referee: Belinda Sharpe (Australia)
Touch judges: Wyatt Raymond (Australia), Darian Furner (Australia)
Player of the Match: Ali Brigginshaw (Australia)

Team details
Australia		Position	New Zealand
Name	Number	Position	Number	Name
Samantha Bremner	2	Fullback	1	Nicholls-Pualau
Julia Robinson	10	Wing	3	Autumn-Rain Stephens-Daly
Jessica Sergis	11	Centre	24	Mele Hufanga
Isabelle Kelly	5	Centre	4	Page McGregor
Evania Pelite	24	Wing	5	Madison Bartlett
Tarryn Aiken	12	Stand off/Five eighth	15	Abigail Roache
Ali Brigginshaw	3	Scrum half/Half back	7	Raecene McGregor
Shannon Mato	23	Prop forward	23	Brianna Clark
Keeley Davis	8	Hooker	9	Krystal Rota
Kennedy Cherrington	16	Prop forward	10	Annetta Nu'uausala
Yasmin Clydsdale	18	Second row	11	Roxy Murdoch-Masila
Kezie Apps	1	Second row	12	Amber Hall
Simaima Taufa	4	Loose forward/Lock forward	13	Georgia Hale
Lauren Brown	14	Interchange	14	Nita Maynard
Emma Tonegato	6	Interchange	8	Mya Hill-Moana
Shaylee Bent	13	Interchange	18	Otesa Pule
Caitlan Johnston	20	Interchange	17	Christyl Stowers
Brad Donald		Coach		Ricky Henry

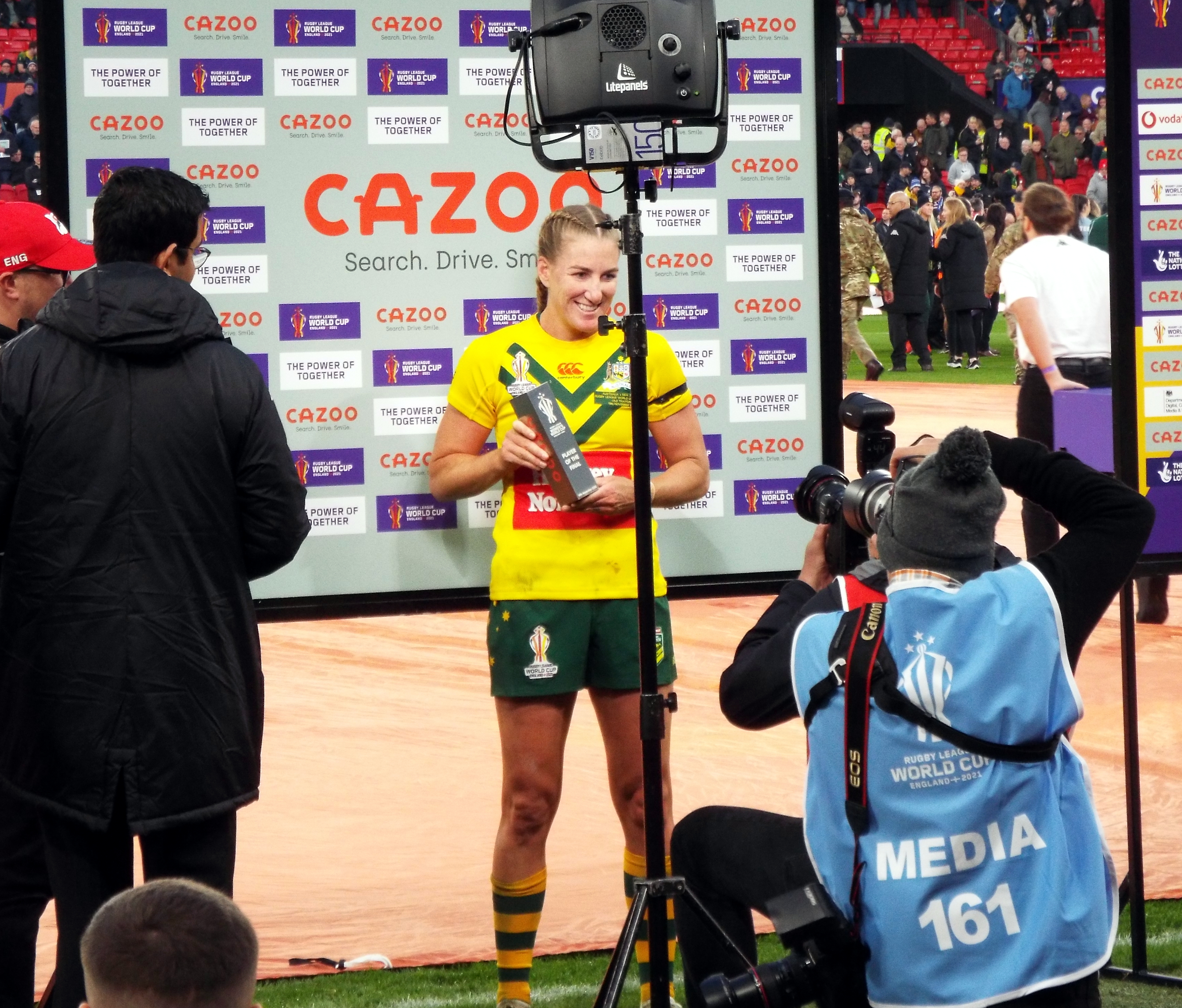
PotM Ali Brigginshaw being interviewed after the game

== Post match ==
=== Men's final ===
The women's final was played as a double header men's final for the second time in the tournament's history.

== See also ==
- 2021 Wheelchair Rugby League World Cup final
