= 2016 New Zealand rugby league season =

Seasons
- 2015 2017

The 2016 New Zealand rugby league season was the 109th season of rugby league that had been played in New Zealand. The main feature of the year was the re-formatted National Competition, run by the New Zealand Rugby League. The competition was won by the Akarana Falcons.

== International competitions ==
The New Zealand national rugby league team played in the 2016 Anzac Test, losing 0-16. Coached by Stephen Kearney the team was Jordan Kahu, Jason Nightingale, Tohu Harris, Gerard Beale, Dallin Watene-Zelezniak, Kodi Nikorima, Shaun Johnson, Jesse Bromwich (c), Lewis Brown, Adam Blair, Kevin Proctor, Manu Ma'u, Jason Taumalolo. Bench: Greg Eastwood, Martin Taupau, Sam Moa and Kenny Bromwich. Peta Hiku, Shaun Kenny-Dowall and Brad Takairangi were originally selected to play but withdrew due to injury. Alex Glenn and Danny Levi were a part of the Kiwis squad but did not play in the match.

Kearney stepped down as coach on 12 September, to become the New Zealand Warriors head coach. He was replaced by David Kidwell, who took on the position full-time.

The Kiwis will compete an end of season test match against Australia in Perth, and the 2016 Four Nations in Great Britain.

The Junior Kiwis played in a trans-Tasman match on 7 May, losing 20-34. Coached by Kelvin Wright, the squad was Brad Abbey (Canterbury Bulldogs), Greg Lelesiuao (Gold Coast Titans), Patrick Herbert (St George-Illawarra Dragons), Reimis Smith (Canterbury Bulldogs), Ken Tofilau (Newcastle Knights), Jamayne Isaako (Brisbane Broncos), Ata Hingano (New Zealand Warriors), Poasa Faamausili (Sydney Roosters), Brandon Smith (North Queensland Cowboys), Cowan Epere (Penrith Panthers), Marata Niukore (New Zealand Warriors), Esan Marsters (Wests Tigers) and Tom Amone (Parramatta Eels). Bench: Siosifa Talakai (South Sydney Rabbitohs), Nathaniel Roache (New Zealand Warriors), Isaiah Papalii (New Zealand Warriors) and Kurt Bernard (Penrith Panthers).

The New Zealand Residents side played a New Zealand Māori team on 15 October.

The New Zealand Rugby League named Jesse Bromwich as the Kiwis Player of the year while Jordan Rapana was the Kiwi Rookie of the year and James Fisher-Harris was the junior player of the year. Other award winners were: Shane Price (volunteer), He Tauaa (club), Andrew Auimatagi (domestic coach), Chris McMillan (match official), Jordan Riki (under 16s), Chanel Harris-Tavita (under 18s), Daniel Palavi (domestic player) and Sarina Fiso (women's player).

== National competitions ==
=== Rugby League Cup ===
Auckland are the holders of the Rugby League Cup but have not defended the trophy since 2012.

=== National Competition ===
2016 will be the seventh year of the National Competition. The competition was reformatted for this season, with Akarana, Counties Manukau, Canterbury and Wellington competing in a National Championship. The other zones will revert to district teams with these teams competing in four regional championships. The four winners will then compete in a National Premiership competition, and the winner will play a promotion-relegation match against the last placed National Championship side.

==== National Championship ====
The Akarana Falcons won the grand final, after finishing second following the round-robin.

===== Season standings =====
Team	Pld	W	D	L	B	PF	PA	Pts
Counties Manukau Stingrays	3	2	0	1	142	64	+78	4
Akarana Falcons	3	2	0	1	116	88	+28	4
Canterbury Bulls	3	2	0	1	94	78	+16	4
Wellington Orcas	3	0	0	3	52	176	-124	0

===== Final =====
Home	Score	Away	Match Information
Home	Score	Away	Date	Venue
Counties Manukau Stingrays	12-32	Akarana Falcons	1 October	Mount Smart Stadium, Auckland

==== National Premiership ====
The match between the Southland Rams and Canterbury Development sides, won by Southland, was for the Eddie Hei Hei Memorial Trophy.

Team	Pld	W	D	L	B	PF	PA	Pts
Waikato	3	3	0	0	134	14	+120	6
Southland Rams	3	2	0	1	54	76	-22	4
Canterbury Development	3	1	0	2	66	62	+4	2
Taranaki Sharks	3	0	0	3	28	130	-102	0

===== Promotion/Relegation =====
Waikato earned promotion to the 2017 National Competition, while Wellington will have to win their regional competition to enter the 2017 National Premiership.

Home	Score	Away	Match Information
Home	Score	Away	Date	Venue
Wellington Orcas	14-38	Waikato	1 October	Mount Smart Stadium, Auckland

==== Regional competitions ====
The Southern region series, which started in August, involved Southland, Otago, West Coast and Tasman. The competition was won by Southland, who were undefeated.

Waikato defeated Northland and the Bay of Plenty while Taranaki defeated the Manawatu Mustangs in a two-match series.

Canterbury Development defeated the Auckland Vulcans development side in a one-off match.

==== National secondary schools tournament ====
The national secondary schools tournament was won by the Southern Cross Campus, who defeated Kelston Boys' High School 16-12 in the final. Onehunga High School won the development division.

==== National youth tournament ====
The Counties Manukau Stingray defeated the Akarana Falcons 18-16 in the under-15 youth final, while Akarana defeated the South Island Scorpions 44-6 to win the under-17 competition.

== Australian competitions ==
The New Zealand Warriors played in their 22nd first grade season in the Australian competition, finishing 10th in the National Rugby League.

The Warriors also fielded teams in the Intrust Super Premiership NSW and Holden Cup. The Intrust Super Premiership NSW team finished 5th, and then defeated the Penrith Panthers 21-14 in an elimination final before losing to the Newtown Jets 18-22 in a semi-final. The Junior Warriors Holden Cup team finished the season in 14th position.

For the third consecutive year, Auckland hosted the 2016 NRL Auckland Nines.

== Club competitions ==
=== Auckland ===
The Papakura Sea Eagles won the Fox Memorial, defeating the Pt Chev Pirates 12-8 in the grand final. The Sea Eagles had also won the Rukutai Shield as the minor premiers, and held the Roope Rooster challenge cup at the end of the season. Mt Albert won the Kiwi Shield.

The Te Atatu Roosters won the Sharman Cup, defeating the Bay Roskill Vikings 31-22 to earn promotion for 2017. The Roosters had also won the Phelan Shield as minor premiers.

Papakura also won the ARL Coastal Classic Nines, defeating the Howick Hornets 20-14 in the final. The Ngaruawahia Panthers won the plate, defeating the Manurewa Marlins 8-0. It was the first time a side from the Waikato had competed.

Zacharia Tippins from the Glenora Bears was named the Fox Memorial Player of the Year, Nukurua Ngere from Papatoetoe was the Sharman Cup Player of the Year, Jonathan Carl from Pt Chevalier won the Lance Painter Rose Bowl for top goal kicker in the Fox Memorial, Saula Solomona from Pt Chevalier won the Masters Rugby League Cup for top try-scorer in the Fox Memorial and Mt Albert's Zae Wallace was the rookie of the year. Richie Blackmore was named coach of the year.

The team of the year was; Fullback: James Dowie (Papakura), Winger: Saula Solomona (Pt Chevalier), Centre: Semisi Tyrell (Mangere East), Standoff: Drew Radich (Otahuhu), Halfback: Raymond Talimalie (Mangere East), Prop: Tony Tuia (Howick), Hooker: Zacharia Tippins (Glenora), Second-row: Dion Snell (Mt Albert) and Lock: Trent Bishop (Howick).

- The Ellerslie Eagles included Toshio Laiseni and Darin Kingi.
- The Papakura Sea Eagles were coached by Richie Blackmore and included Roman Hifo and Kim Uasi.
- The Point Chevalier Pirates included Malo Solomona and Tevita Latu.
- The Mount Albert Lions were coached by Willie Swann.
- The Manurewa Marlins included Neccrom Areaiiti.
- The Ellerslie Eagles included Toshio Laiseni.

=== Wellington ===
Whiti Te Ra defeated Te Aroha 26-24 in the Wellington Rugby League grand final. It was Whiti Te Ra's first title and they went through the season undefeated, the first team to do so since the Randwick Kingfishers in 1944.

=== Canterbury ===
The Linwood Keas won the Canterbury Rugby League's Pat Smith Memorial Trophy by defeating the Hornby Panthers 29-10 at AMI Stadium. Corey Lawrie captained the Hornby side. Linwood's Erwin Sauni was awarded the Mel Cooke Memorial Trophy as the man of the match.

=== Northland ===
The Takahiwai Warriors won the Whangarei City & Districts rugby league title by defeating the Otangarei Knights 18-16 at Toll Stadium, Whangārei.

The Kaikohe Lions won the inaugural Taitokerau rugby league Premiership title by defeating the Pawerenga Broncos 10-6 at Rugby Park, Kaikohe.

The Moerewa Tigers won the inaugural Taitokerau rugby league Championship title by defeating the Muriwhenua Falcons 38-10 at Rugby Park, Kaikohe.

=== Other leagues ===
The Southland Rugby League and Otago Rugby League ran a joint eight team competition after both leagues were reduced to four teams. He Tauaa defeated the Cowboys 20-18 in the Southland club rugby league final at Les George Oval to win their fourth successive title.
