= 2015 New Zealand rugby league season =

Seasons
- 2014 2016

The 2015 New Zealand rugby league season was the 108th season of rugby league that had been played in New Zealand. The main feature of the year was the National Competition, which was won by the Counties Manukau Stingrays.

The New Zealand national team competed in the 2015 Anzac Test and then toured England in November.

== International competitions ==
The Kiwis toured Great Britain, playing in three test matches against England. New Zealand defeated the Leeds Rhinos 34-16, before losing the first test match to England 12-26. They won the second test 9-2 before losing the third test 14-20.

The touring squad was coached by Stephen Kearney and included Jordan Kahu, Kodi Nikorima, Adam Blair (c), Alex Glenn (Brisbane), Curtis Rona (Canterbury Bulldogs), Gerard Beale (Cronulla-Sutherland), Roger Tuivasa-Sheck, Sam Moa, Shaun Kenny-Dowall, Sio Siua Taukeiaho, Isaac Liu (Sydney Roosters), Peta Hiku (Manly-Warringah), Jesse Bromwich, Tohu Harris, Kevin Proctor (Melbourne), Tuimoala Lolohea, Ben Matulino (New Zealand Warriors), Dean Whare, Lewis Brown (Penrith), Jason Nightingale (St. George Illawarra), Martin Taupau and Manaia Cherrington (Wests Tigers).

New Zealand also competed in the 2015 Anzac Test which was played on 3 May, after being postponed on 1 May due to heavy rain at Suncorp Stadium. The Kiwis won 26-12, after leading 26-6 at halftime. The win was their first ANZAC test match victory for 17 years and the first time New Zealand had won three consecutive test matches over Australia since 1953. As man of the match, Manu Vatuvei was awarded the Charles Savory medal.

The Kiwis team for the ANZAC test on 3 May was Roger Tuivasa-Sheck (Sydney Roosters), Jason Nightingale (St. George-Illawarra), Peta Hiku (Manly Sea Eagles), Shaun Kenny-Dowall (Sydney Roosters), Manu Vatuvei (NZ Warriors), Kieran Foran (Manly Sea Eagles), Shaun Johnson (NZ Warriors), Jesse Bromwich (Melbourne Storm), Issac Luke (South Sydney Rabbitohs), Ben Matulino (NZ Warriors), Kevin Proctor (Melbourne Storm), Tohu Harris (Melbourne Storm) and Simon Mannering (c - NZ Warriors). Bench: Thomas Leuluai (NZ Warriors), Sam Moa (Sydney Roosters), Martin Taupau (Wests Tigers) and Greg Eastwood (Canterbury Bulldogs). Lewis Brown (Penrith Panthers) was the 18th man and did not play while Dallin Watene-Zelezniak (Penrith Panthers) was originally named in the squad but was suspended by the NRL judiciary and replaced by Nightingale.

The ANZAC test victory saw New Zealand become the number one ranked team in the RLIF World Rankings for the first time.

The Kiwiferns lost 14-22 to Australia in a curtain raiser to the ANZAC test. Coached by Alan Jackson, the full NZ Kiwi Ferns squad for the Anzac test curtainraiser is Tasha Davie, Shontelle Dudley, Maitua Feterika, Teuila Fotu-Moala, Georgia Hale, Annabelle Hohepa, Nora Maaka, Kelly Maipi, Laura Mariu, Krystal Murray, Hilda Peters, Kahurangi Peters, Rona Peters, Krystal Rota, Kristina Sue, Atawhai Tupaea, Janna Vaughan and Sharnita Woodman.

The NZ Defence Force lost 24-30 to the Australian Combined Armed Services on 2 May.

On 2 May the Junior Kiwis lost to the Junior Kangaroos 20-22. Coached by Kelvin Wright, the Junior Kiwis squad was Bunty Afoa, Marata Niukore, Toafofoa Sipley, Jazz Tevaga (NZ Warriors), Nelson Asofa-Solomona, Tony Tumusa (Melbourne Storm), Zach Dockar-Clay (Parramatta Eels), James Fisher-Harris, Sione Katoa (Penrith Panthers), Watson Heleta, Lamar Liolevave, Te Maire Martin (Wests Tigers), Jamayne Isaako (Cronulla Sharks), Daniel Levi (Newcastle Knights), Joseph Manu, Taane Milne (Sydney Roosters), Renouf To'omaga (Canterbury Bulldogs) and Braden Uele (North Queensland Cowboys).

A New Zealand Under-18s team toured Australia in September, playing two matches against the Australian Schoolboys. They lost the first 24-70 and the second 6-30. The matches were nearly cancelled due to funding issues. The squad was Tarquinn Alatipi (Wellington), Whitiroa Davis (Akarana), Keanu Dawson (Upper Central), Josh Farrant (Akarana), Rory Ferguson (Southern), Jackson Ferris (Mid Central), Bostyn Hakaraia (Akarana), Morgan Harper (Upper Central), Phoenix Hunt (Counties Manukau), Kenese Kenese (Counties Manukau), Dean Kouka-Smith (Akarana), Rory Marshall-Barton (Counties Manukau), Tyrone Nathan (Counties Manukau), Fabian Paletua-Kiri (Mid-Central), Isaiah Papalii (Akarana), David Phillips (Counties Manukau), Chris Sio (Akarana), Lewis Soosemea (Counties Manukau) and Auzzie Tuwhangai (Akarana).

A New Zealand Maori Residents team defeated Auckland 36-32 on 30 May 2015 at Puketawhero Park in Rotorua. The Maori team was coached by Ricky Henry and included Kouma Samson, Malo Solomona and Jeremiah Pai while Auckland was coached by Richie Blackmore and included Willie Peace, Eliakim Uasi, Roman Hifo, Tulson Caird and Herman Retzlaff.

== National competitions ==
=== Rugby League Cup ===
Auckland were the holders of the Rugby League Cup but did not contest the trophy. They had not defended the trophy since 2012.

=== National Competition ===
2015 was the sixth year of the National Competition. The championship was won by the Counties Manukau Stingrays.

A merit team was announced at the conclusion of the tournament and consisted of George Edwards (Counties Manukau Stingrays), Joseph Oti (Wellington Orcas), Matt Sauni (Canterbury Bulls), Simione Ma’amaloa (Counties Manukau Stingrays), Andrew Tusiane (Counties Manukau Stingrays), Tevin Arona (Canterbury Bulls), Ray Talimalie (Counties Manukau Stingrays), Saipani Aiolupo (Counties Manukau Stingrays), Kruz Tupo (Counties Manukau Stingrays), Chris Bamford (Canterbury Bulls), Sione Feao (Counties Manukau Stingrays), James Baxendale (Canterbury Bulls) and Nick Read (Wai-Coa-Bay Stallions). Bench: Uila Aiolupo (Counties Manukau Stingrays), Eli George (Northern Swords), Erwin Sauni (Canterbury Bulls) and Jeremy Siulepa (Wai-Coa-Bay Stallions).

==== Season standings ====
Team	Pld	W	D	L	B	PF	PA	Pts
Counties Manukau Stingrays	6	5	0	1	1	302	100	12
Canterbury Bulls	6	5	0	1	1	246	116	12
Waicoa Bay Stallions	6	5	0	1	1	198	110	12
Akarana Falcons	6	2	1	3	1	188	168	7
Wellington Orcas	6	2	1	3	1	166	213	7
Central Vipers	6	1	0	5	1	134	332	4
Northern Swords	6	0	0	6	1	88	281	2

==== Final ====
Home	Score	Away	Match Information
Home	Score	Away	Date	Venue
Counties Manukau Stingrays	41 - 10	Canterbury Bulls	17 October	Mt Smart Stadium, Auckland

=== Regional competitions ===
The Manawatu Mustangs defeated the Taranaki Sharks 38-34, and Hawkes Bay 56-22 to win the central region tri-series.

The Canterbury "A" team won the South Island provincial rugby league competition.

== Australian competitions ==
The New Zealand Warriors played their 21st first grade season in the Australian competition, playing in the National Rugby League and finishing 13th.

The Warriors also fielded teams in the New South Wales Cup and Holden Cup (Under-20s), finishing fourth and seventh respectively. Both teams made the finals, the NSW Cup team lost two finals matches, while the Holden Cup (Under-20s) team won two matches, before being eliminated by the Penrith Panthers in the preliminary final.

In February, Auckland hosted the launch of the 2015 NRL season, as well as the 2015 NRL Auckland Nines. A NRL match between the Melbourne Storm and St. George Illawarra Dragons was also played in Napier at McLean Park on 25 July.

== Club competitions ==
=== Auckland ===
The Point Chevalier Pirates won the Fox Memorial, defeating the Mount Albert Lions 22-10 in the final.

The Papakura Sea Eagles won the pre-season rugby league nines competition, which was held in Whitianga.

- Manurewa Marlins included Neccrom Areaiiti.
- Papakura Sea Eagles included Eliakimi Uasi, Upu Poching and Roman Hifo.
- The Point Chevalier Pirates included Tevita Latu, Paki Afu and Jeremiah Pai.
- The Northcote Tigers were coached by Mark Elia and included Paul Rauhihi and Eko Malu.
- The Glenora Bears were coached by Boycie Nelson.
- The Mount Albert Lions were coached by Steve Buckingham and included Patrick Ah Van.

=== Wellington ===
The Te Aroha Eels beat the Wainuiomata Lions to win the Wellington Rugby League competition.

=== Canterbury ===
The Papanui Tigers defeated the Linwood Keas 20-14 after extra time at AMI Stadium to win the Canterbury Rugby League competition for the first time in 17 years.

=== Northland ===
The Hikurangi Stags won the Northland Rugby League Premiership title, defeating the Takahiwai Warriors 20-16 at Toll Stadium, Whangārei.

The Otaua Valleys won the inaugural Northland Rugby League Championship title, defeating the Pawerenga Broncos 28-12 at Toll Stadium, Whangārei.

=== Other leagues ===
The Hamilton City Tigers defeated Taniwharau 33-12 to win the Waikato Rugby League title.

The Pacific Sharks, from Tokoroa, defeated the Taupo Phoenix 34-30 in the final of the Bay of Plenty-Coastline Rugby League competition.

The Marist Dragons won the Taranaki Rugby League season, defeating the Coastal Cobras 28-10 at Pukekura Park in the grand final.

The Tahunanui Tigers won the Tasman Rugby League title, defeating the Victory Phoenix 30-22.

The South Pacific Raiders defeated the East Coast Eagles 26-24 at Forsyth Barr Stadium to win the Otago Rugby League title.

The West Coast Rugby League celebrated 100 years during the season.
