= 2017 New Zealand rugby league season =

Seasons
- 2016 2018

The 2017 New Zealand rugby league season was the 110th season of rugby league that had been played in New Zealand. The main feature of the year was the National Competition, run by the New Zealand Rugby League. The New Zealand national rugby league team also competed at the 2017 Rugby League World Cup.

== International competitions ==
New Zealand were in Group B of the World Cup. They defeated Samoa 38-8 and will play Scotland and Tonga. Coached by David Kidwell, Adam Blair captains the side which includes Nelson Asofa-Solomona, Gerard Beale, Kenny Bromwich, Addin Fonua-Blake, Peta Hiku, Shaun Johnson, Thomas Leuluai, Danny Levi, Isaac Liu, Simon Mannering, Te Maire Martin, Jason Nightingale, Kodi Nikorima, Russell Packer, Jordan Rapana, Brad Takairangi, Joseph Tapine, Martin Taupau, Elijah Taylor, Roger Tuivasa-Sheck, Jared Waerea-Hargreaves, Dallin Watene-Zelezniak and Dean Whare.

New Zealand lost the 2017 Anzac Test 12–30. Coached by David Kidwell the team was Roger Tuivasa-Sheck, Dallin Watene-Zelezniak, Jordan Kahu, Dean Whare, Jordan Rapana, Kieran Foran, Shaun Johnson, Jesse Bromwich (c), Issac Luke, Russell Packer, Kevin Proctor, Simon Mannering, Jason Taumalolo. Bench: Adam Blair, Martin Taupau, Kenny Bromwich and Kodi Nikorima. Elijah Taylor, David Fusitu'a and Brandon Smith were a part of the Kiwis squad but did not play in the match. Following the match Jesse Bromwich and Kevin Proctor were both caught with cocaine at a night club. They were subsequently fined by their clubs and suspended from the World Cup.

The Kiwi Ferns lost 4–16 to the Australian Jillaroos in the Anzac Test. Coached by Tony Benson, the team was Sarina Fiso (c), Langi Veainu, Corrina Whiley, Va'anessa Molia-Fraser, Atawhai Tupaea, Georgia Hale, Alex Cook, Lilieta Maumau, Krystal Rota, Bunty Kuruwaka-Crowe, Crystal Tamarua, Teuila Fotu-Moala and Laura Mariu. Bench: Annetta Nuuausala, Hilda Peters, Ngatokotoru Arakua and Nora Maaka. For the 2017 Women's Rugby League World Cup, The Kiwi Ferns selectors considered Australian-based players for the first time. Jason Stanton assists Benson at the tournament. The squad is Racquel Anderson, Ngatokotoru Arakua, Sharlene Atai, Maitua Feterika, Teuila Fotu Moala, Louisa Gago, Georgia Hale (vc), Honey Hireme, Amber Kani, Bunty Kuruwaka-Crowe, Laura Mariu (c), Lilieta Maumau, Nita Maynard, Raecene McGregor, Krystal Murray, Kimiora Nati, Apii Nicholls-Pualau, Annetta-Claudia Nu'uausala, Hilda Peters, Kahurangi Peters, Krystal Rota, Aieshaleigh Smalley, Atawhai Tupaea and Shontelle Woodman. New Zealand will play Canada, Papua New Guinea and the Cook Islands.

The Junior Kiwis were coached by Nathan Cayless and included Patrick Herbert, Gregory Leleisiuao, Reimis Smith, Siosifa Talakai, Steven Marsters, Chanel Harris-Tavita, Erin Clark, Emry Pere, Jarome Luai (c), Fabien Paletua-Kiri, Briton Nikora, Dane Aukafolau, Isaiah Papalii. Interchange: Manase Fainu, Moeaki Fotuaika, Kaleb Fuimaono and Sitili Tupouniua.

== National competitions ==
=== Rugby League Cup ===
Auckland are the holders of the Rugby League Cup but have not defended the trophy since 2012.

=== National Competition ===
2017 was the eighth year of the National Competition.

==== National Championship ====
===== Season standings =====
Team
Akarana Falcons
Waikato
Canterbury Bulls
Counties Manukau Stingrays

===== Final =====
Home	Score	Away	Match Information
Home	Score	Away	Date	Venue
Akarana Falcons	30-4	Waikato	7 October	Mount Smart Stadium, Auckland

==== National Premiership ====
Team
Bay of Plenty Lakers
Otago Whalers
Wellington Orcas

===== Promotion/Relegation =====
Home	Score	Away	Match Information
Home	Score	Away	Date	Venue
Counties Manukau Stingrays	64-4	Bay of Plenty Lakers	7 October	Mount Smart Stadium, Auckland

==== Regional competitions ====
The Southern regional series involved the Southland Rams, the Otago Whalers, the Tasman Titans, the West Coast Chargers and a new district, the Aoraki Eels.

== Australian competitions ==
The New Zealand Warriors played in their 23rd first grade season in the Australian competition.

The Warriors also fielded teams in the Intrust Super Premiership NSW and the Holden Cup.

For the fourth consecutive year, Auckland hosted the NRL Auckland Nines.

== Club competitions ==
=== Auckland ===
The Glenora Bears won the Fox Memorial, defeating the Point Chevalier Pirates 26–0 to win the Auckland Rugby League title. Glenora also won the Roope Rooster Challenge Trophy.

The Otahuhu Leopards defeated the Bay Roskill Vikings 34–20 to win the Sharman Cup.

The ARL Coastal Classic Nines were held on the Hibiscus Coast, after two years in Whitianga. The Pt Chevalier Pirates defeated the Hibiscus Coast Raiders 16–12 in the final to win the tournament.

Tevita Latu and Kevin Locke played for Point Chevalier while Epalahame Lauaki played for Glenora.

=== Wellington ===
Whiti Te Ra defeated the Wainuiomata Lions 18–8 to win the Wellington Rugby League title.

=== Canterbury ===
The Linwood Keas won the Canterbury Rugby League title, defeating the Hornby Panthers 34–20.

=== Northland ===
Moerewa Tigers won the Whangarei City & Districts title, defeating the Takahiwai Warriors 44–24 at Toll Stadium, Whangārei.

Ngati Kahu Sharks won the Taitokerau rugby league title, defeating the Kaikohe Lions 46–12.

=== Waikato ===
Taniwharau won the Waikato Rugby League title, defeating the Hamilton City Tigers 16–14.
