= 2018 New Zealand rugby league season =

Seasons
- 2017 2019

The 2018 New Zealand rugby league season was the 111th season of rugby league played in New Zealand. The main feature of the year was the National Competition, run by the New Zealand Rugby League.

== International competitions ==
The New Zealand national rugby league team played an end of season test match against the Australian side, before they toured Great Britain and played a three match test series against the England team.

== National competitions ==
=== Rugby League Cup ===
Auckland were the holders of the Rugby League Cup but have not defended the trophy since 2012.

=== National Competition ===
2017 will be the ninth year of the National Competition. The same four teams as 2017 will contest the National Championship, after Counties Manukau won the 2017 promotion/relegation game.

==== National Championship ====
===== Season standings =====
Team
Akarana Falcons
Canterbury Bulls
Counties Manukau Stingrays
Waikato

== Australian competitions ==
The New Zealand Warriors will play in their 24th first grade season in the Australian competition.

The Warriors will also fielded teams in the Intrust Super Premiership NSW and its associated under-20s competition.

During the 2018 NRL season, Auckland's Mount Smart Stadium will host a double header on 7 April where the Warriors will play the North Queensland Cowboys and the Wests Tigers will play the Melbourne Storm. It will be the first NRL double-header to be staged outside Australia.
