= List of storms named Alfred =

The name Alfred has been used for three tropical cyclones in the Australian region.

- Cyclone Alfred (1986) – a Category 1 tropical cyclone that stayed at sea for most of its lifetime.
- Cyclone Alfred (2017) – a Category 2 tropical cyclone that formed in the Gulf of Carpentaria, briefly affecting land.
- Cyclone Alfred (2025) – a Category 4 tropical cyclone that caused severe damage to south-east Queensland and the north coast of New South Wales.

After the 2025 storm, the name Alfred was retired. The name Akio was chosen to replace it.
