= Jordan Rapana =

New Zealand, Maori, and Cook Islands international rugby league footballer

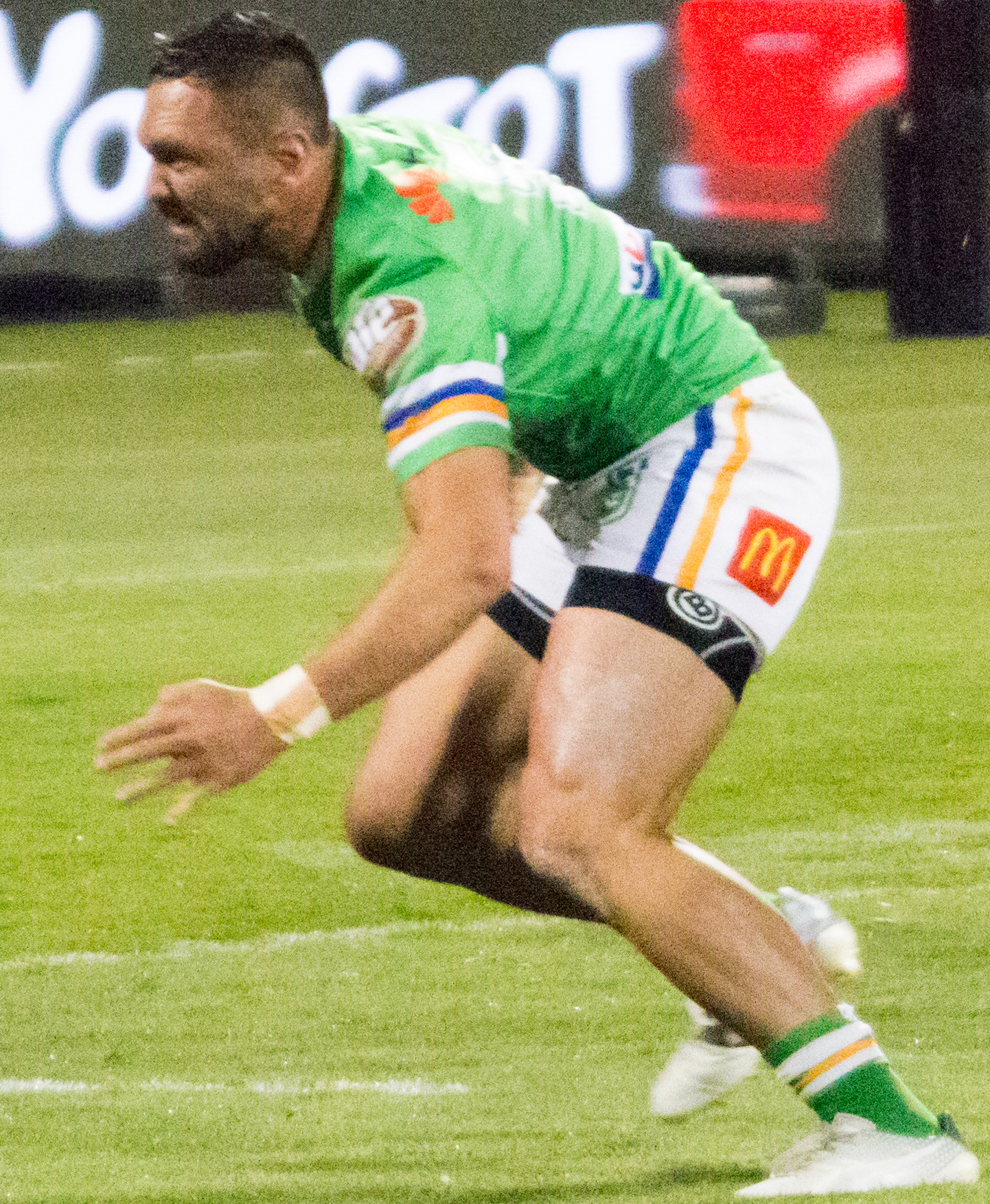

Personal information
- Born: 15 August 1989 (age 37) Wellington, New Zealand
- Height: 6 ft 2 in (1.87 m)
- Weight: 15 st 10 lb (100 kg)

Playing information

Rugby league
- Position: Wing, Fullback
Club
| Years | Team | Pld | T | G | FG | P |
|---|---|---|---|---|---|---|
| 2008 | Gold Coast Titans | 5 | 5 | 0 | 0 | 20 |
| 2014–19 | Canberra Raiders | 113 | 69 | 0 | 0 | 276 |
| 2020–24 | Canberra Raiders | 101 | 37 | 35 | 2 | 220 |
| 2025 | Hull F.C. | 23 | 3 | 0 | 0 | 12 |
| | Total | 242 | 114 | 35 | 2 | 528 |
Representative
| Years | Team | Pld | T | G | FG | P |
| 2008 | New Zealand Māori | 1 | 0 | 0 | 0 | 0 |
| 2013–15 | Cook Islands | 3 | 0 | 2 | 0 | 4 |
| 2016–22 | New Zealand | 16 | 11 | 19 | 0 | 82 |
| 2023 | Māori All Stars | 1 | 0 | 0 | 0 | 0 |

Rugby union
Club
| Years | Team | Pld | T | G | FG | P |
|---|---|---|---|---|---|---|
| 2012 | Western Force | | | 0 | 0 |
| 2019–20 | Wild Knights | 3 | 3 | 0 | 0 | 15 |
| | Total | 3 | 3 | 0 | 0 | 15 |
- Source: As of 27 August 2025
- Relatives: Tazmin Gray (sister)

Jordan Rapana (born 15 August 1989) is a former professional rugby league footballer who last played as a Fullback and/or winger for Hull F.C. in the Super League. He has played for the New Zealand Māori, New Zealand and the Cook Islands at international level.

He previously played for the Gold Coast Titans NRL club and the Western Force Super Rugby team.

== Background ==
Rapana was born in Wellington, New Zealand, and is of Māori, Cook Island and Italian descent. From the Ngāti Toa iwi (Māori tribe), he moved to the Gold Coast, Queensland, Australia as a 10-year-old.

He played his junior football for the Tugun Seahawks and attended Palm Beach Currumbin High School before being signed by the Gold Coast Titans.

== Playing career ==
=== 2008 ===
In 2008, Rapana played for the Gold Coast Titans' NYC team. In Round 18 of the 2008 NRL season, he made his NRL debut for the Gold Coast Titans against the Sydney Roosters. At the end of 2008, he was named on the interchange bench in the 2008 NYC Team of the Year.

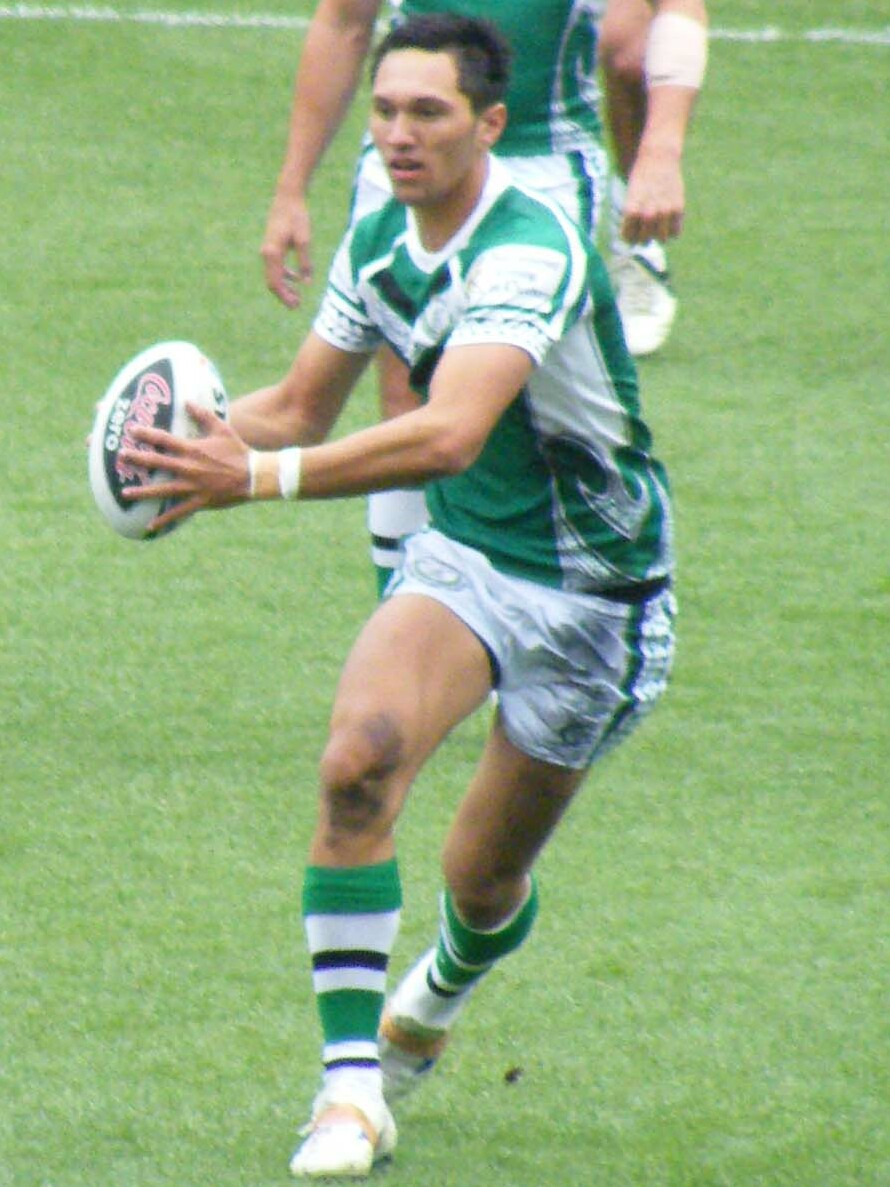
Rapana playing for the New Zealand Māori in 2008

He also played for the New Zealand Māori rugby league team.

=== 2009 ===
In 2009, Rapana left the NRL to serve a two-year Mormon mission in England and Wales. During his time in England he played for Supermarine RFC.

=== 2011 ===
In June, Rapana signed a contract with Super Rugby team, Western Force, starting in 2012. For the 2012 season, he played for the Palmyra Rugby Union Club.

=== 2013 ===
In 2013, Rapana moved to Canberra to play for the Queanbeyan Blues in the TTM Canberra Raiders Cup and also to train with the Brumbies in the hope of gaining a contract. On 24 June, he signed a two-year contract with the Canberra Raiders effective immediately.

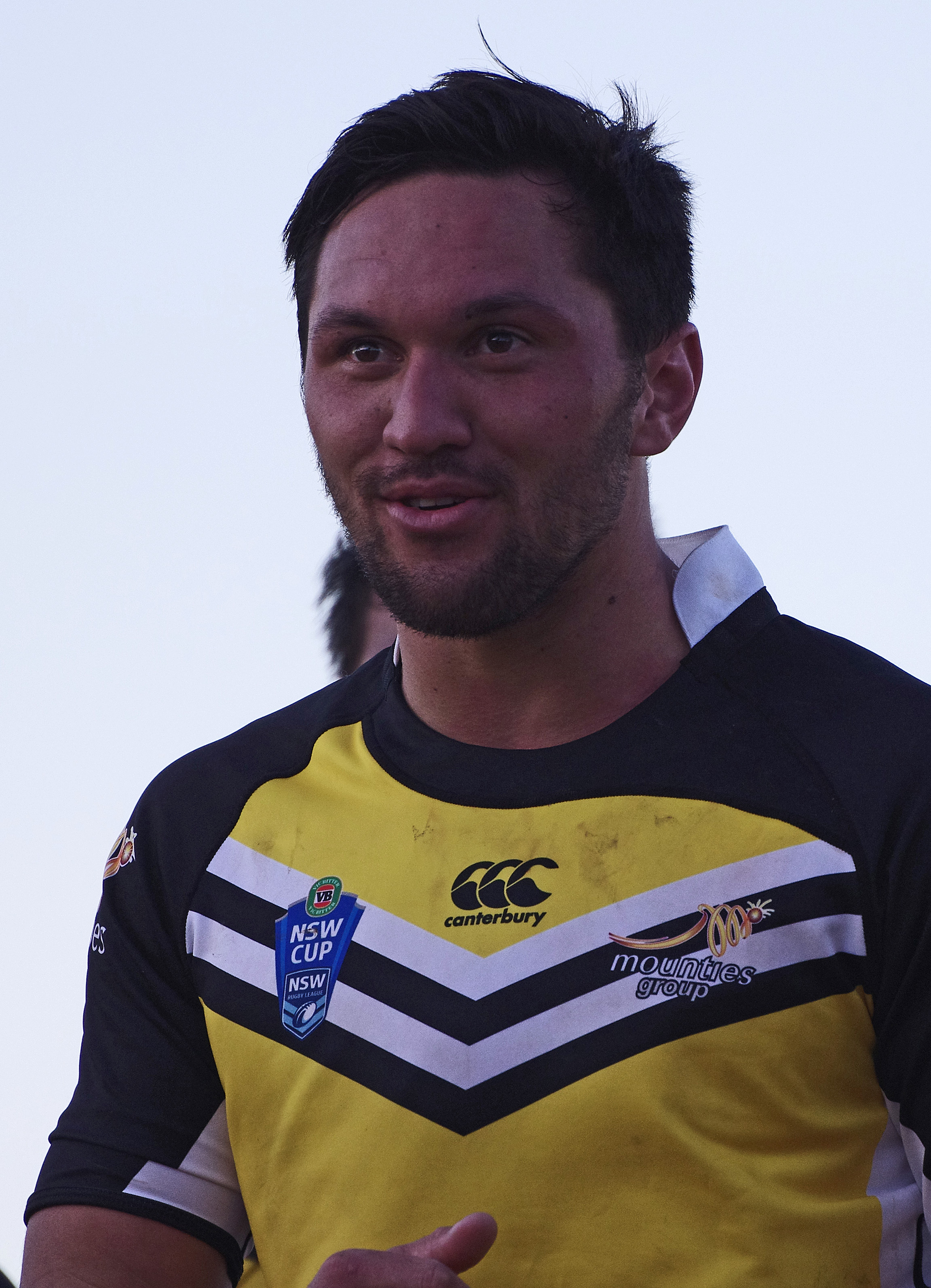
Rapana playing for the Mount Pritchard Mounties in 2013

At the end of 2013, he played for the Cook Islands in the 2013 Rugby League World Cup.

=== 2014 ===
On 7 August, Rapana re-signed with the Raiders on a one-year contract. In Round 22, he made his debut for them against the Parramatta Eels, his first NRL game since 2008.

=== 2015 ===
On 8 May, Rapana re-signed with Canberra on a two-year contract. On 17 October, he played for the Cook Islands in their Asia-Pacific Qualifier match against Tonga for the 2017 Rugby League World Cup.

=== 2016 ===
In Round 8 against the Wests Tigers, Rapana scored four tries in Canberra's 60–6 win. He finished the 2016 season with 23 tries, equal most with Suliasi Vunivalu, and breaking the Canberra club record During the season, Rapana and his centre partner Joseph Leilua became one of the most destructive duos of the year, scoring some fantastic tries and their strong friendship outside the footy field labelling them as "Leipana". On 4 October, he was rewarded for his big year with Canberra by being selected in the New Zealand Kiwis 24-man squad for the 2016 Four Nations. On 15 October 2016, he made his international debut for the Kiwis against Australia, playing on the wing in the 26–6 loss at Perth Oval. In his next match against England, Rapana scored two tries in the 17–16 win at Kirklees Stadium in Huddersfield.

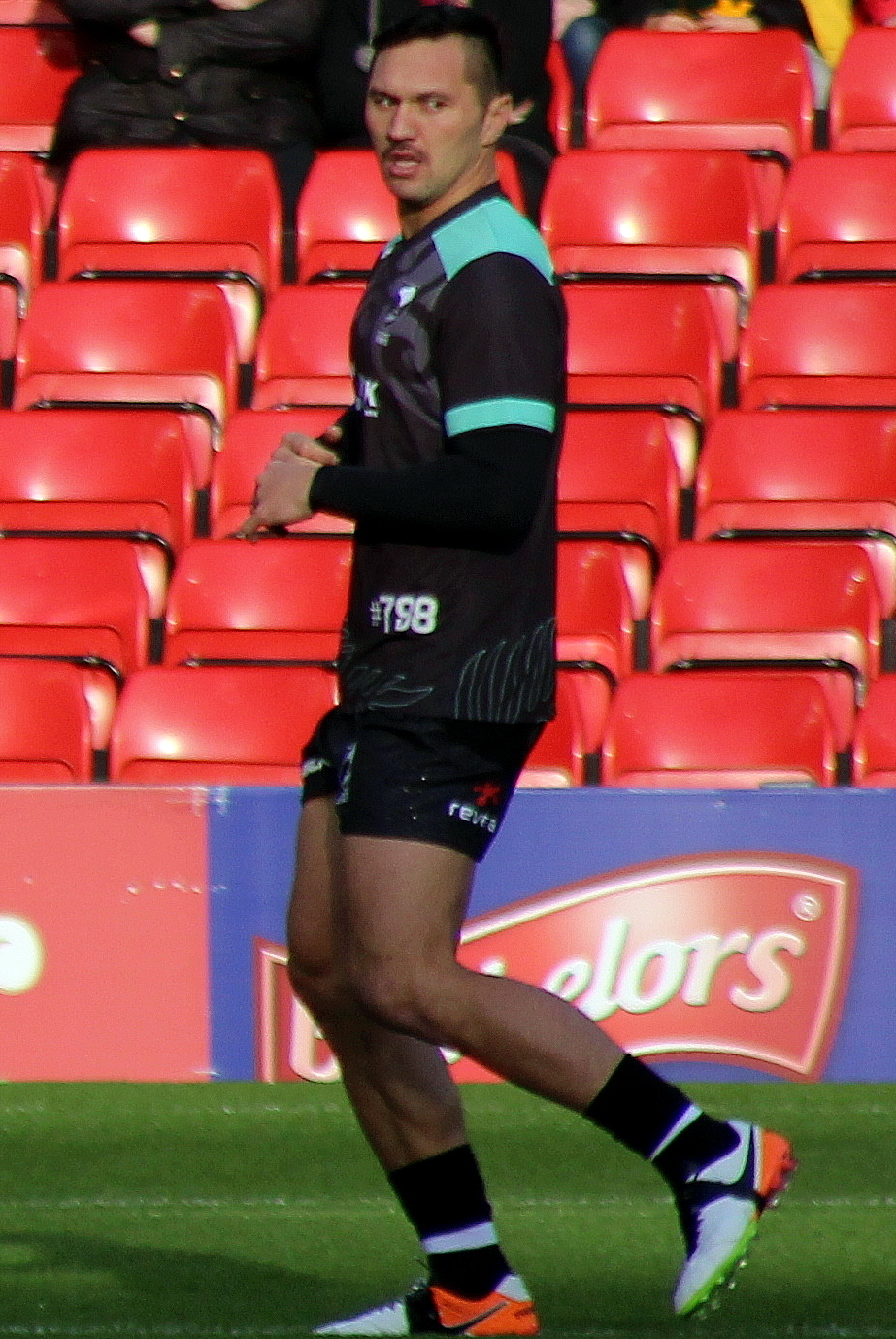
Rapana warming up for the Kiwis in 2016

Rapana played in four matches and scored three tries in the tournament including in the final match against Australia, playing on the wing in the 34–8 loss at Anfield.

Rapana was named the Kiwis rookie of the year by the New Zealand Rugby League.

=== 2017 ===
After Canberra's round 1 match against the North Queensland Cowboys, Rapana received a warning from the NRL after he put up both of his middle fingers, gesturing at the officials after teammate Elliot Whitehead was denied a try in Golden Point Extra Time; the Raiders lost 20-16 shortly afterwards at 1300SMILES Stadium.

On 10 March, he signed a two-year extension with Canberra, keeping him in the nation's capital until 2019.

In Round 8 against the Manly-Warringah Sea Eagles, Rapana scored one of the season's best tries by leaping high and somehow getting a hand to a Blake Austin grubber that looked destined to go too deep in the corner during Canberra's 20-18 golden point extra time loss at Canberra Stadium.

On 5 May, Rapana played on the wing for New Zealand in the ANZAC Test, a 30–12 loss. Rapana finished the season as the club's highest try-scorer with 21 tries in 23 matches. On 5 October, he was named in the New Zealand Kiwis 24-man squad for the 2017 Rugby League World Cup. Rapana played in 3 matches and scored 2 tries in the Kiwis shock disappointing campaign.

=== 2018 ===
Rapana played in 21 matches and scored 10 tries for the Raiders in 2018. On 1 October, he was selected in the Kiwis' 23-man squad for their tour of England and the test match against Australia.

In the second match in the Baskerville Shield against England, Rapana suffered a dislocated shoulder during the 20–14 loss at Anfield. The injury was expected to sideline him for at least six months. The Raiders sought a salary cap exemption of up to $350,000, possible where a player suffers a long-term injury while on rep duty.

=== 2019 ===
Rapana made a return for Canberra two months earlier than expected, slotting back into his wing spot in round 2 against the Melbourne Storm. In Round 4 against the North Queensland Cowboys, he played his 100th NRL career match and scored two tries in the 30–12 win at 1300SMILES Stadium.

Rapana made 21 appearances for Canberra as the club reached their first grand final in 25 years, playing on the wing as Canberra were defeated 14-8 by the Sydney Roosters at ANZ Stadium.

In October 2019, Rapana announced that he had signed a one-year deal to join Japanese rugby union team the Panasonic Wild Knights. On 30 October, the NRL announced that Rapana would not be allowed to return to Canberra during the 2020 season. However, that decision was overturned when he returned to the Raiders in May 2020 following the suspension of the Japanese rugby season due to COVID-19.

=== 2020 ===
Rapana played 19 games for Canberra in the 2020 NRL season and scored only two tries. He played in all three of Canberra's finals matches including the preliminary final loss to Melbourne.

=== 2021 ===
In round 1 of the 2021 NRL season, he scored two tries in a 30-12 victory over Wests Tigers. He also scored two tries in round 7 against North Queensland. In round 8 against South Sydney, he scored two tries and kicked two goals in a 34-20 loss.

Rapana played 22 games for Canberra in 2021 and scored 12 tries in total. Canberra would finish the season in 10th place and missed out on the finals.

On 27 September, Rapana was arrested by Queensland Police after failing a roadside breath test, recording a blood alcohol limit of 0.098. He was handed a $500 fine and suspended from driving for three months at Maroochydore Magistrates Court.

=== 2022 ===
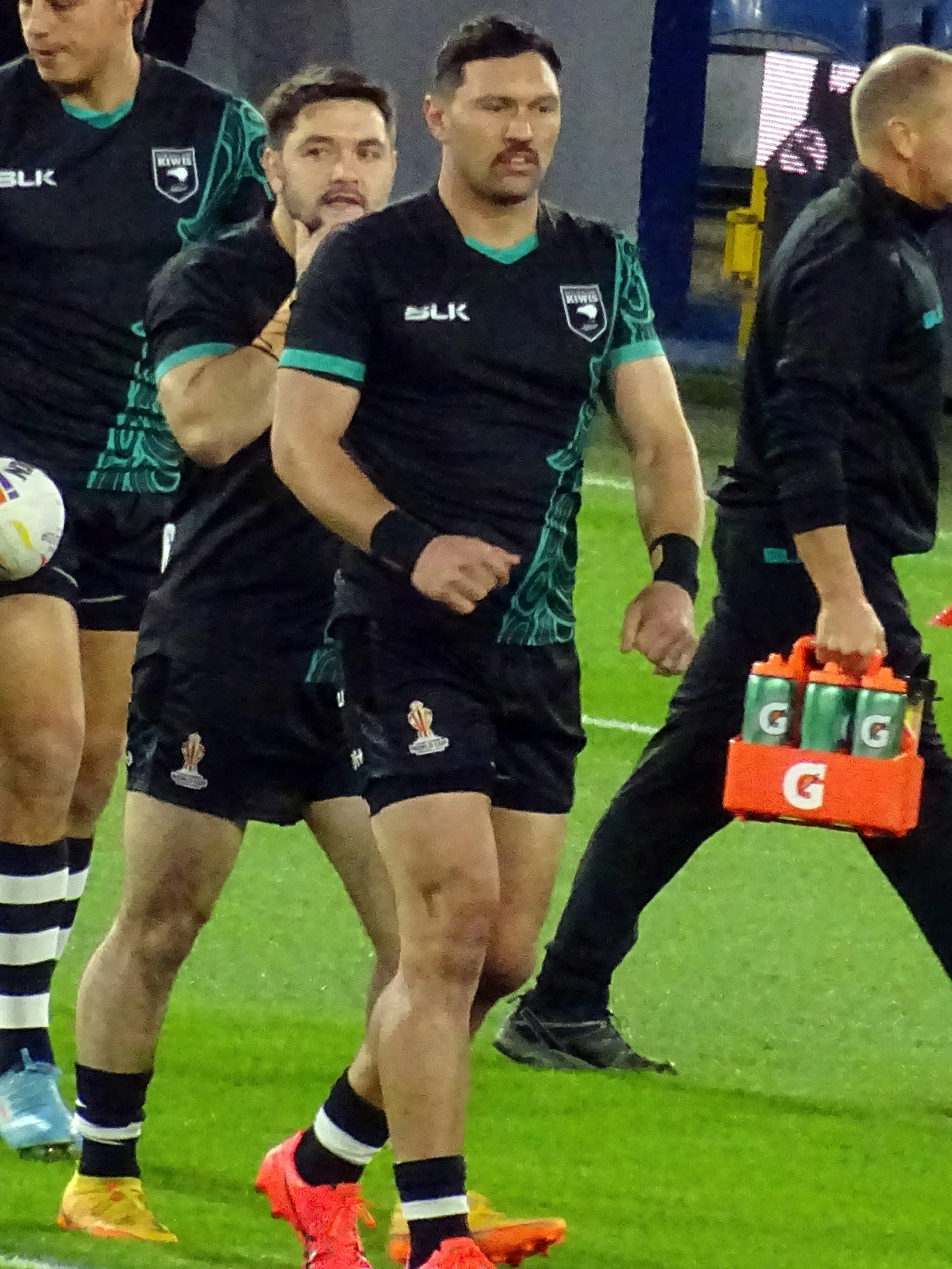
Rapana warming up for New Zealand in 2022

In round 18 of the 2022 NRL season, Rapana was sent to the sin bin for a dangerous high tackle during Canberra's 20-16 upset victory over Melbourne.

Rapana played a total of 21 games for Canberra in 2022 as the club finished 8th on the table and qualified for the finals. Rapana played in both finals matches as Canberra were eliminated in the second week by Parramatta.

In October Rapana was named in the New Zealand squad for the 2021 Rugby League World Cup.

=== 2023 ===
In round 1, Rapana was placed on report for a shoulder charge on North Queensland's Scott Drinkwater. He was later suspended for three games over the incident. In round 6, Rapana scored two tries for Canberra in an upset 20-14 victory over Brisbane. In the second half of the match, Rapana was taken from the field after his head collided with Martin Taupau's knee which caused Rapana to bleed heavily. In round 10, Rapana scored two tries for Canberra in a 34-30 victory over Canterbury. Rapana played a total of 21 matches for Canberra in the 2023 NRL season and scored eleven tries as the club finished 8th on the table and qualified for the finals.

=== 2024 ===
In round 13 of the 2024 NRL season, Rapana kicked two field goals including the winner in golden point extra-time as Canberra defeated the Dolphins 26-25. In round 21, Rapana scored two tries in Canberra's 32-12 victory over South Sydney. In round 26, Rapana suffered a fractured cheekbone in Canberra's upset victory over the Sydney Roosters. Rapana was later ruled out for the rest of the 2024 season. On 30 August it was announced that Rapana had signed a two-year deal with Super League side Hull F.C.

=== 2025 ===
In round 1 of the 2025 Super League season, Rapana made his club debut for Hull F.C. in their upset victory over Catalans Dragons. On 5 September, Rapana announced his retirement from the sport. Rapana played 21 games for Hull F.C. in the 2025 Super League season as the club finished 7th on the table.

== Statistics ==
| Year | Team | Games | Tries | Goals | FGs | Pts |
|---|---|---|---|---|---|---|
| 2008 | Gold Coast Titans | 5 | 5 | | | 20 |
| 2014 | Canberra Raiders | 2 | 1 | | | 4 |
| 2015 | Canberra Raiders | 19 | 7 | | | 28 |
| 2016 | Canberra Raiders | 27 | 23 | | | 92 |
| 2017 | Canberra Raiders | 23 | 21 | | | 84 |
| 2018 | Canberra Raiders | 21 | 10 | | | 40 |
| 2019 | Canberra Raiders | 21 | 7 | | | 28 |
| 2020 | Canberra Raiders | 19 | 2 | | | 8 |
| 2021 | Canberra Raiders | 22 | 12 | 9 | | 66 |
| 2022 | Canberra Raiders | 21 | 6 | 7 | | 38 |
| 2023 | Canberra Raiders | 19 | 10 | | | 40 |
| 2024 | Canberra Raiders | 18 | 6 | 19 | 2 | 64 |
| 2025 | Hull FC | 23 | 3 | | | 12 |
| | Totals | 242 | 114 | 35 | 2 | 528 |

*denotes season still competing
