= Kodi Nikorima =

New Zealand international rugby league footballer

Personal information
- Born: 3 April 1994 (age 32) Palmerston North, New Zealand
- Height: 174 cm (5 ft 9 in)
- Weight: 82 kg (12 st 13 lb)

Playing information
- Position: Five-eighth, Halfback, Hooker
Club
Years	Team	Pld	T	G	FG	P
2015–19	Brisbane Broncos	86	22	0	0	88
2019–22	New Zealand Warriors	59	11	60	1	165
2022	South Sydney	15	0	10	0	20
2023–26	Dolphins	84	19	1	0	78
2027–	St George Illawarra	0	0	0	0	0
	Total	244	52	71	1	351
Representative
Years	Team	Pld	T	G	FG	P
2015–	New Zealand	23	3	0	0	12
2020–25	Māori All Stars	4	2	4	0	16
- Source: As of 20 November 2026
- Education: Wavell State High School
- Relatives: Jayden Nikorima (brother)

Kodi Nikorima (born 3 April 1994) is a New Zealand professional rugby league footballer who plays as a five-eighth for the St George Illawarra Dragons in the National Rugby League (NRL) and as a hooker for New Zealand.

He previously played for the South Sydney Rabbitohs, the New Zealand Warriors, the Brisbane Broncos and the Dolphins in the NRL. He has captained Māori All Stars. He has also played as a hooker, halfback and fullback. His uncle (Kaine Manihera) is an ex NRL player for the broncos.

== Background ==
Nikorima was born in Palmerston North, New Zealand, and is of Māori and Irish descent. He moved to Brisbane, Queensland, Australia as a 12 year old.

Nikorima played his junior rugby league for the Aspley Devils and the Pine Rivers Bears (where he won a competition). He was educated at Wavell State High School, before being signed by the Brisbane Broncos. His younger brother Jayden Nikorima is also a professional rugby league footballer who plays as a five-eighth for the Bradford Bulls in the Super League.

== Playing career ==
=== Early career (2012-2014) ===
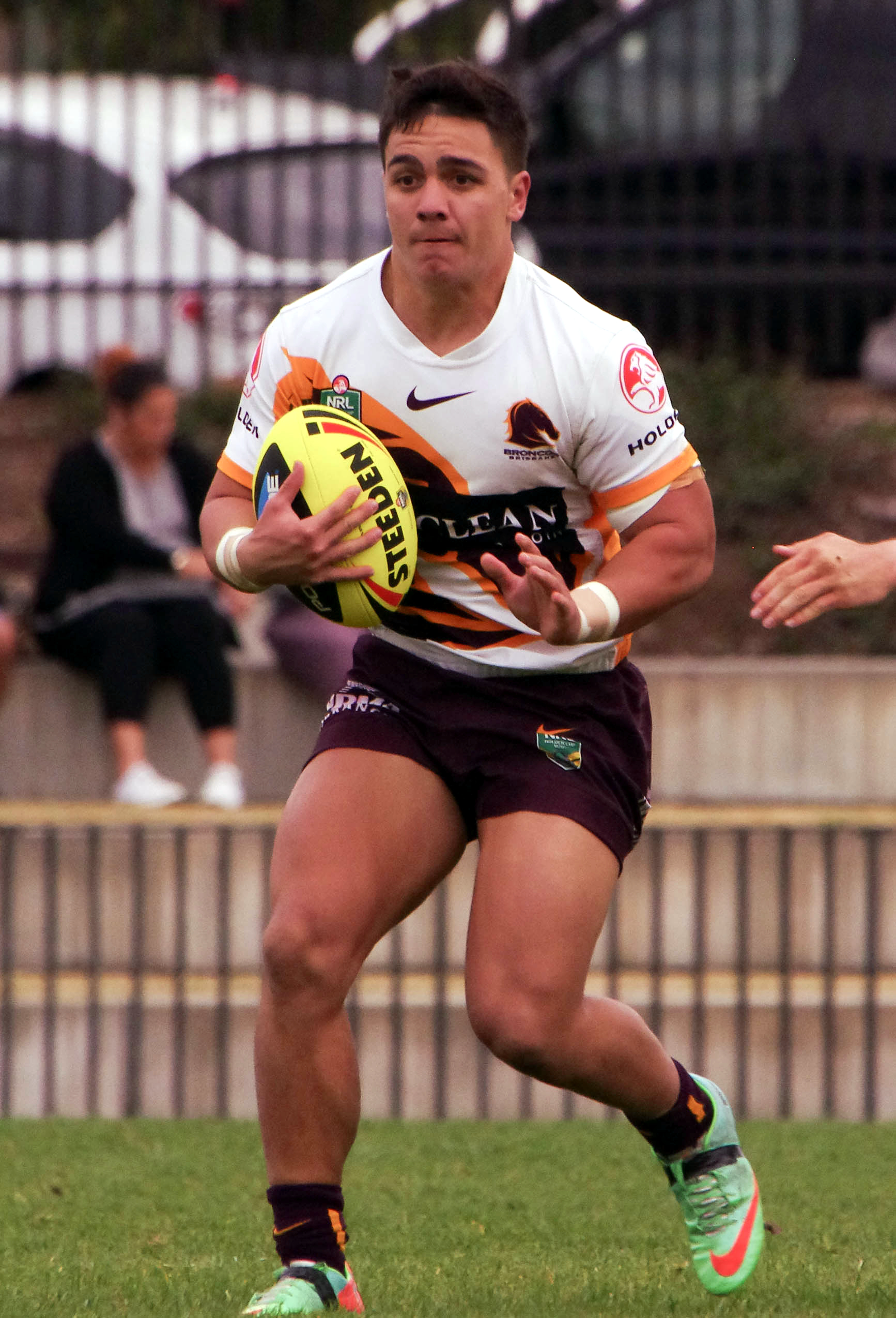
Nikorima playing for the Broncos NYC team in 2014

From 2012 to 2014, Nikorima played for the Brisbane Broncos' NYC team, playing 67 games, scoring 40 tries and kicking 9 goals for 178 points.

In February 2014, Nikorima was selected in the Broncos runners-up 2014 Auckland Nines squad. On 5 October 2014, Nikorima played for the Broncos in their 2014 NYC Grand Final against the New Zealand Warriors, playing at fullback and scoring a try in the 34-32 loss. On 18 October 2014, Nikorima played for the Junior Kiwis against the Junior Kangaroos, playing at fullback and scoring a try in the 15-14 win at Mt Smart Stadium.

=== Brisbane Broncos (2015-2019) ===
In January and February 2015, Nikorima played for the Broncos in the 2015 NRL Auckland Nines. In Round 2 of the 2015 NRL season, Nikorima made his NRL debut for the Broncos against the Cronulla-Sutherland Sharks, playing off the interchange bench in the Broncos' 10-2 win at Remondis Stadium. On 28 April, he was named as 18th-man for New Zealand against Australia in the 2015 Anzac Test. On 12 May, he re-signed with the Broncos on a one-year contract. In Round 20 against the Gold Coast Titans, he scored his first NRL career try in the Broncos' 34-0 win at Suncorp Stadium. On 4 October, he played off the interchange bench in the Broncos' 17-16 golden-point extra-time loss to the North Queensland Cowboys in the 2015 NRL Grand Final. He finished off his debut season in the NRL having played in 20 matches and scoring 1 try for the Broncos. On 9 October, he was selected in the 23-man New Zealand squad to tour England. He was one of four members of Brisbane's grand final team to be included in coach Stephen Kearney's squad for the three-test tour and one of six rookies to have received an international call-up by the Kiwis. On 2 November, he made his international debut against England, playing off the interchange bench in the Kiwis' 12-26 loss at KC Stadium. In the second test of the series, he was chosen to start at halfback over fellow rookie Tuimoala Lolohea, in the Kiwis' 9-2 win at London Olympic Stadium. On 14 November, in the third and final test match against England, Nikorima kept his starting halfback spot for the Kiwis in their 14-20 final loss at DW Stadium.

On 6 May 2016, Nikorima played for New Zealand against Australia in the 2016 Anzac Test, starting at five-eighth after being originally named on the interchange bench in the Kiwis' 16-0 loss at Hunter Stadium. In Round 17 against the Melbourne Storm, he dislocated his shoulder during the first half, where he played the rest of the match with the injury. After the match, he was ruled out for the rest of the year. On 7 September, he extended his contract with the Broncos for a further 2 years, until the end of the 2018 season. He finished the 2016 season having played in 16 matches and scoring 2 tries for the Broncos.

Nikorima spent the early rounds of the 2017 season playing in the QLD Cup for the Norths Devils before making his first appearance for the Broncos in Round 6 against the Sydney Roosters, playing off the interchange bench in the 32-8 win at Suncorp Stadium. When Broncos first choice halfback Ben Hunt was sidelined with a hamstring injury for 5 matches, Nikorima was selected to fill in at halfback and it come with great success resulting with the Broncos winning 5 matches in a row and him scoring 4 tries in that period of time. On 5 May 2017, Nikorima played for New Zealand in the 2017 ANZAC Test against Australia where he played off the interchange bench in the 30-12 loss at Canberra Stadium. On 17 July 2017, Nikorima extended his contract with the Broncos to the end of the 2020 season. Nikorima finished the 2017 NRL season with him playing in 19 matches and scoring 7 tries for the Broncos. On 5 October 2017, Nikorima was named in the 24-man New Zealand Kiwis squad for the 2017 Rugby League World Cup. In the Kiwis first pool match against Samoa, Nikorima scored his first international try for the Kiwis in the 38-8 win at Mt Smart Stadium. Nikorima finished the Kiwis disappointing campaign with him playing in 3 matches and scoring 1 try.

In 2018, Nikorima played as halfback in every game of the three match Kiwis tour of England in the northern autumn. He scored a try and was awarded man of the match in the Kiwis's 34-0 drubbing of England that was the final game.

=== New Zealand Warriors (2019-2022) ===
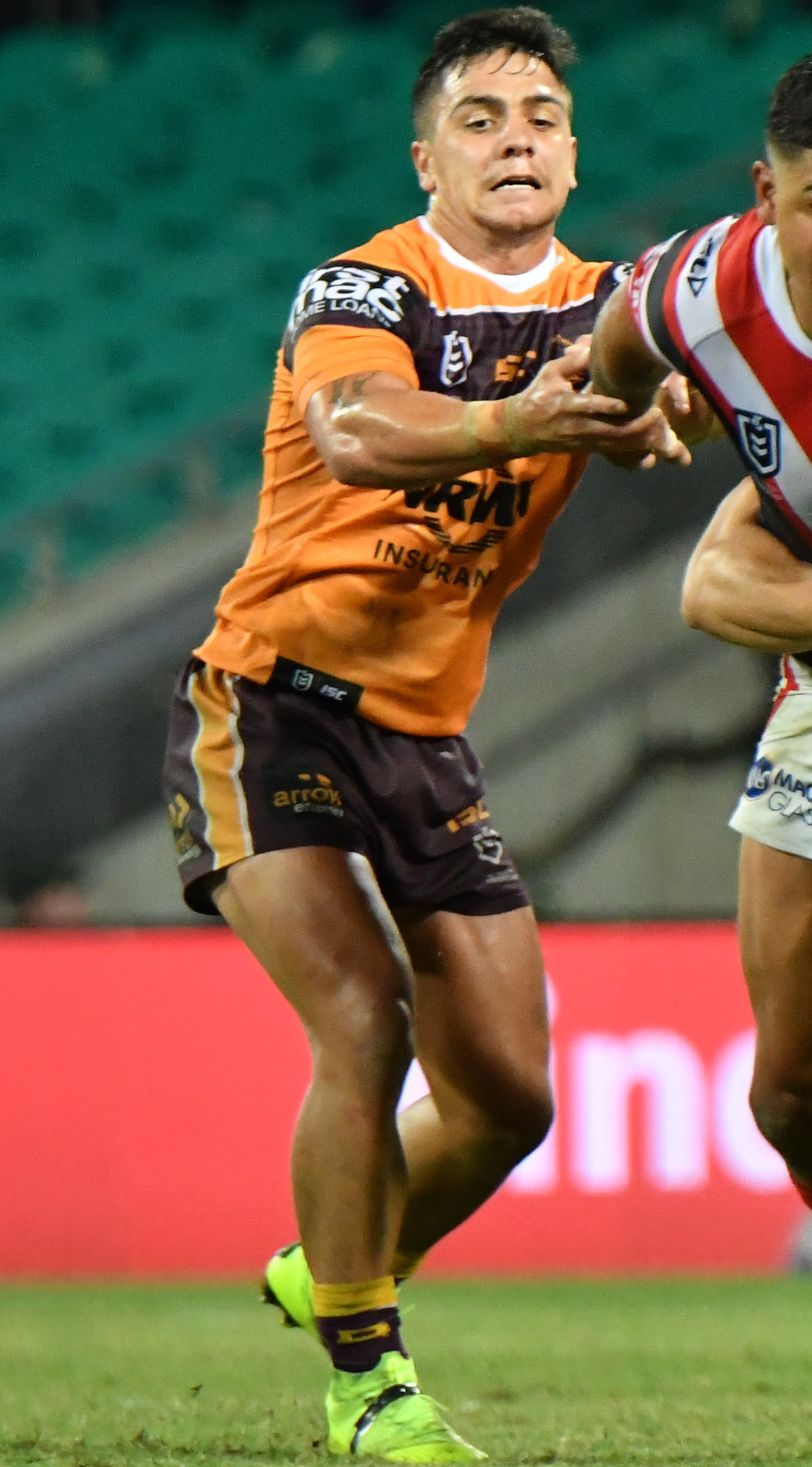
Nikorima playing for the Broncos in 2019

After playing seven games for the Broncos in 2019, Nikorima was told that he would not be guaranteed a position in the halves. The New Zealand Warriors had expressed an interest in him as a half, and Nikorima said that they had offered "a future for me in the position I want to play." Nikorima was granted an immediate release by the Broncos and signed a two-and-a-half-year contract to play for the Warriors. His first game for his new club was their 26-18 victory over St George Illawarra at Suncorp Stadium in Brisbane.

Nikorima made 19 appearances for the New Zealand Warriors in the 2020 NRL season and 21 games in the 2021 NRL season.

=== South Sydney Rabbitohs (2022) ===
On 9 May 2022, Nikorima signed a two-year deal to join South Sydney effective immediately. Nikorima made his club debut for South Sydney against his former club New Zealand in a 32–30 victory at Suncorp Stadium in round 10 of the 2022 NRL season. He played a total of 15 games for South Sydney in the 2022 NRL season including all three of the club's finals matches as they reached the preliminary final, in which Souths lost 12-32 to eventual premiers Penrith.

=== Dolphins (2023-present) ===
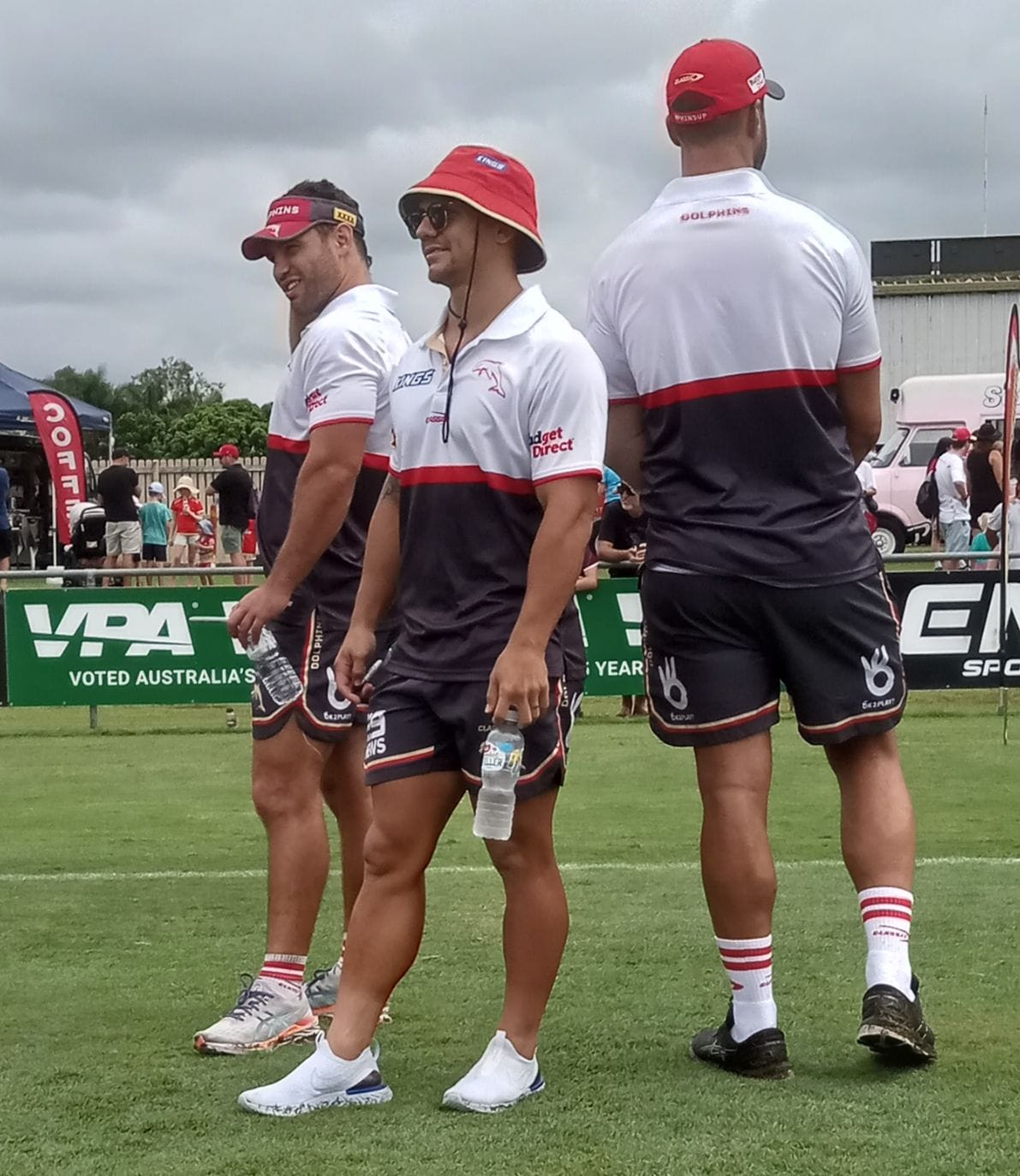
Nikorima (centre) with the Dolphins in 2024

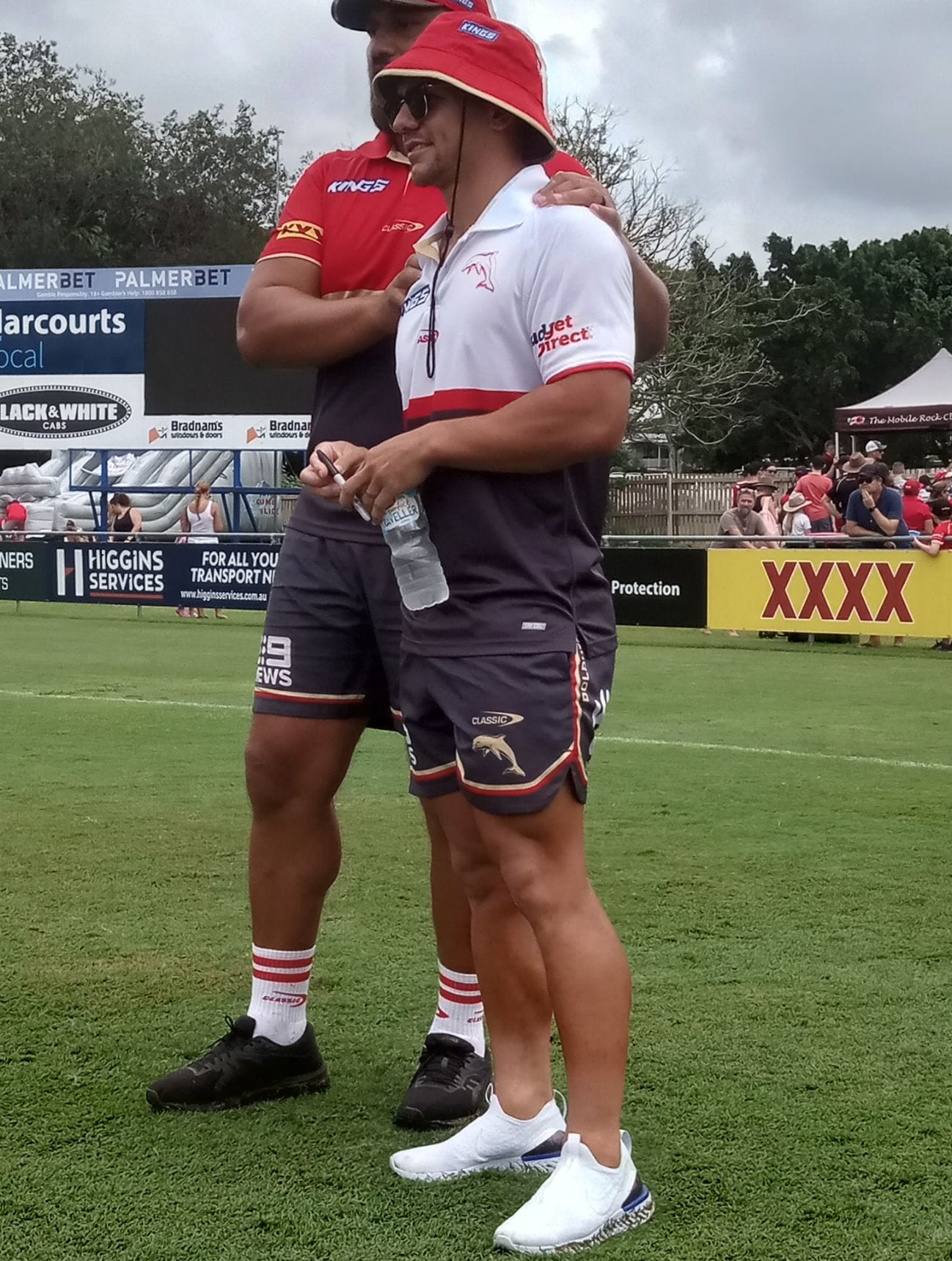
Nikorima in 2024

In 2023, Nikorima made his club debut and scored a try for the Dolphins in round 3 against the Newcastle Knights at McDonald Jones Stadium. In total, he played twenty-one games and scored four tries for the Dolphins in 2023.

On 13 August 2024, it was announced that Nikorima had re-signed with the club on a two year deal. Nikorima played 21 games for the Dolphins in the 2024 NRL season as the club finished 10th on the table.

=== 2025 ===
Nikorima was named for round 1 of the 2025 NRL season but he later withdrew from the match due to Tropical Cyclone Alfred. Nikorima's wife criticised the NRL after they moved the game from Brisbane to Sydney because of the cyclone and it would leave many partners at home alone during that time. Nikorima played 20 games for the Dolphins in the 2025 NRL season as the club narrowly missed out on the finals finishing 9th.

=== 2026 ===
On 29 July 2026, it was announced that Nikorima has signed a two-year deal with the St. George Illawarra Dragons from 2027. He played 22 matches for the club in the 2026 NRL season including their preliminary final loss to eventual premiers the Sydney Roosters.

== Statistics ==
Year	Team	Games	Tries	Goals	FGs	Pts
2015	Brisbane Broncos	20	1	0	0	4
2016	Brisbane Broncos	16	2	0	0	8
2017	Brisbane Broncos	19	7	0	0	28
2018	Brisbane Broncos	24	10	0	0	40
2019	Brisbane Broncos	7	2	0	0	8
2019	New Zealand Warriors	14	3	1	0	14
2020	New Zealand Warriors	19	3	17	1	47
2021	New Zealand Warriors	21	4	42	0	100
2022	New Zealand Warriors	5	1	0	0	4
2022	South Sydney Rabbitohs	15	0	10	0	20
2023	Dolphins	21	4	0	0	16
2024	Dolphins	21	3	1	0	14
2025	Dolphins	20	8	0	0	32
2026	Dolphins	22	4	0	0	16
2027	St. George Illawarra Dragons					
	Totals	244	52	71	1	351
