= Neccrom Areaiiti =

Cook Islands international rugby league footballer (born 1990)

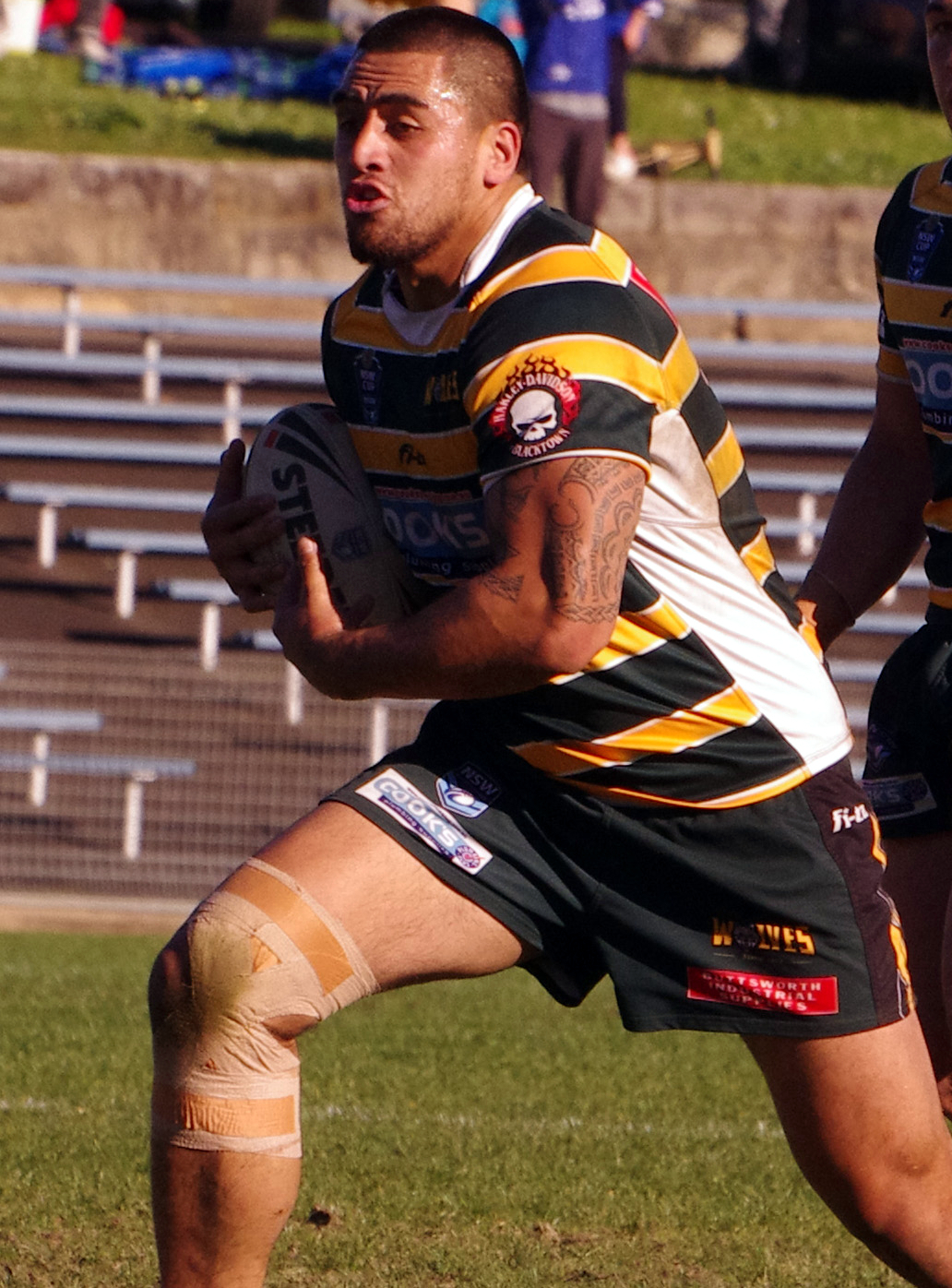

Personal information
- Born: 12 January 1990 (age 36) Auckland, New Zealand
- Height: 189 cm (6 ft 2 in)
- Weight: 109 kg (17 st 2 lb)

Playing information
- Position: Prop
Club
Years	Team	Pld	T	G	FG	P
2012	South Sydney	1	0	0	0	0
Representative
Years	Team	Pld	T	G	FG	P
2012	Cook Islands	1	1	0	0	4
- Source: As of 3 March 2018

Neccrom Areaiiti (born 12 January 1990) is a New Zealand professional rugby league footballer. A Cook Islands international representative, he plays at prop and previously played for the South Sydney Rabbitohs in the National Rugby League.

== Playing career ==
Areaiiti began his career with the Wests Tigers playing in their NYC team in 2009 then going to the New Zealand Warriors and played 25 times for the Junior Warriors in the Toyota Cup, including in the Junior Warriors 2010 Grand Final victory.

In 2011 he joined the South Sydney Rabbitohs and spent the season playing for the North Sydney Bears in the NSW Cup. He was selected for the Cook Islands side for their 2011 test match against the New Zealand national rugby league team, however the match was cancelled. He made his National Rugby League debut for the Rabbitohs on 15 April 2012 against the Warriors.

Areaiiti joined the Penrith Panthers for the 2013 season but never played a game in top grade.

In 2014 Areaiiti signed with the North Sydney Bears. Areaiiti went on to play 54 games in total for Norths.

In 2015 he returned to the Auckland Rugby League, playing for the Manurewa Marlins.
