= Martin Taupau =

NZ & Samoa international rugby league footballer

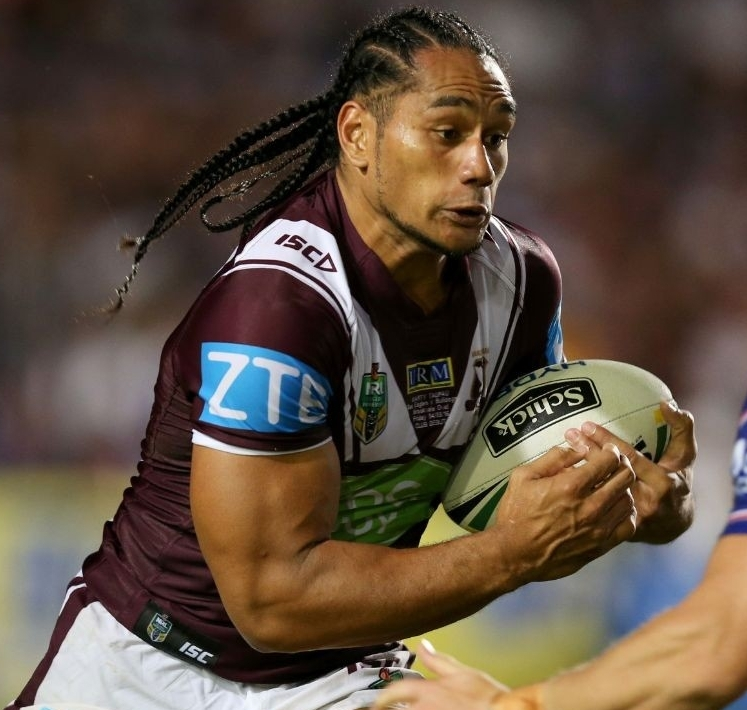

Personal information
- Born: 3 February 1990 (age 36) Auckland, New Zealand
- Height: 190 cm (6 ft 3 in)
- Weight: 112 kg (17 st 9 lb)

Playing information
- Position: Prop, Lock
Club
Years	Team	Pld	T	G	FG	P
2010–13	Canterbury Bulldogs	21	1	0	0	4
2014–15	Wests Tigers	45	7	0	0	28
2016–22	Manly Sea Eagles	156	12	0	0	48
2023–25	Brisbane Broncos	34	1	0	0	4
	Total	256	21	0	0	84
Representative
Years	Team	Pld	T	G	FG	P
2013–22	Samoa	9	0	0	0	0
2014–18	New Zealand	24	0	0	0	0
2016	World All Stars	1	0	0	0	0
- Source: As of 11 April 2025

Martin Taupau (born 3 February 1990) is a former professional rugby league footballer who last played for the Brisbane Broncos as prop and lock and has played for both Samoa and New Zealand at international level.

He previously played for the Manly Warringah Sea Eagles, Canterbury-Bankstown Bulldogs and the Wests Tigers in the National Rugby League (NRL), and for the World All Stars at representative level.

== Background ==
Taupau was born in Auckland, New Zealand. He is of Samoan descent. Taupau moved to Sydney, Australia as a 10-year-old.

He played junior rugby league for the Padstow Panthers and Greenacre Tigers. Taupau attended Endeavour Sports High School and represented the Australia Schoolboys team in 2008.

== Playing career ==
=== 2010 ===
In Round 5, Taupau made his first grade debut against the New Zealand Warriors off the interchange bench in the Bulldogs 30-24 loss at ANZ Stadium, in what was his only appearance of the season. Taupau was selected in the Samoan train on squad and the Junior Kiwis, and captained the Junior Kiwis.

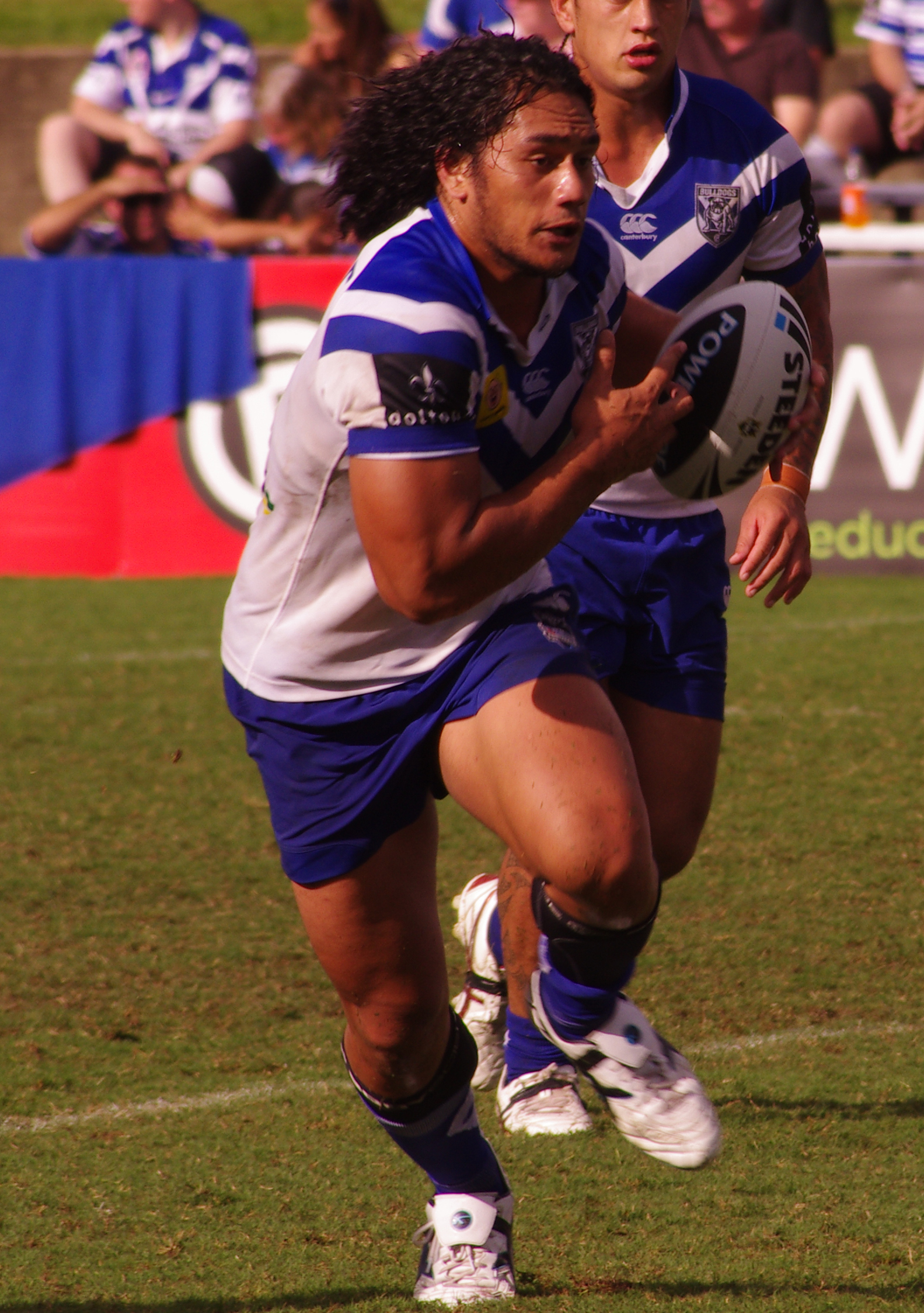
Taupau playing for the Bulldogs in 2012

=== 2011 ===
Taupau played 3 first grade games in the 2011 NRL season. He spent most of the year playing in the NSW Cup, and was named in the New South Wales Residents.

=== 2012 ===
In Round 23 against the Brisbane Broncos, Taupau scored his first NRL career try in the 22-14 win at ANZ Stadium. He finished the season with 6 appearances, all victories.

=== 2013 ===
Taupau played as a starting prop for the first 7 rounds of the season in a period when James Graham was suspended. On 20 April, he made his international début for Samoa against Tonga in the Pacific Rugby League International at Penrith Stadium, playing off the interchange bench in Samoa's 36-4 loss. On 16 June, it was announced that the club had granted Taupau a release to join the Wests Tigers from the 2014 season on a 3-year contract. He finished the season with 11 appearances.

=== 2014 ===
In February, Taupau was selected in the Wests Tigers inaugural Auckland Nines squad. In Round 1 against the St George Illawarra Dragons, he made his debut for the Wests Tigers in the Tigers 44-24 loss at ANZ Stadium, scoring a try in the match. Taupau's good form for the Tigers lead to him being selected to debut for the New Zealand national rugby league team in the May 2014 Anzac Test at SFS. He debuted off the interchange bench in the Kiwis 30-18 loss. Taupau was one of just two players to play in every Wests Tigers game for the season as well as scoring 3 tries, and was the club's second best for metres gained with the ball.

At the end of the year, Taupau played in all four of the Kiwis games as they won the 2014 Rugby League Four Nations. In the final against Australia in the Kiwis 22-18 win, Taupau left the ground with a suspected neck injury, but had already made three tackle breaks, three offloads, and was described as "the toast of the team." The New Zealand Herald said, "Time and again Taupau threw himself into the Australian line to see would-be defenders reeling."

=== 2015 ===
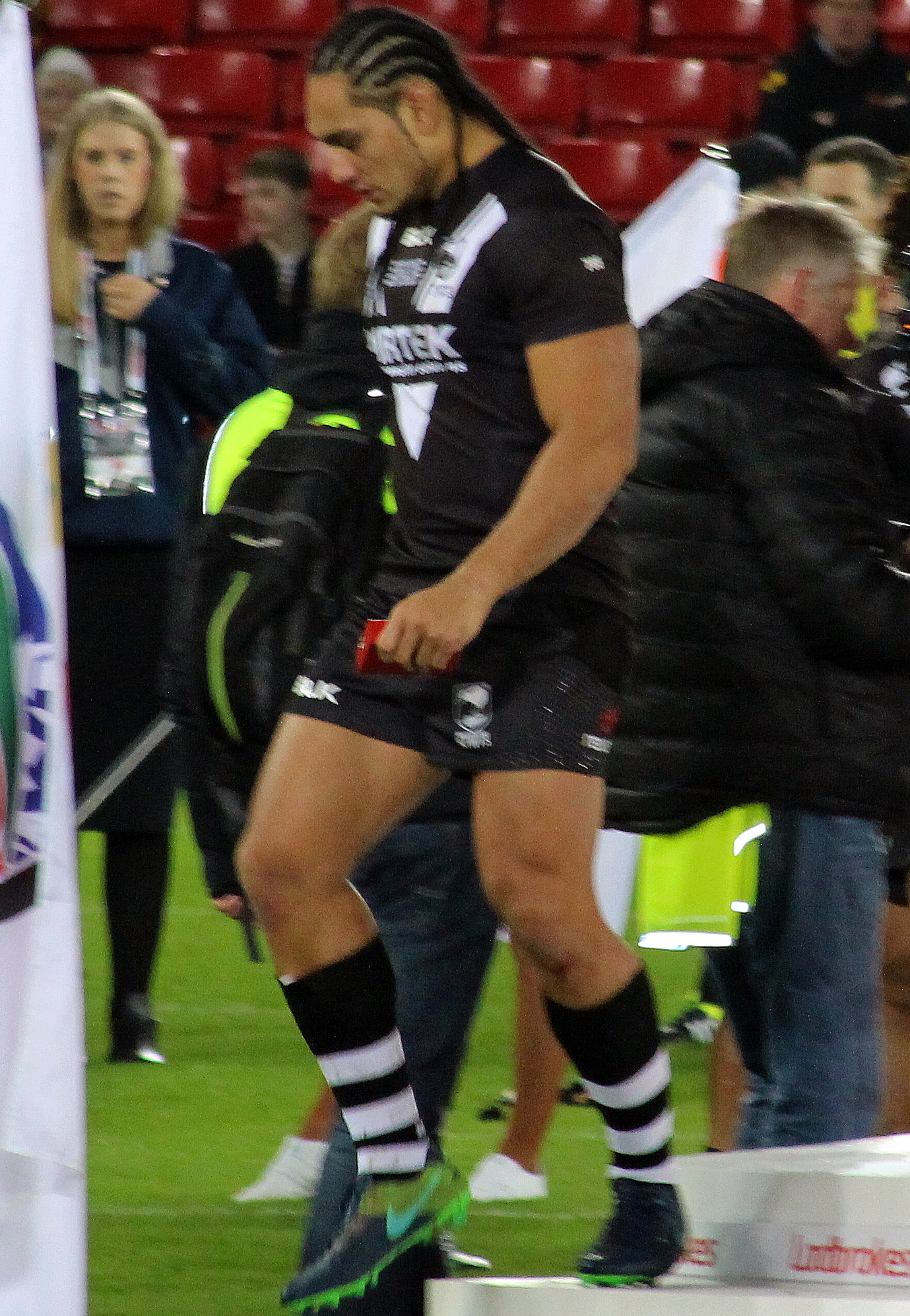
Marty Taupau playing for the Kiwis in 2016

Under new coach Jason Taylor, Taupau began the season playing as the team's starting lock.

On 3 May, Taupau was selected for New Zealand in the 2015 Anzac Test, playing off interchange bench and gained the most metres amongst the New Zealand pack and had the most offloads of any forward for either side in the Kiwis 26-12 win. After receiving a crusher tackle during the game, Taupau made a throat-slitting gesture towards Australian opponent Sam Thaiday. Australian player Corey Parker said, "that's not a good look for the game, gee whiz. If you were a young kid looking in the stands watching that, I don't know what you're going to think." Parker did admit, "I think it would be fair to say 12 months ago you might not have known too much about Marty Taupau, but certainly you do now."

In Round 14 against the South Sydney Rabbitohs in the Tigers shock upset 34-6 win at ANZ Stadium, Taupau scored his first career double. He was said to be, "huge for the Tigers, scoring two brutally powerful tries while providing much-needed aggression and power through the middle of the field." Finishing the season with 21 appearances and scoring 4 tries, Taupau would have completed his 2nd consecutive season without missing a game were it not for a 3-match suspension for a high shot on James Maloney, for which he was "widely panned". On 30 October, Taupau signed a 4-year contract with the Manly Warringah Sea Eagles starting in 2016, after being granted a release from the final year of his Tigers contract. The manner in which Taupau's signing was announced was a bungled affair. As Taupau was in England with the Kiwis on their tour of Great Britain, an e-mail that outlined the contract was supposed to be sent from a UK based solicitor to Manly CEO Joe Kelly. However, in an embarrassing foul up the e-mail was accidentally sent to the G-mail account of Canadian theatre critic J. Kelly Nestruck who then announced Taupau's 4-year deal with the Sea Eagles on his Twitter page. Taupau would go on to play in all 3 matches against England in the Kiwis 2-1 Baskerville Shield series loss.

=== 2016 ===
On 13 February, Taupau played for the World All Stars in the 2016 All Stars match. Initially selected on the interchange bench, the late withdrawal of Chris Lawrence saw him starting in the second row in the 12-8 win. In Round 1, Taupau made his club debut for Manly against the Bulldogs, starting at lock in the 28-6 loss at Brookvale Oval. In Round 2 against his former club the Wests Tigers, Taupau scored his first try for the Sea Eagles in the 36-22 loss at Leichhardt Oval. On 6 May, Taupau played for the Kiwis against Australia, playing off the interchange bench in the 18-0 loss.

=== 2017 ===
In July 2017, Taupau enrolled in a Bachelor of Business degree after developing an interest in marketing and economics and attended lectures at the UTS (University of Technology Sydney) Ultimo campus one night per week after finishing his training with the Sea Eagles at Narrabeen. He has stated on record that he would prefer to be at university studying something than being in the gym lifting weights.

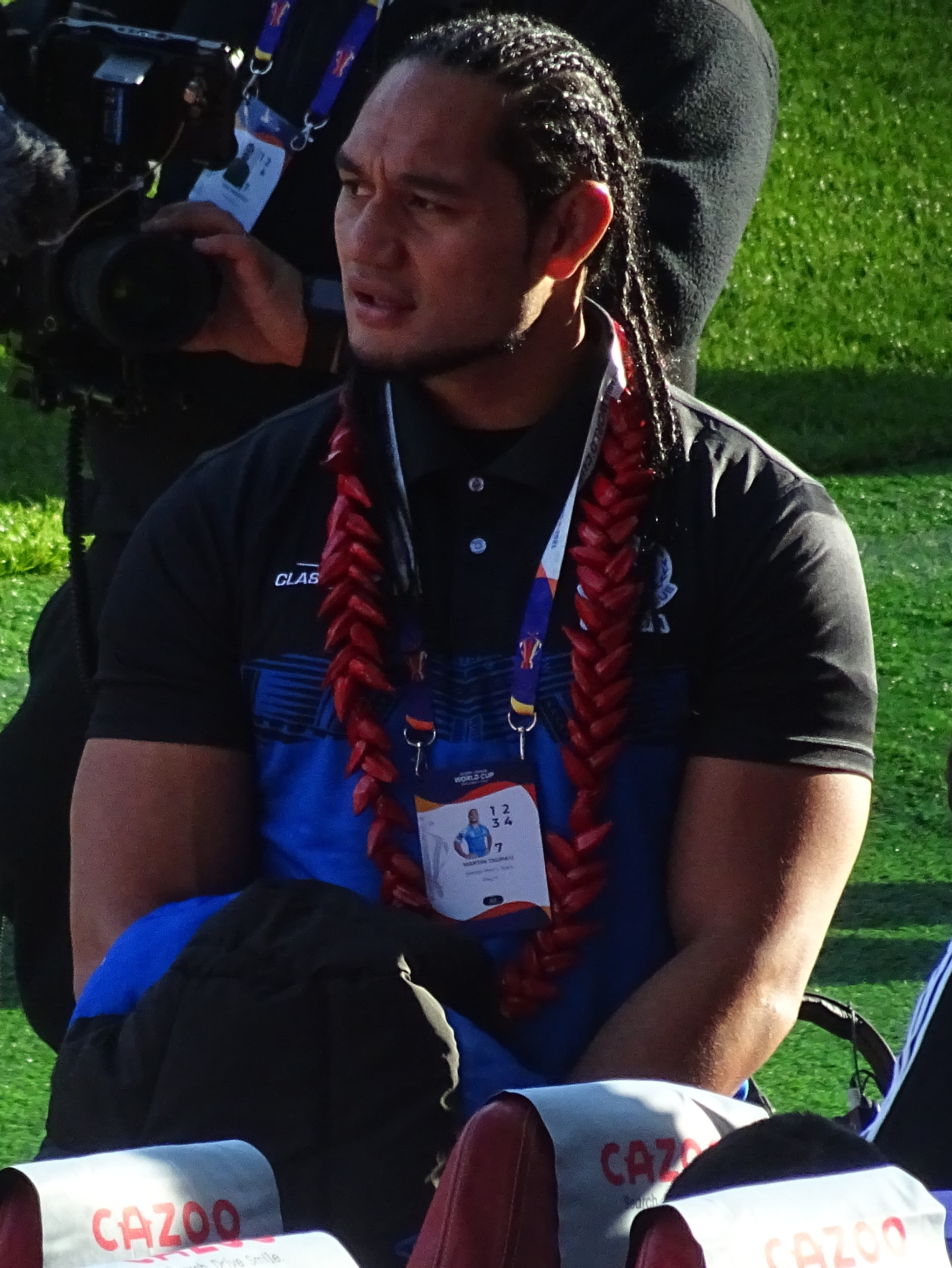
Taupau on international duty with Samoa in 2022

=== 2018 ===
Taupau made 24 appearances for Manly in 2018 as the club endured one of its toughest ever seasons narrowly avoiding the wooden spoon by 2 competition points. There were speculations that Taupau was departing the club following the conclusion of the year to join the Sydney Roosters but the move did not eventuate.

=== 2019 ===
Taupau made 25 appearances for Manly in the 2019 NRL season as the club qualified for the finals after finishing in sixth place. Taupau played in the club's elimination final victory over Cronulla and also featured in Manly's elimination final loss against South Sydney. On 10 December, Taupau signed a contract extension with Manly to remain at the club until the end of the 2022 season.

=== 2020 ===
Taupau played 18 games for Manly in the 2020 NRL season. The club finished a disappointing 13th on the table and missed out on the finals.

=== 2021 ===
Taupau played 26 games for Manly in the 2021 NRL season including the club's preliminary final loss against South Sydney.

=== 2022 ===
It was announced that Manly would not renew Taupau's contract for the 2023 NRL season.

In October, Taupau was named in the Samoa squad for the 2021 Rugby League World Cup.

=== 2023 ===
On 21 January, it was announced that Taupau had signed for Brisbane ahead of the 2023 NRL season. He made his club debut in round 1 against the Penrith Panthers in a 13 - 12 win. He played in the first 17 games of the season for the Brisbane side. On 5 July, it was announced that Taupau had resigned with Brisbane outfit for the 2024 season. Against South Sydney, Taupau was sin binned for a dangerous knee lift.He was given a three-match ban for it. Taupau played a total of 20 games for Brisbane in the 2023 NRL season but did not feature in the clubs finals campaign nor the 2023 NRL Grand Final loss against Penrith.

=== 2024 ===
Taupau played 13 games for Brisbane in the 2024 NRL season which saw the club miss the finals finishing 12th on the table. On 4 November, the Brisbane outfit announced that Taupau had re-signed a one year extension with the club.

=== 2025 ===
On 17 May, it was announced that Taupau would be released from the remainder of his Brisbane contract after he had liked a post from former player Elijah Taylor that criticised the coaching techniques of Brisbane coach Michael Maguire. Brisbane would go on to win the premiership in 2025 defeating Melbourne in the grand final. Taupau later spoke of the sacking saying that he tried to reach out to Maguire by shaking his hand and apologising but Maguire rejected this from Taupau. Taupau then went on to say that he did not join the Brisbane club for the after party following their premiership victory due to the incident.

== Statistics ==
Year	Team	Games	Tries	Pts
2011	Canterbury-Bankstown Bulldogs	3		
2012	Canterbury-Bankstown Bulldogs	6	1	4
2013	Canterbury-Bankstown Bulldogs	11		
2014	Wests Tigers	24	3	12
2015	Wests Tigers	21	4	16
2016	Manly Warringah Sea Eagles	20	3	12
2017	Manly Warringah Sea Eagles	22	1	4
2018	Manly Warringah Sea Eagles	24		
2019	Manly Warringah Sea Eagles	25	2	8
2020	Manly Warringah Sea Eagles	18	2	8
2021	Manly Warringah Sea Eagles	26	2	8
2022	Manly Warringah Sea Eagles	21	2	8
2023	Brisbane Broncos	20		
2024	Brisbane Broncos	13	1	4
2025	Brisbane Broncos	1		
	Totals	256	21	84

*denotes season competing
