= Cornish Americans =

Americans of Cornish birth or descent

Amerikanyon gernewek (Cornish)

Regions with significant populations
- California, Michigan, Montana, Minnesota, Pennsylvania and Wisconsin; Particularly in the cities of Butte, Duluth, Hibbing, Marquette, Mineral Point, Sault Ste. Marie/Sault Ste. Marie, Ontario

Languages
- English (American English dialects), Cornish

Religion
- Methodism

Related ethnic groups
- Cornish, English Americans, Welsh Americans, Breton Americans, Manx Americans, Scottish Americans, Scotch-Irish Americans, Irish Americans

Cornish Americans (Cornish: Amerikanyon gernewek) are Americans who describe themselves as having Cornish ancestry, an ethnic group of Brittonic Celts native to Cornwall and the Scilly Isles, part of the United Kingdom. Although Cornish ancestry is not recognized on the United States Census, Bernard Deacon at the Institute of Cornish Studies estimates there are close to two million people of Cornish descent in the U.S., compared to half a million in Cornwall itself and only half of those Cornish by descent.

== Cornish immigration to the United States ==
Tangier Island is an island in lower Chesapeake Bay in Virginia: some inhabitants have a West Country accent that traces back to the settlers (including the Cornish) who arrived there in the 1600s.

The coincidence of the decline of the mining industry in Cornwall in the 19th century and the discovery of large amounts of mineral deposits abroad meant that Cornish families headed overseas for work. Each decade between 1861 and 1901, a fifth of the entire Cornish male population migrated abroad – three times the average for England and Wales. In total, the county lost over a quarter of a million people between 1841 and 1901.

Large numbers of Cornish people moved to the United States, and while some stayed in New York City and other East Coast ports after arriving, many moved inland to mining areas in California, Wisconsin, Pennsylvania and Michigan (mainly the Upper Peninsula of Michigan). One such area was Mineral Point, Wisconsin, in which the largest group of immigrants were Cornish miners attracted to the lead mining opportunities, and by 1845 roughly half of the town's population had Cornish ancestry. Today the Cornish town of Redruth is twinned with Mineral Point.

== Cornish culture in the United States ==
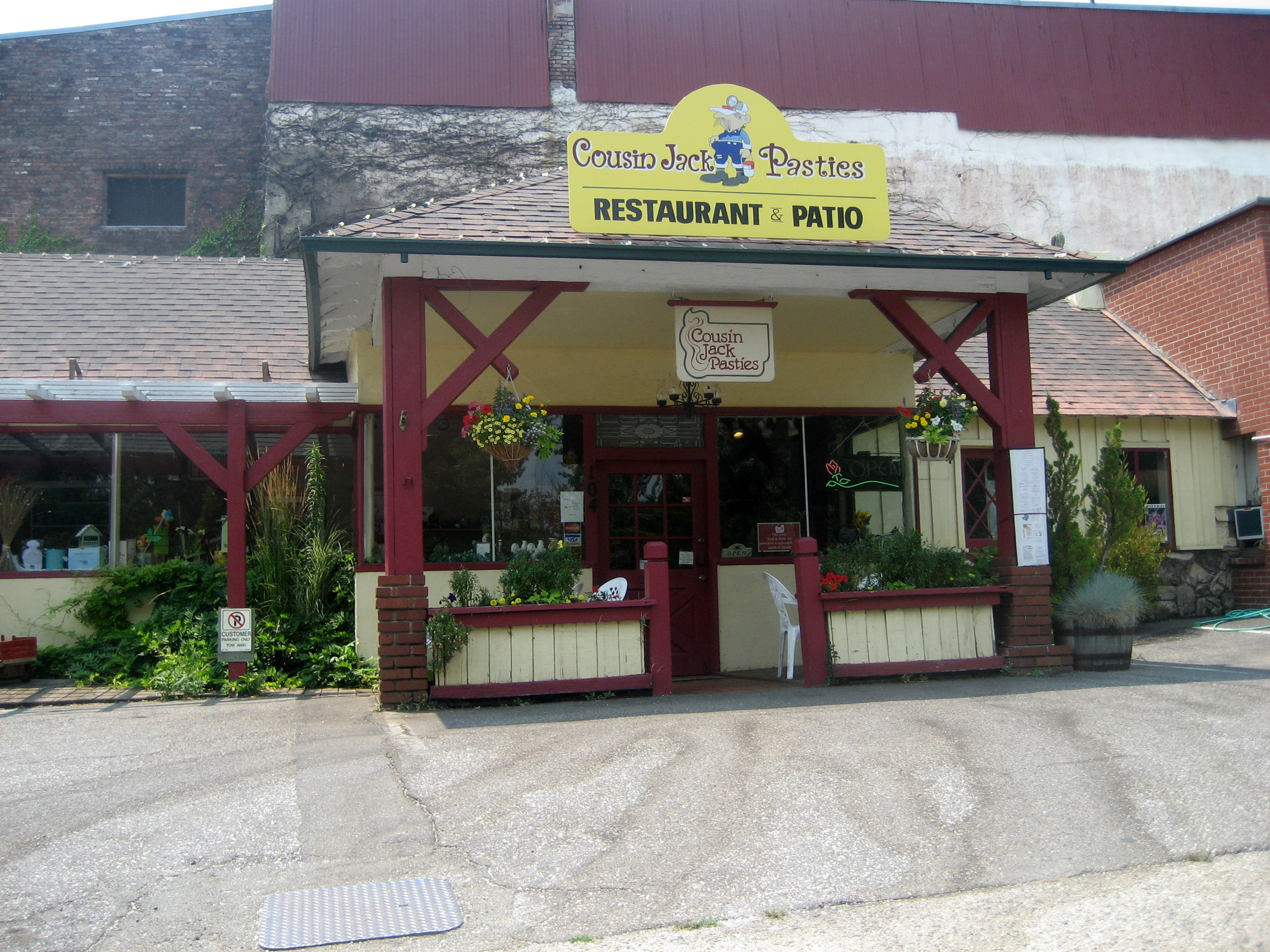
A "Cousin Jack's" pasty shop in Grass Valley, California

Mineral Point, Wisconsin serves Cornish food, such as pasties and figgyhobbin, and Cornish pasties are sold at ex-Cornish mining towns in America, especially in Butte, Montana and the Upper Peninsula of Michigan.

In California, statues and monuments in many towns pay tribute to the influence of the Cornish on their development. In the city of Grass Valley, the tradition of singing Cornish carols lives on and one local historian of the area says the songs have become "the identity of the town". Some of the members of today's Cornish Carol Choir are in fact descendants of the original Cornish gold miners. The city holds St Piran's Day celebrations every year, which along with carol singing, includes a flag raising ceremony, games involving the Cornish pasty, and Cornish wrestling competitions. The city is twinned with Bodmin in Cornwall.

Cornish culture continues to have an influence in the Copper Country of northern Michigan, the Iron Ranges of northern Michigan, Wisconsin and Minnesota, and Butte, Montana.

There were many famous Cornish wrestling champions from the U.S. including many world champions.

Cornish immigrant miners are depicted in the TV series Deadwood as speaking their native language, even though Cornish had died out in the 18th century before a revival in the 20th century. The actors in these scenes are, in fact, speaking Irish, a fellow Celtic language, but not mutually intelligible (Irish comes from the Goidelic branch of languages, whereas Cornish comes from the Brittonic branch alongside Welsh).

Legends of the Fall, a novella by American author Jim Harrison, detailing the lives of a Cornish American family in the early 20th century, contains several Cornish language terms. These were also included in the Academy Award-winning film of the same name starring Anthony Hopkins as Col. William Ludlow and Brad Pitt as Tristan Ludlow.

== Notable people ==
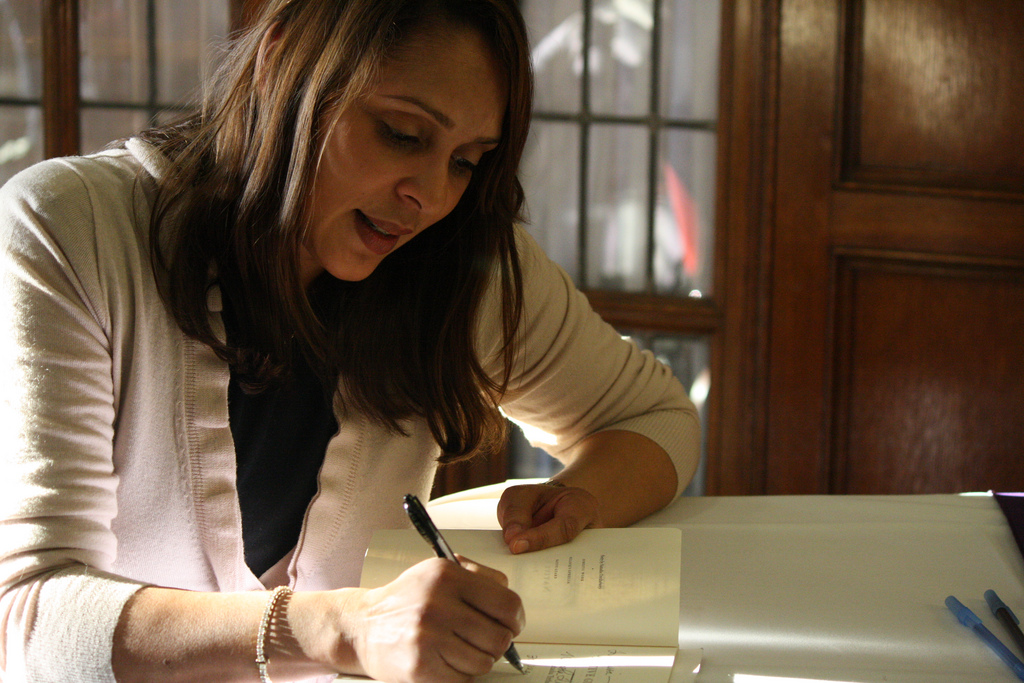
Natasha Trethewey, United States Poet Laureate

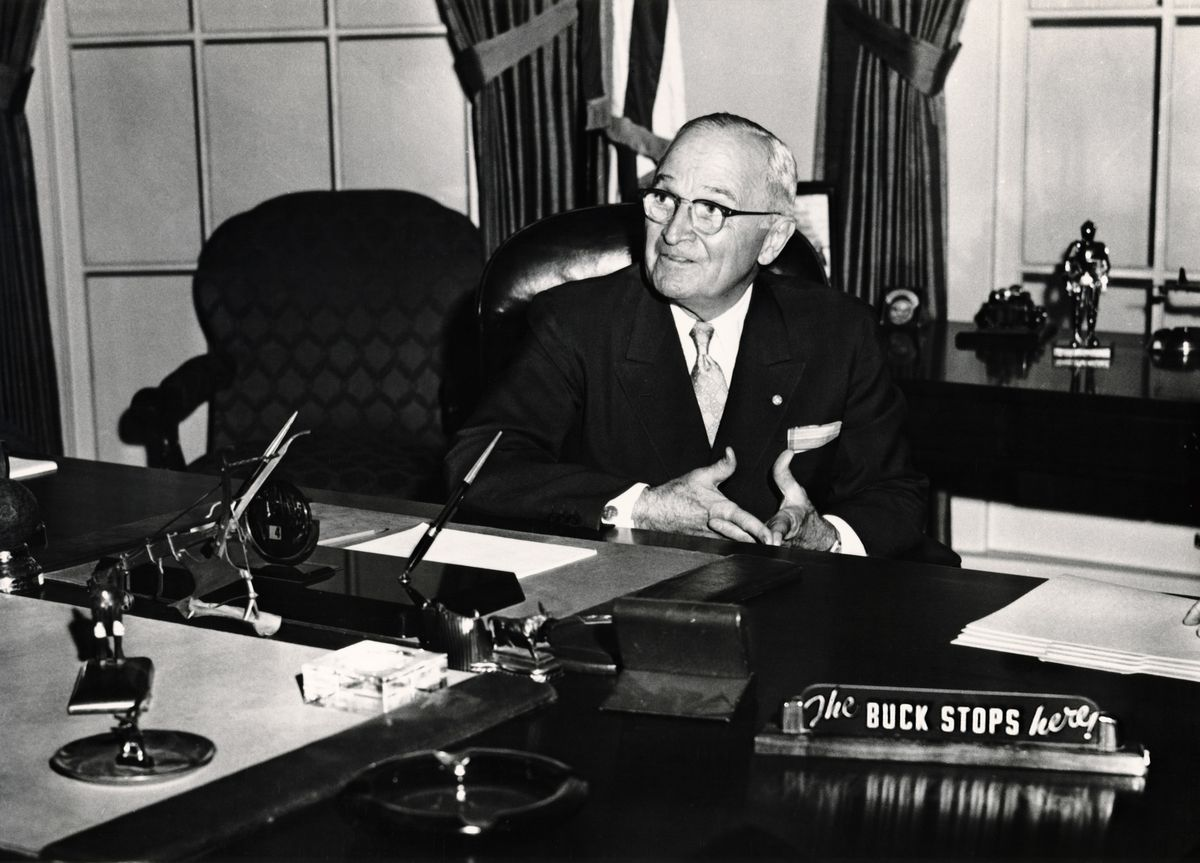
President Truman, possibly a Cornish Tremaine

Several notable Americans were either born in Cornwall or have family connections to the county.

- Mark Twain – Samuel Langhorne Clemens (November 30, 1835 – April 21, 1910), better known by his pen name Mark Twain, was an American author and humorist. He is noted for his novels Adventures of Huckleberry Finn (1885), called "the Great American Novel", and The Adventures of Tom Sawyer (1876). The Clemens family originally came from Looe, Cornwall
- Richard Bullock – became a legendary figure of the Wild West cowboy era. His quick-shooting deeds working on the Deadwood stage gained him the nickname "Deadwood Dick"
- Colin Trevorrow – an American film director and screenwriter. The surname Trevorrow originates in the village of Ludgvan near Penzance
- Jayne Mansfield – an American actress working both on Broadway and in Hollywood. Her ancestors moved from Cornwall to Pen Argyl to work slate Her daughter is the actress Mariska Hargitay
- Edie Falco – an American television, film and stage actress. Her ancestor was a Cornish master mariner, from Penzance
- Dirk Kempthorne – United States Secretary of the Interior, Governor of Idaho, United States Senator representing Idaho, and Mayor of Boise, who has immigrant ancestors from Cornwall
- Rick Rescorla – a retired United States Army officer of Cornish birth who served with distinction in Rhodesia as a British soldier and the Vietnam War as an American officer. Rescorla was World Trade Center security chief for the financial services firm Morgan Stanley, and died in the attacks of September 11, 2001, while leading the evacuation efforts
- John Spargo – a Cornish-born American socialist writer and muckraker
- William Williams – a Cornish immigrant to Saint Paul, Minnesota who was convicted of the 1905 murders of his homosexual lover and the latter's mother. His hanging was botched and Williams remains the last person executed by the State of Minnesota
- Natasha Trethewey – an American Pulitzer Prize-winning poet who was made United States Poet Laureate and also Poet Laureate of Mississippi in 2012. Her father, Eric Trethewey (from Canada), is also a poet and professor of English at Hollins University Trethewey is a Cornish language-derived surname
- Elizabeth Arden – Florence Nightingale Graham (December 31, 1884 – October 18, 1966), who went by the business name Elizabeth Arden, was a Canadian-American businesswoman who built a cosmetics empire in the United States. At the peak of her career, she was one of the wealthiest women in the world. Her mother was Cornish, her father Scottish, having met in Cornwall
- Harry S. Truman – Truman, the 33rd President of the United States (1945–1953), may have been a descendant of the Cornish Tremayne family although he himself disliked this theory, preferring an Anglo-Saxon origin. The President said that he believed the "Tremaine thing is a lot of bunk" but conceded, "Maybe I'm wrong. Anyway as I've told you so long as we don't find Captain Kidd, Morgan the Pirate or J.P. [Morgan] either, for that matter, in 'the line' I'm satisfied."
- Rutherford B. Hayes – the 19th President of the United States (1877–1881), was descended from Thomas Burgess, an emigrant from Truro, Cornwall, to Salem, Massachusetts in the 17th century
- Franklin D. Roosevelt – the 32nd President of the United States (1933–1945), was, like Hayes, a descendant of Thomas Burgess, whose grandmother happened to be a Trethewey
- Donald Bertrand Tresidder was the fourth president of Stanford University, serving from 1943 until his sudden death in 1948. He also had a longtime association with Yosemite National Park
- Samuel Pasco – U.S. Senator from Florida, Florida State Representative, and Clerk of Court of Jefferson County. Born in London to Cornish parents

== See also ==
- Celtic Britons
- Cornish language
- Cornish emigration
- Cornish Australians
- Notable Cornish wrestlers from the United States
- Mining in Cornwall and Devon
- Celtic music in the United States
- List of people from Cornwall
- British American
- Scottish American
- Scots-Irish American
- Welsh American
- Breton American
- Dumnonia
- Kernow
- Maps of American ancestries
- Pen Argyl, Pennsylvania
