= Scottish Americans =

Americans of Scottish birth or descent

Ameireaganaich Albannach (Scottish Gaelic)
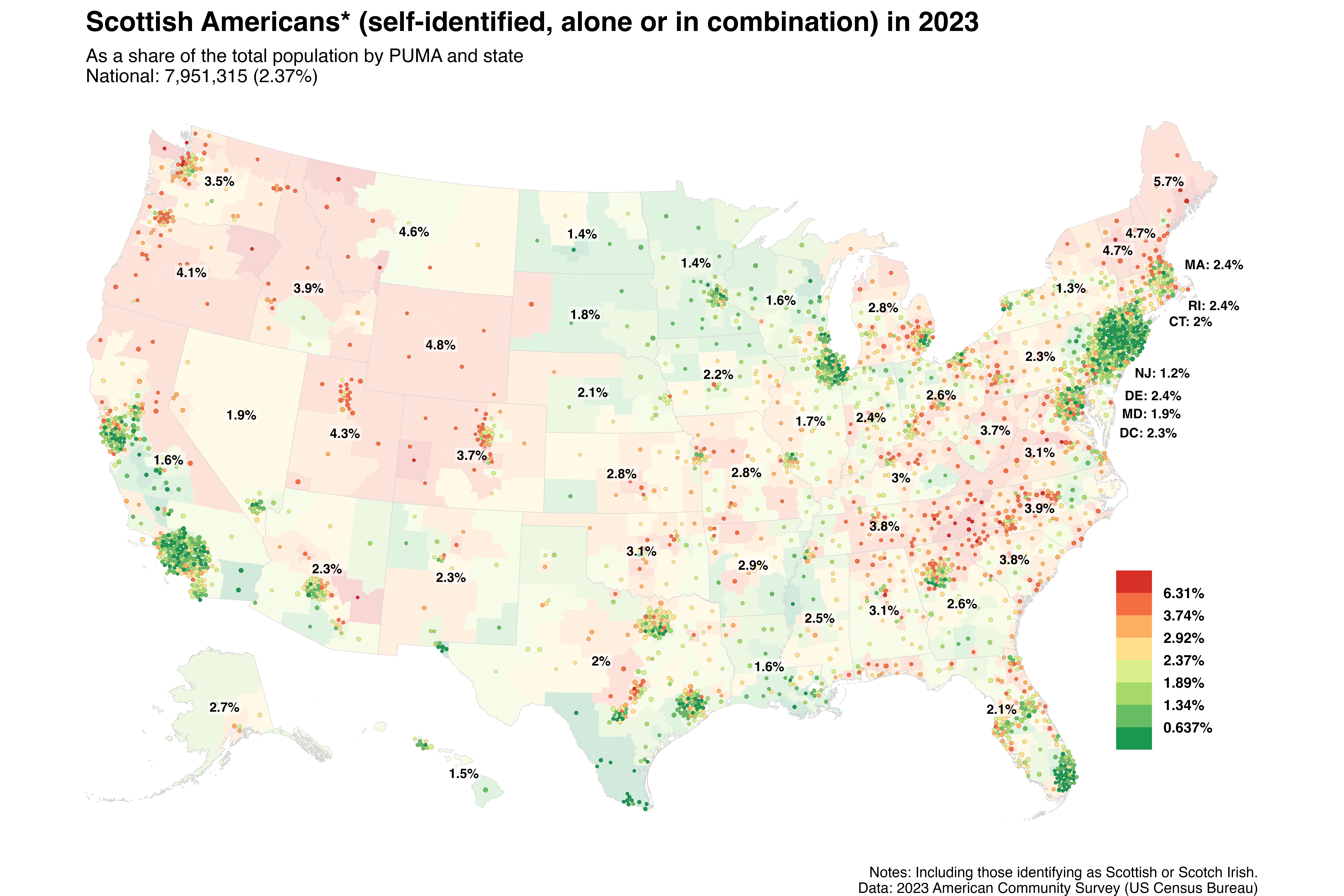

Total population
- 8,422,613 (3.6%)▲ Scottish alone or in combination 1,471,817 (0.7%) Scottish alone 794,478 (0.3%)▼ Scots-Irish alone or in combination 2020 census Other estimates 20–25 million Up to 8.3% of the U.S. population

Regions with significant populations
- Predominantly in New England, Appalachia and the Deep South; Plurality in New York, Massachusetts, Pennsylvania, Illinois, Wisconsin, Delaware, Maryland, Virginia, West Virginia, North Carolina, Georgia, Florida, Kentucky, Minnesota, Idaho, Texas, Washington, Colorado and California

Languages
- English (American English dialects); Scottish Gaelic and Scots speaking minorities, Scottish Cant

Religion
- Christianity (including Presbyterianism, Baptist, Pentecostalism, Methodist, Protestantism and Roman Catholicism), other religions (including deism)

Related ethnic groups
- Scots-Irish Americans, English Americans, Irish Americans, Welsh Americans, Manx Americans, British Americans, Cornish Americans, Scottish Canadians, Scotch-Irish Canadians, Scottish Australians, and other Scots

Scottish Americans or Scots Americans (Scottish Gaelic: Ameireaganaich Albannach; Scots: Scots-American) are Americans whose ancestry originates wholly or partly in Scotland. Scottish Americans are closely related to Scotch-Irish Americans, descendants of Ulster Scots, and communities emphasize and celebrate a common heritage. The majority of Scotch-Irish Americans originally came from Lowland Scotland and Northern England before migrating to the province of Ulster in Ireland (see Plantation of Ulster) and thence, beginning about five generations later, to North America in large numbers during the eighteenth century. The number of Scottish Americans is believed to be around 25 million, and celebrations of Scottish identity can be seen through Tartan Day parades, Burns Night celebrations, and Tartan Kirking ceremonies.

Significant emigration from Scotland to America began in the 1700s, accelerating after the Jacobite rising of 1745, the steady degradation of clan structures, and the Highland Clearances. During the 18th century, the "push" elements of emigration decisions were set alongside the "pull" of the many opportunities for Scots in the British Empire created by the Act of Union. At this stage, those leaving included members of the lower-ranking gentry; for instance, emigrants from the Highlands had among them tacksmen (Note: The tacksmen of the Highlands were the middle stratum of the society, renting land from the lairds and subletting it to the individual farming tenants.) and some wealthier farmers who chose not to accept the changes being imposed in the earliest phases of the Highland clearances.

Even higher rates of emigration occurred after these times of social upheaval. In the second half of the 19th century, Scotland was losing to emigration, in the years 1855–1860, an amount equal to 28% of its natural population increase; this rose to 54% in 1881–1890 and 84% by 1901–1910. (Note: The ready availability of steamships for travel across the Atlantic greatly changed the economics of emigration. By 1870, the vast majority of those emigrating to North America traveled in steamships, whilst in the first half of the 1860s around 45% went in sailing ships. Although ticket prices were higher for steam, the duration of the journey was substantially less (by sail, a voyage could be 6 weeks – by the early part of the 20th century a steamship could take as little as 7 days). This was time that was not spent earning money - so the economics were strongly in favor of steamships.)

In the 1920s, Scotland experienced a reduction in total population of 0.8%, totally absorbing the natural population increase of 7.2%: the U.S. and Canada were the most common destinations of these emigrants. (Note: From 1919 to 1938, out of a total of 494,093 emigrants from Scotland, 40% went to Canada and 36% to the United States. There was some reverse flow of emigrants; in the same period 49,714 people emigrated from the U.S. to Scotland – the presumption being that most are returning emigrants. For reference, the population of Scotland in 1911 was 4,472,103.) Despite emphasis on the struggles and 'forced exile' of Jacobites and Highland clansmen in popular media, Scottish migration was mostly from the Lowland regions. The vast bulk of Scottish emigration was at times when the domestic economy was doing well. The idea that the typical emigrant was escaping poverty is not supported by the evidence. Those who left, while being a diverse cross-section of all of Scottish society, included many whose abilities were considered by some to be a worrying loss to Scotland.

== Numbers ==
The table shows the ethnic Scottish population in the British colonies from 1700 to 1775. In 1700 the total population of the colonies was 250,888, of whom 223,071 (89%) were white and 3.0% were ethnically Scottish.

Composition of the American Colonies
1700	%	1755	%	1775	%
English / Welsh	80.0	English / Welsh	52.0	English	48.7
African	11.0	African	20.0	African	20.0
Dutch	4.0	German	7.0	Scots-Irish	7.8
Scottish	3.0	Scots-Irish	7.0	German	6.9
Other European	2.0	Irish	5.0	Scottish	6.6
		Scottish	4.0	Dutch	2.7
		Dutch	3.0	French	1.4
		Other European	2.0	Swedish	0.6
				Other	5.3
Colonies	100.0	Thirteen	100.0	Colonies	100.0

=== 1790 population of Scottish and Scotch-Irish origin by state ===
Population estimates are as follows.

State or Territory	Scotland		Ulster		(Scotland) Scottish Total	
State or Territory	(Scotland) Scotch		(Northern Ireland) Scotch-Irish		(Scotland) Scottish Total	
State or Territory	#	%	#	%	#	%
Connecticut	5,109	2.20%	4,180	1.80%	9,289	4.00%
Delaware	3,705	8.00%	2,918	6.30%	6,623	14.30%
Georgia	8,197	15.50%	6,082	11.50%	14,279	27.00%
Kentucky & (Tennessee) Tenn.	9,305	10.00%	6,513	7.00%	15,818	17.00%
Maine	4,325	4.50%	7,689	8.00%	12,014	12.50%
Maryland	15,857	7.60%	12,102	5.80%	27,959	13.40%
Massachusetts	16,420	4.40%	9,703	2.60%	26,123	7.00%
New Hampshire	8,749	6.20%	6,491	4.60%	15,240	10.80%
New Jersey	13,087	7.70%	10,707	6.30%	23,794	14.00%
New York	22,006	7.00%	16,033	5.10%	38,039	12.10%
North Carolina	42,799	14.80%	16,483	5.70%	59,282	20.50%
Pennsylvania	36,410	8.60%	46,571	11.00%	82,981	19.60%
Rhode Island	3,751	5.80%	1,293	2.00%	5,044	7.80%
South Carolina	21,167	15.10%	13,177	9.40%	34,344	24.50%
Vermont	4,339	5.10%	2,722	3.20%	7,061	8.30%
Virginia	45,096	10.20%	27,411	6.20%	72,507	16.40%
(Thirteen Colonies) 1790 Census Area	260,322	8.21%	190,075	5.99%	450,397	14.20%
(Ohio) Northwest Territory	428	4.08%	307	2.92%	735	7.00%
(New France) French America	305	1.53%	220	1.10%	525	2.63%
(Spanish Empire) Spanish America	83	0.35%	60	0.25%	143	0.60%
United States	261,138	8.09%	190,662	5.91%	451,800	14.00%

=== Data results per census ===
Scottish origins
Year	Population	%
1980	10,048,816	4.44
1990	5,393,581	2.2
2000	4,890,581	1.7
2010	5,460,679	3.1
2020	5,298,861	1.6
Scotch-Irish origins
Year	Population	%
1980	16,418	0.007
1990	5,617,773	2.3
2000	4,319,232	1.5
2010	3,257,161	1.9
2020	2,937,156	0.9

The number of Americans of Scottish descent today is estimated to be 20 to 25 million (up to 8.3% of the total U.S. population).

The majority of Scotch-Irish Americans originally came from Lowland Scotland and Northern England before migrating to the province of Ulster in Ireland (see Plantation of Ulster) and thence, beginning about five generations later, to North America in large numbers during the eighteenth century.

In the 2000 census, 4.8 million Americans self-reported Scottish ancestry, 1.7% of the total U.S. population. Over 4.3 million self-reported Scotch-Irish ancestry, for a total of 9.2 million Americans self-reporting some kind of Scottish descent. Self-reported numbers are regarded by demographers as massive under-counts, because Scottish ancestry is known to be disproportionately under-reported among the majority of mixed ancestry, and because areas where people reported "American" ancestry were the places where, historically, Scottish and Scotch-Irish Protestants settled in North America (that is: along the North American coast, Appalachia, and the Southeastern United States). Scottish Americans descended from nineteenth-century Scottish emigrants tend to be concentrated in the West, while many in New England are the descendants of emigrants, often Gaelic-speaking, from the Maritime Provinces of Canada, from the 1880s onward. The Western U.S. in particular, especially the Northwest, had a mix of immigration direct from Scotland, post-Civil War migration from the upland South, as well as down from Canada. Americans of Scottish descent outnumber the population of Scotland, where 4,459,071 or 88.09% of people identified as ethnic Scottish in the 2001 Census.

=== Scottish origins by state ===
The states with the largest populations of either Scottish or Scotch Irish ancestral origin:

- California – 677,055 (1.7% of state population)
- Texas – 628,610 (2.8%)
- North Carolina – 475,322 (4.5%)
- Florida – 469,782 (2.3%)
- Pennsylvania – 325,588 (2.5%)
- Ohio – 314,214 (2.7%)
- Georgia – 293,211 (2.8%)
- Washington – 289,953 (3.0%)

The states with the top percentages of Scottish or Scotch-Irish residents:

- Maine (6.0% of state population)
- Vermont (5.5%)
- New Hampshire (5.3%)
- Utah (5.0%)
- Wyoming and North Carolina (4.5% each)
- South Carolina (4.4%)
- Idaho and Tennessee (4.2% each)
- Oregon (4.0%)

The metropolitan and micropolitan areas with the top percentage of Scottish or Scotch-Irish residents:

- Boone, NC (9.1% of micropolitan area population)
- Barre, VT and Sevierville, TN (8.3% each)
- Asheville, NC (8.1%)
- Marion, NC and Pinehurst-Southern Pines, NC (7.7% each)
- Jackson, WY and Lebanon, NH (7.0%)
- Cullowhee, NC (6.8%)
- Craig, CO (6.5% each)
- Morehead City, NC, Morristown, TN and Sandpoint, ID (6.4% each)

==== 2020 population of Scottish ancestry by state ====
As of 2020, the distribution of Scottish Americans across the 50 states and DC is as presented in the following table.

State	Number	Percentage
Alabama	87,580	1.79%
Alaska	15,847	2.15%
Arizona	121,027	1.69%
Arkansas	50,645	1.68%
California	469,465	1.19%
Colorado	141,047	2.48%
Connecticut	57,244	1.60%
Delaware	15,162	1.57%
District of Columbia	9,334	1.33%
Florida	307,942	1.45%
Georgia	175,420	1.67%
Hawaii	13,353	0.94%
Idaho	56,132	3.20%
Illinois	143,341	1.13%
Indiana	111,825	1.67%
Iowa	47,555	1.51%
Kansas	54,892	1.88%
Kentucky	83,099	1.86%
Louisiana	45,863	0.98%
Maine	59,957	4.47%
Maryland	86,980	1.44%
Massachusetts	139,846	2.03%
Michigan	207,358	2.08%
Minnesota	65,460	1.17%
Mississippi	42,981	1.44%
Missouri	103,300	1.69%
Montana	31,367	2.95%
Nebraska	26,024	1.35%
Nevada	45,459	1.50%
New Hampshire	55,700	4.11%
New Jersey	85,422	0.96%
New Mexico	30,353	1.45%
New York	193,749	0.99%
North Carolina	232,425	2.24%
North Dakota	9,068	1.19%
Ohio	206,680	1.77%
Oklahoma	68,254	1.73%
Oregon	116,471	2.79%
Pennsylvania	185,046	1.45%
Rhode Island	17,645	1.67%
South Carolina	114,376	2.25%
South Dakota	10,655	1.21%
Tennessee	139,040	2.05%
Texas	378,812	1.32%
Utah	131,724	4.18%
Vermont	26,678	4.27%
Virginia	167,384	1.97%
Washington	199,129	2.65%
West Virginia	35,898	1.99%
Wisconsin	60,705	1.05%
Wyoming	18,142	3.12%
United States	5,298,861	1.62%

A significant of Scottish Gypsies number made their way to the United States after 1880.

Many African Americans have Scottish ancestry because Scottish people had owned black slaves in the Southern United States.

== Historical contributions ==
=== Explorers ===
The first Scots in North America came with the Vikings. A Christian bard from the Hebrides accompanied Bjarni Herjolfsson on his voyage around Greenland in 985/6 which sighted the mainland to the west.

The first Scots recorded as having set foot in the New World were a man named Haki and a woman named Hekja, slaves owned by Leif Eiriksson. The Scottish couple were runners who scouted for Thorfinn Karlsefni's expedition in c. 1010, gathering wheat and the grapes for which Vinland was named.

The controversial Zeno letters have been cited in support of a claim that Henry Sinclair, earl of Orkney, visited Nova Scotia in 1398.

In the early years of Spanish colonization of the Americas, a Scot named Tam Blake spent 20 years in Colombia and Mexico. He took part in the conquest of New Granada in 1532 with Alonso de Heredia. He arrived in Mexico in 1534–5, and joined Coronado's 1540 expedition to the American Southwest.

=== Traders ===
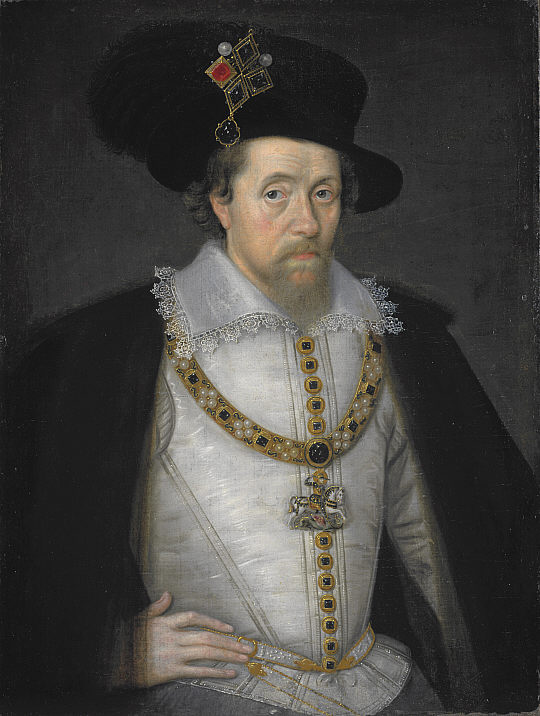
James VI and I, c. 1604

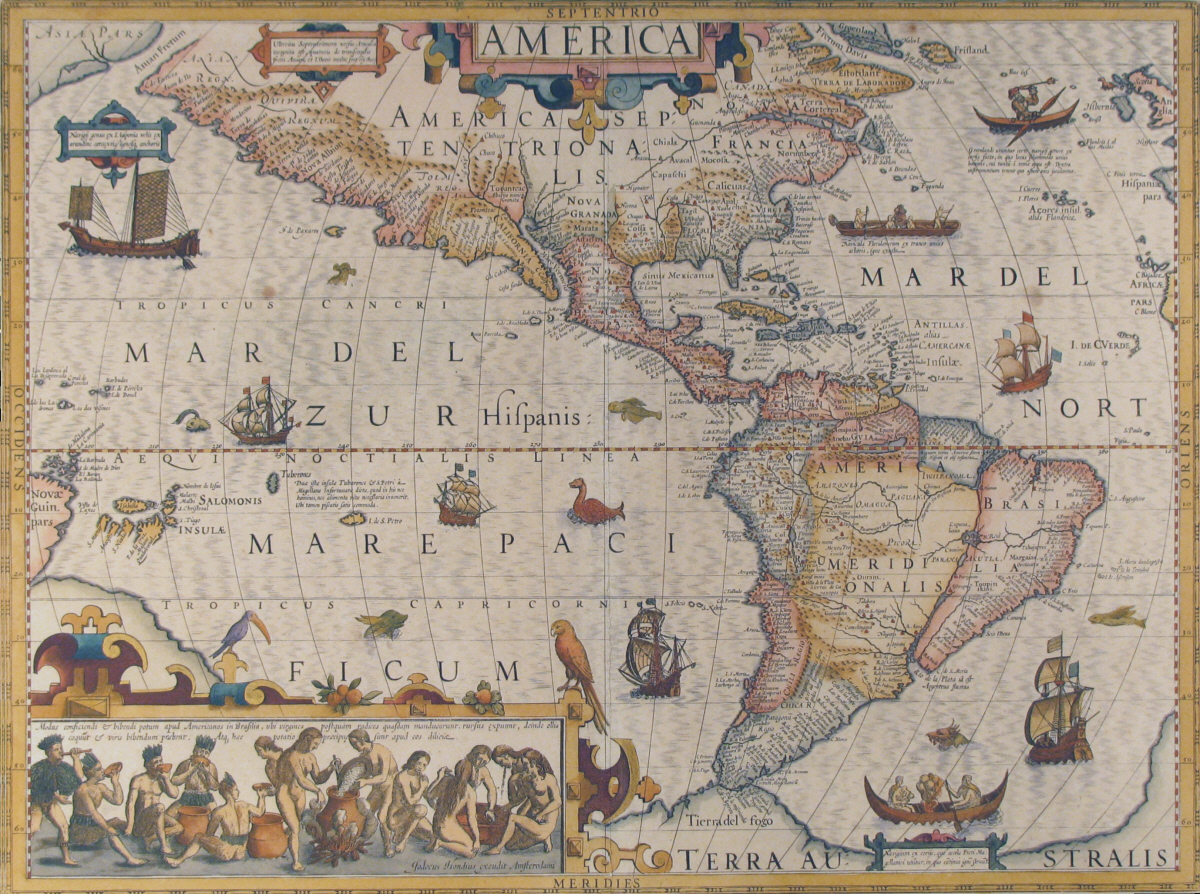
The Americas in the reign of James VI, 1619

After the Union of the Crowns of Scotland and England in 1603, King James VI, a Scot, promoted joint expeditions overseas, and became the founder of British America. The first permanent English settlement in the Americas, Jamestown, was thus named for a Scot.

The earliest Scottish communities in America were formed by traders and planters rather than farmer settlers. The hub of Scottish commercial activity in the colonial period was Virginia. Regular contacts began with the transportation of indentured servants to the colony from Scotland, including prisoners taken in the Wars of the Three Kingdoms.

By the 1670s Glasgow was the main outlet for Virginian tobacco, in open defiance of English restrictions on colonial trade; in return the colony received Scottish manufactured goods, emigrants and ideas. In the 1670s and 1680s Presbyterian Dissenters fled persecution by the Royalist privy council in Edinburgh to settle in South Carolina and New Jersey, where they maintained their distinctive religious culture.

Trade between Scotland and the American colonies was finally regularized by the Acts of Union 1707 that combined Scotland and England into the single kingdom of Great Britain. Population growth and the commercialization of agriculture in Scotland encouraged mass emigration to America after the French and Indian War, a conflict which had also seen the first use of Scottish Highland regiments as Indian fighters.

More than 50,000 Scots, principally from the west coast, settled in the Thirteen Colonies between 1763 and 1776, the majority of these in their own communities in the South, especially North Carolina, although Scottish individuals and families also began to appear as professionals and artisans in every American town. Scots arriving in Florida and the Gulf Coast traded extensively with Native Americans.

=== Settlers ===
Highland Scots started arriving in North America in the 1730s. Unlike their Lowland and Ulster counterparts, the Highlanders tended to cluster together in self-contained communities, where they maintained their distinctive cultural features such as the Gaelic language and piobaireachd music. Groups of Highlanders existed in coastal Georgia (mainly immigrants from Inverness-shire) and the Mohawk Valley in New York (from the West Highlands). By far the largest Highland community was centered on the Cape Fear River, which saw a stream of immigrants from Argyllshire, and, later, other regions such as the Isle of Skye. Highland Scots were overwhelmingly loyalist in the Revolution. Distinctly Highland cultural traits persisted in the region until the 19th century, at which point they were assimilated into Anglo-American culture. Commerce with Native American tribes was common, and interactions between Highland men and Native American women varied from brief meetings to long-lasting partnerships. Marriages between Highlanders and Native Americans occurred throughout North America, resulting in whole Scots-Indian families from these unions.

The Ulster Scots, known as the Scots-Irish (or Scotch-Irish) in North America, were descended from people originally from (mainly Lowland) Scotland, as well as the north of England and other regions, who colonized the province of Ulster in Ireland in the seventeenth century. After several generations, their descendants left for America, and struck out for the frontier, in particular the Appalachian mountains, providing an effective "buffer" for attacks from Native Americans. In the colonial era, they were usually simply referred to as "Irish," with the "Scots-" or "Scotch-" prefixes becoming popular when the descendants of the Ulster emigrants wanted to differentiate themselves from the Catholic Irish who were flocking to many American cities in the nineteenth century. Unlike the Highlanders and Lowlanders, the Scots-Irish were usually patriots in the Revolution. They have been noted for their tenacity and their cultural contributions to the United States.

=== Folk and gospel music ===
American bluegrass and country music styles have some of their roots in the Appalachian ballad culture of Scotch-Irish Americans (predominantly originating from the "Border Ballad" tradition of southern Scotland and northern England). Fiddle tunes from the Scottish repertoire, as they developed in the eighteenth century, spread rapidly into British colonies. However, in many cases, this occurred through the medium of print rather than aurally, explaining the presence of Highland-origin tunes in regions like Appalachia where there was essentially no Highland settlement. Outside of Gaelic-speaking communities, however, characteristic Highland musical idioms, such as the "Scotch-snap", were flattened out and assimilated into anglophone musical styles.

Some African American communities were influenced musically by the Scottish American communities in which they were embedded. Psalm-singing and gospel music have become central musical experiences for African American churchgoers and it has been posited that some elements of these styles were introduced, in these communities, by Scots. Psalm-singing, or "precenting the line" as it is technically known, in which the psalms are called out and the congregation sings a response, was a form of musical worship initially developed for non-literate congregations and Africans in America were exposed to this by Scottish Gaelic settlers as well as immigrants of other origins. However, the theory that the African-American practice was influenced mainly by the Gaels has been criticized by ethnomusicologist Terry Miller, who notes that the practice of "lining out" hymns and psalms was common all over Protestant Britain in the seventeenth and eighteenth centuries, and that it is far more likely that Gospel music originated with English psalm singing.

The first foreign tongue spoken by some slaves in America was Scottish Gaelic picked up from Gaelic-speaking immigrants from the Scottish Highlands and Western Isles. There are accounts of African Americans singing Gaelic songs and playing Scottish Gaelic music on bagpipes and fiddle.

=== Patriots and Loyalists ===
The civic tradition of the Scottish Enlightenment contributed to the intellectual ferment of the American Revolution. In 1740, the Glasgow philosopher Francis Hutcheson argued for a right of colonial resistance to tyranny. Scotland's leading thinkers of the revolutionary age, David Hume and Adam Smith, opposed the use of force against the rebellious colonies. According to the historian Arthur L. Herman: "Americans built their world around the principles of Adam Smith and Thomas Reid, of individual interest governed by common sense and a limited need for government."

John Witherspoon and James Wilson were the two Scots to sign the Declaration of Independence, and several other signers had ancestors there. Other Founding Father like James Madison had no ancestral connection but were imbued with ideas drawn from Scottish moral philosophy. Scottish Americans who made major contributions to the revolutionary war included Commodore John Paul Jones, the "Father of the American Navy", and Generals Henry Knox and William Alexander. Another person of note was a personal friend of George Washington, General Hugh Mercer, who fought for Charles Edward Stuart at the Battle of Culloden.

The Scotch-Irish, who had already begun to settle beyond the Proclamation Line in the Ohio and Tennessee Valleys, were drawn into rebellion as war spread to the frontier. Tobacco plantations and independent farms in the backcountry of Virginia, Maryland and the Carolinas had been financed with Scottish credit, and indebtedness was an additional incentive for separation.

Most Scottish Americans had commercial ties with the old country or clan allegiances and stayed true to the Crown. The Scottish Highland communities of upstate New York and the Cape Fear valley of North Carolina were centers of Loyalist resistance. A small force of Loyalist Highlanders fell at the Battle of Moore's Creek Bridge in 1776. Scotch-Irish Patriots defeated Scottish American Loyalists in the Battle of Kings Mountain in 1780. Many Scottish American Loyalists, particularly Highlanders, emigrated to Canada after the war.

=== Uncle Sam ===
"Uncle Sam" Wilson was based on Samuel Wilson.

Uncle Sam is the national personification of the United States, and sometimes more specifically of the American government, with the first usage of the term dating from the War of 1812. The American icon Uncle Sam, who is known for embodying the American spirit, was based on a businessman from Troy, New York, Samuel Wilson, whose parents sailed to America from Greenock, Scotland, has been officially recognized as the original Uncle Sam. He provided the army with beef and pork in barrels during the War of 1812. The barrels were prominently labeled "U.S." for the United States, but it was jokingly said that the letters stood for "Uncle Sam." Soon, Uncle Sam was used as shorthand for the federal government.

=== Emigrants and free traders ===
Trade with Scotland continued to flourish after U.S. independence. The tobacco trade was overtaken in the nineteenth century by the cotton trade, with Glasgow factories exporting the finished textiles back to the United States on an industrial scale.

Emigration from Scotland peaked in the nineteenth century, when more than a million Scots left for the United States, taking advantage of the regular Atlantic steam-age shipping industry which was itself largely a Scottish creation, contributing to a revolution in transatlantic communication.

Scottish emigration to the United States followed, to a lesser extent, during the twentieth century, when Scottish heavy industry declined. This new wave peaked in the first decade of the twentieth century, contributing to a hard life for many who remained behind. Many qualified workers emigrated overseas, a part of which, established in Canada, later went on to the United States.

=== Writers ===
In the nineteenth century, American authors and educators adopted Scotland as a model for cultural independence. In the world of letters, Scottish literary icons James Macpherson, Robert Burns, Walter Scott, and Thomas Carlyle had a mass following in the United States, and Scottish Romanticism exerted a seminal influence on the development of American literature. The works of Ralph Waldo Emerson and Nathaniel Hawthorne bear its powerful impression. Among the most notable Scottish American writers of the nineteenth century were Washington Irving, James Fenimore Cooper, Edgar Allan Poe and Herman Melville. Poet James Mackintosh Kennedy was called to Scotland to deliver the official poem for the 600th anniversary of the Battle of Bannockburn in 1914.

In the twentieth century, Margaret Mitchell's Gone With the Wind exemplified popular literature. William Faulkner won the Nobel Prize for Literature in 1949.

There have been a number of notable Scottish Gaelic poets active in the United States since the eighteenth century, including Aonghas MacAoidh and Domhnall Aonghas Stiùbhart. One of the few relics of Gaelic literature composed in the United States is a lullaby composed by an anonymous woman in the Carolinas during the American Revolutionary War. It remains popular to this day in Scotland.

=== Soldiers and statesmen ===
More than 160,000 Scottish emigrants migrated to the U.S., American statesmen of Scottish descent in the early Republic included Secretary of the Treasury Alexander Hamilton, Secretary of War Henry Knox, and President James Monroe. Andrew Jackson and James K. Polk were Scotch-Irish presidents and products of the frontier in the period of Westward expansion. Among the most famous Scottish American soldier frontiersmen was Sam Houston, founding father of Texas.

Other Scotch-Irish presidents included James Buchanan, Chester Alan Arthur, William McKinley and Richard M. Nixon, Theodore Roosevelt (through his mother), Woodrow Wilson, Lyndon B. Johnson, and Ronald Reagan were of Scottish descent. By one estimate, 75% of U.S. presidents could claim some Scottish ancestry.

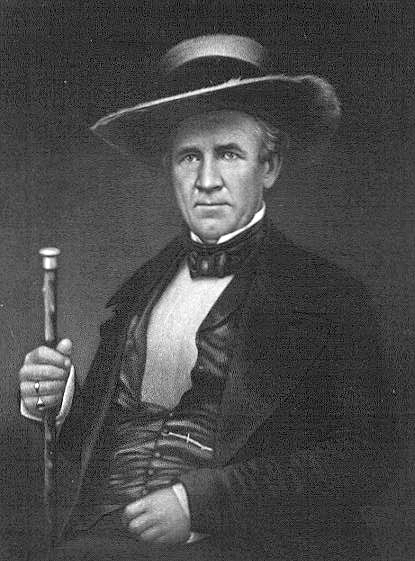
Sam Houston was Scotch-Irish (Ulster Scots) descent, and namesake for the city of Houston, Texas.

Scottish Americans fought on both sides of the Civil War, and a monument to their memory was erected in Edinburgh, Scotland, in 1893. Winfield Scott, Ulysses S. Grant, Joseph E. Johnston, Irvin McDowell, James B. McPherson, Jeb Stuart and John B. Gordon were of Scottish descent, George B. McClellan and Stonewall Jackson Scotch-Irish.

Douglas MacArthur and George Marshall upheld the martial tradition in the twentieth century. Grace Murray Hopper, a rear admiral and computer scientist, was the oldest officer and highest-ranking woman in the U.S. armed forces on her retirement at the age of 80 in 1986. Isabella Cannon, the former Mayor of Raleigh, North Carolina, served as the first female mayor of a U.S. state capital.

=== Automakers ===
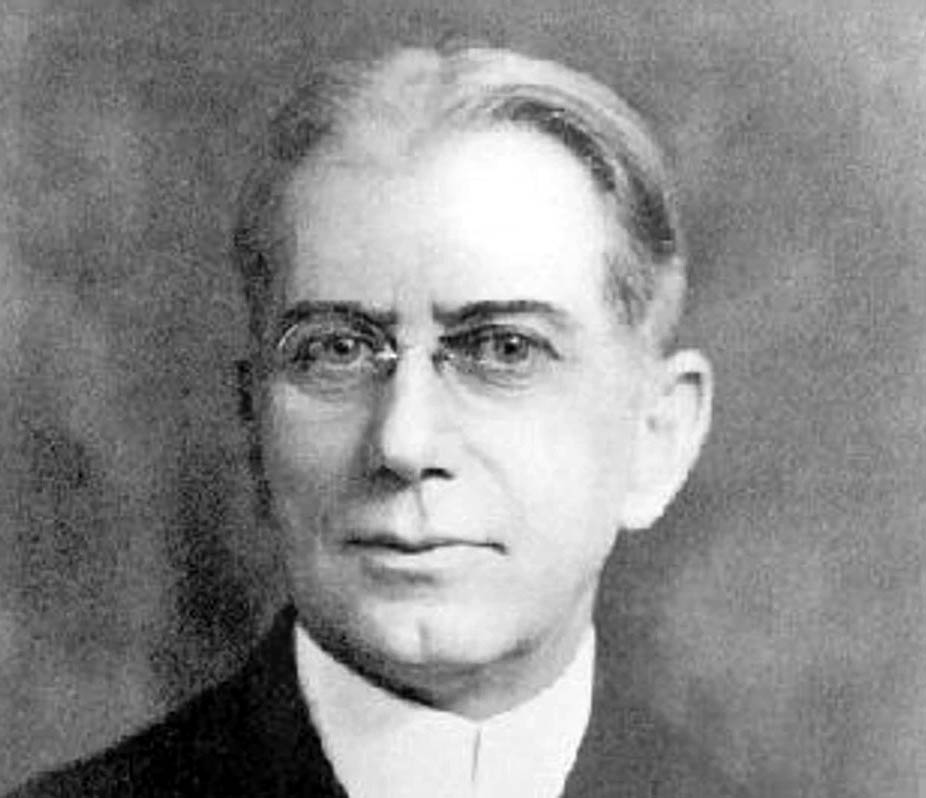
David Buick, founder of the Buick Motor Company.

The Scottish-born Alexander Winton built one of the first American automobiles in 1896, and specialized in motor racing. He broke the world speed record in 1900. In 1903, he became the first man to drive across the United States. David Dunbar Buick, another Scottish emigrant, founded Buick in 1903. The Scottish-born William Blackie transformed the Caterpillar Tractor Company into a multinational corporation.

=== Motorcycle manufacturer ===
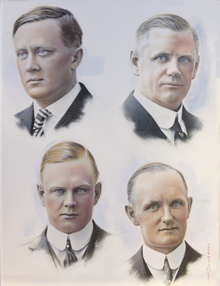
Clockwise top left: William S. Harley, William A. Davidson, Walter Davidson Sr., Arthur Davidson

Harley-Davidson Inc (formerly HDI), often abbreviated "H-D" or "Harley", is an American motorcycle manufacturer. The Davidson brothers were the sons of William C Davidson (1846–1923) who was born and grew up in Angus, Scotland, and Margaret Adams McFarlane (1843–1933) of Scottish descent from the small Scottish settlement of Cambridge, Wisconsin. They raised five children together: Janet May, William A., Walter, Arthur and Elizabeth.

=== Aviation ===
Scottish Americans have made a major contribution to the U.S. aircraft industry. Alexander Graham Bell, in partnership with Samuel Pierpont Langley, built the first machine capable of flight, the Bell-Langley airplane, in 1903. Lockheed was started by two brothers, Allan and Malcolm Loughead, in 1926. Douglas was founded by Donald Wills Douglas Sr. in 1921; he launched the world's first commercial passenger plane, the DC-3, in 1935. McDonnell Aircraft was founded by James Smith McDonnell, in 1939, and became famous for its military jets. In 1967, McDonnell and Douglas merged and jointly developed jet aircraft, missiles and spacecraft.

=== Spaceflight ===
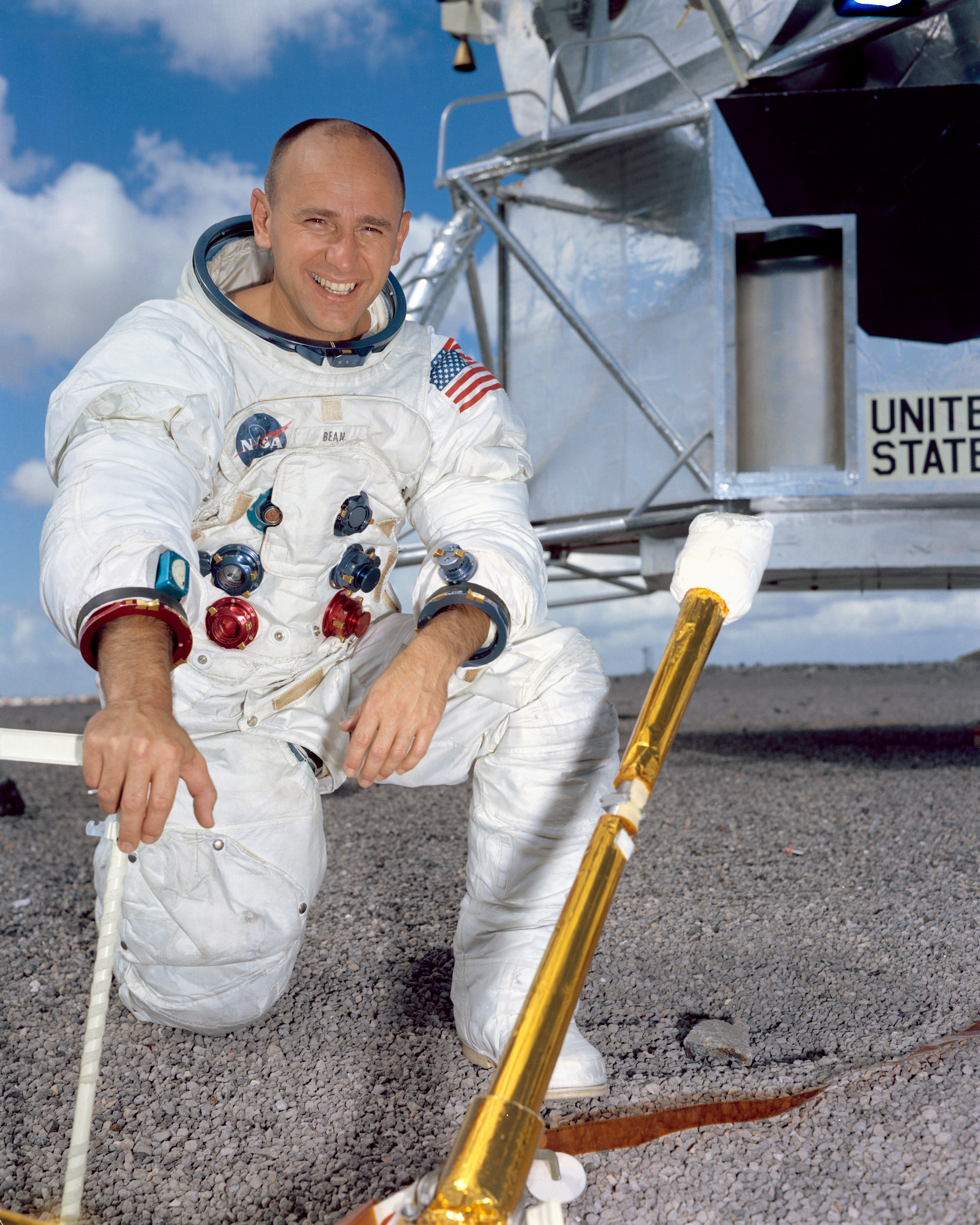
In recognition of his Scottish origins, Alan Bean carried Clan McBean tartan with him to the Moon.

Scottish Americans were pioneers in human spaceflight. The Mercury and Gemini capsules were built by McDonnell. The first American in space, Alan Shepard, the first American in orbit, John Glenn, and the first man to fly free in space, Bruce McCandless II, were Scottish Americans.

The first men on the Moon, Neil Armstrong and Buzz Aldrin, were also of Scottish descent; Armstrong wore a kilt in a parade through his ancestral home of Langholm in Dumfriesshire in 1972. Armstrong's ancestry can be traced back to his eighth paternal great-grandfather Adam Armstrong from the Scottish Borders. His son Adam II and grandson Adam Abraham (b. Cumberland, England) left for the colonies in the 1730s settling in Pennsylvania.

Other Scottish American moonwalkers were the fourth, Alan Bean, the fifth, Alan Shepard, the seventh, David Scott (also the first to drive on the Moon), and the eighth, James Irwin.

=== Computing ===
Scottish American Grace Murray Hopper created the first automatic sequence computer in 1939. Hopper was also the co-inventor of the computer language COBOL.

Ross Perot, another Scottish American entrepreneur, made his fortune from Electronic Data Systems, an outsourcing company he established in 1962.

Software giant Microsoft was co-founded in 1975 by Bill Gates, who owed his start in part to his mother, the Scottish American businesswoman Mary Maxwell Gates, who helped her son to get his first software contract with IBM. Glasgow-born Microsoft employee Richard Tait helped develop the Encarta encyclopedia and co-created the popular board game Cranium.

=== Cuisine ===
Scottish Americans have helped to define the modern American diet by introducing many distinctive foods. Oatmeal has been included in American breakfast menus since colonial times. While it is not typically consumed as a symbol of Scottish identity, it is considered a classic Scottish American food, often packaged with images of Scottish warriors wearing kilts. It is advertised as promoting strong bodies and minds. Traditional Scottish hearty broths have been adapted in the United States into "Scotch broth," usually a soup made with barley, lamb, and various vegetables, often root vegetables chosen by the cook. Scottish shortbread, a type of buttery cookie, is also popular and commonly sold in tins or packages featuring iconic Scottish designs like tartans, bagpipes, or bagpipers in kilts in the U.S. Whiskey has largely lost its association with Scotland, likely due to the strict prohibitions among Scots Presbyterians against drunkenness and excessive indulgence.

Philip Danforth Armour founded Armour Meats in 1867, revolutionizing the American meatpacking industry and becoming famous for hot dogs. Campbell Soups was founded in 1869 by Joseph A. Campbell and rapidly grew into a major manufacturer of canned soups. W. K. Kellogg transformed American eating habits from 1906 by popularizing breakfast cereal. Glen Bell, founder of Taco Bell in 1962, introduced Tex-Mex food to a mainstream audience. Marketing executive Arch West, born to Scottish emigrant parents, developed Doritos.

Scottish immigrants introduced fried chicken to the United States.

== Community activities ==
Some of the following aspects of Scottish culture can still be found in some parts of the United States.

- Bagpiping and pipe bands
- Burns Supper
- Ceilidhs
- Hogmanay, the Scottish New Year
- St. Andrew's Day festivities
- Tartan – some places in the U.S. have their own tartan, and Scottish dress is worn by some Americans to celebrate their ancestral heritage.

=== Tartan Day ===
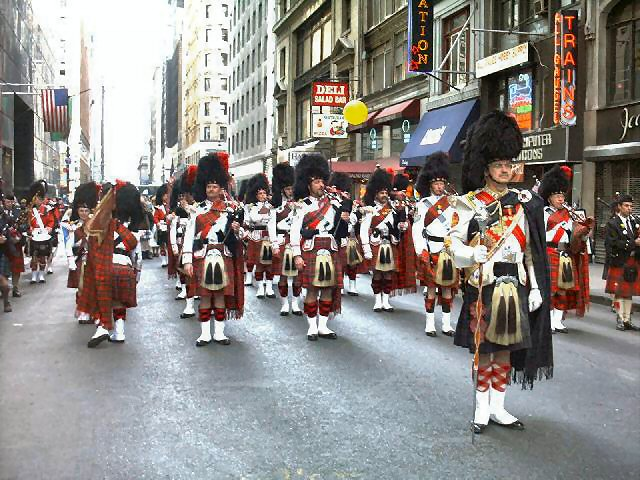
Tartan Day parade in New York City

National Tartan Day, held each year on April 6 in the United States and Canada, celebrates the historical links between Scotland and North America and the contributions Scottish Americans and Canadians have made to U.S. and Canadian democracy, industry and society. The date of April 6 was chosen as "the anniversary of the Declaration of Arbroath in 1320—the inspirational document, according to U.S. Senate Resolution 155, 1999, upon which the American Declaration of Independence was modeled".

The Annual Tartan Week celebrations come to life every April with the largest celebration taking place in New York City. Thousands descend onto the streets of the Big Apple to celebrate their heritage, culture and the impact of the Scottish Americans in America today.

Hundreds of pipers, drummers, Highland dancers, Scottie Dogs and celebrities march down the streets drowned in their family tartans and Saltire flags whilst interacting with the thousands of onlookers.

Scottish Heritage Month is also promoted by community groups around the United States and Canada.

=== Scottish Festivals ===
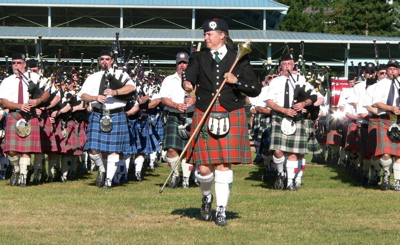
Massed bands at the 2005 Pacific Northwest Highland Games

Scottish culture, food, and athletics are celebrated at Highland Games and Scottish festivals throughout North America. The largest of these occurs yearly at Pleasanton, California, Grandfather Mountain, North Carolina and Estes Park, Colorado. There are also other notable Scottish Festivals in cities like Tulsa, Oklahoma, Ventura, California at the Seaside Highland Games, Atlanta, Georgia (at Stone Mountain Park), San Antonio, Texas and St. Louis, Missouri. In addition to traditional Scottish sports such as tossing the caber and the hammer throw, there are whisky tastings, traditional foods such as haggis, Bagpipes and Drums competitions, Celtic rock musical acts and traditional Scottish dance.

=== Scottish Gaelic language in the United States ===
Although Scottish Gaelic had been spoken in most of Scotland at one time or another, by the time of large-scale migrations to North America – the eighteenth century – it had only managed to survive in the Highlands and Western Isles of Scotland. Unlike other ethnic groups in Scotland, Scottish Highlanders preferred to migrate in communities, and remaining in larger, denser concentrations aided in the maintenance of their language and culture. The first communities of Scottish Gaels began migrating in the 1730s to Georgia, New York and the Carolinas. Only in the Carolinas were these settlements enduring. Although their numbers were small, the immigrants formed a beach-head for later migrations, which accelerated in the 1760s.

The American Revolutionary War effectively stopped direct migration to the newly formed United States, most people going instead to British North America (now Canada). The Canadian Maritimes were a favored destination from the 1770s to the 1840s. Sizable concentrations of Gaelic communities existed in Ontario, Nova Scotia, and Prince Edward Island, with smaller clusters in Newfoundland, Quebec, and New Brunswick. Those who left these communities for opportunities in the United States, especially in New England, were usually fluent Gaelic speakers into the mid-twentieth century.

Of the many communities founded by Scottish Highland immigrants, the language and culture only survives at a community level in the Canadian province of Nova Scotia. According to the 2000 census, 1,199 people speak Scottish Gaelic at home.

The direct descendants of Scottish Highlanders were not the only people in the United States to speak the language, however. Gaelic was one of the languages spoken by fur traders in many parts of North America. In some parts of the Carolinas and Alabama, African-American communities spoke Scottish Gaelic, particularly (but not solely) due to the influence of Gaelic-speaking slave-owners. According to musicologist Willie Ruff, jazz musician Dizzy Gillespie spoke often of the Gaelic speaking African-Americans.

== Notable people ==
=== Presidents of Scottish or Scotch-Irish descent ===
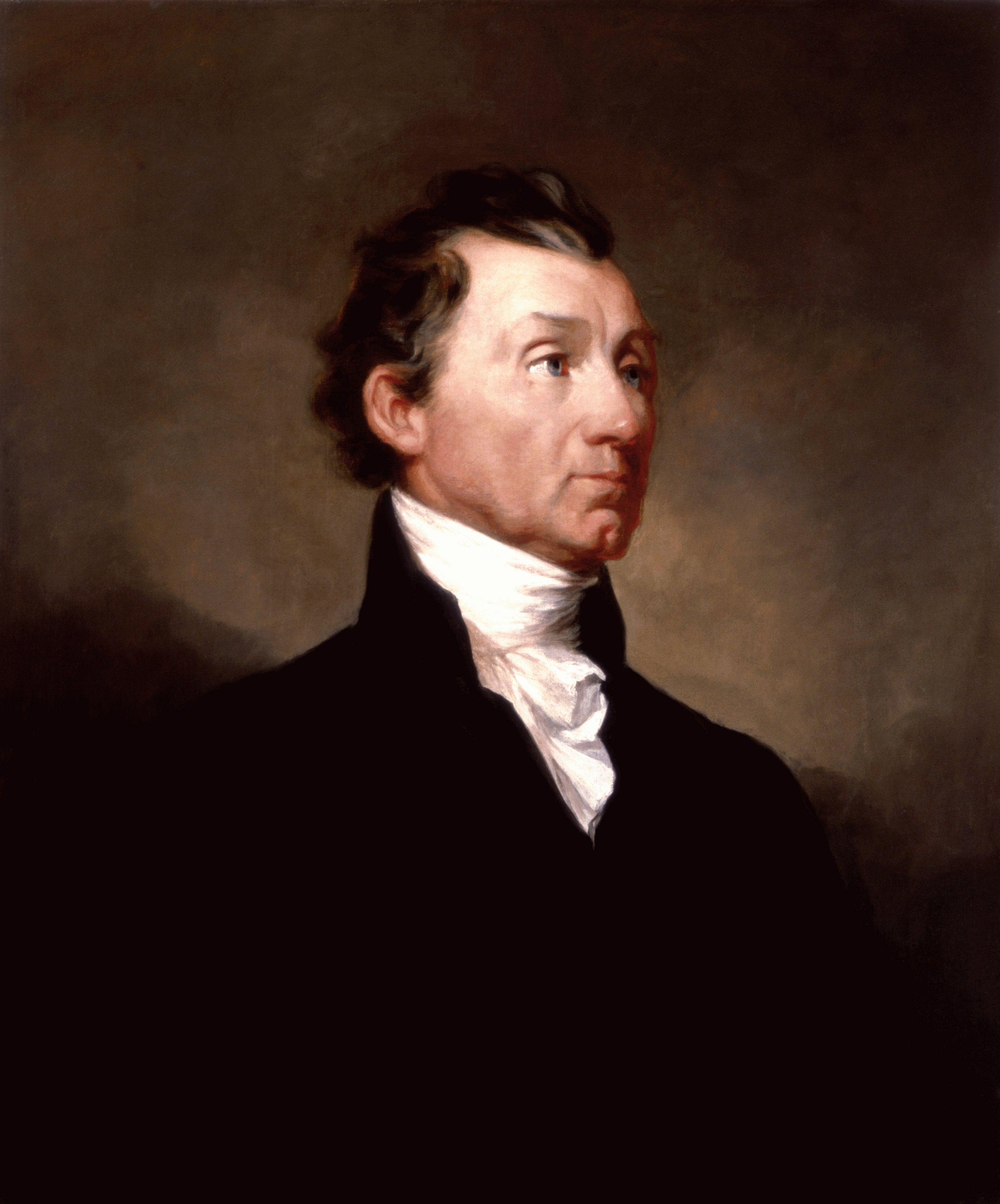
James Monroe

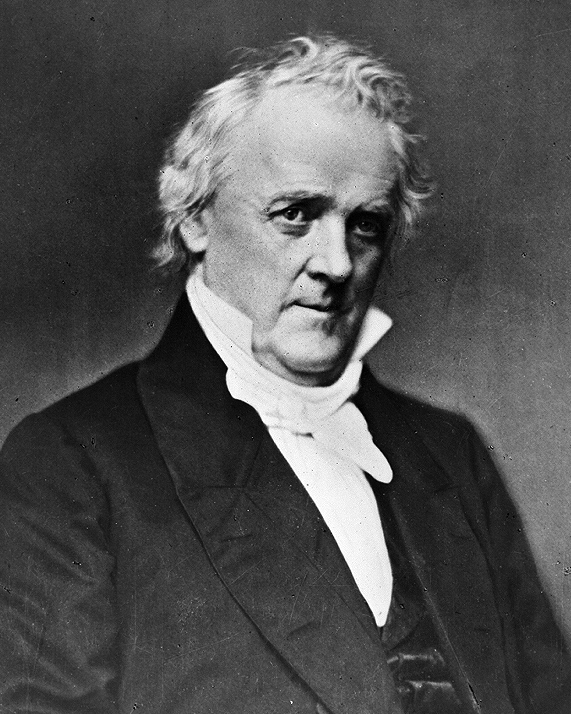
James Buchanan

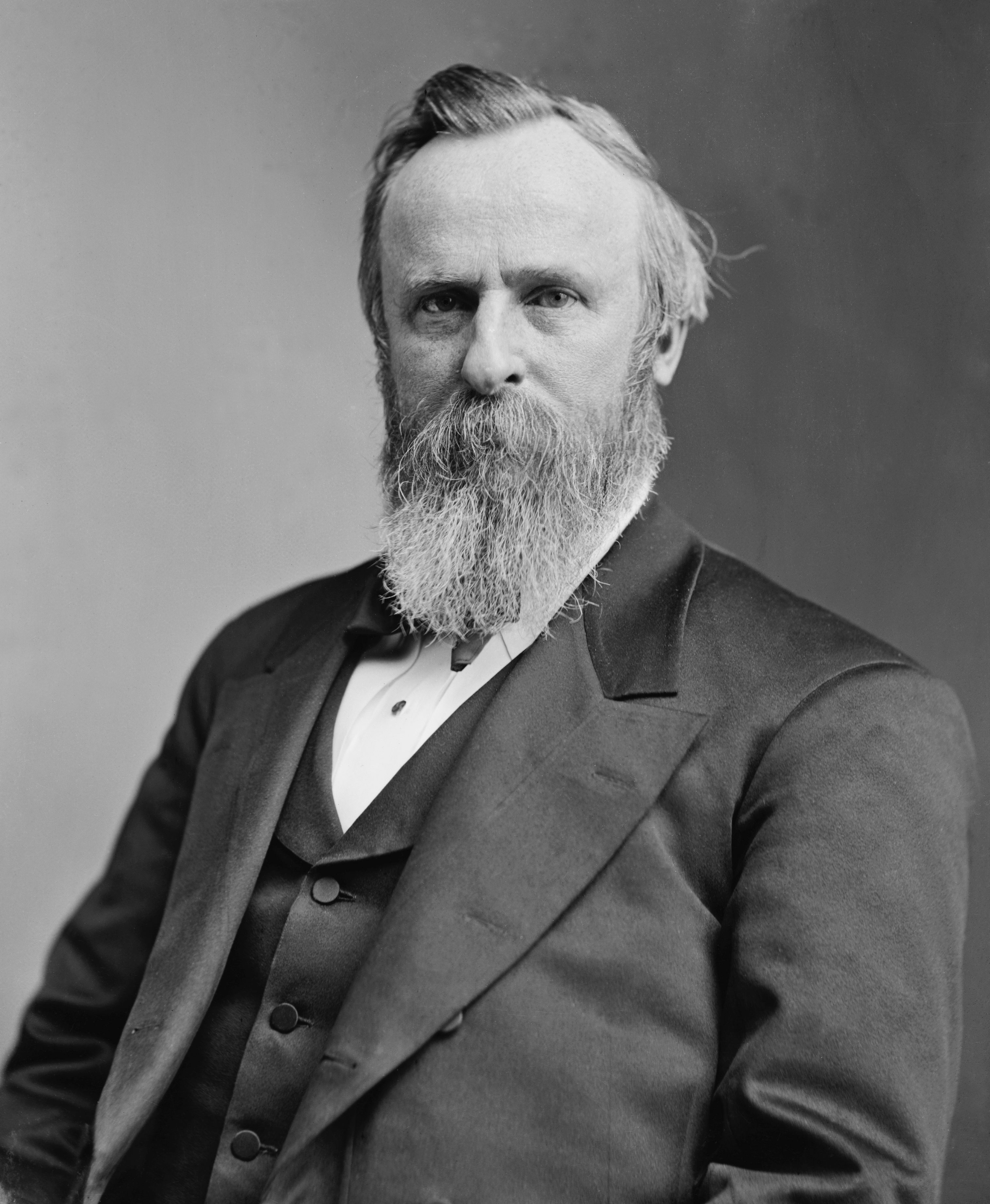
Rutherford B. Hayes

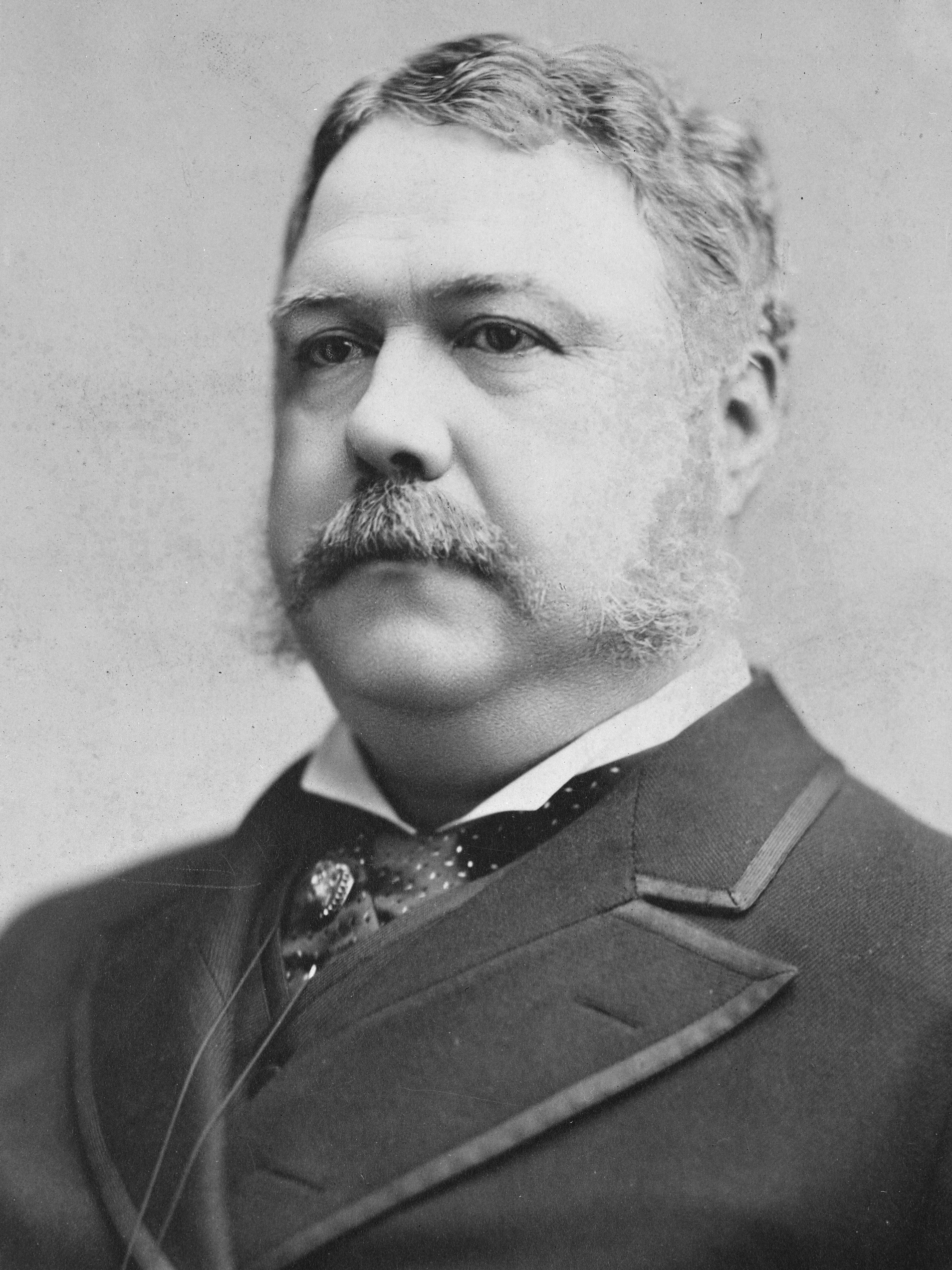
Chester A. Arthur

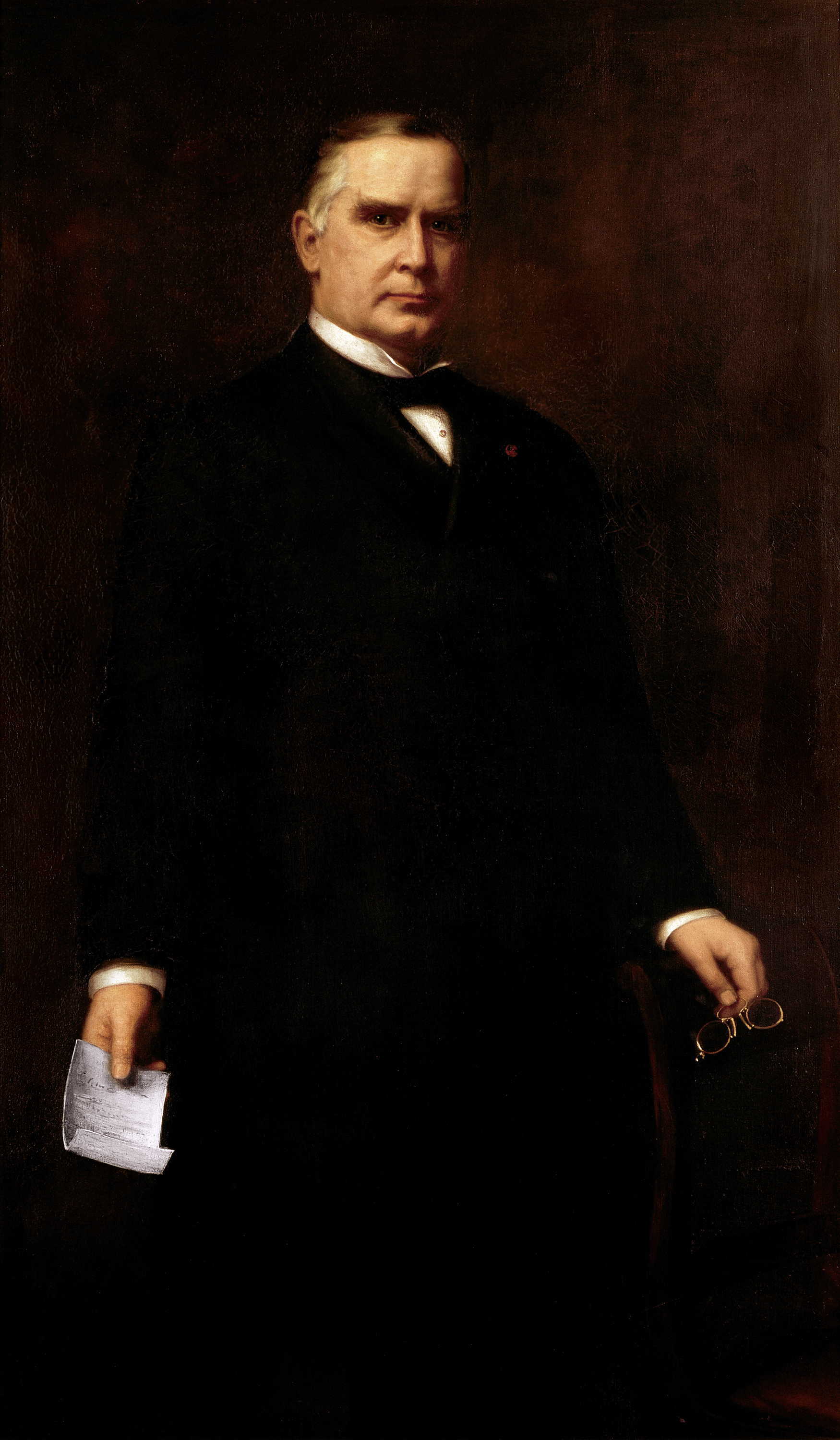
William McKinley

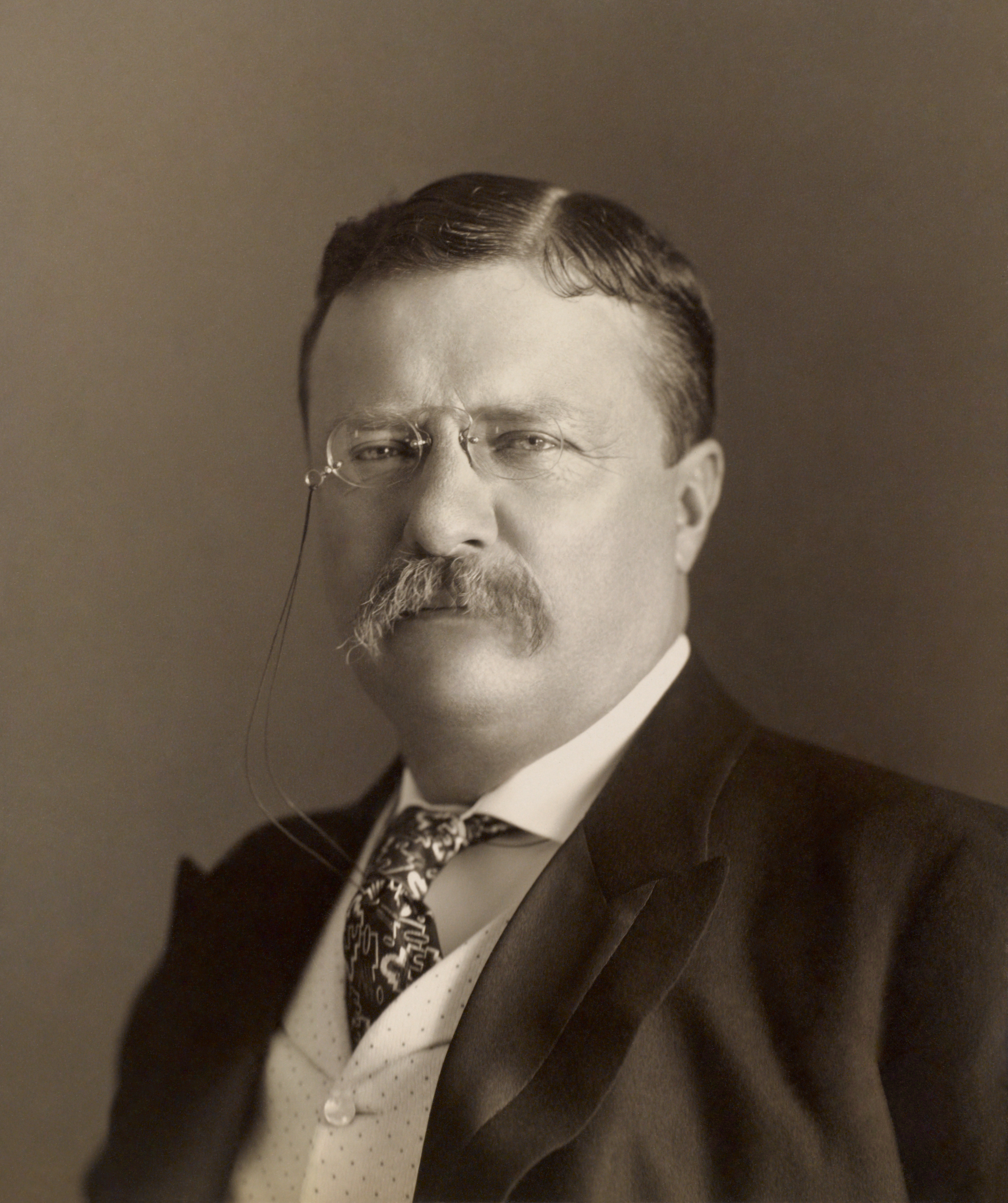
Theodore Roosevelt

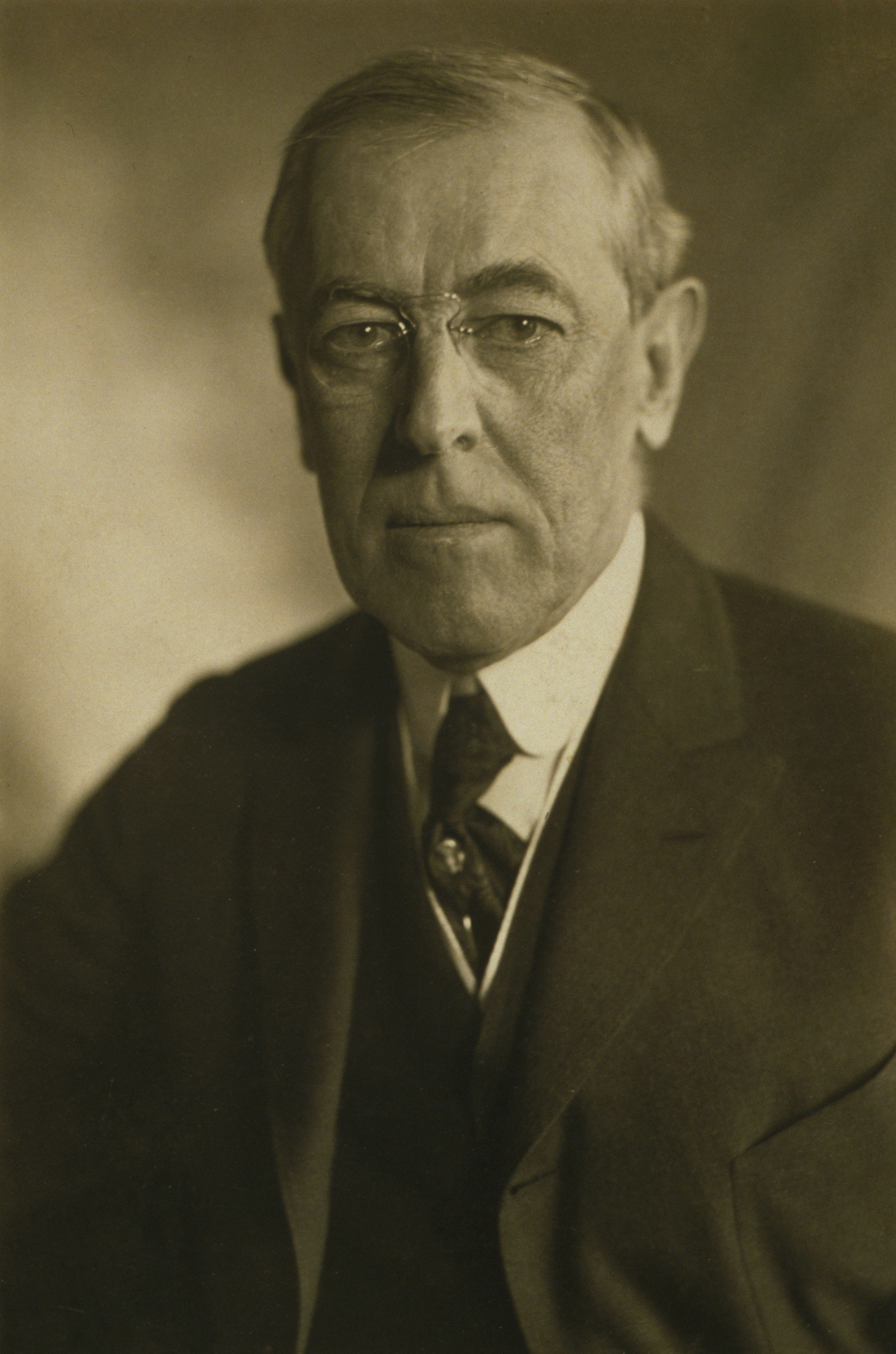
Woodrow Wilson

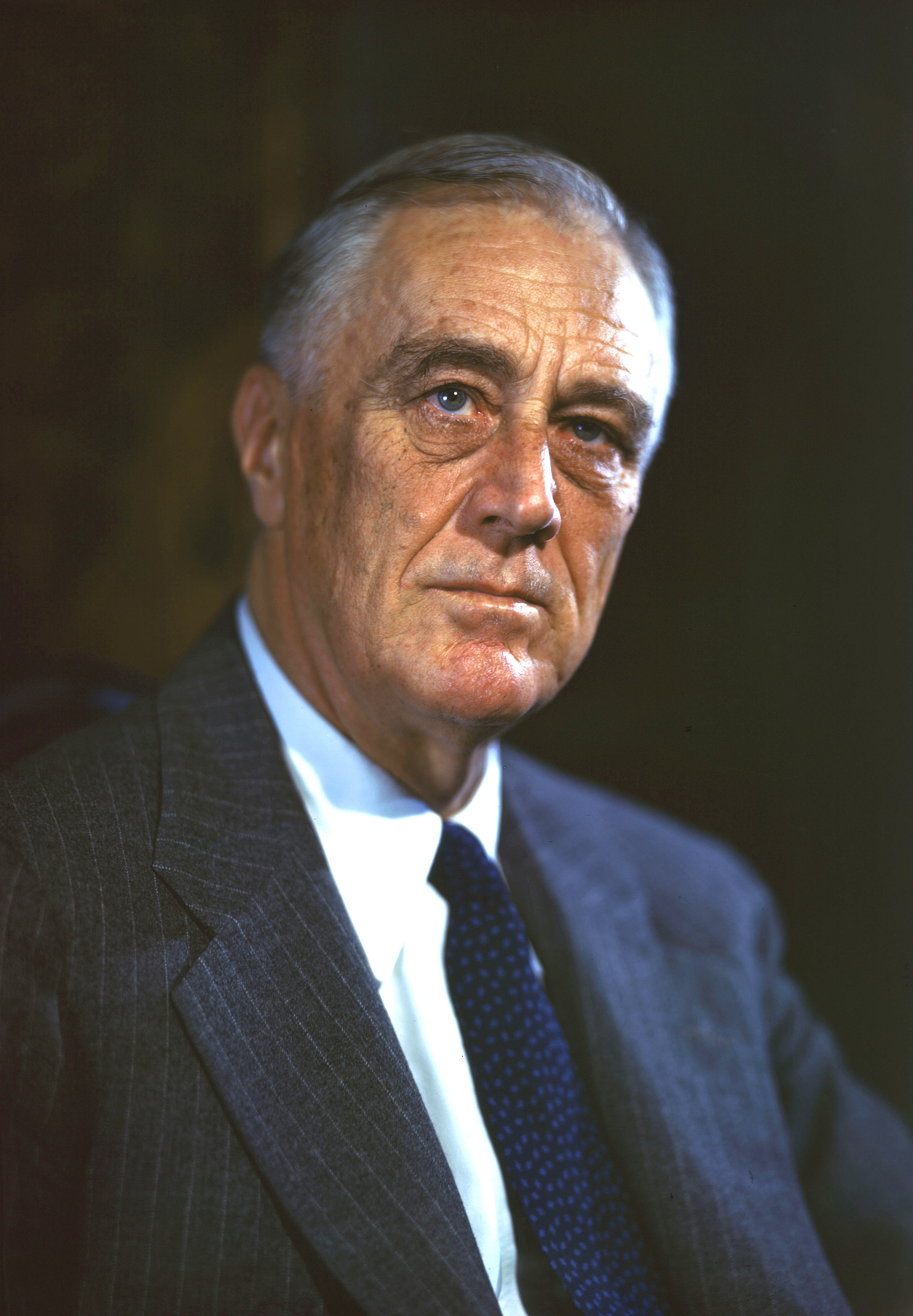
Franklin D. Roosevelt

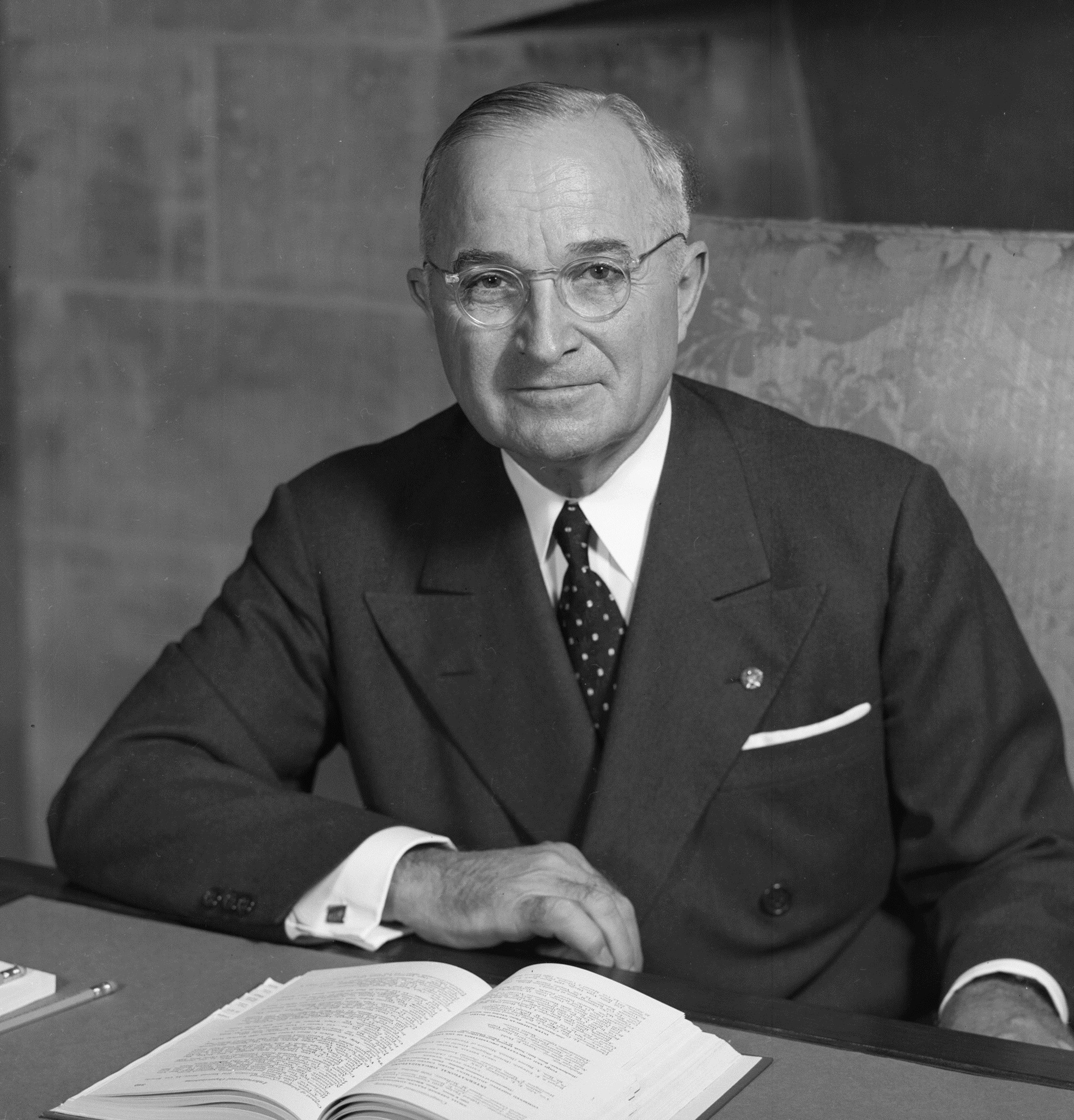
Harry S. Truman

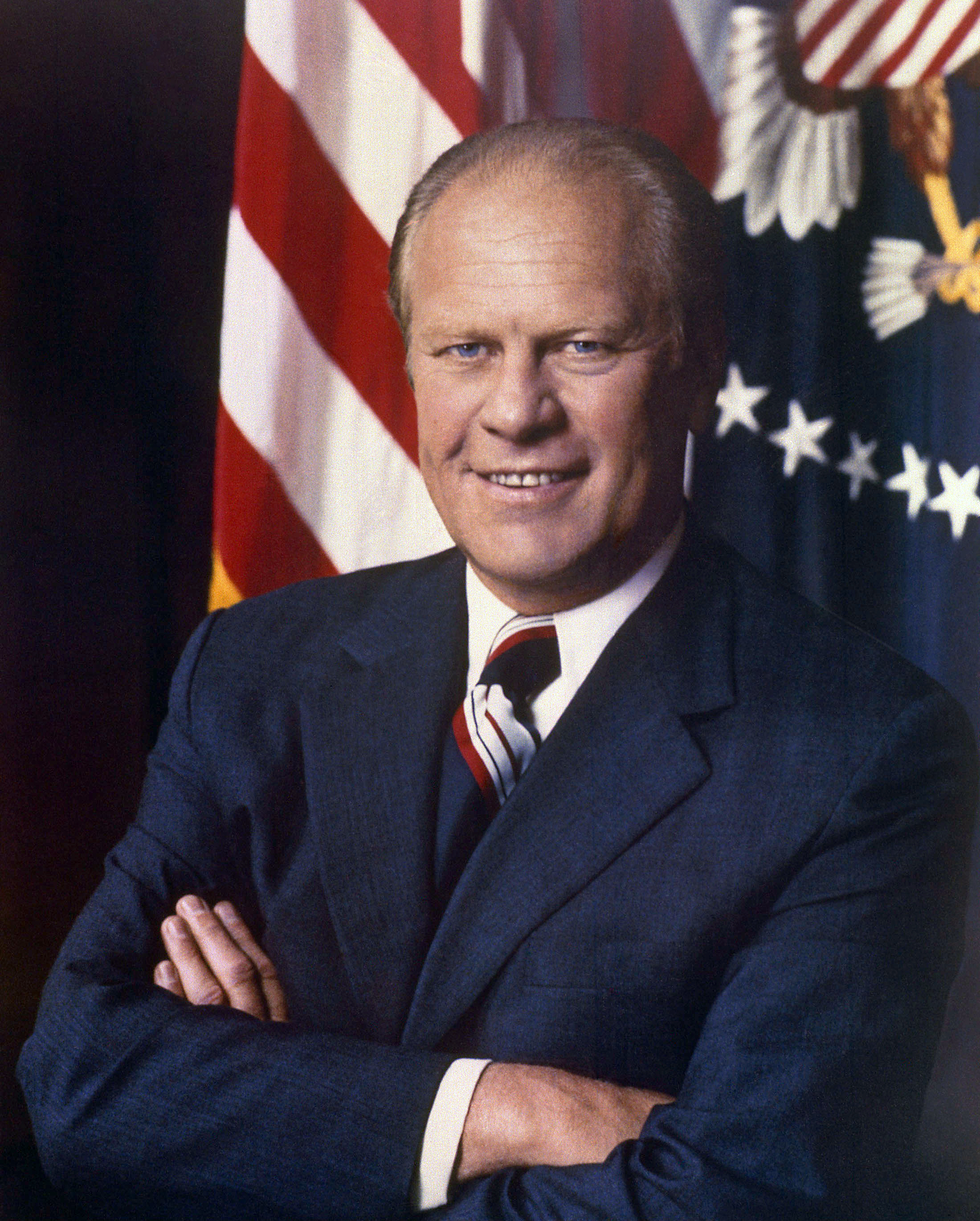
Gerald Ford

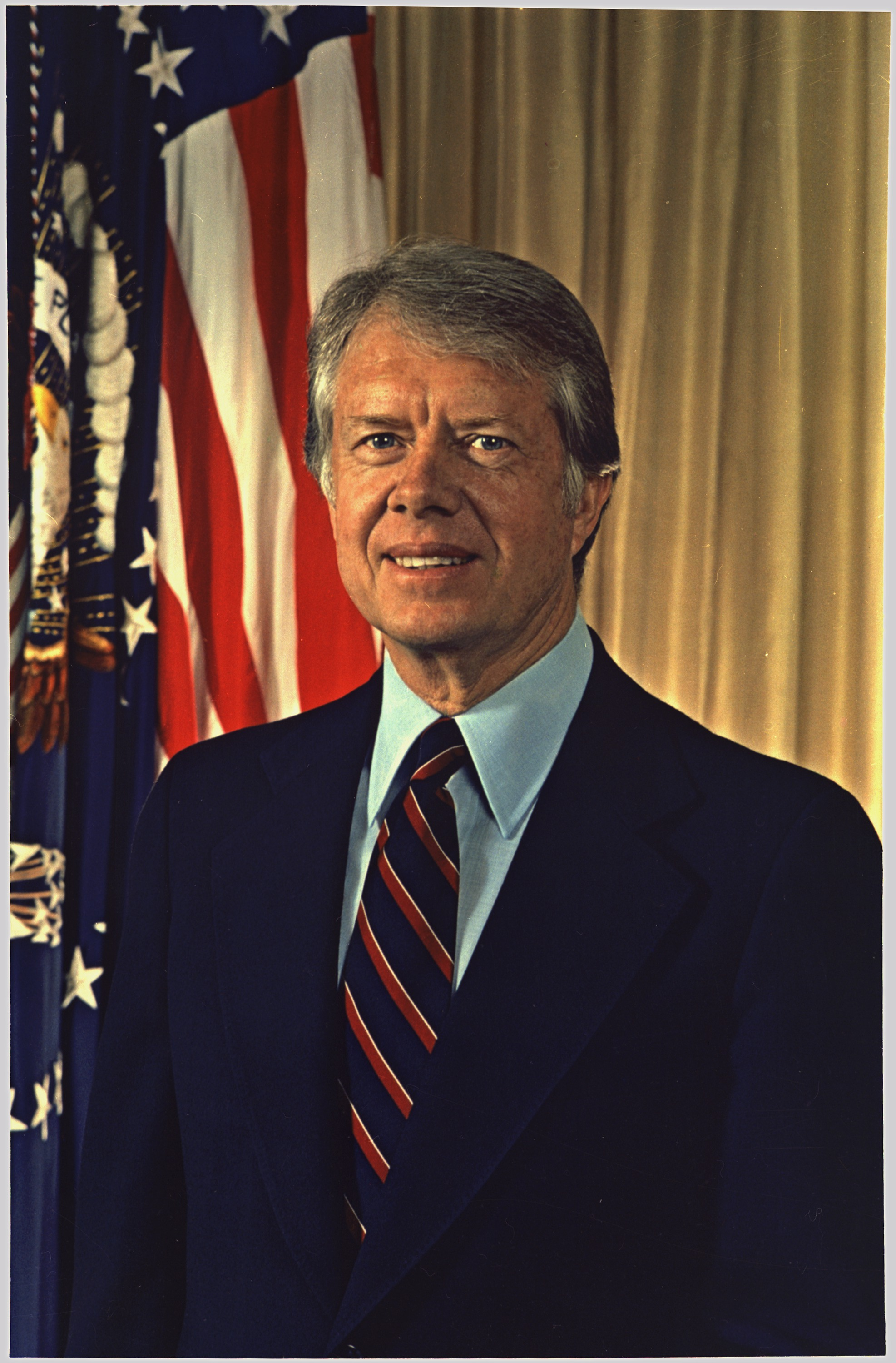
Jimmy Carter

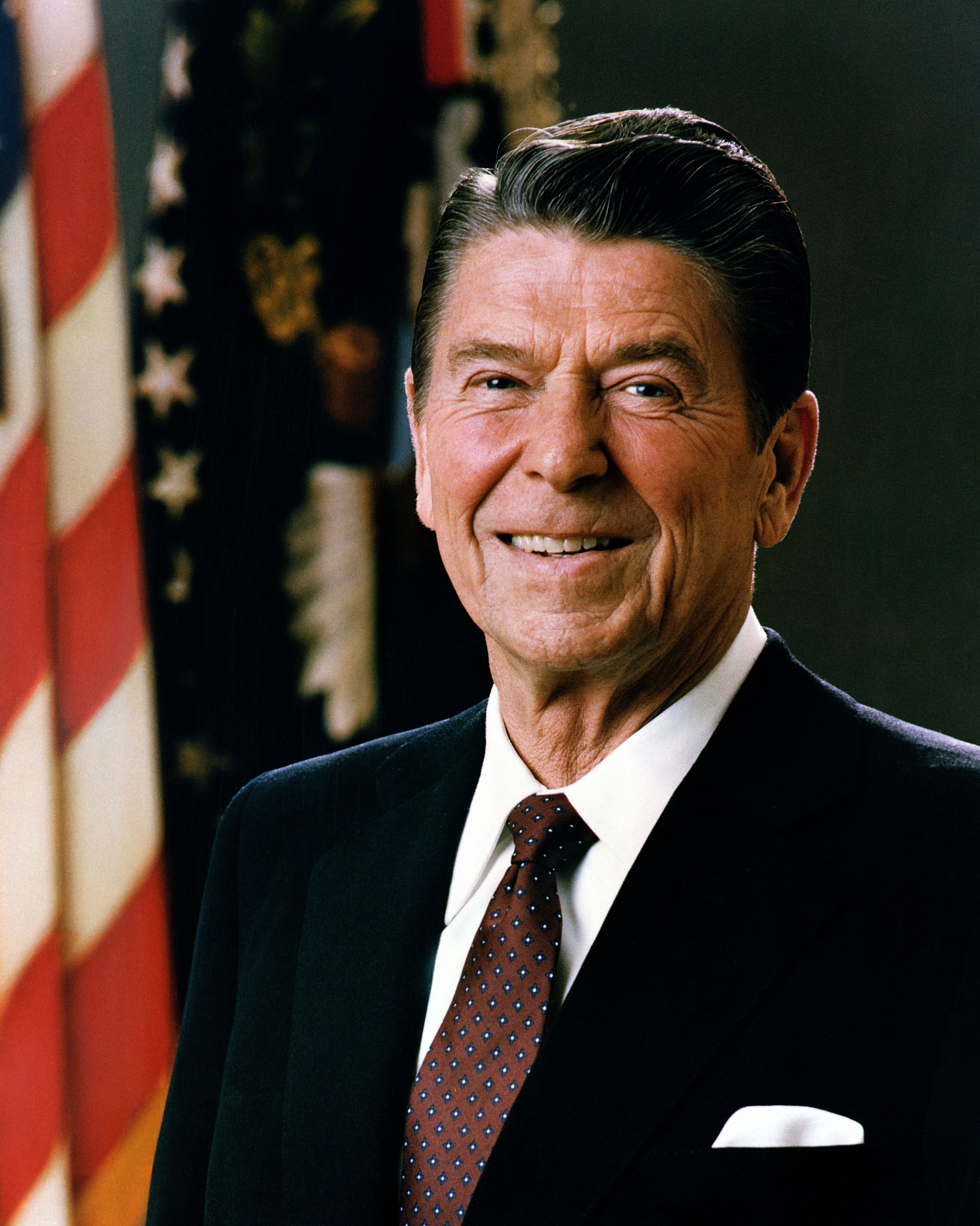
Ronald Reagan

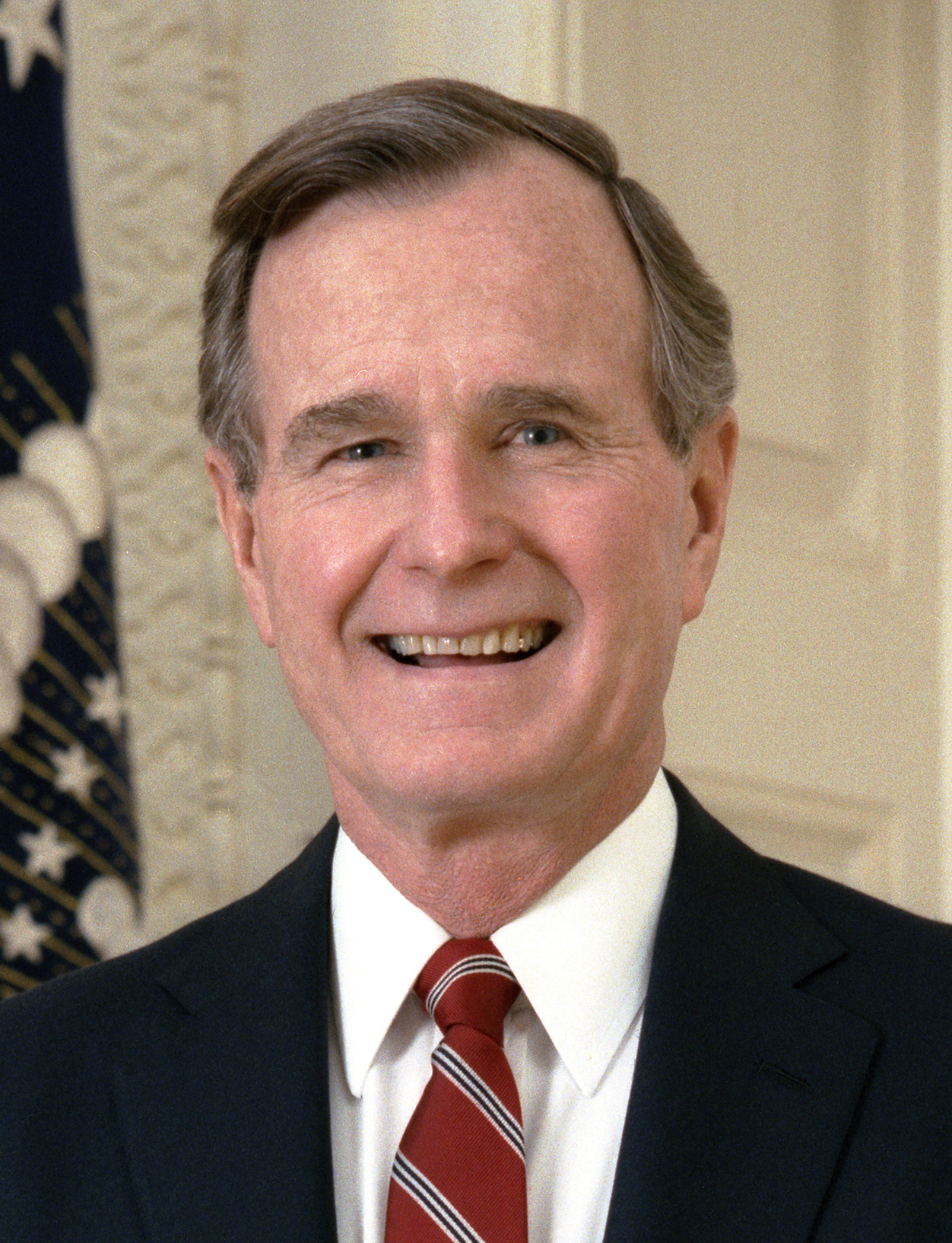
George H. W. Bush

George W. Bush

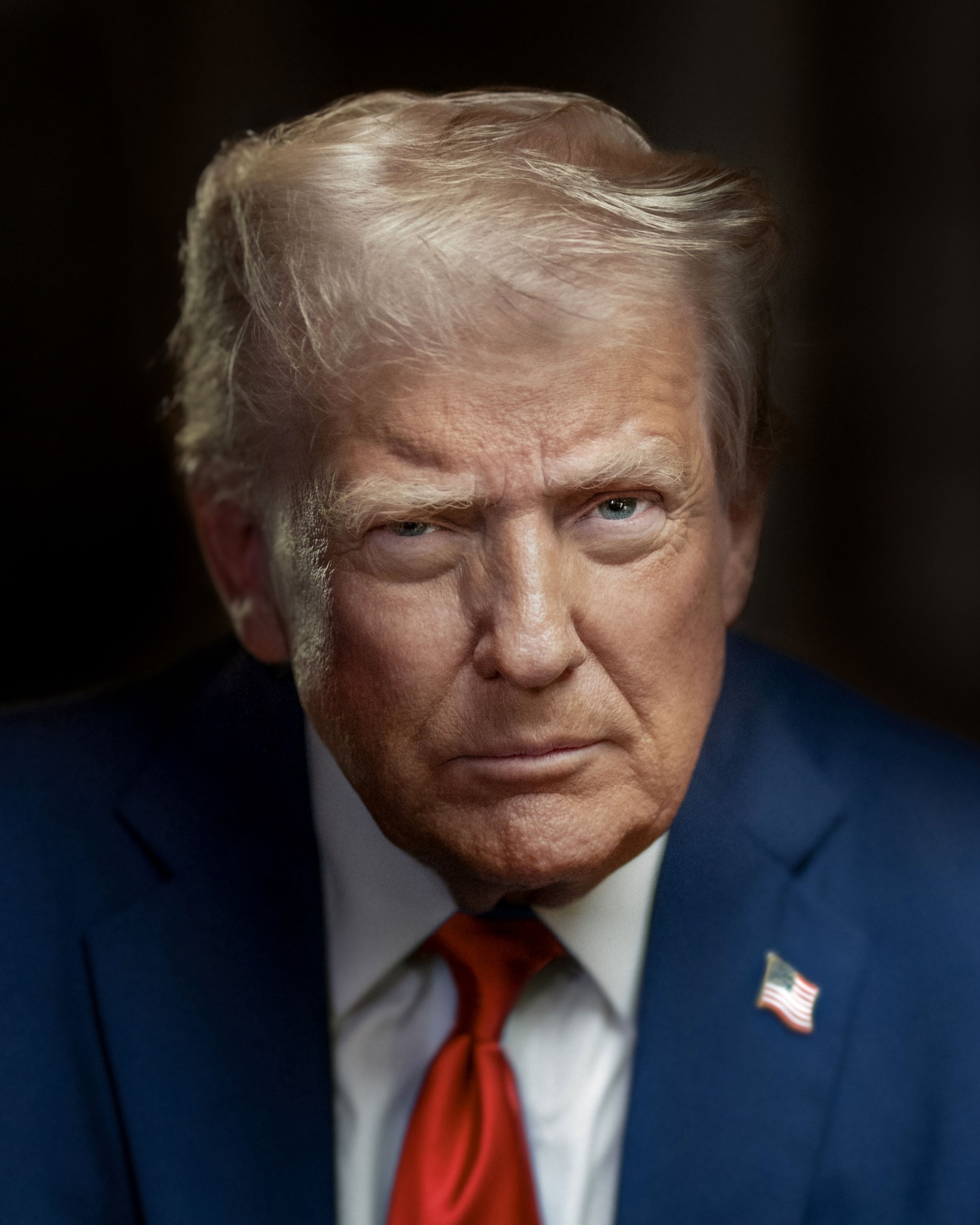
Donald Trump

Several presidents of the United States have had some Scottish or Scotch-Irish ancestry, although the extent of this varies. For example, Donald Trump's mother was Scottish and Woodrow Wilson's maternal grandparents were both Scottish. Ronald Reagan, Gerald Ford, Chester A. Arthur and William McKinley have less direct Scottish or Scotch-Irish ancestry.

James Monroe (Scottish and Welsh)
5th President, 1817–1825: His paternal great-great-grandfather, Andrew Monroe, emigrated to America from Ross-shire, Scotland in the mid–17th century.
Andrew Jackson (Scotch-Irish)
7th President, 1829–1837: He was born in the predominantly Ulster-Scots Waxhaws area of South Carolina two years after his parents left Boneybefore, near Carrickfergus in County Antrim.
James K. Polk (Scottish and Scotch-Irish)
11th President, 1845–1849: His Scottish paternal great x 5 grandfather, Robert Pollock, emigrated to Ireland in the 17th century. The family's surname was later changed from Pollock to Polk.
James Buchanan (Scottish and Scotch-Irish)
15th President, 1857–1861: His paternal great-grandmother, Katherine Blair, was born in Stirlingshire.
Andrew Johnson (Scotch-Irish and English)
17th President, 1865–1869: His grandfather left Mounthill, near Larne in County Antrim around 1750 and settled in North Carolina.
Ulysses S. Grant (Scottish, Scotch-Irish and English)
18th President, 1869–1877: His maternal great-grandfather, John Simpson, was born in Dergenagh, County Tyrone.
Rutherford B. Hayes (Scottish and English)
19th President, 1877–1881: His ancestor, George Hayes, emigrated from Scotland to Connecticut in 1680.
Chester A. Arthur (Scotch-Irish, Scottish and English)
21st President, 1881–1885: His paternal great-grandmother, Jane Campbell, emigrated from Scotland to County Antrim, Ireland.
Grover Cleveland (Scotch-Irish and English)
22nd and 24th President, 1885–1889 and 1893–1897: Born in New Jersey, he was the maternal grandson of merchant Abner Neal, who emigrated from County Antrim in the 1790s. He was the first president to have served non-consecutive terms.
Benjamin Harrison (Scottish, Scotch-Irish and English)
23rd President, 1889–1893: Through his mother, Elizabeth Irwin, his great x 5 grandfather, David Irvine, was born in Aberdeenshire, and emigrated to Ireland.
William McKinley (Scottish and Scotch-Irish)
25th President, 1897–1901: His Scottish paternal great-great-great-great-grandfather, James McKinley, settled in Ireland in 1690.
Theodore Roosevelt (Scottish, Scotch-Irish, Dutch, English, and French)
26th President, 1901–1909: His maternal great-great-great-grandmother, Jean Stobo, emigrated to America from Scotland with her parents in 1699.
William Howard Taft (Scotch-Irish and English)
27th President, 1909–1913
Woodrow Wilson (Scottish and Scotch-Irish)
28th President, 1913–1921: His Scottish maternal grandparents from Paisley, Rev. Dr. Thomas Woodrow and Marion Williamson, emigrated to America in the 1830s. Throughout his career he reflected on the influence of his ancestral values on his constant quest for knowledge and fulfillment.
Warren G. Harding (Scottish and English)
29th President, 1921–1923: His paternal great-great-grandmother, Lydia Crawford, was born in Midlothian.
Franklin D. Roosevelt (Scottish, Dutch, English and French)
32nd President, 1933–1945: His maternal great-great-great-grandparents, James Murray and Barbara Bennett, were from Dumfriesshire and Roxburghshire.
Harry S. Truman (Scottish, English and German)
33rd President, 1945–1953: His paternal great-great-great-great-grandfather, Thomas Monteith, was a merchant from Glasgow.
Lyndon B. Johnson (English, German and Scotch-Irish)
36th President, 1963–1969::
Richard Nixon (Scotch-Irish, Irish, English and German)
37th President, 1969–1974: The Nixon ancestors left Ulster in the mid–18th century; the Quaker Milhous family ties were with County Antrim and County Kildare.
Gerald Ford (Scottish and English)
38th President, 1974–1977: His maternal great-grandfather, Alexander Gardner, emigrated to Quebec from Kilmacolm in 1820.
Jimmy Carter (Scottish, Scotch-Irish and English)
39th President, 1977–1981: His paternal great x 6 grandfather, Adam Clinkskaill, was Scottish.
Ronald Reagan (Irish, Scottish and English)
40th President, 1981–1989: His great-grandfather, John Wilson, emigrated to North America from Paisley in 1832.
George H. W. Bush (Scottish, Irish and English)
41st President, 1989–1993: His maternal great-great-great-grandmother, Catherine Walker (née McLelland), was Scottish.
Bill Clinton (Scotch-Irish and English)
42nd president, 1993–2001: His father and mother were Old Stock Americans with family lineage tracing back to the colonial era.
George W. Bush (Scottish, Irish and English)
43rd President, 2001–2009: His great-great-great-great-grandmother, Catherine Walker (née McLelland), was Scottish.
Barack Obama (Scotch-Irish, English and Kenyan)
44th President, 2009–2017: The ancestry of his mother's family is partially Scotch-Irish.
Donald Trump (Scottish and German)
45th and 47th President, 2017–2021 and 2025–present: His mother, Mary Anne MacLeod, was born in the village of Tong, Isle of Lewis, and emigrated to the U.S. in 1930.

=== Vice Presidents of Scottish or Scotch-Irish descent ===
John C. Calhoun (Scotch-Irish)
10th Vice President, 1825–1832
George M. Dallas (Scottish)
15th Vice President, 1845–1849; former Secretary of War
Adlai Stevenson I (Scottish and Scotch-Irish)
23rd Vice President, 1893–1897: The Stevensons (Stephensons) are first recorded in Roxburghshire in the 18th century.
Charles Curtis (Scottish)
31st Vice President, 1929–1933
Henry A. Wallace (Scotch-Irish)
33rd Vice President, 1941–1945
Walter Mondale (Scottish)
42nd Vice President, 1977–1981: His maternal great-grandparents, Walter Cowan and Agnes Phorson, were Scottish.
Al Gore (Scotch-Irish)
45th Vice President, 1993–2001
Dick Cheney (Scottish)
46th Vice President, 2001–2009
JD Vance (Scotch-Irish)
50th Vice President, 2025-present

=== Other American presidents of Scottish or Scotch-Irish descent ===
Sam Houston (Scotch-Irish)
President of Texas, 1836–1838 and 1841–1844
Jefferson Davis (Scotch-Irish)
President of Confederate States of America, 1861–1865
Arthur St. Clair (Scottish)
President under the Articles of Confederation, 1788

== Scottish placenames ==
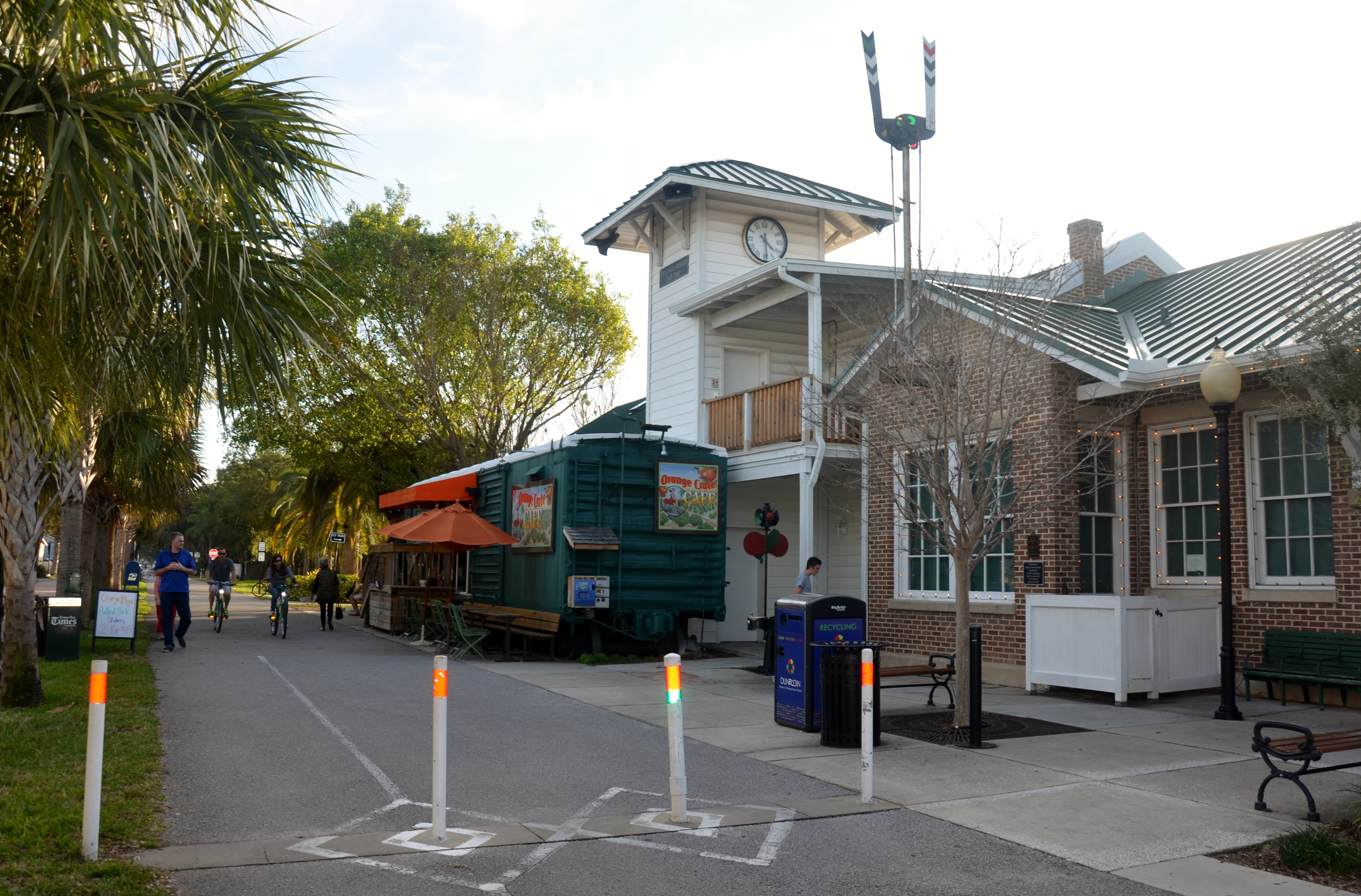
Dunedin, Florida

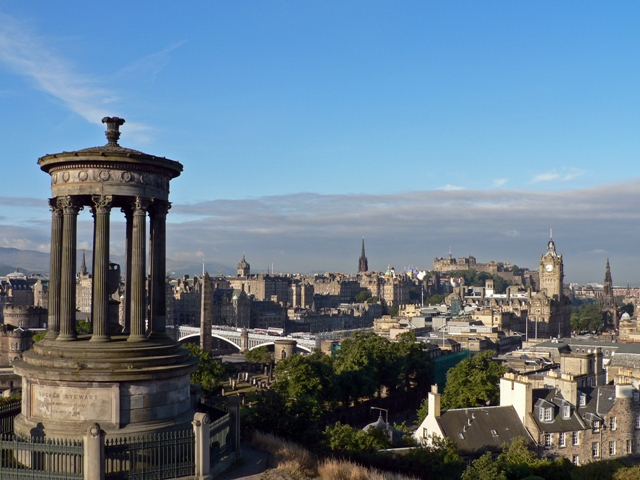
Edinburgh, Scotland

Dunedin, Florida (left) was founded in 1882 by two Scottish merchants, J.O. Douglas and James Somerville and is named after Dùn Èideann, Scottish Gaelic for "Edinburgh" (right).

Some place names of Scottish origin (either named after Scottish places or Scottish immigrants) in the U.S. include:

- California
  - Albion
  - Ben Lomond
  - Bonny Doon
  - Inverness
  - Irvine, named for the historic Irvine Ranch, and Irvine Subdivision of Orange County, California
- Colorado
  - Montrose
- Connecticut
  - Scotland
- Delaware
  - Glasgow
  - Perth
- Florida
  - Aberdeen
  - Paisley
  - Dundee
  - Dunedin, from Dùn Èideann, Scottish Gaelic for Edinburgh
  - Inverness
- Illinois
  - Dundee
  - Elgin
  - Inverness
  - Midlothian
  - Bannockburn
  - Glencoe
- Indiana
  - Perth
  - Edinburgh
- Kansas
  - Dundee
- Kentucky
  - Glasgow
- Louisiana
  - Gretna
  - Scotlandville
- Maine
  - Argyle
- Maryland
  - Aberdeen
  - Glencoe
  - Glenelg
  - Lochearn
  - Lothian
  - Midlothian
  - Muirkirk
- Massachusetts
  - Melrose
- Mississippi
  - Aberdeen
- Montana
  - Glasgow
  - Aberdeen, Montana
  - Inverness, Montana
  - Drummond, Montana
- New Jersey
  - Aberdeen
  - Perth Amboy
  - Scotch Plains
- New York
  - Albany
  - Argyle
  - Dundee
  - Perth
- North Carolina
  - Aberdeen
  - Clyde
  - Cumnock
  - Dundarrach
  - Glencoe
  - Highlands
  - Inverness
  - Roxboro – a variant spelling of Roxburgh
  - Scotland County
- North Dakota
  - Perth
  - Perth Township
- Oklahoma
  - Glencoe
  - Guthrie
- Oregon
  - Albany
  - Burns – after Scottish poet Robert Burns
  - Dundee
  - Elgin
  - Glencoe
  - Hermiston
  - Macleay
  - McDonald
  - McEwen
  - Melrose
  - Nibley
  - Sutherlin – a variant spelling of Sutherland
  - Paisley
  - Wedderburn
- Pennsylvania
  - Edinboro – a variant spelling of Edinburgh
  - Glasgow
  - Scotland – Franklin County town, fictional site of the motion picture Scotland, PA
- South Carolina
  - Elgin
  - Lake Murray
- Texas
  - Argyle – a variant spelling of Argyll
  - Dallas
  - Edinburg – a variant spelling of Edinburgh
  - Houston – suburbs include Montrose
  - Midlothian
  - Scotland
- Utah
  - Argyle (now a ghost town)
  - Ben Lomond
  - Logan
- Virginia
  - Dumfries
  - Glasgow
  - Gretna
  - Hamilton
  - Kilmarnock
  - McDowell
  - Midlothian
- Washington
  - Aberdeen
  - Fife
- Wisconsin
  - Argyle
  - Dunbar

== See also ==
- Scottish diaspora
- Americans
  - British Americans
  - Cornish Americans
  - English Americans
  - Irish Americans
  - Scotch-Irish Americans
  - Welsh Americans
- Celtic music in the United States
- Scots by country
  - Scots-Quebecers
  - Scottish Canadians
  - Scottish Australians
  - Scottish New Zealanders
  - Scottish Brazilians
  - Scottish Argentines
