= Tremain =

Tremain is a Cornish language surname and, rarely, forename.

Notable people with the surname include:

- Chris Tremain (born 1966), New Zealand politician
- Garrick Tremain (1941–2025), New Zealand cartoonist and painter
- George Tremain (1874–1948), Justice of the Indiana Supreme Court
- Kel Tremain (1938–1992), New Zealand international rugby player
- Lyman Tremain (1819–1878), American politician
- Rose Tremain (born 1943), British historical novelist

Notable people with the forename include:

- Tremain Mack (born 1974), American football player

== See also ==
- Johnny Tremain, 1943 children's novel by Esther Forbes
- Johnny Tremain (film), based on the novel
- Tremaine (disambiguation)
- Tremayne (disambiguation)
