= Tremayne =

Tremayne is a Cornish language surname.

Notable people with the surname include:

- Arthur Tremayne (1827–1905), Crimean War soldier and Cornish MP
- Brycen Tremayne (born 1999), American football player
- David Tremayne, British motorcycling journalist
- Edmund Tremayne (c. 1525 – 1582), English conspirator and official dedicated to Protestantism in opposition to Mary I of England
- Henry Hawkins Tremayne (1741–1829), clergyman and squire of Heligan
- John Hearle Tremayne (1780–1851), Cornish MP and High Sheriff of Cornwall
- John Tremayne (1825–1901), MP for constituencies in both Cornwall and Devon, and High Sheriff of Cornwall
- John Tremayne Babington (later John Tremayne Tremayne), British Air Marshal and High Sheriff of Cornwall
- Les Tremayne (1913–2003), English radio, film, and television actor
- Ross Tremayne (born 1959), American martial artist, bail enforcement agent

Notable people with the given name include:

- Tremayne Anchrum (born 1998), American football player

== See also ==
- Tremain (disambiguation)
- Tremaine (disambiguation)
- Tremayne, Cornwall, the name of a settlement
