= William S. Harley =

American businessman and co-founder of the Harley-Davidson Motor Company

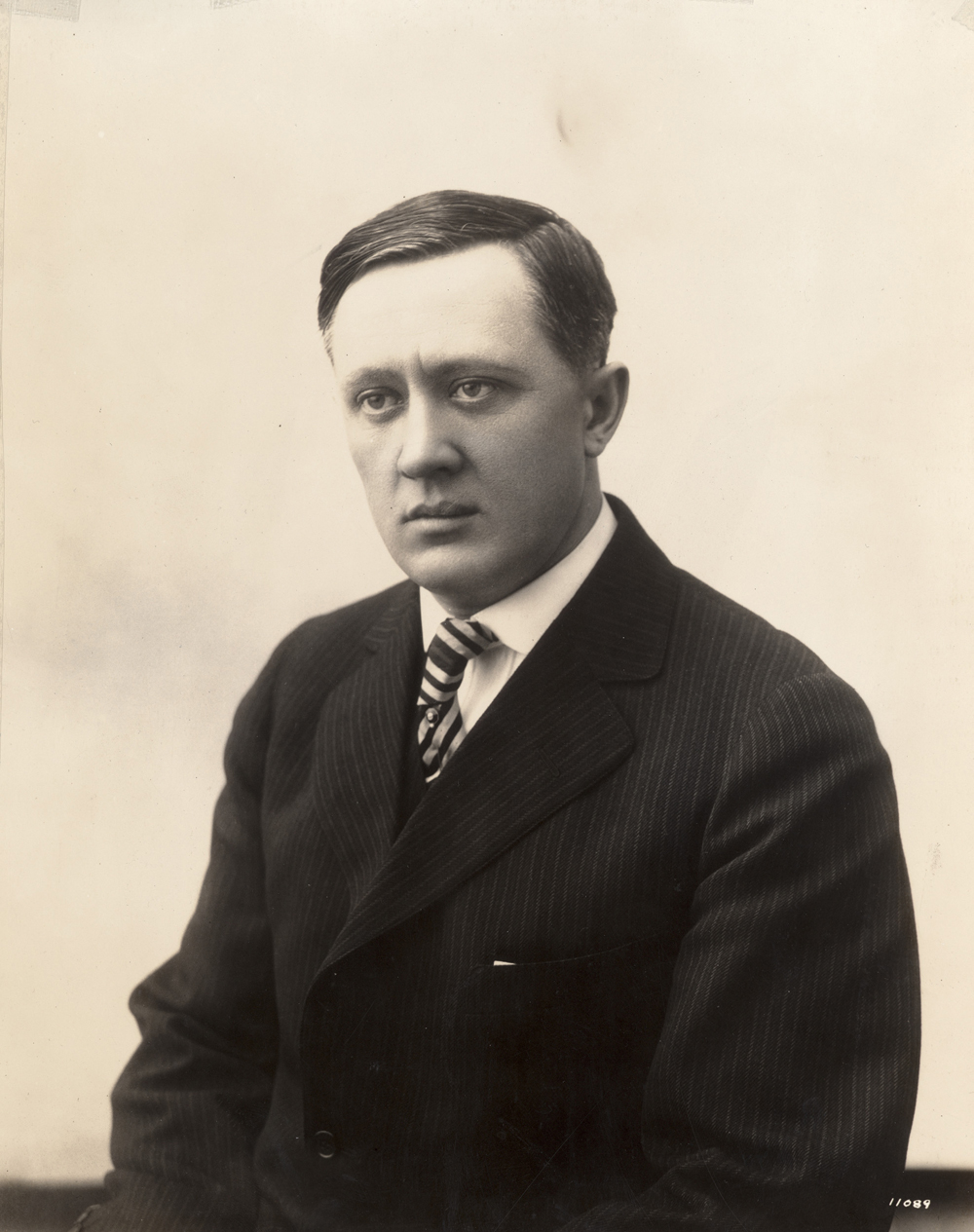
- William S. Harley
- Born: William Sylvester Harley; December 29, 1880; Milwaukee, Wisconsin, U.S.
- Died: September 18, 1943 (aged 62); Milwaukee, Wisconsin, U.S.
- Occupations: Mechanical engineer, businessman
- Years active: 1901–1943
- Known for: Co-founder of Harley-Davidson Motor Company
- Spouse: Anna Jachthuber

William Sylvester Harley (December 29, 1880 – September 18, 1943) was an American mechanical engineer and businessman. He was one of the four co-founders of the Harley-Davidson Motor Company.

== Early life ==
Harley was born in Milwaukee, Wisconsin, in 1880 to William Harley Sr., a railway engineer, and Mary Smith from Littleport, Cambridgeshire, England who emigrated to the United States in 1860.

== Career ==
After moving to Milwaukee's north side on Burleigh Avenue, he started working at the Meiselbach bicycle factory at the age of 15. Harley's interest in bicycles, coupled with his natural mechanical inclination, sparked his curiosity in motorized vehicles. In 1901, while working as an apprentice draftsman at the Barth Mfg. Co., Harley started designing an engine that could be mounted on an ordinary bicycle. Together with his childhood friend Arthur Davidson, they worked on designing a motorized bicycle in a small wooden shed in the Davidson family's backyard.

Over the next few years, Harley and his childhood friend Arthur Davidson worked on their motor-bicycle with the help of Henry Melk, who owned a machine shop in northside Milwaukee. They later received help from Ole Evinrude, who was then building gas engines of his own design for automotive use on Milwaukee's Lake Street. Harley and Davidson built their first successful prototype in 1903, which featured a looped frame, a gasoline-powered engine, and a leather drive belt. The motorcycle was tested and refined over the next few years, with the duo making improvements to the engine, frame, and transmission. By 1906, they had produced a reliable and road-worthy motorcycle that they named the Harley-Davidson.

Harley received a degree in mechanical engineering from the University of Wisconsin–Madison in 1907. He co-founded Harley-Davidson with Arthur Davidson in 1903 and served as chief engineer and treasurer until his death in 1943. While in college he worked at a Madison architect's office and as a waiter for the Kappa Sigma fraternity house.

The first Harley-Davidson factory opened in Milwaukee in 1906, and the company began producing motorcycles for sale to the general public. Harley served as the company's chief engineer, designing and improving their motorcycles until his death in 1943, and is credited with the invention of the first true motorcycle clutch, as well as the company's first Big Twin engine for the 1936 EL "Knucklehead".

== Personal life ==
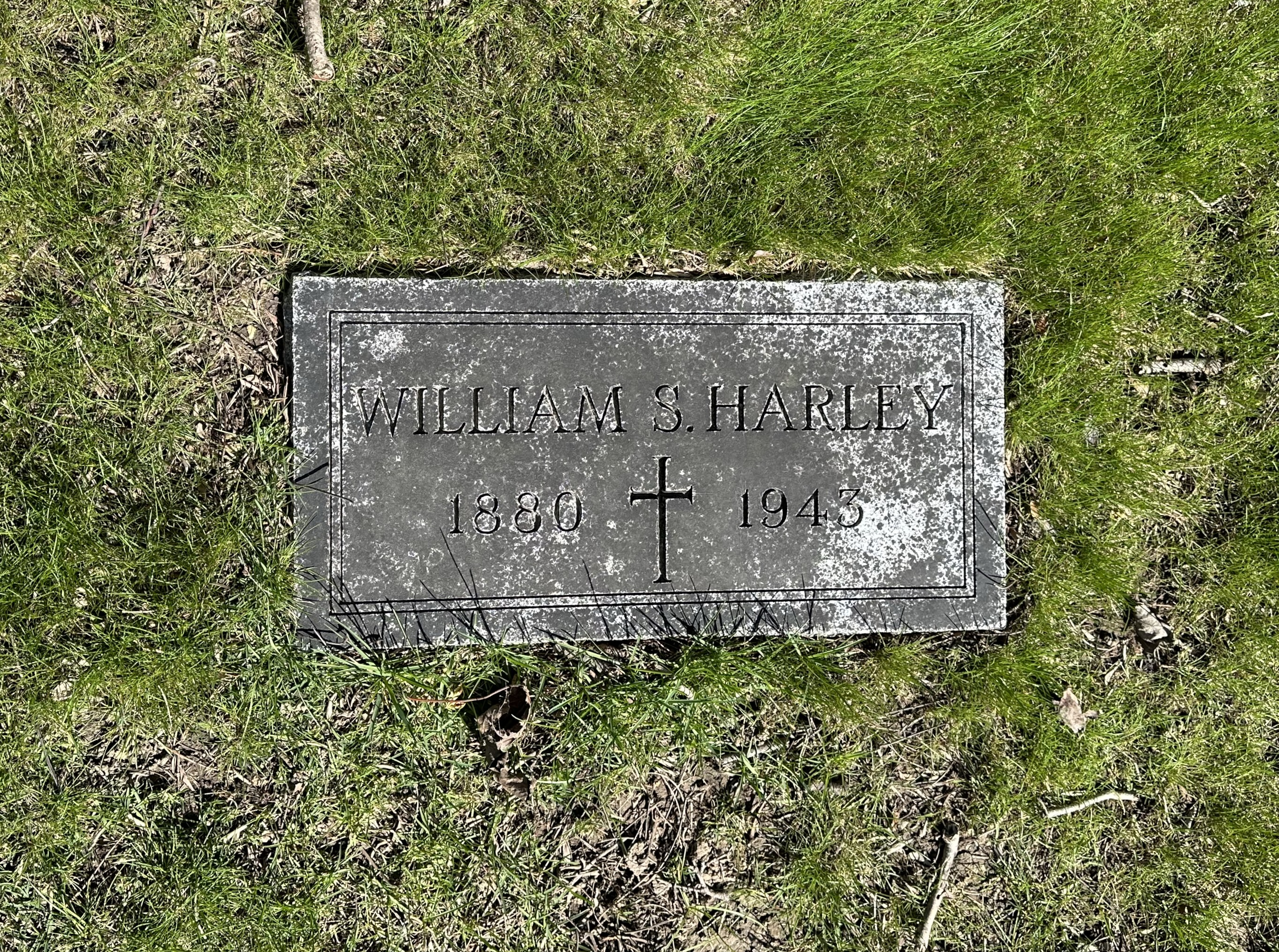
William Sylvester Harley headstone

In 1910 he married Anna Jachthuber, with whom he had two sons and a daughter. In his spare time, Harley took up hunting, fishing and golf, and was also noted for his affinity for sketching and wildlife photography. Harley died of natural causes during a round of golf in Milwaukee on September 18, 1943, at the age of 62.

== Legacy ==
He was inducted into the Motorcycle Hall of Fame in 1998.

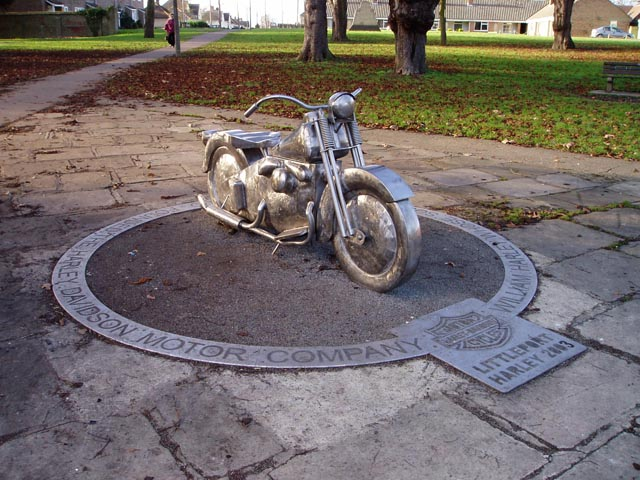
Monument in Littleport, England. The birthplace of his father William Harley Sr.

In 2003, a Harley-Davidson statue was unveiled in Littleport, Cambridgeshire, to commemorate the centenary of the famous motorcycle company. William Harley, the father of the company's co-founder William Sylvester Harley, had been born in Victoria Street, Littleport, in 1835, before emigrating to the United States in 1859.

David Edwards, former-editor of Cycle World, called Harley "the architect of the [Harley-Davidson] Motor Company."

=== Labor Hall of Honor ===
Because Harley, Arthur Davidson, William A. Davidson, and Walter Davidson "used and believed in its products and relied on the dedication of its employees to produce quality motorcycles", the four men were inducted into the Labor Hall of Honor.
