= Trethewey (surname) =

Trethewey is a surname of Cornish origin. It is derived from any of the various settlements in Cornwall called Trethewey.

Notable people with the surname include:

- Fred Trethewey (born 1949), British archdeacon
- Natasha Trethewey (born 1966), American poet
- Richard Trethewey (born c. 1955), American plumber and television personality
- Robert Trethewey (1902–1989), Australian politician
- Tom Trethewey (born 1944), American swimmer
- William Griffith Trethewey (1865–1926), Canadian inventor, prospector and farmer
- William Trethewey (1892–1956), New Zealand sculptor and monumental mason
