= Arthur Davidson (motorcycling) =

American motorcycle businessman

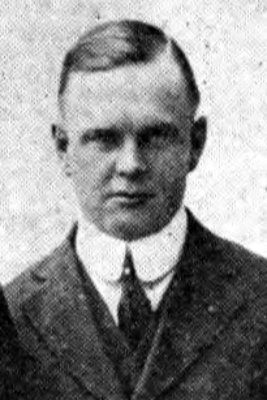
- Born: February 11, 1881; Milwaukee, Wisconsin, U.S.
- Died: December 30, 1950 (aged 69); Wisconsin Highway 59 near Waukesha, Wisconsin, U.S.
- Resting place: Forest Home Cemetery
- Occupations: Secretary and Sales Manager of Harley-Davidson
- Years active: 1901–1950
- Known for: Co-founder of Harley-Davidson
- Spouse: Clara Beisel
- Children: 3
- Relatives: William A. Davidson (eldest brother); Walter Davidson Sr. (older brother)

Arthur Davidson Sr. (February 11, 1881 – December 30, 1950) was an American businessman. He was one of the four founders of Harley-Davidson.

== Early life ==
Davidson was born in Milwaukee, Wisconsin, to William C. Davidson (1846–1923), who was born and raised in Angus, Scotland, and Margaret Adams McFarlane (1843–1933) of Scottish descent from the small Scottish settlement of Cambridge, Wisconsin; they raised five children together: Janet May, William A., Walter, Arthur and Elizabeth. Arthur's grandfather Alexander "Sandy" Davidson (from Aberlemno, Scotland) and Margaret Scott immigrated from Scotland to the United States in 1858 with their six children, including Arthur's father William.

== Career ==
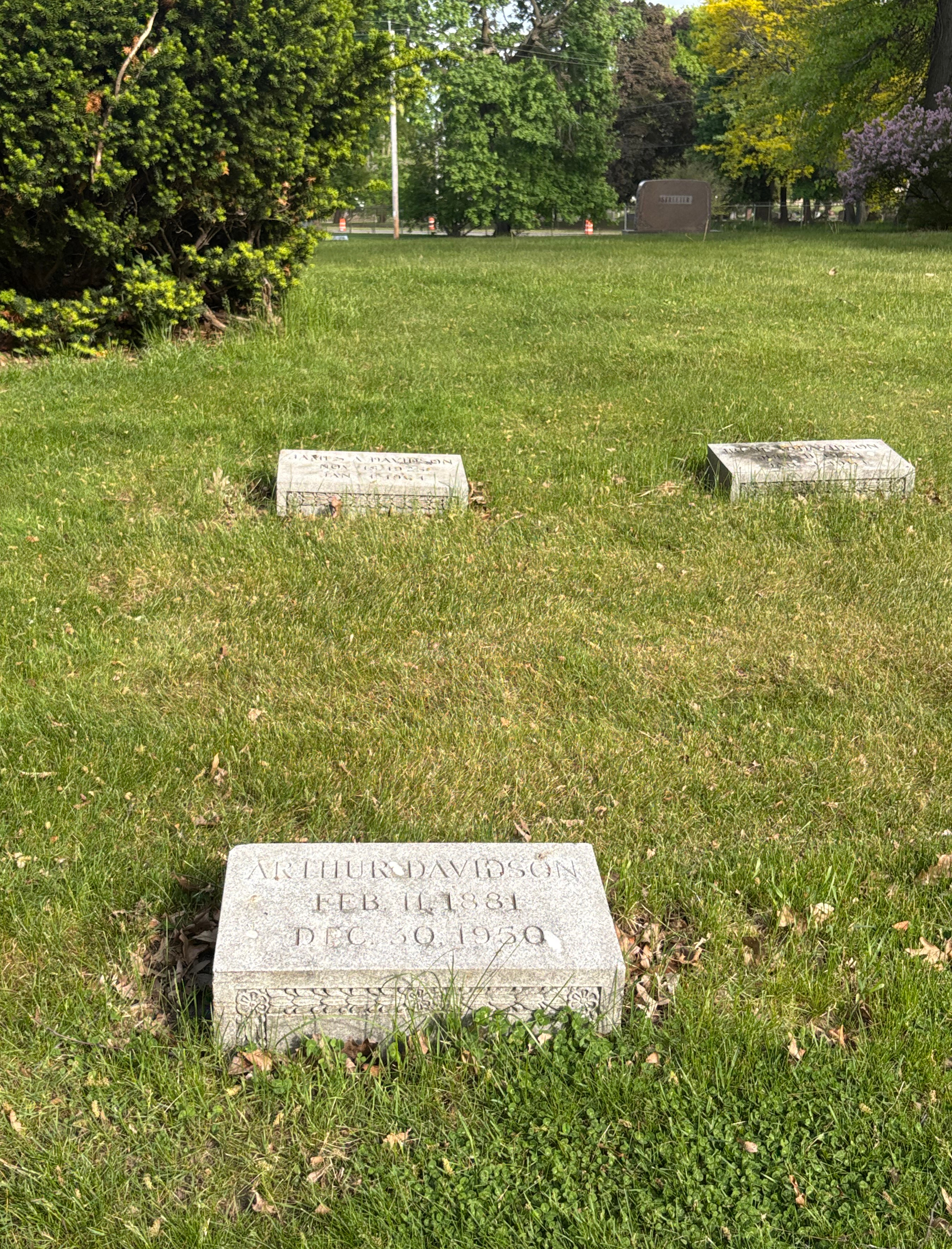
Davidson's grave at Forest Home Cemetery

Eventually they settled in Wisconsin, and it was there that, in 1903, Arthur, went into business with William S. Harley, making motorcycles in his family shed. One of Davidson's favorite pastimes was fishing in the Wisconsin wilderness, which inspired him to create a motorcycle that would, "take the hard work out of pedaling a bicycle". He was a storyteller, salesman, and United States patriot. During World Wars I and II, Arthur and the company diverted motorcycle production to support US troops.

The "Honey Uncle" story is one of the family stories told about Davidson and a pivotal moment for the fate of the Harley-Davidson company. One day shortly after Davidson's cleaning lady visited, he discovered the seed money he had stashed between his mattress to start Harley-Davidson was missing. Davidson was able to borrow the $170 in venture capital needed for Harley-Davidson from an uncle who owned a bee farm in Madison, Wisconsin. From then on, the uncle was known as the "Honey Uncle" for helping the business get off the ground. The bee farm on Lake Mendota was later sold to the University of Wisconsin–Madison, and is now known as Picnic Point in the Lakeshore Nature Preserve.

Besides being one of the co-founders of the Harley-Davidson Motor Company, Davidson also served as director for Koehring Company and the Kellogg Seed Company.

== Personal life ==
Davidson married Clara Davidson in 1908, with whom he had three children. Davidson's interests include youth activities and outdoor sports, which led to his involvement with organizations such as the Milwaukee Boys’ Club, the YMCA, the Izaak Walton League, and the Boy Scouts of America.

== Death ==
Davidson was killed at the age of 69 in a two-car collision 3 miles (4.8 km) south of his home, a dairy farm, on Wisconsin Highway 59 near Waukesha, Wisconsin, on December 30, 1950. Also killed in the accident were Davidson's wife, Clara, as well as Dorothy and Donald Jeffery.

Davidson was buried at Forest Home Cemetery in Milwaukee.

== Labor Hall of Fame ==
Because Arthur Davidson, William A. Davidson, Walter Davidson and William S. Harley, "used and believed in its products and relied on the dedication of its employees to produce quality motorcycles", the four men were inducted into the Labor Hall of Fame.

== Media portrayals ==
Actor Bug Hall portrays Davidson in the 2016 Discovery Channel miniseries Harley and the Davidsons.

Matthew Tissi portrays Davidson in episode 5 of season 16 "Murdoch Rides Easy" (October 10, 2022) of the Canadian television period detective series Murdoch Mysteries.
