= Tremaine =

Tremaine is a Cornish language name, though most often a surname.

== Surname ==
- Emily Hall Tremaine, art director and collector
- F. Orlin Tremaine, science fiction editor
- Jeff Tremaine, film and television producer
- Marilyn Tremaine, computer scientist
- Morris S. Tremaine, NYS Comptroller (1927–1941)
- Scott Tremaine, astrophysicist

== Given name ==
- Tremaine Edmunds, American football player
- Tremaine Emory, American designer
- Tremaine Fowlkes, basketball player
- Trey Songz, was born Tremaine Aldon Neverson

== Fictional character ==
- Lady Tremaine, the main antagonist of the 1950 film Cinderella
  - Drizella and Anastasia Tremaine, Lady Tremaine's daughters and Cinderella's stepsisters
- Lord Robert Tremaine of Barham, a character from the novel The Masqueraders by Georgette Heyer
- Nancy Tremaine, a character from the 2007 Disney film Enchanted named after the aforementioned Lady Tremaine
- Tremaine (novel), an 1825 novel by Robert Plumer Ward
- Tremaine Gidigbi, a character from the television series Footballers' Wives
- Tremaine Valiarde, a main character from the Fall of Ile-Rien trilogy by Martha Wells
- Winthrop Tremaine, a racist government surplus store owner in The Crying of Lot 49 by Thomas Pynchon

== See also ==
- 3806 Tremaine, asteroid
- Davis Wright Tremaine, law firm
- Tremain (disambiguation)
- Tremaine, Cornwall, village in the United Kingdom
- Tremayne (disambiguation)
