= List of Scotch-Irish Americans =

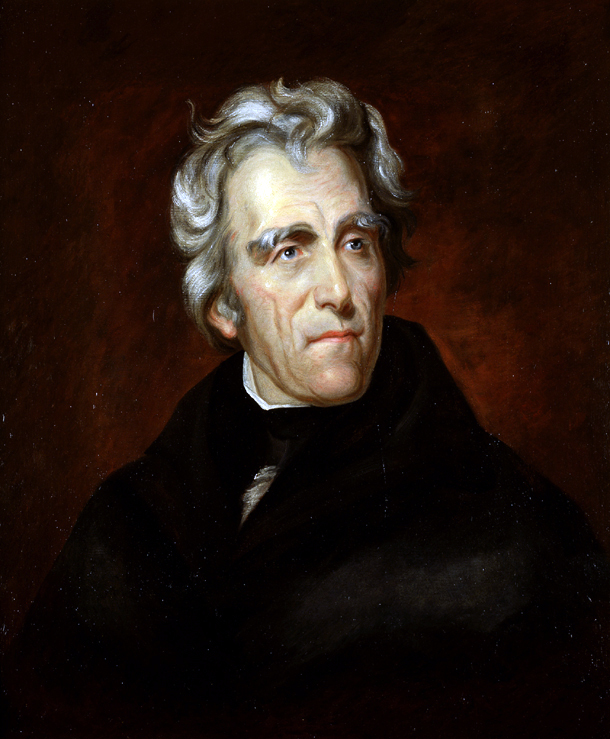
Andrew Jackson, 7th U.S. President (1829–1837)

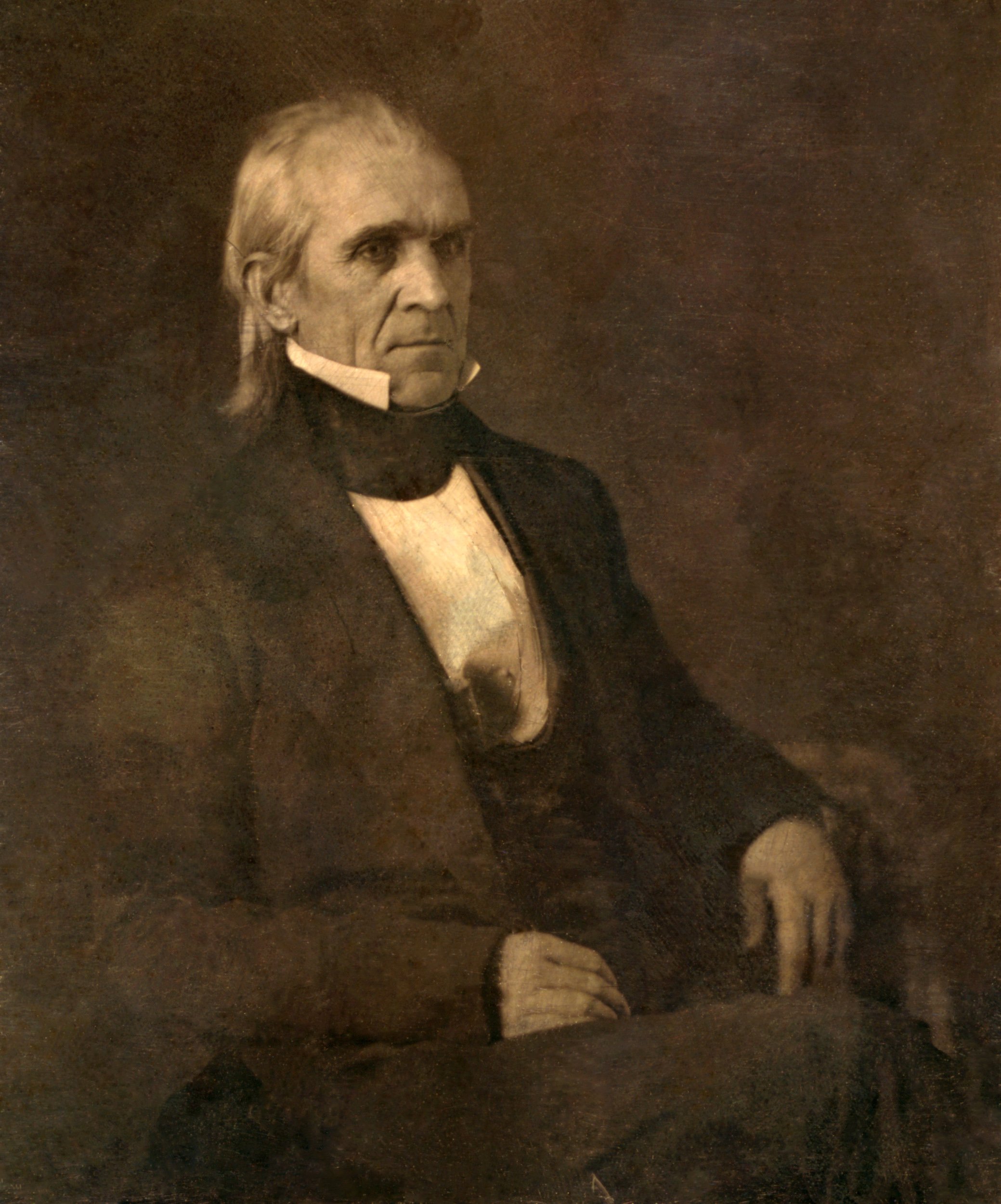
James K. Polk, 11th U.S. President (1845–1849)

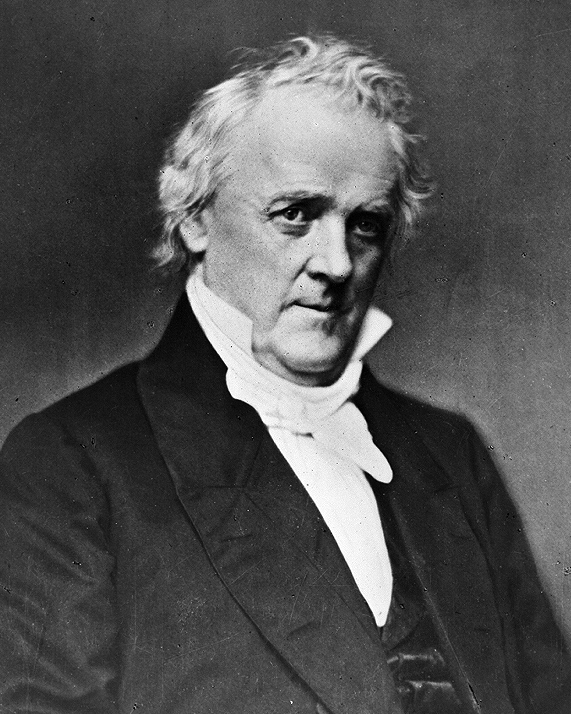
James Buchanan, 15th U.S. President (1857–1861)

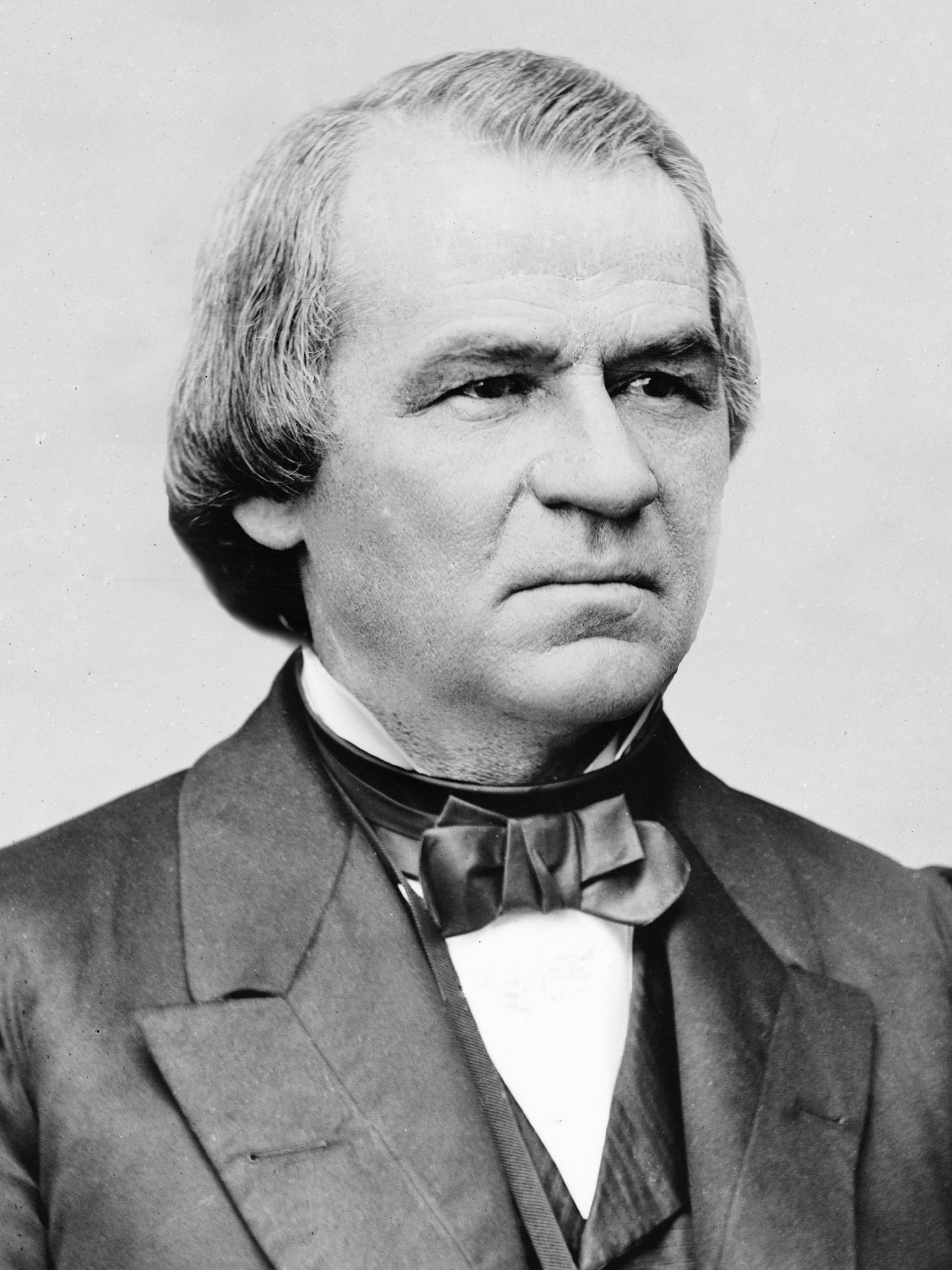
Andrew Johnson, 17th U.S. President (1865–1869)

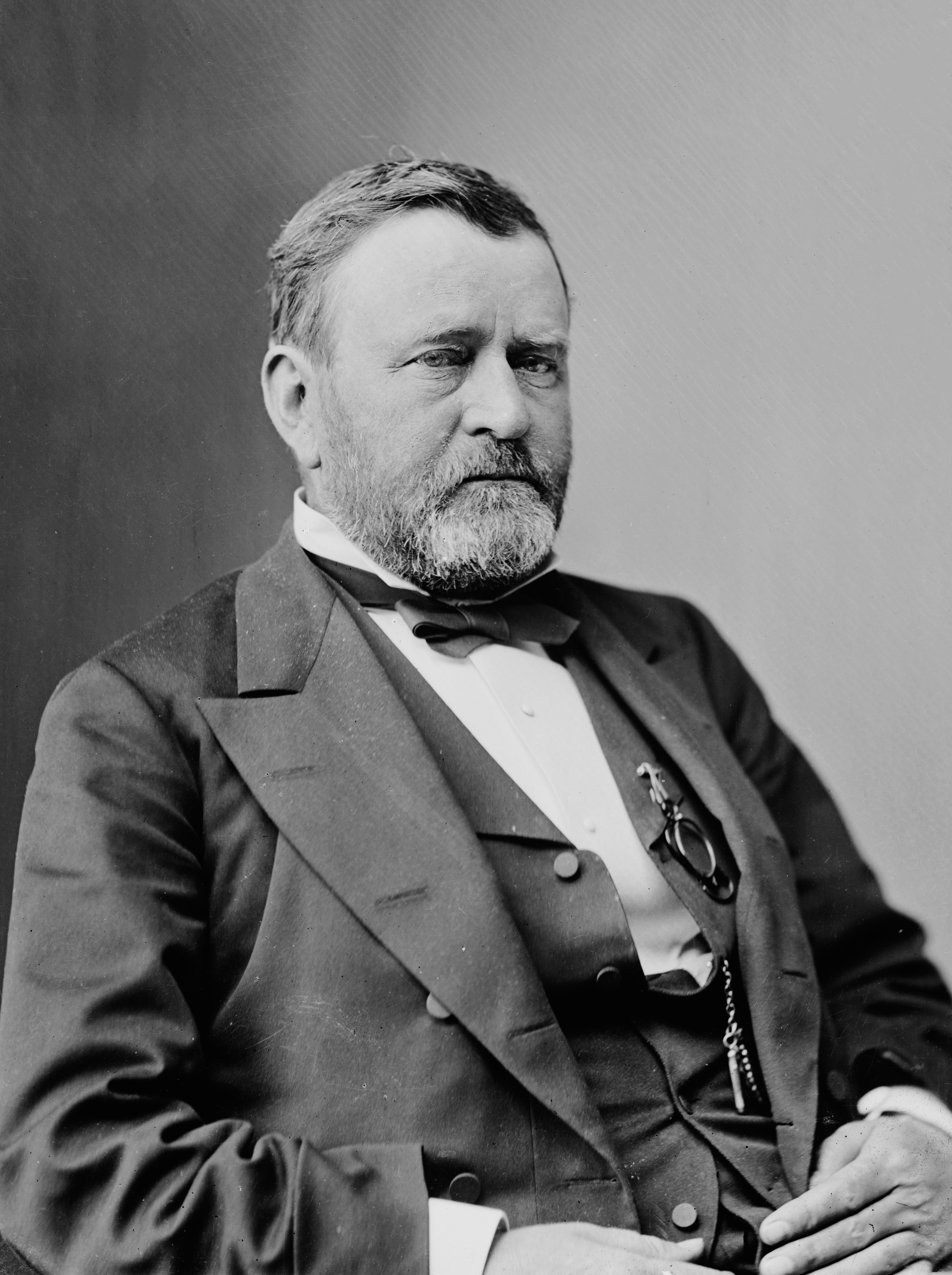
Ulysses S. Grant, 18th U.S. President (1869–1877)

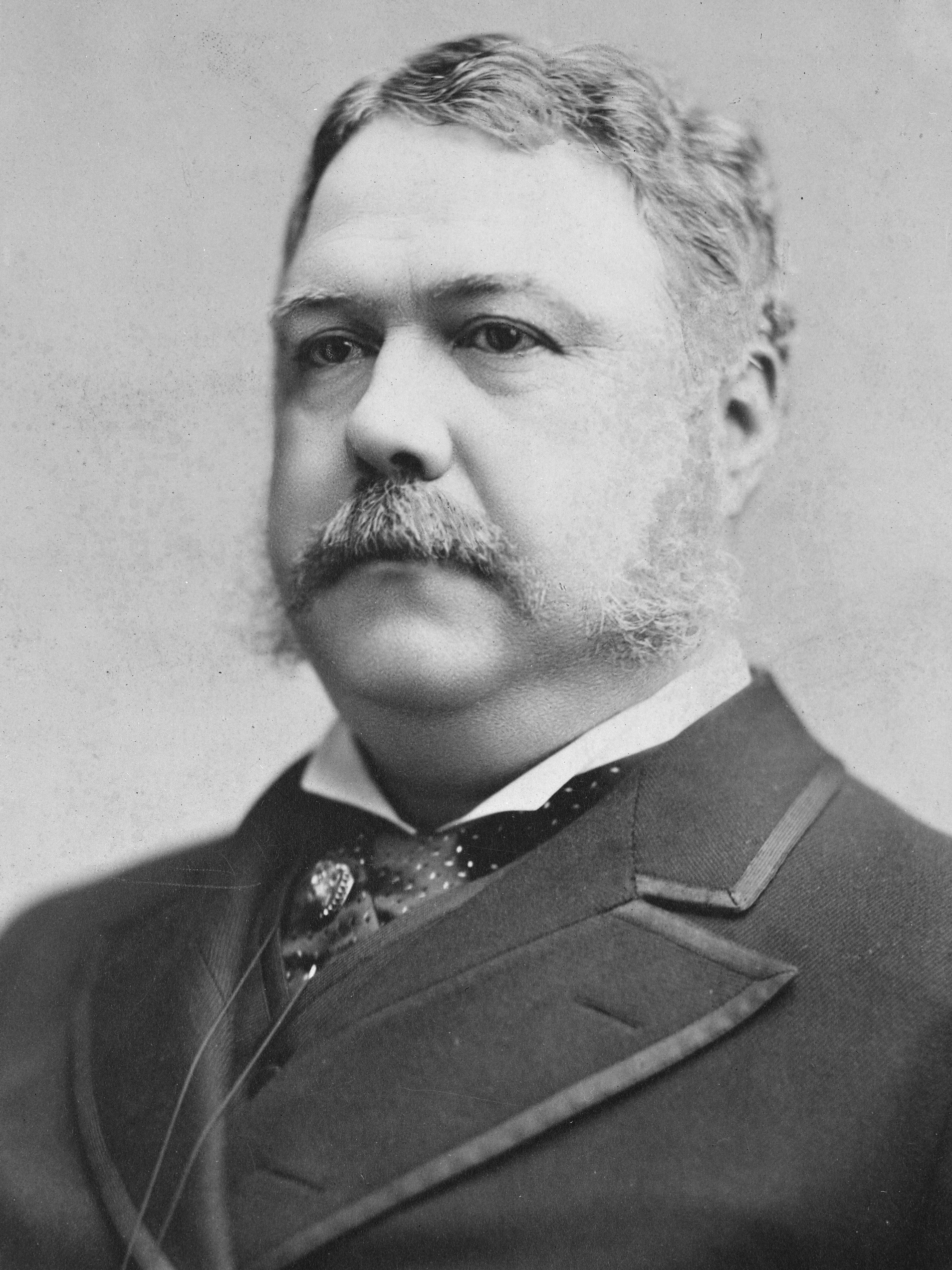
Chester A. Arthur, 21st U.S. President (1881–1885)

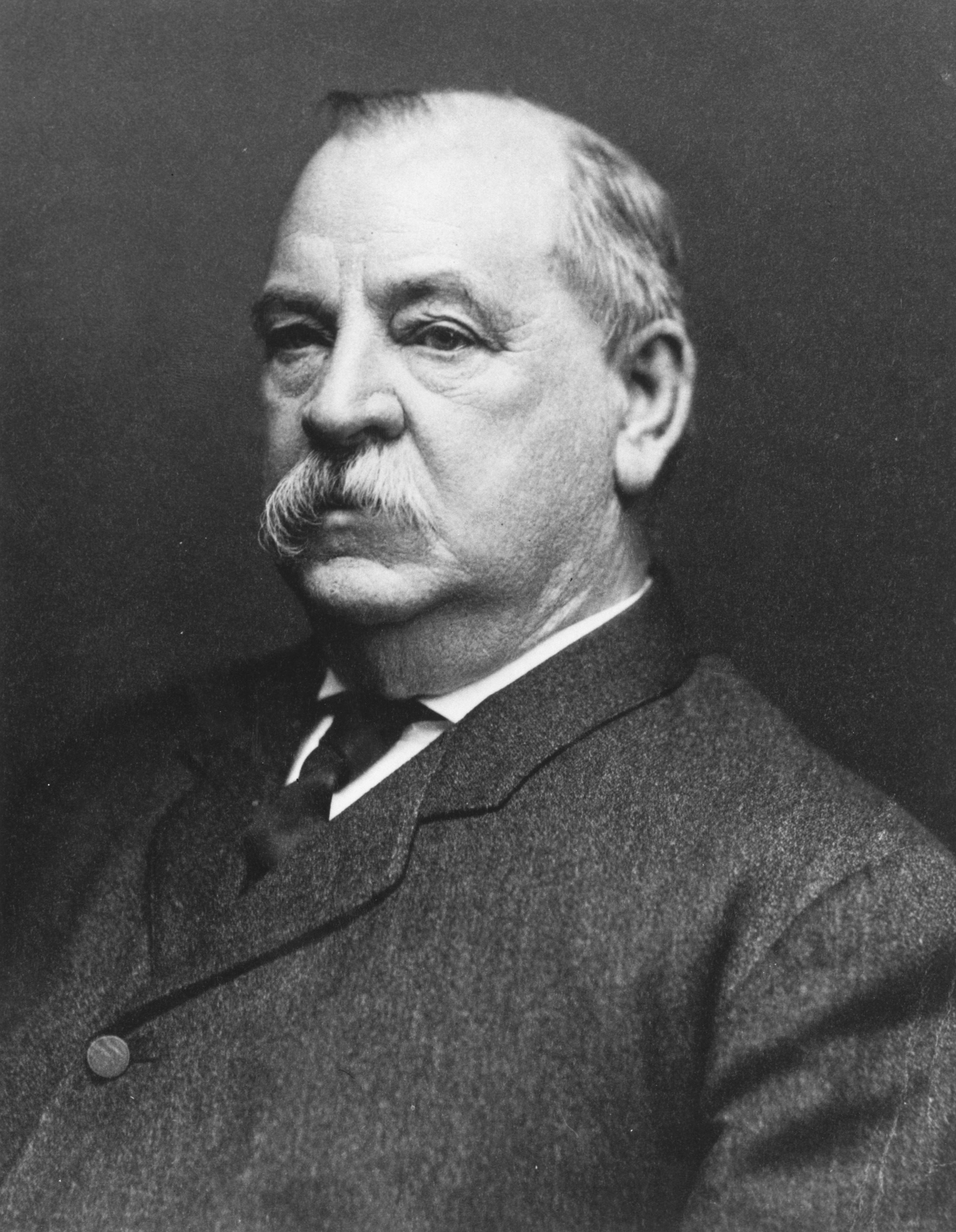
Grover Cleveland, 22nd and 24th U.S. President (1885–1889 and 1893–1897)

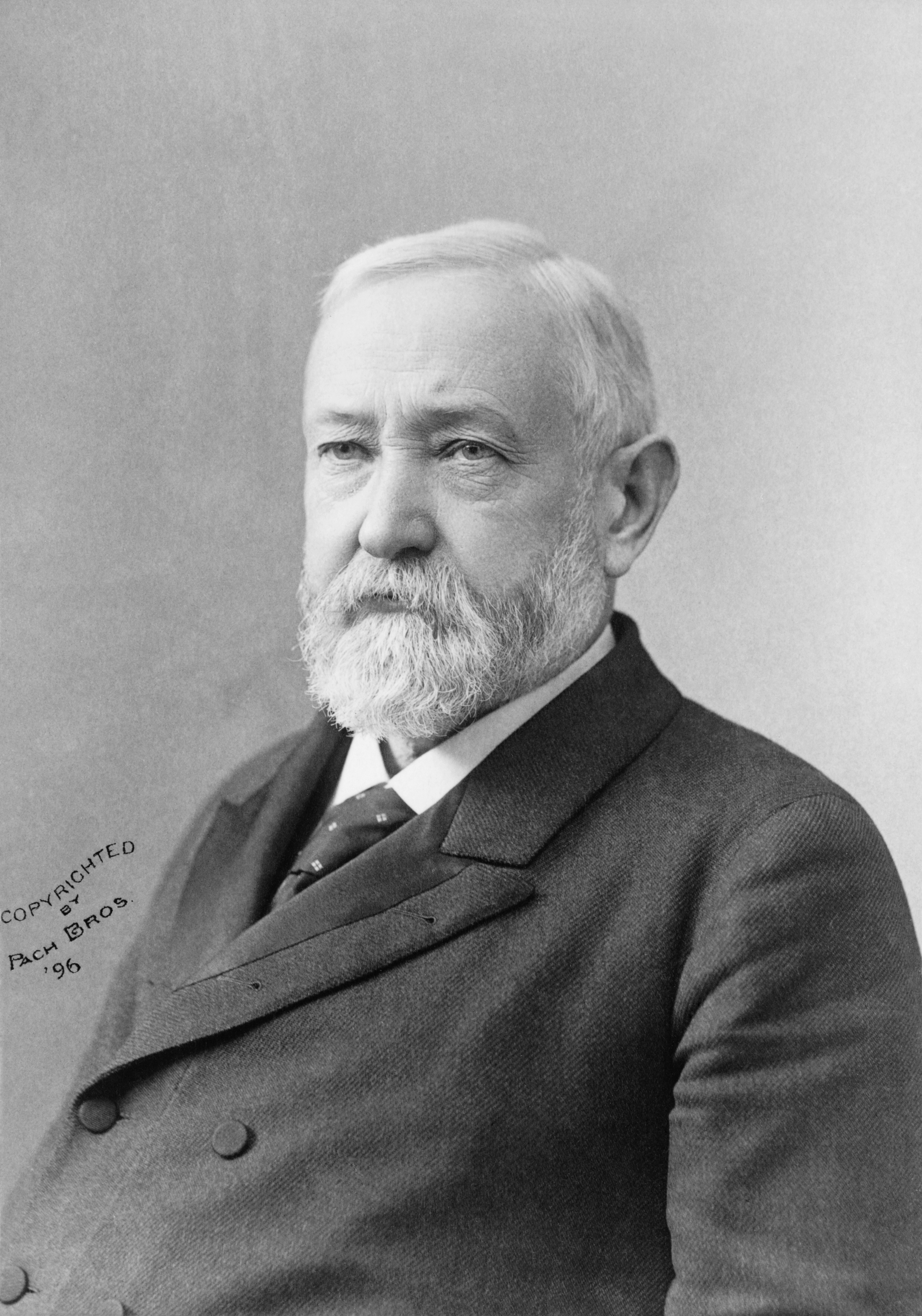
Benjamin Harrison, 23rd U.S. President (1889–1893)

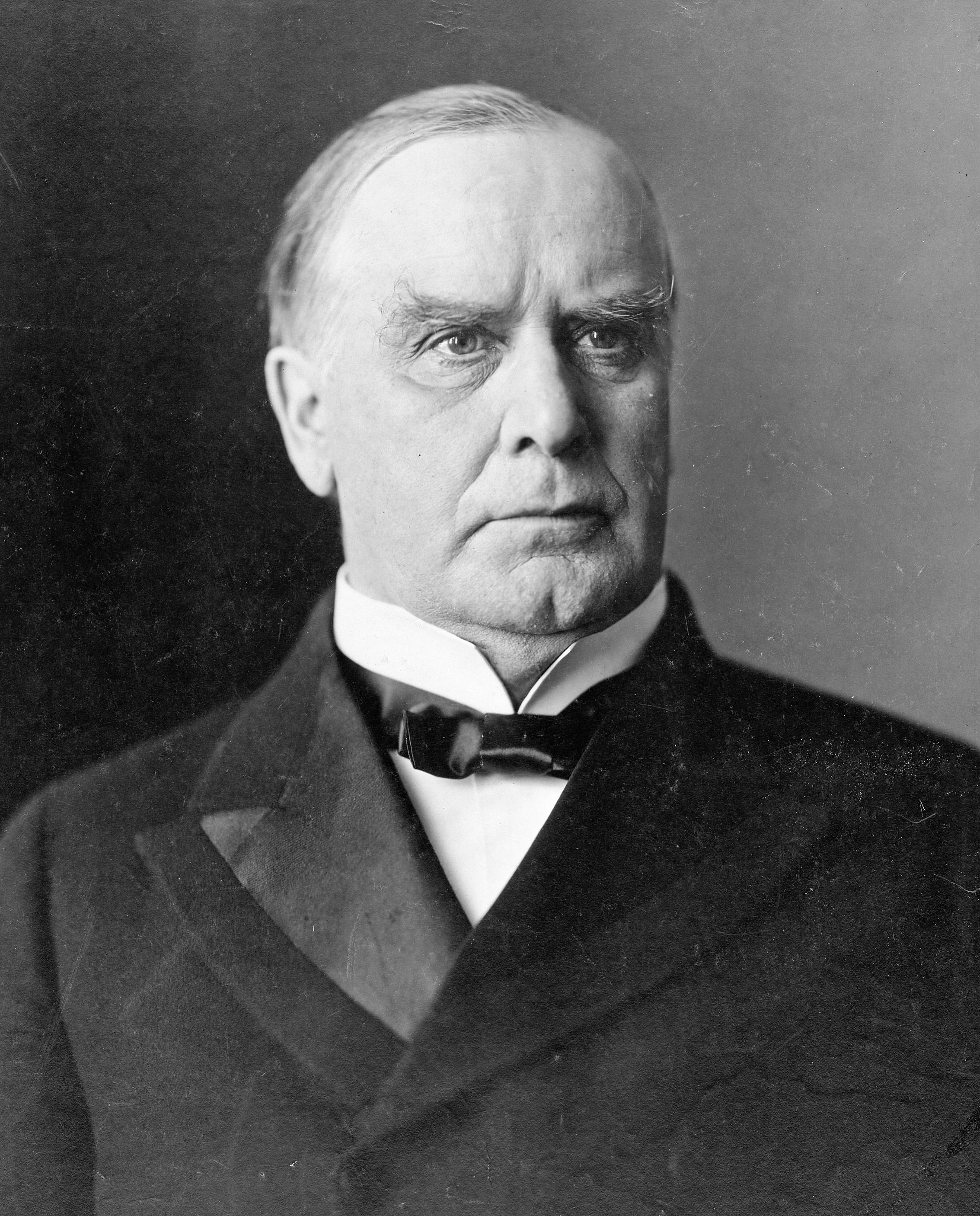
William McKinley, 25th U.S. President (1897–1901)

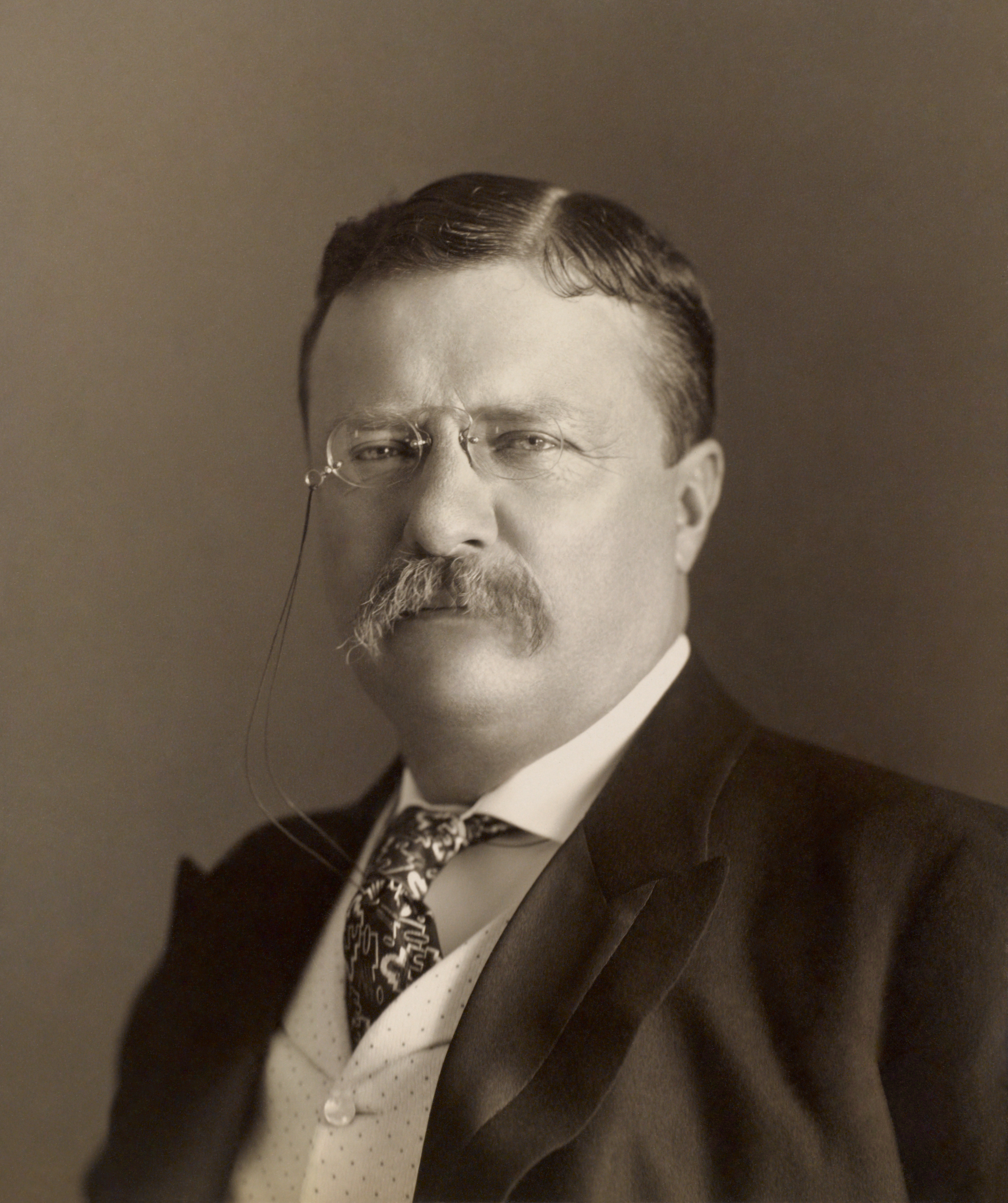
Theodore Roosevelt, 26th U.S. President (1901–1909)

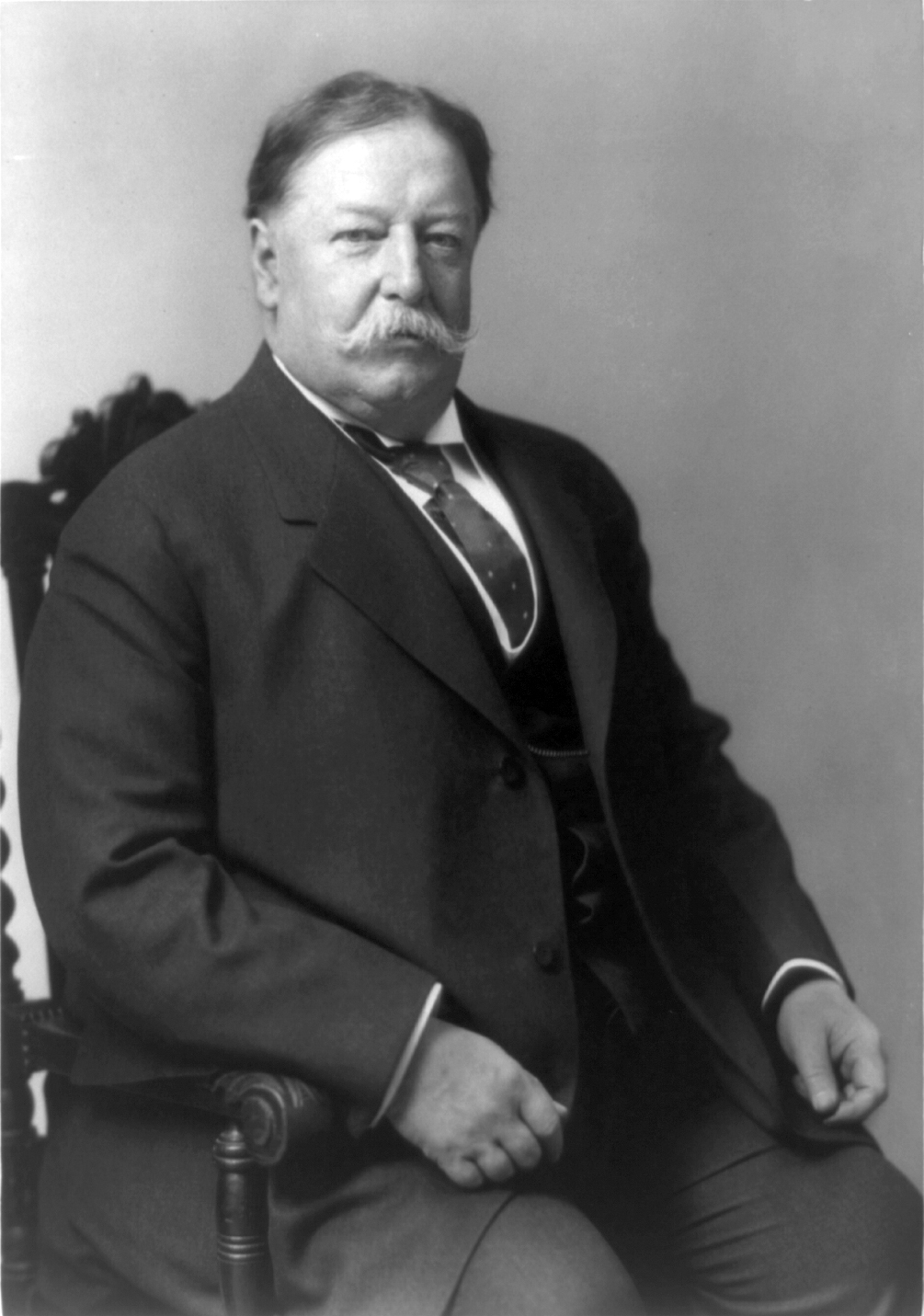
William Howard Taft, 27th U.S. President (1909–1913)

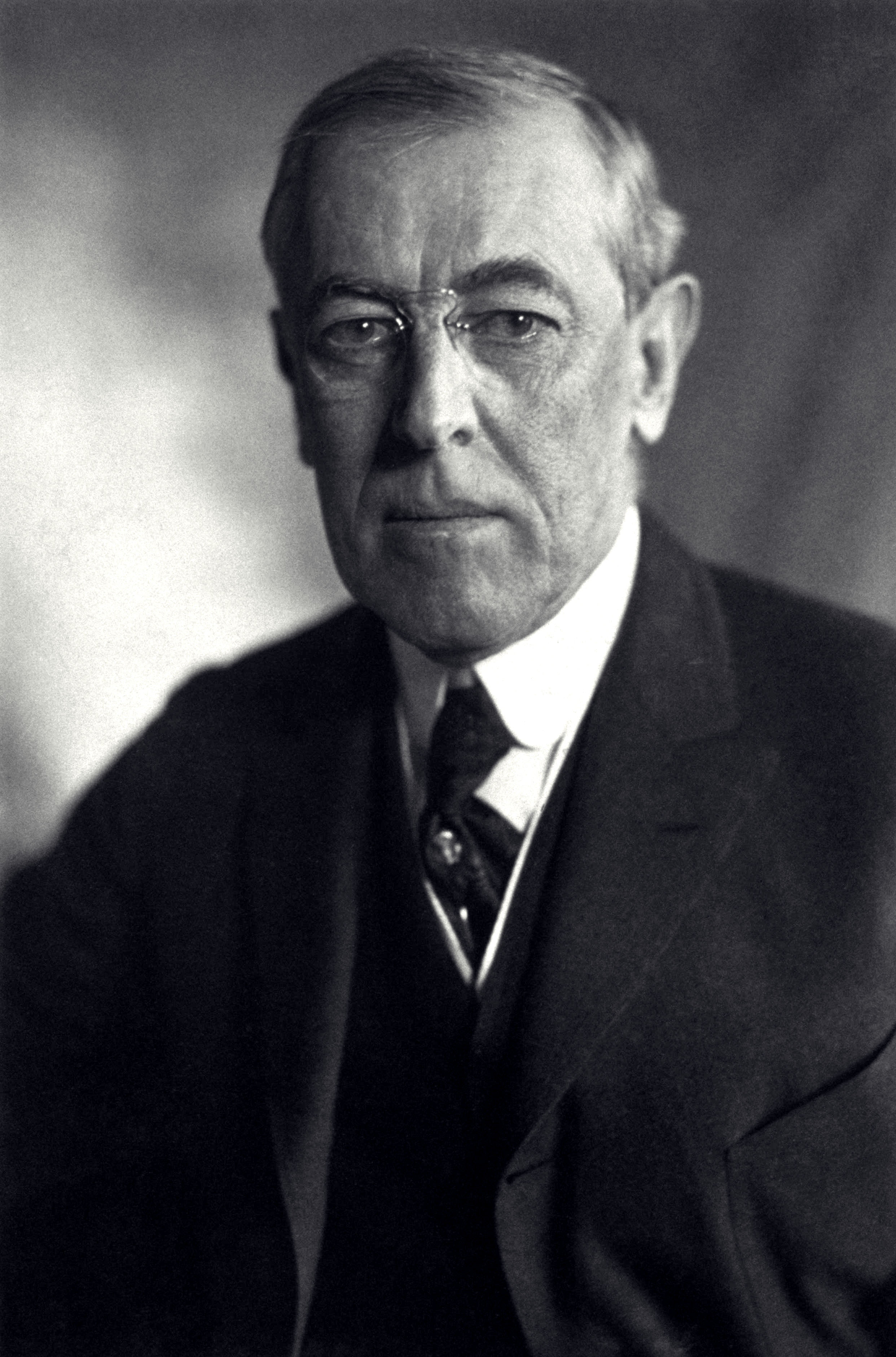
Woodrow Wilson, 28th U.S. President (1913–1921)

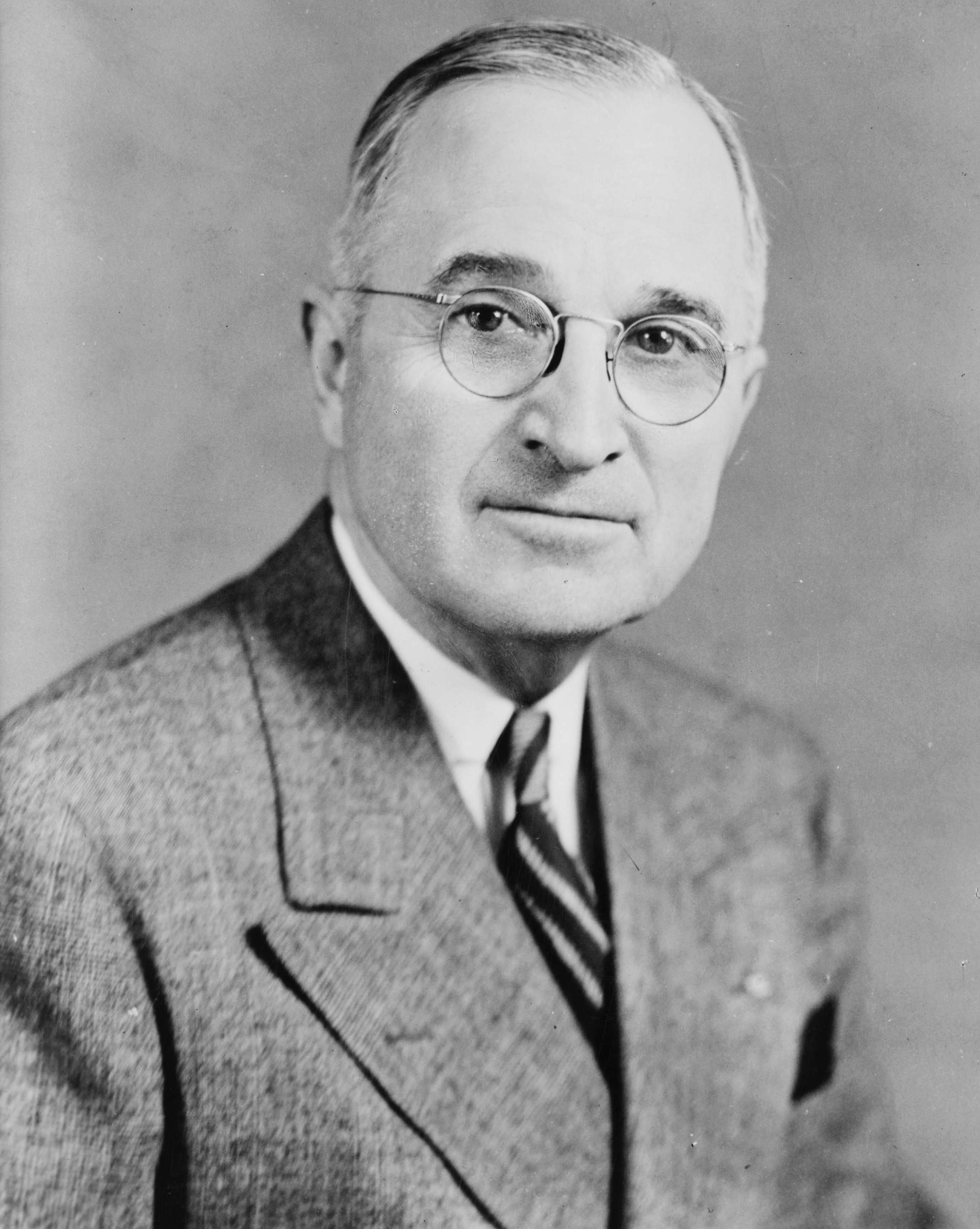
Harry S. Truman, 33rd U.S. President (1945–1953)

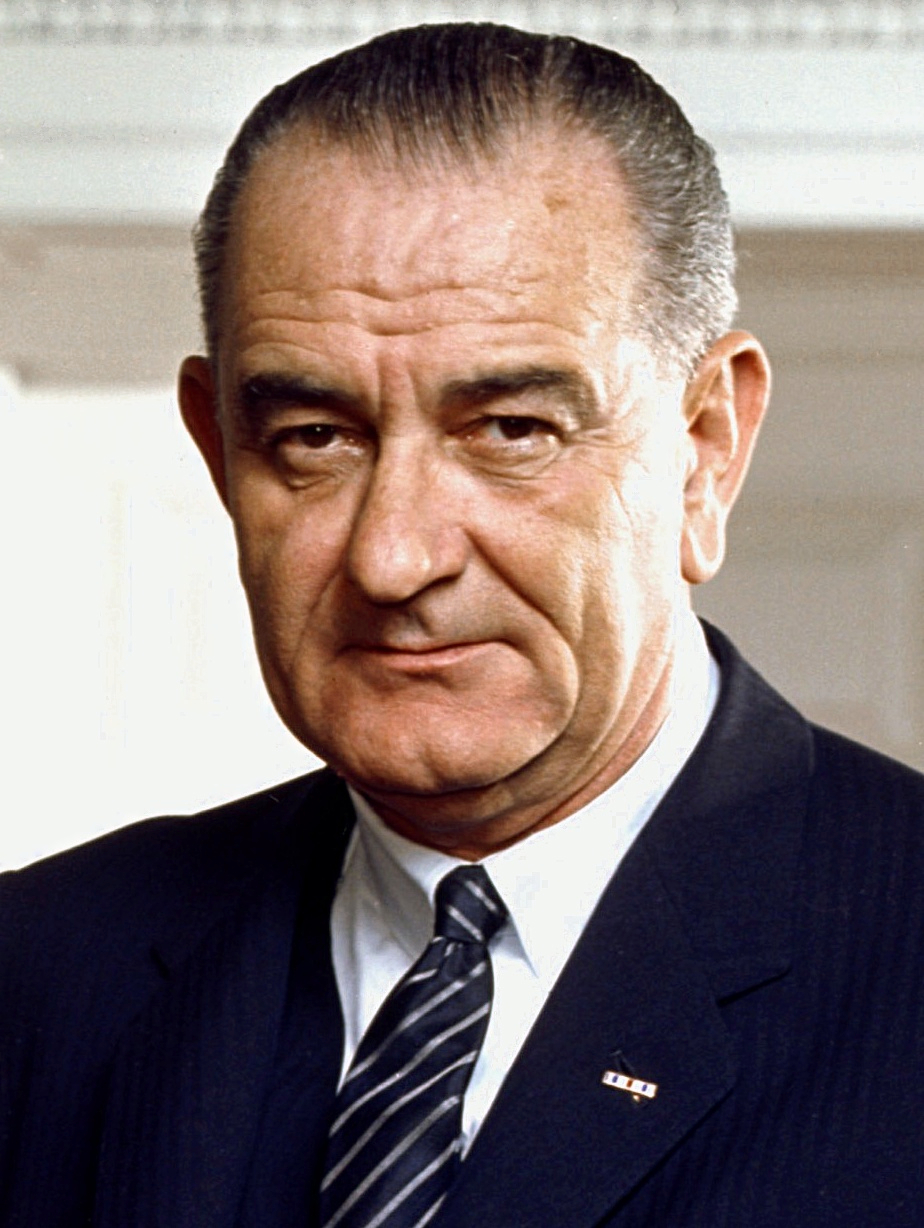
Lyndon B. Johnson, 36th U.S. President (1963–1969)

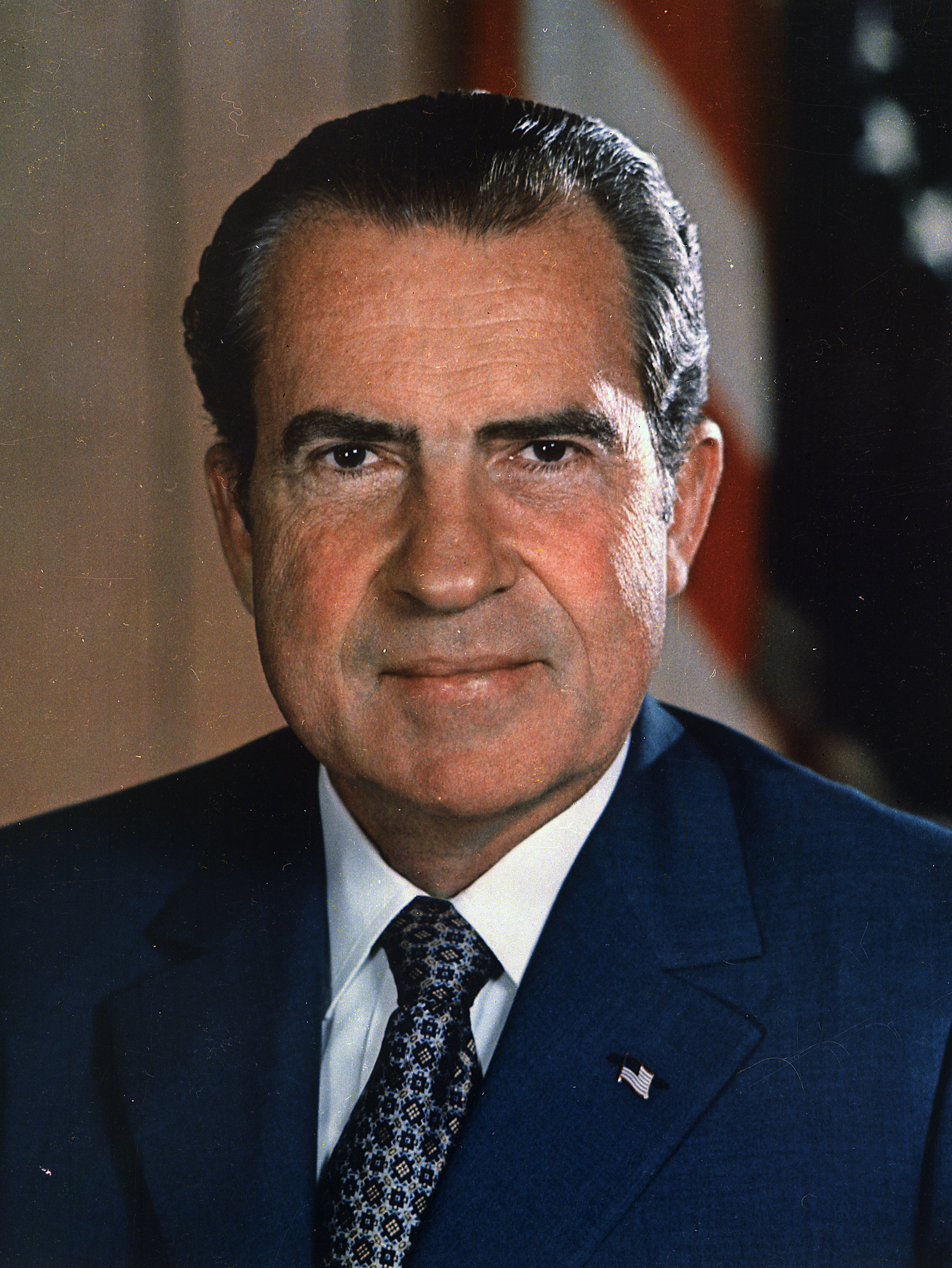
Richard Nixon, 37th U.S. President (1969–1974)

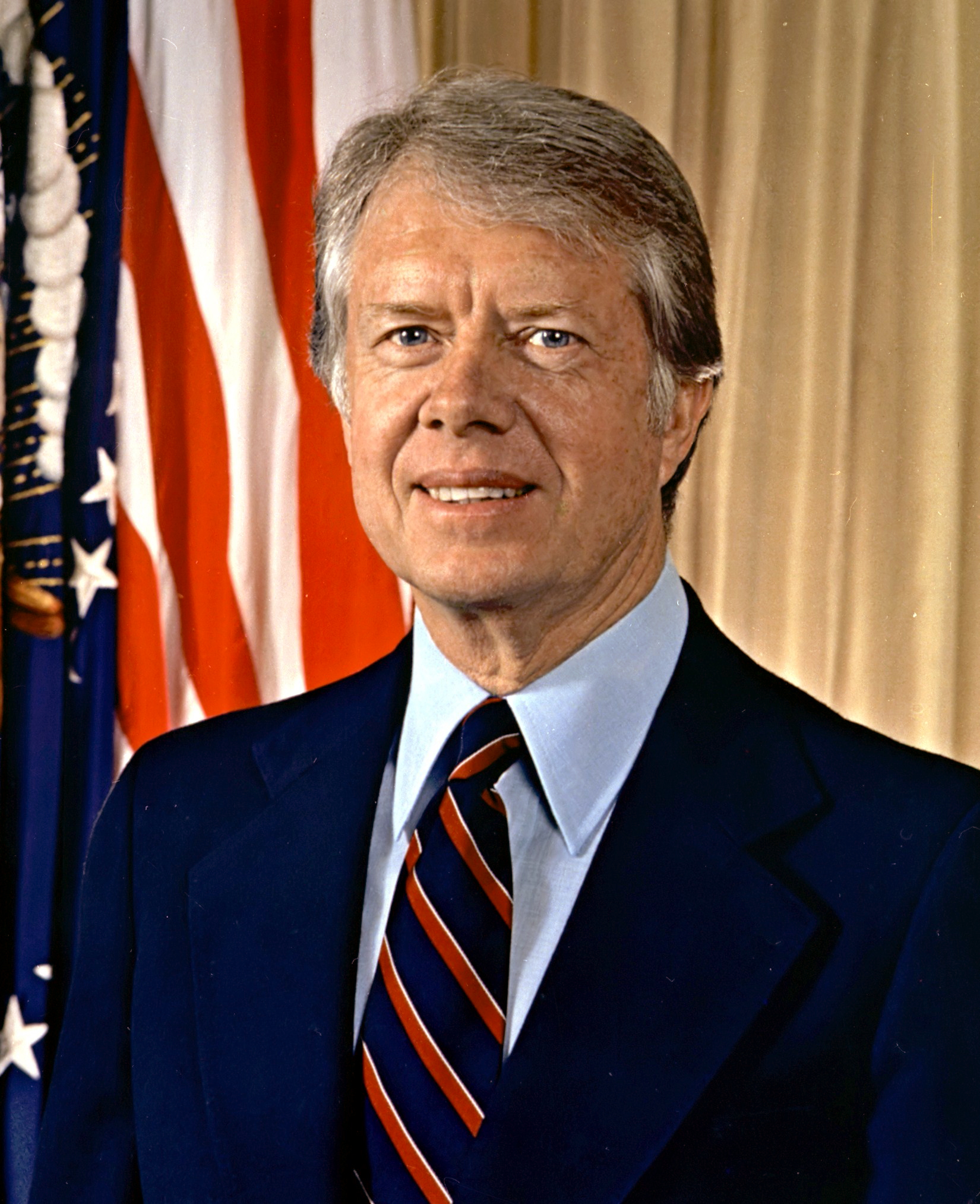
Jimmy Carter, 39th U.S. President (1977–1981)

George H. W. Bush, 41st U.S. President (1989–1993)

Bill Clinton, 42nd U.S. President (1993–2001)

George W. Bush, 43rd U.S. President (2001–2009)

Barack Obama, 44th U.S. President (2009–2017)

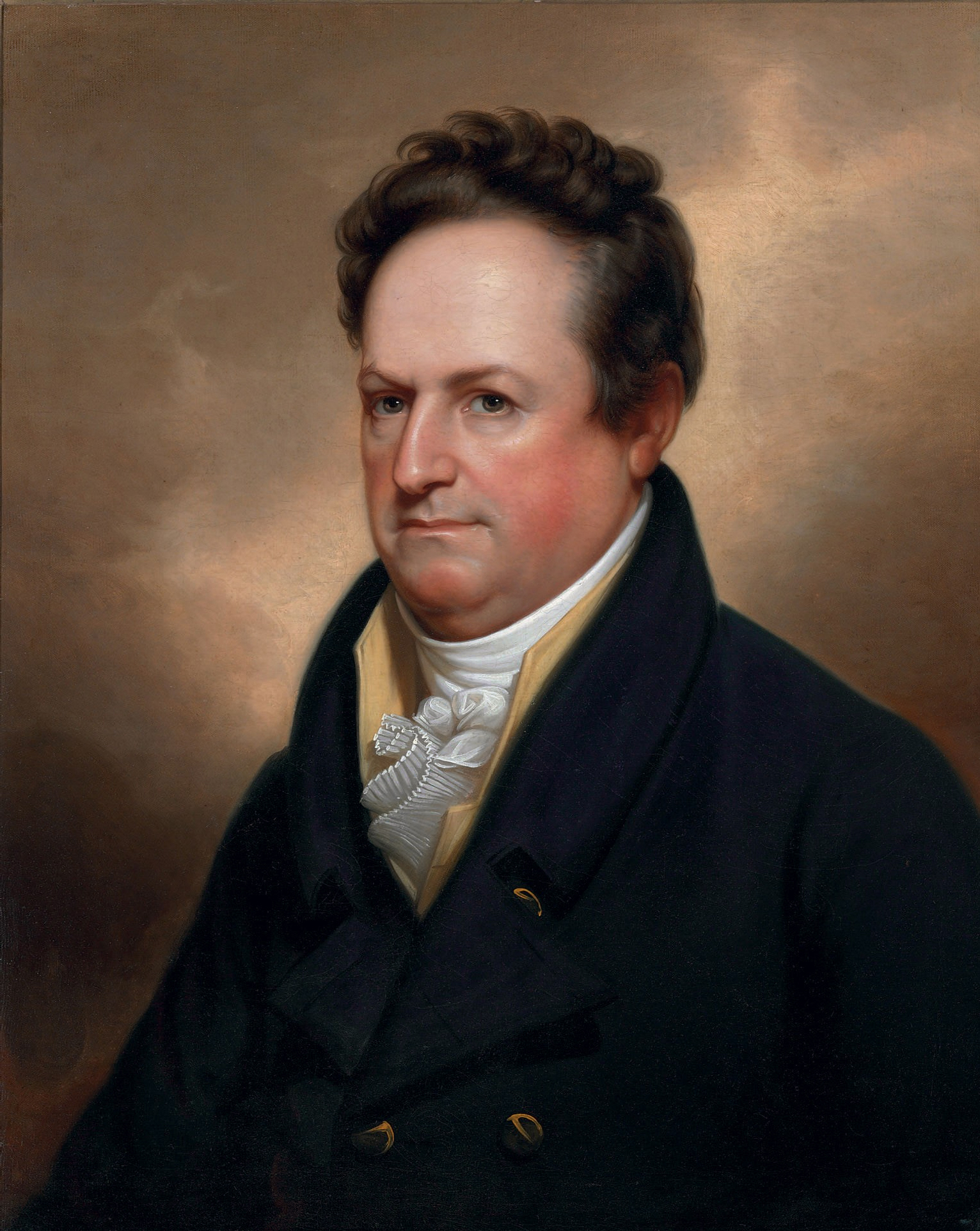
DeWitt Clinton, 1812 Federalist Presidential Nominee (unofficial)

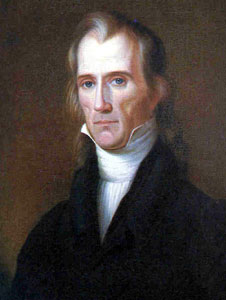
Hugh Lawson White, 1836 Whig Presidential Nominee (Southern)

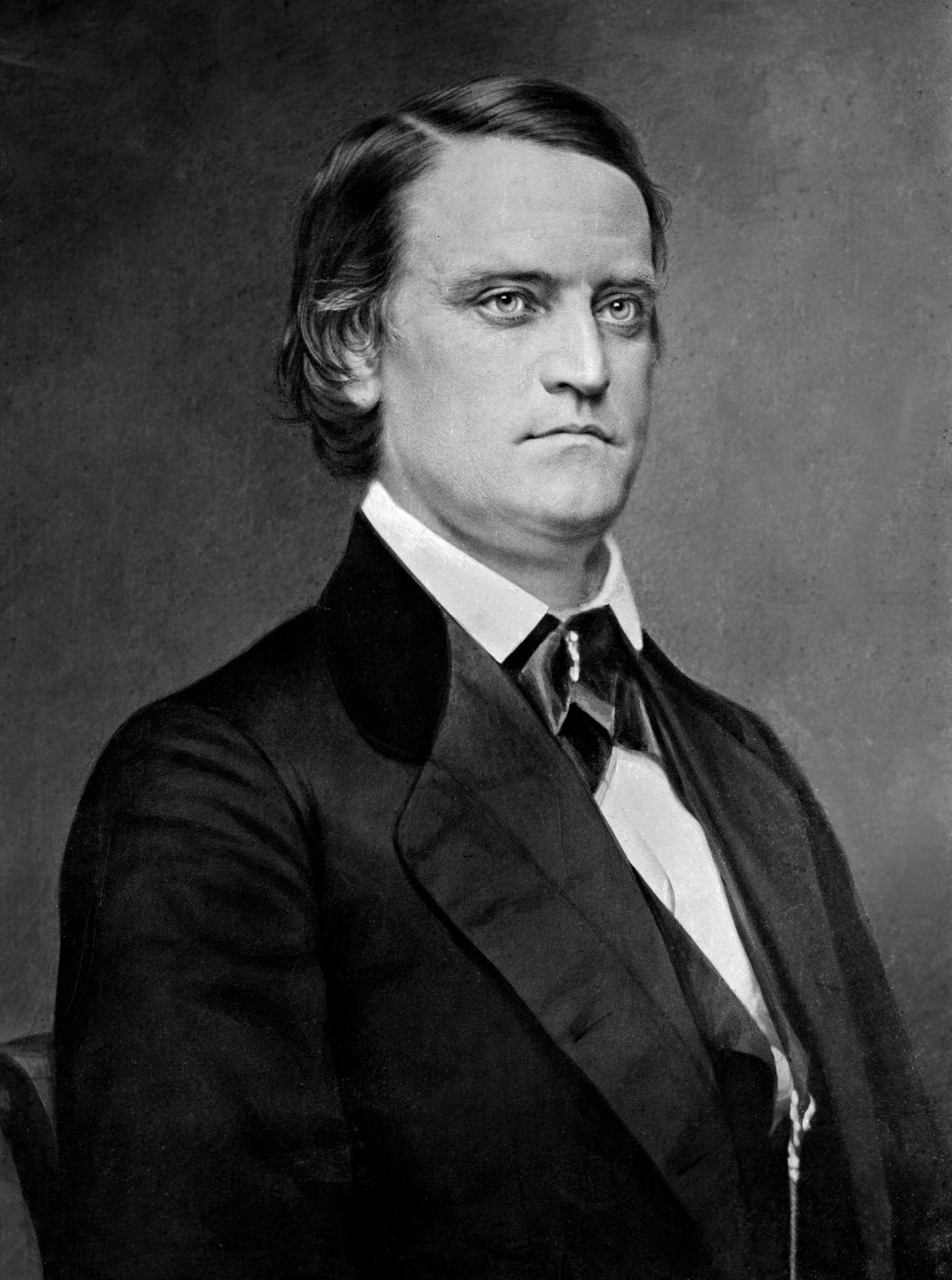
John C. Breckinridge, 1860 Southern Democratic Presidential Nominee

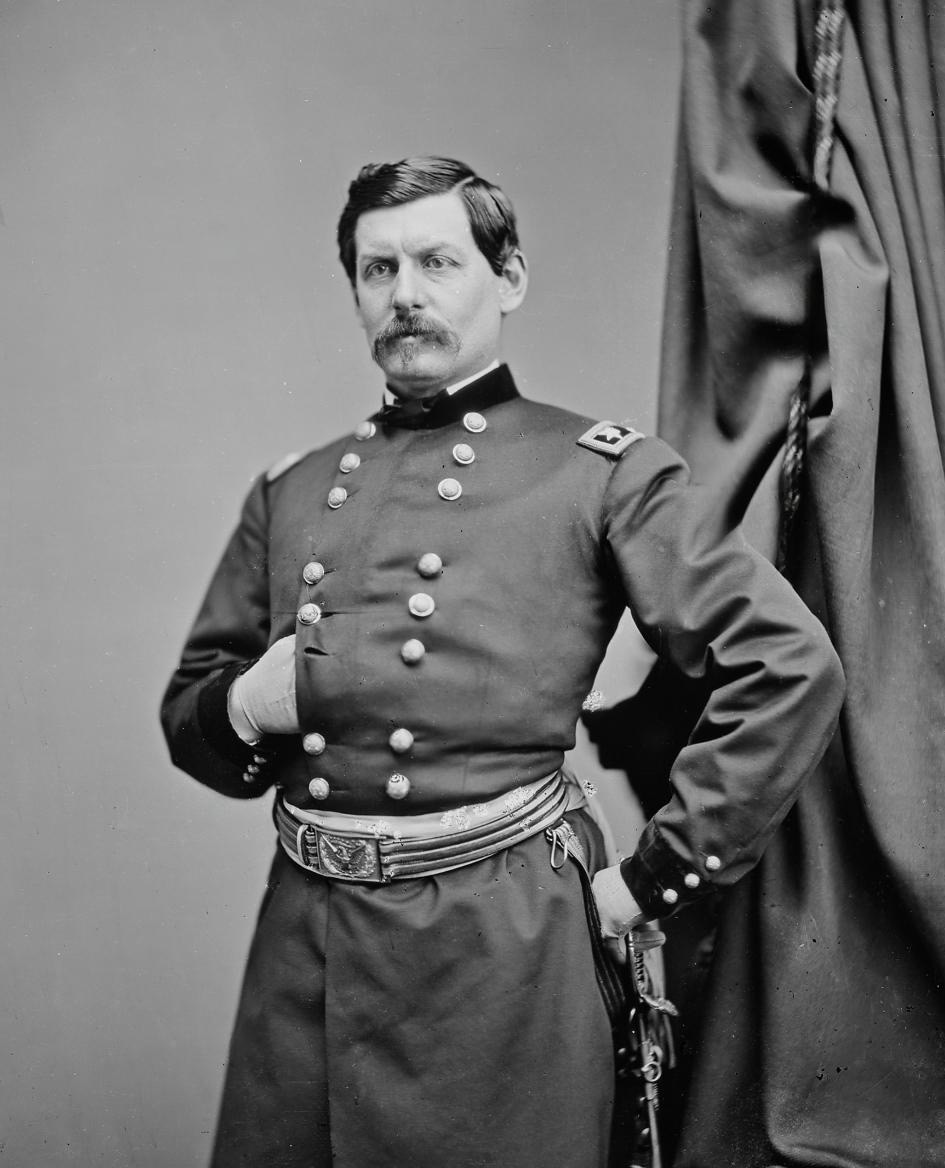
George B. McClellan, 1864 Democratic Presidential Nominee

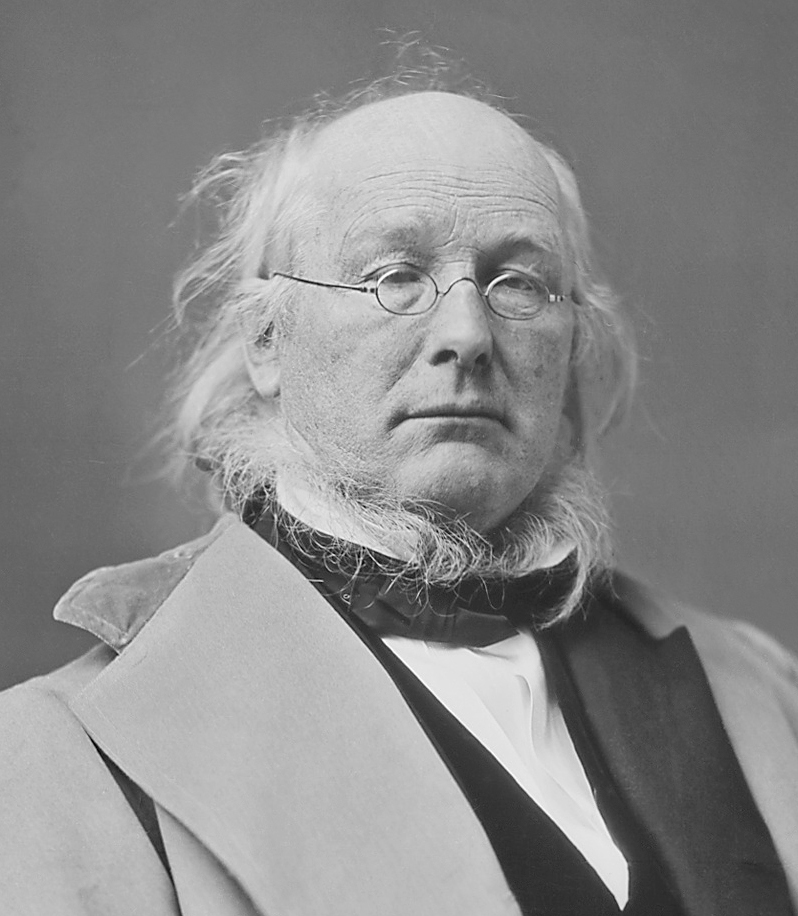
Horace Greeley, 1872 Liberal Republican Presidential Nominee

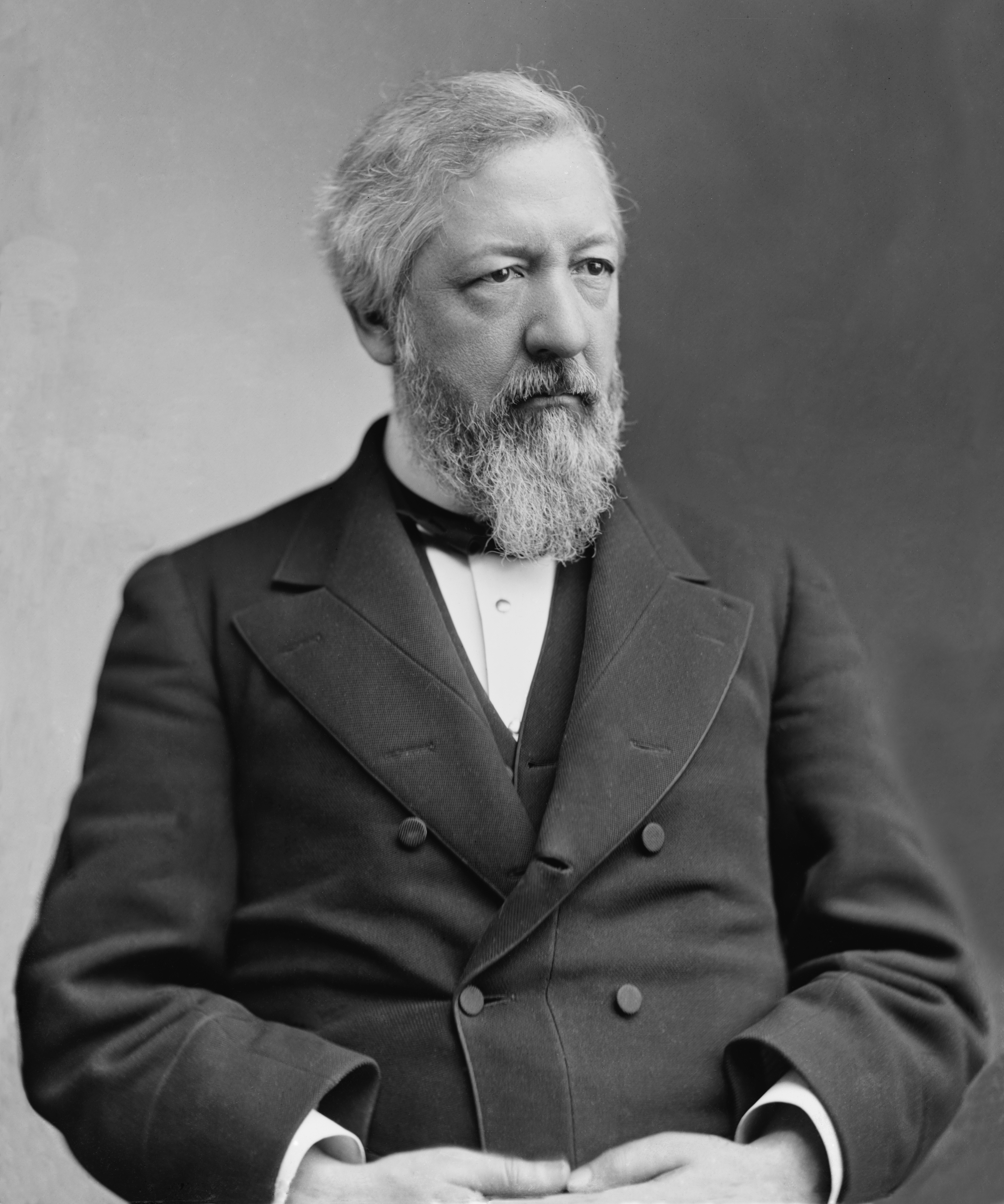
James G. Blaine, 1884 Republican Presidential Nominee

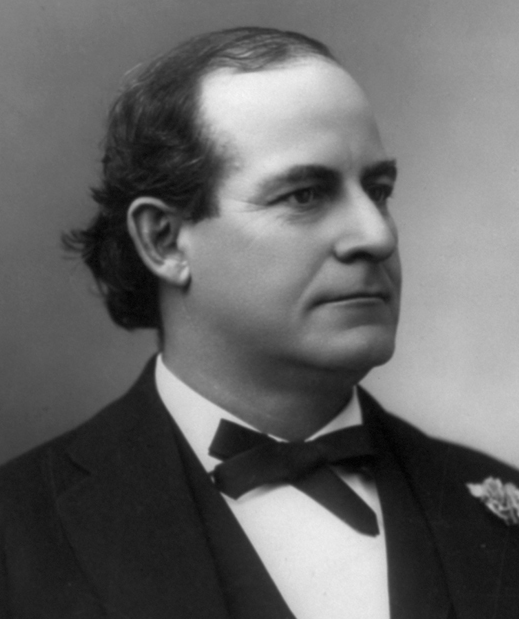
William Jennings Bryan, 1896, 1900, and 1908 Democratic Presidential Nominee

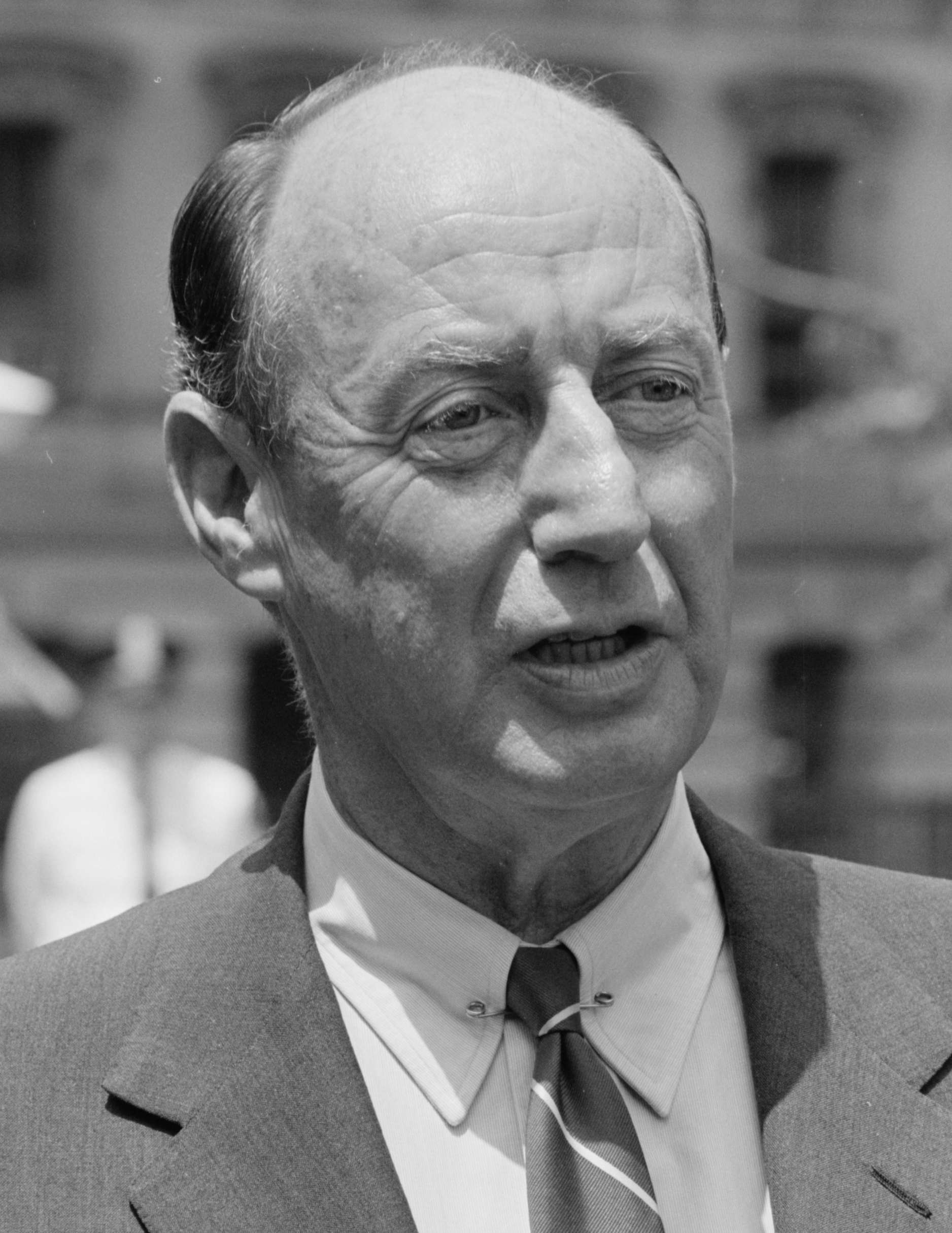
Adlai Stevenson II, 1952 and 1956 Democratic Presidential Nominee

Al Gore, 2000 Democratic Presidential Nominee

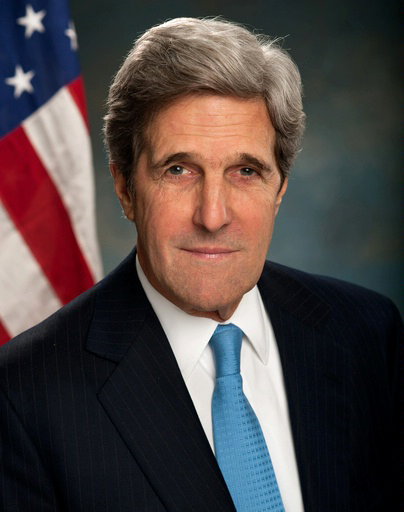
John Kerry, 2004 Democratic Presidential Nominee

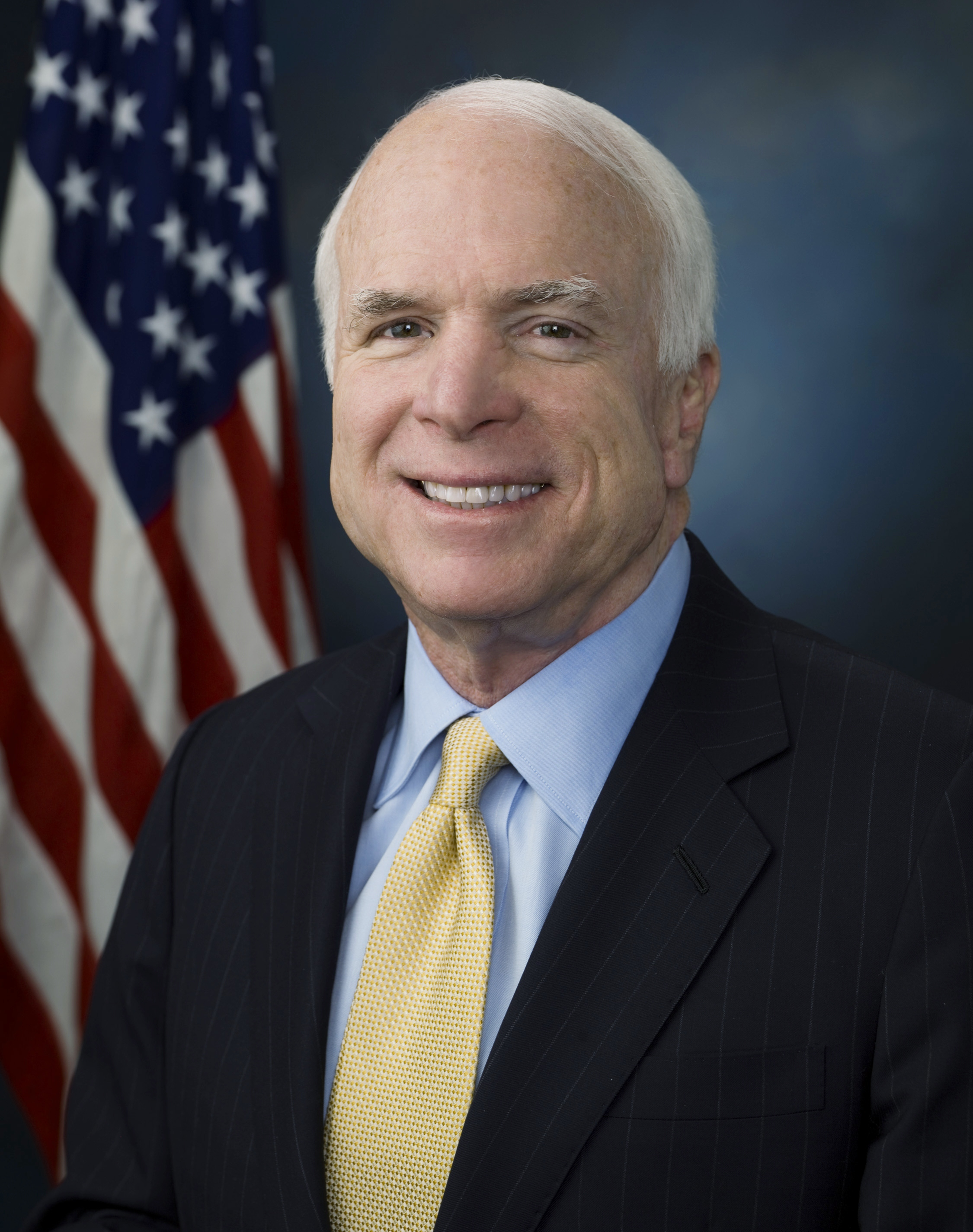
John McCain, 2008 Republican Presidential Nominee

This is a list of notable Scotch-Irish Americans, including both original immigrants who obtained American citizenship and their American descendants. The Scotch-Irish trace their ancestry to Lowland Scottish and Northern English people, but through having stayed a few generations in Ulster. This list is ordered by surname within section. To be included in this list, the person must have a Wikipedia article showing they are Scotch-Irish American or must have references showing they are Scotch-Irish American and are notable.

== Political/military ==
=== U.S. presidents ===
Many Presidents of the United States have ancestral links to Ulster, including three whose parents were born in Ulster. The Irish Protestant vote in the U.S. has not been studied nearly as much as that of the Catholic Irish. In the 1820s and 1830s, supporters of Andrew Jackson emphasized his Irish background, as did James Knox Polk, but since the 1840s it has been uncommon for a Protestant politician in America to be identified as Irish, but rather as 'Scotch-Irish'. In Canada, by contrast, Irish Protestants remained a cohesive political force well into the 20th century, identified with the then Conservative Party of Canada and especially with the Orange Institution, although this is less evident in today's politics.

More than one-third of all U.S. Presidents had substantial ancestral origins in the northern province of Ireland (Ulster). President Bill Clinton spoke proudly of that fact, and his own ancestral links with the province, during his two visits to Ulster. Like most US citizens, most US presidents are the result of a "melting pot" of ancestral origins.

Clinton is one of at least seventeen chief executives descended from emigrants to the United States from Ulster. While many of the presidents have typically Ulster-Scots surnames – Jackson, Johnson, McKinley, Wilson – others, such as Roosevelt and Cleveland, have links which are less obvious.

Andrew Jackson
7th president, 1829–1837: He was born in the predominantly Ulster-Scots Waxhaws area of South Carolina two years after his parents left Boneybefore, near Carrickfergus in County Antrim. A heritage centre in the village pays tribute to the legacy of 'Old Hickory', the People's President. Andrew Jackson then moved to Tennessee, where he began a prominent political and military career. (U.S. Senator from Tennessee, 1797–1798 and 1823–1825; U.S. House Representative from Tennessee's at-large congressional district, 1796–1797; Tennessee Supreme Court Judge, 1798–1804; Federal Military Commissioner of Florida, 1821; U.S. Army Major General, 1814–1821; U.S. Volunteers Major General, 1812–1814; Tennessee State Militia Major General, 1802–1812; Tennessee State Militia Colonel, 1801–1802)
James K. Polk
11th president, 1845–1849: His ancestors were among the first Ulster-Scots settlers, emigrating from Coleraine in 1680 to become a powerful political family in Mecklenburg County, North Carolina. He moved to Tennessee and became its governor before winning the presidency. (13th Speaker of the U.S. House of Representatives, 1835–1839; 9th governor of Tennessee, 1839–1841; U.S. House Representative from Tennessee's 6th congressional district, 1825–1833; U.S. House Representative from Tennessee's 9th congressional district, 1833–1839; Tennessee state representative, 1823–1825)
James Buchanan
15th president, 1857–1861: Born in a log cabin (which has been relocated to his old school in Mercersburg, Pennsylvania), 'Old Buck' cherished his origins: "My Ulster blood is a priceless heritage". His father was born in Ramelton in County Donegal, Ireland. The Buchanans were originally from Stirlingshire, Scotland where the ancestral home still stands. (17th U.S. Secretary of State, 1845–1849; U.S. Senator from Pennsylvania, (1834–1845); U.S. House Representative from Pennsylvania's 3rd congressional district, 1821–1823; U.S. House Representative from Pennsylvania's 4th congressional district, 1823–1831; U.S. Minister to the Russian Empire, 1832–1833; U.S. Minister to the United Kingdom of Great Britain and Ireland, 1853–1856; Pennsylvania state representative, 1814–1816)
Andrew Johnson
17th president, 1865–1869: His grandfather left Mounthill, near Larne in County Antrim around 1750 and settled in North Carolina. Andrew worked there as a tailor and ran a successful business in Greeneville, Tennessee, before being elected Vice President. He became President following Abraham Lincoln's assassination. (16th vice president of the United States, 1865; U.S. Senator from Tennessee, 1857–1862 and 1875; 15th governor of Tennessee, 1853–1857; U.S. House Representative from Tennessee's 1st congressional district, 1843–1853; Tennessee state senator, 1841–1843; Tennessee state representative, 1835–1837 and 1839–1841; Greeneville, Tennessee Mayor, 1834–1838; Greeneville, Tennessee Alderman, 1828–1830; Military Governor of Tennessee, 1862–1865; Union Army Brigadier General, 1862–1865)
Ulysses S. Grant
18th president, 1869–1877: The home of his maternal great-grandfather, John Simpson, at Dergenagh, County Tyrone, is the location for an exhibition on the eventful life of the victorious Civil War commander who served two terms as President. Grant visited his ancestral homeland in 1878. The home of John Simpson still stands in County Tyrone. (Acting U.S. Secretary of War, 1867–1868; Commanding General of the U.S. Army, 1864–1869; U.S./Union Army Lieutenant General, 1864–1866; Union Army Major General, 1862–1864; Union Army Brigadier General, 1861–1862; Union Army Colonel, 1861; U.S. Army Captain, 1853–1854; U.S. Army Brevet Captain, 1847–1848; U.S. Army 2nd Lieutenant, 1843–1853)
Chester A. Arthur
21st president, 1881–1885: His succession to the presidency after the death of Garfield was the start of a quarter-century in which the White House was occupied by men of Ulster-Scots origins. His family left Dreen, near Cullybackey, County Antrim, in 1815. There is now an interpretive centre, alongside the Arthur Ancestral Home, devoted to his life and times. (20th vice president of the United States, 1881; New York Port Collector, 1871–1878; New York Guard Quartermaster General, 1862–1863; New York Guard Inspector General, 1862; New York Guard Engineer-in-Chief, 1861–1863)
Grover Cleveland
22nd and 24th president, 1885–1889 and 1893–1897: Born in New Jersey, he was the maternal grandson of merchant Abner Neal, who emigrated from County Antrim in the 1790s. (28th governor of New York, 1883–1885; 34th Mayor of Buffalo, New York, 1882; Erie County, New York Sheriff, 1871–1873)
Benjamin Harrison
23rd president, 1889–1893: His mother, Elizabeth Irwin, had Ulster-Scots roots through her two great-grandfathers, James Irwin and William McDowell. Harrison was born in Ohio and served as a brigadier general in the Union Army before embarking on a career in Indiana politics which led to the White House. (U.S. Senator from Indiana, 1881–1887; Union Army Brevet Brigadier General, 1865; Union Army Colonel, 1862–1865; Union Army Captain, 1862)
William McKinley
25th president, 1897–1901: Born in Ohio, the descendant of a farmer from Conagher, near Ballymoney, County Antrim, he was proud of his ancestry and addressed one of the national Scotch-Irish congresses held in the late 19th century. His second term as president was cut short by an assassin's bullet. (39th governor of Ohio, 1892–1896; U.S. House Representative from Ohio's 18th congressional district, 1887–1891; U.S. House Representative from Ohio's 20th congressional district, 1885–1887; U.S. House Representative from Ohio's 18th congressional district, 1883–1884; U.S. House Representative from Ohio's 17th congressional district, 1881–1883; U.S. House Representative from Ohio's 16th congressional district, 1879–1881; U.S. House Representative from Ohio's 17th congressional district, 1877–1879; Union Army Brevet Brigadier General, 1865; Union Army Colonel, 1862–1865; Union Army Captain, 1862)
Theodore Roosevelt
26th president, 1901–1909: His mother, Mittie Bulloch, had Ulster Scots ancestors who emigrated from Glenoe, County Antrim, in May 1729. Roosevelt praised "Irish Presbyterians" as "a bold and hardy race". However, he is also the man who said: "But a hyphenated American is not an American at all. This is just as true of the man who puts "native"* before the hyphen as of the man who puts German or Irish or English or French before the hyphen." (*Roosevelt was referring to "nativists", not American Indians, in this context) (25th vice president of the United States, 1901; 33rd governor of New York, 1899–1900; Assistant Secretary of the Navy, 1897–1898; New York City Police Commissioners Board President, 1895–1897; New York State Assembly Minority Leader, 1883; New York State Assembly Member, 1882–1884)
William Howard Taft
27th president, 1909–1913: First known ancestor of the Taft family in the United States, Robert Taft Sr., was born in County Louth circa 1640 (where his father, Richard Robert Taft, also died in 1700), before migrating to Braintree, Massachusetts in 1675, and settling in Mendon, Massachusetts in 1680. (10th Chief Justice of the United States, 1921–1930; 42nd U.S. Secretary of War, 1904–1908; 1st Provisional Governor of Cuba, 1906; 1st governor-general of the Philippines, 1901–1903; U.S. 6th Circuit Court of Appeals Judge, 1892–1900; 6th U.S. Solicitor General, 1890–1892)
Woodrow Wilson
28th president, 1913–1921: Of Ulster-Scot descent on both sides of the family, his roots were very strong and dear to him. He was grandson of James Wilson, a printer from Dergalt, near Strabane, County Tyrone, whose former home is open to visitors. (34th governor of New Jersey, 1911–1913; Princeton University President, 1902–1910)
Harry S. Truman
33rd president, 1945–1953: Of Ulster-Scot descent on both sides of the family. (34th vice president of the United States, 1945; U.S. Senator from Missouri, 1935–1945; Jackson County, Missouri Presiding Judge, 1927–1935; U.S. Army Reserve Colonel, 1932–1953; U.S. Army Reserve Lieutenant Colonel, 1925–1932; U.S. Army Reserve Major, 1920–1925; U.S. Army Major, 1919; U.S. Army Captain, 1918–1919; U.S. Army 1st Lieutenant, 1917–1918; Missouri National Guard Corporal, 1905–1911)
Lyndon B. Johnson
36th president, 1963–1969: Of Ulster-Scot ancestry with patrilineal descent traced to Dumfriesshire, Scotland in 1590. (37th vice president of the United States, 1961–1963; U.S. Senate Majority Leader, 1955–1961; U.S. Senate Minority Leader, 1953–1955; U.S. Senate Majority Whip, 1951–1953; U.S. Senator from Texas, 1949–1961; U.S. House Representative from Texas's 10th congressional district, 1937–1949; U.S. Naval Reserve Commander, 1940–1964)
Richard Nixon
37th president, 1969–1974: The Nixon ancestors left Ulster in the mid-18th century; the Quaker Milhous family ties were with County Antrim and County Kildare. (36th vice president of the United States, 1953–1961; U.S. Senator from California, 1950–1953; U.S. House Representative from California's 12th congressional district, 1947–1950; U.S. Naval Reserve Commander, 1953–1966; U.S. Naval Reserve Lieutenant Commander, 1945–1953; U.S. Naval Reserve Lieutenant, 1943–1945; U.S. Naval Reserve Lieutenant J.G., 1942–1943)
Jimmy Carter
39th president, 1977–1981: Some of Carter's paternal ancestors originated from County Antrim, County Londonderry and County Armagh and some of his maternal ancestors originated from County Londonderry, County Down, and County Donegal. (76th governor of Georgia, 1971–1975; Georgia state senator, 1963–1967; U.S. Navy Reserve Lieutenant J.G., 1953–1961; U.S. Navy Lieutenant J.G., 1949–1953; U.S. Navy Ensign, 1946–1949)
George H. W. Bush
41st president, 1989–1993: Of Ulster-Scot ancestry. (43rd Vice President of the United States, 1981–1989; Director of Central Intelligence, 1976–1977; 2nd U.S. Beijing Liaison Office Chief, 1974–1975; 10th U.S. Ambassador to the United Nations, 1971–1973; U.S. House Representative from Texas's 7th congressional district, 1967–1971; U.S. Navy Lieutenant J.G., 1942–1945)
Bill Clinton
42nd president, 1993–2001: Of Ulster-Scot ancestry. (40th and 42nd governor of Arkansas, 1979–1981 and 1983–1992; 50th Arkansas Attorney General, 1977–1979)
George W. Bush
43rd president, 2001–2009: Of Ulster-Scot ancestry. (46th governor of Texas, 1995–2000)
Barack Obama
44th president, 2009–2017: Of Scotch-Irish ancestry on mother's side. (U.S. Senator from Illinois, 2005–2008; Illinois state senator, 1997–2004)

=== U.S. vice presidents ===
- George Clinton (4th vice president, 1805–1812; 1st governor of New York, 1777–1795 and 1801–1804; Continental Army Brigadier General, 1775–1783; British Army Lieutenant, 1758)
- John C. Calhoun (7th vice president, 1825–1832; 16th U.S. Secretary of State 1844–1845; 10th U.S. Secretary of War 1817–1825; U.S. Senator from South Carolina, 1832–1843 and 1845–1850; U.S. Representative from South Carolina's 6th congressional district, 1811–1817)
- John C. Breckinridge (14th vice president, 1857–1861; U.S. Senator from Kentucky, 1861; U.S. House Representative from Kentucky's 8th congressional district, 1851–1855; Kentucky state representative, 1849–1850; Confederate States Secretary of War, 1865; C.S.A. Major General, 1862–1865; C.S.A. Brigadier General, 1861–1862; U.S. Army Major, 1847–1848; 1860 Southern Democratic Presidential Nominee)
- Adlai Stevenson I (23rd vice president, 1893–1897; First Assistant U.S. Postmaster General, 1885–1889; U.S. Representative from Illinois's 13th congressional district, 1875–1877 and 1879–1881)
- Henry A. Wallace (33rd vice president, 1941–1945; 10th U.S. Secretary of Commerce, 1945–1946; 11th U.S. Secretary of Agriculture, 1933–1940; 1948 Progressive Party Presidential Nominee)
- Alben W. Barkley (35th vice president, 1949–1953; U.S. Senate Majority Leader, 1937–1947; U.S. Senate Minority Leader, 1947–1949; Senate Democratic Caucus Leader, 1937–1949; U.S. Senator from Kentucky, 1927–1949 and 1955–1956; U.S. Representative from Kentucky's 1st congressional district, 1913–1927)
- Nelson Rockefeller (41st vice president, 1974–1977; 49th governor of New York, 1959–1973; 1st Under Secretary of Health, Education, and Welfare, 1953–1954; 1st Assistant Secretary of State for American Republic Affairs, 1944–1945)
- Al Gore (45th vice president, 1993–2001; U.S. Senator from Tennessee, 1985–1993; U.S. Representative from Tennessee's 6th congressional district, 1983–1985; U.S. Representative from Tennessee's 4th congressional district, 1977–1983; 2000 Democratic Presidential Nominee)
- JD Vance (50th vice president, 2025–present; U.S. Senator from Ohio, 2023-2025)

=== Speakers of the U.S. House of Representatives ===
- James G. Blaine (27th speaker of the U.S. House of Representatives, 1869–1875; House Republican Conference Leader, 1869–1875; 28th and 31st U.S. Secretary of State, 1881 and 1889–1892; U.S. Senator from Maine, 1876–1881; U.S. Representative from Maine's 3rd congressional district, 1863–1876; 1884 Republican Presidential Nominee)
- William B. Bankhead (42nd speaker of the U.S. House of Representatives, 1936–1940; House Democratic Caucus Leader, 1936–1940; U.S. House Majority Leader, 1935–1936; U.S. Representative from Alabama's 10th congressional district, 1917–1933; U.S. Representative from Alabama's 7th congressional district, 1933–1940)
- Sam Rayburn (43rd speaker of the U.S. House of Representatives, 1940–1947, 1949–1953, and 1955–1961; House Democratic Caucus Leader, 1940–1961; U.S. House Minority Leader, 1947–1949 and 1953–1955; U.S. Representative from Texas's 4th congressional district, 1913–1961; Speaker of the Texas House of Representatives, 1911–1913; Texas state representative, 1907–1913)
- Newt Gingrich (50th speaker of the U.S. House of Representatives, 1995–1999; House Republican Conference Leader, 1995–1999; House Minority Whip, 1989–1995; U.S. Representative from Georgia's 6th congressional district, 1979–1999)

=== U.S. Supreme Court justices ===
- John Rutledge (2nd Chief Justice of the United States, 1795; Associate Justice of the U.S. Supreme Court, 1789–1791; 31st governor of South Carolina, 1776–1778 and 1779–1782; Continental Congress Delegate from South Carolina, 1774–1776; Stamp Act Congress Delegate, 1765)
- William Paterson (U.S. Supreme Court Associate Justice, 1793–1806; U.S. Senator from New Jersey, 1789–1790; 2nd governor of New Jersey, 1790–1793; New Jersey Attorney General, 1776–1783)
- Samuel Nelson (U.S. Supreme Court Associate Justice, 1845–1872; New York Court of Appeals Chief Judge, 1837–1845; New York Court of Appeals Associate Judge, 1831–1837; New York 6th Circuit Court Judge, 1823–1831)
- John Marshall Harlan (U.S. Supreme Court Associate Justice, 1877–1911; 14th Kentucky Attorney General, 1863–1867)
- Joseph Rucker Lamar (U.S. Supreme Court Associate Justice, 1910–1916; Georgia Supreme Court Judge, 1901–1905; George state representative, 1886–1889)
- James Clark McReynolds (U.S. Supreme Court Associate Justice, 1914–1941; 48th U.S. Attorney General, 1913–1914)
- John Hessin Clarke (U.S. Supreme Court Associate Justice, 1916–1922; U.S. District Court Judge for the Northern District of Ohio, 1914–1916)
- Hugo Black (U.S. Supreme Court Associate Justice, 1937–1971; U.S. Senator from Alabama, 1927–1937)
- Wiley Blount Rutledge (U.S. Supreme Court Associate Justice, 1943–1949; U.S. Court of Appeals Judge for the D.C. Circuit, 1939–1943)
- John Marshall Harlan II (U.S. Supreme Court Associate Justice, 1955–1971; U.S. Court of Appeals Judge for the 2nd Circuit, 1954–1955)

=== U.S. Cabinet ===
- Henry Knox (1st U.S. Secretary of War, 1789–1794; Continental Congress Secretary at War, 1785–1789; Senior Officer of the U.S. Army, 1783–1784; Continental Army Major General, 1782–1783; Continental Army Brigadier General, 1776–1782; Continental Army Colonel, 1775–1776)
- James McHenry (3rd U.S. Secretary of War, 1796–1800; Constitutional Convention Delegate from Maryland, 1787)
- John Breckinridge (5th U.S. Attorney General, 1805–1806; U.S. Senator from Kentucky, 1801–1805; Speaker of the Kentucky House of Representatives, 1799–1800; 2nd Kentucky Attorney General, 1795–1797)
- John Armstrong Jr. (7th U.S. Secretary of War, 1813–1814; U.S. Senator from New York, 1801–1802 and 1803–1804; U.S. Minister to France, 1804–1810; U.S. Army Brigadier General 1812–1813; Continental Army Major, 1782–1783)
- Alexander Hugh Holmes Stuart (3rd U.S. Secretary of the Interior, 1850–1853; U.S. House Representative from Virginia's 17th congressional district, 1841–1843)
- Robert McClelland (4th U.S. Secretary of the Interior, 1853–1857; 9th governor of Michigan, 1852–1853; U.S. House Representative from Michigan's 1st congressional district, 1843–1849)
- John Aaron Rawlins (29th U.S. Secretary of War, 1869)
- Alphonso Taft (34th U.S. Attorney General, 1876–1877; 31st U.S. Secretary of War, 1876; U.S. Minister to Austria-Hungary, 1882–1884; U.S. Minister to Russia, 1884–1885)
- Jacob M. Dickinson (44th U.S. Secretary of War, 1909–1911)
- William Jennings Bryan (41st U.S. Secretary of State, 1913–1915; U.S. House Representative from Nebraska's 1st congressional district, 1891–1895; 1896 Democratic/Populist Presidential Nominee; 1900 and 1908 Democratic Presidential Nominee)
- Andrew Mellon (49th U.S. Secretary of the Treasury, 1921–1932; U.S. Ambassador to the United Kingdom, 1932–1933)
- Frank Polk (Acting U.S. Secretary of State, 1920; U.S. Under Secretary of State, 1919–1920)
- Harry M. Daugherty (51st U.S. Attorney General, 1921–1924)
- Henry Cantwell Wallace (7th U.S. Secretary of Agriculture, 1921–1924)
- William Cohen (20th U.S. Secretary of Defense, 1997–2001; U.S. Senator from Maine, 1979–1997; U.S. House Representative from Maine's 2nd congressional district, 1973–1979)
- John Kerry (68th U.S. Secretary of State, 2013–2017; U.S. Senator from Massachusetts, 1985–2013; 66th lieutenant governor of Massachusetts, 1983–1985; 2004 Democratic Presidential Nominee; U.S. Navy Reserve Lieutenant, 1970–1978; U.S. Navy Lieutenant, 1966–1970)
- Jeff Sessions (84th U.S. Attorney General, 2017–2018; U.S. Senator from Alabama, 1997–2017; 44th Alabama Attorney General; U.S. Attorney for Southern Alabama, 1981–1993)

=== U.S. Senate ===
- Alexander Martin (U.S. Senator from North Carolina, 1793–1799; 4th and 7th governor of North Carolina, 1782–1785 and 1789–1792)
- John E. Colhoun (U.S. Senator from South Carolina, 1801–1802; South Carolina state representative, 1778–1800)
- DeWitt Clinton (U.S. Senator from New York, 1802–1803; 6th governor of New York, 1817–1822 and 1825–1828; Lieutenant Governor of New York, 1811–1813; Mayor of New York City, 1803–1807, 1808–1810 and 1811–1815; 1812 unofficial Federalist Presidential Nominee)
- Jenkin Whiteside (U.S. Senator from Tennessee, 1809–1811)
- Thomas Posey (U.S. Senator from Louisiana, 1812–1813; 2nd governor of the Indiana Territory, 1813–1816; 3rd lieutenant governor of Kentucky, 1806–1808; Kentucky Senate President, 1805–1806; Kentucky state senator, 1804–1806; U.S. Army Brigadier General, 1793–1794; Continental Army Lieutenant Colonel, 1782–1783; Continental Army Major, 1778–1782; Continental Army Captain, 1775–1778)
- William Findlay (U.S. Senator from Pennsylvania, 1821–1827; 4th governor of Pennsylvania, 1817–1820; Pennsylvania Treasurer 1807–1817; Pennsylvania state representative, 1804–1807)
- Jeremiah Morrow (U.S. Senator from Ohio, 1813–1819; 9th governor of Ohio, 1822–1826; U.S. House Representative from Ohio's at-large congressional district, 1803–1813; U.S. House Representative from Ohio's 4th congressional district, 1840–1843; Ohio state senator, 1803)
- Hugh Lawson White (U.S. Senator from Tennessee, 1825–1840; President pro tempore of the United States Senate, 1832–1833; 1836 Whig U.S. Presidential Nominee)
- William Alexander Graham (U.S. Senator from North Carolina, 1840–1843; 30th governor of North Carolina, 1845–1849; 20th U.S. Secretary of the Navy, 1850–1852; 1852 Whig U.S. Vice Presidential Nominee; Confederate States Senator from North Carolina, 1864–1865)
- Sam Houston (U.S. Senator from Texas, 1846–1859; 6th governor of Tennessee, 1827–1829; 1st and 3rd president of the Republic of Texas, 1836–1838 and 1841–1844; 7th governor of Texas 1859–1861; U.S. House Representative from Tennessee's 7th congressional district, 1823–1827; Texas state representative, 1839–1841; Texian Army Major General; U.S. Army 1st Lieutenant)
- Trusten Polk (U.S. Senator from Missouri, 1857–1862; 12th governor of Missouri, 1857; Confederate States Army Colonel)
- James L. Alcorn (U.S. Senator from Mississippi, 1871–1877; 28th governor of Mississippi, 1870–1871; Mississippi state senator, 1848–1854; Mississippi state representative, 1846 and 1856–1857; Kentucky state representative, 1843; C.S.A. Brigadier General)
- John W. Johnston (U.S. Senator from Virginia, 1870–1871 and 1871–1883; Virginia state senator, 1846–1848)
- Mark Hanna (U.S. Senator from Ohio, 1897–1904; chair of the Republican National Committee, 1896–1904)
- William A. Clark (U.S. Senator from Montana, 1899–1900 and 1901–1907; industrialist, banker)
- John H. Bankhead (U.S. Senator from Alabama, 1907–1920; U.S. House Representative from Alabama's 6th congressional district, 1887–1907; Alabama state senator, 1876–1877; Alabama state representative, 1865–1867 and 1880–1881)
- Thomas Gore (U.S. Senator from Oklahoma, 1907–1921 and 1931–1937)
- Joseph M. McCormick (U.S. Senator from Illinois, 1919–1925; U.S. House Representative from Illinois's at-large congressional district, 1917–1919; Illinois state representative, 1913–1917)
- John H. Bankhead II (U.S. Senator from Alabama, 1931–1946)
- Theodore G. Bilbo (U.S. Senator from Mississippi, 1935–1947; 39th and 43rd governor of Mississippi, 1916–1920 and 1928–1932; Lieutenant Governor of Mississippi, 1912–1916; Mississippi state senator, 1908–1912)
- Charles L. McNary (U.S. Senate Minority Leader, 1933–1940 and 1941–1944; U.S. Senator from Oregon, 1917–1918 and 1918–1944; Oregon Supreme Court Associate Justice 1913–1915; 1940 Republican vice presidential nominee)
- Robert A. Taft (U.S. Senate Majority Leader, 1953; U.S. Senator from Ohio, 1939–1953)
- Kingsley A. Taft (U.S. Senator from Ohio, 1946–1947; Ohio Supreme Court Chief Justice, 1963–1970; Ohio Supreme Court Associate Justice, 1949–1962; Ohio state representative, 1933–1934 and 1940)
- Albert Gore Sr. (U.S. Senator from Tennessee, 1953–1971; U.S. House Representative from Tennessee's 4th congressional district, 1939–1953)
- Adlai Stevenson III (U.S. Senator from Illinois, 1970–1981; 63rd Illinois State Treasurer, 1967–1970; U.S. Marine Corps Captain)
- Robert Taft Jr. (U.S. Senator from Ohio, 1971–1976; U.S. House Representative from Ohio's 1st congressional district, 1967–1971; U.S. House Representative from Ohio's at-large congressional district, 1963–1965; Ohio state representative, 1955–1962)
- Birch Bayh (U.S. Senator from Indiana, 1963–1981; Speakers of the Indiana House of Representatives, 1958–1960; Indiana state representative, 1954–1962)
- Mitch McConnell ( U.S. Senate Minority Leader, 2021–present; U.S. Senate Majority Leader, 2015–2021; U.S. Senator from Kentucky, 1985–present; U.S. Senate Minority Leader, 2007–2015; U.S. Senate Majority Whip, 2003–2007)
- Jay Rockefeller (U.S. Senator from West Virginia, 1985–2015; 29th governor of West Virginia, 1977–1985; 22nd West Virginia Secretary of State, 1969–1973; West Virginia House Delegate, 1966–1968)
- John McCain (U.S. Senator from Arizona, 1987–2018; U.S. House Representative from Arizona's 1st congressional district, 1983–1987; 2008 Republican Presidential Nominee; U.S. Navy Captain, 1979–1981; U.S. Navy Commander, 1973–1979; U.S. Navy Lieutenant Commander, 1967–1973; U.S. Navy Lieutenant, 1962–1967; U.S. Navy Lieutenant J.G., 1959–1962; U.S. Navy Ensign, 1958–1959)
- Evan Bayh (U.S. Senator from Indiana, 1999–2011; 46th governor of Indiana, 1989–1997; 56th Secretary of State of Indiana, 1986–1989)
- Lamar Alexander (U.S. Senator from Tennessee, 2003–2021; 5th U.S. Secretary of Education, 1991–1993; 45th governor of Tennessee, 1979–1987; chair of the National Governors Association, 1985–1986)
- Lindsey Graham (U.S. Senator from South Carolina, 2003–present; U.S. House Representative from South Carolina's 3rd congressional district, 1995–2003; South Carolina state representative, 1993–1995; U.S. Air Force Reserve Command Colonel, 2004–2015; U.S. Air Force Reserve Command Lieutenant Colonel 1998–2004)
- Jim Webb (U.S. Senator from Virginia, 2007–2013; 66th U.S. Secretary of the Navy, 1987–1988; Assistant Secretary of Defense for Reserve Affairs, 1984–1987; U.S. Marine Corps 1st Lieutenant)
- Rob Portman (U.S. Senator from Ohio, 2011–present; Director of the Office of Management and Budget, 2006–2007; U.S. Trade Representative, 2005–2006; U.S. Representative from Ohio's 2nd congressional district, 1993–2005)

=== Governors ===
- John McKinly (1st governor of Delaware, 1777)
- George Bryan (2nd president of Pennsylvania, 1778; 1st vice-president of Pennsylvania, 1777–1779)
- Joseph Reed (3rd president of Pennsylvania, 1778–1781; Continental Congress Delegate, 1775–1778)
- Thomas McKean (2nd president of Delaware, 1777; 2nd governor of Pennsylvania, 1799–1808; President of the Continental Congress, 1781; Continental Congress Delegate, 1774–1776 and 1777–1783; Chief Justice of the Pennsylvania Supreme Court, 1777–1799; U.S. Constitutional Convention Delegate, 1787; U.S. Declaration of Independence Signer)
- George Mathews (17th and 21st governor of Georgia, 1787–1788 and 1793–1796; U.S. House Representative from Georgia's 3rd congressional district, 1789–1791; First Virginia Convention Delegate, 1774; Continental Army Brigadier General)
- Edward Rutledge (39th governor of South Carolina, 1798–1800; Continental Congress Delegate from South Carolina, 1774–1776; South Carolina state senator, 1796–1798; South Carolina state representative, 1776–1778 and 1783–1796; Continental Army Captain)
- Archibald Roane (2nd governor of Tennessee, 1801–1803)
- Andrew Pickens (46th governor of South Carolina, 1816–1818; U.S. Army lieutenant colonel)
- Alexander McNair (1st governor of Missouri, 1820–1824)
- Charles Polk Jr. (27th and 30th governor of Delaware, 1827–1830 and 1836–1837; Delaware state senator, 1825–1827 and 1835–1843; Delaware state representative, 1814–1816, 1818–1819, and 1824–1825)
- Robert P. Dunlap (11th governor of Maine, 1834–1838; U.S. House Representative from Maine's 2nd congressional district, 1843–1847; Maine state senator, 1831–1833 and 1824–1828; Maine Senate President, 1827–1828)
- David R. Porter (9th governor of Pennsylvania, 1839–1845; Pennsylvania state representative, 1836)
- William F. Johnston (11th governor of Pennsylvania, 1848–1852)
- William Trousdale (13th governor of Tennessee, 1849–1851; U.S. Minister to Brazil, 1853–1857; U.S. Army brigadier general, 1848; U.S. Army Colonel, 1836–1848; U.S. Army Lieutenant, 1812–1836)
- William B. Campbell (14th governor of Tennessee, 1851–1853; U.S. House Representative from Tennessee's 6th congressional district, 1837–1843; U.S. House Representative from Tennessee's 5th congressional district, 1866–1867; U.S. Army Brigadier General)
- Beriah Magoffin (21st governor of Kentucky, 1859–1862; Kentucky state senator, 1850; Kentucky state representative, 1867–1869)
- Hamilton Rowan Gamble (16th governor of Missouri, 1861–1864; Missouri Secretary of State, 1824–1826)
- John W. Geary (16th governor of Pennsylvania, 1867–1873; 3rd Territorial Governor of Kansas, 1856–1857; 1st Mayor of San Francisco, 1850–1851)
- Edward M. McCook (5th and 7th governor of the Colorado Territory, 1869–1873 and 1874–1875; U.S. Minister to Hawaii, 1866–1868; Union Army Brevet Major General, 1865; Union Army Brigadier General, 1864–1865; Union Army Colonel, 1862–1864; Union Army Captain, 1861–1862)
- P. B. S. Pinchback (24th governor of Louisiana, 1872–1873; 12th lieutenant governor of Louisiana, 1871–1872)
- Edwin Stanton McCook (Acting Governor of the Dakota Territory, 1873; Union Army Brevet Major General; Union Army Brevet Brigadier General; Union Army Colonel)
- Charles Croswell (17th governor of Michigan, 1877–1881; Michigan state senator 1862, 1864, and 1866)
- Henry M. Mathews (5th governor of West Virginia, 1877–1881; 7th Attorney General of West Virginia, 1873–1877; West Virginia state senator, 1865; Confederate States Army Major)
- George B. McClellan (24th governor of New Jersey, 1878–1881; Commanding General of the Union Army, 1861–1862; Union Army Major General, 1861–1864; U.S. Army Captain, 1855–1861; U.S. Army 1st Lieutenant, 1853–1855; U.S. Army 2nd Lieutenant, 1847–1853; 1864 Democratic U.S. Presidential Nominee)
- Andrew Ryan McGill (10th governor of Minnesota, 1887–1889)
- Royal C. Taft (39th governor of Rhode Island, 1888–1889; Rhode Island state representative, 1880–1884)
- James E. Boyd (7th governor of Nebraska, 1891, 1892–1893; Nebraska state representative, 1866)
- John P. Buchanan (25th governor of Tennessee, 1891–1893)
- William S. Taylor (33rd governor of Kentucky, 1899–1900; 19th attorney general of Kentucky, 1896–1899)
- Andrew H. Longino (35th governor of Mississippi, 1900–1904; Mississippi state senator, 1880–1884)
- Paul V. McNutt (34th governor of Indiana, 1933–1937; U.S. Ambassador to the Philippines, 1946–1947; Federal Security Agency Administrator, 1939–1945; National Governors Association Chair, 1934–1936)
- Adlai Stevenson II (31st governor of Illinois, 1949–1953; 5th U.S. Ambassador to the United Nations, 1961–1965; 1952 and 1956 Democratic U.S. Presidential Nominee)
- Winthrop Rockefeller (37th governor of Arkansas, 1967–1971; U.S. Army lieutenant colonel)
- Mike Huckabee (44th governor of Arkansas, 1996–2007; chair of the National Governors Association, 2005–2006; 16th lieutenant governor of Arkansas, 1993–1996)
- Bob Taft (67th governor of Ohio, 1999–2007; 49th secretary of state, 1991–1999; Ohio state representative, 1977–1980)

=== U.S. House Representatives ===
- James Gordon (U.S. House Representative from New York's 6th congressional district, 1791–1793; U.S. House Representative from New York's 9th congressional district, 1793–1795)
- James Armstrong (U.S. House Representative from Pennsylvania's at-large congressional district, 1793–1795)
- William Armstrong (U.S. House Representative from Virginia's 16th congressional district, 1825–1833)
- William Irvine (U.S. House Representative from Pennsylvania's at-large congressional district, 1793–1795; Continental Congress Delegate from Pennsylvania, 1787–1788; Continental Army Brigadier General)
- Andrew Pickens (U.S. House Representative from South Carolina's 6th congressional district, 1793–1795; Continental Army Brigadier General)
- John Rhea (U.S. House Representative from Tennessee's 1st congressional district, 1813–1815 and 1817–1823; U.S. House Representative from Tennessee's at-large congressional district, 1803–1813)
- George Clinton Jr. (U.S. House Representative from New York's 2nd congressional district, 1805–1809; U.S. House Representative from New York's 3rd congressional district, 1805)
- Joseph Calhoun (U.S. House Representative from South Carolina's 6th congressional district, 1807–1811; South Carolina state representative, 1804–1805)
- James Breckinridge (U.S. House Representative from Virginia's 5th congressional district, 1809–1817; Virginia State Delegate, 1789–1790, 1796–1801, 1806–1807, 1819–1820, and 1823; U.S. Army Brigadier General)
- James D. Breckinridge (U.S. House Representative from Kentucky's 8th congressional district, 1821–1823)
- Alexander Smyth (U.S. House Representative from Virginia's 22nd congressional district, 1827–1830; U.S. House Representative from Virginia's 22nd congressional district, 1823–1825; U.S. House Representative from Virginia's 6th congressional district, 1817–1823)
- Davy Crockett (U.S. House Representative from Tennessee's 9th congressional district, 1827–1831; U.S. House Representative from Tennessee's 12th congressional district, 1833–1835; frontiersman)
- James Harper (U.S. House Representative from Tennessee's 9th congressional district, 1833–1837)
- James Graham (U.S. House Representative from North Carolina's 12th congressional district, 1833–1843; U.S. House Representative from North Carolina's 1st congressional district, 1845–1847)
- James Harlan (U.S. House Representative from Kentucky's 5th congressional district, 1835–1839; 26th Kentucky Secretary of State, 1840–1844; 12th Kentucky Attorney General, 1849–1859)
- Archibald Stuart (U.S. House Representative from Virginia's 7th congressional district, 1837–1839; Virginia state senator, 1852–1855)
- Horace Greeley (U.S. House Representative from New York's 6th congressional district, 1848–1849; 1872 Liberal Republican Presidential Nominee)
- Thompson Campbell (U.S. House Representative from Illinois's 6th congressional district, 1851–1853; Illinois Secretary of State, 1843–1846)
- William Hawkins Polk (U.S. House Representative from Tennessee's 6th congressional district, 1851–1853; U.S. Minister to the Two Sicilies, 1845–1847; Tennessee state representative, 1841–1845)
- William M. Tweed (U.S. House Representative from New York's 5th congressional district, 1853–1855; New York state senator, 1868–1873; Grand Sachem of Tammany Hall, 1858–1871)
- James S. Rollins (U.S. House Representative from Missouri's 2nd congressional district, 1861–1863; U.S. House Representative from Missouri's 9th congressional district, 1863–1865; Missouri state representative, 1838, 1840, and 1854; "Father of the University of Missouri")
- Alexander Wilson Taylor (U.S. House Representative from Pennsylvania's 21st congressional district, 1873–1875)
- Harry White (U.S. House Representative from Pennsylvania's 25th congressional district, 1877–1881)
- Anson G. McCook (U.S. House of Representative from New York's 8th congressional district, 1877–1883; Union Army Brevet Brigadier General; Union Army Major; Union Army Captain)
- Henry L. Muldrow (U.S. House Representative from Mississippi's 1st congressional district, 1877–1885; 1st Assistant Secretary of the Interior, 1885–1889)
- Clifton R. Breckinridge (U.S. House Representative from Arkansas's 2nd congressional district, 1885–1894; U.S. House Representative from Arkansas's at-large congressional district, 1883–1885)
- William C. P. Breckinridge (U.S. House Representative from Kentucky's 7th congressional district, 1885–1895; C.S.A. Colonel; C.S.A. Captain)
- John M. Wiley (U.S. House Representative from New York's 33rd congressional district, 1889–1891; New York State Assemblyman, 1871–1872)
- David Archibald Harvey (U.S. House Delegate from Oklahoma Territory's at-large congressional district, 1890–1893)
- Charles Phelps Taft (U.S. House Representative from Ohio's 1st congressional district, 1895–1897)
- George B. McClellan Jr. (U.S. House Representative from New York's 12th congressional district, 1895–1903; 93rd Mayor of New York City, 1904–1909)
- L. Irving Handy (U.S. House Representative from Delaware's at-large congressional district, 1897–1899)
- George Henry White (U.S. House Representative from North Carolina's 2nd congressional district, 1897–1901)
- Rufus King Polk (U.S. House Representative from Pennsylvania's 17th congressional district, 1899–1902)
- Ruth Hanna McCormick (U.S. House Representative from Illinois's at-large congressional district, 1929–1931)
- Helen Gahagan Douglas (U.S. House Representative from California's 14th congressional district, 1945–1951)
- John Dingell (U.S. House Representative from Michigan's 15th congressional district, 1955–1965; U.S. House Representative from Michigan's 16th congressional district, 1965–2003; U.S. House Representative from Michigan's 15th congressional district, 2003–2013; U.S. House Representative from Michigan's 12th congressional district, 2013–2015)
- Mike McCormack (U.S. House Representative from Washington's 4th congressional district, 1971–1981; Washington state senator, 1961–1970; Washington state representative, 1957–1961)
- John B. Breckinridge (U.S. House Representative from Kentucky's 6th congressional district, 1973–1979; 38th and 40 Kentucky Attorney General, 1960–1964 and 1968–1972; Kentucky state representative, 1956–1960)
- Rob Andrews (U.S. House Representative from New Jersey's 1st congressional district, 1990–2014)
- Gwen Graham (U.S. House Representative from Florida's 2nd congressional district, 2015–2017)
- Charlie Crist (U.S. House Representative from Florida's 13th congressional district, 2017–present; 44th governor of Florida, 2007–2011; 35th Attorney General of Florida, 2003–2007; 19th Florida Education Commissioner, 2001–2003; Florida state senator, 1992–1998)

=== U.S. military officers ===
- John Armstrong Sr. (Pennsylvania State Militia Major General; Continental Army Brigadier General, 1776–1777; British Army Colonel, 1758–1763; Continental Congress Delegate from Pennsylvania, 1779–1780)
- Nathan Bedford Forrest (C.S.A. Lieutenant General, 1864–1865; C.S.A. Major General, 1863–1864; C.S.A. Brigadier General, 1862–1863; C.S.A. Colonel, 1862; C.S.A. Lieutenant Colonel, 1861–1862)
- Cabell Breckinridge (Secretary of State of Kentucky, 1820–1823; Speaker of the Kentucky House of Representatives, 1817–1819; Kentucky state representative, 1816–1819; U.S. Army Major, 1812–1814)
- Joseph Cabell Breckinridge Sr. (U.S. Army Major General, 1898–1903; U.S. Army Brigadier General, 1889–1898; U.S. Army Colonel, 1885–1889; U.S. Army Lieutenant Colonel, 1885; U.S. Army Major, 1881–1885; U.S. Army Captain, 1874–1881; Union Army Brevet Major, 1865; U.S./Union Army 1st Lieutenant, 1863–1874; Union Army 2nd Lieutenant, 1862–1863)
- Charles Clinton (New York Colonial Militia Colonel, 1756)
- James Clinton (Continental Army Brevet Major General; Continental Army Brigadier General, 1776–1783; Continental Army, Colonel, 1775–1776; British Army Captain, 1759–1763; British Army Ensign, 1757–1759)
- William Crawford (Continental Army Colonel)
- Samuel Dale (U.S. Army Brigadier General)
- John Dunlap (U.S. Army Major, 1794)
- James Ewing (Pennsylvania State Militia Brigadier General)
- David Farragut (U.S. Navy Admiral, 1866–1870; U.S./Union Navy Vice Admiral 1864–1866; Union Navy Rear Admiral, 1862–1864; U.S./Union Navy Captain 1855–1862; U.S. Navy Commander, 1841–1855; U.S. Navy Lieutenant, 1822–1841; U.S. Navy Midshipman, 1810–1822)
- William Gamble (U.S./Union Army Brigadier General, 1864–1866; Union Army Colonel, 1862–1864; Union Army Lieutenant Colonel, 1861–1862)
- Thomas Gaddis (Virginia State Militia Major)
- Daniel Harvey Hill (C.S.A. Brevet Lieutenant General, 1863; C.S.A. Major General, 1862–1863; C.S.A. Brigadier General, 1861–1862; C.S.A. Colonel, 1861; U.S. Army Brevet Major, 1847; U.S. Army Brevet Captain, 1847–1849; U.S. Army 1st Lieutenant, 1842–1847)
- Stonewall Jackson (C.S.A. Lieutenant General, 1862–1863; C.S.A. Major General, 1861–1862; C.S.A. Brigadier General, 1861; C.S.A. Colonel, 1861; U.S. Army Brevet Major, 1847; U.S. Army Brevet Captain, 1847; U.S. Army 1st Lieutenant, 1847; U.S. Army 2nd Lieutenant, 1846–1847)
- Robert Jefferson Breckinridge Jr. (C.S.A. Colonel)
- John J. Kennedy (C.S.A. Captain, 1861–1865; U.S. Army 1st Lieutenant, 1832–1836)
- Richard King Mellon (U.S. Army Reserve Lieutenant General)
- Robert Latimer McCook (Union Army Brigadier General, 1862; Union Army Colonel, 1861–1862)
- Andrew Lewis (Continental Army Brigadier General, 1776–1777; Virginia State Militia Major, 1755–1763; Virginia State Militia Captain, 1754–1755)
- John Mathews (Virginia Colonial Militia Captain)
- Sampson Mathews (Virginia State Militia Lieutenant Colonel; Virginia Colonial Militia Captain)
- William Maxwell (Continental Army Brigadier General, 1776–1780; New Jersey State Militia Colonel, 1775–1776)
- John S. McCain Sr. (U.S. Navy Admiral, 1945; U.S. Navy Vice Admiral, 1943–1945; U.S. Navy Rear Admiral, 1941–1943)
- John S. McCain Jr. (U.S. Navy Admiral, 1967–1972; U.S. Navy Vice Admiral, 1963–1967; U.S. Navy Rear Admiral, 1958–1963; U.S. Navy Captain, 1950–1958; U.S. Navy Commander, 1944–1950; U.S. Navy Lieutenant Commander, 1941–1944; U.S. Navy Ensign, 1931)
- Bruce McCandless (U.S. Navy Rear Admiral, 1952; U.S. Navy Commander, 1942–1952)
- Bruce McCandless II (U.S. Navy Captain)
- Byron McCandless (U.S. Navy Rear Admiral)
- Samuel McClellan (Connecticut State Militia Brigadier General, 1779; Connecticut State Militia Colonel, 1777–1779; Connecticut State Militia Lieutenant Colonel, 1776–1777; Connecticut State Militia Major, 1775–1776; British Army Lieutenant; British Army Ensign)
- John B. McClelland (Continental Army Captain)
- John McClelland (U.S. Army Ensign)
- Daniel McCook (Union Army Major, 1861–1863)
- Daniel McCook Jr. (Union Army Brigadier General, 1862–1864; Union Army Colonel, 1862–1864; Union Army Captain, 1861–1862)
- Robert R. McCormick (U.S. Army Colonel, 1918; U.S. Army Lieutenant Colonel, 1918; U.S. Army Major, 1916–1918)
- John P. McCown (C.S.A. Major General, 1862–1865; C.S.A. Brigadier General, 1861–1862; C.S.A. Colonel, 1861; C.S.A. Lieutenant Colonel, 1861; U.S. Army Captain, 1851–1861; U.S. Army Brevet Captain, 1847; U.S. Army 1st Lieutenant, 1843–1851; U.S. Army 2nd Lieutenant, 1840–1843)
- Benjamin McCulloch (C.S.A. Brigadier General, 1861–1862; C.S.A. Colonel, 1861; U.S. Army Major, 1846–1847; Texas State Militia Major General, 1846–1847; Texas state representative, 1839; Texian Army 1st Lieutenant, 1836)
- Alexander McDowell McCook (U.S. Army Major General, 1894–1895; U.S. Army Brigadier General, 1890–1894; U.S. Army Lieutenant Colonel, 1867–?; Union Army Brevet Major General, 1862–1865; Union Army Brevet Brigadier General, 1861–1862; Union Army Colonel, 1861)
- Samuel McDowell (Continental Army Colonel; British Army Captain)
- Thomas McInerney (U.S. Air Force Lieutenant General)
- James W. McLaughlin (Union Army Lieutenant)
- H. R. McMaster (26th U.S. National Security Advisor, 2017–2018; U.S. Army Lieutenant General, 2017; U.S. Army Major General, 2014–2017; U.S. Army Brigadier General, 2012–2014; U.S. Army Brigadier General, 2009–2012; U.S. Army Colonel; U.S. Army Lieutenant Colonel; U.S. Army Captain, 1990–1991; U.S. Army Captain, 1990–1991; U.S. Army 2nd Lieutenant, 1984–?)
- Hector McNeill (Continental Navy Captain, 1776–1778)
- Richard Montgomery (Continental Army Major General, 1775; Continental Army Brigadier General, 1775; British Army Captain, 1762–1772; British Army Lieutenant, 1758–1762)
- Thomas Z. Morrow (Kentucky state senator, 1865–1866; Union Army Lieutenant Colonel, 1862–1863; Kentucky state representative, 1861–1863)
- Audie Murphy (U.S. Army First Lieutenant, 1945; Texas Army National Guard Major, 1956)
- Arthur Noble (Massachusetts Bay Colonial Militia Lieutenant Colonel, 1744–1747)
- Mason Patrick (U.S. Army Major General, 1927; U.S. Army Brevet Major General, 1918–1921; U.S. Army Brevet Brigadier General, 1917–1918; U.S. Army Colonel, 1916–1921; U.S. Army Lieutenant Colonel, 1910–1916; U.S. Army Major, 1904–1910; U.S. Army Captain, 1898–1904; U.S. Army 1st Lieutenant, 1889–1898; U.S. Army 2nd Lieutenant, 1886–1889)
- George S. Patton Sr. (C.S.A. Colonel; U.S. Army Captain)
- George S. Patton (U.S. Army General, 1945; U.S. Army Lieutenant General, 1944–1945; U.S. Army Major General, 1944; U.S. Army Brigadier General, 1944; U.S. Army Lieutenant General, 1943–1944; U.S. Army Major General, 1941–1943; U.S. Army Brigadier General, 1940–1941; U.S. Army Colonel, 1938–1940; U.S. Army Lieutenant Colonel, 1934–1938; U.S. Army Major, 1920–1934; U.S. Army Colonel, 1918–1920; U.S. Army Lieutenant Colonel, 1918; U.S. Army Major, 1918; U.S. Army Captain, 1917–1918; U.S. Army 1st Lieutenant, 1916–1917; U.S. Army 2nd Lieutenant, 1909–1916)
- George Patton IV (U.S. Army Major General, 1975–1980; U.S. Army Brigadier General, 1970–1975; U.S. Army Colonel, 1968–1970; U.S. Army Lieutenant Colonel, c. 1962–1968)
- Waller T. Patton (C.S.A. Lieutenant Colonel, 1862–1863; C.S.A. Major, 1861–1862)
- Leonidas Polk (C.S.A. Lieutenant General, 1862–1864; C.S.A. Major General, 1861–1862; U.S. Army Brevet 2nd Lieutenant, 1827)
- Thomas Polk (Continental Army Brigadier General, 1780–1781; North Carolina State Militia Colonel, 1775–1778)
- William Polk (North Carolina state representative, 1785–1786 and 1787–1788; Continental Army Lieutenant Colonel, 1781; Continental Army Major, 1776–1781; Continental Army 2nd Lieutenant, 1775–1776)
- James Potter (Pennsylvania State Militia Brigadier General)
- Bowes Reed (Continental Army Colonel, 1776–1778; Continental Army Lieutenant Colonel, 1776)
- Archibald Roosevelt (U.S. Army Lieutenant Colonel, 1943–1945; U.S. Army Captain, ?–1918)
- Quentin Roosevelt (U.S. Army 2nd Lieutenant, 1917–1918)
- Griffith Rutherford (North Carolina State Militia Brigadier General, 1776–1783; North Carolina State Militia Colonel, 1775–1776; North Carolina State Militia Colonel, 1772–1775; North Carolina Colonial Militia Captain, 1760–1772)
- James Smith (Continental Congress Delegate from Pennsylvania, 1775–1776; U.S. Declaration of Independence Signer; Pennsylvania State Militia Brigadier General; Pennsylvania state representative, 1780)
- John Stark (Continental Army Major General; Continental Army Brigadier General, 1777–1783; Continental Army Colonel, 1775–1777; British Army Captain)
- Walter Stewart (Pennsylvania National Guard Major General; Continental Army Brevet Brigadier General, 1783; Continental Army Major, 1776–1783; Continental Army Captain, 1776)
- J. E. B. Stuart (C.S.A. Major General, 1862–1864; C.S.A. Brigadier General, 1861–1862; C.S.A. Colonel, 1861; C.S.A. Lieutenant Colonel, 1861; U.S. Army Captain, 1861; U.S. Army 1st Lieutenant, 1855–1861; U.S. Army 2nd Lieutenant, 1854–1855)
- Matthew Thornton (Continental Congress Delegate from New Hampshire, 1776–1777; New Hampshire state senator, 1784–1787; New Hampshire state representative, 1783 and 1786; New Hampshire Superior Court Judge, 1776–1782; Speaker of the New Hampshire House of Representatives, 1776; New Hampshire Provincial Congress President, 1775; New Hampshire Provincial Assemblyman, 1758–1762; New Hampshire Militia Colonel, 1775–1779; U.S. Declaration of Independence Signer)
- James White (North Carolina State Militia Brigadier General, 1790–1814; North Carolina State Militia Captain, 1779–1781)
- George Wythe McCook (Union Army Brevet Brigadier General, 1865; Union Army Colonel, 1864–1865; Union Army Lieutenant Colonel, 1861–1864)

=== Others ===
- James G. Birney (1840 and 1844 Liberty Party Presidential Nominee; Alabama state representative, 1819–1821; Kentucky state representative, 1817–1819)
- George W. Clinton (U.S. Attorney for Northern New York, 1847–1850; 12th Mayor of Buffalo, New York, 1842–1843)
- Samuel Ealy Johnson Jr. (Texas state representative, 1905–1909 and 1918–1923)
- James Logan (Chief Justice of Pennsylvania, 1731–1739; Mayor of Philadelphia, 1722–1723)
- Francis Makemie (Presbyterian minister)
- George S. Patton Jr. (Mayor of San Marino, California, 1913–1922 and 1922–1924; Los Angeles County District Attorney, 1886–1887)
- Winthrop Paul Rockefeller (17th lieutenant governor of Arkansas, 1996–2006)
- George Taylor (Pennsylvania Provincial Assemblyman, 1763–1769 and 1775–1777; Continental Congress Delegate from Pennsylvania, 1776–1777; U.S. Declaration of Independence Signer)
- Charles Thomson (Secretary of the Continental Congress, 1774–1789)
- Timothy Murphy (American Revolutionary War marksman)

== Entertainment ==
- Karen Allen (actress), of English, Irish, Scottish, and Welsh descent
- Billie Joe Armstrong (singer, actor, musician, record producer and songwriter)
- Mary Astor (film star), maternal grandmother was of Scotch-Irish heritage
- Alec Baldwin (actor)
- Daniel Baldwin (actor)
- Stephen Baldwin (actor)
- William Baldwin (actor)
- Tallulah Bankhead (actress)
- Kim Basinger (actress)
- Warren Beatty (actor, producer, director), of part Scotch-Irish descent
- Justin Bieber (musician), of part descent
- Johnny Cash (musician)
- June Carter Cash (musician)
- Jessica Chastain (actress), small amount of Scotch-Irish ancestry
- Eddie Cochran (musician)
- Rory Cochrane (actor)
- Kurt Cobain (musician), small amount of Scotch-Irish ancestry
- Charles Coburn (actor)
- James Coburn (actor)
- Emily Deschanel (actress), small amount of Scotch-Irish ancestry
- Zooey Deschanel (actress), small amount of Scotch-Irish ancestry
- Janice Dickinson (model), father of Scotch-Irish ancestry
- Shannen Doherty (actress), small amount of Scotch-Irish ancestry
- Michael Douglas (actor), his Bermudian mother Diana Dill is of part Ulster Scots ancestry
- Haylie Duff (actress), small amount of Scotch-Irish ancestry
- Shelley Duvall (actress and producer)
- Aaron Eckhart (actor)
- Carrie Fisher (actress), small amount of Scotch-Irish ancestry
- Megan Fox (actress), small amount of Scotch-Irish ancestry
- Stephen Foster (songwriter)
- Zach Galifianakis (actor), his mother is partially of Scotch-Irish descent
- Crystal Gayle (singer)
- Judy Garland (actress, singer, dancer, vaudevillian, television and radio presenter), she was of Irish, English, Scottish and French Huguenot ancestry
- Mel Gibson (actor)
- Summer Glau (actress, classically trained ballet dancer), small amount of Scotch-Irish ancestry
- Edna Goodrich (Broadway and silent screen actress; Florodora girl)
- Martha Graham (dancer, choreographer)
- Moby (musician, DJ, vegan) small amount of Scotch-Irish ancestry
- Merle Haggard (musician)
- Barbara Hale (actress)
- Armie Hammer (actor), small amount of Scotch-Irish ancestry
- Smith Hart (wrestler)
- Bruce Hart (wrestler)
- Keith Hart (wrestler)
- Wayne Hart (referee)
- Dean Hart (wrestler)
- Bret Hart (wrestler)
- Ross Hart (wrestler)
- Diana Hart (wrestling valet)
- Owen Hart (wrestler)
- Colton Haynes (actor)
- Kate Hudson (actress), small amount of Scotch-Irish ancestry
- Oliver Hudson (actor), small amount of Scotch-Irish ancestry
- Anjelica Huston (actress)
- Danny Huston (actor)
- John Huston (director, actor)
- Michael Keaton (actor), small amount of Scotch-Irish ancestry
- Val Kilmer (actor)
- Kris Kristofferson (actor, singer)
- Burt Lancaster (actor)
- David Lynch (director), Scotch-Irish father
- Loretta Lynn (singer)
- Shirley MacLaine (actress, dancer, author), of part Scotch-Irish ancestry
- Steve Martin (actor)
- Frank McCown, aka Rory Calhoun (actor)
- Reba McEntire (singer, actress), of part Scotch-Irish ancestry
- Robert Mitchum (actor), partially of Scotch-Irish ancestry
- Elizabeth Montgomery (actress)
- Agnes Moorehead (actress)
- Mikey Madison (actress), one quarter of Scotch-Irish ancestry.
- Mary-Louise Parker (actress), small amount of Scotch-Irish ancestry
- Dolly Parton (country singer, songwriter, composer, author and actress), small amount of Scotch-Irish ancestry
- John Nelson Pattison (classical composer and pianist)
- Lou Diamond Phillips (actor), father was partly of Scotch-Irish ancestry
- Brad Pitt (actor)
- Ryan Potter (actor), mother was partly of Scotch-Irish ancestry
- Elvis Presley (musician, actor), of Scotch-Irish ancestry
- Dennis Quaid (actor)
- Burt Reynolds (actor), small amount of Scotch-Irish ancestry
- Debbie Reynolds (actress)
- Christina Ricci (actress), of Irish, Italian and Scottish ancestry
- Axl Rose (singer), father's line was Scotch-Irish
- Peter Sarsgaard (actor), small amount of Scotch-Irish ancestry
- Ricky Skaggs (singer)
- Ian Somerhalder (actor), of part Scotch-Irish ancestry
- Richard St. Clair (composer, pianist), father was of Scotch-Irish ancestry
- James Stewart (actor)
- Hilary Swank (actress), small amount of Scotch-Irish ancestry
- Maria Tallchief (prima ballerina)
- John Wayne (actor), of Scotch-Irish ancestry
- Hank Williams (singer), Scotch-Irish mother
- Mary Elizabeth Winstead (actress), small amount of Scotch-Irish ancestry
- Jonathan Winters (actor), small amount of Scotch-Irish ancestry

== Literature ==
- L. Frank Baum (author)
- William Faulkner (author)
- Ellen Glasgow (novelist)
- Cork Graham (author)
- Stephen King (author)
- Carson McCullers (author)
- David McCullough (historian)
- Larry McMurtry (author)
- Margaret Mitchell (author)
- Edgar Allan Poe (author), paternal side of his family were Ulster Scots from County Cavan
- John Steinbeck (author)
- Mark Twain, aka Samuel Clemens (author, wit), family were from County Antrim
- Thomas Wolfe (author)

== Sports ==
- Mickey Cochrane (sportsman)
- Kirk Cousins (NFL quarterback)
- Jeff Gordon (NASCAR driver)
- Josh McCown (NFL quarterback)
- Luke McCown (NFL quarterback)
- Randy McCown (Texas A&M Aggies quarterback)
- Arnold Palmer (golfer)
- Aaron Rodgers (NFL quarterback)
- David Wright (MLB third baseman)
- Keith Hernandez (MLB first baseman), maternal Scotch-Irish ancestry

== Science and Industry ==
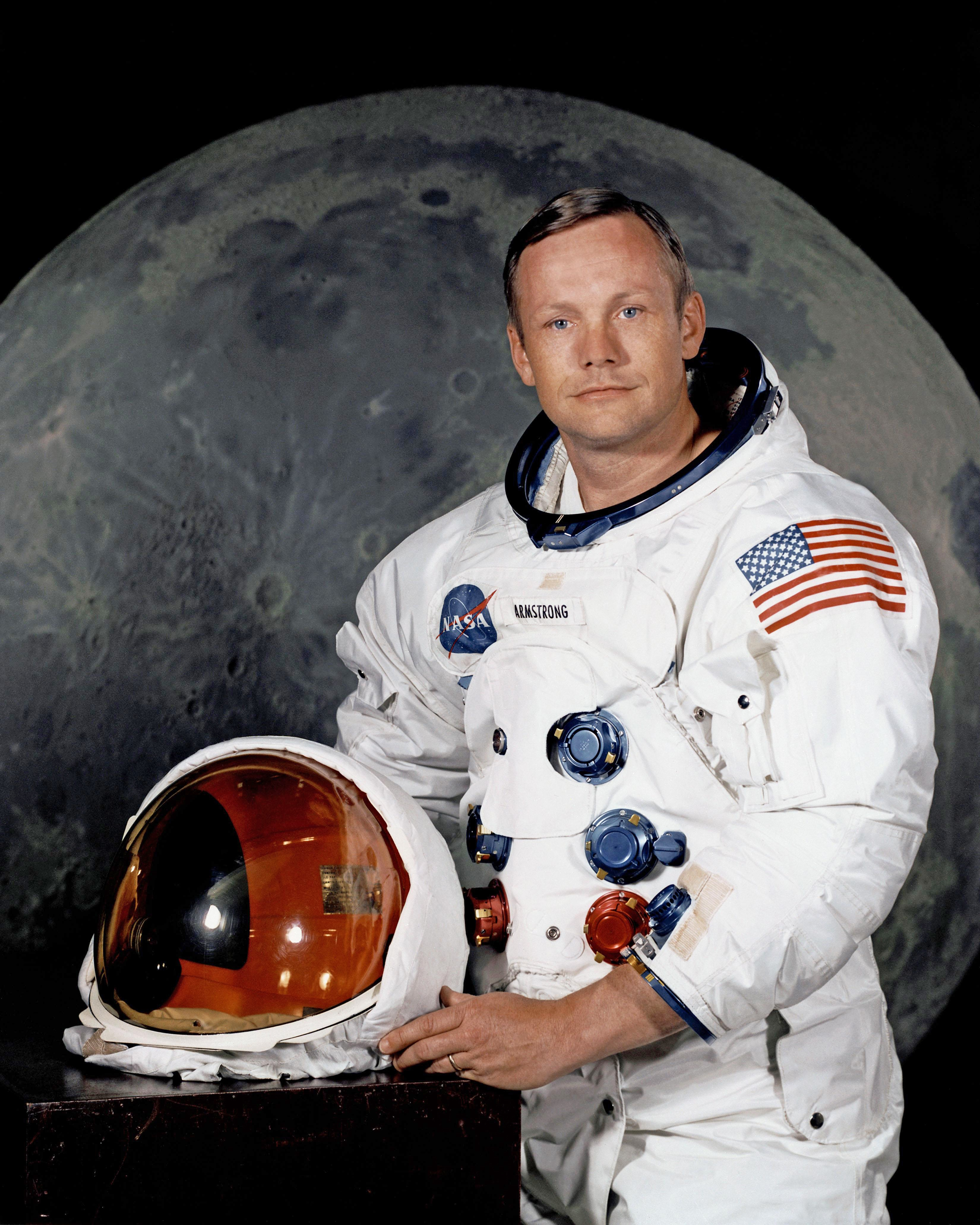
Neil Armstrong, first man to set foot on the Moon

- Neil Armstrong (astronaut)
- James M. Buchanan (economist; 1986 Nobel Prize Laureate in Economics)
- Charles Stark Draper (inventor of inertial navigation)
- Timothy Eaton (founder of the Eaton's department store)
- Robert Fulton (inventor)
- Bill Gates (chairman of Microsoft)
- J. Paul Getty (industrialist)
- James Irwin (astronaut)
- Jay Last (physicist and pioneer of Silicon Valley)
- James Laughlin (industrialist)
- Thomas Mellon (industrialist)
- Bruce McCandless II (astronaut)
- Cyrus McCormick (inventor)
- Robert McCormick (inventor)
- Samuel Morse (inventor)
- Kary Mullis (inventor of PCR, Nobel Prize winner)
- Charles Murray (political scientist)
- Harry Gordon Selfridge (founder of eponymous department store)
- John Stephenson (inventor)
- Alexander Turney Stewart (retail innovator)
- James E. Webb (NASA administrator)

== Journalism ==
- Tammy Bruce (radio talk show host)
- James Creelman (journalist)
- Robert R. McCormick (owner of Chicago Tribune)
- Harold Ross (founder of The New Yorker)

== Others ==
- Daniel Boone (frontiersman)
- Kit Carson (frontiersman)
- Wyatt Earp (lawman)
- Rosa Parks (civil rights activist)
- William Luther Pierce (far-right political activist, neo-Nazi and white supremacist who was of English, Irish and Scottish ancestry)
- Sir Henry Worth Thornton (President, Canadian National Railways; coach, Vanderbilt University football team)
- William Wheeler Thornton (judge, author, Indiana Supreme Court librarian)
