= Alexander W. Taylor =

American politician

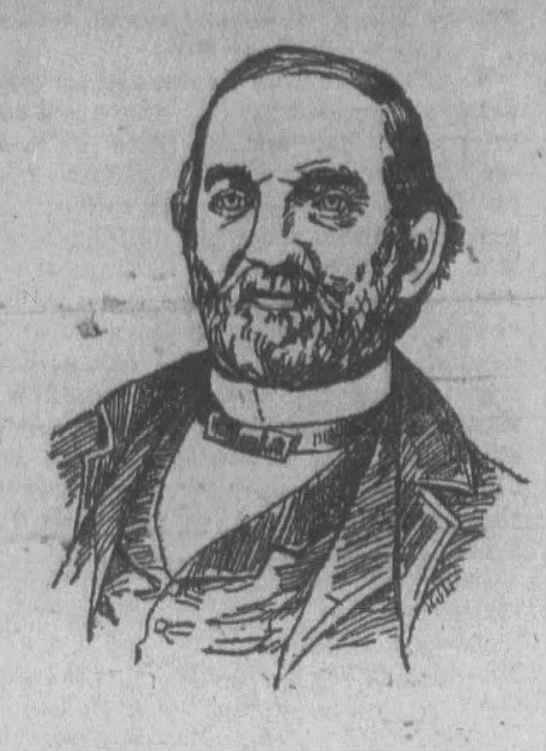
Indiana Times, May 10, 1893

Alexander Wilson Taylor (March 22, 1815 – May 7, 1893) was a Republican member of the U.S. House of Representatives from Pennsylvania.

== Biography ==
Born in Indiana, Pennsylvania on March 22, 1815, Taylor pursued classical studies, attended the Indiana Academy and Jefferson College in Canonsburg, Pennsylvania. After graduating from the Dickinson School of Law in Carlisle, Pennsylvania, he was admitted to the bar in 1841, and subsequently began to practice law in Indiana, Pennsylvania.

He served as the clerk of the court of Indiana County, Pennsylvania, from 1845 to 1848, and was a member of the Pennsylvania State House of Representatives in 1859 and 1860.

Taylor was then elected as a Republican to the Forty-third Congress.

After completing his legislative service, he resumed the practice of law. He died in Indiana in 1893, and was interred in the Greenwood Cemetery.

U.S. House of Representatives
Preceded by Henry D. Foster	Member of the U.S. House of Representatives from Pennsylvania's 21st congressional district 1873-1875	Succeeded by Jacob Turney
