= 2021 Rugby League World Cup Group B =

The 2021 Rugby League World Cup Group B may refer to:

- 2021 Men's Rugby League World Cup Group B
- 2021 Women's Rugby League World Cup Group B
- 2021 Wheelchair Rugby League World Cup Group B

== See also ==
- 2021 Rugby League World Cup (disambiguation)
