= Manx Americans =

Americans of Manx birth or descent

Americanyn Manninagh (Manx)

Total population
- Self-identified as "Manx"; 6,955 (2000)

Regions with significant populations
- Ohio, Illinois, Indiana, California, Virginia and Washington, D.C., particularly the cities of Cleveland, Mentor, and Painesville, Ohio and Peoria, Illinois.

Languages
- English, Manx

Religion
- Christianity

Related ethnic groups
- Breton Americans, Cornish Americans, English Americans, Irish Americans, Scottish Americans, Scotch-Irish Americans, Welsh Americans

Manx Americans (Manx: Americanyn Manninagh) are Americans of full or partial Manx ancestral origin or Manx people who reside in the United States of America. Areas with significant numbers of people whose ancestry originates from the Isle of Man include Holt County, Missouri, and Cleveland, Ohio.

== Settlement in Missouri ==
William Banks was the first Manx settler in Holt County, Missouri, 1841. He was followed by members of the Callow, Cottier, Garrett, Kennish, and Teare families of Maughold. Thomas Cottier arrived in Holt County in 1847, and through his influence approximately 500 Manx people immigrated to the state from the island.

== Settlement in Ohio ==
The city of Cleveland, Ohio, is said to have the highest concentration of Americans of Manx descent in the United States. They predominantly descend from the village of Andreas on the northern side of the Isle of Man. From 1822 onwards, many families such as the Corlett family became farmers and leased land from the Connecticut Land Company. In 1826, more families such as the Kelleys, Teares, and Kneens established themselves in Newburgh, which would encourage more Manx settlement into the area. Cleveland was a town of only six hundred people. A population grew to around 3000 of both Manx-born and of Manx descent, bound together by their Manx language and customs. Among the immigrants was William Corlett, who donated land for the community's log schoolhouse so Manx children would be educated in their native Manx and English languages.

== Notable people ==
- Dan Auerbach (born 1979), singer and guitarist of the Black Keys
- John Thomas Caine (1829–1911), politician in the state of Utah
- Cannon family, prominent political family in Utah
- John Cubbins (1827–1894), businessman and politician in Tennessee
- William Garrett (1842–1916), fought in the American Civil War
- William Kennish (1799–1862), scientist and explorer
- Elizabeth Holloway Marston (1893–1993), psychologist
- Jeremiah McGuire (1823–1889), politician and lawyer in New York
- Dan Quayle (born 1947), Vice President of the United States from 1989 until 1993
- William Edward Quine (1847–1922), physician, academic, and philanthropist of Illinois
- Christopher Stott (born 1969), space entrepreneur
- Letitia Christian Tyler (1790–1842), first wife of U.S. President John Tyler
- Willard Van Orman Quine (1908–2000), logician and philosopher
- John Ambrose Watterson (1844–1899), Catholic bishop
