= 2021 Rugby League World Cup Group A =

The 2021 Rugby League World Cup Group A may refer to:

- 2021 Men's Rugby League World Cup Group A
- 2021 Women's Rugby League World Cup Group A
- 2021 Wheelchair Rugby League World Cup Group A
- 2021 Physical Disability Rugby League World Cup group stage

== See also ==
- 2021 Rugby League World Cup (disambiguation)
