= Callow =

Callow may refer to:

== Places ==
- Callow, Derbyshire, England, a village and a civil parish
- Callow, Herefordshire, England, a village and a civil parish
- Callow, Shropshire, England
- Callow Hill, Worcestershire, England, an area
- Callow End, Worcestershire, England
- Callow, County Fermanagh, a townland in County Fermanagh, Northern Ireland
- County Carlow, Ireland
- Shannon Callows, Ireland, an area of flood-prone land along the River Shannon

== Other uses ==
- Callow (surname)
- Callow (band), a duo based in the San Francisco Bay Area
- Callow, Irish term for flood-meadow
- Callow, in biology, an arthropod that has just undergone ecdysis
