= Rugby =

Rugby may refer to:

== Sport ==
- Rugby football in many forms:
  - Rugby union, 15 players per side
    - American flag rugby
    - Beach rugby
    - Mini rugby
    - Rugby sevens, seven players per side
    - Rugby tens, ten players per side
    - Rugby X, five players per side
    - Samoa rules
    - Snow rugby
    - Touch rugby
    - Tambo rugby
    - Wheelchair rugby
  - Rugby league, 13 players per side
    - Masters Rugby League
    - Mod league
    - Rugby league nines
    - Rugby league sevens
    - Physical disability rugby league
    - Touch (sport)
    - Wheelchair rugby league
  - Both codes:
    - Tag rugby
- Rugby ball, a ball for use in rugby football
- Rugby fives, a handball game, similar to squash, played in an enclosed court
- Underwater rugby, an underwater sport played in a swimming pool and named after rugby football

== Arts and entertainment ==
- Rugby (video game), the 2000 installment of Electronic Arts' Rugby video game series
- Rugby, second movement of Mouvements symphoniques by Arthur Honegger

== Brands and enterprises ==
- Rugby (automobile), made by Durant Motors
- Rugby Cement, a former UK PLC, now a subsidiary of Cemex
- Rugby Ralph Lauren, a brand from fashion designer Ralph Lauren

== Places ==
=== United Kingdom ===
- Rugby, Warwickshire, a town in England
  - Rugby (UK Parliament constituency)
  - Borough of Rugby
- Rugby Park, Kilmarnock FC's stadium, Scotland

=== United States ===
- Rugby, Boston
- Rugby, Colorado
- Rugby, Indiana
- Rugby, North Dakota
- Rugby, Virginia
- Rugby, Tennessee
- Rugby Junction, Wisconsin
- Rugby, a former name for Remsen Village, Brooklyn

=== Australia ===
- Rugby, New South Wales, Australia

== Transportation ==
- Rugby (automobile), made by Durant Motors
- Rugby station (disambiguation)
- Rugby Street, a street in Bloomsbury, London, England
- Rugby services, a motorway service station in England

== Other uses ==
- Rugby boy, street children in the Philippines
- Rugby Group, group of UK public schools
- Rugby School, Rugby, Warwickshire, England
- Baron Rugby, a title in the British peerage
- Rugby Radio Station, a former very low-frequency radio transmission facility in Rugby, Warwickshire, England
- Operation Rugby, allied airborne landing in France in August 1944

== See also ==
- Comparison of rugby league and rugby union
- Women's rugby (disambiguation)
- Football (disambiguation)
