= British Americans =

Americans of British birth or descent

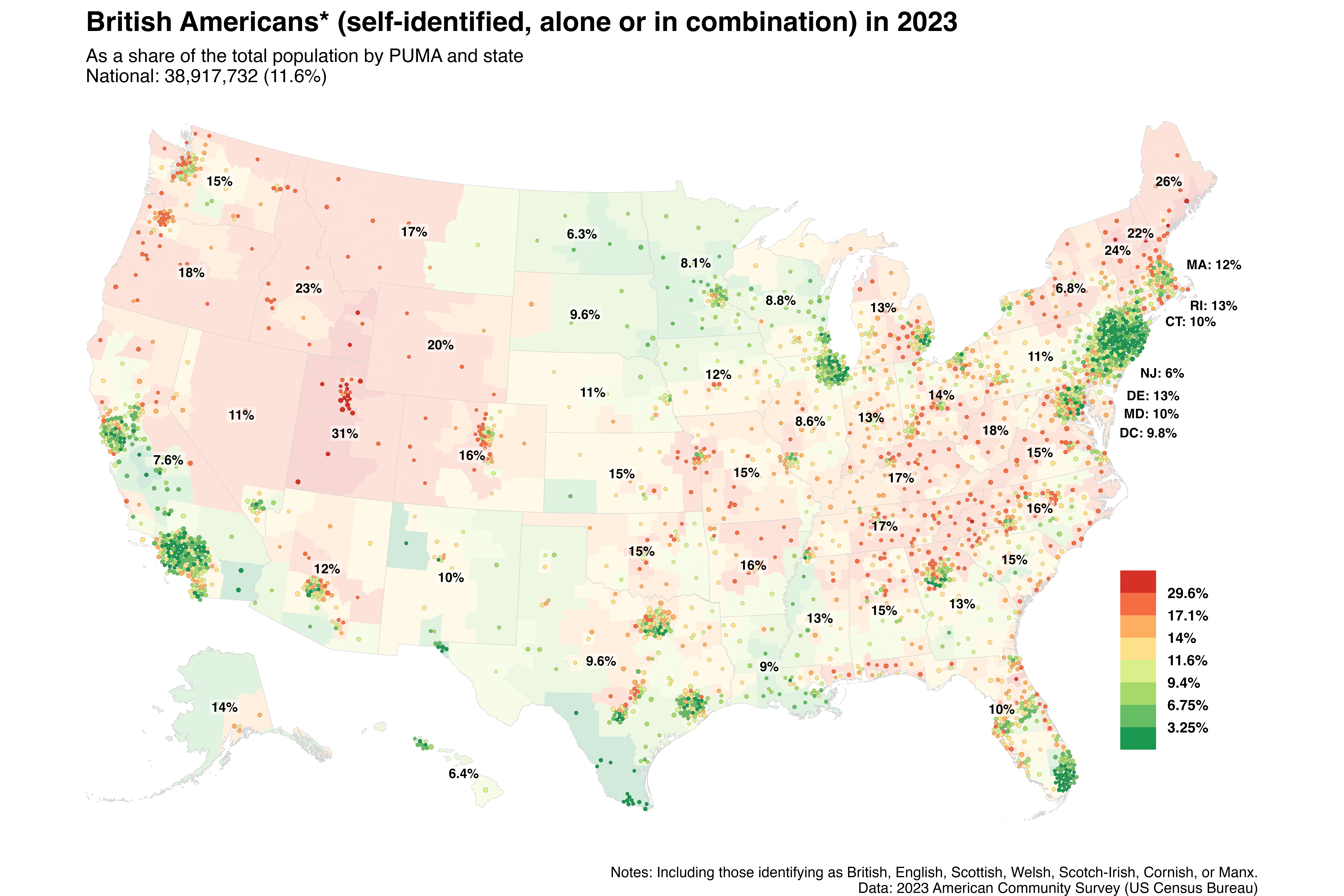

Total population
- 58.6 million (2020 census); 18.4% of the total US population • English: 46.6 million • Scottish: 8.4 million • Scotch-Irish: 794 thousand • Welsh: 2 million • Manx: 7 thousand • British: 860 thousand Alone; 39.1 million (2020 census); 11.8% of the total US population

Regions with significant populations
- Throughout the entire United States; Less common in the Midwest; Predominantly in the South, New England and Mountain West regions.

Languages
- English (American and British), Goidelic languages, Scots, Cornish, Welsh

Religion
- Christian; Mainly Protestant (esp. Baptist, Congregationalist, Episcopalian, Methodist, Presbyterian and Quaker), to a lesser extent Catholic and Latter-day Saint (Although the Latter is significant in Utah) as well as non-religious, along with converts to Orthodox Christianity, Islam, Judaism, eastern religions, etc.

Related ethnic groups
- English Americans; Scottish Americans; Welsh Americans; Ulster Scots Americans; Manx Americans; Cornish Americans; Americans; British Canadians; Gaels; Britons; Orcadians; Irish Americans; White Americans; European Americans; Old Stock Americans

British Americans usually refers to Americans whose ancestral origin originates wholly or partly in the United Kingdom (England, Scotland, Wales, and Northern Ireland and also the Isle of Man, the Channel Islands, and Gibraltar). It is primarily a demographic or historical research category for people who have at least partial descent from peoples of Great Britain and the modern United Kingdom, i.e. English, Scottish, Welsh, Scotch-Irish, Orcadian, Manx, Cornish Americans and those from the Channel Islands and Gibraltar.

Based on 2020 American Community Survey estimates, 1,934,397 individuals identified as having British ancestry, while a further 25,213,619 identified as having English ancestry, 5,298,861 Scottish ancestry and 1,851,256 Welsh ancestry. The total of these groups, at 34,298,133, was 10.5% of the total population. A further 31,518,129 individuals identified as having Irish ancestry, but this is not differentiated between modern Northern Ireland (part of the United Kingdom) and the Republic of Ireland, which was part of the United Kingdom during the greatest phase of Irish immigration. Figures for Manx and Cornish ancestries are not separately reported, although Manx was reported prior to 1990, numbering 9,220 on the 1980 census, and some estimates put Cornish ancestry as high as 2 million. This figure also does not include people reporting ancestries in countries with majority or plurality British ancestries, such as Canadian, South African, New Zealander (21,575) or Australian (105,152). There has been a significant drop overall, especially from the 1980 census where 49.59 million people reported English ancestry and larger numbers reported Scottish, Welsh and Northern Irish ancestry also.

Demographers regard current figures as a "serious under-count", as a large proportion of Americans of British descent have tended to simply identify as 'American' since 1980. In that year, over 13.3 million or 5.9% of the total U.S. population self-identified as "American" or "United States", which was counted under "not specified". This response is highly overrepresented in the Upland South, a region settled historically by Britons. Those of mixed European ancestry may identify with a more recent and differentiated ethnic group. Of the top ten family names in the United States (2010), seven have English origins or having possible mixed British Isles heritage (such as Welsh, Scottish or Cornish), the other three being of Spanish origin.

== Sense of heritage ==
UK United States.

Americans of British heritage are often seen, and identify, as simply "American" due to the many historic, linguistic and cultural ties between Great Britain and the U.S. and their influence on the country's population. A leading specialist, Charlotte Erickson, found them to be ethnically "invisible". This may be due to the early establishment of British settlements; as well as to non-English groups having emigrated in order to establish significant communities.

== Number of British Americans ==
Table below shows census results between 1980 (when data on ancestry was first collected) and the 2020 census. Response rates for the question on ancestry was 83.1% (1980) 90.4% (1990) and 80.1% (2000) for the total population of the United States.

Year	Ethnic origin	Population	%
British; total		61,327,867	31.67
1980	English	49,598,035	26.34
1980	Scottish	10,048,816	4.44
1980	Welsh	1,664,598	0.88
1980	Northern Irish	16,418	0.01
Total		46,816,175	18.8
1990	English	32,651,788	13.1
1990	Scottish	5,393,581	2.2
1990	Scotch-Irish	5,617,773	2.3
1990	Welsh	2,033,893	0.8
1990	British	1,119,140	0.4
Total		36,564,465	12.9
2000	English	24,515,138	8.7
2000	Scottish	4,890,581	1.7
2000	Scotch-Irish	4,319,232	1.5
2000	Welsh	1,753,794	0.6
2000	British	1,085,720	0.4
Total		37,619,881	14.4
2010	English	25,927,345	8.4
2010	Scottish	5,460,679	3.1
2010	Scotch-Irish	3,257,161	1.9
2010	Welsh	1,793,356	0.6
2010	British	1,181,340	0.4
Total		58,649,411	TBA
2020	English	46,550,968	14.0
2020	Scottish	8,422,613	TBA
2020	Scots-Irish	794,478	TBA
2020	Welsh	1,977,383	TBA
2020	British	860,315	TBA
2020	British Islander	43,654	TBA

=== Composition of Colonial America ===
Ethnic distribution in 1700.
1. English / Welsh (80.0%)
2. Dutch (4.00%)
3. Scottish (3.00%)
4. African American (11.0%)
5. Other Europeans (2.00%)
6. 0.00%

According to estimates by Thomas L. Purvis (1984), published in the European ancestry of the United States, gives the ethnic composition of the American colonies from 1700 to 1755. British ancestry in 1755 was estimated to be 63%, comprising 52% English and Welsh, 7.0% Scots-Irish, and 4% Scottish.

=== Studies on origins, 1790 ===
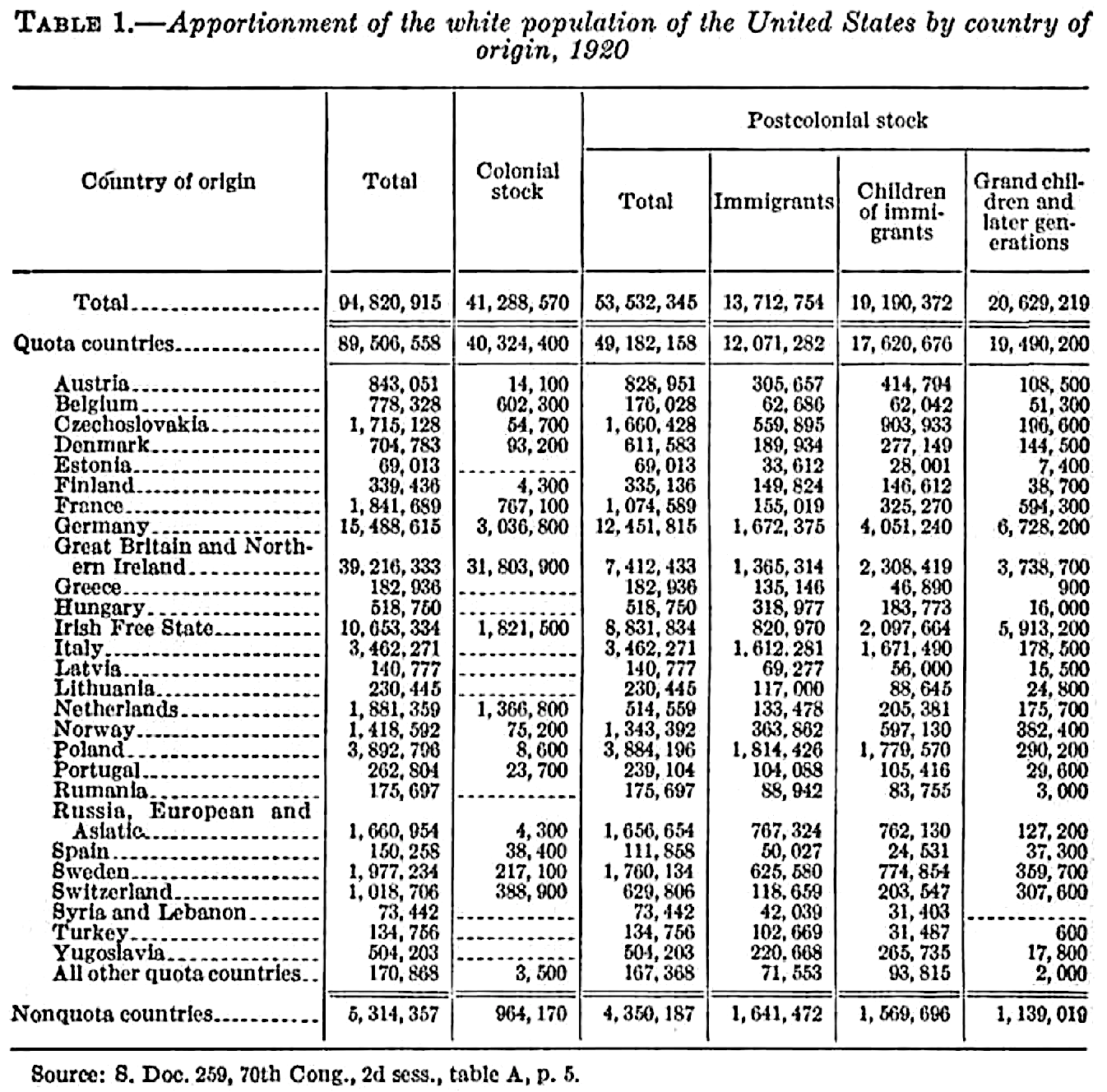
The White Population of the United States in 1920, apportioned according to the National Origins Formula prescribed by §11(c) of the Immigration Act of 1924. About 43.5% of White Americans were deemed to be of colonial stock descended from the population enumerated in 1790, more than 3/4 of whom from Great Britain.

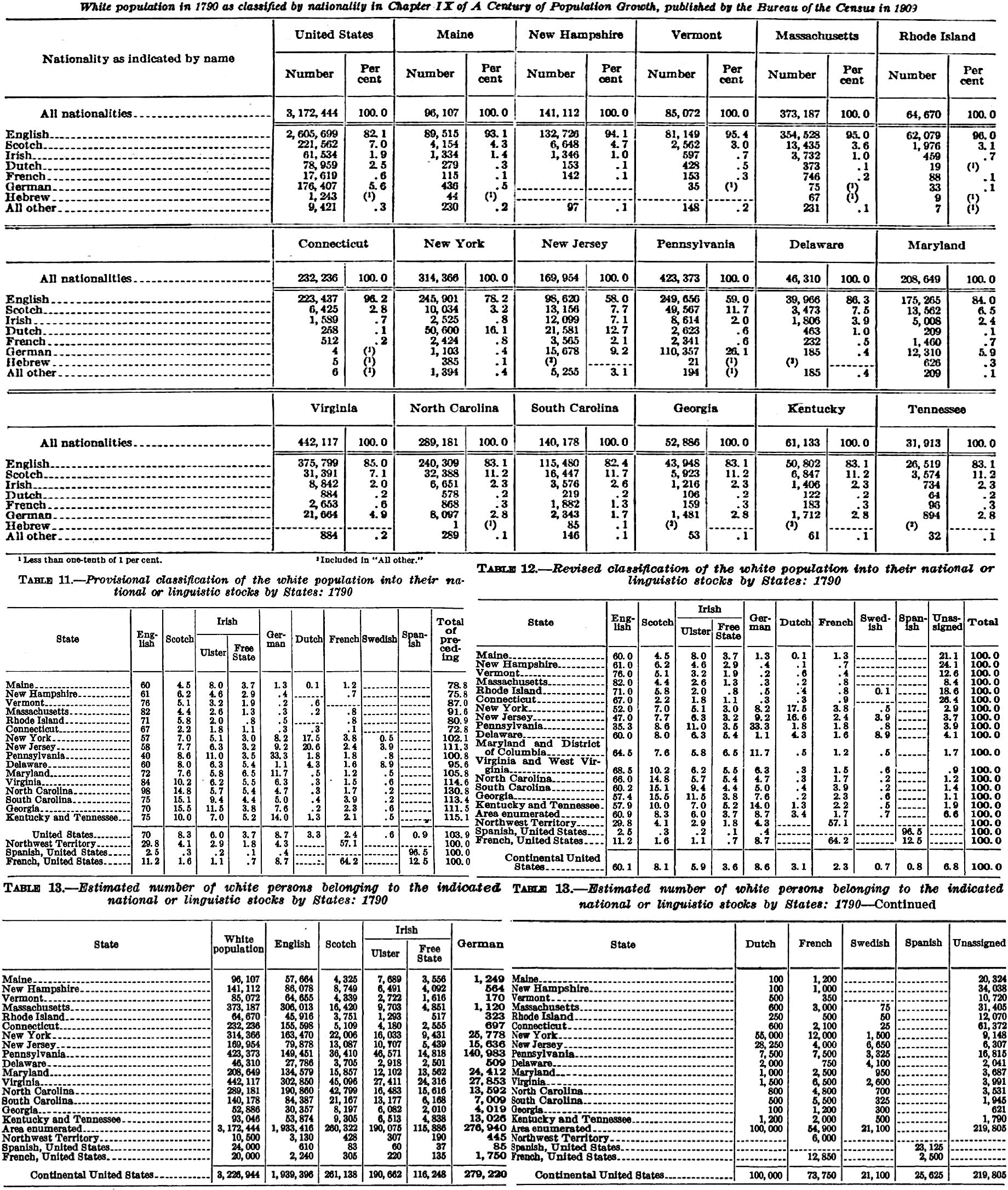
European Americans in 1790, by nationality, according to the preliminary Century of Population Growth estimate in 1909 (top half) and revised American Council of Learned Societies study estimates accepted by the Census Bureau in 1929 (bottom half).

The ancestry of the 3,929,214 population in 1790 has been estimated by various sources by sampling last names in the very first United States official census and assigning them a country of origin. There is debate over the accuracy between the studies with individual scholars and the Federal Government using different techniques and conclusion for the ethnic composition. A study published in 1909 titled A Century of Population Growth by the Census Bureau estimated the British origin combined were around 90% of the white population.

Another source by Thomas L. Purvis in 1984 estimated that people of British ancestry made up about 62% of the total population or 74% of the white or European American population. Some 81% of the total United States population was of European heritage. Around 757,208 were of African descent with 697,624 being slaves.

==== A Century of Population Growth (1909) ====
Estimated British American population in the Continental United States as of the 1790 Census.

State or Territory
State or Territory	United Kingdom of Great Britain and Ireland								(United Kingdom) British Isles Total	
State or Territory	Great Britain				(Kingdom of Great Britain) British Total		Ireland		(United Kingdom) British Isles Total	
State or Territory	(England) English (Wales) (Note: and Welsh)		(Scotland) Scotch		(Kingdom of Great Britain) British Total		(Ireland) Irish		(United Kingdom) British Isles Total	
State or Territory	#	%	#	%	#	%	#	%	#	%
Connecticut	223,437	96.21%	6,425	2.77%	229,862	98.98%	1,589	0.68%	231,451	99.66%
Delaware	39,966	86.30%	3,473	7.50%	43,439	93.80%	1,806	3.90%	45,245	97.70%
Georgia	43,948	83.10%	5,923	11.20%	49,871	94.30%	1,216	2.30%	51,087	96.60%
Kentucky	50,802	83.10%	6,847	11.20%	57,649	94.30%	1,406	2.30%	59,055	96.60%
Maine	89,515	93.14%	4,154	4.32%	93,669	97.46%	1,334	1.39%	95,003	98.85%
Maryland	175,265	84.00%	13,562	6.50%	188,827	90.50%	5,008	2.40%	193,835	92.90%
Massachusetts	354,528	95.00%	13,435	3.60%	367,963	98.60%	3,732	1.00%	371,695	99.60%
New Hampshire	132,726	94.06%	6,648	4.71%	139,374	98.77%	1,346	0.95%	140,720	99.72%
New Jersey	98,620	58.03%	13,156	7.74%	111,776	65.77%	12,099	7.12%	123,875	72.89%
New York	245,901	78.22%	10,034	3.19%	255,935	81.41%	2,525	0.80%	258,460	82.21%
North Carolina	240,309	83.10%	32,388	11.20%	272,697	94.30%	6,651	2.30%	279,348	96.60%
Pennsylvania	249,656	58.97%	49,567	11.71%	299,223	70.68%	8,614	2.03%	307,837	72.71%
Rhode Island	62,079	95.99%	1,976	3.06%	64,055	99.05%	459	0.71%	64,514	99.76%
South Carolina	115,480	82.38%	16,447	11.73%	131,927	94.11%	3,576	2.55%	135,503	96.66%
Tennessee	26,519	83.10%	3,574	11.20%	30,093	94.30%	734	2.30%	30,827	96.60%
Vermont	81,149	95.39%	2,562	3.01%	83,711	98.40%	597	0.70%	84,308	99.10%
Virginia	375,799	85.00%	31,391	7.10%	407,190	92.10%	8,842	2.00%	416,032	94.10%
United States	2,605,699	82.14%	221,562	6.98%	2,827,261	89.12%	61,534	1.94%	2,888,795	91.06%

==== American Council of Learned Societies (1929) ====
The 1909 Century of Population Growth report came under intense scrutiny in the 1920s; its methodology was subject to criticism over fundamental flaws that cast doubt on the accuracy of its conclusions. The catalyst for controversy had been passage of the Immigration Act of 1924, which imposed numerical quotas on each country of Europe limiting the number of immigrants to be admitted out of a finite total annual pool. The size of each national quota was determined by the National Origins Formula, in part computed by estimating the origins of the colonial stock population descended from White Americans enumerated in the 1790 Census. The undercount of other colonial stocks like German Americans and Irish Americans would thus have contemporary policy consequences. When CPG was produced in 1909, the concept of independent Ireland did not even exist. CPG made no attempt to further classify its estimated 1.9% Irish population to distinguish Celtic Irish Catholics of Gaelic Ireland, who in 1922 formed the independent Irish Free State, from the Scotch-Irish descendants of Ulster Scots and Anglo-Irish of the Plantation of Ulster, which became Northern Ireland and remained part of the United Kingdom. In 1927, proposed immigration quotas based on CPG figures were rejected by the President's Committee chaired by the Secretaries of State, Commerce, and Labor, with the President reporting to Congress "the statistical and historical information available raises grave doubts as to the whole value of these computations as the basis for the purposes intended." Among the criticisms of A Century of Population Growth:

- CPG failed to account for Anglicization of names, assuming any surname that could be English was actually English
- CPG failed to consider first names even when obviously foreign, assuming anyone with a surname that could be English was actually English
- CPG failed to consider regional variation in ethnic settlement e.g. surname Root could be assumed English in Vermont (less than 1% German), but more commonly a variant of German Roth in states with large German American populations like populous Pennsylvania (home to more Germans than the entire population of Vermont)
- CPG started by classifying all names as Scotch, Irish, Dutch, French, German, Hebrew, or other. All remaining names which could not be classed with one of the 6 other listed nationalities, nor identified by the Census clerk as too exotic to be English, were assumed to be English
- CPG classification was an unscientific process by Census clerks with no training in history, genealogy, or linguistics, nor were scholars in those fields consulted
- CPG estimates were produced by a linear process with no checks on potential errors nor opportunity for peer review or scholarly revision once an individual clerk had assigned a name to a nationality

Concluding that CPG "had not been accepted by scholars as better than a first approximation of the truth", the Census Bureau commissioned a study to produce new scientific estimates of the colonial American population, in collaboration with the American Council of Learned Societies, in time to be adopted as basis for legal immigration quotas in 1929, and later published in the journal of the American Historical Association, reproduced in the table below. Note: as in the original CPG report, the "English" category encompassed England and Wales, grouping together all names classified as either "Anglican" (from England) or "Cambrian" (from Wales).

(United Kingdom) Estimated British American population in the Continental United States as of the 1790 Census

State or Territory
State or Territory	United Kingdom								(United Kingdom) British Isles Total	
State or Territory	Great Britain				(Kingdom of Great Britain) British Total		Ulster		(United Kingdom) British Isles Total	
State or Territory	(England) English (Wales) (Note: and Welsh)		(Scotland) Scotch		(Kingdom of Great Britain) British Total		(Northern Ireland) Scotch-Irish		(United Kingdom) British Isles Total	
State or Territory	#	%	#	%	#	%	#	%	#	%
Connecticut	155,598	67.00%	5,109	2.20%	160,707	69.20%	4,180	1.80%	164,887	71.00%
Delaware	27,786	60.00%	3,705	8.00%	31,491	68.00%	2,918	6.30%	34,409	74.30%
Georgia	30,357	57.40%	8,197	15.50%	38,554	72.90%	6,082	11.50%	44,636	84.40%
Kentucky & (Tennessee) Tenn.	53,874	57.90%	9,305	10.00%	63,179	67.90%	6,513	7.00%	69,692	74.90%
Maine	57,664	60.00%	4,325	4.50%	61,989	64.50%	7,689	8.00%	69,678	72.50%
Maryland	134,579	64.50%	15,857	7.60%	150,436	72.10%	12,102	5.80%	162,538	77.90%
Massachusetts	306,013	82.00%	16,420	4.40%	322,433	86.40%	9,703	2.60%	332,136	89.00%
New Hampshire	86,078	61.00%	8,749	6.20%	94,827	67.20%	6,491	4.60%	101,318	71.80%
New Jersey	79,878	47.00%	13,087	7.70%	92,965	54.70%	10,707	6.30%	103,672	61.00%
New York	163,470	52.00%	22,006	7.00%	185,476	59.00%	16,033	5.10%	201,509	64.10%
North Carolina	190,860	66.00%	42,799	14.80%	233,659	80.80%	16,483	5.70%	250,142	86.50%
Pennsylvania	149,451	35.30%	36,410	8.60%	185,861	43.90%	46,571	11.00%	232,432	54.90%
Rhode Island	45,916	71.00%	3,751	5.80%	49,667	76.80%	1,293	2.00%	50,960	78.80%
South Carolina	84,387	60.20%	21,167	15.10%	105,554	75.30%	13,177	9.40%	118,731	84.70%
Vermont	64,655	76.00%	4,339	5.10%	68,994	81.10%	2,722	3.20%	71,716	84.30%
Virginia	302,850	68.50%	45,096	10.20%	347,946	78.70%	27,411	6.20%	375,357	84.90%
(Thirteen Colonies) 1790 Census Area	1,933,416	60.94%	260,322	8.21%	2,193,738	69.15%	190,075	5.99%	2,383,813	75.14%
(Ohio) Northwest Territory	3,130	29.81%	428	4.08%	3,558	33.89%	307	2.92%	3,865	36.81%
(New France) French America	2,240	11.20%	305	1.53%	2,545	12.73%	220	1.10%	2,765	13.83%
(Spanish Empire) Spanish America	610	2.54%	83	0.35%	693	2.89%	60	0.25%	753	3.14%
United States	1,939,396	60.10%	261,138	8.09%	2,200,534	68.19%	190,662	5.91%	2,391,196	74.10%

=== 1980 ===
The 1980 census was the first that asked people's ancestry. The 1980 United States Census reported 61,327,867 individuals or 31.67% of the total U.S. population self-identified as having British descent. In 1980, 16,418 Americans reported "Northern Islander". No Scots-Irish (descendants of Ulster-Scots) ancestry was recorded, although over ten million people identified as Scottish. This figure fell to over 5 million each in the following census when the Scotch-Irish were first counted.

=== 1990 ===
Over 90.4% of the United States population reported at least one ancestry, 9.6% (23,921,371) individuals as "not stated" with a total of 11.0% being "not specified". Additional responses were Cornish (3,991), Northern Irish 4,009 and Manx 6,317.

=== 2000 ===
Most of the population who stated their ancestry as "American" (20,625,093 or 7.3%) are said to be of old colonial British ancestry.

2000 Census
Ancestry	Number	% of total
German	42,885,162	15.2
African	36,419,434	12.9
Irish	30,594,130	10.9
English	24,515,138	8.7
Mexican	20,640,711	7.3
Italian	15,723,555	5.6
French	10,846,018	3.9
Hispanic	10,017,244	3.6
Polish	8,977,444	3.2
Scottish	4,890,581	1.7
Dutch	4,542,494	1.6
Norwegian	4,477,725	1.6
Scotch-Irish	4,319,232	1.5
United States	281,421,906	100

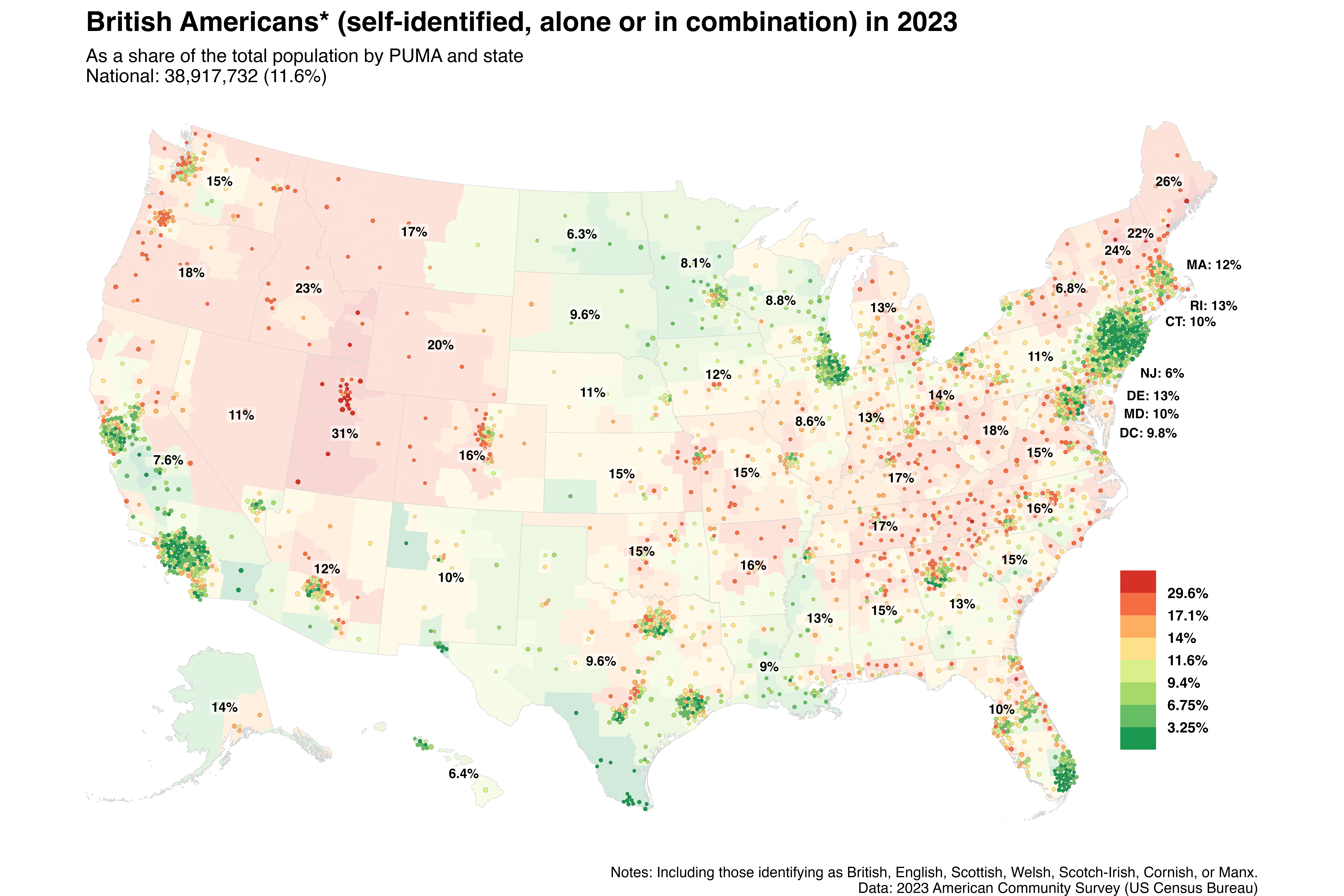
British Americans

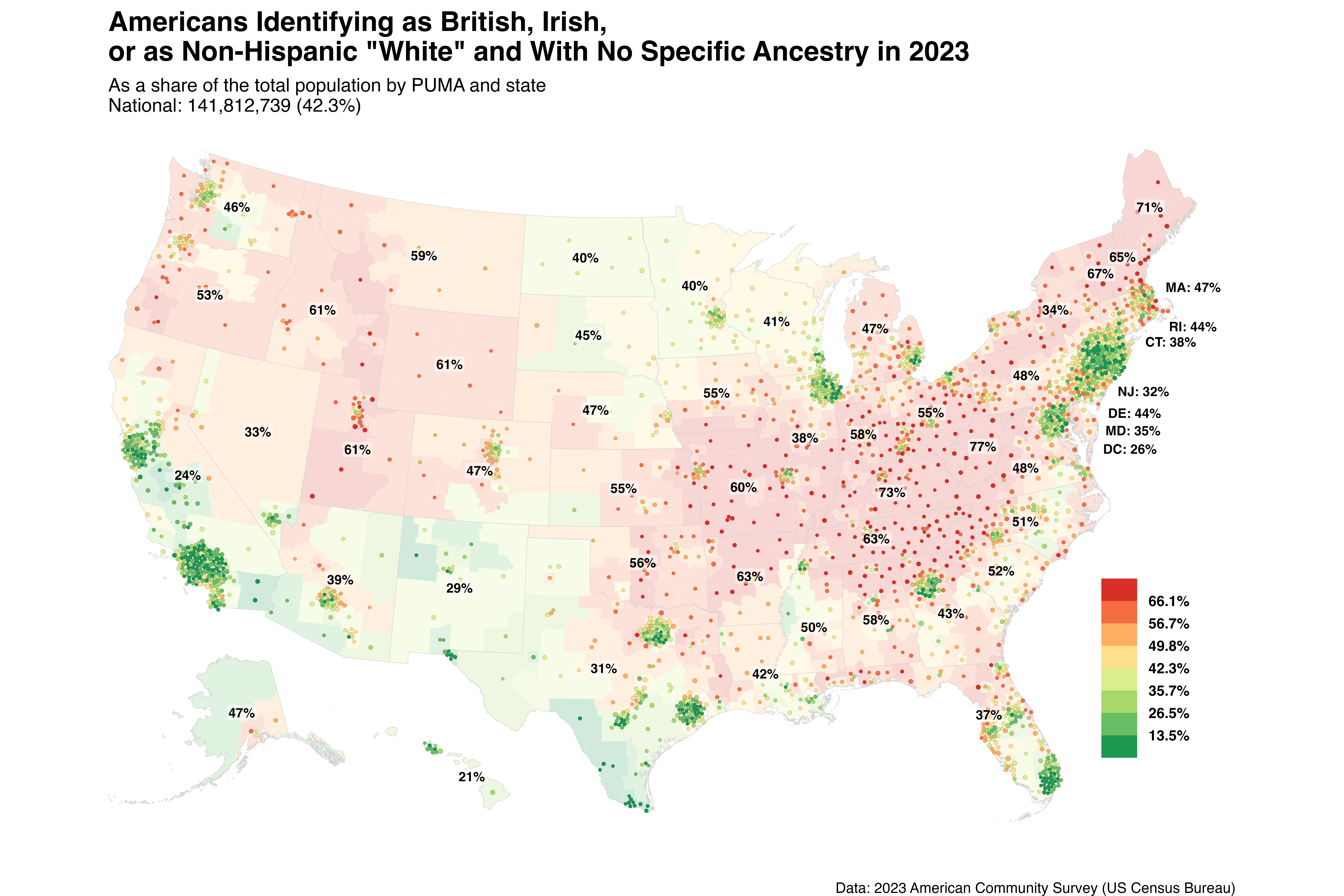
British, Irish, and White Americans not identifying ancestry

=== Geographical distribution ===
Following are the top 10 highest percentage of people of English, Scottish and Welsh ancestry, in U.S. communities with 500 or more total inhabitants (for the total list of the 101 communities, see references)

==== English ====
1. Hildale, Utah 66.9%
2. Colorado City, Arizona 52.7%
3. Milbridge, Maine 41.1%
4. Panguitch, Utah 40.0%
5. Beaver, Utah 39.8%
6. Enterprise, Utah 39.4%
7. East Machias, Maine 39.1%
8. Marriott-Slaterville, Utah 38.2%
9. Wellsville, Utah 37.9%
10. Morgan, Utah 37.2%

==== Scottish ====
1. Lonaconing, Maryland town 16.1%
2. Jordan, Illinois township 12.6%
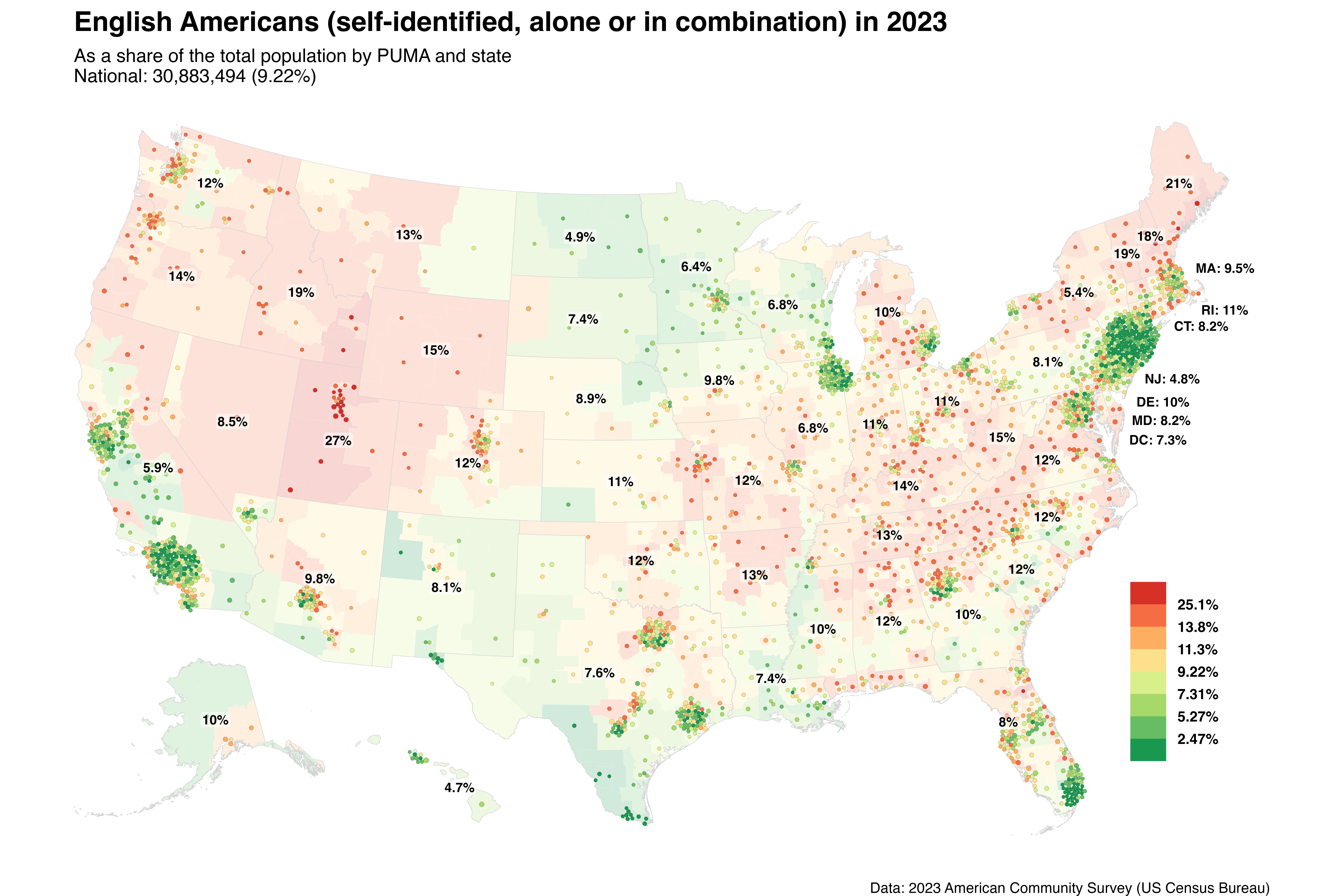
3. English Americans
  Scioto, Ohio township 12.1%
4. Randolph, Indiana township 10.2%
5. Franconia, New Hampshire town 10.1%
6. Topsham, Vermont town 10.0%
7. Ryegate, Vermont town 9.9%
8. Plainfield, Vermont town 9.8%
9. Saratoga Springs, Utah town 9.7%
10. Barnet, Vermont town 9.5%

==== Welsh ====
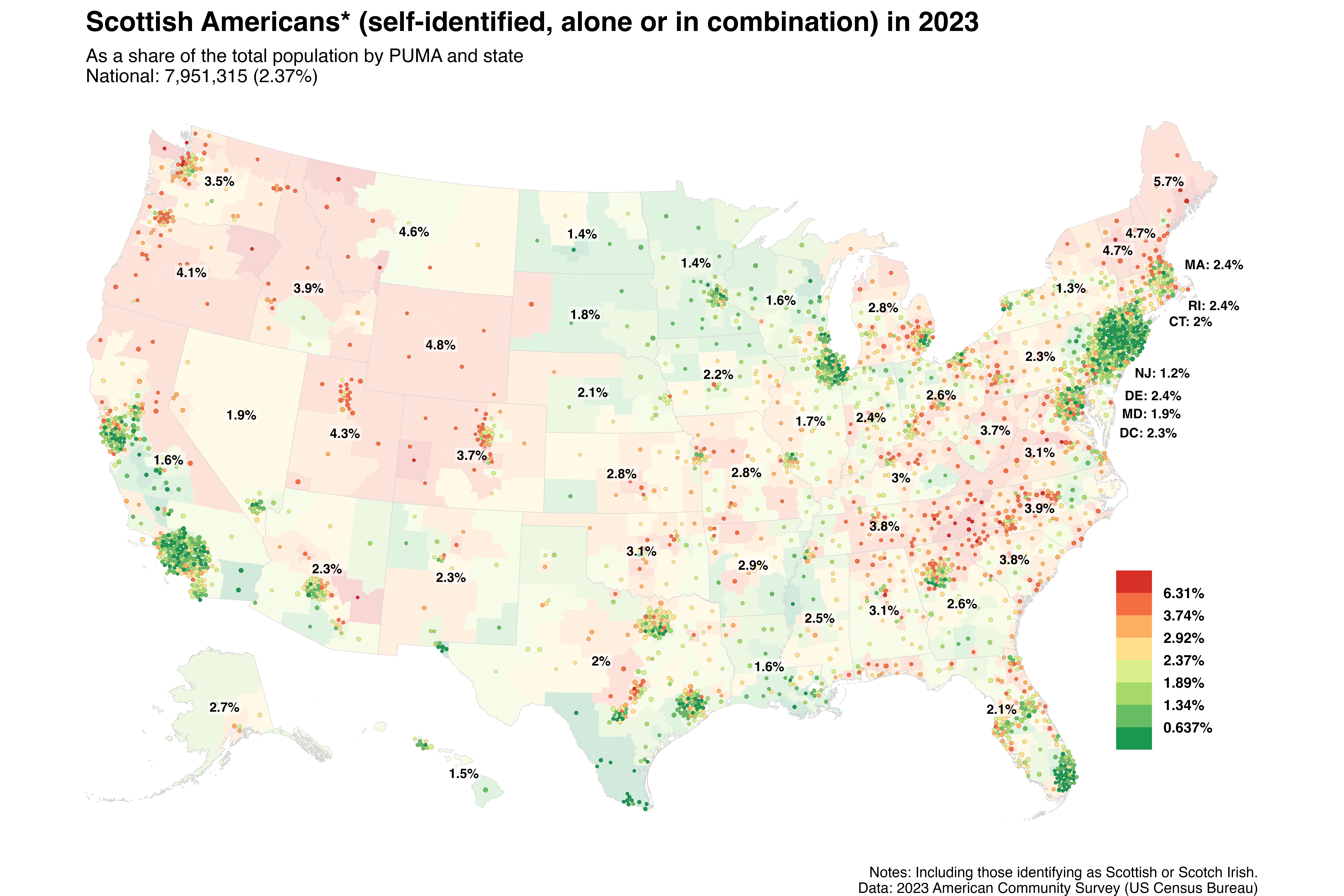
Scottish Americans

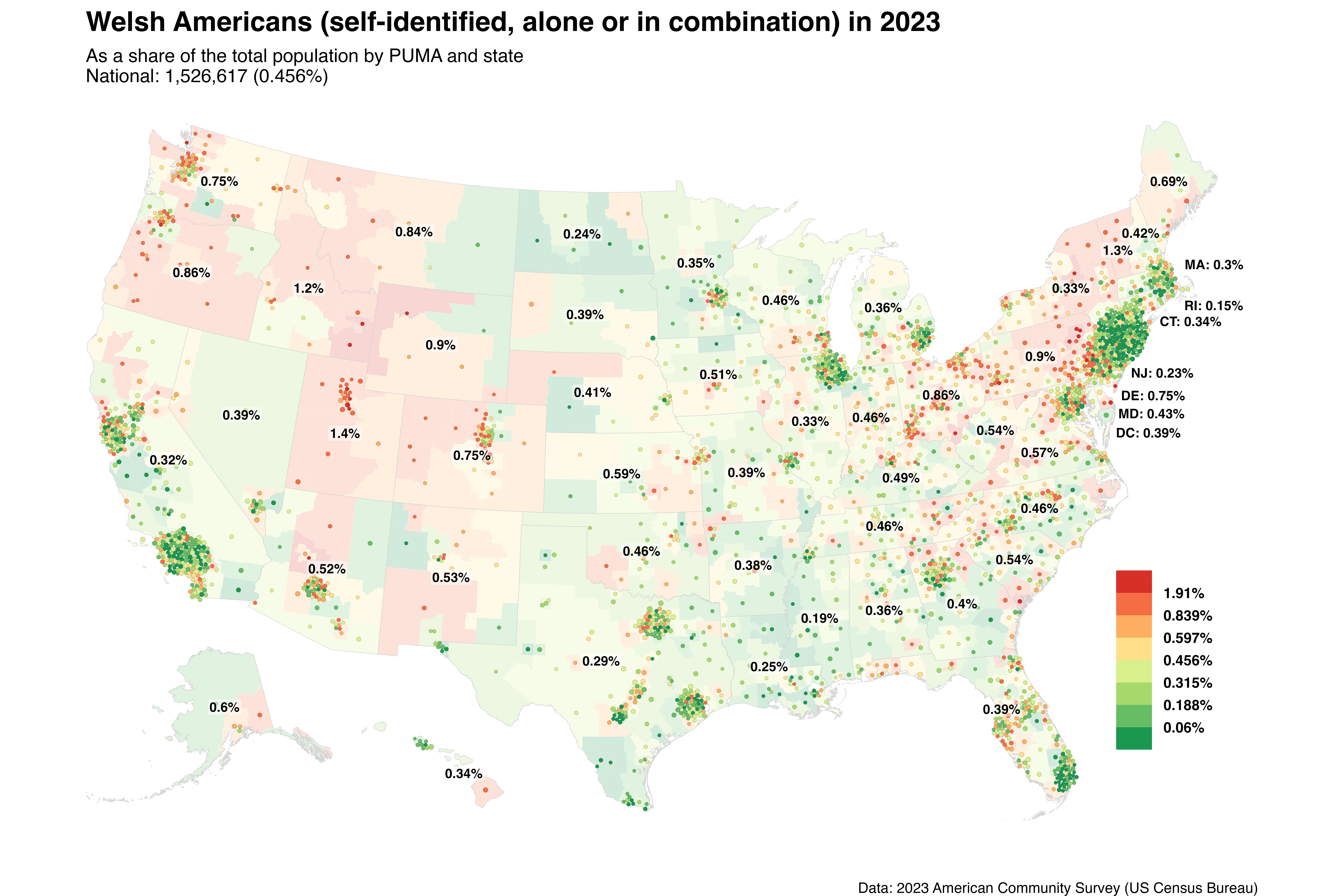
Welsh Americans

1. Malad City, Idaho city 21.1%
2. Remsen, New York town 14.6%
3. Oak Hill, Ohio village 13.6%
4. Madison, Ohio township 12.7%
5. Steuben, New York town 10.9%
6. Franklin, Ohio township 10.5%
7. Plymouth, Pennsylvania borough 10.3%
8. Jackson, Ohio city 10.0%
9. Lake, Pennsylvania township 9.9%
10. Radnor, Ohio township 9.8%

=== 2020 state totals ===
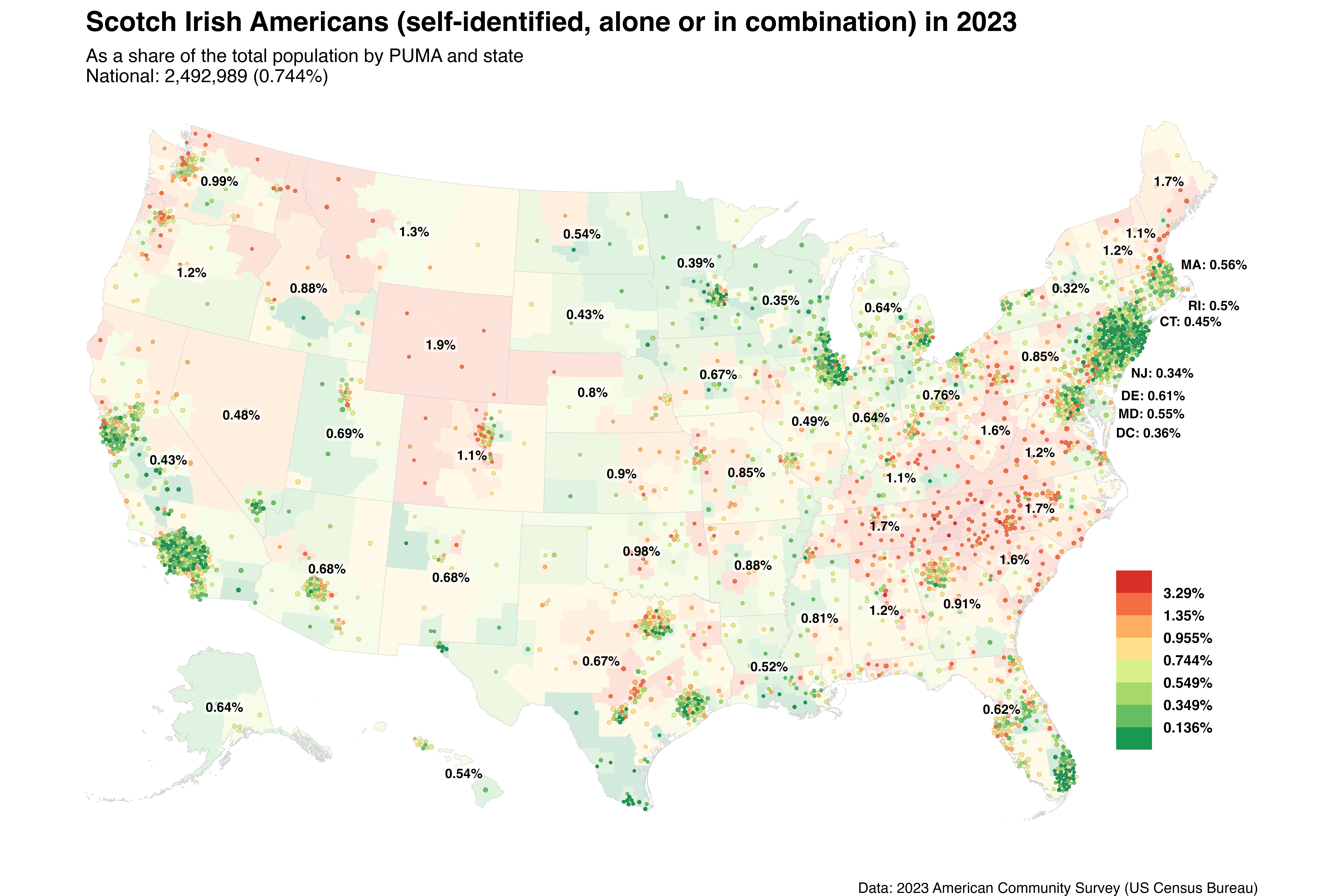
Scotch-Irish Americans

As of 2020, the distribution of British Americans (combined English, Welsh, Scottish, Scotch-Irish, and British ancestry self-identification) across the 50 states and DC is as presented in the following table:

Estimated British American population by state
State	Number	Percentage
Alabama	593,684	12.13%
Alaska	95,555	12.97%
Arizona	880,800	12.28%
Arkansas	362,319	12.03%
California	3,194,332	8.12%
Colorado	891,059	15.67%
Connecticut	410,316	11.49%
Delaware	125,678	12.99%
District of Columbia	62,960	8.97%
Florida	2,182,375	10.29%
Georgia	1,229,670	11.69%
Hawaii	85,508	6.02%
Idaho	413,867	23.59%
Illinois	1,039,812	8.18%
Indiana	827,256	12.35%
Iowa	363,077	11.53%
Kansas	424,001	14.56%
Kentucky	689,667	15.46%
Louisiana	362,382	7.77%
Maine	359,023	26.78%
Maryland	643,269	10.65%
Massachusetts	886,192	12.89%
Michigan	1,259,125	12.62%
Minnesota	455,104	8.13%
Mississippi	326,418	10.95%
Missouri	800,254	13.07%
Montana	187,084	17.62%
Nebraska	214,299	11.14%
Nevada	317,810	10.49%
New Hampshire	321,821	23.75%
New Jersey	606,095	6.82%
New Mexico	206,995	9.87%
New York	1,399,358	7.17%
North Carolina	1,618,439	15.58%
North Dakota	50,522	6.64%
Ohio	1,508,197	12.92%
Oklahoma	473,455	11.99%
Oregon	731,409	17.51%
Pennsylvania	1,465,777	11.46%
Rhode Island	142,889	13.51%
South Carolina	748,602	14.70%
South Dakota	77,081	8.77%
Tennessee	1,004,100	14.83%
Texas	2,667,892	9.32%
Utah	1,044,688	33.15%
Vermont	152,659	24.45%
Virginia	1,254,899	14.75%
Washington	1,201,638	16.00%
West Virginia	293,448	16.24%
Wisconsin	471,045	8.11%
Wyoming	111,384	19.16%
United States	37,235,289	11.40%

== History ==
=== Overview ===
The British diaspora consists of the scattering of British people and their descendants who emigrated from the United Kingdom. The diaspora is concentrated in countries that had mass migration such as the United States (as well as Canada, Australia, New Zealand, South Africa and Zimbabwe) and that are part of the English-speaking world. A 2006 publication from the Institute for Public Policy Research estimated 5.6 million British-born people lived outside of the United Kingdom.

After the Age of Discovery, the British were one of the earliest and largest communities to emigrate out of Europe, and the British Empire's expansion during the latter half of the 18th century, throughout the 19th century and first quarter of the 20th century saw an "extraordinary dispersion of the British people", with particular concentrations "in Australasia and North America", and to some degree into Africa and South Asia.

The British Empire was "built on waves of migration overseas by British people", who left the United Kingdom and "reached across the globe and permanently affected population structures in three continents". As a result of the British colonization of the Americas, what became the United States was "easily the greatest single destination of emigrant British".

Historically in the 1790 United States census estimate and presently in Australia, Canada, and New Zealand "people of British origin came to constitute the majority of the population" contributing to these states becoming integral to the Anglosphere. There is also a significant population of people with British ancestry in South Africa and in British Overseas Territories.

=== Colonial period ===
An English presence in North America began with the Roanoke Colony and Colony of Virginia in the late-16th century during the reign of Tudor queen Elizabeth I, but the first successful English settlement was established in 1607, on the James River at Jamestown. By the 1610s, an estimated 1,300 English people had travelled to North America, the "first of many millions from the British Isles". In 1620, the Pilgrims established the English imperial venture of Plymouth Colony, beginning "a remarkable acceleration of permanent emigration from England" with over 60% of trans-Atlantic English migrants settling in the New England Colonies. During the 17th century, an estimated 350,000 English, Welsh and Cornish migrants arrived in North America, which in the century after the Acts of Union 1707 was surpassed in rate and number by Scottish and Irish migrants.

John Trumbull's famous painting, Declaration of Independence. Most of the Founding Fathers had British ancestors.

The British policy of salutary neglect for its North American colonies intended to minimize trade restrictions as a way of ensuring they stayed loyal to British interests. This permitted the development of the American Dream, a cultural spirit distinct from that of its British founders. The Thirteen Colonies of British America began an armed rebellion with French support against British rule in 1775 when they rejected the right of the Parliament of Great Britain to govern them without representation; they proclaimed their independence in 1776, and subsequently constituted the first thirteen states of the United States of America, which became a sovereign state in 1781 with the ratification of the Articles of Confederation. The 1783 Treaty of Paris represented Great Britain's formal acknowledgment of the United States' sovereignty at the end of the American Revolutionary War.

In the original Thirteen Colonies, most laws contained strong elements found in the English common law system.

The vast majority of the Founding Fathers of the United States were of mixed British extraction. Most of them were of English descent, with smaller numbers of those of Scottish, Irish Protestant or Scots-Irish, and Welsh ancestry. A minority were of high social status and can be classified as White Anglo-Saxon Protestant (WASP). Many of the prewar WASP elite were Loyalists who left the new nation, some moving north to the Canadian colonies which remained under British rule.

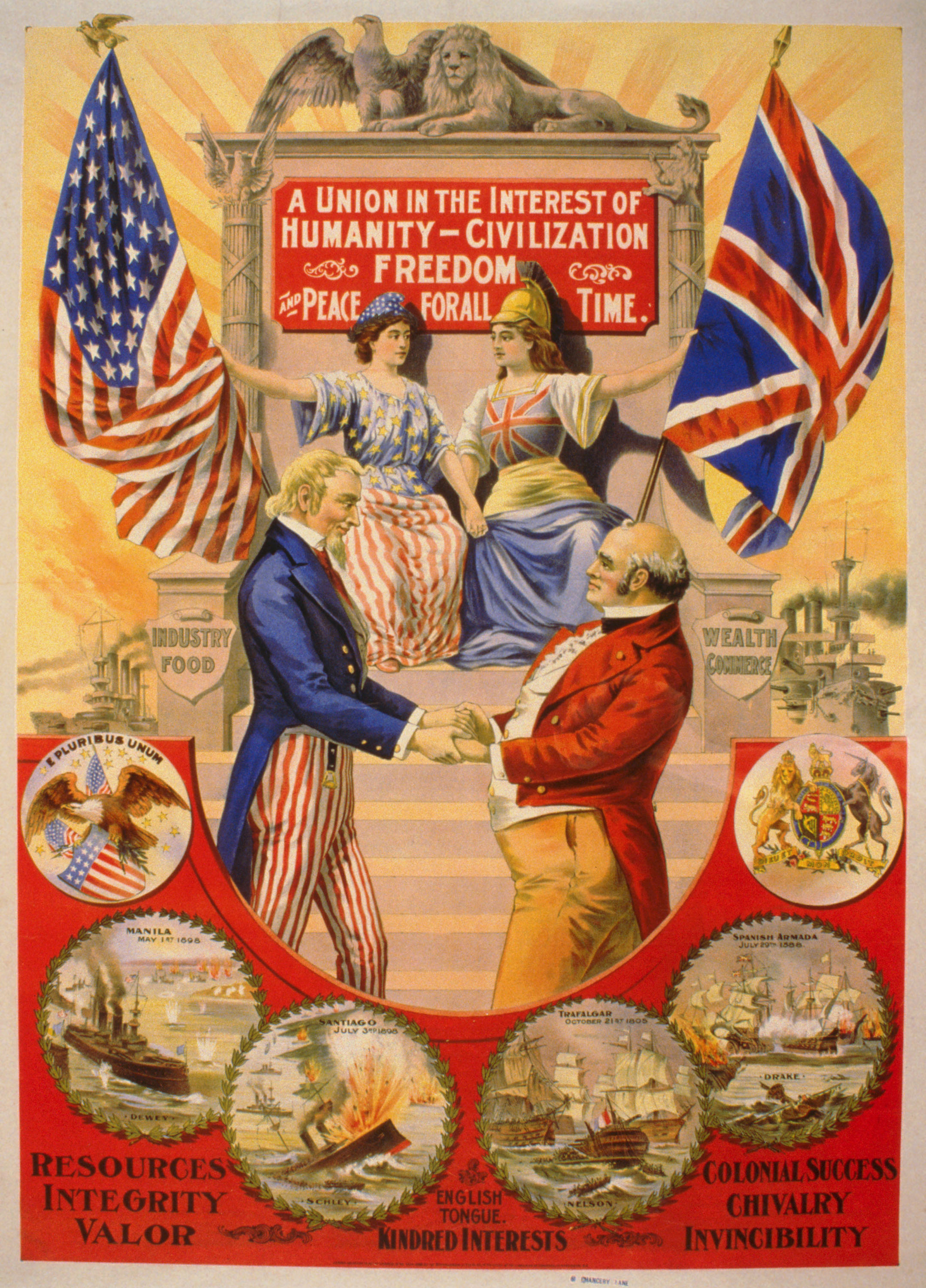
Uncle Sam embracing John Bull, while Britannia and Columbia hold hands and sit together in the background (1898).

During the colonial era, British colonists enslaved African Americans and transported black individuals to the United States.

==== Immigration after 1776 ====
British immigration to the U.S. 1820–2000
Period	Arrivals	Period	Arrivals	Period	Arrivals
1820–1830	27,489	1901–1910	525,950	1981–1990	159,173
1831–1840	75,810	1911–1920	341,408	1991–2000	151,866
1841–1850	267,044	1921–1930	339,570		
1851–1860	423,974	1931–1940	31,572		
1861–1870	606,896	1941–1950	139,306		
1871–1880	548,043	1951–1960	202,824		
1881–1890	807,357	1961–1970	213,822		
1891–1900	271,538	1971–1980	137,374		
Total arrivals: 5,271,016

Nevertheless, longstanding cultural and historical ties have, in more modern times, resulted in the Special Relationship, the exceptionally close political, diplomatic and military co-operation of United Kingdom – United States relations. Linda Colley, a professor of history at Princeton University and specialist in Britishness, suggested that because of their strong colonial influence on the United States, the British find Americans a "mysterious and paradoxical people, physically distant but culturally close, engagingly similar yet irritatingly different".

For over two centuries (1789–2009) of early U.S. history, all Presidents with the exception of two (Van Buren and Kennedy) were descended from the varied colonial British stock, from the Pilgrims and Puritans to the Scotch-Irish and English who settled Appalachia, with more recent presidents such as Joe Biden and Donald Trump having partial British ancestry.

== Cultural contributions ==
Much of American culture shows influences from nation states of British culture. Colonial ties to Great Britain spread the English language, legal system and other cultural attributes. Historian David Hackett Fischer has posited that four major streams of immigration from the British Isles in the colonial era contributed to the formation of a new American culture, summarized as follows:

- East Anglia to New England – The Exodus of the English Puritans (Pilgrims and Puritans influenced the Northeastern United States' corporate and educational culture)
- The South of England to the lowland South – The Cavaliers and Indentured Servants (Gentry influenced the Southern United States' plantation culture)
- Northern England to the Delaware Valley – The Friends' Migration (Quakers influenced the Middle Atlantic and Midwestern United States' industrial culture)
- The Scottish Lowlands to the Backcountry – The Flight from North Britain (Scotch-Irish, of lowland Scottish and border English descent, influenced the Western United States' ranch culture and the Southern United States' common agrarian culture)

Fischer's theory acknowledges the presence of other groups of immigrants during the colonial period, both from the British Isles (the Welsh and the Highland Scots) and not (Germans, Dutch, and French Huguenots), but believes that these did not culturally contribute as substantially to the United States as his main four.

=== Historical influence ===
Apple pie – New England was the first region to experience large-scale English colonization in the early 17th century, beginning in 1620, and it was dominated by East Anglian Calvinists, better known as the Puritans. Baking was a particular favorite of the New Englanders and was the origin of dishes seen today as quintessentially "American", such as apple pie and the oven-roasted Thanksgiving turkey. "As American as apple pie" is a well-known phrase used to suggest that something is all-American.

=== Automakers ===
Buick – David Dunbar Buick was a Scottish-born American, a Detroit-based inventor, best known for founding the Buick Motor Company.

=== Motorcycle manufacturer ===
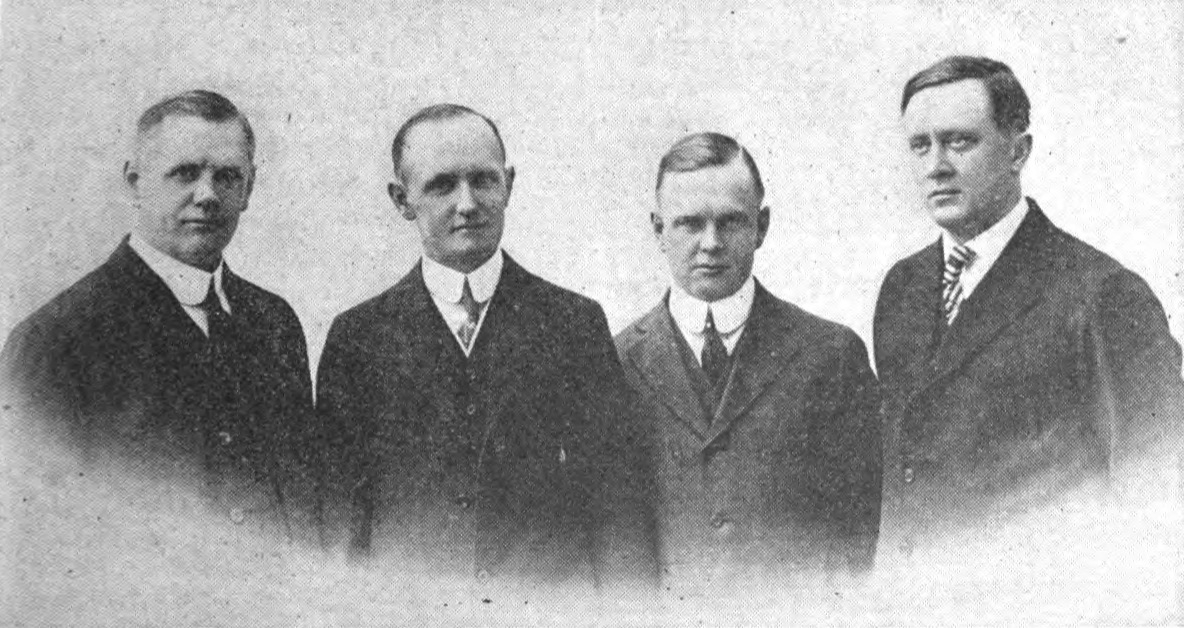
Founders of Harley-Davidson, from left: William A. Davidson, Walter Davidson Sr., Arthur Davidson and William S. Harley.

Harley-Davidson – The Davidson brothers were of Scottish descent (William. A., Walter and Arthur Davidson) and William S. Harley of English descent. Along with Indian Motorcycle Manufacturing Company was the largest and most recognizable American motorcycle manufacturer.

=== Sports ===
Baseball – The earliest recorded game of base-ball for which the original source survives, involved the family of George II of Great Britain, played indoors in London in November 1748. The Prince is reported as playing "Bass-Ball" again in September 1749 in Walton-on-Thames, Surrey, against Lord Middlesex. The English lawyer William Bray wrote in his diary that he had played a game of baseball on Easter Monday 1755 in Guildford, also in Surrey. English lawyer William Bray recorded a game of baseball on Easter Monday 1755 in Guildford, Surrey; Bray's diary was verified as authentic in September 2008. This early form of the game was apparently brought to North America by British immigrants. The first appearance of the term that exists in print was in "A Little Pretty Pocket-Book" in 1744, where it is called Base-Ball. Today, rounders, which has been played in England since Tudor times, holds a similarity to baseball. Although, literary references to early forms of "base-ball" in the United Kingdom pre-date use of the term "rounders".

In addition to baseball, American football is a sport that developed from soccer and Rugby, which are both sports that originated in the British Isles.

Bowling or ten-pin bowling derived from Nine-Pins (nine-pin bowling) brought over by early British settlers.

=== Continental Colors, 1775–1777 ===
The "Continental Union Flag" which served as the U.S. national flag from 1776 to 1777; the thirteen stripes represent the original Thirteen Colonies.

The Continental Union Flag is considered to be the first national flag of the United States. The design consisted of 13 stripes, red and white, representing the original Thirteen Colonies, the canton on the upper left-hand corner bearing the British Union Flag, the red cross of St. George of England with the white cross of St. Andrew of Scotland. The flag was first flown on December 2, 1775, by John Paul Jones (then a Continental Navy lieutenant) on the ship Alfred in Philadelphia).

== Place names ==
=== Alabama ===
- Birmingham after Birmingham, England
- Oxford after Oxford, England
- Montgomery after Montgomery, Powys, Wales

=== California ===
- Westminster after Westminster in London, England
- Exeter after Exeter, England
- Windsor after Windsor, Berkshire, in England

=== Colorado ===
- Aberdeen Ghost town named after Aberdeen in Scotland
- Derby after Derby, England
- Rugby after Rugby in England

=== Connecticut ===
- Essex, Connecticut after Essex, England
- Greenwich, Connecticut after Greenwich, England
- Manchester, Connecticut after Manchester, England
- New London, Connecticut after London, England
- Norfolk, Connecticut after Norfolk, England

=== Delaware ===
- Dover after Dover, England
- Kent County, Delaware after Kent, England
- Wilmington named by Proprietor Thomas Penn after his friend Spencer Compton, Earl of Wilmington, who was prime minister in the reign of George II of Great Britain.

=== Florida ===
- Windermere, named for Windermere, Westmorland, the largest lake of the Lake District and England

=== Kentucky ===
- Cumberland County, town, river, falls, mountains, National Park and lake after

historic county in England now part of Cumbria, and also the Duke of Cumberland

- Glasgow, Kentucky after

Glasgow, Scotland

- London, Kentucky after

London, England

=== Maine ===
- Leeds after Leeds, England

=== Maryland ===
- Aberdeen, Maryland after Aberdeenshire, Scotland
- Chester, Maryland after Chester, England
- Chestertown, Maryland after Chester, England
- Essex, Maryland after Essex, England
- Glencoe, Maryland after Glencoe, Scotland
- Hereford, Maryland after Hereford, England
- Kensington, Maryland after Kensington, England
- Manchester, Maryland after Manchester, England
- Olney, Maryland after Olney, England
- Westminster, Maryland after Westminster, England
- Salisbury, Maryland after Salisbury, England

=== Massachusetts ===
- Abington, Massachusetts after Abingdon, England
- Attleboro, Massachusetts after Attleborough, England
- Bedford, Massachusetts after Bedford, England
- Boston after Boston, England
- Cambridge after the City of Cambridge, England
- Charlton, Massachusetts after Charlton, London, England
- Chelsea, Massachusetts after Chelsea, England
- Falmouth, Massachusetts after Falmouth, England
- Gloucester after Gloucester and Gloucestershire, England
- Hampshire County, Massachusetts after Hampshire, England
- Mansfield, Massachusetts after Mansfield, England
- Middlesex County, Massachusetts after Middlesex, England
- Plymouth, Massachusetts after Plymouth, England
- Somerset, Massachusetts after Somerset, England
- Southampton after Southampton, England
- Suffolk County, Massachusetts after Suffolk, England
- Swansea, Massachusetts after Swansea, Wales
- Taunton, Massachusetts after Taunton, England
- Weymouth, Massachusetts after Weymouth, Dorset, England
- Worcester, Massachusetts after Worcester, England

=== Michigan ===
- Birmingham after Birmingham, England
- Plymouth after Plymouth, England

=== New Hampshire ===
- New Hampshire state (after Hampshire)
- Derry, New Hampshire after Derry, Northern Ireland
- Durham, New Hampshire after Durham, England
- Exeter, New Hampshire after Exeter, England
- Londonderry, New Hampshire after Londonderry, Northern Ireland
- Manchester after Manchester, England
- New London, New Hampshire after London, England
- Nottingham, New Hampshire after Nottinghamshire
- Plymouth, New Hampshire after Plymouth, England
- Portsmouth, New Hampshire after Portsmouth, England

=== New Jersey ===
- New Jersey and Jersey City after Jersey

=== New York ===
- New York and New York City after York, England
- Albany after the Duke of Albany

=== North Carolina ===
- Durham, North Carolina and Durham County, North Carolina after Durham, England
- Halifax, North Carolina and Halifax County, North Carolina after Halifax, England
- Brunswick County, North Carolina after House of Brunswick
- New Hanover County, North Carolina after House of Hanover
- Northampton County, North Carolina after Northampton, England
- Richmond County, North Carolina after Richmond, London

=== Ohio ===
- Kendal, Ohio after Kendal, Westmorland.
- Liverpool, Medina County Ohio and East Liverpool, Ohio, after Liverpool, England.

=== Pennsylvania ===
- Bucks County after Buckinghamshire, England
- Chester County and Chester after Chester, England
- Carlisle, Pennsylvania after Carlisle, England
- Darby derived from Derby (pronounced "Darby"), the county town of Derbyshire (pronounced "Darbyshire")
- Lancaster County and Lancaster after the city of Lancaster in the county of Lancashire in England, the native home of John Wright, one of the early settlers.
- Reading, Berks County after Reading, Berkshire, England
- Warminster after a small town in the county of Wiltshire, at the western extremity of Salisbury Plain, England.
- York, Pennsylvania after York, England

=== Texas ===
- Bronte, named for English novelist Charlotte Brontë (1816–1855).
- Cheapside, after Cheapside, a London street.
- Derby, after Derby, England.
- Liverpool, after Liverpool, a port city traditionally in Lancashire, England.
- Newcastle, after Newcastle upon Tyne, northeast England.

=== Utah ===
- Leeds after Leeds, England

=== Virginia ===
- Crewe, Virginia after Crewe, England
- Dumfries, Virginia after Dumfries, Scotland
- Edinburg, Virginia after Edinburgh, Scotland
- Falmouth, Virginia after Falmouth, England
- Isle of Wight County, Virginia after Isle of Wight, England
- Kilmarnock, Virginia after Kilmarnock, Scotland
- Glasgow, Virginia after Glasgow, Scotland
- Gloucester, Virginia after Gloucester, England
- Richmond, Virginia and Richmond County, Virginia after Richmond, London
- Lancaster County, Virginia after Lancashire, England
- Hampton, Virginia after Hampton, London, England
- Midlothian, Virginia after Midlothian, Scotland
- New Kent County, Virginia after Kent County, England
- Norfolk, Virginia after Norfolk, England
- Northampton County, Virginia after Northampton, England
- Northumberland County, Virginia after Northumberland, England
- Portsmouth, Virginia after Portsmouth, England
- Stafford, Virginia after Stafford, England
- Suffolk, Virginia after Suffolk, England
- Westmoreland County, Virginia after Westmoreland (now part of Cumbria, England)
- Winchester, Virginia after Winchester, England

=== Wisconsin ===
- Chilton, Wisconsin, from Chillington Hall, Staffordshire, the British ancestral home of an early settler.
- Ripon, Wisconsin, after Ripon, North Yorkshire, the British ancestral home city of one of its earliest settlers, John S. Horner.

In addition, some places were named after the kings and queens of the former kingdoms of England and Ireland. The name Virginia was first applied by Queen Elizabeth I (the "Virgin Queen") and Sir Walter Raleigh in 1584., the Carolinas were named after King Charles I and Maryland named so for his wife, Queen Henrietta Maria (Queen Mary). The Borough of Queens in New York was named after Catherine of Braganza (Queen Catherine), the wife of the King Charles II.

== See also ==
- Americans in the United Kingdom
- Anglo-Americans
- Anglo-Celtic Australians
- Britons in Mexico
- Cornish Americans
  - List of Cornish Americans
- English Americans
  - List of English Americans
- English diaspora
- Hyphenated American
- Irish Americans
  - List of Irish Americans
- Manx Americans
  - List of Manx Americans
- Scotch-Irish Americans
  - List of Scots-Irish Americans
- Scottish Americans
  - List of Scottish Americans
- Welsh Americans
  - List of Welsh Americans
- White Anglo-Saxon Protestants, called WASPs
- United Kingdom–United States relations

== Scholarly sources ==
- Berthoff, Rowland Tappan (1953). British Immigrants in Industrial America, 1790–1950.
- Bridenbaugh, Carl. Vexed and Troubled Englishmen, 1590–1642 (1976).
- Colley, Linda (1992), Britons: Forging the Nation, 1701–1837, Yale University Press, ISBN 978-0-300-05737-9
- Ember, Carol R.; et al. (2004). Encyclopedia of Diasporas: Immigrant and Refugee Cultures Around the World. Springer. ISBN 978-0-306-48321-9.
- Erickson, Charlotte. Invisible Immigrants: The Adaptation of English and Scottish Immigrants in Nineteenth-Century America (1972_.
- Fischer, David Hackett (1989). Albion's Seed: Four British Folkways In America.
- Furer, Howard B., ed. The British in America: 1578–1970 (1972).
- Handlin, Oscar (1980). Orlov, Ann; Thernstrom, Stephan (eds.). Harvard Encyclopedia of American Ethnic Groups. the standard reference source for all ethnic groups.
- McGill, David W., and John K. Pearce. "American families with English ancestors from the colonial era: Anglo Americans." in Ethnicity and family therapy (1996): 451–466; reviews modern social psychology of family types.
- Marshall, Peter James (2001). The Cambridge Illustrated History of the British Empire. Cambridge University Press. ISBN 978-0-521-00254-7.
- Shepperson, Wilbur S. British emigration to North America: projects and opinions in the early Victorian period (1957), examines opinion in Britain. online
- Tennenhouse, Leonard. The Importance of Feeling English: American Literature and the British Diaspora, 1750–1850 (2007).
- Van Vugt, William E. "British (English, Scottish, Scots Irish, and Welsh) and British Americans, 1870–1940’." in Elliott Barkan, ed., Immigrants in American History: Arrival, Adaptation, and Integration (2013): 4:237+.
- Van Vugt, William E. British Buckeyes: The English, Scots, and Welsh in Ohio, 1700–1900 (2006).
