= Jerome Bonaparte Squier =

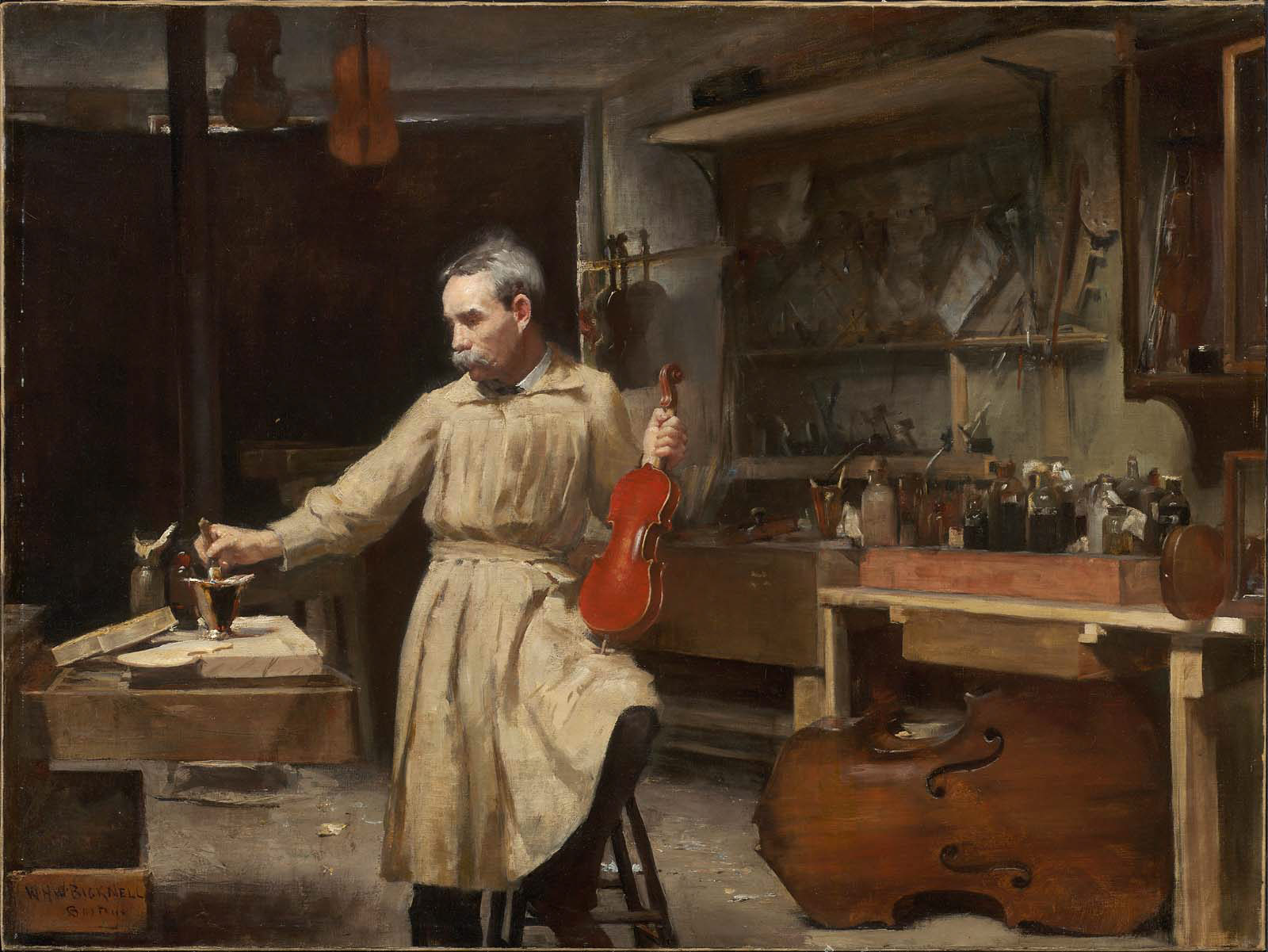
The Violin Maker, a portrait of Squier in 1888 by William H. W. Bicknell (Museum of Fine Arts, Boston)

Jerome Bonaparte Squier (1838 – 1 June 1912) was a British-American luthier.

"J.B." Squier was an English immigrant who arrived in Battle Creek, Michigan in the latter part of the 19th century. A farmer and shoemaker who had learned the fine European art of violin making, he moved to Boston, Massachusetts in 1881 where he built and repaired violins with his son, Victor Carroll (V.C.) Squier. Squier made 600 instruments during his career. He made his own amber-brown, lustrous varnish. Among his notable violins were a dozen violins each named after one of the twelve apostles. Other instruments were named after George Washington and Abraham Lincoln. Most of his violins were patterned after Stradivarius, notably the Alard Stradivarius. The tonal quality of Squier's violins was brilliant and clear. Squier taught the art of violin making to Charles Kinney, father of Edward Kinney. In 2007, the owner of one of Squier's violins claimed that it had an estimated worth of US$100,000 because of its tonal quality. However, this is unlikely, as the auction record for this maker is $11,400 in May 2010, for a viola.

Squier married Olive Brown Raymond and the couple had three children. One of their children, Victor Carroll Squier, also went on to work in violin-making and became renowned for his violins and violin strings.

The Squier company went on to manufacture violin, banjo and guitar strings and was acquired by Fender in 1965.
