= Rugby station =

Rugby station or Rugby railway station may refer to:

- Rugby railway station, a railway station in Rugby, Warwickshire, England
- Rugby Central railway station, a former railway station in Rugby, Warwickshire
- Rugby Parkway railway station, a proposed new station to be built on the edge of Rugby, Warwickshire
- Rugby Radio Station, a radio transmission station in Hillmorton, Warwickshire
- Rugby Road Halt, a former railway halt in London, England.
- Rugby station (North Dakota), an Amtrak station in Rugby, North Dakota, US
- Rugby station (Boston), a former railway station in Boston, Massachusetts, US

== See also ==
- Rugby (disambiguation)
