= 2021 Rugby League World Cup final =

The 2021 Rugby League World Cup final may refer to:

- 2021 Men's Rugby League World Cup final, a rugby league match to determine the winner of the 2021 Men's Rugby League World Cup
- 2021 Women's Rugby League World Cup final, a rugby league match to determine the winner of the 2021 Women's Rugby League World Cup
- 2021 Wheelchair Rugby League World Cup final, a rugby league match to determine the winner of the 2021 Wheelchair Rugby League World Cup
- 2021 Physical Disability Rugby League World Cup final, a rugby league match to determine the winner of the 2021 Physical Disability Rugby League World Cup

== See also ==
- 2021 Rugby League World Cup (disambiguation)
