= Edward Kinney =

American luthier

Edward Kinney (1859–1933) was an American luthier active in Springfield, Massachusetts. He was born in Northampton, Massachusetts, and learned the art of violin making from his father, Charles Kinney, who had previously learned the craft from Andrew Hyde and J.B. Squier. Edward Kinney identified his instruments with an Art Nouveau printed label with a black, decorative background. Edward Kinney made over 200 violins during his career.
