= Kneen =

Origin
- Languages: Gaelic. (3 possible origins); 1. from Mac Niadháin; 2. from Mac Cianain; 3. from Naomh
- Meaning: 3 possible meanings 1. "champion" (from the Gaelic Nia); 2. "long" (from the Gaelic cian); 3. "a saint" (from the Gaelic Naomh)
- Region of origin: Isle of Man

Kneen, (pronounced "neen" with the 'K' silent), is a Manx surname. There have been several interpretations of the origin of the surname. Kneen may be an Anglicisation of the Gaelic patronymic Mac Niadháin, which is derived from a pet form of the Gaelic personal name Nia meaning "champion". Another origin attributed to the surname is that Kneen may be derived from the Gaelic Mac Cianain, meaning "son of Cianan". The name Cianan being a diminutive of cian, meaning "long". Another opinion published in the 19th century is that Kneen is possibly a corruption of the surname Nevyn, and derived from the Gaelic Naomh meaning "a saint". This origin has been attributed to the name because Kneen had been thought to be confused in early documents with the surnames Nevyn and Nevyne. An Andrew John Nevyn is recorded in 1417. A Jenkin M'Nyne is recorded in 1429, and later in 1430 his name is recorded as Jenkine Mac Nevyne.

== As a surname ==
- Dan Kneen, (1987–2018), motorcycle racer
- Edgar Kneen, Australian footballer
- John Kneen, (1873–1938), Manx linguist
- Krissy Kneen, Australian bookseller and writer
- Steve Kneen, Australian rugby player
- Thomas Kneen, (1852–1916), Manx, His Majesty's Clerk of the Rolls for the Isle of Man

== See also ==
- McNee (disambiguation), derived from the Gaelic Mac Niadh, which is the patronymic form of the Gaelic personal name Nia.
- McNiven, derived from the Gaelic Mac Naoimhín.
- Nevin, sometimes derived from the Gaelic Mac Naoimhín.
