= Women's rugby =

Women's rugby may refer to:

- Women's rugby league
- Women's rugby sevens
- Women's rugby union

== See also ==
- Comparison of rugby league and rugby union
- Rugby (disambiguation)
- Women's football (disambiguation)
