= 2021 Rugby League World Cup squads =

The 2021 Rugby League World Cup squads may refer to:

- 2021 Men's Rugby League World Cup squads, sixteen international twenty-four-man squads competing in the men's competition
- 2021 Women's Rugby League World Cup squads, eight international twenty-four-woman squads competing in the women's competition
- 2021 Wheelchair Rugby League World Cup squads, eight international twelve-man squads competing in the wheelchair competition
- 2021 Physical Disability Rugby League World Cup squads, four international squads competing in the physical disability competition

== See also ==
- 2021 Rugby League World Cup (disambiguation)
- 2021 Rugby League World Cup qualification
