= Women's football =

Women's football most often refers to:

- Women's association football

Women's football may also refer to:

- Women's gridiron football
- Women's Australian rules football
- Ladies' Gaelic football
- Women's rugby league
- Women's rugby union
- Women's rugby sevens

== See also ==
- Women's rugby (disambiguation)
- Football (disambiguation)
- Football, for a historic comparison of the various codes
  - Comparison of association football and rugby union
  - Comparison of American and Canadian football
  - Comparison of Gaelic football and Australian rules football
