= John Cubbins =

American politician

John Cubbins (c. 1827 – c. 1894) was an American businessman from Memphis, Tennessee who served in the Tennessee State Senate during the 36th Tennessee General Assembly (1869-1871) as a "Labor Democrat". He also went by the name John Cubbin in many legal documents as this was the original Manx spelling. Adding the "s" was an attempt at Americanising the name.

== Background ==
Originally from the Isle of Man, Cubbins was a businessman whose Memphis-based brickyard John Cubbins & Co. opened a niter works in Searcy County, Arkansas in 1861 after the outbreak of the American Civil War, when gunpowder was in high demand.

== In the Senate ==
He was elected from the 25th Senate District (Fayette and Shelby counties), and was assigned to the standing committees on finance, ways and means; on internal improvements; on the penitentiary; and on agriculture and manufactures. He supported the election of Democrat Henry Cooper over former President of the United States Andrew Johnson as U.S. Senator in 1869.

== After the Senate ==
He was president of the Memphis Water Company during the era of the yellow fever epidemics which depopulated the city.

In January 1897, his son J. F. Cubbins, executor of his estate, advertised in a union magazine, seeking to find Cubbins' other son Thomas (a railroad engineer). At that time, J.F. states that John had died "two years ago".
