= McNee =

McNee or Macnee is a surname. Notable people with the surname include:

- Andrew McNee (born 1974), Canadian actor
- Chris McNee 1914–1986), Scottish footballer
- Daniel Macnee (1806–1882) Scottish painter
- David McNee (born 1925) former commissioner of the Metropolitan Police and Chief Constable of City of Glasgow Police
- Dorothea Macnee (1896–1984) British socialite and mother of Patrick Macnee
- Gerry McNee, Scottish football journalist
- John McNee (diplomat) (born 1951) Canadian diplomat
- Jack McNee, Scottish footballer in the late 19th and early 20th century
- Lorna McNee, Scottish chef
- Mark McNee (born 1981) Australian short track speed skater
- Patrick Macnee (1922–2015) British-American actor

== See also ==
- McNee Ranch State Park
