= Callow (band) =

American band

- Origin: San Francisco, California
- Genres: indie rock, slowcore, minimal, psychedelic folk, experimental rock
- Years active: 2009–present
- Label: NXNW Records
- Spinoff of: badapple
- Members: Gared Moses; Sami Knowles
- Website: callowmusic.com

Callow is a Dream Doom duo based in the San Francisco Bay Area. Its members are Gared Moses (vocals, guitar) and Sami Knowles (drums, keyboard, vocals). They are known for their dark and doom-y music, and evocative live shows.

== History ==
Gared (a.k.a. Red) Moses was born in Vancouver, Washington, and moved to Salt Lake City, Utah, with his family as a youth. He began writing and playing music at a young age, and in college he wrote scores for theater productions at Salt Lake Community College. For several years he operated and co-owned Ruby Records (2000–2005), and wrote for the Indie Music Spotlight (a monthly column in Salt Lake Underground Magazine).

Former badapple singer/songwriter, Gared Moses, formed Callow while in Salt Lake City and enjoyed moderate success before moving to San Francisco, where he met Sami Knowles. They reformed Callow as a duo and began playing together in the fall of 2009.

Their first album, Orb Weaver, was recorded and mixed by themselves and various friends while touring and travelling. It was released on Portland-based indie label NXNW Records in May 2012. SLUG Magazine compared it to The Velvet Underground, saying, "what punk rock would have been had it evolved from The Velvet Underground's airy slowness rather than their minimalism." The song "Old Horse" was voted "Best Song" by Noise Pop voters in the San Francisco Music Video Race 2013.

Their second album, Blue Spells, was recorded live to magnetic tape in their home studio, and was released on cassette by NXNW Records. The San Francisco Chronicle described it as "haunting and beautiful, with angst and tension balanced with primal minimalism."

Blues Spells was premiered by Surviving the Golden Age, and ranked in the top five in a Magnet (magazine) poll. Moses' vocals were compared to a "tortured and slowcore-laden doppelganger of Adam Stephens of Two Gallants."

The Single "Strange" was premiered by The Vinyl District, and was Song of the Day on KDHX radio. The single "Philosophy" was premiered by Mad Mackerel, and described as "a sweetly sombre classic of pensive restraint and yearning melancholy that leaves palpable echoes hanging in the air long after the song has finished." Songs "Black" and "The Heavy Sermon" were mixed by Brandon Eggleston (sound engineer for Swans, The Mountain Goats, Tune-Yards). The rest of the album was mixed by Rob Bartleson and Yarn F Miners at Haywire Records in Portland.

Their 2013/2014 Blue Spells tour included official showcases at Sled Island and CMJ, and several shows at SXSW.

2018 saw the release of the third album, Mothdust, on vinyl. The Bay Bridged noted that: "all their previous releases have a certain degree of grit, but their confidence and chops are really on display here."

== Members ==
- Gared Moses - vocals, guitar
- Sami Knowles - drums, keyboard, vocals

=== Former Members ===
- Tim Watson - bass
- Tony Esterbrooks - drums
- Branden Jenkins - drums
- Rob Goodson - guitar (Warm Soda, Thought Riot)

=== Collaborators ===
- Brandon Eggleston - mixing, Blue Spells & Mothdust
- Sammy Fielding (Ancient Owl) - recording & mixing, Mothdust
- Pall Jenkins - musical saw (The Black Heart Procession, Three Mile Pilot)
- Joey Chang - cello (CelloJoe)
- David Conway - recording & mixing, Orb Weaver
- Alex Laipenieks - recording & mixing, EP
- Mike Stone - recording & mixing, Orb Weaver

== Discography ==
=== Albums ===
- Orb Weaver (May 3, 2012) - CD, Download
- Blue Spells (Nov 19, 2013) - CD, Cassette, Download
- Mothdust (Oct 19, 2018) - Vinyl, Download

=== EPs ===
- Self-Titled (June, 2010) - out of print

=== Singles ===
- "Always About The Ones Who Have It All" (Jan 20, 2017)
- "Go Down" (May 18, 2017)
- "Strange" (August 30, 2013) - Download
- "Philosophy" - (October 24, 2013) - Download
