= Rugby, Boston =

1894 residential development in Boston, Massachusetts

Rugby
- Residential development
- Interactive map of Rugby
- Coordinates: 42°16′07″N 71°06′12″W
- Country: United States
- State: Massachusetts
- City: Boston
- Neighborhoods: Mattapan; Hyde Park
- Developed: 1894
- Founder: Wood, Harmon & Co.

Area
  - Total: 60 acres (24 ha)

Rugby was a 1894 residential development of 60 acres straddling the border between what was then the western section of the Dorchester district of Boston and the eastern part of the town of Hyde Park, Massachusetts. Described by the developer Wood, Harmon & Co. as a "new Dorchester suburb, commands fine views of Blue Hills", the area was purchased from the estate of Charles L. Flint and others. The area is now part of the Boston neighborhoods of Mattapan and Hyde Park.

== Streets ==
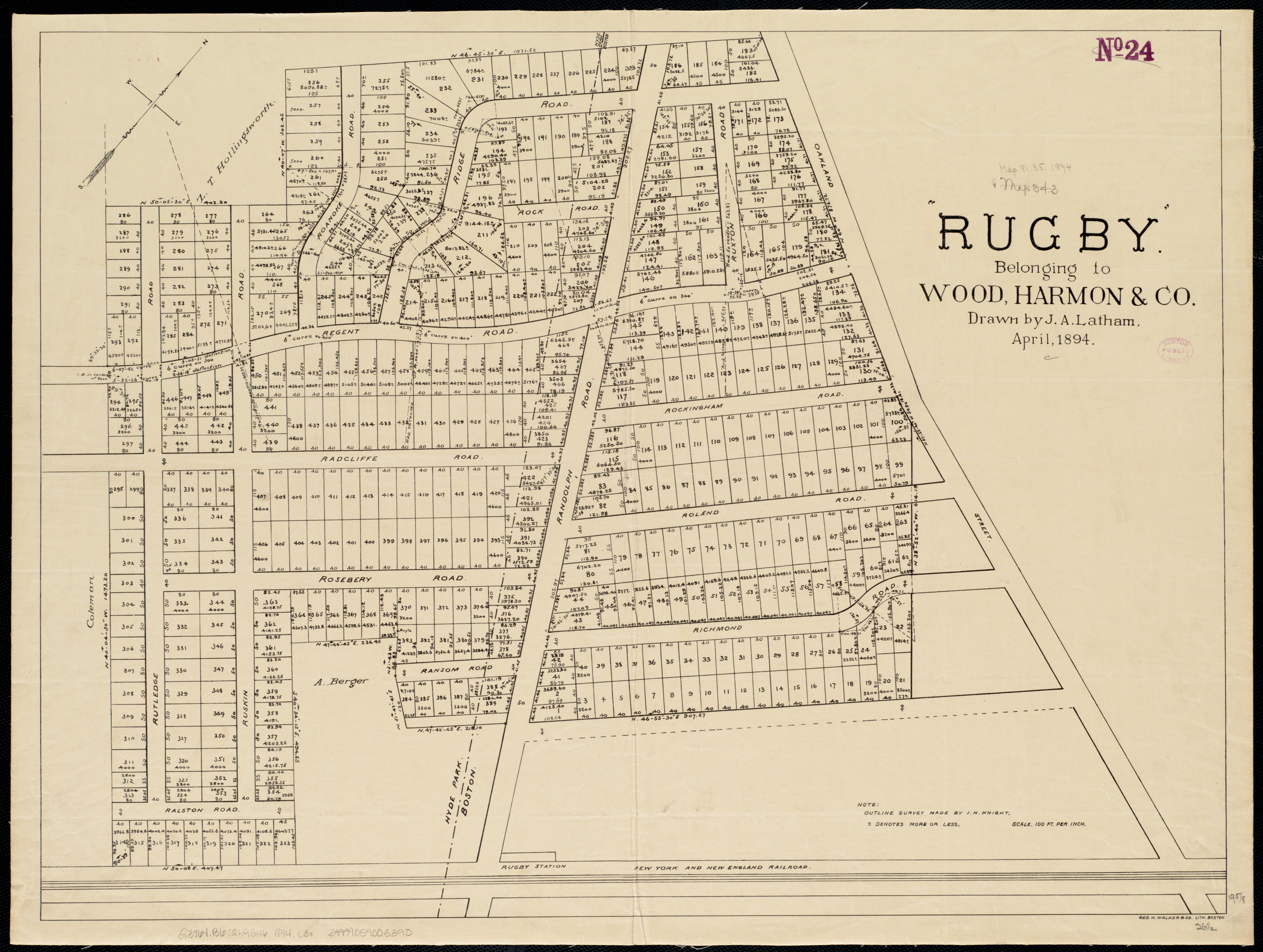
1894 plan for Rugby

A unique alliterative feature of Rugby was that each street was designated a road and began with the letter "R". Many of these streets have since been renamed:

- Radcliff Road
- Ralston Road
- Randolph Road (Greenfield Road)
- Ransom Road (Randley Road)
- Regent Road (Blake Street/Rugby Road)
- Richmond Road (Richmere Road)
- Ridge Road (Ridlon Road)
- Roanoke Road (Mariposa Street)
- Rock Road
- Rockingham Road
- Roland Road (Harmon Street)
- Rosebery Road (Roseberry Road)
- Ruskin Road (Ruskindale Road)
- Rutledge Road (Taunton Avenue)
- Ruxton Road

== Rugby station ==
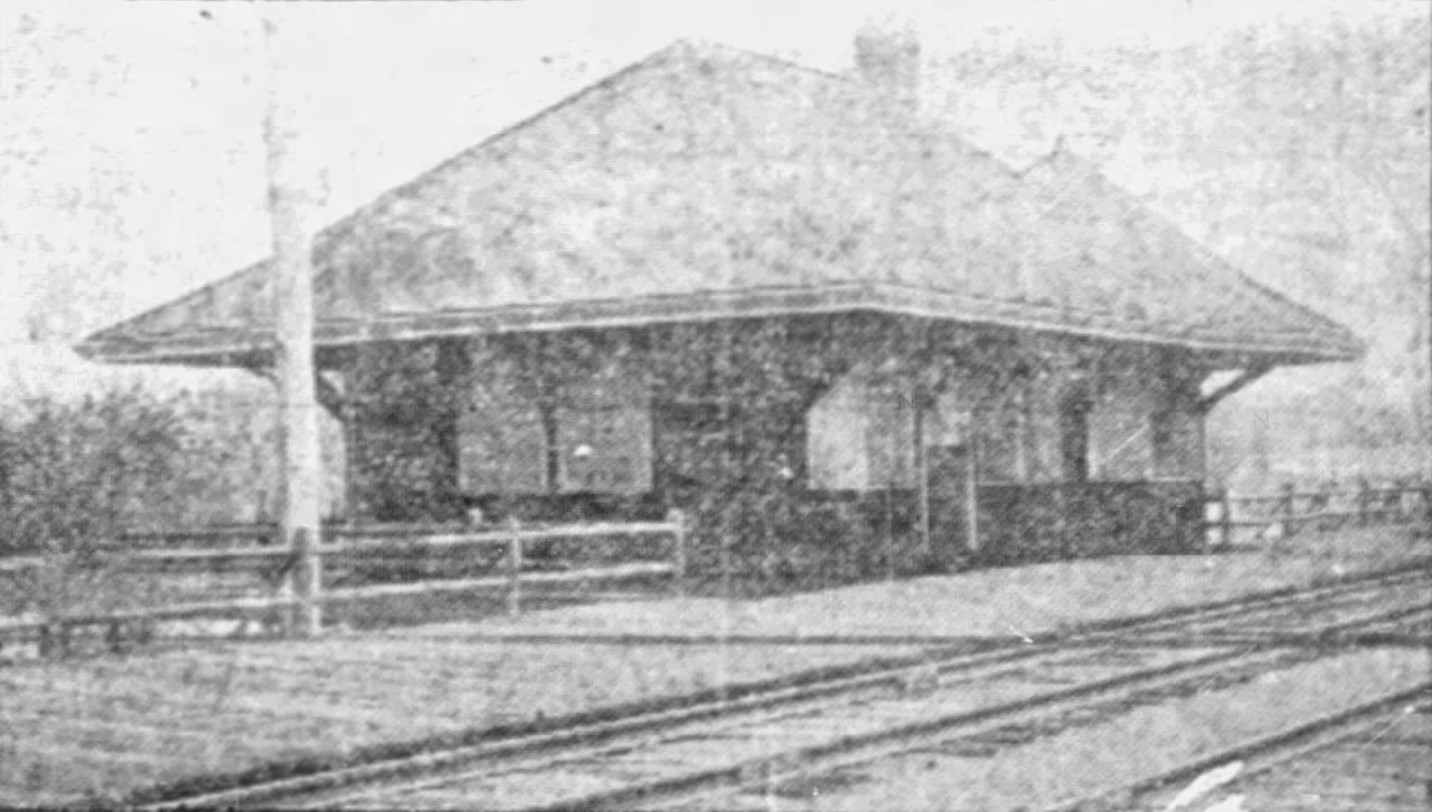
Rugby station in June 1906

A major selling point of the development was its close proximity to the New York and New England Railroad with access to downtown Boston. The developers constructed a station for the development and promised to pay the 5¢ fare to Boston for the head of the household until 1900. A temporary platform was used in April 1894 during sales of lots in the development. Rugby station was built later in 1894. It had a small wooden station building on the north station of the tracks just east of Randolph Road (now Greenfield Road), with two side platforms.

The station building was closed after a mere three months, but trains continued to stop. The disused building was damaged several times by fires – both accidental and intentional – and was destroyed on April 24, 1908, by a fire caused by sparks from a passing locomotive. With the station building gone, only the platforms remained. Rugby was served by only a single train in one direction by 1915, and abandoned entirely by 1924. A pedestrian underpass was built between Greenfield Road and Rector Road (both formerly Randolph Road) at the former station site in 1932. Passenger service on the line ran until 1944 and resumed in 1979; it is now the Fairmount Line of the MBTA Commuter Rail system.

== See also ==
- Neighborhoods in Boston, Massachusetts
