= Rugby, Colorado =

Unincorporated community in Las Animas County, CO, USA

Coordinates: 37°28′12″N 104°39′54″W

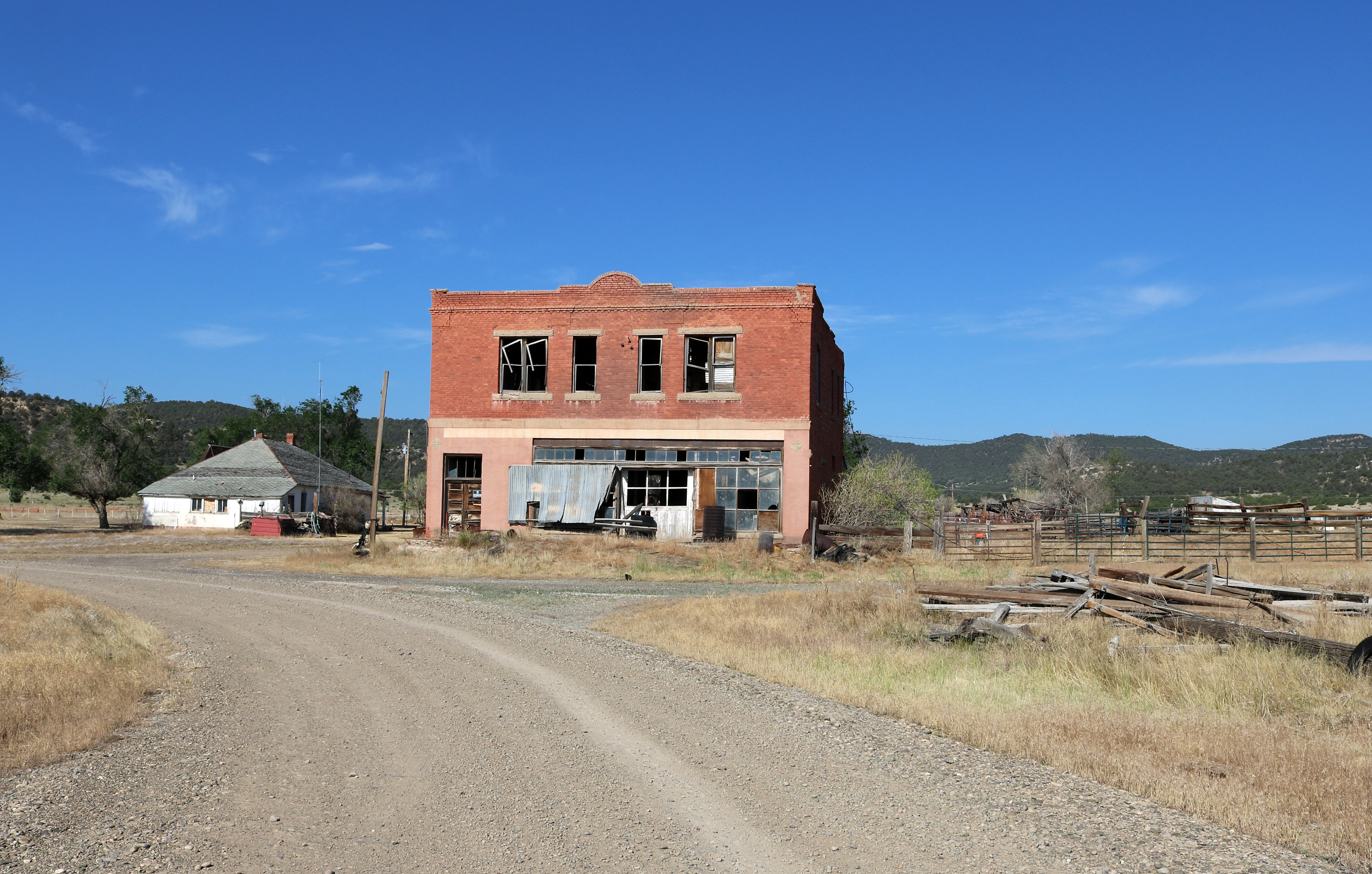
Rugby in 2018

Rugby is an unincorporated community in Las Animas County, in the U.S. state of Colorado.

== History ==
A post office called Rugby was established in 1900, and remained in operation until 1947. The community was named after Rugby, in England, the native land of a local mining official.
