= Callow (surname) =

Callow is an English surname. Notable people with the surname include:

- Christos Callow (born 1955), Greek singer
- Eleanor Callow (1927–1974), Canadian baseball player
- Henry Callow (died 2006), Manx judge
- Keith M. Callow (1925–2008), Associate Justice of the Washington Supreme Court
- Kenneth Callow (1901–1983), British biochemist
- Paul Callow (born c. 1955), convicted Canadian rapist
- Simon Callow (born 1949), English actor
- William Callow, (1812–1908), British painter
- William G. Callow (1921–2018), Associate Justice of the Wisconsin Supreme Court

== Fictional characters ==
- June Callow, fictional character in Black Mirror
- Michael Callow, fictional character in Black Mirror

== See also ==
- Charlie Calow (1931–2024), Northern Irish footballer
