= 2021 Wheelchair Rugby League World Cup =

International tournament

- Number of teams: 8
- Host country: England
- Winner: England (2nd title)
- Runner-up: France
- Matches played: 15
- Attendance: 19,450 (1,297 per match)
- Top try scorers: (France) Mostefa Abbasi (17) (England) Jack Brown (17)

The 2021 Wheelchair Rugby League World Cup was the fourth staging of the Wheelchair Rugby League World Cup, and was one of three major tournaments part of the 2021 Rugby League World Cup. The tournament was held in England from 3 November to 18 November 2022. It was originally planned to be held in November 2021 but was postponed due to the COVID-19 pandemic in England. It was the first occasion on which the wheelchair rugby league competition took place concurrently with the men's and women's tournaments. The competition was also the first time that participants in the wheelchair tournament received the same participation fees as players in the other competitions and the first time that prize money was awarded.

The tournament was won by England who beat France 28–24 in the final on 18 November 2022.

== Teams ==
=== Qualification ===
England, as hosts, and France, as holders of the world cup were given automatic entry to the competition. Other nations were invited to submit entries and six were chosen against a range of criteria including current international and domestic infrastructure and plans for growth. The six nations selected to join England and France in the tournament are Australia, Norway, Scotland, Spain, United States and Wales. Norway was replaced by Ireland due to the former being unable to prepare sufficiently for the tournament due to COVID-19 pandemic related issues.

=== Draw ===
The teams were drawn into two groups of four. The two seeded teams were England (Group A) and France (Group B). The draw was made at Buckingham Palace on 16 January 2020. Teams from pool 1 were drawn by Prince Harry, Duke of Sussex, pool 2 was drawn by Katherine Grainger and pool 3 by Jason Robinson. Norway was replaced by Ireland after the draw. The fixtures were announced on 21 July 2020. All the games in the tournament were played as double headers.

Seeded	Pot 1	Pot 2	Pot 3
England; France	Australia; Wales	Spain; Scotland	Norway (Note: Norway was replaced by Ireland in March 2022.); United States

=== Squads ===
Each nation named 12-player squads to compete in the tournament.

== Venues ==
=== Stadium locations ===
The tournament was played at three venues, the Copper Box Arena in London was used for the Group A games, the English Institute of Sport, Sheffield hosted the Group B games as well as both semi-finals. These venues were confirmed when the revised schedule for the tournament was issued. The final was scheduled for the M&S Bank Arena in Liverpool but the postponement of the tournament from 2021 to 2022 resulted in a venue change with the final played in Manchester at Manchester Central.

London	Sheffield	Manchester
Copper Box Arena	English Institute of Sport	Manchester Central
Capacity: 7,481	Capacity: 1,350	Capacity: 10,900
2021 Wheelchair Rugby League World Cup is located in England

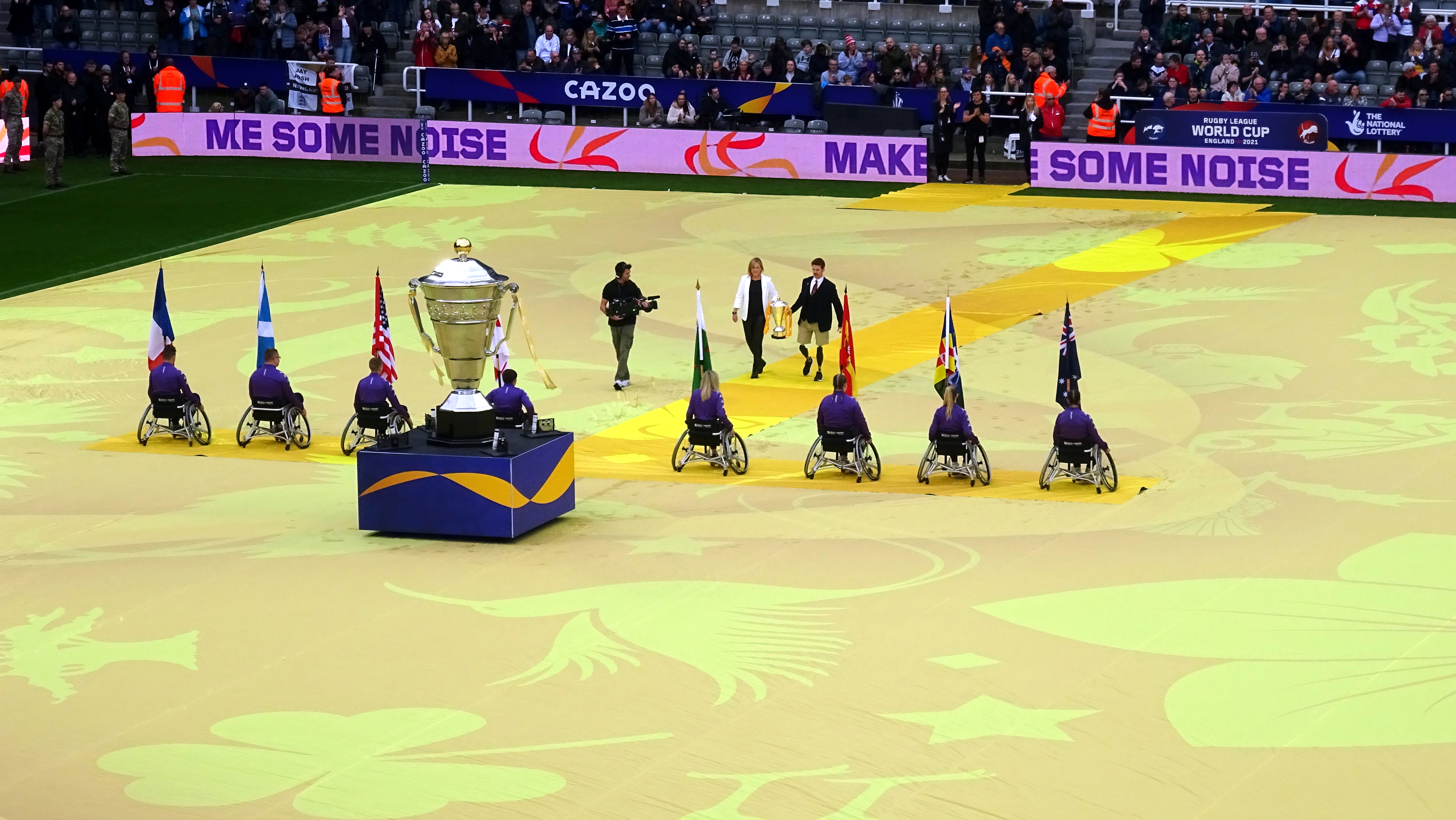
The Wheelchair trophy being brought out at the 2021 Rugby League Cup opening ceremony for all three tournaments

=== Team base camp locations ===
Two locations were used by the national squads to stay and train before and during the World Cup tournament;

- London: Australia, England, Norway and Spain
- Sheffield: France, Scotland, United States and Wales

== Officiating ==
The match officials for the tournament were announced on 5 October 2022.

- David Butler (England)
- David Roig (France)
- Grant Jackson (Wales)
- Kim Abel (Wales)
- Laurent Abrial (France)
- Matthew Ball (England)
- Ollie Cruickshank (Scotland)
- Steven Hewson (Australia)

== Warm-up matches ==
8 October 2022
14:00 BST (UTC+01:00)

Ireland	52–67	Wales
	Report

Calderdale Leisure Centre, Halifax

26 October 2022
14:00 BST (UTC+01:00)

British Army	v	Australia

Medway Park Sports Centre, Gillingham

29 October 2022
14:00 BST (UTC+01:00)

Wales	38–86	Australia
	Report

Cardiff Met University Cyncoed Campus, Cardiff

31 October 2022
14:00 BST (UTC+01:00)

Scotland	1–129	Australia
	Report

Medway Park Sports Centre, Gillingham

== Group stage ==
=== Group A ===
All six matches in group A were played at Copper Box Arena in London.

Pos	Team	Pld	W	D	L	PF	PA	PD	Pts	Qualification
1	England	3	3	0	0	263	20	+243	6	Advance to knockout stage
2	Australia	3	2	0	1	136	88	+48	4	Advance to knockout stage
3	Spain	3	1	0	2	99	188	−89	2	
4	Ireland	3	0	0	3	50	252	−202	0	

Source: rlwc2021

3 November 2022
17:00 GMT (UTC±00:00)

Ireland	32–55	Spain
Tries: Johnston (4) 31', 46', 50', 78'; Roberts 3'; McCarthy 65'; Goals: Johnston (4)	Report (RLWC); Report (ERL)	Tries: Lacombe 7'; Monedero 59'; Martin (2) 5', 62'; Gonzalez (2) 23', 69'; Berty (3) 9', 26', 45'; Goals: Gonzalez (8); Seron; Drop goals: Gonzalez

Copper Box Arena, London
Attendance: 3,033
Referees: Laurent Abrial (France), Kim Abel (Wales)
Touch judges: Matthew Ball (England), David Roig (France)
Player of the Match: Theo Gonzalez (Spain)

Team details
Ireland		Position	Spain
Name	Number	Position	Number	Name
Toby Burton-Carter	1	Starter	1	Joel Lacombe (c)
Peter Johnston Jnr	8	Starter	2	Raphael Monedero
Rick Rodgers	3	Starter	3	Yannick Martin
Phil Roberts	9	Starter	7	Theo Gonzalez
Tom Martin	2	Starter	5	David Berty
Paddy Forbes	5	Interchange	9	Eric Perez
Oran Spain	11	Interchange	4	David Raymond
Kenneth Maloney	6	Interchange	5	Jonathan Palomo
Stephen Campbell	4	Interchange	8	Wilfrid Seron
James McCarthy	10	Interchange	10	Pascal Ambrosino
Damian McCabe		Coach		Jean-Marc Gonzalez

3 November 2022
19:30 GMT (UTC±00:00)

England	38–8	Australia
Tries: Coyd (2) 19', 22'; Brown (2) 25', 35'; Collins (2) 32', 71'; King 47'; Goals: Hawkins; Collins (4)	Report (RLWC); Report (ERL)	Tries: Karim 10'; Goals: Karim; McKenna

Copper Box Arena, London
Attendance: 3,033
Referees: Ollie Cruickshank (Scotland), David Roig (France)
Touch judges: Kim Abel (Wales), Steven Hewson (Australia)
Player of the Match: Jack Brown (England)

Team details
England		Position	Australia
Name	Number	Position	Number	Name
Tom Halliwell (c)	7	Starter	1	Peter Arbuckle
Robert Hawkins	2	Starter	5	Cory Cannane
Joe Coyd	3	Starter	6	Brad Grove (c)
Sebastien Bechara	4	Starter	12	Diab Karim
Lewis King	5	Starter	5	Zac Schumacher
Jack Brown	6	Interchange	10	Craig Cannane
Nathan Collins	1	Interchange	4	James Hill
Adam Rigby	8	Interchange	2	Liam Luff
Declan Roberts	9	Interchange	11	Bayley McKenna
Wayne Boardman	10	Interchange	9	Adam Tannock
Tom Coyd		Coach		Brett Clark

6 November 2022
12:00 GMT (UTC±00:00)

England	104–12	Spain
Tries: Brown (2) 1', 6'; Simpson 13'; Boardman (2) 15', 33'; Halliwell 21'; Hawkins (5) 31', 37', 39', 70', 77'; Roberts (3) 41', 47', 74'; King 50'; Coyd (2) 57', 62'; Rigby 67'; Goals: Boardman (3/5); Collins (7/7); Roberts (6/6)	Report	Tries: Gonzalez 3'; Monedero 8'; Goals: Gonzalez (2/3)

Copper Box Arena, London
Attendance: 3,268
Referees: Kim Abel (Wales), Laurent Abriel (France)
Touch judges: David Roig (France), Grant Jackson (Wales)
Player of the Match: Robert Hawkins (England)

Team details
England		Position	Spain
Name	Number	Position	Number	Name
Tom Halliwell (c)	7	Starter	1	Joel Lacombe (c)
Lewis King	5	Starter	2	Raphael Monedero
Wayne Boardman	10	Starter	3	Yannick Martin
Jack Brown	6	Starter	7	Theo Gonzalez
James Simpson	11	Starter	5	David Berty
Nathan Collins	1	Interchange	10	Pascal Ambrosino
Joe Coyd	3	Interchange	5	Jonathan Palomo
Robert Hawkins	2	Interchange	9	Eric Perez
Adam Rigby	8	Interchange	4	David Raymond
Declan Roberts	9	Interchange	8	Wilfrid Seron
Tom Coyd		Coach		Jean-Marc Gonzalez

6 November 2022
14:30 GMT (UTC±00:00)

Australia	76–18	Ireland
Tries: Karim (2) 6', 74'; Tannock 9'; McKenna (3) 15', 37', 69'; Grove (3) 28', 35', 37'; Arbuckle 38'; Hill 45'; Luff (2) 59', 62'; Goals: McKenna (10/10); Karim (2/3)	Report	Tries: Roberts 20'; McCarthy (2) 22', 65'; Goals: Johnston (3/3)

Copper Box Arena, London
Attendance: 3,268
Referees: Matthew Ball (England), Grant Jackson (Wales)
Touch judges: Laurent Abrial (France), David Roig (France)
Player of the Match: Bayley McKenna (Australia)

Team details
Australia		Position	Ireland
Name	Number	Position	Number	Name
Bayley McKenna	11	Starter	1	Toby Burton-Carter
Diab Karim	12	Starter	8	Peter Johnston
Brad Grove (c)	6	Starter	2	Tom Martin
Adam Tannock	9	Starter	9	Phil Roberts
Peter Arbuckle	1	Starter	5	James McCarthy
Craig Cannane	10	Interchange	11	Oran Spain
Shaun Harre	3	Interchange	5	Paddy Forbes
James Hill	4	Interchange	7	Scott Robertson
Zac Schumacher	8	Interchange	6	Kenneth Maloney
Liam Luff	2	Interchange	3	Rick Rodgers
Brett Clark		Coach		Damian McCabe

9 November 2022
11:00 GMT (UTC±00:00)

Australia	52–32	Spain
Tries: Arbuckle 3'; Karim (2) 9', 15'; Hill (4) 28', 32', 34', 48'; Cory Cannane 62'; Grove 72'; Goals: McKenna (3/4); Karim (3/6); Craig Cannane (2/2)	Report	Tries: Gonzalez (2) 12', 44'; Monedero (2) 22', 76'; Lacombe 50'; Martin 53'; Goals: Gonzalez (3/5); Seron (1/1)

Copper Box Arena, London
Attendance: 3,847
Referees: David Butler (England), David Roig (France)
Touch judges: Grant Jackson (Wales), Steve Hewson (Australia)
Player of the Match: James Hill (Australia)

Team details
Australia		Position	Spain
Name	Number	Position	Number	Name
Bayley McKenna	11	Starter	11	David Berty
Diab Karim	12	Starter	7	Theo Gonzalez
Brad Grove (c)	6	Starter	1	Joel Lacombe
Adam Tannock	9	Starter	3	Yannick Martin
Peter Arbuckle	1	Starter	5	Raphael Monedero
Craig Cannane	10	Interchange	4	David Raymond
Cory Cannane	5	Interchange	5	Jonathan Palomo
James Hill	4	Interchange	8	Wilfrid Seron
Zac Schumacher	8	Interchange	9	Eric Perez
Liam Luff	2	Interchange	10	Pascal Ambrosino
Brett Clark		Coach		Jean-Marc Gonzalez

9 November 2022
13:30 GMT (UTC±00:00)

England	121–0	Ireland
Tries: Bechara (2) 3', 15'; Coyd (4) 6', 17', 28', 78'; Halliwell (2) 9', 24'; Simpson (4) 12', 20', 75', 80'; Brown (3) 32', 38', 46'; Collins (3) 35', 54', 59'; King 62'; Rigby (2) 65', 71'	Report

Copper Box Arena, London
Attendance: 3,847
Referees: Oliver Cruickshank (Scotland), Grant Jackson (Wales)
Touch judges: David Roig (France), Steve Hewson (Australia)
Player of the Match: Joe Coyd (England)

Team details
England		Position	Ireland
Name	Number	Position	Number	Name
Tom Halliwell (c)	7	Starter	1	Toby Burton-Carter
Joe Coyd	3	Starter	8	Peter Johnston
Seb Bachara	4	Starter	2	Tom Martin
James Simpson	11	Starter	9	Phil Roberts
Lewis King	5	Starter	5	James McCarthy
Wayne Boardman	10	Interchange	11	Oran Spain
Nathan Collins	1	Interchange	5	Paddy Forbes
Adam Rigby	8	Interchange	7	Scott Robertson
Declan Roberts	9	Interchange	3	Rick Rodgers
Jack Brown	6	Interchange	4	Stephen Campbell
Tom Coyd		Coach		Damian McCabe

=== Group B ===
All six matches in group B were played at English Institute of Sport in Sheffield.

Pos	Team	Pld	W	D	L	PF	PA	PD	Pts	Qualification
1	France	3	3	0	0	350	27	+323	6	Advance to knockout stage
2	Wales	3	2	0	1	126	222	−96	4	Advance to knockout stage
3	United States	3	1	0	2	100	207	−107	2	
4	Scotland	3	0	0	3	92	212	−120	0	

Source: rlwc2021

4 November 2022
11:00 GMT (UTC±00:00)

France	154–6	Wales
Tries: Alazard (6) 1', 3', 14', 21', 25', 51'; Clausells (2) 5', 53'; Guttadoro (2) 16', 74'; Bourson (5) 10', 18', 23', 33', 45'; Penella (3) 19', 37', 48'; Abassi (5) 35', 42', 55', 69', 78'; Vargas (2) 38', 71'; Hivernat 40', 67'; Goals: Alazard (13); Guttadoro (4); Penella (6)	Report	Tries: Jones 27'; Goals: Halsey

English Institute of Sport, Sheffield
Attendance: 1,129
Referees: David Butler (England), Matthew Ball (England)
Touch judges: Grant Jackson (Wales), Steven Hewson (Australia)
Player of the Match: Lionel Alazard (France)

Team details
France		Position	Wales
Name	Number	Position	Number	Name
Lionel Alazard	1	Starter	1	Stephen Halsey
Gilles Clausells (c)	2	Starter	2	Scott Trigg-Turner
Mostefa Abassi	3	Starter	3	Gary Preece
Jeremy Bourson	4	Starter	5	Jodie Boyd-Ward
Julien Penella	6	Starter	5	Stuart Williams (c)
Florian Guttadoro	10	Interchange	8	Lucie Roberts
Guillaume Mautz	12	Interchange	9	Martin Lane
Arno Vargas	7	Interchange	11	Harry Jones
Jonathan Hivernat	11	Interchange	6	Andrew Higgins
		Interchange	10	Mark Williams
Sylvain Crismanovich		Coach		Stephen Jones

4 November 2022
13:30 GMT (UTC±00:00)

Scotland	41–62	United States
Tries: Young (4) 6', 13', 17', 67'; Grant (2) 22', 51'; Blackmore 25'; Willans 43'; Goals: Willans (4)	Report (RLWC); Report (ERL)	Tries: Johnson (4) 1', 3', 28', 46'; Wooloff (2) 20', 31'; Lind (2) 34', 40'; Townsend (4) 48', 56', 66', 70'; Goals: Johnstone (5); Stewart; Townsend

English Institute of Sport, Sheffield
Attendance: 1,129
Referees: Grant Jackson (Wales), Steven Hewson (Australia)
Touch judges: Matthew Ball (England), Ollie Cruickshank (Scotland)
Player of the Match: Mackenzie Johnson (United States)

Team details
Scotland		Position	USA
Name	Number	Position	Number	Name
Connor Blackmore	9	Starter	5	Mackenzie Johnson
Dan Grant	6	Starter	10	William Johnstone
Mike Mellon	7	Starter	7	Micah Stewart
John Willans	11	Starter	1	Jeffrey Townsend (c)
Callum Young	1	Starter	5	Matthew Wooloff
Gregor Anderson	4	Interchange	2	Jesse Lind
Paul Hartley	8	Interchange	11	Andy Kingsley
Peter Lauder	12	Interchange	3	Jensen Blaine
Greame Stewart	5	Interchange	4	Freddie Smith
Caydn Thomson	2	Interchange	8	Jabrier Lee
Mark Roughsedge		Coach		Geoff Mason

7 November 2022
17:00 GMT (UTC±00:00)

France	80–15	Scotland
Tries: N Clausells (4) 1', 6', 31', 40'; Mautz (2) 16', 44'; Verdi (2) 19', 55'; Vargas (2) 22', 67'; Gattadoro 29'; Abassi (2) 26', 59'; Penella 53'; Goals: N Clausells (7/9); Duhalde (5/5)	Report	Tries: Young 13'; Mellon 63'; Grant 75'; Goals: Grant (1/2)

English Institute of Sport, Sheffield
Attendance: 1,200
Referees: Steven Hewson (Australia), Ollie Cruickshank (Scotland)
Touch judges: Grant Jackson (Wales), David Butler (England)
Player of the Match: Arno Vargas (France)

Team details
France		Position	Scotland
Name	Number	Position	Number	Name
Nicolas Clausells	8	Starter	1	Callum Young
Florian Gattadoro	10	Starter	7	Michael Mellon
Guillaume Mautz (c)	12	Starter	6	Dan Grant
Arno Vargas	7	Starter	11	John Willans
Yann Verdi	9	Starter	5	Connor Blackmore
Mostefa Abassi	3	Interchange	3	Dave Anderson
Jeremy Bourson	4	Interchange	4	Gregor Anderson
Gilles Clausells	2	Interchange	10	David Birtles
Thomas Duhalde	5	Interchange	12	Pete Lauder
Julien Penella	6	Interchange	2	Cadyn Thomson
Sylvain Crismanovich		Coach		Mark Roughsedge

7 November 2022
19:30 GMT (UTC±00:00)

Wales	50–32	United States
Tries: Preece (2) 13', 59'; S. Williams (3) 25', 29', 39'; Halsey 31'; Jones 46'; Higgins 61'; Trigg-Turner 67'; Goals: Halsey (5/6); Higgins (2/3)	Report	Tries: Townsend (4) 8', 19', 54', 72'; Johnson 11'; Wooloff 36'; Goals: Johnstone (3/4); Stewart (1/2)

English Institute of Sport, Sheffield
Attendance: 1,200
Referees: David Roig (France), David Butler (England)
Touch judges: Matthew Ball (England), Steven Hewson (Australia)
Player of the Match: Stuart Williams (Wales)

Team details
Wales		Position	USA
Name	Number	Position	Number	Name
Stephen Halsey	1	Starter	5	Mackenzie Johnson
Gary Preece	3	Starter	1	Jeffrey Townsend (c)
Jodie Boyd-Ward	5	Starter	7	Micah Stewart
Stuart Williams	2	Starter	10	William Johnstone
Martin Lane	9	Starter	5	Matthew Wooloff
Alan Caron	12	Interchange	12	Tony Leboutillier
Harry Jones	11	Interchange	2	Jesse Lind
Andrew Higgins	6	Interchange	11	Andy Kingsley
Mark Williams	10	Interchange	9	Gabi Cha
Scott Trigg-Turner	2	Interchange	3	Jensen Blaine
Stephen Jones		Coach		Geoff Mason

10 November 2022
11:00 GMT (UTC±00:00)

France	116–6	United States
Tries: Bourson (5) 1', 7', 9', 17', 38'; Hivernat (3) 11', 20', 23'; Abassi (5) 13', 18', 63', 75', 78'; Duhalde (2) 34', 60'; G Clausells (3) 41', 45', 51'; Mautz 55'; N Clausells 58'; Alazard 65'; Goals: Alazard (9/11); G Clausells (3/4); Duhalde (4/6)	Report	Tries: Johnson 72'; Goals: Stewart (1/1)

English Institute of Sport, Sheffield
Attendance: 1,129
Referees: Matthew Ball (England), Kim Abel (Wales)
Touch judges: David Butler (England), David Roig (France)

Team details
France		Position	USA
Name	Number	Position	Number	Name
Lionel Alazard	1	Starter	1	Jeffrey Townsend
Jonathan Hivernat	11	Starter	5	Mackenzie Johnson
Mostefa Abassi	3	Starter	6	Matthew Wooloff
Jeremy Bourson	4	Starter	7	Micah Stewart
Nicolas Clausells	8	Starter	5	William Johnstone
Julien Penella	6	Interchange	3	Jensen Blaine
Arno Vargas	7	Interchange	9	Gabi Cha
Thomas Duhalde	5	Interchange	11	Andy Kingsley
Gilles Clausells	2	Interchange	8	Jabrier Lee
Guillaume Mautz	12	Interchange	2	Jesse Lind
Sylvain Crismanovich		Coach		Geoff Mason

10 November 2022
13:30 GMT (UTC±00:00)

Wales	70–36	Scotland
Tries: Trigg-Turner (3) 2', 12', 53'; Preece 5'; Higgins (4) 16', 46', 48', 74'; Lane (2) 34', 78'; Jones (2) 36', 42'; Goals: Higgins (9/11); M. Williams (2/2)	Report	Tries: Grant (4) 8', 38', 70', 80'; Willans 22'; Mellon (2) 26', 57'; Goals: Willans (1/3); Dan Grant (3/4)

English Institute of Sport, Sheffield
Attendance: 1,129
Referees: Laurent Abrial (France), Steve Hewson (Australia)
Touch judges: Kim Abel (Wales), Grant Jackson (Wales)
Player of the Match: Andrew Higgins (Wales)

Team details
Wales		Position	Scotland
Name	Number	Position	Number	Name
Scott Trigg-Turner	2	Starter	9	Connor Blackmore
Gary Preece	3	Starter	6	Dan Grant
Jodie Boyd-Ward	5	Starter	7	Michael Mellon
Andrew Higgins	6	Starter	11	John Willans
Stuart Williams	7	Starter	5	Callum Young
Martin Lane	9	Interchange	3	Dave Anderson
Harry Jones	11	Interchange	10	David Birtles
Lucie Roberts	8	Interchange	8	Paul Hartley
Mark Williams	10	Interchange	12	Pete Lauder
Alan Caron	12	Interchange	2	Cadyn Thomson
Stephen Jones		Coach		Mark Roughsedge

== Knockout stage ==
Semi-finals
13 November – Sheffield
France	84
Australia	40
13 November – Sheffield
England	125
Wales	22

Final
18 November – Manchester
France	24
England	28

=== Semi-finals ===
Both semi-finals were played at English Institute of Sport in Sheffield.

13 November 2022
12:00 GMT (UTC±00:00)

France	84–40	Australia
Tries: Guttadoro (3) 1', 5', 60'; Bourson (5) 6', 8', 17', 21', 26'; N Clausells (2) 28', 78'; Abassi (4) 31', 35', 39', 52'; Duhalde 75'; Goals: Alazard (7/8); G Clausells (5/7)	Report	Tries: Grove (2) 3', 69'; Schumacher 13', 58'; Karim 41'; Luff 62'; Craig Cannane 73'; Goals: McKenna (4/5); Karim (2/2)

English Institute of Sport, Sheffield
Attendance: 1,318
Referees: Ollie Cruickshank (Scotland), David Butler (England)
Touch judges: Kim Abel (Wales), Grant Jackson (Wales)
Player of the Match: Jeremy Bourson (France)

Team details
France		Position	Australia
Name	Number	Position	Number	Name
Lionel Alazard	1	Starter	1	Peter Arbuckle
Mostefa Abassi	3	Starter	6	Brad Grove (c)
Jeremy Bourson	4	Starter	12	Diab Karim
Florian Guttadoro	10	Starter	8	Zac Schumacher
Nicolas Clausells	8	Starter	5	Bayley McKenna
Gilles Clausells (c)	2	Interchange	5	Cory Cannane
Julien Penella	6	Interchange	10	Craig Cannane
Guillaume Mautz	12	Interchange	4	James Hill
Arno Vargas	7	Interchange	2	Liam Luff
Thomas Duhalde	5	Interchange	3	Shaun Harre
Sylvain Crismanovich		Coach		Brett Clark

13 November 2022
14:30 GMT (UTC±00:00)

England	125–22	Wales
Tries: Bechara (4) 2', 4', 7', 32'; Coyd (4) 11', 20', 23', 43'; Brown (8) 26', 30', 34', 36', 41', 50', 57', 59'; Hawkins (2) 28', 77'; King 46'; Collins 53'; Roberts 68'; Simpson 75'; Goals: Hawkins (7/8); Collins (10/11); Roberts (1/3); Drop goals: Roberts	Report	Tries: Trigg-Turner 17'; Preece 49'; S. Williams 55'; Caron 65'; Goals: Preece (1/2); Higgins (2/2)

English Institute of Sport, Sheffield
Attendance: 1,318
Referees: Laurent Abriel (France), Matthew Ball (England)
Touch judges: David Roig (France), Steven Hewson (Australia)
Player of the Match: Jack Brown (England)

Team details
England		Position	Wales
Name	Number	Position	Number	Name
Rob Hawkins	2	Starter	6	Andrew Higgins
Joe Coyd	3	Starter	9	Martin Lane
Seb Bechara	4	Starter	3	Gary Preece (yellow card) 75' to 80'
Lewis King	5	Starter	2	Scott Trigg-Turner
Tom Halliwell (c)	7	Starter	5	Stuart Williams (c)
Nathan Collins	1	Interchange	11	Harry Jones
Jack Brown	6	Interchange	8	Lucie Roberts
Declan Roberts	9	Interchange	12	Alan Caron
Wayne Boardman	10	Interchange	6	Jodie Boyd-Ward
James Simpson	11	Interchange	1	Stephen Halsey
Tom Coyd		Coach		Stephen Jones

=== Final ===
The final was played at Manchester Central Convention Complex in Manchester, the day before the men's and women's finals.

18 November 2022
19:30 GMT (UTC±00:00)

France	24–28	England
Tries: Alazard 10'; Abassi 29'; G Clausells 57'; Goals: Alazard (1/1); N Clausells (5/6)	Report	Tries: Halliwell (2) 19', 78'; Brown (2) 39', 53'; King 42'; Goals: Hawkins (1/1); Collins (3/5)

Manchester Central, Manchester
Attendance: 4,526
Referees: Ollie Cruickshank (Scotland), Laurent Abrial (France)
Touch judges: David Butler (England), David Roig (France)
Player of the Match: Tom Halliwell (England)

Team details
France		Position	England
Name	Number	Position	Number	Name
Mostefa Abassi	3	Starter	7	Tom Halliwell (c)
Lionel Alazard	1	Starter	2	Rob Hawkins
Jérémy Bourson	4	Starter	3	Joe Coyd
Julien Pennella	6	Starter	4	Seb Bechara
Nicolas Clausells	8	Starter	5	Lewis King
Florian Guttadoro	10	Interchange	1	Nathan Collins
Jonathan Hivernat	11	Interchange	6	Jack Brown
Guillaume Mautz	12	Interchange	9	Declan Roberts
Gilles Clausells (c)	2	Interchange	10	Wayne Boardman
Arno Vargas	7	Interchange	11	James Simpson
Sylvain Crismanovich		Coach		Tom Coyd

== Team of the Tournament ==
Between the Semi-finals and final the RLWC2021 organisers announced the Wheelchair Team of the Tournament:

1. Lionel Alazard – France
2. Seb Bechara – England
3. Jérémy Bourson – France
4. Jack Brown – England
5. Nicolas Clausells – France
6. Joe Coyd – England
7. Theo Gonzalez – Spain
8. McKenzie Johnson – United States
9. Bayley McKenna – Australia
10. Stuart Williams – Wales

== See also ==
- 2021 Men's Rugby League World Cup
- 2021 Women's Rugby League World Cup
- Legacy of the 2021 Rugby League World Cup
