= 2021 Rugby League World Cup =

International rugby league tournaments

- Number of teams: 16 (men); 8 (women); 8 (wheelchair)
- Host country: England
- Winner: Australia (men); Australia (women); England (wheelchair)
- Matches played: 61
- Attendance: 473,477 (7,762 per match)

The 2021 Rugby League World Cup (RLWC2021) was a collection of world cups in the sport of rugby league, held in England from 15 October to 19 November 2022.

England won hosting rights for the competition on 27 October 2016. The bid received £25 million UK government support, partnered with the UK Cabinet Office as part of a commitment to the Northern Powerhouse, with 87 percent of all matches to be held in northern towns and cities. Organisers initially planned for the tournaments to go ahead between 23 October and 27 November 2021 despite the COVID-19 pandemic but withdrawals from Australia and New Zealand over "player welfare and safety concerns" caused the tournaments to be postponed – with the event's chief executive admitting that a World Cup without those teams would have lacked credibility.

For the first time, the men's, women's, and wheelchair tournaments were held concurrently as centrepiece events with all participants being paid the same. 32 teams (16 men, 8 women, and 8 wheelchair) from 20 nations competed across 61 matches. Australia men beat Samoa 30–10 to win a record-extending 12th title, Australia women beat New Zealand 54–4 to win a record-equalling third title, and England wheelchair team beat France 28–24 to win a record-equalling second title. Additional competitions under the Festival of World Cups banner were also planned to take place but were cancelled due to fundraising and squad selection issues caused by the COVID-19 pandemic. Despite its cancellation, an inaugural Physical Disability Rugby League World Cup (PDRL) and a Masters Rugby League event were rescheduled to take place alongside the main competitions. England beat New Zealand 42–10 in the final to become the inaugural PDRL World Cup champions.

All 61 matches in the men's, women's, and wheelchair competitions were broadcast live, with the opening and closing matchdays of the physical disability competition also receiving UK coverage via BBC Sport. Along with official sponsors and partners, organisers announced numerous projects to focus on the long-term impact of the Rugby League World Cup. Named "InspirationALL", this included a £10 million fund from the Department for Digital, Culture, Media and Sport to enable sports clubs to develop their facilities.

== Host selection ==
There were initially three bids for the 2021 Rugby League World Cup, but the United Arab Emirates' bid was cancelled due to the arrest of Sol Mokdad at the behest of UAE rugby union officials.

England, and the United States and Canada were the two remaining bidders of the event. The English RFL received UK government support – £15 million to enhance the tournament and up to a further £10 million into the game's infrastructure – for the event to be staged in the country. The RFL mentioned they wanted the event to be the most attended in history with over 1,000,000 people attending the grounds over the tournament's days. They were also planning to use 12 venues for the event which included non-purpose and rugby league-purpose stadiums.

The United States and Canada bid was initially a sole United States bid from an Australian sports–marketing agency, Moore Sports International (MSI). Eight to ten cities, featuring a mix of National Football League and soccer-specific stadiums, were planned for the event, offering the Rugby League International Federation (RLIF) the opportunity to stage the tournament outside of Europe and Australasia for the first time. Canada Rugby League later announced they wanted to be a part of the United States bid stating that the cities of Vancouver and Toronto could also potentially host matches.

On 27 October 2016, the RLIF announced that England had won hosting rights for the 2021 Rugby League World Cup.

== Nations ==
A total of 20 Nations are involved across the three major tournaments: (Note: Norway were due to compete in the wheelchair competition but were replaced by Ireland after being made unable due to COVID-19 pandemic related issues. The 32 teams across the three tournaments would have been made up from 21 different nations.)

- Australia (M, W, WC)
- Brazil (W)
- Canada (W)
- Cook Islands (M, W)
- England (M, W, WC)
- Fiji (M)
- France (M, W, WC)
- Greece (M)
- Ireland (M, WC)
- Italy (M)
- Jamaica (M)
- Lebanon (M)
- New Zealand (M, W)
- Papua New Guinea (M, W)
- Samoa (M)
- Scotland (M, WC)
- Spain (WC)
- Tonga (M)
- United States (WC)
- Wales (M, WC)

Note: M=Men's tournament, W=Women's tournament, WC=Wheelchair tournament

== Venues ==
The full list of 21 venues to be used for the three tournaments (men's, women's and wheelchair) was announced on 29 January 2019. Seventeen venues were used for the men's tournament and in addition Preston and York were announced as a training venue for the tournaments. Four of those same venues (DW Stadium, Headingley Stadium, MKM Stadium, and Old Trafford) as well as the York Community Stadium were used for the women's tournament. Three further venues (Copper Box Arena, English Institute of Sport, and Manchester Central) will host the Wheelchair tournament. Base camps were used by the 32 national squads to stay and train before and during the World Cup tournament. On 10 June 2020, these locations were released. All three tournaments held their final in Manchester, with the Wheelchair tournament concluding on 18 November, and the women's and the men's finals taking place in a double-header the day after at Old Trafford.

The M62's route in relation to the four major cities it serves: Liverpool, Manchester, Leeds and Hull.

Organisers partnered with the UK Cabinet Office as part of a commitment to the Northern Powerhouse. The UK's Ministry for Housing, Communities and Local Government and the Northern Powerhouse minister welcomed the news that 87 percent of matches (including all three finals) would be held in the North, exceeding a previous 80 percent commitment from organisers in receipt of £25 million government funding. This attracted some criticism from Rugby League expansionists unhappy about the lack of games throughout the country outside of the traditional M62 Corridor.

The use of the as-yet unbuilt Workington Community Stadium was initially a venue for three group matches in the men's tournament but was later cancelled. The venue was first thrown into doubt after the 2019 Allerdale Borough Council election when control of the council changed and the new council showed less enthusiasm for the new stadium project. In early July 2019, Allerdale Council confirmed that they would be unable to host any matches in the tournament. On 28 August 2019, it was announced that Kingston Park in Newcastle upon Tyne would host the three games originally allocated to Workington. Anfield in Liverpool were also due to host matches in both the men's and women's tournaments but became unavailable when the competition was moved from 2021 to 2022. It was replaced by the DW Stadium in Wigan.

The BBC's official trailer for the tournaments depicted landmarks from some of the host towns and cities. In chronological order these were; the Tyne Bridge (Newcastle), Sports Village (Leigh), Tower Bridge and its surroundings (London), the Corn Exchange (Leeds), the M62 motorway (in reference to the M62 Corridor), and Beetham Tower and its surroundings (Manchester).

=== Stadium locations ===
Stadiums are referred to by their official name rather than sponsored name, as is International Rugby League policy.

Manchester (Old Trafford)	London (Holloway)	Newcastle (city centre)	Leeds (Beeston)	Middlesbrough
Old Trafford	Emirates Stadium	St James' Park	Elland Road	Riverside Stadium
Capacity: 74,994	Capacity: 60,260	Capacity: 52,405	Capacity: 37,890	Capacity: 34,742
Coventry	Stadiums in Greater Manchester Stadiums in West Yorkshire Stadiums in South Yorkshire			Sheffield (Highfield)
Coventry Building Society Arena	Stadiums in Greater Manchester Stadiums in West Yorkshire Stadiums in South Yorkshire			Bramall Lane
Capacity: 32,753	Stadiums in Greater Manchester Stadiums in West Yorkshire Stadiums in South Yorkshire			Capacity: 32,702
Bolton	Stadiums in Greater Manchester Stadiums in West Yorkshire Stadiums in South Yorkshire			Hull
University of Bolton Stadium	Stadiums in Greater Manchester Stadiums in West Yorkshire Stadiums in South Yorkshire			MKM Stadium
Capacity: 28,723	Stadiums in Greater Manchester Stadiums in West Yorkshire Stadiums in South Yorkshire			Capacity: 25,400
Wigan	Stadiums in Greater Manchester Stadiums in West Yorkshire Stadiums in South Yorkshire			Huddersfield
DW Stadium	Stadiums in Greater Manchester Stadiums in West Yorkshire Stadiums in South Yorkshire			Kirklees Stadium
Capacity: 25,138	Stadiums in Greater Manchester Stadiums in West Yorkshire Stadiums in South Yorkshire			Capacity: 24,121
Leeds (Headingley)	Stadiums in Greater Manchester Stadiums in West Yorkshire Stadiums in South Yorkshire			St Helens
Headingley Rugby Stadium	Stadiums in Greater Manchester Stadiums in West Yorkshire Stadiums in South Yorkshire			Totally Wicked Stadium
Capacity: 21,062	Stadiums in Greater Manchester Stadiums in West Yorkshire Stadiums in South Yorkshire			Capacity: 18,000
Doncaster	Warrington	Leigh	Newcastle (Kingston Park)	York
Eco-Power Stadium	Halliwell Jones Stadium	Leigh Sports Village	Kingston Park	York Community Stadium
Capacity: 15,231	Capacity: 15,200	Capacity: 12,000	Capacity: 10,200	Capacity: 8,500
Manchester (city centre)		London (Olympic Park)	Sheffield (Lower Don Valley)	
Manchester Central		Copper Box Arena	English Institute of Sport	
Capacity: 10,900		Capacity: 7,481	Capacity: Changeable	

=== Team base camp locations ===
14 base camps were used by the 32 national teams to stay and train before and during the World Cup tournament, as follows:

- Bolton – France (Men's)
- Doncaster – Samoa (Men's)
- Hull – Fiji (Men's)
- Leeds – Jamaica, Ireland (Men's) | England, Papua New Guinea, Brazil, Canada (Women's)
- London – England, Australia, Ireland, Spain (Wheelchair)
- St Helens – Tonga, Italy (Men's)
- Manchester – England, Australia (Men's)
- Newcastle – Scotland (Men's)
- Preston – Wales (Men's)
- Sheffield – Greece (Men's) | France, Wales, Scotland, USA (Wheelchair)
- Tees Valley – Cook Islands (Men's)
- Warrington – Papua New Guinea (Men's)
- Wigan – Lebanon (Men's)
- York – New Zealand (Men's) | Australia, New Zealand, France, Cook Islands (Women's)

== Postponement due to the COVID-19 Pandemic ==
The World Cups were originally due to be held between 23 October 2021 and 27 November 2021, but the COVID-19 pandemic and the subsequent withdrawals of Australia and New Zealand caused the tournament to be postponed.

Despite the initial date for World Cup being over a year and a half away when COVID-19 was declared a pandemic, from very early on organisers developed contingency plans to defer the events to 2022 should it become necessary to postpone in 2021. Having originally given themselves a cut off date of May 2021, organisers finally announced in July their decision to go ahead with the planned scheduling for 2021. This was despite reports that the Australian Rugby League Commission had yet to sign the participation agreement and the South Sydney Rabbitohs CEO Blake Solly claiming the preferred option from NRL clubs remained to postpone it to 2022. On a BBC rugby league poscast, RLWC2021 chief executive Jon Dutton that the option to postpone was discussed but was ""significantly unpalatable" with the potential of clashing with the men's football World Cup, the women's football European Championships and the Commonwealth Games in 2022. Dutton also suggested that there would be "a number of nations who would step up if any nation didn't take part for any reason across all three tournaments". Just one week later, Australia and New Zealand officially declared their withdrawal from the competitions citing "player welfare and safety concerns".

In the one week between tournament organisers announcing the tournament would go ahead in 2021 and the announcement that Australia and New Zealand would withdraw, the United Kingdom had repealed its last remaining social contact restrictions on so called "Freedom Day" despite skyrocketing COVID-19 cases. In contrast, during that same period, half of Australia's population were placed back under lockdown and 14 NRL clubs were relocated to Queensland in order for the remainder of 2021 NRL season to be completed.

Australia and New Zealand faced backlash following their announcement to withdraw with RFL chairman Simon Johnson calling the decision "selfish, parochial and cowardly". The Guardian had previously claimed that NRL clubs were not keen on the World Cup's current scheduling because players may not return until two weeks before the start of trial games for the 2022 NRL season (and border rules dictated anyone returning to the country must spend 14 days in government-managed quarantine). Johnson also suggested that the decision had been made at boardroom-level and without the consultation of players whilst The Guardian further claimed that a survey showed 75% of players consulted by Australia's players union remained happy to travel to England. Johnson had also pointed out the difference compared to other Australian sporting bodies that were still planning to send athletes to the Tokyo Olympics from July 2021. However, former Downing Street Press Secretary and British journalist Alastair Campbell noted the differences between the lower cases and tougher restrictions in Japan compared to the higher cases and no restrictions that existed in the UK – instead blaming Simon Johnson's namesake and then-British PM Boris Johnson for wrecking the World Cup.

On 5 August 2021 tournament organisers announced they would postpone the World Cups to 2022 with just little more than a month away from its start with Dutton admitting that a World Cup without Australia and New Zealand would have lacked credibility.

== Opening ceremony ==
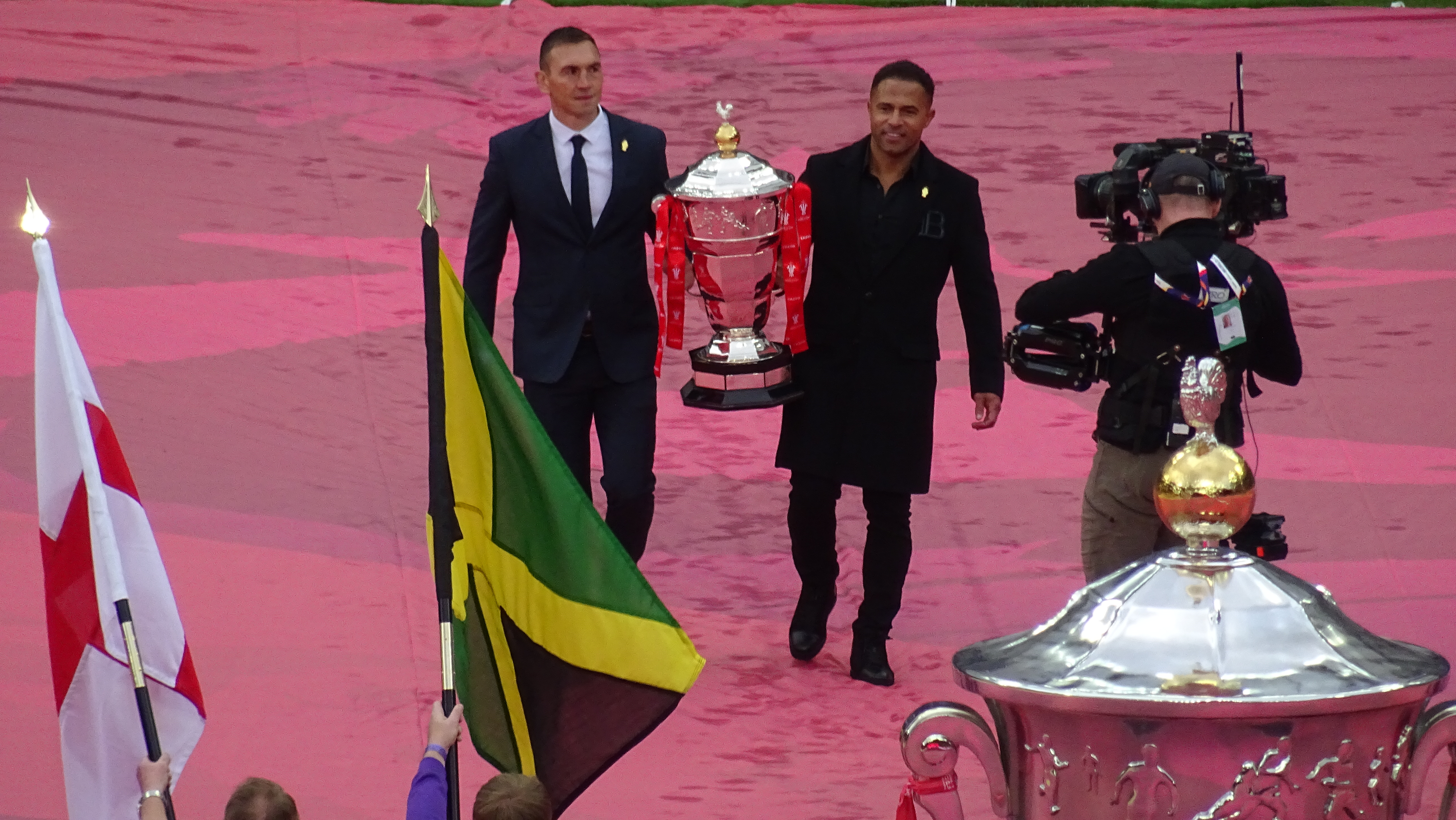
Men's World Cup trophy being brought out at the opening ceremony by Kevin Sinfield and Jason Robinson

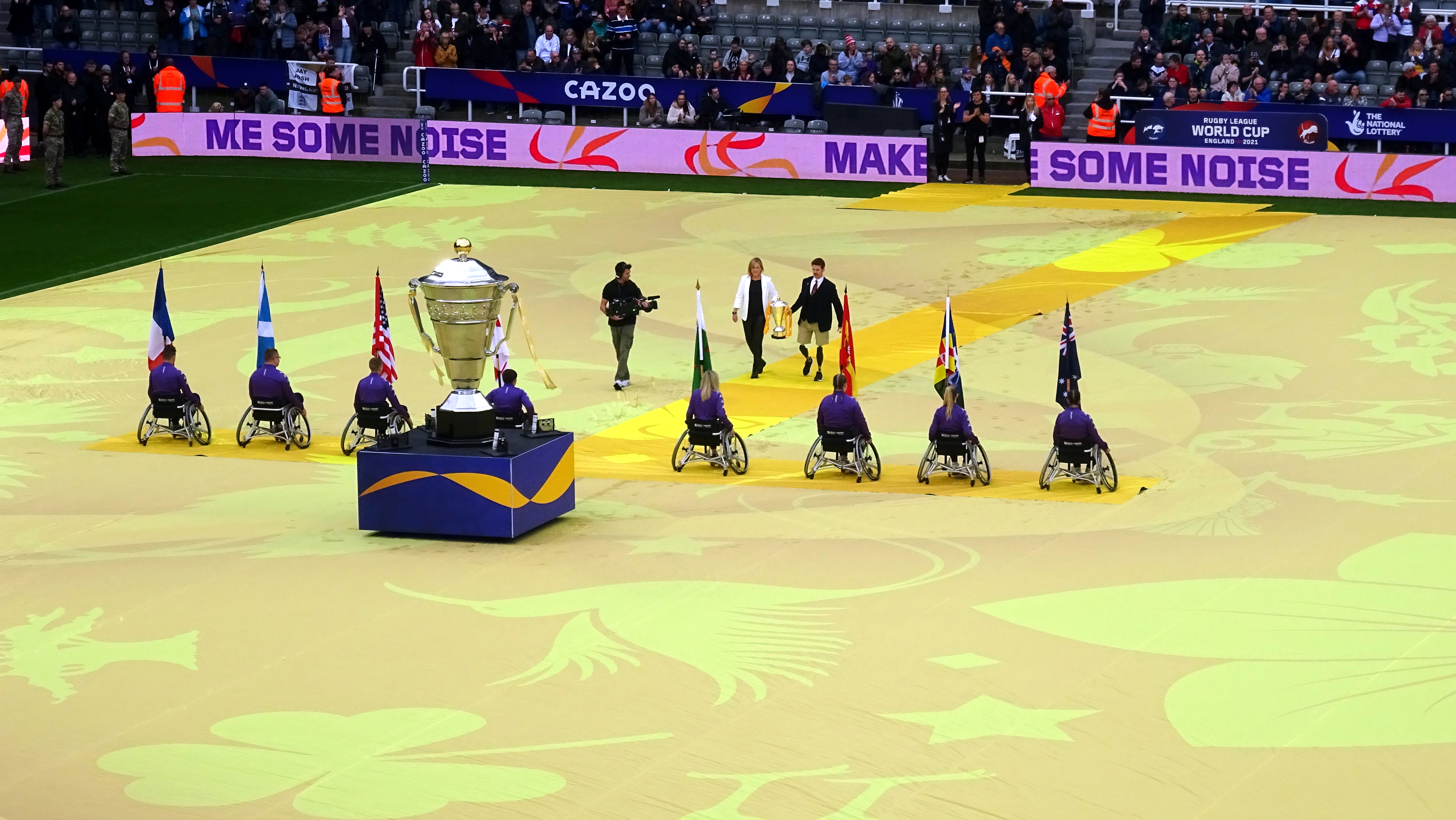
The Wheelchair trophy being brought out at the opening ceremony

The opening ceremony for all three tournaments took place at St James' Park in Newcastle on 15 October 2022 before the men's Group A match between England and Samoa. On 5 October 2022, the Kaiser Chiefs were announced as the headline act for the opening ceremony.

The opening ceremony suffered major disruption as the PA system at St. James's Park failed resulting in most of it being curtailed. Kaiser Chiefs only managed to play one song and only the flag bearers of participating nations were called to the field before the failure. The trophies of the three tournaments were brought out without announcement from the PA. It was planned that local school children would also perform a display, however this was cut due to the curtailment. Kaiser Chiefs's lead singer Ricky Wilson entertained the crowd during the technical difficulties.

The PA failure also resulted in a ten-minute delay to kick-off as the system was needed in order to play The Banner of Freedom and God Save The King before the match.

== Competitions ==
For the first time, the men's, women's, and wheelchair tournaments were held concurrently as centrepiece events with all players receiving equal pay. The draw for all the World Cup tournaments were originally scheduled to be finalised on 27 November 2019, exactly two years before the original date of the tournament final, but it was postponed until 16 January 2020. The draw was made at Buckingham Palace on 16 January 2020. For each competition teams from pool 1 were drawn by Prince Harry, Duke of Sussex, pool 2 was drawn by Katherine Grainger and pool 3 by Jason Robinson. Teams in each group played one another in a round-robin, with the top two teams advancing to the knockout stage.

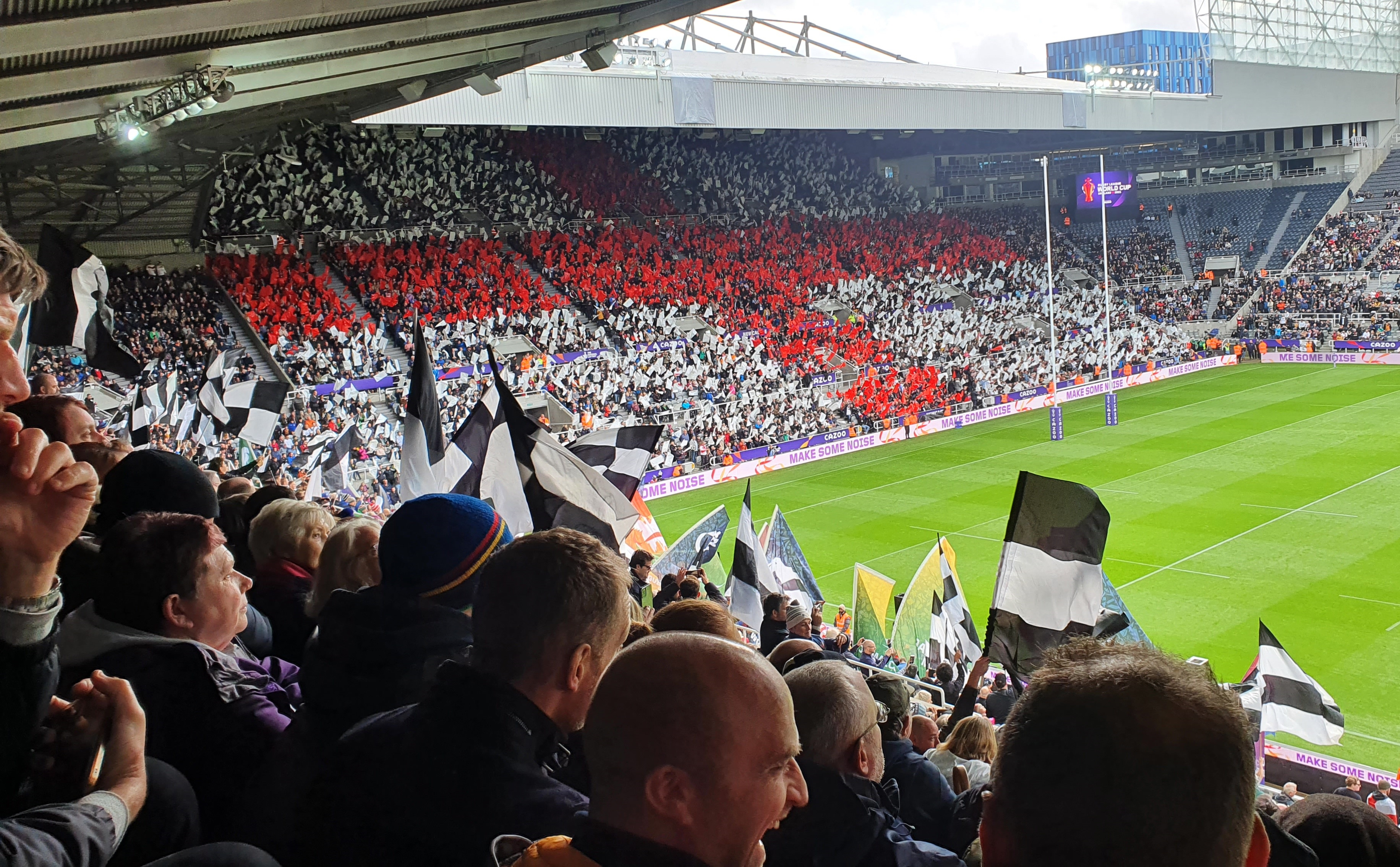
England rugby league fans create an England flag ahead of the launch of the World Cup at St James' Park

=== Men’s tournament ===
The 2021 Men's Rugby League World Cup was the sixteenth staging of Men's Rugby League World Cup. 16 teams competed in the tournament, an increase of two from the previous two tournaments and the first to feature 16 teams since the 2000 Rugby League World Cup. Australia are defending champions having won a record eleventh title last time out. Competing countries were divided into four groups of four teams (groups A to D).

Reigning champions Australia took on first-time finalists Samoa in the men's final. Australia beat New Zealand by two points in the semi-final to progress and went into the match having been crowned champion in 10 of the last 11 tournaments. Samoa beat the highly ranked host nation, England, with a golden point drop goal to become the first nation outside Australia, New Zealand or Great Britain/England to reach the final since 1968. Australia, who had reached every final since 1957, were considered overwhelming favourites against a Samoa team they had beaten in the 2017 quarter-finals, 46–0.

Australia won their 12th title in a 30–10 victory at Old Trafford. Samoa started the match well with early pressure but Australia's strong defensive performance laid the foundations and more than lived up to their billing as overwhelming favourites. Samoa were unlucky not to have been awarded a 40/20 kick, and despite a competitive start to the match, were hit by two tries in four minutes; Latrell Mitchell breaking the deadlock on 13 minutes before Josh Addo-Carr and Liam Martin extended Australia's lead to 14–0 at half-time. After the break, Angus Crichton was sin-binned for an elbow that ruled out Chanel Harris-Tavita for the remainder of the match with a head injury, but even with a man down Australia added a fourth try through Cameron Murray. Brian To’o scored a consolation for Samoa to make it 20–6, before Tedesco and Stephen Crichton exchanged tries prior to Mitchell rounding up the scoring with his second try in the final minute.

==== Group A ====
Pos	Team	Pld	W	D	L	PF	PA	PD	Pts	Qualification
1	England (H)	3	3	0	0	196	28	+168	6	Advance to knockout stage
2	Samoa	3	2	0	1	140	68	+72	4	Advance to knockout stage
3	France	3	1	0	2	56	116	−60	2	
4	Greece	3	0	0	3	20	200	−180	0	

Source: rlwc2021
(H) Hosts

==== Group B ====
Pos	Team	Pld	W	D	L	PF	PA	PD	Pts	Qualification
1	Australia	3	3	0	0	192	14	+178	6	Advance to knockout stage
2	Fiji	3	2	0	1	98	60	+38	4	Advance to knockout stage
3	Italy	3	1	0	2	38	130	−92	2	
4	Scotland	3	0	0	3	18	142	−124	0	

Source: rlwc2021

==== Group C ====
Pos	Team	Pld	W	D	L	PF	PA	PD	Pts	Qualification
1	New Zealand	3	3	0	0	150	28	+122	6	Advance to knockout stage
2	Lebanon	3	2	0	1	118	60	+58	4	Advance to knockout stage
3	Ireland	3	1	0	2	72	82	−10	2	
4	Jamaica	3	0	0	3	20	190	−170	0	

Source: rlwc2021

==== Group D ====
Pos	Team	Pld	W	D	L	PF	PA	PD	Pts	Qualification
1	Tonga	3	3	0	0	148	34	+114	6	Advance to knockout stage
2	Papua New Guinea	3	2	0	1	86	40	+46	4	Advance to knockout stage
3	Cook Islands	3	1	0	2	44	136	−92	2	
4	Wales	3	0	0	3	18	86	−68	0	

Source: rlwc2021

==== Knockout stage ====
Quarter-finals
5 November – Wigan
England	46
Papua New Guinea	6
6 November – Warrington
Tonga	18
Samoa	20
4 November – Huddersfield
Australia	48
Lebanon	4
5 November – Hull
New Zealand	24
Fiji	18

Semi-finals
12 November – London
England	26
Samoa (g.p.)	27
11 November – Leeds
Australia	16
New Zealand	14

Final
19 November – Manchester
Samoa	10
Australia	30

=== Women’s tournament ===
The 2021 tournament was the sixth staging of the Women's Rugby League World Cup and featured eight teams, an increase of two from the 2017 event. Australia were the defending champions having won their second title last time out. The teams were drawn into two groups of four. The two seeded teams were England (Group A) as hosts and Australia as holders (Group B).

Australia and New Zealand squared off in the women's final for the fourth consecutive time. New Zealand had previously won the tournament a record three times and had appeared in every final since the inaugural event in 2000. Australia went into the match with only two previous titles but had claimed both their wins in the two most recent tournaments in 2013 and 2017. Australia had been the most dominant side throughout the tournament, amassing 258 points in their five matches prior to the final – including an 82–0 victory against Papua New Guinea in the semi-final. In contrast, New Zealand beat hosts England in the semi-final 20–6 and had already lost to Australia in the group stages, 10–8. Australia won a record-equalling third title in a dominant 54–4 thrashing. Jessica Sergis opened the scoring within six minutes into the final, before two tries from Isabelle Kelly and another from Julia Robinson gave Australia a 20–0 lead at half-time. New Zealand could not muster a response in the second-half with Emma Tonegato, Tarryn Aiken, and Sergis all extending the lead for Australia, but a Madison Bartlett try did give the Kiwis a consolation. Kennedy Cherrington and Evania Pelite concluded the scoring for Australia as they ran out as 54–4 winners, the second-highest margin of victory recorded in a final.

==== Group A ====
Pos	Team	Pld	W	D	L	PF	PA	PD	Pts	Qualification
1	England	3	3	0	0	168	12	+156	6	Advance to knockout stage
2	Papua New Guinea	3	2	0	1	108	54	+54	4	Advance to knockout stage
3	Canada	3	1	0	2	38	104	−66	2	
4	Brazil	3	0	0	3	20	164	−144	0	

Source: BBC Sport

==== Group B ====
Pos	Team	Pld	W	D	L	PF	PA	PD	Pts	Qualification
1	Australia	3	3	0	0	176	8	+168	6	Advance to knockout stage
2	New Zealand	3	2	0	1	88	14	+74	4	Advance to knockout stage
3	Cook Islands	3	1	0	2	30	126	−96	2	
4	France	3	0	0	3	18	164	−146	0	

Source: BBC Sport

==== Knockout stage ====
Semi-finals
14 November – York
Australia	82
Papua New Guinea	0
14 November – York
England	6
New Zealand	20

Final
19 November – Manchester
Australia	54
New Zealand	4

=== Wheelchair tournament ===
Eight teams competed, an increase of one from 2017. They were drawn into two groups of four. France were defending champions, having won their second title in 2017. The two seeded teams were England (Group A) as hosts and France as holders (Group B).

France and England were considered to have "been the best at the tournament by a distance, going through the pool stages unbeaten and then both recording comprehensive semi-final wins" to ultimately face off against each other for a third consecutive world cup final. England overturned their "heartbreaking defeats" by four points in 2017 and two points in 2013 to claim their first world cup title since 2008. With the sides evenly matched, the game was not the free-scoring spectacle that earlier rounds had been and both teams produced strong defensive displays. The final did not see either team stretch a lead beyond eight points at any point during the match, with France taking an 8–0 lead early on and a narrow 14–12 scoreline into half-time. England went ahead for the first time three minutes into the second half through a try by Lewis King before Jack Brown extended their lead by eight points. 59-year-old Gilles Clausells hit back with a try whilst his nephew, Nicolas Clausells, added two goals to make it 22–22. England briefly went ahead through a penalty before Nico Clausells responded again to ensure a grandstand finish at 24–24 but later missed a further penalty to go ahead in the 75th minute. With the scores level, England captain Tom Halliwell dummied through for his second score of the match to win the game 28–24 in front of a world-record crowd of 4,526.

==== Group A ====
Pos	Team	Pld	W	D	L	PF	PA	PD	Pts	Qualification
1	England	3	3	0	0	263	20	+243	6	Advance to knockout stage
2	Australia	3	2	0	1	136	88	+48	4	Advance to knockout stage
3	Spain	3	1	0	2	99	188	−89	2	
4	Ireland	3	0	0	3	50	252	−202	0	

Source: rlwc2021

==== Group B ====
Pos	Team	Pld	W	D	L	PF	PA	PD	Pts	Qualification
1	France	3	3	0	0	350	27	+323	6	Advance to knockout stage
2	Wales	3	2	0	1	126	222	−96	4	Advance to knockout stage
3	United States	3	1	0	2	100	207	−107	2	
4	Scotland	3	0	0	3	92	212	−120	0	

Source: rlwc2021

==== Knockout stage ====
Semi-finals
13 November – Sheffield
France	84
Australia	40
13 November – Sheffield
England	125
Wales	22

Final
18 November – Manchester
France	24
England	28

=== Festival of World Cups ===
Additional competitions under the Festival of World Cups banner were planned to be held in Greater Manchester in the summer prior to the three centrepiece men's, women's and wheelchair tournaments.

The world cup organisers asked for expressions of interest for different tournaments in the summer of 2019 and received over 90 responses. Anticipated World Cup events were:

- the Masters Rugby League World Cup
- the men's and women's Armed Forces World Cup
- the men's and women's Student World Cup
- the men's Emerging Nations World Championship and the inaugural women's Emerging Nations World Championship
- the men's Police World Cup
- the Physical Disability Rugby League World Cup

On 27 August 2020 the organising body announced the postponement of the festival due to fund raising and squad selection issues for the participating nations caused by the COVID-19 pandemic, though World Cup events for the physical disability and masters variants were rescheduled.

==== Physical Disability ====
The inaugural Physical Disability Rugby League World Cup went ahead between 23 and 30 October in Warrington. Australia, England, New Zealand, and Wales competed in a single round-robin tournament with the top two teams facing off in a final at the Halliwell Jones Stadium. The draw was made for the match schedule on 29 July 2022 during an episode of Channel 4's The Last Leg; presenter Adam Hills announced his intention to be part of the Australian squad. England beat New Zealand 42–10 in the final to become world champions, whilst Wales claimed third place after a technical infringement saw the result of their opening group stage match overturned.

===== Group stage =====
Pos	Team	Pld	W	D	L	PF	PA	PD	Pts	Qualification
1	England	3	3	0	0	140	14	+126	6	Advance to Final
2	New Zealand	3	1	0	2	62	104	−42	4 (Note: New Zealand v Wales: Due to a rules breach by Wales the match points were awarded to New Zealand)	Advance to Final
3	Wales	3	2	0	1	68	78	−10	2	
4	Australia	3	0	0	3	52	126	−74	0	

Updated to match(es) played on 28 October 2022. Source:

===== Finals =====
Final
30 October – Warrington
England	42
New Zealand	10
Third place
30 October – Warrington
Wales	32
Australia	10

==== International masters ====
The International Masters festival went ahead on 13 November at York St John University. Australia, Canada, England, France, Ireland, and Wales took part.

== Broadcasting ==
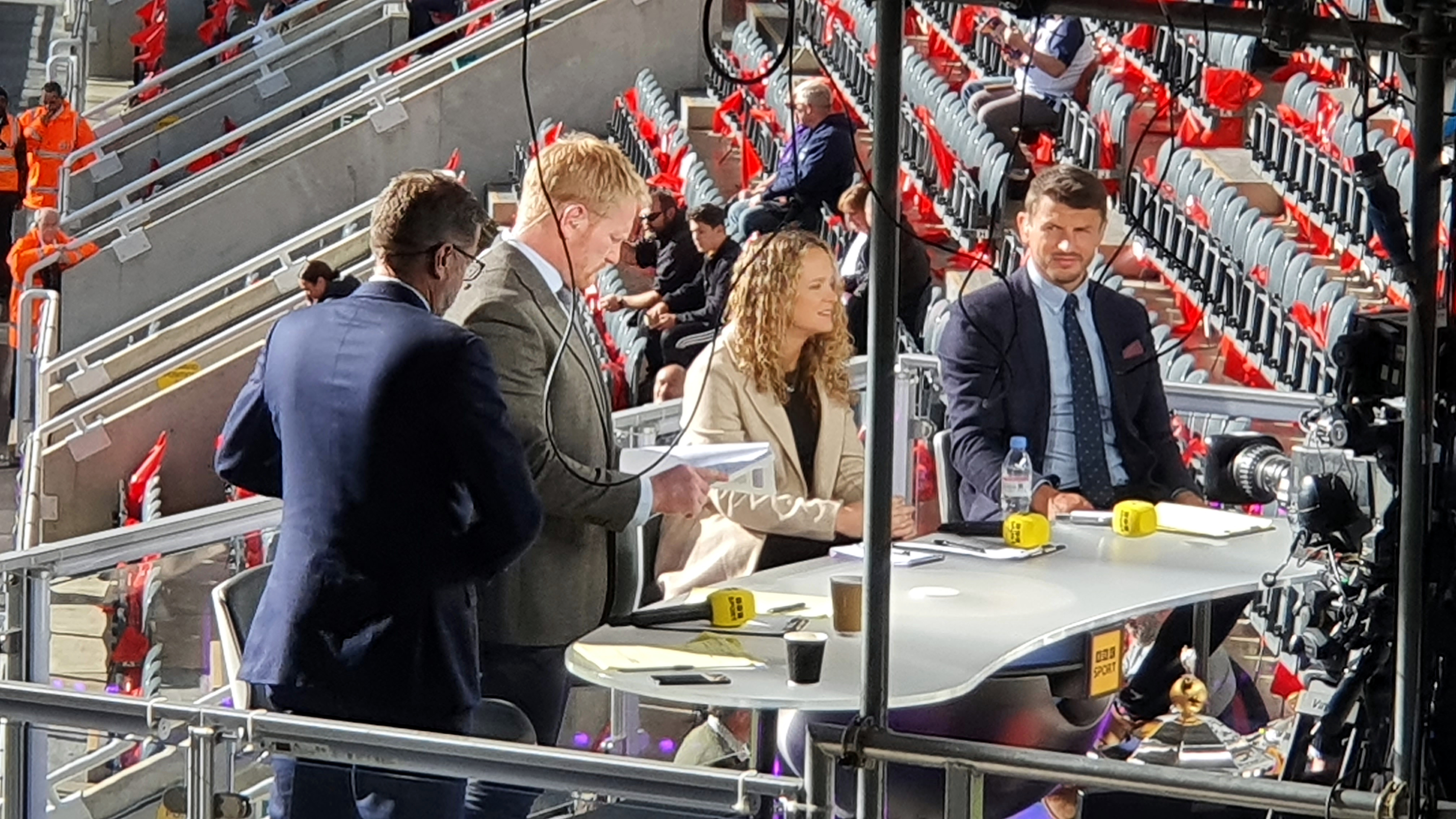
The BBC pundits ahead of the launch of the 2021 Rugby League World Cup

The Rugby League World Cup announced a partnership with the International Rugby League (IRL) in July 2020. The organisations worked together on match broadcast production and the sale of global broadcast rights.

In April 2019, it was reported that the digital strategy for the tournament would be led by Deloitte. In May 2019, the world cup organisers announced they were looking for an esport partner to engage new audiences with the sport.

In the United Kingdom, the BBC were awarded the broadcasting rights for free as a strategic move to get more eyes on the game.

This marked the last time that the BBC had televised its broadcasting rights to show the Rugby League World Cup on free-to-air television. From 2026, Premier Sports will take over the broadcasting rights under paywall television to show the 2026 Rugby League World Cup.

=== List of broadcasters ===
Region	Broadcaster	Free-to-Air/ Subscription	Details
Australia	Foxtel (Fox League and Kayo Sports)	Subscription	All 61 matches across the three tournaments.
Denmark; Estonia; Finland; Iceland; Latvia; Lithuania; Netherlands; Norway; Poland; Sweden	Viaplay	Subscription	31 matches
France	BeIN Sports	Subscription	All 61 matches across the three tournaments.
France	Sport en France	Free	All France men's, women's and wheelchair national team games and tournament finals.
New Zealand	Spark Sport	Subscription	All 61 matches live across the 31 men's, 15 women's and 15 wheelchair.
New Zealand	Three	Free	Delayed coverage of all Kiwis and Kiwi Ferns matches.
Papua New Guinea	EM TV	Free	All 61 matches live across the 31 men's, 15 women's and 15 wheelchair.
United Kingdom	BBC	Free	All 61 matches live on BBC One or BBC Two as well as on BBC iPlayer, a Venue launch programme, highlights programme, the opening and closing matchdays of the 2021 Physical Disability Rugby League World Cup, and the commission of two rugby league themed documentaries; Clive Sullivan: Rugby League Legend and Women of Steel.
United Kingdom	OurLeague App	Subscription	All 31 matches live, exclusive post match interviews and OuRLeague highlights programme.
United Kingdom	RugbyAM (FreeSports)	Free	Highlights programme and post match interviews.
Germany; Italy; Spain; United States; Canada; Mexico; Central America; South America; Japan	FITE TV	Subscription	All 61 matches across the three tournaments live on pay per view, with select men's matches and the entire women's and wheelchair tournaments available through the FITE+ subscription service. The majority of men's matches also aired on linear pay per view through cable and satellite providers in the United States and Canada, as well as In Demand's PPV.com website in the United States.

== Marketing ==
=== Sponsorship ===
Official sponsors	Partners
Cazoo – Principal Sponsor; Assura – Community Health Partner; Kappa – Apparel Partner; Eversheds Sutherland – Legal Services Partner; Deloitte – Professional Services Partner; Kuehne + Nagel Group – Logistics Partner; Manchester Metropolitan University – University Partner; The National Lottery – Official Partner; New Era – Headwear Partner; Pepsi MAX – Soft Drink Partner; Gatorade – Sports Drink Partner; Selco Builders Warehouse – Builders' Merchant Partner; NuArca Labs – NFT Partner; CoinEx – Cryptocurrency Trading Platform Partner	Community Integrated Care; Department for Digital, Culture, Media and Sport; Movember; Northern Powerhouse; International Rugby League; Rugby Football League; Sport England; UK Sport; UNICEF; Sports for Climate Action

== Legacy ==
The legacy of the RLWC2021 is the long-term impact of the combined World Cup tournaments. Named InspirationALL in October 2018, the chairman of the world cup organising committee, Jon Dutton, said "economic benefit is about 10% of what we’re focusing on, and 90% is the social benefit."

=== Created by RLWC 2021 ===
The first project launched is a £10 million fund to develop facilities under the banner of "Created by RLWC 2021" was launched concurrently with the legacy announcement in October 2018 and enables sports clubs to apply for funds to develop facilities The funding comes from the Department for Digital, Culture, Media and Sport (DCMS) and £9 million is allocated for major grants (over £15,000) and £1 million for smaller applications. The fund is administered by the Rugby Football League (RFL) in conjunction with Sport England.

The first major grants were announced in June 2019 and saw monies allocated for the construction of new clubhouses and changing facilities at locations in Salford and Shevington. £90,000 of minor grant funding was announced in July with 20 projects across England receiving funding.

In May 2021 it was announced that the National Lottery (United Kingdom) partner with the tournament to strengthen the CreatedBy program and allow RLWC2021 to deliver more projects to the community clubs especially those affected by the COVID-19 pandemic. The investment accompanied National Lottery sponsorship on RLWC2021 matchdays.

Wheelchair teams were created by Hull KR and Salford Red Devils in response to the massive increase in popularity of wheelchair rugby league following the world cup.

=== Inspired by RLWC 2021 ===
The second project is "Inspired by RLWC 2021" which aims to get more people involved with rugby league. The first product, a resource pack on introducing and teaching rugby league in primary schools was released in July 2019.

=== Empowered by RLWC 2021 ===
The third project and yet to be launched is "Empowered by RLWC 2021" which has the aim of involving people in the communities where the tournaments take place both in assisting at the tournaments but also continuing that involvement with rugby league afterwards by becoming involved with community rugby league clubs.

=== Climate Action ===
RLWC 2021 pledged their commitment to the United Nations Sports for Climate Action Framework in 2018. One of just four UK based sporting bodies to do so.

==== Tree for a Try ====
In partnership with the tournament's Logistics Partner, Kuehne + Nagel, it was announced that for every try scored across the Men's, Women's and Wheelchair tournaments, a tree would be planted. The trees will predominantly be planted in Brazil, one of the nations competing in the Women's tournament

==== Ceremonial Trees ====
21 ceremonial trees will be planted across host towns and cities in England.

== Attendance and viewing ==
The 2021 Rugby League World Cup became the most viewed edition of the World Cup with television viewing surpassing 30 million in England alone.

Before the start of the semi-finals, the opening match of the men's tournament saw the largest television viewing figures with 1.8 million. England vs Canada and England v Australia saw the largest viewing figures for a women's and wheelchair match respectively, both attracting a peak of 700,000.

The England v Papua New Guinea men's quarter final broke the record for the largest stadium audience for a Rugby League World Cup quarter final of 23,179.

England v Spain broke the attendance record for a wheelchair rugby league match with 3,268 in attendance. The record previous broke by the opening match of England v Australia.

England v Canada was also the highest attendance women's game in the northern hemisphere with 8,621.

At the men's semi-finals stage, the 2021 semi finals were the sixth and second best attended semi-finals in world cup history attracting 28,113 and 40,489 fans respectively.

The men's final, attracting 67,502, was the fourth best attended rugby league world cup match in history.

== See also ==
- 2026 Rugby League World Cup (disambiguation)
