= Rugby league in New Zealand =

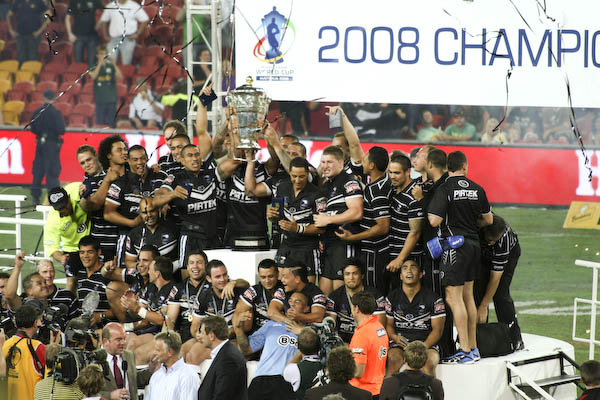
- New Zealand celebrating their 2008 Rugby League World Cup victory
- Country: New Zealand
- Governing body: New Zealand Rugby League
- National team: New Zealand
- Nickname: Kiwis
- First played: 13 June 1908, Wellington
- Registered players: 35,800 (total); 10,969 (youth); 8,319 (women)
- Clubs: 176

Club competitions
- National Rugby League (1 team); Lion Red Cup (now defunct); Bartercard Cup (now defunct); Bartercard Premiership (now defunct); NZRL National Competition; Auckland Rugby League; Northland Rugby League; Waikato Rugby League; Taranaki Rugby League

Audience records
- Single match: 48,511 – 2026 Warriors vs Knights. Eden Park, Auckland

Rugby league in New Zealand dates to the beginning of the sport in England. New Zealand played an integral role in the history of rugby league football. Of all rugby league nations New Zealand was second only to England to compete in international competition.

== History ==
A professional New Zealand team was touring England and Australia before it was even considered that there should be a professional league in New Zealand. The first makings of a New Zealand rugby football schism, such as seen in other countries was the creation of Albert Henry Baskerville who set out to sign a group of professional rugby players to tour England. Baskerville's team of professional "All Golds", on their way to England, made a stop over in Australia, playing a 3-game series against a professional New South Wales rugby team. From there, they went on to England and for the first time, played by the Rugby Football League's rules. On their return home, they stopped over in Australia to play another 10 games against clubs from the newly formed New South Wales Rugby League. During the All Gold's tour, their founder, Baskerville fell ill and later died of pneumonia. 13 June 1908 saw the first game of rugby league played by the Northern Union's new rules on New Zealand soil; as a benefit match for Baskerville's widowed mother. The first match in New Zealand was played at Wellington on 13 June 1908 before a crowd of nearly 7,000, which saw an exhibition between two teams drawn from the touring side. Rugby league now had its sights set firmly set on New Zealand, however, the New Zealand Rugby Union's dominance in New Zealand sport, government and business would prove a lot tougher than the unions of Australia or England. The NZRU took it upon themselves to pressure potential converts, officials, sponsors and ground owners into not giving the rugby league upstarts any room to move. The Wellington Rugby Union even went to the length of naming, under false pretenses, famous players in the team lineup for a match at Athletic Park in order to lure interest away from a Northern Union match being played in Petone on the same day. None of this succeeded in stopping the establishment of the game and by 1910 it was being played in Auckland, Taranaki, Rotorua, Nelson, Southland, Wanganui, Marlborough, Invercargill, Hawke's Bay, and South Auckland. The New Zealand Rugby League was formed in 1909 and other provinces joined the league. In the year after that, Auckland Rugby League became the first to start a regular competition. The Auckland League had a full season in 1912, with its headquarters at Eden Park. That same year saw the formation of Wellington's local rugby league competition. In 1913 Henry Thacker set up the Canterbury Rugby Football League, donating the Thacker Shield.

By the early 1990s New South Wales' club competition matches were being broadcast in New Zealand with far greater viewing numbers than that of domestic rugby union. A New Zealand club team, the Auckland Warriors, was added to the top-level Australian Rugby League competition in 1995. Soon after when the Australian Super League war shook the game to its very foundations in that country, the New Zealand Rugby League, along with the governing body in Britain, aligned itself with Super League. The Warriors continued to participate in the National Rugby League competition after many expansion teams were cut and foundation teams merged. In 2001 the club's name was changed to New Zealand Warriors.

In 2005, the New Zealand national side won the Tri-Nations final, beating Australia 24–0. This was the first series defeat of Australia in 25 years and also their equal biggest losing margin. The New Zealand national team won the Rugby League World Cup for the first time in 2008.

In 2009, the much-mooted State of Origin-like concept called "Kiwi Roots", which would involve two domestic New Zealand representative teams playing each other, was announced to commence in 2010. but has yet to eventuate.

In 2010 a poll released by UMR Research showed that in Auckland, home of the Warriors, more people were interested in the NRL premiership (33%) than rugby union's ITM Cup (26%). The finals form of the Warriors in 2011 increased the NRL's television audience in New Zealand by 29 per cent that year.

== Governing body ==
The New Zealand Rugby League is responsible for governing of rugby league in New Zealand. The Auckland Rugby League is a partner of the NZRL and is responsible for the governing the sport in the Auckland Region. The premier competition organised by the governing body of rugby league in New Zealand is the National Competition, formed in 2010. Significant former competitions included the Lion Red Cup, run from 1994–96, the Bartercard Cup, run from 2000–07, and the Bartercard Premiership, run from 2008–09.

On a regional level, the sport is administered by seven zones and fifteen districts and has seven Affiliates.

Zones

- Rugby League Northland (Northern Swords)
- Akarana (Akarana Falcons)
- Counties Manukau (Counties Manukau Stingrays)
- Upper Central (Wai-Coa-Bay Stallions)
- Mid Central (Central Vipers)
- Wellington (Wellington Orcas)
- Southern (Canterbury Bulls)

Districts

- Auckland Rugby League
- Aoraki Rugby League
- Bay of Plenty Rugby League
- Canterbury Rugby League
- Coastline Rugby League
- Gisborne Tairawhiti Rugby League
- Manawatu Rugby League
- Otago Rugby League
- Southland Rugby League
- Rugby League Hawke's Bay
- Taranaki Rugby League
- Tasman Rugby League
- Waikato Rugby League
- Wellington Rugby League
- West Coast Rugby League
- Whangarei City & Districts

Affiliates

- Kiwis Association
- Masters of Rugby League
- Defence Forces
- Māori Rugby League
- Universities and Tertiary Students
- Women's Rugby League
- Pacific Island Rugby League

New Zealand based teams also take part in Australian competitions. New Zealand Warriors are the only non-Australian team in the National Rugby League and the New South Wales Cup.

== National Competition ==
The NZRL National Competition (previously called the "National Zonal Competition") is the top-level rugby league competition run by the New Zealand Rugby League. In 2010 the competition replaced the Bartercard Premiership following a Sparc funded review and restructure of the New Zealand Rugby League. Since 2019, the competition has consisted of a four-team national premiership and an eight-team national championship (split into North and South Island Conferences) with a promotion and relegation between the two divisions.

== Teams playing in Australia ==
The National Rugby League (NRL) is Australia's top-level competition for the sport of rugby league and the New Zealand Warriors are New Zealand's only team in the NRL; in addition they have a "B team" in the NSW Cup, one of Australia's second tier state competitions. The club also fields a team in the NRL Women's Premiership. Wellington Orcas unsuccessfully bid for a National Rugby League licence in 2006. In May 2022, NRL CEO Andrew Abdo mentioned a second New Zealand team to be an option for a potential 18th NRL Team.

| Club | Location | Home Ground | Timespan |
|---|---|---|---|
| New Zealand Warriors | Auckland | Mt Smart Stadium | 1995–present (NRL) |
| New Zealand Warriors | Auckland | Mt Smart Stadium | 2023–present (NSW Cup) |
| New Zealand Warriors | Auckland | Mt Smart Stadium | 2018–2020, 2025 (NRLW) |

== National team ==
The New Zealand national rugby league team represent New Zealand at rugby league, and are commonly known as the Kiwis, after the native bird of that name. They are administered by the New Zealand Rugby League. On 22 October 2008, The Kiwis defeated Australia to win their first Rugby League World Cup. The team's most recent title came in the 2014 Rugby League Four Nations tournament by beating Australia, which brings their Rugby League Four Nations championships total to two. The national team reached the semi-finals of the 2021 Rugby League World Cup where they were knocked out by Australia. The Kiwis are currently the number two ranked rugby league nation (as of December 2022).

== Physical disability rugby league ==
Physical disability rugby league (PDRL) was established in New Zealand in 2015 through Physical Disability Rugby League New Zealand (PDRLNZ). The sport provides opportunities for people with physical disabilities to participate in rugby league.

The New Zealand physical disability national rugby league team first competed internationally in 2018, participating in the 2018 Rugby League Commonwealth Championship in Brisbane and the 2018 Emerging Nations World Championship in Sydney.

New Zealand finished as runners-up at the inaugural 2021 Physical Disability Rugby League World Cup, held in England in 2022. In November 2024, New Zealand defeated Australia 20–18 at Mount Smart Stadium in Auckland in its first home international match.

The national team again finished as runners-up at the 2026 Physical Disability Rugby League World Cup in Australia.

== Wheelchair Rugby League ==
Wheelchair rugby league saw its introduction to New Zealand in November 2024 after the formation of a national side to host two games against Australia. The team was formed by New South Wales head coach and Australia assistant coach Edie George, and selected players from the New Zealand wheelchair basketball competitions and New Zealanders playing in Australia. The team lost both fixtures, having had only five hours of training prior to the first game.

== See also ==
- List of New Zealand rugby league clubs
