= 2026 Rugby League World Cup final =

The 2026 Rugby League World Cup final may refer to:

- 2026 Men's Rugby League World Cup final, a rugby league match to determine the winner of the 2026 Men's Rugby League World Cup
- 2026 Women's Rugby League World Cup final, a rugby league match to determine the winner of the 2026 Women's Rugby League World Cup
- 2026 Wheelchair Rugby League World Cup final, a rugby league match to determine the winner of the 2026 Wheelchair Rugby League World Cup
- 2026 Physical Disability Rugby League World Cup final, a rugby league match to determine the winner of the 2026 Physical Disability Rugby League World Cup

== See also ==
- 2026 Rugby League World Cup (disambiguation)
