= Rugby in New Zealand =

Rugby in New Zealand may refer to:

== Rugby league ==
- Rugby league in New Zealand (main article)
  - New Zealand national rugby league team
  - New Zealand Rugby League, the format for rugby league in New Zealand
  - List of New Zealand rugby league clubs

== Rugby union ==
- Rugby union in New Zealand (main article)
  - New Zealand Rugby Union, the federation
  - All Blacks (the national team)
  - New Zealand Māori rugby union team
  - Black Ferns (the NZ women's national team)
