= 2026 Rugby League World Cup group stage =

The 2026 Rugby League World Cup group stage may refer to:

- 2026 Men's Rugby League World Cup group stage
- 2026 Women's Rugby League World Cup group stage
- 2026 Wheelchair Rugby League World Cup group stage
- 2026 Physical Disability Rugby League World Cup group stage

== See also ==
- 2026 Rugby League World Cup (disambiguation)
