= Card (sports) =

List of matches taking place at a combat-sport event

In sports, a card lists the matches taking place in a title match combat-sport event. Cards include a main event match and the undercard listing the rest of the matches. The undercard may be divided into a midcard and a lower card, according to the perceived importance of the matches. Promoters schedule matches to occur in ascending order of importance.

== Division ==
=== Undercard ===
The undercard, or preliminary matches (sometimes preliminary card), consists of preliminary bouts that occur before the headline or "main event" of a particular boxing, professional wrestling, horse racing, or other sports event. Typically, promoters intend the undercard to provide fans with an opportunity to see up-and-coming fighters or fighters not so well known and popular as their counterparts in the main event. The undercard also ensures that if the main event ends quickly fans will still feel that they received sufficient value for the price of their admission. In boxing, undercard matches usually last between four and eight rounds, depending on the experience of the boxers in those matches (entry-level boxers, often making professional debuts, have four rounds, while boxers at the intermediate level are given between six and eight rounds), with some undercards on major championship cards being ten rounds if the boxer is at the advanced level but not participating in a championship match. If an undercard match is a championship match (less popular weight class or regional championship), the undercard match is also twelve rounds, owing to regulations.

In professional wrestling, undercard matches usually last for five to ten minutes: the audience does not have to wait too long for the main event and the promoters often have to fulfill contractual television agreements. Professional wrestling unofficially subdivides the undercard into uppercard, midcard and lower card matches, which roughly correlate to the fame and quality of performance of the wrestlers involved.

=== Support series ===
In auto racing, support races occur not just before the feature race, they occur on qualifying day where attendances are typically low and after the completion of the feature race, purposely to lessen the effect of traffic congestion outside venues common in major championship rounds, as spectators make their way home. Examples of notable support races include Porsche Supercup and FIA Formula 2, both supporting the Formula One World Championships, although the latter is considered to be a feeder series (for young drivers who desire to make the final step to Formula One). The Indy Lights series supports the IndyCar Series, and the NASCAR Xfinity Series and Craftsman Truck Series effectively support the top-tier NASCAR Cup Series. In some series (most notably on oval tracks), the support races take place on both practice and qualifying days, and there is no support race on the day of the feature (as in the case of the Cup Series, where all support races are held on days leading to the feature, although it can be run on feature day if inclement weather forces such).

In often case, the support series can outshadow the main event, most notably Japan's ''Super Silhouette'' series (1979–1984) for Group 5 'Special Production Cars'. Intending to be a support to the Fuji Grand Champion Series, it found itself to become out-dwarfed for spectator popularity as those races were often frequented by bōsōzoku members and fans of zokusha to take inspiration for their cars.

Since 2008, the Rugby League World Cup has been aggregated with the World Cup competitions for women's and wheelchair rugby league in an arrangement known as the "Festival of World Cups". The festival includes support tournaments that are held as a lead-up towards the centrepiece tournaments, such as physical disability rugby league, masters (over 35, typically retired professional players), university, police teams, and armed forces teams.

WWE's NXT brand (which is positioned as a feeder for its main Raw and SmackDown rosters) previously held events in its "TakeOver" series as support for its flagship pay-per-views (Royal Rumble, WrestleMania, SummerSlam, and Survivor Series); these events were held on the day prior to the PPV, and typically shared the same venue (or, at the very least, host city) as the corresponding main roster event. While the TakeOver branding has since been discontinued, NXT has continued to hold an annual support event on WrestleMania weekend, now known since 2021 as Stand & Deliver.

The opening act is a similar concept in non-sports entertainment.

=== Main event ===
A main event usually takes place as the final match of a title-match-system sporting event. The term occurs primarily with reference to combat sports such as boxing, professional wrestling and mixed martial arts. The main event, generally the most prestigious match on the card, has the most promotion behind it. The match commonly involves a contest for a top championship, but may feature another special attraction.

The headliner is a similar concept in non-sports entertainment.

==== Multiple main events ====
Sometimes, multiple matches of equally high importance take place on a card, occasionally at intervals throughout (to sustain spectator interest for its duration), but generally at the end in succession. This can be billed as a "double main event" or "double-header" or (rarely) as a "triple main event" or "triple-header". Advertising for sporting bouts focuses primarily on their main events.

== Supercard ==
A supercard consists of a title match combat sport event which comprises multiple high-level matches and/or special attractions. Promoters advertise supercards heavily, and tickets typically cost more than at standard-card events.

Supercards serve as the focal point of professional wrestling promotions and can function as a primary source of revenue for such promotions. Mainstream American pro wrestling holds supercards at least annually and broadcasts them on pay-per-view (PPV) television. The largest company, WWE, runs PPV events every month. Alternatively the second-largest, All Elite Wrestling (AEW) initially ran 4 annual PPV's over the year (Revolution, Double or Nothing, All Out and Full Gear), though added Forbidden Door as a fifth annual PPV in 2022 in collaboration with Japanese company New Japan Pro-Wrestling (NJPW) and in 2024 ran nine pay per views in total. Elsewhere, Impact Wrestling (formally TNA), formerly ran monthly PPVs, but now only runs four a year. Wrestling supercards often recur annually; WWE's WrestleMania, arguably the most famous of these, has run since 1985. WWE runs three other supercards per year (Royal Rumble, SummerSlam and Survivor Series), but does not promote these at the level of WrestleMania. With TNA's 2013 change to running only four PPVs a year, all four are now considered supercards: Genesis (not a supercard before 2013), Lockdown, Slammiversary, and Bound for Glory. All four events were first held in 2005, and all have taken place annually since then except for Genesis, which was not held in 2008. Examples of non-pay-per-view supercards include Saturday Night's Main Event and Clash of the Champions. Promotions outside the United States also run annual supercards. The two largest lucha libre promotions in Mexico, Consejo Mundial de Lucha Libre (CMLL) and Lucha Libre AAA Worldwide (AAA), respectively run the CMLL Anniversary Show and Triplemanía. New Japan Pro-Wrestling (NJPW) runs the January 4 Dome Show (branded since 2007 as Wrestle Kingdom) at the Tokyo Dome.

In other sports, such as boxing and mixed martial arts, supercards occur more rarely. They usually involve a "dream fight" and multiple title defenses. In Japanese Mixed Martial Arts, due its origin and influence from professional wrestling, supercards have traditionally been associated with large-scale events held on New Year's Eve, with promotions such as PRIDE Fighting Championships, K-1, DREAM, and Rizin Fighting Federation staging major cards on December 31. These events typically featured multiple high-profile bouts, including championship fights and matches between internationally recognized fighters, and were promoted as major sporting spectacles.
