= 2026 Rugby League World Cup qualification =

2026 Rugby League World Cup qualification may refer to:

- 2026 Men's Rugby League World Cup qualification, the methods in which teams qualified for the 2026 Men's Rugby League World Cup
- 2026 Women's Rugby League World Cup qualification, the methods in which teams qualified for the 2026 Women's Rugby League World Cup
- 2026 Wheelchair Rugby League World Cup qualification, the methods in which teams qualified for the 2026 Wheelchair Rugby League World Cup

== See also ==
- 2026 Rugby League World Cup (disambiguation)
- World cup of rugby (disambiguation)
