= Football in New Zealand (disambiguation) =

Football in New Zealand can refer to

- Association football in New Zealand
- Rugby league in New Zealand
- Rugby union in New Zealand
- Australian rules football in New Zealand
