= 2021 Rugby League World Cup qualification =

2021 Rugby League World Cup qualifying may refer to:

- 2021 Men's Rugby League World Cup qualification, the methods in which teams qualified for the 2021 Men's Rugby League World Cup
- 2021 Women's Rugby League World Cup qualification, the methods in which teams qualified for the 2021 Women's Rugby League World Cup
- 2021 Wheelchair Rugby League World Cup qualification, the methods in which teams qualified for the 2021 Wheelchair Rugby League World Cup

== See also ==
- 2021 Rugby League World Cup (disambiguation)
- World cup of rugby (disambiguation)
