= 2026 Rugby League World Cup squads =

The 2026 Rugby League World Cup squads may refer to:

- 2026 Men's Rugby League World Cup squads, ten international twenty-four-man squads competing in the men's competition
- 2026 Women's Rugby League World Cup squads, eight international twenty-four-woman squads competing in the women's competition
- 2026 Wheelchair Rugby League World Cup squads, eight international twelve-man squads competing in the wheelchair competition
- 2026 Physical Disability Rugby League World Cup squads, three international squads competing in the physical disability competition

== See also ==
- 2026 Rugby League World Cup (disambiguation)
- 2026 Rugby League World Cup qualification
