= Scott Hallsworth =

Australian chef, restaurateur and author (born 1975)

Scott Hallsworth (born 12 July 1975) is an Australian chef, restaurateur and author.

Hallsworth owns and is executive chef of restaurants in London. Hallsworth founded and ran three Kurobuta restaurants located in the city's Chelsea, Knightsbridge and Marble Arch areas until May 2017.

Hallsworth's flagship Japanese izakaya was in Kurobuta Marble Arch. The original incarnation of Kurobuta London was located in Chelsea. In November 2015, Hallsworth opened his third Kurobuta, on the fifth floor of Harvey Nichols's Knightsbridge location.

In March 2015, Hallsworth opened Joe's Oriental Diner on the site of the original Kurobuta Chelsea pop-up at 251 King's Road, Chelsea.

Hallsworth opened Kurochan at the Mandarin Oriental in Bodrum, Turkey, in the summer of 2014.

In 2015, he has been forced to turn off Kurobuta's neon signs saying “prostitutes available” and “sluts” in Japanese after angering women's rights campaigners and local Japanese journalists.

Hallsworth sold his Kurobuta restaurant group in June 2017.

In July 2017 Hallsworth opened his pan-Asian Freakscene pop-up restaurant concept in Clerkenwell.

In March 2018 Hallsworth opened a permanent Freakscene restaurant in London's West End at 54 Frith Street in Soho.

In March 2023 Hallsworth opened a permanent Freak Scene restaurant in partnership with the Australian comedian, radio and television presenter Adam Hills, in the Parsons Green area of London's Fulham at 28 Parsons Green Lane in Parsons Green.

In January 2024 Hallsworth opened a second, permanent Freak Scene restaurant in partnership with Hills, in the Balham area of London at 1, Ramsden Road, Balham, SW12 8QZ.

== Early life ==
Hallsworth was born and raised in Collie, Western Australia. As a teenager he was an avid cross country runner and twice raced at national events, where his highest placing was 6th. He also competed at state level track and field events and won silver medals for both 800m and 1500m events. Influenced by his brothers Craig and Gary, who were in Perth-based bands in the 1980s The Bamboos and Healers, Hallsworth formed several small garage bands while in high school.

== Career ==
Hallsworth left high school when he was 16 to take up an offer of an apprenticeship with ex-La Gavroche sous chef Alain Doisneau. As an apprentice, Hallsworth went on to compete in cooking competitions, during which his achievements included a Gold medal 3rd year apprentice at the Western Australian state competition which lead to inclusion on the Western Australian State cooking team. At national level, Hallsworth won Gold for his pastry and a Bronze award for his buffet work.

Post-apprenticeship, Hallsworth moved to Perth where he worked for the Hyatt Hotel and the popular 44 King Street Brasserie. Following a 6-week road trip around Australia, Hallsworth decided to stay and work at Hayman Island Resort, situated on the Great Barrier Reef in North Queensland.

Hallsworth joined Nobu London in 2001 as a chef de partie. Hallsworth spent six years at the Michelin starred Park Lane address where he became head chef.

In 2007, Hallsworth moved to Melbourne, Australia to work on the opening of Nobu Melbourne. The following year, in 2008, Hallsworth moved to Dubai to help open Mirai restaurant. In 2009, Hallsworth opened his third restaurant in three years, Wabi in Horsham, West Sussex. In 2012, Hallsworth oversaw the opening of Wabi London.

In 2013, Hallsworth created, devised and opened the Kurobuta concept.

== Books and media ==
A book by Hallsworth, The Japanese Foie Gras Project, was published in 2007, and contains a foreword by Nobuyuki Matsuhisa.

Hallsworth's barbecue pork belly in steamed buns with spicy peanut soy appeared on Channel 4 cooking programme The Sunday Brunch with Tim Lovejoy and Simon Rimmer on 11 May 2014.

Giles Coren reviewed Kurobuta in The Times on 7 June 2014, and awarded the restaurant nine out of ten for food.

A book by Hallsworth, Junk Food Japan, was published in 2017, and contains specially commissioned photography by David Loftus.

== Awards ==
On 10 October 2014, Hallsworth was awarded two AA Rosettes for Culinary Excellence, 2014–2015.

On 7 April 2015, Hallsworth's Kurobuta restaurant was awarded the BMW Square Meal Award for Best New Restaurant.

== Personal life ==
Hallsworth loves to cook at home and will barbecue in any weather. He has three children. He likes to mountain bike, play guitar, snowboard and travel.
