= List of rugby league clubs in New Zealand =

Rugby league clubs in New Zealand

This is an incomplete list of past and present rugby league clubs in New Zealand.

== National teams ==
- New Zealand national rugby league team
- New Zealand Kiwiferns
- New Zealand Māori
- New Zealand Residents/New Zealand 'A'
- Junior Kiwis
- New Zealand physical disability national rugby league team
- New Zealand national wheelchair rugby league team

== NRL Club sides ==
- New Zealand Warriors

=== Defunct ===
- Auckland Lions
- Auckland Vulcans

== Zonal teams ==
- Northern Districts (Swords)
- Auckland Zone
- Counties Manukau
- Wai-Coa-Bay (Stallions)
- Mid-Central
- Wellington (Orcas)
- South Island

== District teams ==
- Northland Rugby league team (Swords)
- Auckland Rugby league team (Vulcans)
- Akarana Rugby League Team (Falcons)
- Counties Manukau Rugby League Team (Stingrays)
- Waikato Rugby league team (Mana)
- Bay of Plenty Rugby league team (Stags)
- Coastline Rugby league team (Mariners)
- Taranaki Rugby league team (Sharks)
- Manawatu Rugby league team (Mustangs)
- Gisborne Tairawhiti Rugby league team (Lions)
- Hawkes Bay Rugby league team (Unicorns)
- Wellington Rugby league team (Orcas)
- Tasman Rugby league team (Titans)
- Canterbury Rugby league team (Bulls)
- Aoraki Rugby league team (Eels)
- West Coast Rugby league team (Chargers)
- Otago Rugby league team (Whalers)
- Southland Rugby league team (Rams)

== Regional competitions ==
=== Northland ===
- Kaikohe Lions
- Moerewa Tigers
- Takahiwai
- Otangarei Knights
- Hokianga Pioneers
- Portland Panthers
- Northern Wairoa Bulls
- Horahora Broncos
- Pawarenga Broncos
- Otaua Valleys Warriors
- Otaika Eagles
- Hikurangi Stags
- Hokianga Pioneers
- Marist United
- Manaia RL Club
- Muriwhenua Falcons
- Valleys United Crushers

==== Junior Clubs ====
- Whanau RL Club
- Otaika Sea Eagles

=== Auckland ===
- Ponsonby Ponies (1908)
- Manukau Magpies (1910)
- Northcote Tigers (1910)
- Otahuhu Leopards (1911)
- Ellerslie Eagles (1912)
- Richmond Bulldogs (1913)
- Marist Saints (1919)
- Pt Chevalier Pirates (1919)
- Mt Albert Lions (1928)
- Papakura Sea Eagles (1931)
- Glenora Bears (1931)
- City Newton Dragons (1948)
- Mount Wellington Warriors (1948)
- Te Atatu Roosters (1955)
- Manurewa Marlins (1960)
- Howick Hornets (1961)
- Mangere East Hawks (1963)
- Glenfied Greyhounds (1964)
- New Lynn Stags (1967)
- East Coast Bays Barracudas (1977)
- Bay Roskill Vikings (1979)
- Hibiscus Coast Raiders (1982)
- Kaipara Lancers (2011)
- Otara Scorpions
- Pakuranga Jaguars
- Papatoetoe Panthers
- Pukekohe Pythons
- Rodney Rams
- Tuakau Broncos
- Waiheke Rams
- Waitemata Seagulls
- Waiuku

=== Wai-Coa-Bay ===
==== Waikato ====
- Turangawaewae
- Taniwharau
- Ngaruawahia Panthers
- Hukanui
- Hamilton City Tigers
- Hillcrest Hornets
- Te Awamutu Firehawks
- Rangiriri Eels
- Huntly South
- College Old Boys
- Fairfield Falcons
- Otorohanga Tigers
- Taharoa Coast Steelers
- Hauraki Tigers
- Te Iti Rearea

==== Coastline ====
- Otumoetai Eels
- Tauranga City Sharks
- Te Paamu
- Te Puna
- Papamoa Bulldogs
- TePuke Tigers

==== Bay of Plenty ====
- Pikiao Warriors
- Ngongotaha Chiefs
- Rotorua Central Lions
- Taupo Phoenix
- Pacific Sharks
- Forestlands Falcons
- Kawerau Raiders
- tauhara te maunga
- Matakana Island Rebels

=== Western Alliance ===
==== Taranaki ====
- Western Suburbs /Tigers
- Bell Block Marist /Dragons
- Waitara /Bears
- Hawera /Hawks
- Coastal /Cobras
- Normanby-Okaiawa /Knights
- Patea / Warriors

==== Manawatu ====
- Levin /Wolves- Wanderers- Taitoko United- Knights- Lions
- Linton /Cobras
- Palmerston North /Kia Ora Warriors
- Otaki /Whiti Te Ra
- Marton /Bears
- Foxton /Rebels
- Waiouru /Bobcats
- Ohakea /Magpies
- Dannevirke /Tigers
- Whanganui /Vikings - Boxon - Castlecliff /Seagulls
- City Titans
- Pahiatua Panthers
- Massey Mako
- Taihape /Mokai Patea
- Feilding /Falcons

=== Eastern Alliance ===
==== Hawkes Bay ====
- Bridge Pa sports club
- Maraenui Phoenix Rugby League
- EITSA
- Tapuae
- Te Rangatahi o Omahu
- Western Suburbs
- Flaxmere Falcons rugby league
- Otane sports club
- Clive Cougars

==== Gisborne competition ====
These are the teams that have registered in Gisborne competitions over the years:

- Manutuke Mustangs
- Moana Toa
- Paikea Whalers
- Kaiti Devils
- Turanga Panthers
- Gisborne United Bulldogs
- Repongaere Eels
- Mahaki Warriors
- Whakaki Kirituna
- Wairoa Tigers
- Uawa Nasties
- Ruatoria Raiders
- Turanga Panthers
- Waengapu Stallions
- Tapuae Taniwha
- Te Urewera Raiders
- Knights
- Kahawai
- Seeka Falcons

Accurate as of: 2012

=== Wellington ===
- Kapiti Bears (Raumati-Paraparaumu)
- Wainuiomata Lions
- Te Aroha Eels (Waiwhetu-Lower Hutt)
- Upper Hutt Tigers (Trentham-Upper Hutt)
- Petone Panthers (Petone)
- University Hunters (Kelburn)
- Randwick Kingfishers (Naenae)
- St.George Dragons (Cannons Creek)
- North City Vikings (Ascot Park)
- Harbour City Eagles (Berhampore)
- Titahi Bay Marlins*
- Harbour City Spiders*

(* denotes senior 1st division only)

==== Defunct clubs ====
- Miramar Roosters
- Marist Northern
- Trentham
- Paremata Raiders
- Porirua City Phoenix
- Taita
- Eastern Suburbs Eagles (Rugby League Park, Newtown)
- Korodale
- Naenae
- Central
- Waterside
- Hutt

=== Tasman ===
- Richmond Rabbits
- Wanderers Wolves
- Stoke Cobras

=== West Coast ===
- Runanga
- Suburbs
- Cobden-Kohinoor
- Waro-Rakau
- Brunner
- Hokitika
- Marist

=== Canterbury ===
- Addington
- Aranui
- Ashburton
- Burnham
- Celebration
- Marist
- Halswell
- Hornby
- Kaiapoi
- Linwood
- Papanui
- Riccarton
- Rolleston
- Shirley
- Sydenham
- Woolston

=== Aoraki ===
- Ashburton Barbarians
- Chertsey Oilers
- Country Cowboys
- Timaru Outlaws

=== Southland ===
- Wakatipu Giants (Queenstown)
- He Tauaa
- Cooks
- Eastern Knights
- Leopards
- Bluff Steelers
- Lonestar Cowboys
- City-INV
- Winton Warlords
- Mataura Warriors
- Panthers
- Invercargill City Tigers
- Nga Hau E Wha
- Takitimu Raiders
- Riverton Whalers
- Marist
- Castaways
- South City Eagles

=== Otago ===
- Kia Toa Tigers 1954–Present
- University Students 1954–Present
- Harbour Seals
- Bulldogs Rugby League
- South Pacific Raiders 1994–Present
- South City Dragons
- Dunedin Bears 2018 only
- Waitaki Warriors 2020–Present

== See also ==
- List of rugby league clubs in Australia
- List of rugby league clubs in Britain
