= 2021 Physical Disability Rugby League World Cup =

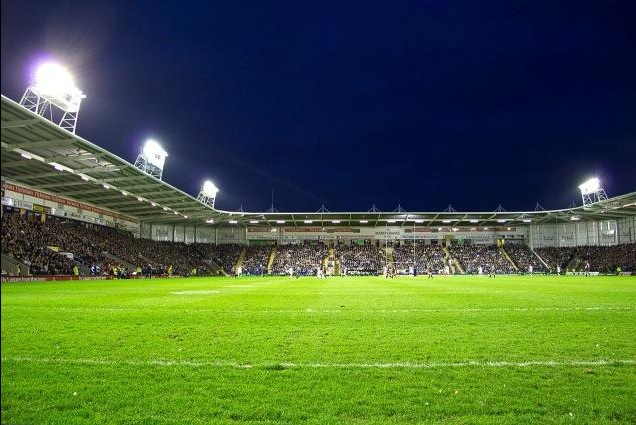
- The Halliwell Jones Stadium, the venue for the final
- Number of teams: 4
- Host country: England
- Winner: England (1st title)
- Runner-up: New Zealand
- Matches played: 8

The 2021 Physical Disability Rugby League World Cup, also known as the 2021 PDRL World Cup, was the first world cup for physical disability rugby league. The tournament was held from 23 October to 30 October 2022 in Warrington, England, alongside the main tournaments of the 2021 Rugby League World Cup. The tournament was originally planned as part of the 2021 Festival of World Cups, which was due to take place in the summer of 2021, but was rescheduled following the postponement of the festival. England defeated New Zealand 42–10 in the final to become the first world champions. Third place went to Wales who defeated Australia 32–18 in a play-off.

== Teams ==
Four teams competed in the tournament: Australia, England, New Zealand and Wales. Teams from Ireland and Scotland had also been planning to take part.

=== Squads ===
==== Australia ====
- Australia head coach: B. Pellegrino (Note: Sources disagree on the spelling of both names: either Brendon Pelligrino, Brenden Pellegrino or Brendan Pellegrino.)
1. Kane Ridgley (Gold Coast Titans)
2. Jonathan Smith (South Sydney Rabbitohs)
3. Bryce Crane (Sydney Roosters)
4. Karel Dekker (Gold Coast Titans)
5. Kyle Lloyd (Newtown Jets)
6. Dean Clark (Gold Coast Titans)
7. Hudson Wicks (Gold Coast Titans)
8. Stephen Hendry (Gold Coast Titans)
9. Harry Rodgers (Gold Coast Titans)
10. Adam Hills (Warrington Wolves)
11. Dylan Jobson (Gold Coast Titans)
12. Richard Muff (Gold Coast Titans)
13. Peter Mitchell (South Sydney Rabbitohs)
14. George Tonna (South Sydney Rabbitohs)
15. Edward Sharp (Newtown Jets)
16. Rylan Gaudron (South Sydney Rabbitohs)
17. Geoff Clarke (South Sydney Rabbitohs)
18. Fady Taiba (Wests Tigers)
19. Rylee Lowe (Sydney Roosters)
20. Michael Baker (Gold Coast Titans)

==== England ====
- England head coach: Shaun Briscoe
1. Darren Dean (Wakefield Trinity)
2. Ben Seward (Wigan Warriors)
3. Scott Gobin (Leeds Rhinos)
4. Callum Parkinson (Wakefield Trinity)
5. Nicholas Leigh (Leeds Rhinos)
6. Adam Fleming (Wakefield Trinity)
7. Sam Zellar (Leeds Rhinos)
8. Adam Morris (Warrington Wolves)
9. Jamie Barnett (Warrington Wolves)
10. Ben Nicholson (Wakefield Trinity)
11. Peter Clarke (Leeds Rhinos)
12. Harvey Redmonds (Leeds Rhinos)
13. Tommy Pouncey (Leeds Rhinos)
14. Tony Seward (Warrington Wolves)
15. Connor Lynes (Castlefield Tigers)
16. Nick Horner (Leeds Rhinos)
17. Mark Gummerson (Castlefield Tigers)
18. Mike Addison (Warrington Wolves)
19. Nick Kennedy (Castlefield Tigers)
20. John Clements (Wakefield Trinity)

==== New Zealand ====
- New Zealand head coach: Ray Greaves
1. Harley Roach
2. Garry Kingi
3. Jeremy Hendrix Harris
4. Max Walsh
5. Shane Culling
6. Timothy Ragg
7. Kent Stroobant
8. Jed Stone
9. Shane Ratahi
10. Mal Davis
11. Matthew Williams
12. Michael Kulene
13. Daley Manu
14. Che Fornusek
15. Philip Milne
16. Roko Nailolo
17. Matthew Slade
18. Delta Taeauga

==== Wales ====
- Wales head coach: Craig Fisher
1. Leif Thobroe (Port Talbot Panthers MARU)
2. Robert Carpenter (Cardiff Chiefs MARU)
3. Nick Harris (Port Talbot Panthers MARU)
4. Gareth Sullivan (Salford Red Devils PDRL)
5. Tyma Hughes (Salford Red Devils PDRL)
6. Isaac Pickett (Leeds Rhinos PDRL)
7. Morgan Jones (Salford Red Devils PDRL)
8. Daniel Shaw (Pembrokeshire Vikings MARU)
9. Connor Rice (Salford Red Devils PDRL)
10. Stewart Newton (Salford Red Devils PDRL)
11. Justin Martin (Port Talbot Panthers MARU)
12. Dylan Hughes (Leeds Rhinos PDRL)
13. Ben Lewis (Salford Red Devils PDRL)
14. Paul Jones (Salford Red Devils PDRL)
15. Chris Young (Leeds Rhinos PDRL)
16. Chris Spriggs (Llanelli Warriors MARU)

== Venues ==
Location of the venues in Warrington

The tournament took place in Warrington with all of the group stage matches and the third-place play-off at Victoria Park. The final was held at the Halliwell Jones Stadium and played as a double-header with the Samoa v France game in the Men's tournament.

== Format ==
On 29 July 2022 the draw was made for the match schedule during an episode of The Last Leg on which the main presenter, Adam Hills, announced his intention to be part of the Australian squad. The four teams competed in a round-robin group stage with the top two going on to the final and the other teams playing to determine the third and fourth places.

== Wales Technical Infringement ==
During halftime of the 28 October Wales v Australia game, it was announced that during the Wales v New Zealand game (23 October), Wales had committed an unintended technical breach. This breach was in regard to the ability classification level of the players onfield; in PDRL, ability is divided into three categories, and denoted by specific sock colours. There can be only a specific number of players per sock colour on the field at a time. The Welsh coach attributed the infraction of this rule to "miscommunications across the board", and as a result, Wales competed in the third place playoffs rather than the final competition.

== Group stage ==
Pos	Team	Pld	W	D	L	PF	PA	PD	Pts
1	England	3	3	0	0	140	14	+126	6
2	New Zealand	3	1	0	2	62	104	−42	4 (Note: New Zealand v Wales: Due to a rules breach by Wales the match points were awarded to New Zealand)
3	Wales	3	2	0	1	68	78	−10	2
4	Australia	3	0	0	3	52	126	−74	0

Updated to match(es) played on 30 October 2022. Source:
Notes:

23 October 2022
14:00 BST (UTC+01:00)

New Zealand	26–28	Wales
	Report

Victoria Park, Warrington

23 October 2022
16:30 BST (UTC+01:00)

England	58–6	Australia
	Report

Victoria Park, Warrington

25 October 2022
14:00 BST (UTC+01:00)

Wales	6–32	England
	Report

Victoria Park, Warrington

25 October 2022
16:30 BST (UTC+01:00)

Australia	26–34	New Zealand

Victoria Park, Warrington

28 October 2022
17:00 BST (UTC+01:00)

England	50–2	New Zealand
	Report

Victoria Park, Warrington

28 October 2022
19:30 BST (UTC+01:00)

Australia	20–34	Wales
	Report

Victoria Park, Warrington

== Knockout stage ==
Third-place play-off

30 October 2022
14:00 GMT (UTC±00:00)

Wales	32–18	Australia
	Report

Victoria Park, Warrington

Final

30 October 2022
19:30 GMT (UTC±00:00)

England	42–10	New Zealand
	Report

Halliwell Jones Stadium, Warrington

== Broadcasting ==
Region	Broadcaster	Details
United Kingdom	BBC	Opening two matches, third-place play-off and final on BBC iPlayer and online.
Worldwide	RLWC2021 app & OurLeague	Free streaming of all PDRL WC matches.
