= Australia physical disability national rugby league team =

Australian Physical Disability Rugby league team
Team information
- Governing body: RLIF
- Region: Asia-Pacific

Team results
- PDRL World Cup
- Appearances: 1 (first time in 2021)
- Best result: 4th, 2021

Australia has a physical disability national ruby league team which represents the country in international competitions, particularly but not exclusively in the Asia-Pacific region.

At the 2018 Rugby League Commonwealth Championship the team won the Physical Disability tournament based on their group results. They drew in the final against New Zealand. In September 2018 a squad was named to take part in a best of three series against New Zealand as part of the 2018 Emerging Nations World Championship in Sydney.

In October 2022 the team competed at the 2021 Physical Disability Rugby League World Cup where they came fourth in the tournament.

== Current squad ==
The squad for the 2021 PDRL World Cup:

1. Kane Ridgley (Gold Coast Titans)
2. Jonathan Smith (South Sydney Rabbitohs)
3. Bryce Crane (Sydney Roosters)
4. Karel Dekker (Gold Coast Titans)
5. Kyle Lloyd (Newtown Jets)
6. Dean Clark (Gold Coast Titans)
7. Hudson Wicks (Gold Coast Titans)
8. Stephen Hendry (Gold Coast Titans)
9. Harry Rodgers (Gold Coast Titans)
10. Adam Hills (Warrington Wolves)
11. Dylan Jobson (Gold Coast Titans)
12. Richard Muff (Gold Coast Titans)
13. Peter Mitchell (South Sydney Rabbitohs)
14. George Tonna (South Sydney Rabbitohs)
15. Edward Sharp (Newtown Jets)
16. Rylan Gaudron (South Sydney Rabbitohs)
17. Geoff Clarke (South Sydney Rabbitohs)
18. Fady Taiba (Wests Tigers)
19. Rylee Lowe (Sydney Roosters)
20. Michael Baker (Gold Coast Titans)

== Results ==
Date	Opponent	Score	Tournament	Venue	Refs.
23 February 2018	Commonwealth All Stars	8–0	2018 Commonwealth Championship	Dolphin Stadium, Brisbane	
23 February 2018	Commonwealth All Stars	4–0	2018 Commonwealth Championship	Dolphin Stadium, Brisbane	
23 February 2018	New Zealand	6–0	2018 Commonwealth Championship	Dolphin Stadium, Brisbane	
24 February 2018	New Zealand	0–0	2018 Commonwealth Championship	Dolphin Stadium, Brisbane	
24 February 2018	New Zealand	0–0 (Note: Final drawn: Australia won championship based on group standings)	2018 Commonwealth Championship	Dolphin Stadium, Brisbane	
9 October 2018	New Zealand	20–16	2018 ENWC Physical Disability Championship	Windsor Sporting Complex	
11 October 2018	New Zealand	10–16	2018 ENWC Physical Disability Championship	Windsor Sporting Complex	
13 October 2018	New Zealand	14–8	2018 ENWC Physical Disability Championship	St Marys Leagues Stadium	
23 October 2022	England	6–56	2021 World Cup	Victoria Park, Warrington	
25 October 2022	New Zealand	26–34	2021 World Cup	Victoria Park, Warrington	
28 October 2022	Wales	20–34	2021 World Cup	Victoria Park, Warrington	
30 October 2022	Wales	18–32	2021 World Cup	Victoria Park, Warrington	
2 November 2024	New Zealand	18–20	Friendly	Mount Smart Stadium, Auckland	
