= Adam Hills =

Australian comedian and presenter (born 1970)

Adam Hills MBE
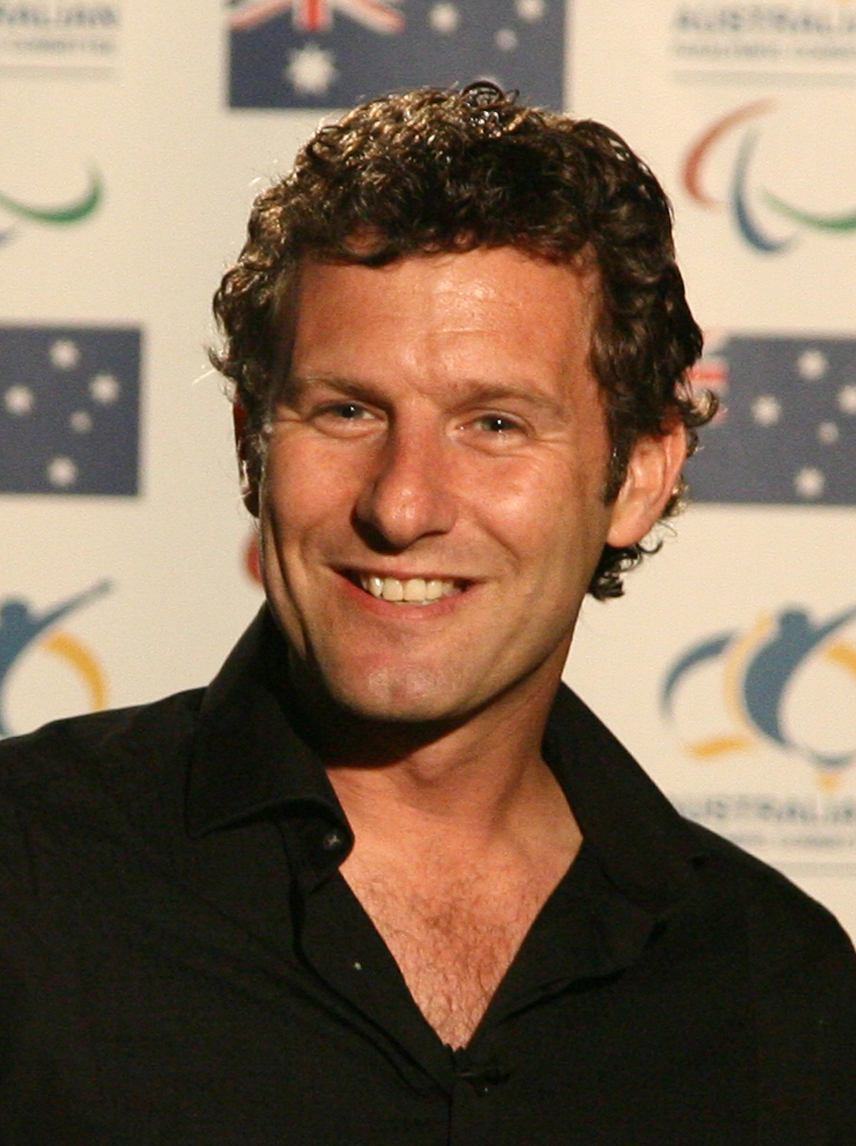
- Hills in 2008 at the Paralympic Village
- Born: Adam Christopher Hills; 10 July 1970 (age 56); Loftus, Sydney, Australia
- Education: Macquarie University (BA)
- Notable work: Spicks and Specks (2005–2011, 2018–present); Adam Hills Tonight (2011–2013); The Last Leg (2012–present)
- Spouse: Ali McGregor (m. 2009)
- Children: 2

Comedy career
- Years active: 1989–present
- Medium: Television, radio
- Genres: Social satire, observational comedy
- Subjects: Everyday life, current events, disability

Adam Christopher Hills (born 10 July 1970) is an Australian comedian, radio and television presenter. In Australia, he hosted the music quiz show Spicks and Specks from 2005 to 2011, and again in 2021 onwards, and the talk show Adam Hills Tonight from 2011 to 2013. In the United Kingdom, he has hosted the talk show The Last Leg since 2012. He has been nominated for an Edinburgh Comedy Award, the Gold Logie Award and numerous BAFTA TV Awards.

Born in Loftus, Sydney, he began performing as a stand-up comedian in 1989 at the age of 19 and, since 1997, has produced ten solo shows which have toured internationally. He has performed at the Edinburgh Festival Fringe, the Melbourne International Comedy Festival and the Montreal Just for Laughs festival, earning three consecutive Edinburgh Award nominations for his Edinburgh shows in 2001, 2002 and 2003.

In 2002, he scored a minor hit in Australia with his single "Working Class Anthem", in which he sang the lyrics of the Australian National Anthem to the tune of "Working Class Man", a song by Australian rocker Jimmy Barnes.

== Early life ==
Adam Christopher Hills was born on 10 July 1970 in Loftus, Sydney. His father, Bob Hills, was a Qantas cabin crew employee, and his childhood included free Qantas long-distance stand-by flights.

When researching his ancestry for the SBS television show Who Do You Think You Are? broadcast in 2013, Hills found that several generations of his ancestors had been German burghers in what was then Sankt Sebastiansberg in Austrian Bohemia (now Hora Svatého Šebestiána in the Czech Republic), with his great-grandfather naturalising as an Australian citizen shortly after the start of World War I. He also found that another ancestor who died in 1511 had been a notary in Aragonese-Sicilian Malta and had funded corsairs (pirates).

Hills was born without a right foot and wears a prosthesis, which later became a frequent source of comedy in his act.

He studied for a Bachelor of Arts (Communications) at Macquarie University, graduating in 1991. The university awarded their 2018 Alumni Award to Hills.

== Comedy career ==
=== Stand-up career ===
In 1989, Hills first comedy appearance was at the Sydney Comedy Store and in 1991, he wrote for Doug Mulray on radio Triple M Sydney. In 1992, he first wrote, later hosted, breakfast radio on SAFM in Adelaide, as well as stand-up gigs. His first solo show premiered in 1997, performed at Edinburgh Festival Fringe Festival and Adelaide Fringe, and was called "Stand Up and Deliver", taking its name from an Adam and the Ants song. He has travelled widely, performing at the Edinburgh Festival Fringe, the Melbourne International Comedy Festival and the Montreal Just For Laughs festival. He has been nominated for three consecutive Edinburgh Comedy Awards for his 2001, 2002 and 2003 solo shows at the Edinburgh Fringe.

The title of his 2001 show, "Go You Big Red Fire Engine", was coined during a 1999 performance in Melbourne. Hills asked an audience member to yell his name to the audience and for the audience to yell it back, but instead the man yelled "Go you big red fire engine!" The phrase quickly became an audience chant, and Hills promised he would make it the name of his next show because, he says, "it was such an uplifting and genuinely silly moment." "Go You Big Red Fire Engine" later became the name of a second stand-up show and a comedy album. It also appeared in a Detroit newspaper, on a Swedish website, and was yelled by Senator Natasha Stott Despoja in the Australian Parliament.

Hills' artificial right foot is commonly used as a source of humour in his shows and the comedian has been known to remove it and pass it around. However, he had been performing live comedy for over a decade before he made reference to his prosthesis on stage, and it was only after "Go You Big Red Fire Engine" was nominated for a Perrier Award in 2001 that he began incorporating it into his act. Hills says he felt he could too easily have become a novelty act and that he "didn't want to be known as the one-legged comedian ... I wanted to prove myself as a comic before talking about this".

At his festival shows, Hills regularly performs alongside Leanne Beer, an Auslan sign interpreter, a move sparked by a performance he did in Adelaide at a disability art conference. An interpreter had been provided at the show, and Hills found that it not only allowed the deaf audience members to enjoy his material but was also an entertaining and fascinating experience for the hearing audience members. "Now I have hearing people who will only book [for sign interpreted shows]", he says.

Some of his influences include Chris Addison, Greg Fleet, Rich Hall, Daniel Kitson, Ross Noble and David O'Doherty.

=== Television career ===
Hills hosted the music trivia show Spicks and Specks from its premiere in 2005. In late-2007, he joined the show on a national live tour dubbed the "Spicks and Speck-tacular", with appearances in Melbourne, Sydney, Brisbane, Adelaide, Newcastle and Perth. In late 2011 and early 2012, the show hit the road again for Spicks and Speck-tacular – The Finale, appearing in Sydney, Newcastle, Brisbane, Gold Coast, Wollongong, Canberra, Adelaide, Perth and Melbourne. He has also made appearances on Australian shows: Rove Live, The Glass House and The Fat, as well as the UK shows: Never Mind the Buzzcocks, Mock the Week, QI and Ask Rhod Gilbert. Additionally, he appeared on the first TV edition of BBC Northern Ireland's Great Unanswered Questions. He conducted backstage interviews at Australia's 2005 and 2006 Logie Awards and was one of three presenters at the 2007 awards.

In September 2008, Hills co-hosted the ABC coverage of the 2008 Summer Paralympics.

In July 2009, Hills appeared in Thank God You're Here; he also appeared on Good News Week.

Hills presented his own weekly talk show, Adam Hills in Gordon Street Tonight, on the ABC from early-2011. In 2012 it was renamed Adam Hills Tonight and ended with its third-season finale on 31 July 2013.

In 2012, he was part of the UK Channel 4 TV commentary team for the London 2012 Summer Paralympics, and hosted a daily alternative review of each day's events, The Last Leg with Adam Hills, with Alex Brooker and comedian Josh Widdicombe. The show was renamed The Last Leg, and was adapted for a weekly schedule to cover a comedic wrap-up of the week's events. The Last Leg has since been renewed for multiple series each year, with the 300th episode airing in March 2023.

In 2013, Hills hosted the panel game Monumental for BBC Northern Ireland. In August 2013, it was announced that Hills would present a special one-off revival episode of Channel 4's quiz show, Fifteen to One. This was broadcast on 20 September 2013, as part of the channel's 1980s-themed Back to the Future weekend of programmes. He was credited under the name "Adam C. Hills" in a tribute to the original presenter, William G. Stewart. In 2014, Hills returned to present four more celebrity specials; a full daytime series was hosted by Danish-born comedian Sandi Toksvig.

In 2014, Hills co-starred in Die on Your Feet, an Australian TV series starring several real-life comedians as fictional comics at the Melbourne International Comedy Festival.

In 2016, Hills voiced Buddy Pendergast in Thunderbirds Are Go.

In February 2022 he began hosting the Super League coverage on Channel 4.

== Other work and roles ==
In 2002, Hills released a single titled "Working Class Anthem", in which he sang the lyrics of the Australian National Anthem, "Advance Australia Fair", to the tune of "Working Class Man", a famous song by iconic Australian rocker Jimmy Barnes. Around 40 comedians contributed to the song, which made the independent top 10 in Australia. All proceeds went to the Australasian Fire and Emergency Service Authorities Council, an organisation supported by Barnes and Jon Bon Jovi that supports firefighters. Hills has performed the song several times on television, including a performance honouring Barnes' guest appearance on Spicks and Specks.

Between 2003 and 2005, Hills wrote as a columnist for the BBC's disability website Ouch!.

Hills published a memoir, Best Foot Forward, in 2018. His first book for children, "Rock Star Detectives", was published in February 2022. A second book in the series, titled "Murder at the Movies", was released in February 2023, and a third book is currently in the works.

In 2019, Adam Hills: Take His Legs was released, a sports documentary that follows the birth of the Warrington Wolves physical disability rugby league team from its creation, to the first PDRL World Club Challenge. In August 2023, a sequel documentary about the inaugural PDRL World Cup was released, titled Adam Hills: Grow Another Foot.

In February 2020 Hills became ambassador for The Children's Trust, a British charity for children with brain injury and neurodisability. He first became involved with The Children's Trust when he visited the charity in 2014 to meet Seb, a nine-year-old boy who had a severe brain injury and leg amputation following a road traffic collision. He has also supported five annual comedy shows at The Comedy Store for the charity.

Also in 2023, Hills narrated and executive produced Amputating Alice, a documentary about the journey of British Paralympic swimmer Alice Tai, who competed in the 2022 Commonwealth Games less than a year after having her right leg amputated.

In March 2023, Hills partnered with Scott Hallsworth to open a permanent Freak Scene restaurant in Parsons Green in London.

=== Rugby league ===
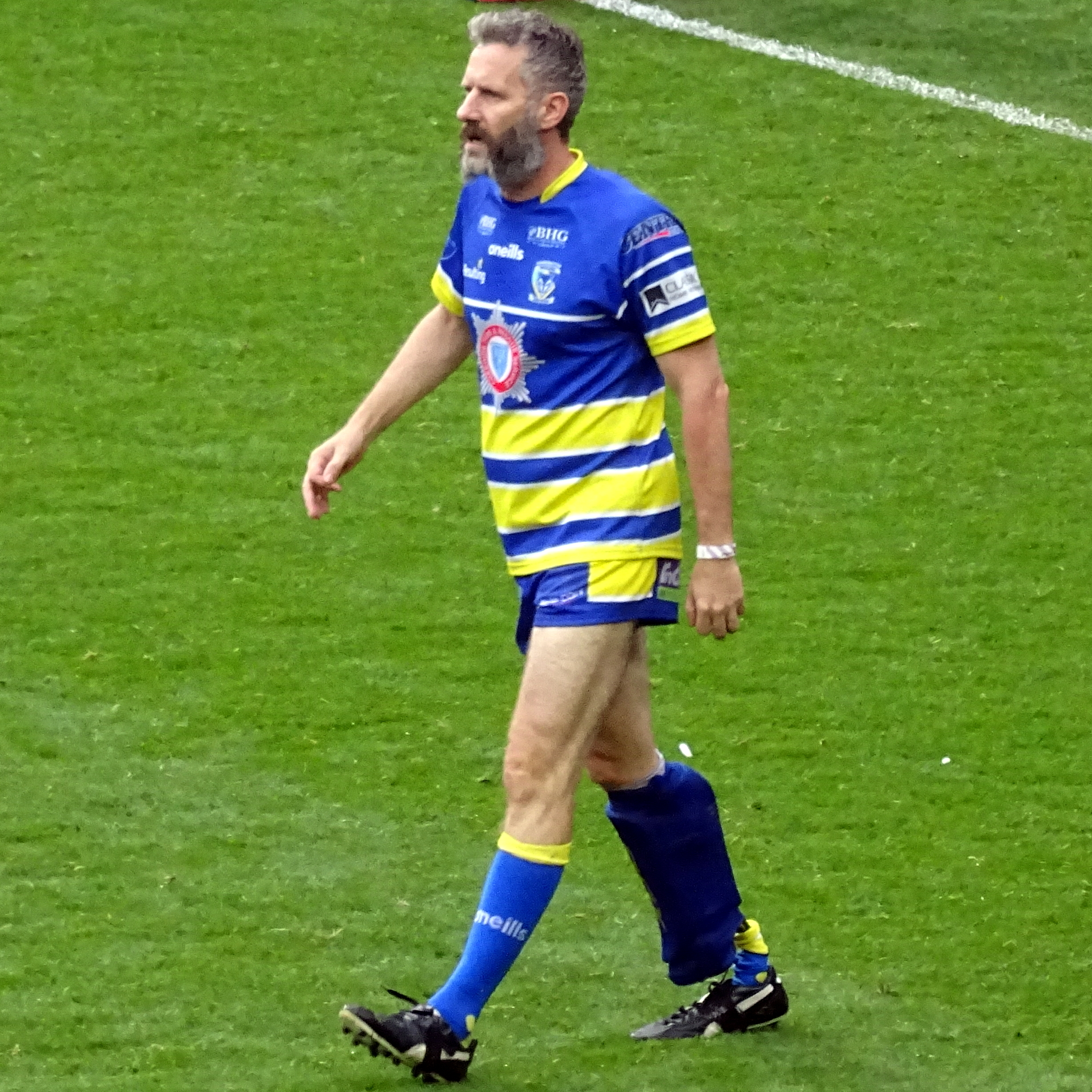
Hills playing for the Warrington Wolves PDRL side in 2019

Hills is a supporter of his hometown rugby league club the South Sydney Rabbitohs.

In 2017, Hills helped set up the Warrington Wolves Physical Disability rugby league team. In August 2018, he played in their World Club Challenge vs the South Sydney Rabbitohs, winning 34–12. Hills was also a member of Australia's team for the inaugural PDRL World Cup, as well as a spokesperson for the event.

Hills fronted Channel 4's Super League coverage during the 2022 and 2023 season, after which the broadcaster lost rights to the competition being outbid by the BBC.

In February 2025 Hills became the 33rd President of the Rugby Football League, an honorary position, in succession to the Speaker of the House of Commons, Sir Lindsay Hoyle.

== Recognition and honours ==
In April 2020 Australia Post released a set of stamps recognising Australian Legends of Comedy, with Hills appearing on one of the stamps.

Hills was appointed Member of the Order of the British Empire (MBE) in the 2022 New Year Honours for services to Paralympic sport and disability awareness. He was granted permanent residency in the UK in 2022.

In 2023, Hills received an honorary Doctor of Letters from the University of Chester for contributions to comedy and disability advocacy.

== Personal life ==
In December 2009, Hills married opera soprano Ali McGregor. They have two daughters and lived in London until just prior to the COVID-19 pandemic, when McGregor and their daughters moved back to her hometown of Melbourne, with Hills staying in London during filming periods of The Last Leg.

Hills is the Guinness record holder for: The fastest time to put on five jumpers by a team is 34.43 seconds, achieved by Alex Brooker (UK), Adam Hills (Australia) and Josh Widdicombe (UK) on the New Year's Eve Special of The Last Leg (Channel 4) at Television Centre, London, UK, on 31 December 2023.

== Solo shows ==
- Stand Up and Deliver (1997)
- Life Is Good (1998)
- My Own Little World (1999)
- Goody Two Shoes (2000)
- Go You Big Red Fire Engine (2001) – Perrier nominee
- Happy Feet (2002) – Perrier nominee
- Cut Loose (2003) – Perrier nominee
- Go You Big Red Fire Engine 2: Judgement Day (2004)
- Characterful (2006)
- Joymonger (2007)
- Inflatable (2009)
- Mess Around (2010)
- Adam Hills Stands Up Live (2012)
- Happyism (2013)
- Clown Heart (2015)
- Shoes Half Full (2021)

== Discography ==
=== Charting singles ===
List of singles, with selected chart positions
Title	Year	Peak chart positions
Title	Year	AUS
"Working Class Anthem"	2002	59

== Awards and nominations ==
=== ARIA Music Awards ===
The ARIA Music Awards are a set of annual ceremonies presented by Australian Recording Industry Association (ARIA), which recognise excellence, innovation, and achievement across all genres of the music of Australia. They commenced in 1987.

Year	Nominee / work	Award	Result	Ref.
2011	Inflatable	Best Comedy Release	Nominated	

=== Television ===
Year	Award	Category	Result	Work
2006	Logie Awards	Most Popular New Male Talent	Nominated	Spicks and Specks
2006	Logie Awards	Most Outstanding New Talent	Nominated	Spicks and Specks
2008	Logie Awards	Most Popular Personality on TV	Nominated	Spicks and Specks
2008	Logie Awards	Most Popular Presenter	Nominated	Spicks and Specks
2009	Logie Awards	Most Popular Personality on TV	Nominated	Spicks and Specks
2009	Logie Awards	Most Popular Presenter	Nominated	Spicks and Specks
2010	Logie Awards	Most Popular Personality on TV	Nominated	Spicks and Specks
2010	Logie Awards	Most Popular Presenter	Nominated	Spicks and Specks
2011	Logie Awards	Most Popular Personality on TV	Nominated	Spicks and Specks
2011	Logie Awards	Most Popular Presenter	Nominated	Spicks and Specks
2012	Logie Awards	Most Popular Personality on TV	Nominated	Adam Hills in Gordon Street Tonight, Spicks and Specks
2012	Logie Awards	Most Popular Presenter	Won	Adam Hills in Gordon Street Tonight, Spicks and Specks
2013	Logie Awards	Most Popular Personality on TV	Nominated	Adam Hills in Gordon Street Tonight
2013	Logie Awards	Most Popular Presenter	Nominated	Adam Hills in Gordon Street Tonight
2013	British Comedy Awards	Best Breakthrough Artist	Won	
2013	British Comedy Awards	Best Comedy Entertainment Program	Nominated	The Last Leg
2014	Logie Awards	Most Popular Presenter	Nominated	
2014	British Comedy Awards	Best Comedy Entertainment Personality	Nominated	
2014	British Comedy Awards	Best Comedy Entertainment Program	Nominated	The Last Leg
2015	Royal Television Society Awards	Best Entertainment Program	Won	The Last Leg
2017	British Academy Television Awards	Best Entertainment Performance	Nominated	The Last Leg
2018	British Academy Television Awards	Best Entertainment Performance	Nominated	The Last Leg
