= World cup of rugby =

Rugby football is a term that covers two separate sports, rugby league and rugby union. The administrations of both sports hold World Cup competitions for men and women, including under variant rules such as rugby league nines and rugby sevens. The term "rugby world cup" therefore can refer to more than one competition.

The sport of wheelchair rugby also holds a world cup competition. This sport, originally called murderball, is technically separate to rugby football, having no connection other than the name. A different wheelchair sport, wheelchair rugby league, is specifically a variant of rugby league. Both wheelchair rugby and wheelchair rugby league hold world cup competitions. A world cup competition is also held for physical disability rugby league.

== Rugby league ==
- Rugby League World Cup
- Women's Rugby League World Cup
- Wheelchair Rugby League World Cup
- The World Cup in physical disability rugby league
- Rugby League World Cup 9s

== Rugby union ==
- Rugby World Cup (Men)
- Rugby World Cup (Women)
- Rugby World Cup Sevens
- World Rugby Under 20 Championship

== Wheelchair rugby ==
- World Wheelchair Rugby Championships
