= Masters Rugby League =

Derivative of rugby league

- Highest governing body: Rugby League International Federation
- Nicknames: Masters, Football, Footy, League, Rugby
- First played: 1992, New Zealand

Characteristics
- Contact: Varied
- Team members: 17 (13 on field + 4 interchange)
- Mixed-sex: Single
- Type: Outdoor
- Equipment: Football
- Venue: Rugby league playing field

Masters Rugby League is a derivative of rugby league for a wide age range of older, semi-retired and non-competitive players and officials. Masters Rugby League started in Brisbane Australia (South East Queensland Masters Rugby League inc which is still played today) and New Zealand in 1992 and has since grown in popularity, spreading to Australia and more recently to the United Kingdom & Canada

== Rationale ==
The Masters of Rugby League New Zealand states, "Masters Rugby League is the game for a lifetime, for semi-retired players and officials". The Masters derivative of rugby league aimed to extend the playing, and officiating, life of people.

In 2008, in the United Kingdom the Rugby Football League (RFL) noted that there were only 2,000 registered club players aged 30 or over. This illustrates how the physical nature of competitive rugby league lends itself to being a young person's sport.

== History ==
Masters Rugby League started in New Zealand in 1992. Masters Rugby League in New Zealand has seen a growth in the number of teams since then as clubs became more aware of this grade. SPARC's Push Play campaign, promoting the benefits of physical activity has also had an impact.

Masters of Rugby League Australia Inc. was a spinoff from the International Masters Tournament that was held at the Western Weekender Stadium, home of St Mary's Rugby League Club in Sydney in October 2004. Malcolm Duncan and Graeme Killeen, both associated with the Penrith Junior League became the President and Secretary respectively. With assistance from St Marys Leagues, keen referees from Penrith and others, Masters Rugby League grew.

Masters of Rugby League Australia Inc. was established as a non-profit sporting organisation, with objectives increase access to the game for eligible participants and to promote the playing of rugby league in an environment of sportsmanship and goodwill.

== Eligibility ==
Participants must be aged over 35 and have retired from competitive rugby.

== Rule modifications ==
Rugby league's Laws of the Game apply except for amendments made by the governing bodies. There are slight differences between those adopted in New Zealand and the United Kingdom and the rules operated in Australia but the general modifications are the same and aim to reduce the physicality of the game, with "Rough and over vigorous play" not being condoned, and to reduce the amount of running, for example the defence must only retreat 5 metres at the play-the-ball and there is no running from dummy half.

Masters players are divided by age, this being signified through the use of different coloured shorts. Physical contact is restricted or removed in both attack and defence for individual players based on these colours. The younger players can tackle normally, if older players are involved in the tackle it may be completed by a two-handed hold or by a touch.
