= New Zealand physical disability national rugby league team =

New Zealand Physical Disability national rugby league team
Team information
- Nickname: Whaikaha Kiwis
- Governing body: RLIF
- Region: Asia-Pacific
- Head coach: Ray Greaves
- Captain: Mal Davis
- Most caps: Michael Kulene

Uniforms
First colours

Team results
- Biggest win
- New Zealand 26–0 England (Cabramatta, Australia; 2 November 2026)
- Biggest defeat
- New Zealand 2–50 England (Warrington, England; 28 October 2022)
- PDRL World Cup
- Appearances: 2 (first time in 2021)
- Best result: Runners-up, 2021, 2026

The New Zealand physical disability national rugby league team represents New Zealand in international physical disability rugby league (PDRL). The team has competed in international competitions including the 2018 Rugby League Commonwealth Championship, the 2018 Emerging Nations World Championship and the Physical Disability Rugby League World Cup.

New Zealand finished as runners-up at the inaugural 2021 Physical Disability Rugby League World Cup, held in England in 2022, losing 42–10 to England in the final. The team returned for the 2026 tournament in Australia, opening its campaign with a 26–0 victory over defending champions England before finishing as runners-up to Australia.

== History ==
=== Establishment and early international competition (2014–2019) ===
Efforts to establish physical disability rugby league in New Zealand began in 2014, leading to the formation of Physical Disability Rugby League New Zealand (PDRLNZ) in 2015. The organisation became an incorporated society in 2017.

In February 2018, New Zealand competed at the Rugby League Commonwealth Championships in Brisbane, Queensland, Australia. The team participated in a physical disability rugby league tournament against Australia and the Commonwealth All Stars, finishing with a silver medal.

In October 2018, New Zealand participated in the physical disability rugby league competition at the 2018 Emerging Nations World Championship in Sydney, New South Wales. The team was coached by Rodney Hall.

In 2019, PDRLNZ established the Campbell Cup, a domestic competition named in honour of Phil Campbell, a supporter of the organisation.

=== First home international (2024) ===
On 2 November 2024, New Zealand hosted Australia in its first home international physical disability rugby league match. The match was played at Go Media Stadium in Auckland, ahead of the New Zealand Kiwis' Pacific Championships match against Tonga.

New Zealand defeated Australia 20–18 to win the Trans-Tasman Challenge.

== World Cup campaigns ==
=== 2022 World Cup ===
New Zealand competed in the inaugural 2021 Physical Disability Rugby League World Cup, held in Warrington, England, from 23 to 30 October 2022. The tournament featured four nations: New Zealand, England, Australia and Wales. The group stage matches were played at Victoria Park, with the final held at Halliwell Jones Stadium.

New Zealand opened their campaign with a 28–26 defeat to Wales on 23 October, before defeating Australia 34–26 on 25 October. The team subsequently lost 50–2 to hosts England on 28 October. Despite the opening defeat, New Zealand advanced to the final after Wales was penalised for a breach of the tournament's player classification rules.

New Zealand faced England in the final at Halliwell Jones Stadium in Warrington on 30 October. England won 42–10, leaving New Zealand as runners-up in the inaugural tournament.

==== 2022 World Cup squad: ====
Head coach: Ray Greaves

1. Harley Roach
2. Garry Kingi
3. Jeremy Hendrix Harris
4. Max Walsh
5. Shane Culling
6. Timothy Ragg
7. Kent Stroobant
8. Jed Stone
9. Shane Ratahi
10. Mal Davis
11. Matthew Williams
12. Michael Kulene
13. Daley Manu
14. Che Fornusek
15. Philip Milne
16. Roko Nailolo
17. Matthew Slade
18. Delta Taeauga

=== 2026 World Cup ===
New Zealand competed in the 2026 Physical Disability Rugby League World Cup in Sydney, Australia, alongside hosts Australia and defending champions England. The tournament featured a three-team round-robin competition, with the top two teams advancing to the final at Allianz Stadium on 8 November.

New Zealand opened their campaign on 2 November with a 26–0 victory over England at AIIMS Stadium in Cabramatta. The victory marked a reversal of the result of the 2022 World Cup final, in which England had defeated New Zealand 42–10.

New Zealand subsequently lost 40–10 to Australia on 5 November before meeting Australia again in the final on 8 November, finishing as runners-up for the second consecutive tournament.

==== 2026 PDRL World Cup Squad: ====
- Head coach: Ray Greaves
- Assistant coach: Craig Wallace
1. Mal Davis (Auckland)
2. Sam Haira (Canterbury)
3. Che Fornusek (Thames)
4. Delta Taeauga (Canterbury)
5. Harley Roach (Canterbury)
6. Jack McSweeney (Waikato)
7. Jared Doughy (Counties Manukau)
8. Kayne Lloyd-Mooney (Hawke's Bay)
9. Keegan Pitcher (Auckland)
10. Kieran Lane (Auckland)
11. Matthew Williams (Manawatū)
12. Michael Kulene (Auckland)
13. Levi Shearer (Canterbury)
14. Mowhia Cook (Northland)
15. Philip Milne (Canterbury)
16. Roko Nailolo (Auckland)
17. Nikau Peipi (Marlborough)
18. Steven Beazley (Northland)
19. William Coman (Nelson)
20. Zac Tagomoa-Timo (Auckland)

== Results ==
Date	Opponent	Score	Tournament	Venue	Refs
23 February 2018	Commonwealth All Stars	4–0	2018 Commonwealth Championship	Dolphin Stadium, Brisbane	
24 February 2018	Australia	0–6	2018 Commonwealth Championship	Dolphin Stadium, Brisbane	
24 February 2018	Australia	0–0	2018 Commonwealth Championship	Dolphin Stadium, Brisbane	
24 February 2018	Commonwealth All Stars	0–0	2018 Commonwealth Championship	Dolphin Stadium, Brisbane	
24 February 2018	Australia	0–0 (Note: Final drawn: Australia won championship based on group standings)	2018 Commonwealth Championship	Dolphin Stadium, Brisbane	
9 October 2018	Australia	16–20	2018 ENWC Physical Disability Championship	Windsor Sporting Complex	
11 October 2018	Australia	16–10	2018 ENWC Physical Disability Championship	Windsor Sporting Complex	
13 October 2018	Australia	8–14	2018 ENWC Physical Disability Championship	St Marys Leagues Stadium	
23 October 2022	Wales	26–28 (Note: Wales won the match but due to a rules breach by Wales the match points were awarded to New Zealand)	2021 World Cup	Victoria Park, Warrington	
25 October 2022	Australia	34–26	2021 World Cup	Victoria Park, Warrington	
28 October 2022	England	2–50	2021 World Cup	Victoria Park, Warrington	
30 October 2022	England	10–42	2021 World Cup	Halliwell Jones Stadium, Warrington	
2 November 2024	Australia	20–18	Friendly	Mount Smart Stadium, Auckland	
2 November 2026	England	26–0	2026 World Cup	AIIMS Stadium, Cabramatta	
5 November 2026	Australia	10–40	2026 World Cup	AIIMS Stadium, Cabramatta	
8 November 2026	Australia	18–40	2026 World Cup	Allianz Stadium, Sydney	

=== Record by opponent ===
Opponent	Played	Won	Drawn	Lost	Win %
Australia	10	3	2	5	30.0%
England	3	1	0	2	33.3%
Wales	1	1	0	0	100.0%
(Commonwealth of Nations) Commonwealth All Stars	2	1	1	0	50.0%
Total	16	6	3	7	37.5%

NRL Fixtures

- Gold Coast at Robina Stadium on 6 September 2025. This match was a curtain raiser to a National Rugby League match between the Gold Coast Titans and Wests Tigers.
