= 2026 Rugby League World Cup =

Collection of world cups in rugby league

- Number of teams: 10 (men); 8 (women); 8 (wheelchair); 3 (physical disability)
- Host countries: Australia; New Zealand; Papua New Guinea
- Matches played: 53

The 2026 Rugby League World Cup (RLWC2026) was a collection of world cups in the sport of rugby league and was a replacement tournament for the 2025 Rugby League World Cup.

Like 2021, the 2026 World Cup saw the men's, women's, and wheelchair world cups held simultaneously. However unlike 2021, the men's tournament featured ten teams only, and the planned expansion of the women's and wheelchair tournament was delayed keeping team numbers at eight in each.

On 1 September 2026, the organisers announced that the second physical disability rugby league (PDRL) world cup would be held concurrently with the other three tournaments.

== Host selection ==
Originally due to be staged in the US and Canada in 2025, the offer was withdrawn due to financial concerns. In 2022, hosting was awarded to France. In May 2023, the French organisers pulled out of hosting the games.

On 3 August 2023, the 2025 tournaments were cancelled by the sport's governing body with the announcement that a new reduced-size tournament would take place in the southern hemisphere in 2026. On 24 July 2024, the IRL announced that Australia would host the 2026 tournament, with a number of games played in Papua New Guinea.

The announcement of the draw and pools on 23 November 2025 included the new stadium, Te Kaha, in Christchurch in the list of venues, adding New Zealand as a host country. Te Kaha is known as One New Zealand Stadium for sponsorship reasons and was opened in March 2026.

The Wollongong Entertainment Centre was selected as the venue for all matches in the Wheelchair World Cup.

All the PDRL group matches were played at the AIIMS Stadium in Cabramatta, with the final played at the Allianz Stadium in a triple header with the men's and women's semi-finals.

== Nations ==
14 nations qualified for the four tournaments:

- Australia (M, W, WC, PD)
- Cook Islands (M)
- England (M, W, WC, PD)
- Fiji (M, W)
- France (M, W, WC)
- Ireland (WC)
- Lebanon (M)
- New Zealand (M, W, WC, PD)
- Papua New Guinea (M, W)
- Samoa (M, W)
- Scotland (WC)
- Tonga (M)
- United States (WC)
- Wales (W, WC)

Note: M=Men's tournament, W=Women's tournament, WC=Wheelchair tournament, PD=Physical Disability tournament

== Venues ==
Twelve venues were selected.

Venues for the 2026 Rugby League World Cups
Host stadium for men's and women's tournaments
Host stadium for men's tournament
Host stadium for wheelchair tournament

Stadium			Location		Games			Game Days	Capacity
#	Original Name	Sponsored Name	City	Region	Women	Men	Total	Game Days	Capacity
Papua New Guinea (1)
1	PNG Football Stadium	Santos National Football Stadium	Port Moresby	NCD	2	2	4	2	14,800
New Zealand (1)
2	Te Kaha	One New Zealand Stadium	Christchurch	Canterbury	1	1	2	1	25,000
Australia (9)
3	Perth Rectangular Stadium	HBF Park	Perth	WA	2	2	4	2	20,500
4	Lang Park	Suncorp Stadium	Brisbane	QLD	1	2	3	2	52,500
5	North Queensland Stadium	Queensland Country Bank Stadium	Townsville	QLD	0	1	1	1	25,455
6	Robina Stadium	Cbus Super Stadium	Robina, Gold Coast	QLD	2	1	3	1	27,690
7	Newcastle International Sports Centre	McDonald Jones Stadium	Newcastle	NSW	2	2	4	2	33,000
8	Sydney Football Stadium	Allianz Stadium	Sydney	NSW	1	2	4 (Note: Includes the PDRL Final)	2	42,500
9	Western Sydney Stadium	CommBank Stadium	Parramatta, Sydney	NSW	3	4	7	3	30,000
10	Wollongong Showground	WIN Stadium	Wollongong	NSW	1	1	2	1	23,750
11	Wollongong Entertainment Centre	WIN Entertainment Centre	Wollongong	NSW	Wheelchair		20	8	6,000
12	Cabramatta Stadium	AIIMS Stadium	Cabramatta	NSW	PDRL		3	3	~2,000 (Note: Cabramatta Stadium has a small, five row grandstand on the western side of the playing field. Spectator areas on the other three sides of the field are standing at ground level.)

== Competitions ==
As with 2021, the men's, women's, wheelchair and physical disability rugby league world cups were held simultaneously in equal prominence.

=== Men ===
Pos	Team	Pld	W	D	L	PF	PA	PD	Pts	Qualification
1	Australia (H)	3	3	0	0	126	50	+76	6	Advance to knockout stage
2	New Zealand (H)	3	2	0	1	182	40	+142	4	Advance to knockout stage
3	Fiji	3	1	0	2	62	126	−64	2	
4	Cook Islands	3	0	0	3	34	188	−154	0	

Source: Source
Rules for classification: Pool stage tiebreakers
(H) Hosts

Pos	Pool	Team	Pld	W	D	L	PF	PA	PD	Pts	Qualification
1	C	Tonga	3	3	0	0	86	30	+56	6	Advance to knockout stage
2	B	Samoa	3	2	0	1	160	30	+130	4	Advance to knockout stage
3	B	England	3	2	0	1	128	42	+86	4	
4	C	Papua New Guinea (H)	3	1	0	2	60	116	−56	2	
5	B	Lebanon	3	1	0	2	42	98	−56	2	
6	C	France	3	0	0	3	24	184	−160	0	

Source: Source
Rules for classification: Pool stage tiebreakers
(H) Hosts

Semi-finals
7 November – Newcastle
New Zealand	34
Tonga	10
8 November – Sydney
Australia	44
Samoa	12

Final
15 November – Brisbane
Australia	32
New Zealand	12

=== Women ===
Pos	Team	Pld	W	D	L	PF	PA	PD	Pts	Qualification
1	Australia (H)	3	3	0	0	242	6	+236	6	Advance to knockout stage
2	Samoa	3	2	0	1	100	46	+54	4	Advance to knockout stage
3	England	3	1	0	2	76	108	−32	2	
4	Wales	3	0	0	3	12	270	−258	0	

Source: Source
(H) Hosts

Pos	Team	Pld	W	D	L	PF	PA	PD	Pts	Qualification
1	New Zealand (H)	3	3	0	0	150	24	+126	6	Advance to knockout stage
2	Fiji	3	2	0	1	106	28	+78	4	Advance to knockout stage
3	Papua New Guinea (H)	3	1	0	2	74	84	−10	2	
4	France	3	0	0	3	10	204	−194	0	

Source: Source
(H) Hosts

Semi-finals
7 November – Newcastle
New Zealand	32
Samoa	0
8 November – Sydney
Australia	30
Fiji	14

Final
15 November – Brisbane
Australia	34
New Zealand	10

=== Wheelchair ===
Pos	Team	Pld	W	D	L	PF	PA	PD	Pts	Qualification
1	England	3	3	0	0	300	50	+250	6	Advance to main semi-finals
2	Ireland	3	2	0	1	210	106	+104	4	Advance to main semi-finals
3	Wales	3	1	0	2	138	184	−46	2	Ranking semi-finals
4	United States	3	0	0	3	28	336	−308	0	Ranking semi-finals

Source: Source

Pos	Team	Pld	W	D	L	PF	PA	PD	Pts	Qualification
1	France	3	3	0	0	303	44	+259	6	Advance to main semi-finals
2	Australia (H)	3	2	0	1	240	107	+133	4	Advance to main semi-finals
3	Scotland	3	1	0	2	86	236	−150	2	Ranking semi-finals
4	New Zealand	3	0	0	3	42	284	−242	0	Ranking semi-finals

Source: Source
(H) Hosts

Ranking semi-finals
9 November – Wollongong
Scotland	44
United States	12
9 November – Wollongong
Wales	64
New Zealand	36

5th/6th play-off
12 November – Wollongong
Scotland	30
Wales	52
7th/8th play-off
12 November – Wollongong
United States	26
New Zealand	30

Semi-finals
10 November – Wollongong
France	82
Ireland	26
10 November – Wollongong
England	86
Australia	18

Final
13 November – Wollongong
France	38
England	50
Third place
13 November – Wollongong
Ireland	24
Australia	70

=== Physical disability ===
Pos	Team	Pld	W	D	L	PF	PA	PD	Pts	Qualification
1	Australia (H)	2	2	0	0	60	22	+38	4	Advance to Final
2	New Zealand	2	1	0	1	36	40	−4	2	Advance to Final
3	England	2	0	0	2	12	46	−34	0	

First match(es) will be played: 30 October 2026. Source:
(H) Hosts

Group Stage 1
30 October – Cabramatta
Australia	20
England	12

Group Stage 2
2 November – Cabramatta
England	0
New Zealand	26

Group Stage 3
5 November – Cabramatta
Australia	40
New Zealand	10

Final
8 November – Sydney - 4:15PM (AEDT)
Australia	42
New Zealand	18

At the conclusion of the Final, Bryce Crane (Australia), who had scored four tries, was announced as Player of the Match.

== Scheduling ==
Collectively, matches were scheduled at eleven venues in nine cities. The Sydney Football Stadium in Moore Park and Western Sydney Stadium in Parramatta are the two venues used in Greater Sydney.

The other city to supply two venues is Wollongong, where the adjacent venues Wollongong Entertainment Centre and Wollongong Showground was used. The former was used for all wheelchair matches. Immediately following on from the opening pair of wheelchair matches, the latter hosted a women's match and then a men's match.

The majority of matches were scheduled in multiple match game day formats. There were just three stand-alone matches. All three involved the Australian men's team.

Schedule of matches (Note: The four timeslots are based on the start time on the east coast of Australia)
Date	Early Afternoon			Mid Afternoon			Late Afternoon			Evening/Night			Venue
15 Oct		—			—			—		Australia	M	New Zealand	Sydney
16 Oct		—			—		Samoa	M	France	Australia	W	Samoa	Parramatta
17 Oct	Papua New Guinea	W	France	Papua New Guinea	M	Lebanon		—			—		Port Moresby
17 Oct		—			—		England	W	Wales	England	M	Tonga	Perth
18 Oct		—		New Zealand	W	Fiji	Fiji	M	Cook Islands		—		Newcastle
23 Oct		—			—		Samoa	W	Wales	Tonga	M	Lebanon	Parramatta
24 Oct	Papua New Guinea	W	Fiji	Papua New Guinea	M	Samoa		—			—		Port Moresby
24 Oct		—			—		England	M	France	Australia	W	England	Perth
25 Oct		—			—		New Zealand	W	France	New Zealand	M	Cook Islands	Christchurch
25 Oct		—			—			—		Australia	M	Fiji	Brisbane
30 Oct		—			—			—		Australia	PD	England	Cabramatta
30 Oct	Ireland	WC	United States	England	WC	Wales	England	W	Samoa	England	M	Papua New Guinea	Wollongong
31 Oct		—		Fiji	W	France	New Zealand	M	Fiji	New Zealand	W	Papua New Guinea	Gold Coast
31 Oct		—			—		France	WC	Scotland	Australia	WC	New Zealand	Wollongong
31 Oct		—			—			—		Australia	M	Cook Islands	Townsville
1 Nov		—		Australia	W	Wales	Lebanon	M	France	Tonga	M	Samoa	Parramatta
2 Nov		—			—			—		England	PD	New Zealand	Cabramatta
3 Nov	France	WC	New Zealand	Australia	WC	Scotland	Ireland	WC	Wales	England	WC	United States	Wollongong
5 Nov		—			—			—		Australia	PD	New Zealand	Cabramatta
6 Nov	Scotland	WC	New Zealand	Wales	WC	United States	England	WC	Ireland	Australia	WC	France	Wollongong
7 Nov		—			—		Pool B 1st	W	2nd Pool A	Pool B+C 1st	M	2nd Pool A	Newcastle
8 Nov		—		the	PD	Final	Pool A 1st	W	2nd Pool B	Pool A 1st	M	2nd Pool B+C	Sydney
9 Nov	Pool B 3rd	WC	4th Pool A	Pool A 3rd	WC	4th Pool B		—			—		Wollongong
10 Nov		—			—		Pool B 1st	WC	2nd Pool A	Pool A 1st	WC	2nd Pool B	Wollongong
12 Nov	7th place	WC	Play-off	5th place	WC	Play-off		—			—		Wollongong
13 Nov		—			—		3rd place	WC	Play-off	the	WC	Final	Wollongong
15 Nov		—			—		the	W	Final	the	M	Final	Brisbane

== Broadcasting ==
In Australia, Seven Network won rights to the tournament in a $12 million deal. The deal was confirmed on 22 October 2025.

In the UK, the BBC refused to bid for the tournament's TV rights. Following the announcement of Premier Sports as the TV broadcaster for viewers in UK and Ireland, Secretary of State for Digital, Culture, Media and Sport Lisa Nandy urged the IRL to strike a deal with a free-to-air broadcaster.

The full broadcasting list was confirmed the day before the tournament.

Region	Broadcaster	Free-to-Air/ Subscription	Details
Australia	Seven Network	Free-to-Air	All men's, women's, and wheelchair matches live.
New Zealand	Sky Sport	Subscription	All men's, women's, and wheelchair matches live.
Canada	Premier Sports Americas	Subscription	All men's matches live and select women's and wheelchair matches live.
Japan; Hong Kong; Macau; Mongolia; South Korea; Taiwan; Afghanistan; Vietnam; Timor-Leste; Thailand; Singapore; Philippines; Myanmar; Malaysia; Laos; Indonesia; Cambodia; Brunei; Bangladesh; Bhutan; India; Maldives; Nepal; Pakistan; Sri Lanka	Premier Sports Asia	Subscription	All men's matches live and select women's and wheelchair matches live.
Fiji	Fijian Broadcasting Corporation	Free-to-Air	
Tonga	Tonga Broadcasting Commission	Free-to-Air	
Cook Islands; Federated States of Micronesia; Kiribati; New Caledonia; Nauru; Niue; Palau; Samoa; Solomon Islands; Tuvalu; Vanuatu; American Samoa	Pasifika TV	Free-to-Air	
United Kingdom and Ireland	Premier Sports (Note: Premier Sports will broadcast Australia's Channel 7 coverage for the majority of games, only providing their own studio coverage for England matches.)	Subscription	All men's matches live, all England women's and wheelchair matches live, and women's and wheelchair semi-finals and final live.
United Kingdom and Ireland	BBC	Free-to-Air	Live radio coverage and television highlights via BBC iPlayer, and wheelchair final live
Austria; Germany; Switzerland	SportdigitalTV	Subscription	
Bahrain; Iraq; Jordan; Kuwait; Lebanon; Oman; Palestine; Qatar; Saudi Arabia; Syria; United Arab Emirates; Yemen; Algeria; Djibouti; Egypt; Libya; Mauritania; Morocco; Somalia; Sudan; Tunisia	Dubai TV	Free-to-Air	

In countries where the broadcasting rights have not been sold, the tournament was streamed online by Premier Sports with a dedicated subscription.

== See also ==
- 2026 Rugby League World Cup (disambiguation)
