= 2026 Rugby League World Cup (disambiguation) =

The 2026 Rugby League World Cup is a collection of world cups in the sport of rugby league being held in Australia from 15 October 2026 to 15 November 2026 including:

- 2026 Men's Rugby League World Cup, the 16th staging of the Men's competition
- 2026 Women's Rugby League World Cup, the 6th staging of the Women's competition
- 2026 Wheelchair Rugby League World Cup, the 4th staging of the Wheelchair competition
- 2026 Physical Disability Rugby League World Cup, the 2nd staging of the Physical Disability competition

== See also ==
- 2026 Rugby League World Cup final (disambiguation)
- 2026 Rugby League World Cup group stage (disambiguation)
- 2026 Rugby League World Cup knockout stage (disambiguation)
- 2026 Rugby League World Cup qualification (disambiguation)
- 2026 Rugby League World Cup squads (disambiguation)
- World cup of rugby (disambiguation)
- Rugby (disambiguation)
