= Physical disability rugby league =

Modified version of rugby

Physical disability rugby league is a modified version of rugby league football catered to suit people of various physical disabilities.

== History ==
Physical disability rugby league was created by the NSW Physical Disability Rugby League and founded by George Tonna in 2010.

The PDRLNZ of New Zealand was founded in 2015.

The first international PDRL matches were played in 2018. Australia, New Zealand, and the Commonwealth All Stars competed as part of the 2018 Commonwealth Games exhibition tournament in February 2018. Australia and New Zealand played a three-match series in October 2018, alongside the 2018 Emerging Nations Tournament.

PDRL was first played in England in February 2018 with a match between the Warrington Wolves and the Leeds Rhinos, the latter winning 22–10. In August 2018, Warrington defeated the South Sydney Rabbitohs 34–12 at ANZ Stadium in Sydney. In 2019, a 6-team tournament was established in England, which Warrington won.

The inaugural PDRL World Cup took place in Warrington from 23 to 30 October 2022 as a showpiece event alongside the 2021 Rugby League World Cup, and consisted of squads from Australia, England, New Zealand, and Wales, with the team from England proving victorious. Comedian Adam Hills took part of Australia's squad for the tournament, as well as being a spokesperson for the event.

== Rule variations ==
Physical disability rugby league is played with the following variations from the standard laws of rugby league, according to the NSW Physical Disability Rugby League:

- Each match consists of two 20-minute halves
- Each team consists of 9 players
- Scrums are replaced by play-the-ball change-overs
- Players wear either black or red shorts, depending on their physical disability
- Red short players play touch football rules when "tackling" or being "tackled"
- Black short players play with full-contact
- 2 players without physical disabilities are permitted per team, but can not score tries, kick goals, or kick in general play
- Offside works in a similar way to normal rugby league gameplay
- Teams are open to male and female players

=== World Cup rules ===
The rules used during the 2021 World Cup differed from those given above.

- Each match had two 25-minute halves.
- Each team had 11 players.
- Players underwent a classification process and wore coloured socks based on their level of impairment. Players were classified as A (purple), B (pink) or C (blue) based on factors such as impaired muscle power and limb deficiency and teams were restricted in the number of on-field players in each of these classes with a maximum of three A's and a minimum of three C's. The socks were in addition to the wearing of red shorts to signify players who could not be tackled.
