= Rugby league in Solomon Islands =

Solomon Islands

Team information
- Nickname: Solies
- Governing body: Solomon Islands Rugby League Federation
- Region: Oceania
- Head coach: "Matt" and "Graeme" (RAMSI Officers)
- Home stadium: Town Ground, Honiara
- First game
- Solomon Islands vs. New South Wales Police Force (November 2010)

The Solomon Islands national rugby league team represents Solomon Islands in the sport of rugby league football. They are, in fact, planning a top-level tournament in 2010–11, after the capital of Honiara hosts an inter-city exhibition league, the Honiara Rugby League; expected in August 2009 but now it seems early 2010 will be the most convenient point for when it will be held after an uphold in the delivery of the participating teams jerseys caused delays. They are an unaffiliated nation and were recognised by the RLIF as having official observer status in early 2009. They are scheduled to participate in their first-ever test match against a touring New South Wales Police Team in November 2010.

== Early development (1999–2000) ==
In 1999, the Solomon Islands Rugby League Federation started the game on the Islands to provide youngsters and a wider range of people with interest in the game an optional game to rugby union. The Papua New Guinea Rugby Football League aided Solomon Islands by sending their more experienced officials to oversee the development of the game in its early, less popular stage. The RLIF also sent out officials to Solomon Islands, but as Solomon Islands were not members of the RLIF in these early years and were not playing or organising the game in any official format, they were sent out as observatory officials, as opposed to the development officers that are in place now. These officials conducted the incursion of the game by advertising the excitement and enjoyability of the game to youngsters. However, with political disputes and with the Papua New Guinea Rugby Football League removing their support for the game on the Islands, the game failed to advance any further and its observation ceased.

== Re-introduction (2008) and onward development ==
=== 2008 ===
For the best part of 10 years, the game in Solomon Islands was virtually completely frozen. However, in 2008, the RLIF offered the Island a re-building programme to restart the game at both grass-roots levels in schools and by means of Sunday leagues, and at open age, with the SIRLF planning a league in Honiara (later to be confirmed to be known as the Honiara Rugby League). In 2008, it was announced that there would be a competition in Solomon Islands, to immediately initiate a desire to participate and win in the game. The Honiara Rugby League Association was founded in 2008 in order for the game in the city to be spread independently, whilst the SIRLF concentrated on the rest of the Solomon Islands. An Australian sports management business, Global League Management, who specifically aid developing rugby league nations offered to provide assistance to Solomon Islands. Global League Management's Chairman, Dane Campbell (himself a former half-back with Newcastle Knights) said: "I’m hopeful to be able to put into contact with the Solomon Islands rugby league to offer our assistance to them in their development process." It was also anticipated that the SIRLF (Solomon Islands Rugby League Federation) will again strike a partnership with the game in Papua New Guinea in 2008 to aid development of the game in both nations, but particularly in Solomon Islands. It is also anticipated that SIRLF will form a collaboration with the Solomon Islands Rugby Union (SIRU) to develop the game further. These developments also led to a planned bid to join the RLIF.

=== 2009 ===
In February 2009, the RLIF said that it would pay particular attention to how well the game was developing on the Islands, and said that it would go about this by sending equipment, advisers and development officers later in the year. RAMSI officers, known as "Matt" and "Graeme", agreed to coach both the Honiara sides in the Islands' maiden game, the inter-city Honiara tournament and the tour match against New South Wales Police. It was also confirmed in February that the RLIF would send people from the Rugby League Academy of Australia in order to support the games' development. President of the SIRLF William Tuhaika said of this agreement: "They are sending sports equipments and development resources manuals. The RLIF also pledges to send two educators and instructors to conduct the proposed development course (coaching/refereeing)." In June 2009, also, there was a refereeing course on the Islands to provide people with the opportunity to learn about what it takes to become a first-grade official. It was compromised by teachers and amateur club representatives and was conducted by Peter Corcoran – New South Wales Rugby League educational director and an AFP (Australian Federal Police) officer. The first ever game on the Islands was played in June 2009 when a combined Eastern and Central Honiara took on West Honiara. This was to evaluate a side for the exhibition game to take place in November to play the New South Wales Police Force. Tuhaika said of this test match: "At least two technical people from Australian Rugby League will come over to help prepare the national side for this proposed historic event." A new stadium was built in 2009, specifically for rugby, and will act as home for both codes of rugby in the Islands.

=== 2010 ===
The test match against the touring New South Wales Police team, has been scheduled for November 2010. The game is likely to be played at the new, dual-code "Town Ground" stadium in Honiara. This is in addition to the delayed Honiara competition, the HRL which will act as a selection league for this game. There will also be a junior rugby league competition in Honiara, coinciding with the open-age tournament. The game is also looking to reach out to the women of the Islands to play and hope that a tag tournament can be formed in 2010. The Pacific regional associate of the Rugby League International Federation, the Pacific Islands Rugby League Federation was formed in 2010, with the aim of aiding developing "Pacific Rim" nations such as Solomon Islands via the other, more developed Pacific nations, such as New Zealand and Papua New Guinea.

== Governing body ==
The Solomon Islands Rugby League Federation are the governing body for rugby league in Solomon Islands. Officially founded in 2008 after being an unofficial body from 1999, they conduct the incursion of the game in Solomon Islands on behalf of the RLIF, and aid the sports development with the distribution of money, equipment and development officers sent by the RLIF. They are part of the Pacific Islands Rugby League Federation, and affiliate members of the Rugby League International Federation.

== Media efforts ==
Efforts have made to spread the game by televising rugby league with the availability of both the NRL, including its grand final, with most recently the 2009 NRL Grand Final being streamed to the Solomon Islands; and State of Origin via free-to-view television. The World Cup of 2008 also was a way to induce popularity in the game as that too was a chance to see not only international-class rugby, but to influence how far the game has spread, with the involvement of nations such as Ireland and Fiji – as well as Papua New Guinea who offered their support to the Island during their initial development period. The game is also widespread via newspapers such as The Solomon Star and The Solomon Times which feature results from Australia (i.e. NRL, Queensland and New South Wales Cups and the National Youth Competition where Solomon players play sparingly), financial and sporting development nationally and individual successes from the Islands; such as Gerard Tema who was selected to play for Brisbane in early 2009.

== Competitions ==
It has been anticipated that within the next few years of development that Solomon Islands would be in a position to launch a bid to participate in the World Cup. Rugby League International Federation Development Officer and ex-Penrith, Canterbury-Bankstown and Paris Châtillon XIII player Tas Baitieri said: "Other Pacific Islands countries played rugby league for 14 years before making it to the World Cup. Being familiar with the rugby league by watching other countries playing the code, Solomon Islands can pick up and make it in less than 14 years." The SIRLF had announced that they would select players to compete in the Cook Islands 7s in 2009. However, the competition that included teams from across the Pacific Nations did not feature a Solomon Islands team. This is in addition to the inter-city tournament, the Honiara Rugby League (HRL) – which will feature 4 amateur teams and players from across Honiara. There will be two teams from the West and one each from the East and Central areas. SIRLF President William Tuhaika said that the purpose of the competition is to give players competitive opportunity to adjust to the new code of rugby on the Islands. He also stated that the league was to make up a national side to play the NSW Police side in October. There are already 60 players signed up to play in this competition for any one of the four sides with more anticipated as registration is still available. However, due to a hold-up in the jerseys being shipped in, from Australia on behalf of the ARL, the tournament looks like it will be delayed shortly. It is said that this will be a platform towards the 2010 tournament that the SIRLF hope will be a national event featuring interested amateur sides from across the Islands. It has also been announced that Tuhaika will attempt to place a bid for Solomon Islands to take part in the Pacific Cup in the near future.

=== Mini Pacific Sevens issue (2009) ===
The SIRLF had announced their 24-man squad to compete in the Mini Pacific Sevens; held in the Cook Islands in September 2009. However, they were excluded from the tournament for a reason based on the qualification guidelines and criteria. It is presumed that the standard of rugby in Solomon Islands was not experienced, or simply not good enough, to be included in the games. It is possible that if the local competition had been operational then the tournament would have seen a team from Solomon Islands. The query was made by the main organiser of the tournament who requested to the administration of National Olympic Committee of Solomon Islands (NOCSI) that the decision be reversed. However, there was no response and the games were played without Solomon Islands.

=== Honiara Rugby League (HRL) results ===
The HRL is Solomon Islands' maiden rugby league tournament and is scheduled to take place in 2010.

Results from the upcoming HRL tournament will appear here as and when they are available.

== Players ==
=== Squad ===
Solomon Islands national rugby league team squad
First team squad		Coaching staff
1 – FB; 2 Jack Asyemba – WG; 3 – CE; 4 – CE; 5 Dean Tass – WG; 6 – SO; 7 Luke Fatnowa – SH; 8 Gerard Tema – PR; 9 – HK; 10 Steve Driscoll – PR; 11 – SR; 12 – SR; 13 Will Naitoro – LF, HK	14; 15; 16; 17	Legend: (c) Captain(s); (vc) Vice-captain(s)

=== Notable players ===
The following is a list of players with Solomon Islands family heritage who are past or present professional or semi-professional players:

Name	Position	Junior Club(s)	Senior Club(s)	Notable Competition(s)	Representative Team	National Honours	Sources
Jack Asyemba	Wing		Canberra Juniors, Canberra U18s	Harold Matthews Cup, S. G. Ball Cup		Shane Purtell	Canberra Raiders Juniors Harold matthews Cup, S.G ball Gold Coast U/19 REP side Qld origin U/17
Jardine Bobongie	Back-Row/Utility	Mackay Souths	Cronulla, Cronulla U20s, South Sydney, North Sydney, St George, Mackay	NRL, (Jersey Flegg) Toyota Cup, NSW Cup, QLD Cup			
Steve Driscoll	Prop/Second-Row		South Sydney U20s, Leigh, Sydney, Sydney U20s (both as strength and conditioning coach)	Jersey Flegg Cup, National League 1, Challenge Cup, NRL, Toyota Cup (as part of coaching staff)		Australian Fijians (assistant coach)	
Luke "Fatz" Fatnowa	Stand Off/Prop		Sydney, Sydney U20s, North Sydney, Central QLD, Mackay	NRL, (Jersey Flegg) Toyota Cup, NSW Cup, QLD Cup	Queensland U19s		
Mal Meninga	Centre	Wide Bay	Brisbane Souths, St. Helens, Canberra, Canberra (head coach)	QLD Cup, BRL, English Premiership, Challenge Cup, NSWRL, NRL, World Cup, State of Origin	Queensland U18s, Queensland, Queensland (head coach)	Australia	
Will Naitoro	Lock/Hooker	Tuggeranong Valley	Canberra U20s, Melbourne U20s, Melbourne	(Jersey Flegg) Toyota Cup, NRL	ACT U15s, Victoria U18s	Combined Affiliated Schools U18s	
Frank-Paul Nu'uausala	Prop/Second-row	Mangere East	New Zealand Warriors U18s, New Zealand Warriors U20s, Sydney Roosters	(Jersey Flegg) Toyota Cup, NRL		New Zealand	
Dominique Peyroux	Centre/Winger/Lock	Matraville Sports High School	Sydney, Sydney U20s, Newtown, Gold Coast U20s, Gold Coast, Tweed Heads	AAC National Champions Trophy, (Jersey Flegg) Toyota Cup, NSW Cup, NRL, QLD Cup, Pacific Cup		Cook Islands	
Dean Tass	Wing/Centre		Norths Mackay, Mackay	MDRL, QLD Cup			
Gerard Ianni "G" Tema	Prop	Gladstone Past Brothers	Central Capras U17s & 18s, Gladstone, Brisbane U20s, Redcliffe	Gladstone and District Rugby League, QRL Aged Carnival, Central QLD Challenge, QRL Central Div. Extended A-Grade, Toyota Cup, QLD Cup, FOGS Cup	Central Queensland; Juniors		

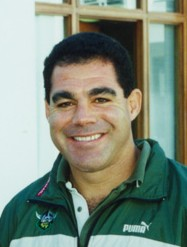
Mal Meninga is arguably the most notable Solomon Islands footballer.

== SIRLF 1st meeting ==
On 10 November 2008 the Solomon Islands Rugby League Federation was officially founded at a meeting at the Environmental Conference room, Honiara. This meeting was also a joint meeting with the Honiara Rugby league Association, and the purpose of their inclusion in the meeting was to initiate their independence in developing the game in the city whilst also finalising the details for the exhibition game between East and Central Honiara and West Honiara.

These are the seven officials that were chosen at the meeting on 10 November 2008 to be in the Solomon Islands Rugby League Federation:

- Chairman – William Tuhaika
- Vice-chair – Nolan Teika
- Secretary – Silverio Lepe
- Treasurer – Dr. Cedric Alependava
- Member – Robert Dofe
- Member – Derrick Kama
- Member – Ken Woollett

=== Honiara Rugby League Association officials ===
The HRLA comprises representatives form Honiara and Solomon Islands, but also Australia, Tonga and Papua New Guinea; areas from which Solomon Islands will be aided:

- Golden Kiloko
- Joseph Nelson
- Derick Kama
- Martin (Papua New Guinean representative)
- Sika (Tongan representative)
- Ronanzki (Australian representative)

== Sponsorship possibilities ==
The Solomon Islands Rugby League Federation are currently looking for sponsorship for the game in the country. They also need sponsors for both the HRL and the test match against New South Wales Police. The last time the game was initiated in the Solomon Islands, in 1999, Republic of China, Kossol Car Rental and BP Investments were major supporters of the developments and have, despite the failures of last time's development, expressed an interest to back the game once more.

== See also ==
- Solomon Islands Rugby League Federation
- Solomon Islands national rugby league team
