= Rugby league in Papua New Guinea =

- Country: Papua New Guinea
- Governing body: Papua New Guinea National Rugby League
- National team: Papua New Guinea
- Nickname: the Kumuls
- First played: 1930s
- Registered players: 15,000 (total); 10,000 (adult), 5,000 (junior)
- Clubs: 280

National competitions
- Rugby League World Cup Four Nations

Club competitions
- Papua New Guinea National Rugby League; Digicel Cup

Audience records
- Single match: 20,000+ 2010 Goroka Lahanis v Mendi Muruks 21–10

Rugby league is the most popular sport in Papua New Guinea and the country's national sport. Papua New Guineans have a reputation as being some of the world's most passionate rugby league supporters.

== History ==
Papua New Guinea first came into contact with rugby league during the gold rush in the 1930s through Australian miners. Australian soldiers stationed in the country during and after the Second World War reintroduced the sport and in 1949 and the Papua New Guinea Rugby Football League was founded. It quickly became a popular spectator sport.

During the 1960s rugby league grew to be the clear national sport of the country. Despite being the most popular spectator sport, rugby league was mainly played by Australians and New Zealanders at this time. Participation numbers did not grow to reflect spectator numbers for another decade.

The governing body for rugby league in Papua New Guinea became members of the Rugby League International Federation in 1974 and the national team's first ever Test match was a 40–12 home defeat by Great Britain a year later. They first competed in the Rugby League World Cup in the 1985–89 competition.

A record attendance was established at the Papua New Guinea Grand Final held at the Morobean capital on 8 September 2010. When the Goroka Lahanis defeated the Mendi Muruks 21–10 in front of a crowd that was believed to be 20,000+

The PNG Hunters professional rugby league football club formed in 2013 to compete in the Queensland Rugby League's Intrust Super Cup. The Hunters won the Intrust Super Cup in 2017.

In October 2015, Papua New Guinea sealed a deal to co-host the 2017 Rugby League World Cup along with Australia and New Zealand. The Kumuls were given their 'own pool' hosting both their Group C fixtures against Wales and Ireland, plus an 'inter-group' match against USA of Group D, in Port Moresby.

== Governing body ==
The Papua New Guinea Rugby Football League are the governing body for rugby league in Papua New Guinea. They have been members of the Rugby League International Federation and Pacific Islands Rugby League Federation.

== Domestic competitions ==
1990 saw the launch of a national competition then called the SP Inter-City Cup or SP Cup (1990–2008) and later the Bemobile Cup (2009–2010) after changes in sponsorship. The current competition is sponsored by pacific telecommunications giant Digicel and is now known as the Digicel Cup. The current competition is made up of 12 teams from various cities or provinces around the country. The competition follows the conventional Australian NRL format, with 26 round robin games followed by the top 4 teams entering the finals play-offs.

Below the Digicel Cup exist many local and provincial competitions, the most prestigious of which is the Port Moresby League. In 2007 a new league called the Nokondi Cup was created for teams in the Eastern Highlands province.

A Port Moresby team (the Port Moresby Vipers) competed in the Panasonic Cup in 1986, 1987, 1988 and 1989; and in the Queensland Cup in 1996 and 1997. The 2014 season saw the PNG Hunters enter the Queensland Cup, based out of Kokopo.

== NRL team bid ==
An official bid for a PNG team in the National Rugby League (Australia's primary rugby league competition) began in October 2008. The bid was launched by Sir Michael Somare. In 2021, Prime Minister James Marape supported the bid, stating his country wanted an NRL team by 2025. Many have also suggested the addition of one NRL team for both Papua New Guinea and the city of Cairns in Far North Queensland.

On 19 February 2025 a formal agreement was reached for a Papua New Guinea-based team to enter the competition in 2028. It was also agreed this would be funded by Australia, which would provide AU$600 million. The agreement by Australia is an example of sports diplomacy, aiming to shore up Australia–Papua New Guinea relations at a time when relations with China are growing. The team was named the Papua New Guinea Chiefs in October 2025.

== Notable players ==
Many Papua New Guineans have gone on to play professional rugby league either in the National Rugby League in Australia or Super League in Europe. It is the goal of the PNGRL to have 120 players participating in the NRL and Super League by 2010.

- Adrian Lam
- Neville Costigan
- John Wilshere
- Paul Aiton
- Arnold Krewanty
- Menzie Yere
- David Mead
- Marcus Bai
- Elias Paiyo
- Stanley Gene
- Makali Aizue
- Rhyse Martin
- James Segeyaro
- Nene McDonald
- Justin Olam
- Kato Ottio
- Kurt Baptiste
- Rod Griffin
- Ray Thompson
- Xavier Coates

== Popularity ==
Rugby league is the most popular sport in Papua New Guinea and is commonly referred to as the national sport. In a nation where communities are far apart and many people live at a minimal subsistence level, rugby league is the lifeblood of the country and is considered a matter of life and death.

During the 2000 Rugby League World Cup an estimated audience of 2 million watched the Kumuls lose to the Welsh Dragons in the quarter-finals in the early hours of the morning local time. Despite this loss over 50,000 fans welcomed the team at Port Moresby Airport later that week.

The annual match between the Kumuls and the Australian Prime Minister's XIII is attended by spectators.

== Participation ==
Rugby league has a huge participation rate in the junior level with every school in the country involved in a rugby league competition as rugby league is part of the school curriculum. There are 5,000 registered players between the ages of 12 and 18.

There are 10,000 registered senior players. They compete in 63 affiliated leagues around the country. Each league has a minimum of seven clubs and each club has four teams.

== National teams ==
=== Men ===
The Papua New Guinea men's national rugby league team are nicknamed Kumuls after the bird-of-paradise, a national symbol of the country. Their first ever Test match was a 40–12 home defeat by England in 1975.

They compete in the Rugby League World Cup and first entered a team in the 1985–89 competition, though it was not until the 1995 Rugby League World Cup that they were able to win away from home.

The Papua New Guinea national rugby league team usually play against an Australian national rugby league team (The Prime Minister's XIII made up of players in teams that have not qualified for the National Rugby League Final Series) each year in Port Moresby. It is such a popular fixture that thousands of people can't get into the ground once it's full, causing people to climb onto the stadium roof or up trees outside the ground in order to see the match. The limited capacity of the stadium for this fixture often sparks riots. Spectators clashed with riot police during this fixture in 2006.

=== Women ===
The Papua New Guines women's national rugby league team are nicknamed Orchids. The name was chosen as a symbol of diversity; there are over 3,000 species of Orchid in Papua New Guinea. They competed in the Women's Rugby League World Cup for the first time at the 2017 competition. At the 2021 World Cup they won their opening match against Canada.

== See also ==
- Sport in Papua New Guinea
