= Cook Islands Rugby League Association =

Sports governing body in the Cook Islands

- Founded: 1962
- IRL affiliation: 1962 (Test nation)
- APRL affiliation: 2010 (full; founder)
- Responsibility: Cook Islands
- Men's coach: Karmichael Hunt
- Women's coach: Anthony ("Rusty") Matua

(Cook Islands)
- As of 1 July 2009

The Cook Islands Rugby League Association are the governing body for rugby league in Cook Islands. They are based in the capital Rarotonga.

== History ==
They were founded in 1949. The Association have been members of the Rugby League International Federation since 1974.

Along with the governing bodies of Tonga, Samoa, Fiji and the Cook Islands, they founded the Asia-Pacific Rugby League Confederation in December 2009.

== National teams ==
- Cook Islands national rugby league team
- Cook Islands women's national rugby league team

== See also ==
- Rugby league in the Cook Islands
- Cook Islands Round Cup
