= Rachel Ankomah =

Ghanaian rugby league personality (born 1993)

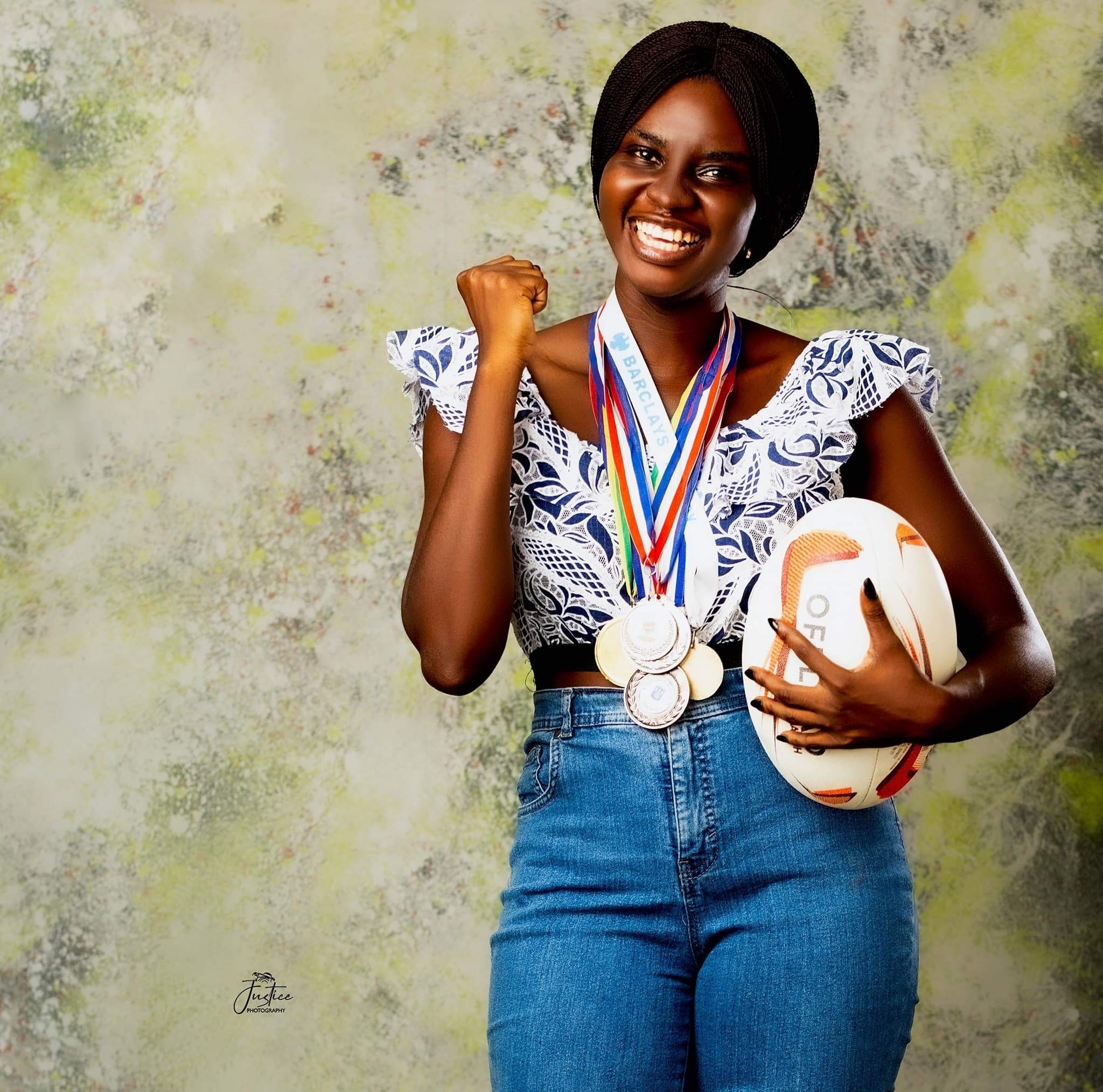
- Ankomah in 2021
- Born: December 28, 1993 (age 31); Accra, Ghana
- Education: University of Ghana (BS)
- Occupation(s): Sports Development Officer and Coach
- Years active: 2021 - present
- Known for: Rugby League
- Awards: 40 Under 40 award in the sports category, Youth Sports Personality of the Year, Women in Sports Association (WISA) Awardee

Rachel Ankomah (born December 28, 1993) is the founder of Accra Majestics Sports Academy, a Ghanaian rugby coach and advocate for women's sports. She’s is also the Director of Corporate communications for Ghana Rugby Association. She was the first women's rugby league coordinator in Ghana and a pioneer for the sport in Ghana.

== Early life ==
Ankomah is an alumna of Achimota Senior High School and University of Ghana, Legon. She started sports at a very young age. Her first competitive sport was triple jump in Junior High School.

She continued with the sport in Senior High School while proceeding with participating in soccer, hockey, basketball, handball, cricket and javelin. She was a member of the team that represented Achimota School in the games in Nigeria in 2011 and 2013. She became the captain of the Achimota Hockey School Team in 2012.

In university, she was part of the team that represented University of Ghana at the GUSA games in 2014 and 2016, taking the first position and second position respectively in the hockey competitions.

In 2016, she became the team manager for Warriors Volleyball club. In 2017, she became the team manager for Titans Sporting Club- Rugby.

== Career and achievements ==
In 2017, Ankomah commenced her tenure at First Insurance Company Ltd, serving initially as National Service Personnel before advancing to the role of Assistant Executive Officer in 2019. That same year marked her appointment as the team manager for the Ghana Skolars Rugby League Club, a position in which she excelled, earning the distinction of best team manager in February 2020. Her efforts were also internationally acknowledged when she was honoured as a Rugby League hero by the International Rugby League in 2020.

Ankomah became the women's coordinator for Rugby League Federation Ghana in June 2020. She was in charge of the development of the women's division. Her leadership marked the beginning of a new era for the women's division, focusing on growth and development. The 'Pretty Girls Play Rugby League' campaign, launched under her guidance, aimed to dismantle stereotypes and promote inclusivity in sports. This initiative, along with the establishment of five women's teams, the WeEmpower Campaign, and programs for breast cancer awareness and bias breaking, represents a progressive step towards gender equality in sports within Ghana.

Ankomah earned the distinction of being selected to be part of the Middle East and Africa Women's Working Group. This committee was tasked with overseeing the progression of women's rugby league within these territories. Additionally, Ankomah was appointed as a representative for this group at the International Rugby League's Women and Girls Advisory group, further highlighting her involvement in the sport's international development.

In February 2021, Ankomah stepped down from her role as team manager of the Ghana Skolars Rugby League Club, followed by her resignation as women's coordinator in March 2021. Subsequently, on July 10, 2021, she established the Accra Majestics Rugby League Club, becoming the first woman to own a rugby league club in Ghana.

Flexi Africa also named her as an influencer for their company in 2022.

Currently, she works as a Sports Development Officer for the National Sports Authority and also as the Municipal Sports Director of the Krowor Municipal Assembly.

Ankomah's career highlights include a feature on the "Chasing Kangaroo" podcast episode titled "Chasing Jillaroos," as well as significant interviews with notable media outlets. An interview with Rodney Hinds for "The Voice" Online is particularly noteworthy, discussing community experiences a year after the first lockdown. Additionally, Ankomah was interviewed by "Change in Africa Magazine," further establishing their influence and reach.

== Awards ==
In 2021, Ankomah was honoured with the Youth Sports Personality of the Year Award. The following year, she continued to garner recognition, securing the 40 Under 40 award in the sports category. Her contributions to rugby league were further acknowledged by the Women in Sports Association (WISA), celebrating her as the first woman to own a rugby league team. Additionally, Ankomah's impressive achievements in sports earned her the title of Sports Personality of the Year by the Ghana Students Awards in 2023.

== General references ==
- "Ghana Rugby League recommended for Affiliate Membership of International Rugby League". Rugby League International Federation. 2020-10-27. Archived from the original on 2020-11-01.
- "Ghana Rugby League re-elects President and appoints range of committees". Rugby League International Federation. 2020-05-19. Archived from the original on 2021-06-28.
- "GHANA SKOLARS AND ATHENS RAIDERS ANNOUNCE CLUB PARTNERSHIP". lyfe. 2020-09-03.
