= Solomon Islands Rugby League Federation =

- Founded: 2008
- IRL affiliation: 2009–2025 (Observer)
- Responsibility: Australia
- Headquarters: Honiara
- Key people: William Tuhaika (2008-) (Chair)
- Coach: Matt and Graeme
- Competitions: none
- Website: Solomon Islands page @ Rugby League Planet

(Solomon Islands)
- As of 5 January 2010

The Solomon Islands Rugby League Federation (founded 10 November 2008) is responsible for trying to promote of the sport of rugby league in the Solomon Islands which is still unknown.

In 2009, they were granted observer member status of the Rugby League International Federation. In June 2025, they were expelled from the organisation due to non-submission of the annual membership audit for least three years.

== See also ==
- Rugby league in the Solomon Islands
- Solomon Islands national rugby league team
