= Major achievements in rugby by nation =

This article contains lists of achievements in major senior-level international rugby union, rugby sevens, rugby league and wheelchair rugby tournaments according to first-place, second-place and third-place results obtained by teams representing different nations. The objective is not to create combined medal tables; the focus is on listing the best positions achieved by teams in major international tournaments, ranking the nations according to the most number of podiums accomplished by teams of these nations.

== Results ==
For the making of these lists, results from following major international tournaments were consulted.

Form	Governing body	Tournament	Edition		
Form	Governing body	Tournament	First	Latest	Next
Rugby union	WR & IOC	Rugby union at the Summer Olympics (quadrennially)	1900	1924	Defunct
Rugby union	WR	Rugby World Cup (quadrennially)	1987	2023	2027
Rugby union	WR	Women's Rugby World Cup (quadrennially)	1991	2025	2029
Rugby sevens	WR & IOC	Rugby sevens at the Summer Olympics (quadrennially)	2016	2024	2028
Rugby sevens	WR	Rugby World Cup Sevens (quadrennially)	1993	2022	Defunct
Rugby sevens	WR	Rugby Women's World Cup Sevens (quadrennially)	2009	2022	Defunct
Rugby sevens	WR	World Rugby Sevens Series (annually)	1999–2000	2025–2026	2026–2027
Rugby sevens	WR	World Rugby Women's Sevens Series (annually)	2012–2013	2025–2026	2026–2027
Rugby league	IRL	Rugby League World Cup (quadrennially)	1954	2021	2026
Rugby league	IRL	Women's Rugby League World Cup (quadrennially)	2000	2021	2026
Wheelchair rugby	IWRF & IPC	Wheelchair rugby at the Summer Paralympics (quadrennially)	1996	2024	2028
Wheelchair rugby	IWRF	World Wheelchair Rugby Championships (quadrennially)	1995	2026	2030

- IOC: International Olympic Committee
- IPC: International Paralympic Committee
- RLIF: Rugby League International Federation
- WR: World Rugby

Medals for the demonstration events are NOT counted. Medals earned by athletes from defunct National Olympic Committees (NOCs) and National Paralympic Committees (NPCs) or historical teams are NOT merged with the results achieved by their immediate successor states. The International Olympic Committee (IOC) and International Paralympic Committee (IPC) do NOT combine medals of these nations or teams.

The tables are pre-sorted by total number of first-place results, second-place results and third-place results, then most first-place results, second-place results, respectively. When equal ranks are given, nations are listed in alphabetical order.

=== Rugby union, rugby sevens, rugby league and wheelchair rugby ===
Last updated after the 2026 Wheelchair Rugby World Championship (as of 23 August 2026)
		Rugby union			Rugby sevens						Rugby league		Wheelchair rugby		Number of			
		Olympic Games	World Cup		Olympic Games		World Cup		World Series		World Cup		Paralympic Games	World Championship	Number of			
Rk.	Nation	Men	Men	Women	Men	Women	Men	Women	Men	Women	Men	Women	Mixed	Mixed	1st place, gold medalist(s)	2nd place, silver medalist(s)	3rd place, bronze medalist(s)	Total
1	New Zealand		1st place, gold medalist(s)	1st place, gold medalist(s)	2nd place, silver medalist(s)	1st place, gold medalist(s)	1st place, gold medalist(s)	1st place, gold medalist(s)	1st place, gold medalist(s)	1st place, gold medalist(s)	1st place, gold medalist(s)	1st place, gold medalist(s)	1st place, gold medalist(s)	2nd place, silver medalist(s)	10	2	0	12
2	Australia		1st place, gold medalist(s)	3rd place, bronze medalist(s)		1st place, gold medalist(s)	2nd place, silver medalist(s)	1st place, gold medalist(s)	1st place, gold medalist(s)	1st place, gold medalist(s)	1st place, gold medalist(s)	1st place, gold medalist(s)	1st place, gold medalist(s)	1st place, gold medalist(s)	9	1	1	11
3	United States	1st place, gold medalist(s)		1st place, gold medalist(s)		3rd place, bronze medalist(s)		3rd place, bronze medalist(s)	2nd place, silver medalist(s)	2nd place, silver medalist(s)			1st place, gold medalist(s)	1st place, gold medalist(s)	4	2	2	8
4	France	1st place, gold medalist(s)	2nd place, silver medalist(s)	3rd place, bronze medalist(s)	1st place, gold medalist(s)	2nd place, silver medalist(s)		2nd place, silver medalist(s)		2nd place, silver medalist(s)	2nd place, silver medalist(s)				2	5	1	8
5	England^{†}		1st place, gold medalist(s)	1st place, gold medalist(s)			1st place, gold medalist(s)		2nd place, silver medalist(s)	2nd place, silver medalist(s)	2nd place, silver medalist(s)	3rd place, bronze medalist(s)			3	3	1	7
6	Great Britain	2nd place, silver medalist(s)			2nd place, silver medalist(s)				2nd place, silver medalist(s)		1st place, gold medalist(s)	2nd place, silver medalist(s)	1st place, gold medalist(s)		2	4	0	6
7	Canada			2nd place, silver medalist(s)		2nd place, silver medalist(s)		2nd place, silver medalist(s)		2nd place, silver medalist(s)			2nd place, silver medalist(s)	1st place, gold medalist(s)	1	5	0	6
8	Fiji				1st place, gold medalist(s)	3rd place, bronze medalist(s)	1st place, gold medalist(s)		1st place, gold medalist(s)	3rd place, bronze medalist(s)					3	0	2	5
9	South Africa		1st place, gold medalist(s)		3rd place, bronze medalist(s)		2nd place, silver medalist(s)	3rd place, bronze medalist(s)	1st place, gold medalist(s)						2	1	2	5
10	Argentina		3rd place, bronze medalist(s)		3rd place, bronze medalist(s)		2nd place, silver medalist(s)		1st place, gold medalist(s)						1	1	2	4
11	Samoa						3rd place, bronze medalist(s)		1st place, gold medalist(s)		2nd place, silver medalist(s)				1	1	1	3
12	Wales^{†}		3rd place, bronze medalist(s)				1st place, gold medalist(s)				3rd place, bronze medalist(s)				1	0	2	3
13	Japan												1st place, gold medalist(s)	1st place, gold medalist(s)	2	0	0	2
14	Ireland						3rd place, bronze medalist(s)		2nd place, silver medalist(s)						0	1	1	2
15	Kenya						3rd place, bronze medalist(s)		3rd place, bronze medalist(s)						0	0	2	2
15	Spain							3rd place, bronze medalist(s)	3rd place, bronze medalist(s)						0	0	2	2
17	Australasia^{*}	1st place, gold medalist(s)													1	0	0	1
18	Germany	2nd place, silver medalist(s)													0	1	0	1
18	(Māori people) New Zealand Māori											2nd place, silver medalist(s)			0	1	0	1
20	Romania	3rd place, bronze medalist(s)													0	0	1	1

^{*}Defunct National Olympic Committees (NOCs) and National Paralympic Committees (NPCs) or historical teams are shown in italic.
^{†}Non International Olympic Committee (IOC) members.

=== Rugby union, rugby sevens and rugby league ===
==== Men and women ====
Last updated after the 2025–26 SVNS (as of 7 June 2026)
		Rugby union			Rugby sevens						Rugby league		Number of			
		Olympic Games	World Cup		Olympic Games		World Cup		World Series		World Cup		Number of			
Rk.	Nation	Men	Men	Women	Men	Women	Men	Women	Men	Women	Men	Women	1st place, gold medalist(s)	2nd place, silver medalist(s)	3rd place, bronze medalist(s)	Total
1	New Zealand		1st place, gold medalist(s)	1st place, gold medalist(s)	2nd place, silver medalist(s)	1st place, gold medalist(s)	1st place, gold medalist(s)	1st place, gold medalist(s)	1st place, gold medalist(s)	1st place, gold medalist(s)	1st place, gold medalist(s)	1st place, gold medalist(s)	9	1	0	10
2	Australia		1st place, gold medalist(s)	3rd place, bronze medalist(s)		1st place, gold medalist(s)	2nd place, silver medalist(s)	1st place, gold medalist(s)	1st place, gold medalist(s)	1st place, gold medalist(s)	1st place, gold medalist(s)	1st place, gold medalist(s)	7	1	1	9
3	France	1st place, gold medalist(s)	2nd place, silver medalist(s)	3rd place, bronze medalist(s)	1st place, gold medalist(s)	2nd place, silver medalist(s)		2nd place, silver medalist(s)		2nd place, silver medalist(s)	2nd place, silver medalist(s)		2	5	1	8
4	England^{†}		1st place, gold medalist(s)	1st place, gold medalist(s)			1st place, gold medalist(s)		2nd place, silver medalist(s)	2nd place, silver medalist(s)	2nd place, silver medalist(s)		3	3	0	6
5	Great Britain	2nd place, silver medalist(s)			2nd place, silver medalist(s)				2nd place, silver medalist(s)	1st place, gold medalist(s)	1st place, gold medalist(s)	2nd place, silver medalist(s)	2	4	0	6
6	United States	1st place, gold medalist(s)		1st place, gold medalist(s)		3rd place, bronze medalist(s)		3rd place, bronze medalist(s)	2nd place, silver medalist(s)	2nd place, silver medalist(s)			2	2	2	6
7	Fiji				1st place, gold medalist(s)	3rd place, bronze medalist(s)	1st place, gold medalist(s)		1st place, gold medalist(s)	3rd place, bronze medalist(s)			3	0	2	5
8	South Africa		1st place, gold medalist(s)		3rd place, bronze medalist(s)		2nd place, silver medalist(s)	3rd place, bronze medalist(s)	1st place, gold medalist(s)				2	1	2	5
9	Argentina		3rd place, bronze medalist(s)		3rd place, bronze medalist(s)		2nd place, silver medalist(s)		1st place, gold medalist(s)				1	1	2	4
10	Canada			2nd place, silver medalist(s)		2nd place, silver medalist(s)		2nd place, silver medalist(s)		2nd place, silver medalist(s)			0	4	0	4
11	Samoa						3rd place, bronze medalist(s)		1st place, gold medalist(s)		2nd place, silver medalist(s)		1	1	1	3
12	Wales^{†}		3rd place, bronze medalist(s)				1st place, gold medalist(s)				3rd place, bronze medalist(s)		1	0	2	3
13	Ireland						3rd place, bronze medalist(s)		2nd place, silver medalist(s)				0	1	1	2
14	Kenya						3rd place, bronze medalist(s)		3rd place, bronze medalist(s)				0	0	2	2
15	Australasia^{*}	1st place, gold medalist(s)											1	0	0	1
16	Germany	2nd place, silver medalist(s)											0	1	0	1
17	Romania	3rd place, bronze medalist(s)											0	0	1	1
17	Spain								3rd place, bronze medalist(s)				0	0	1	1

^{*}Defunct National Olympic Committees (NOCs) or historical teams are shown in italic.
^{†}Non International Olympic Committee (IOC) members.

==== Men ====
Last updated after the 2025–26 SVNS (as of 7 June 2026)
		Rugby union		Rugby sevens			Rugby league	Number of			
		Olympic Games	World Cup	Olympic Games	World Cup	World Series	World Cup	Number of			
Rk.	Nation	Men	Men	Men	Men	Men	Men	1st place, gold medalist(s)	2nd place, silver medalist(s)	3rd place, bronze medalist(s)	Total
1	New Zealand		1st place, gold medalist(s)	2nd place, silver medalist(s)	1st place, gold medalist(s)	1st place, gold medalist(s)	1st place, gold medalist(s)	4	1	0	5
2	Australia		1st place, gold medalist(s)		2nd place, silver medalist(s)	1st place, gold medalist(s)	1st place, gold medalist(s)	3	1	0	4
3	England^{†}		1st place, gold medalist(s)		1st place, gold medalist(s)	2nd place, silver medalist(s)	2nd place, silver medalist(s)	2	2	0	4
3	France	1st place, gold medalist(s)	2nd place, silver medalist(s)	1st place, gold medalist(s)			2nd place, silver medalist(s)	2	2	0	4
5	South Africa		1st place, gold medalist(s)	3rd place, bronze medalist(s)	2nd place, silver medalist(s)	1st place, gold medalist(s)		2	1	1	4
6	Great Britain	2nd place, silver medalist(s)		2nd place, silver medalist(s)		2nd place, silver medalist(s)	1st place, gold medalist(s)	1	3	0	4
7	Argentina		3rd place, bronze medalist(s)	3rd place, bronze medalist(s)	2nd place, silver medalist(s)	1st place, gold medalist(s)		1	1	2	4
8	Fiji			1st place, gold medalist(s)	1st place, gold medalist(s)	1st place, gold medalist(s)		3	0	0	3
9	Samoa				3rd place, bronze medalist(s)	1st place, gold medalist(s)	2nd place, silver medalist(s)	1	1	1	3
10	Wales^{†}		3rd place, bronze medalist(s)		1st place, gold medalist(s)		3rd place, bronze medalist(s)	1	0	2	3
11	United States	1st place, gold medalist(s)				2nd place, silver medalist(s)		1	1	0	2
12	Ireland				3rd place, bronze medalist(s)	2nd place, silver medalist(s)		0	1	1	2
13	Kenya				3rd place, bronze medalist(s)	3rd place, bronze medalist(s)		0	0	2	2
14	Australasia^{*}	1st place, gold medalist(s)						1	0	0	1
15	Germany	2nd place, silver medalist(s)						0	1	0	1
16	Romania	3rd place, bronze medalist(s)						0	0	1	1
16	Spain					3rd place, bronze medalist(s)		0	0	1	1

^{*}Defunct National Olympic Committees (NOCs) or historical teams are shown in italic.
^{†}Non International Olympic Committee (IOC) members.

==== Women ====
Last updated after the 2025–26 Women's SVNS (as of 7 June 2026)
		Rugby union	Rugby sevens			Rugby league	Number of			
		World Cup	Olympic Games	World Cup	World Series	World Cup	Number of			
Rk.	Nation	Women	Women	Women	Women	Women	1st place, gold medalist(s)	2nd place, silver medalist(s)	3rd place, bronze medalist(s)	Total
1	New Zealand	1st place, gold medalist(s)	1st place, gold medalist(s)	1st place, gold medalist(s)	1st place, gold medalist(s)	1st place, gold medalist(s)	5	0	0	5
2	Australia	3rd place, bronze medalist(s)	1st place, gold medalist(s)	1st place, gold medalist(s)	1st place, gold medalist(s)	1st place, gold medalist(s)	4	0	1	5
3	United States	1st place, gold medalist(s)	3rd place, bronze medalist(s)	3rd place, bronze medalist(s)	2nd place, silver medalist(s)		1	1	2	4
4	Canada	2nd place, silver medalist(s)	2nd place, silver medalist(s)	2nd place, silver medalist(s)	2nd place, silver medalist(s)		0	4	0	4
5	France	3rd place, bronze medalist(s)	2nd place, silver medalist(s)	2nd place, silver medalist(s)	2nd place, silver medalist(s)		0	3	1	4
6	England^{†}	1st place, gold medalist(s)			2nd place, silver medalist(s)		1	1	0	2
6	Great Britain				1st place, gold medalist(s)	2nd place, silver medalist(s)	1	1	0	2
8	Fiji		3rd place, bronze medalist(s)		3rd place, bronze medalist(s)		0	0	2	2
9	South Africa			3rd place, bronze medalist(s)			0	0	1	1

^{†}Non International Olympic Committee (IOC) members.

=== Rugby union and rugby sevens ===
==== Men and women ====
Last updated after the 2025–26 SVNS (as of 7 June 2026)
		Rugby union			Rugby sevens						Number of			
		Olympic Games	World Cup		Olympic Games		World Cup		World Series		Number of			
Rk.	Nation	Men	Men	Women	Men	Women	Men	Women	Men	Women	1st place, gold medalist(s)	2nd place, silver medalist(s)	3rd place, bronze medalist(s)	Total
1	New Zealand		1st place, gold medalist(s)	1st place, gold medalist(s)	2nd place, silver medalist(s)	1st place, gold medalist(s)	1st place, gold medalist(s)	1st place, gold medalist(s)	1st place, gold medalist(s)	1st place, gold medalist(s)	7	1	0	8
2	Australia		1st place, gold medalist(s)	3rd place, bronze medalist(s)		1st place, gold medalist(s)	2nd place, silver medalist(s)	1st place, gold medalist(s)	1st place, gold medalist(s)	1st place, gold medalist(s)	5	1	1	7
3	France	1st place, gold medalist(s)	2nd place, silver medalist(s)	3rd place, bronze medalist(s)	1st place, gold medalist(s)	2nd place, silver medalist(s)		2nd place, silver medalist(s)		2nd place, silver medalist(s)	2	4	1	7
4	United States	1st place, gold medalist(s)		1st place, gold medalist(s)		3rd place, bronze medalist(s)		3rd place, bronze medalist(s)	2nd place, silver medalist(s)	2nd place, silver medalist(s)	2	2	2	6
5	England^{†}		1st place, gold medalist(s)	1st place, gold medalist(s)			1st place, gold medalist(s)		2nd place, silver medalist(s)	2nd place, silver medalist(s)	3	2	0	5
6	Fiji				1st place, gold medalist(s)	3rd place, bronze medalist(s)	1st place, gold medalist(s)		1st place, gold medalist(s)	3rd place, bronze medalist(s)	3	0	2	5
7	South Africa		1st place, gold medalist(s)		3rd place, bronze medalist(s)		2nd place, silver medalist(s)	3rd place, bronze medalist(s)	1st place, gold medalist(s)		2	1	2	5
8	Great Britain	2nd place, silver medalist(s)			2nd place, silver medalist(s)				2nd place, silver medalist(s)	1st place, gold medalist(s)	1	3	0	4
9	Argentina		3rd place, bronze medalist(s)		3rd place, bronze medalist(s)		2nd place, silver medalist(s)		1st place, gold medalist(s)		1	1	2	4
10	Canada			2nd place, silver medalist(s)		2nd place, silver medalist(s)		2nd place, silver medalist(s)		2nd place, silver medalist(s)	0	4	0	4
11	Samoa						3rd place, bronze medalist(s)		1st place, gold medalist(s)		1	0	1	2
11	Wales^{†}		3rd place, bronze medalist(s)				1st place, gold medalist(s)				1	0	1	2
13	Ireland						3rd place, bronze medalist(s)		2nd place, silver medalist(s)		0	1	1	2
14	Kenya						3rd place, bronze medalist(s)		3rd place, bronze medalist(s)		0	0	2	2
15	Australasia^{*}	1st place, gold medalist(s)									1	0	0	1
16	Germany	2nd place, silver medalist(s)									0	1	0	1
17	Romania	3rd place, bronze medalist(s)									0	0	1	1
17	Spain								3rd place, bronze medalist(s)		0	0	1	1

^{*}Defunct National Olympic Committees (NOCs) or historical teams are shown in italic.
^{†}Non International Olympic Committee (IOC) members.

==== Men ====
Last updated after the 2025–26 SVNS (as of 7 June 2026)
		Rugby union		Rugby sevens			Number of			
		Olympic Games	World Cup	Olympic Games	World Cup	World Series	Number of			
Rk.	Nation	Men	Men	Men	Men	Men	1st place, gold medalist(s)	2nd place, silver medalist(s)	3rd place, bronze medalist(s)	Total
1	New Zealand		1st place, gold medalist(s)	2nd place, silver medalist(s)	1st place, gold medalist(s)	1st place, gold medalist(s)	3	1	0	4
2	South Africa		1st place, gold medalist(s)	3rd place, bronze medalist(s)	2nd place, silver medalist(s)	1st place, gold medalist(s)	2	1	1	4
3	Argentina		3rd place, bronze medalist(s)	3rd place, bronze medalist(s)	2nd place, silver medalist(s)	1st place, gold medalist(s)	1	1	2	4
4	Fiji			1st place, gold medalist(s)	1st place, gold medalist(s)	1st place, gold medalist(s)	3	0	0	3
5	Australia		1st place, gold medalist(s)		2nd place, silver medalist(s)	1st place, gold medalist(s)	2	1	0	3
5	England^{†}		1st place, gold medalist(s)		1st place, gold medalist(s)	2nd place, silver medalist(s)	2	1	0	3
5	France	1st place, gold medalist(s)	2nd place, silver medalist(s)	1st place, gold medalist(s)			2	1	0	3
8	Great Britain	2nd place, silver medalist(s)		2nd place, silver medalist(s)		2nd place, silver medalist(s)	0	3	0	3
9	United States	1st place, gold medalist(s)				2nd place, silver medalist(s)	1	1	0	2
10	Samoa				3rd place, bronze medalist(s)	1st place, gold medalist(s)	1	0	1	2
10	Wales^{†}		3rd place, bronze medalist(s)		1st place, gold medalist(s)		1	0	1	2
12	Ireland				3rd place, bronze medalist(s)	2nd place, silver medalist(s)	0	1	1	2
13	Kenya				3rd place, bronze medalist(s)	3rd place, bronze medalist(s)	0	0	2	2
14	Australasia^{*}	1st place, gold medalist(s)					1	0	0	1
15	Germany	2nd place, silver medalist(s)					0	1	0	1
16	Romania	3rd place, bronze medalist(s)					0	0	1	1
16	Spain					3rd place, bronze medalist(s)	0	0	1	1

^{*}Defunct National Olympic Committees (NOCs) or historical teams are shown in italic.
^{†}Non International Olympic Committee (IOC) members.

==== Women ====
Last updated after the 2025–26 Women's SVNS (as of 7 June 2026)
		Rugby union	Rugby sevens			Number of			
		World Cup	Olympic Games	World Cup	World Series	Number of			
Rk.	Nation	Women	Women	Women	Women	1st place, gold medalist(s)	2nd place, silver medalist(s)	3rd place, bronze medalist(s)	Total
1	New Zealand	1st place, gold medalist(s)	1st place, gold medalist(s)	1st place, gold medalist(s)	1st place, gold medalist(s)	4	0	0	4
2	Australia	3rd place, bronze medalist(s)	1st place, gold medalist(s)	1st place, gold medalist(s)	1st place, gold medalist(s)	3	0	1	4
3	United States	1st place, gold medalist(s)	3rd place, bronze medalist(s)	3rd place, bronze medalist(s)	2nd place, silver medalist(s)	1	1	2	4
4	Canada	2nd place, silver medalist(s)	2nd place, silver medalist(s)	2nd place, silver medalist(s)	2nd place, silver medalist(s)	0	4	0	4
5	France	3rd place, bronze medalist(s)	2nd place, silver medalist(s)	2nd place, silver medalist(s)	2nd place, silver medalist(s)	0	3	1	4
6	England^{†}	1st place, gold medalist(s)			2nd place, silver medalist(s)	1	1	0	2
7	Fiji		3rd place, bronze medalist(s)		3rd place, bronze medalist(s)	0	0	2	2
8	Great Britain				1st place, gold medalist(s)	1	0	0	1
9	South Africa			3rd place, bronze medalist(s)		0	0	1	1

^{†}Non International Olympic Committee (IOC) members.

=== Rugby union ===
Last updated after the 2025 Women's Rugby World Cup (as of 27 September 2025)
		Rugby union			Number of			
		Olympic Games	World Cup		Number of			
Rk.	Nation	Men	Men	Women	1st place, gold medalist(s)	2nd place, silver medalist(s)	3rd place, bronze medalist(s)	Total
1	France	1st place, gold medalist(s)	2nd place, silver medalist(s)	3rd place, bronze medalist(s)	1	1	1	3
2	England^{†}		1st place, gold medalist(s)	1st place, gold medalist(s)	2	0	0	2
2	New Zealand		1st place, gold medalist(s)	1st place, gold medalist(s)	2	0	0	2
2	United States	1st place, gold medalist(s)		1st place, gold medalist(s)	2	0	0	2
5	Australia		1st place, gold medalist(s)	3rd place, bronze medalist(s)	1	0	1	2
6	Australasia^{*}	1st place, gold medalist(s)			1	0	0	1
6	South Africa		1st place, gold medalist(s)		1	0	0	1
8	Canada			2nd place, silver medalist(s)	0	1	0	1
8	Germany	2nd place, silver medalist(s)			0	1	0	1
8	Great Britain	2nd place, silver medalist(s)			0	1	0	1
11	Argentina		3rd place, bronze medalist(s)		0	0	1	1
11	Romania	3rd place, bronze medalist(s)			0	0	1	1
11	Wales^{†}		3rd place, bronze medalist(s)		0	0	1	1

^{*}Defunct National Olympic Committees (NOCs) or historical teams are shown in italic.
^{†}Non International Olympic Committee (IOC) members.

=== Rugby seven ===
==== Men and women ====
Last updated after the 2025–26 SVNS (as of 7 June 2026)
		Rugby sevens						Number of			
		Olympic Games		World Cup		World Series		Number of			
Rk.	Nation	Men	Women	Men	Women	Men	Women	1st place, gold medalist(s)	2nd place, silver medalist(s)	3rd place, bronze medalist(s)	Total
1	New Zealand	2nd place, silver medalist(s)	1st place, gold medalist(s)	1st place, gold medalist(s)	1st place, gold medalist(s)	1st place, gold medalist(s)	1st place, gold medalist(s)	5	1	0	6
2	Australia		1st place, gold medalist(s)	2nd place, silver medalist(s)	1st place, gold medalist(s)	1st place, gold medalist(s)	1st place, gold medalist(s)	4	1	0	5
3	Fiji	1st place, gold medalist(s)	3rd place, bronze medalist(s)	1st place, gold medalist(s)		1st place, gold medalist(s)	3rd place, bronze medalist(s)	3	0	2	5
4	France	1st place, gold medalist(s)	2nd place, silver medalist(s)		2nd place, silver medalist(s)		2nd place, silver medalist(s)	1	3	0	4
5	South Africa	3rd place, bronze medalist(s)		2nd place, silver medalist(s)	3rd place, bronze medalist(s)	1st place, gold medalist(s)		1	1	2	4
6	United States		3rd place, bronze medalist(s)		3rd place, bronze medalist(s)	2nd place, silver medalist(s)	2nd place, silver medalist(s)	0	2	2	4
7	England^{†}			1st place, gold medalist(s)		2nd place, silver medalist(s)	2nd place, silver medalist(s)	1	2	0	3
7	Great Britain	2nd place, silver medalist(s)				2nd place, silver medalist(s)	1st place, gold medalist(s)	1	2	0	3
9	Argentina	3rd place, bronze medalist(s)		2nd place, silver medalist(s)		1st place, gold medalist(s)		1	1	1	3
10	Canada		2nd place, silver medalist(s)		2nd place, silver medalist(s)		2nd place, silver medalist(s)	0	3	0	3
11	Samoa			3rd place, bronze medalist(s)		1st place, gold medalist(s)		1	0	1	2
12	Ireland			3rd place, bronze medalist(s)		2nd place, silver medalist(s)		0	1	1	2
13	Kenya			3rd place, bronze medalist(s)		3rd place, bronze medalist(s)		0	0	2	2
14	Wales^{†}			1st place, gold medalist(s)				1	0	0	1
15	Spain					3rd place, bronze medalist(s)		0	0	1	1

^{†}Non International Olympic Committee (IOC) members.

==== Men ====
Last updated after the 2025–26 SVNS (as of 7 June 2026)
		Rugby sevens			Number of			
		Olympic Games	World Cup	World Series	Number of			
Rk.	Nation	Men	Men	Men	1st place, gold medalist(s)	2nd place, silver medalist(s)	3rd place, bronze medalist(s)	Total
1	Fiji	1st place, gold medalist(s)	1st place, gold medalist(s)	1st place, gold medalist(s)	3	0	0	3
2	New Zealand	2nd place, silver medalist(s)	1st place, gold medalist(s)	1st place, gold medalist(s)	2	1	0	3
3	Argentina	3rd place, bronze medalist(s)	2nd place, silver medalist(s)	1st place, gold medalist(s)	1	1	1	3
3	South Africa	3rd place, bronze medalist(s)	2nd place, silver medalist(s)	1st place, gold medalist(s)	1	1	1	3
5	Australia		2nd place, silver medalist(s)	1st place, gold medalist(s)	1	1	0	2
5	England^{†}		1st place, gold medalist(s)	2nd place, silver medalist(s)	1	1	0	2
7	Samoa		3rd place, bronze medalist(s)	1st place, gold medalist(s)	1	0	1	2
8	Great Britain	2nd place, silver medalist(s)		2nd place, silver medalist(s)	0	2	0	2
9	Ireland		3rd place, bronze medalist(s)	2nd place, silver medalist(s)	0	1	1	2
10	Kenya		3rd place, bronze medalist(s)	3rd place, bronze medalist(s)	0	0	2	2
11	France	1st place, gold medalist(s)			1	0	0	1
11	Wales^{†}		1st place, gold medalist(s)		1	0	0	1
13	United States			2nd place, silver medalist(s)	0	1	0	1
14	Spain			3rd place, bronze medalist(s)	0	0	1	1

^{†}Non International Olympic Committee (IOC) members.

==== Women ====
Last updated after the 2025–26 Women's SVNS (as of 7 June 2026)
		Rugby sevens			Number of			
		Olympic Games	World Cup	World Series	Number of			
Rk.	Nation	Women	Women	Women	1st place, gold medalist(s)	2nd place, silver medalist(s)	3rd place, bronze medalist(s)	Total
1	Australia	1st place, gold medalist(s)	1st place, gold medalist(s)	1st place, gold medalist(s)	3	0	0	3
1	New Zealand	1st place, gold medalist(s)	1st place, gold medalist(s)	1st place, gold medalist(s)	3	0	0	3
3	Canada	2nd place, silver medalist(s)	2nd place, silver medalist(s)	2nd place, silver medalist(s)	0	3	0	3
3	France	2nd place, silver medalist(s)	2nd place, silver medalist(s)	2nd place, silver medalist(s)	0	3	0	3
5	United States	3rd place, bronze medalist(s)	3rd place, bronze medalist(s)	2nd place, silver medalist(s)	0	1	2	3
6	Fiji	3rd place, bronze medalist(s)		3rd place, bronze medalist(s)	0	0	2	2
7	Great Britain			1st place, gold medalist(s)	1	0	0	1
8	England^{†}			2nd place, silver medalist(s)	0	1	0	1
9	South Africa		3rd place, bronze medalist(s)		0	0	1	1

^{†}Non International Olympic Committee (IOC) members.

=== Rugby league ===
Last updated after the 2021 Rugby League World Cup (as of 19 November 2022)
		Rugby league		Number of			
		World Cup		Number of			
Rk.	Nation	Men	Women	1st place, gold medalist(s)	2nd place, silver medalist(s)	3rd place, bronze medalist(s)	Total
1	Australia	1st place, gold medalist(s)	1st place, gold medalist(s)	2	0	0	2
1	New Zealand	1st place, gold medalist(s)	1st place, gold medalist(s)	2	0	0	2
3	Great Britain	1st place, gold medalist(s)	2nd place, silver medalist(s)	1	1	0	2
4	England^{†}	2nd place, silver medalist(s)		0	1	0	1
4	France	2nd place, silver medalist(s)		0	1	0	1
4	Samoa	2nd place, silver medalist(s)		0	1	0	1
7	Wales^{†}	3rd place, bronze medalist(s)		0	0	1	1

^{†}Non International Olympic Committee (IOC) members.

=== Wheelchair rugby ===
Last updated after the 2026 Wheelchair Rugby World Championship (as of 23 August 2026)
		Wheelchair rugby		Number of			
		Paralympic Games	World Championship	Number of			
Rk.	Nation	Mixed	Mixed	1st place, gold medalist(s)	2nd place, silver medalist(s)	3rd place, bronze medalist(s)	Total
1	Australia	1st place, gold medalist(s)	1st place, gold medalist(s)	2	0	0	2
1	Japan	1st place, gold medalist(s)	1st place, gold medalist(s)	2	0	0	2
1	United States	1st place, gold medalist(s)	1st place, gold medalist(s)	2	0	0	2
4	Canada	2nd place, silver medalist(s)	1st place, gold medalist(s)	1	1	0	2
4	New Zealand	1st place, gold medalist(s)	2nd place, silver medalist(s)	1	1	0	2
6	Great Britain	1st place, gold medalist(s)		1	0	0	1

^{†}Non International Paralympic Committee (IPC) members.

== See also ==
- World Rugby Rankings
- RLIF World Rankings
- List of major achievements in sports by nation
