= Cook Islands Round Cup (rugby league) =

Cook Islands rugby league football competition

- Sport: Rugby league
- Founded: 1992; 34 years ago
- No. of teams: 6
- Region: Rarotonga (formerly included Aitutaki)
- Current premiers: Tupapa Maraerenga Panthers (8th premiership) (2025)
- Most premierships: Ngatangiia/Matavera Sea Eagles (9 premierships)
- Broadcaster: Vaka Television
- Level on pyramid: 1
- Website: cookislandsrugbyleague.com/national/

The Cook Islands Round Cup is the top level rugby league competition of the Cook Islands Rugby League Association in the Cook Islands.

The Tupapa Maraerenga Panthers won the 2025 premiership title.

== Teams ==
Team name	Nickname	Home ground
Tupapa Maraerenga	Panthers	Victoria Park
Titikaveka	Bulldogs	Temurimotia Park
Ngatangiia/Matavera	Sea Eagles	Nukupure Park
Arorangi	Bears	Raemaru Park
Takuvaine	Warriors	Takuvaine Field
Avatiu/Nikao	Eels	Avatiu Sports Ground

=== Former clubs ===
- Aitutaki Sharks

== Winners ==
Year	Club
1992	Ngatangiia/Matavera Sea Eagles
1993	Ngatangiia/Matavera Sea Eagles
1994	Ngatangiia/Matavera Sea Eagles
1995	Ngatangiia/Matavera Sea Eagles
1996	Ngatangiia/Matavera Sea Eagles
1997	Ngatangiia/Matavera Sea Eagles
1998	Ngatangiia/Matavera Sea Eagles
1999	Avatiu/Nikao Eels
2000	Ngatangiia/Matavera Sea Eagles
2001	Titikaveka Bulldogs
2002	Titikaveka Bulldogs
2003	Arorangi Bears
2004	Avatiu/Nikao Eels
2005	Tupapa Maraerenga Panthers
2006	Avatiu/Nikao Eels
2007	Avatiu/Nikao Eels
2008	Tupapa Maraerenga Panthers
2009	Tupapa Maraerenga Panthers
2010	Avatiu/Nikao Eels
2011	Avatiu/Nikao Eels
2012	Titikaveka Bulldogs
2013	Tupapa Maraerenga Panthers
2014	Tupapa Maraerenga Panthers
2015	Avatiu/Nikao Eels
2016	Avatiu/Nikao Eels
2017	Titikaveka Bulldogs
2018	Tupapa Maraerenga Panthers
2019	Ngatangiia/Matavera Sea Eagles
2020	(Season Suspended due to COVID) Ngatangiia/Matavera Sea Eagles retain Premiership
2021	Tupapa Maraerenga Panthers
2022	(Season Suspended due to COVID in the country) Tupapa Maraerenga Panthers retain Premiership
2023	Arorangi Bears

Club	Premiership Titles
Ngatangiia/Matavera Sea Eagles	10
Avatiu/Nikao Eels	9
Tupapa Maraerenga Panthers	9
Titikaveka Bulldogs	5
Arorangi Bears	2

== See also ==
- Rugby league in the Cook Islands
- Cook Islands Rugby League Association
