= Solomon Islands national rugby league team =

Solomon Islands

Team information
- Nickname: Solies
- Governing body: Solomon Islands Rugby League Federation
- Region: Asia-Pacific
- Head coach: John Jewiss & Luke Heckendorf
- Captain: Carlwyn Tengemoana
- Home stadium: Town Ground, Honiara
- IRL ranking: 49th

Team results
- First international
- Vanuatu 48–30 Solomon Islands (7 October 2013)
- Biggest win
- Solomon Islands 56–14 Hong Kong (13 October 2018)
- Biggest defeat
- Vanuatu 48–30 Solomon Islands (7 October 2013)

The Solomon Islands national rugby league team (nicknamed the Solies) represents the Solomon Islands in the sport of rugby league football.

== History ==
Rugby league in the Solomon Islands has existed sporadically since the 1990s. The Solomon Islands Rugby League Federation was officially formed in 2008 and the national team played its first official match in 2013, losing to Vanuatu on October 7.

Solomon Islands participated in the 2015 Pacific Games, their first international rugby league tournament. Solomon Islands participated in the 2018 Emerging Nations World Championship.

== Current squad ==
Squad selected for the 2018 Emerging Nations World Championship.

- Henry Angikimua (Coral Sea Roosters)
- Shatler Angikitasi (Soli Solitudes)
- Joshua Fiumae (Honiara Hurricanes)
- Damien Horoi (Corrimal)
- Wilson Ifunoa (Soli Solitudes)
- Steve Kauga (Soli Solitudes)
- Gareth Kengalu (Coral Sea Roosters)
- Gary Kiliko (Honiara Hurricanes)
- Elton Loea (Soli Solitudes)
- Jimmy Maebata (Tigoa Tigers)
- Mostyn Meanu’u (Kira Kira Kutters)
- Ezikiel Mana(Kira Kira Kutters)
- Fraser Manau (Honiara Hurricanes)
- Eddie Moe’ava (Kira Kira Kutters)
- Steven Momoa (Gizo Giants)
- Francis Ramo (Soli Solitudes)
- Metcalf Sa’atai (Honiara Hurricanes)
- Timo Sanga (Kira Kira Kutters)
- Daniel Saomatangi (Coral Sea Roosters)
- Scott Saonuku (Coral Sea Roosters)
- Jefferson Scott (Kira Kira Kutters)
- Moses Singamoana (Coral Sea Roosters)
- Ronsly Tango (Kira Kira Kutters)
- Tony Taupongi (Coral Sea Roosters)
- Allen Junior Tavake (Coral Sea Roosters)
- Ozil Tela (Kira Kira Kutters)
- Carlwyn Tengemoana (Honiara Hurricanes)
- Billy Junior Toate’e (Soli Solitudes)
- Darwyn Tongaka (Honiara Hurricanes)
- Larvenstarr Tongaka (Honiara Hurricanes)
- Frank Vaikai (Coral Sea Roosters)

== Competitive record ==
Below is table of the official representative rugby league matches played by Solomon Islands until 24 December 2020.

=== Overall ===
Opponent	Played	Won	Drawn	Lost	Win %	For	Aga	Diff
Hong Kong	2	2	0	0	100%	88	26	+62
Japan	1	1	0	0	100%	44	22	+22
Turkey	1	0	0	1	0%	22	30	-8
Vanuatu	3	0	0	3	0%	65	112	-47
Total	7	3	0	4	42.86%	219	190	+29

=== Results ===
Year	Date	Result	Venue	City	Attendance	Competition
2013	7 October	Vanuatu defeated Solomon Islands 48-30	Stadium Mackay	Mackay, Australia	1,648	Friendly
2016	16 October	Vanuatu defeated Solomon Islands 24-16	Port Vila Stadium	Port Vila, Vanuatu	10,000 (estimated)	Friendly
2017	22 October	Vanuatu defeated Solomon Islands 40-20	Lawson Tama Stadium	Honiara, Solomon Islands	26,000 (estimated)	Friendly
2018	1 October	Turkey defeated Solomon Islands 30-22	Windsor Sporting Complex	Sydney, Australia	11,456	2018 Emerging Nations World Championship
2018	7 October	Solomon Islands defeated Hong Kong 32-12	New Era Stadium, Cabramatta	Sydney, Australia	13,456	2018 Emerging Nations World Championship
2018	9 October	Solomon Islands defeated Japan 44-22	New Era Stadium, Cabramatta	Sydney, Australia	12,345	2018 Emerging Nations World Championship Bowl play-off
2018	13 October	Solomon Islands defeated Hong Kong 56-14	St.Marys Leagues Stadium, St.Marys	Sydney, Australia	16,467	2018 Emerging Nations World Championship Bowl play-off

== IRL Rankings ==
IRL Men's World Rankings
Official rankings as of August 2026
Rank	Change	Team	Pts %
1	Steady	Australia	100
2	Steady	New Zealand	82
3	Steady	England	70
4	Steady	Samoa	56
5	Steady	Tonga	54
6	Steady	Papua New Guinea	47
7	Steady	Fiji	34
8	▲1	Cook Islands	24
9	▲2	Netherlands	23
10	▲2	Ukraine	21
11	▼3	France	21
12	▼2	Serbia	20
13	Steady	Wales	18
14	Steady	Ireland	17
15	Steady	Greece	14
16	Steady	Malta	14
17	▲12	Canada	13
18	▼1	Italy	11
19	▼1	Jamaica	9
20	▲7	Scotland	8
21	▲1	United States	8
22	▼3	Poland	7
23	▼3	Lebanon	7
24	▼1	Germany	7
25	▼1	Czech Republic	6
26	▼5	Norway	6
27	▼2	Chile	5
28	▲2	Philippines	5
29	▼1	South Africa	4
30	Steady	Brazil	3
31	Steady	Morocco	3
32	▲1	Argentina	3
33	▲2	Ghana	2
34	▲2	Kenya	2
35	▼1	Montenegro	2
36	▲1	Nigeria	2
37	▼5	North Macedonia	1
38	Steady	Albania	1
39	Steady	Turkey	1
40	Steady	Bulgaria	1
41	Steady	Cameroon	0
42	Steady	Japan	0
43	Steady	Spain	0
44	Steady	Colombia	0
45	Steady	Russia	0
46	Steady	El Salvador	0
47	Steady	Bosnia and Herzegovina	0
48	Steady	Hong Kong	0
49	Steady	Solomon Islands	0
50	Steady	Vanuatu	0
51	Steady	Hungary	0
52	Steady	Latvia	0
53	Steady	Denmark	0
54	Steady	Belgium	0
55	Steady	Estonia	0
56	Steady	Sweden	0
57	Steady	Niue	0
Complete rankings at www.internationalrugbyleague.com

== See also ==
- Rugby league in the Solomon Islands
