= Pacific Islands Rugby League Federation =

- Founded: 2009
- IRL affiliation: 2009
- Responsibility: Southern Hemisphere
- Headquarters: Auckland, New Zealand
- Key people: Philemon Embel (Chair)
- As of 19 December 2011

The Pacific Islands Rugby League Federation (PIRLF) is the governing body of rugby league in the South Pacific.

Papua New Guinea's Sports Minister Philemon Embel is the chairman of the PIRLF.

== History ==
It was formed by the governing bodies of rugby league in Papua New Guinea (Papua New Guinea Rugby Football League), Tonga (Tonga National Rugby League), Samoa (Rugby League Samoa), Fiji (Fiji National Rugby League) and the Cook Islands (Cook Islands Rugby League Association) in December 2009 and affiliated to the Rugby League International Federation (RLIF).
