= Philemon Embel =

Papua New Guinean politician

Hon. Philemon Embel OBE (born 10 October 1962) is a Papua New Guinean politician. He was a member of the National Parliament of Papua New Guinea from 1987 to 2002 and from 2007 to 2012, representing the electorate of Nipa-Kutubu. He has held several positions within the government in PNG, including in the Ministry of Health, Mining, Transport and Civil Aviation. He was awarded an Officer of the Most Excellent Order of the British Empire (OBE) in 2000.

Embel acted as Minister for Sports and Minister Assisting the Prime Minister in former Prime Minister Sir Michael Somare's cabinet, until Prime Minister Peter O'Neill took control of the government in late 2011. In September 2010, Embel was physically attacked in his electorate of Poroma, in the Southern Highlands Province during Independence Day celebrations. He was on crutches for three months as a result of injuries sustained during the attack.

== Involvement in PNG Sports ==
As Minister for Sports, in April 2011, Embel donated K40,000 to the PNG football squad to fund their training activities ahead of their departure to the FIFA U20 World Cup qualifier in New Zealand.

Embel is the Chairman of the Pacific Islands Rugby League Federation (PIRLF), the governing body of rugby league in the South Pacific. Embel campaigned strongly for PNG to enter the National Rugby League (NRL) by 2020, seeking the support of former Australian Prime Minister Kevin Rudd and NRL bosses. According to Embel, the PNG NRL Bid was a "project of national importance", particularly for PNG's youth. However, in December 2011, Prime Minister Peter O'Neill said that the NRL Bid Board and CEO Brad Tassell had decided that PNG would not be added to the competition, citing that the Bid was a waste of public money

== Controversies ==
In 2009, the Waigani Committal Court committed Embel to stand trial in the National Court over the misappropriation of K165,000 in 2006. This money was provided by the Southern Highlands Provincial Government for the construction of a new church. Embel has sought to overturn the ruling and filed a Judicial Review in August 2011 at the National Court in Waigani, asking it to review the decision of the Committal Court.

In December 2011, Embel was accused by Minister of Planning Sam Basil of having received K51 million from the National Government from 2005 to 2011. Embel said that he did not know anything about this K51 million, and that he was aware of money going into his district treasury but did not know the purpose of these funds. He called on Basil to check why so much money was being pumped into his district without Embel's knowledge.

In April 2012, Embel admitted to physically assaulting a parliamentary staff member during an argument about his unpaid travel entitlements. Embel may face disciplinary charges from the Parliamentary Privileges Committee as a result of the incident.

National Parliament of Papua New Guinea
Preceded by Bai Waba	Member for Nipa-Kutubu Open; 1987–2002	Succeeded by Robert Kopaol
Preceded by Robert Kopaol	Member for Nipa-Kutubu Open; 2007–2012	Succeeded by Jeffery Komal
