= Sandis Tsaka =

Papua New Guinean rugby league administrator

Sandis Tsaka is a Papua New Guinean rugby league administrator. He is the Chairman of the Asia-Pacific Rugby League Confederation and also the chairman of Papua New Guinea Rugby Football League.
