= Jeffery Komal =

Papua New Guinean politician

Pesab Jeffery Komal (born 20 December 1968) is a Papua New Guinean politician. He has been a People's National Congress member of the National Parliament of Papua New Guinea since 2012, representing the electorate of Nipa-Kutubu Open.

Komal was educated at Puril Community School and Nipa High School. He was a businessman and the chairman of the Nipa Circuit of the United Church prior to entering politics. He was elected to the National Parliament at the 2012 election, defeating long-serving former MP Philemon Embel. He is chairman of the Law and Order Permanent Committee and a member of the Emergency Permanent Committee, the Private Business Permanent Committee, the Public Accounts Permanent Committee, the Public Works Permanent Committee, the Broadcasting of Parliamentary Proceedings Permanent Committee, the HIV/AIDS Advocacy Special Committee and the Lands and Environment Referral Committee.

National Parliament of Papua New Guinea
Preceded by Philemon Embel	Member for Nipa-Kutubu Open; 2012–present	Incumbent
