= Cook Islands national rugby league team =

Cook Islands

Team information
- Nickname: Aitu, Kuki's
- Governing body: Cook Islands Rugby League Association
- Region: Asia-Pacific
- Head coach: Karmichael Hunt
- Captain: KL Iro
- Most caps: Brad Takairangi
- IRL ranking: 8th

Uniforms
First colours	Second colours

Team results
- First international
- Cook Islands 22-8 Niue (Rarotonga, Cook Islands; 1986)
- Biggest win
- Cook Islands 66-6 South Africa (Sydney, Australia; 2019)
- Biggest defeat
- Tonga 92-10 Cook Islands (Middlesbrough, England; 31 October 2022)
- World Cup
- Appearances: 3 (first time in 2000)
- Best result: Group stage, 2000; 2013; 2021.

The Cook Islands national rugby league team have represented the Cook Islands in international rugby league football since 1986. Administered by the Cook Islands Rugby League Association (CIRLA), the team has competed at three Rugby League World Cups, in 2000, 2013 and 2021.

== History ==
=== 1990s ===
Before 1995, the Cooks' international experience was limited to participation in the Pacific Cup, and hosting the touring British Amateur Rugby League Association Great Britain Amateur teams. Nonetheless, the sizeable number of expatriate Cook Islanders living and playing in New Zealand has ensured that they have never been short of players with rugby league experience.

They won the 1995 Emerging Nations tournament, defeating United States, Russia and Scotland before beating Ireland in the final.

In 1996 and 1997 the Cook Islands competed in the Super League World Nines. They also played several full internationals against other South Pacific nations, most notably as part of the Papua New Guinea 50th Anniversary Tournament in October 1998. 2000 saw the Cook Islands competing in the World Cup for the first time. They finished third in their pool after losing to Wales and the Kiwis and only managing a draw against Lebanon.

=== 2000s ===
The Cook Islands successfully toured New Zealand in 2005 with a three test series against the New Zealand Māori ending in a draw after the first test was drawn 26–26 and the second and third tests were split between both sides.

The Cook Islands played Fiji, Tonga and Samoa in the Pacific pool of Qualifying for the 2008 Rugby League World Cup. Fiji and Tonga qualified, and Samoa earned a second chance in the repecharge round. The Cook Islands, having lost to all three teams, were eliminated.

The Cook Islands participated in the 2009 Pacific Cup. Having beaten Samoa to earn a place in the tournament, they went on to defeat favourites Fiji and earn a place in the final of the competition.

=== 2010s ===
The Cook Islands were given automatic entry into the 2013 Rugby League World Cup they were placed in Pool D alongside Wales and the United States before playing an Inter-Group match against Tonga. Going into the Tournament, 'the Kukis' had never won a World Cup match. The team lost to the USA and to Tonga, but they won their last match against the Tournament co-hosts Wales, making history for the sport of rugby league in the Cook Islands. This is the Cook Islands' best Rugby League World Cup result to date.

In October 2015 the Cook Islands took on Tonga in the Asia-Pacific elimination play-off to determine which of the two Asia-Pacific nations would qualify for the 2017 Rugby League World Cup. After a tight first half, the Tongans would go on win the match scoring 16 points within the last 20 minutes of the game.

In June 2019, Cook Islands took on South Africa at Ringrose Park in Wentworthville, winning 66–6. They then went on to play the United States at Hodges Stadium in Jacksonville in November. They won 38–16, qualifying them into the 2021 Rugby League World Cup. At the 2021 Rugby League World Cup, the Cook Islands narrowly beat part timers Wales 18-12 before losing their second group stage match against Papua New Guinea. In their final group stage match, the Cook Islands suffered their worst ever defeat as they were beaten 92-10 by Tonga at the Riverside Stadium.

== Players ==
=== Current squad ===
The Cook Islands squad for the 2026 Rugby League World Cup. The squad was announced via social media on 6 October 2026. KL Iro and Marata Niukore were appointed joint captains.

Jersey numbers in the table reflect selections for the Round 3 match against Australia.

Statistics in this table are compiled from the website, Rugby League Project..

J#	Player	Age	Position(s)	Cook Islands						Club	Club Matches		Other Representative Matches
J#	Player	Age	Position(s)	Dbt	M	T	G	F	P	Club	Tier 1	Tier 2	Other Representative Matches
1	Valentine Holmes	31	Fullback, Centre	2026	2	0	3	0	6	St. George Illawarra Dragons	241	0	21 22 1
2	Paul Ulberg	30	Wing	2019	9	5	0	0	20	Toulouse Olympique	22	161
3	Kayal Iro	26	Centre	2019	14	3	1	0	14	Cronulla-Sutherland Sharks	61	0
4	Reubenn Rennie	31	Centre	2016	15	5	0	0	20	Toulouse Olympique	10	166
5	Cameron Brown	22	Wing, Centre	2026	3	0	0	0	0	Brisbane Tigers	0	14
6	Maui Winitana-Patelesio	—	Five-eighth, Halfback	2026	3	1	2	0	8	New Zealand Warriors	0	6
17	Brad Takairangi	37	Halfback, Centre	2009	17	1	3	0	10	Glebe Dirty Reds	202	3	4 2
8	Davvy Moale	23	Prop	2022	12	5	0	0	20	Melbourne Storm	80	23
9	Rua Ngatikaura	26	Hooker	2022	12	4	0	0	16	Glebe Dirty Reds	0	48
10	Rhys Dakin	25	Prop	2023	8	0	0	0	0	Sydney Roosters	0	62
11	Amare Milford	20	Second-row	2026	2	0	0	0	0	Melbourne Storm	0	1
12	Delahia Wigmore	—	Second-row, Centre	2024	6	1	0	0	4	Penrith Panthers	0	14
13	Mason Teague	23	Lock, Hooker	2024	8	1	0	0	4	Burleigh Bears	8	75
14	K-Ci Newton-Whare	22	Prop	2026	3	0	0	0	0	Melbourne Storm	0	23
15	Makahesi Makatoa	33	Prop	2015	15	1	0	0	4	Sydney Roosters	61	168
16	David Tuariki	—	Second-row	2026	2	0	0	0	0	Melbourne Storm	0	0
7	Esan Marsters	30	Halfback, Fullback	2015	15	3	3	0	18	Bradford Bulls	154	37	6 4
18	Chaev Kolone	19	Prop	2026	2	0	0	0	0	Canberra Raiders	0	10
19	Glassie Glassie	—	Centre	—	0	0	0	0	0	Wests Tigers	0	0
20	Brody Tamarua	27	Second-row	2019	3	0	0	0	0	Norths Devils	0	33
21	Pride Petterson-Robati	31	Lock, Prop	2019	12	1	0	0	4	Souths Logan Magpies	0	117
22	Esom Ioka	23	Fullback, Wing	2023	9	7	12	0	52	Brisbane Tigers	0	73
23	Reuben Porter	29	Second-row	2017	12	0	0	0	0	St. George Illawarra Dragons	8	130	1
IJ	Marata Niukore	30	Second-row	2017	4	4	0	0	16	New Zealand Warriors	166	50	6

Notes:

- Brody Tamarua was initially omitted but was named in the squad to play in the Round 1 match against Fiji.
- Marata Niukore sustained a groin injury at Cook Islands training and was omitted from the Round 1 team.
- Valentine Holmes was recovering from a syndesmosis injury sustained in an NRL match on 6 September 2026, and was also not named.
- Four members of the squad have previously played for other international teams:
  - Australia (1): Valentine Holmes (2016-18 & 2022-23, 21 matches).
  - New Zealand (3): Esan Marsters (2018-19, 6), Marata Niukore (2022-24, 6), and Brad Takairangi (2017, 3)
- Three members of the squad played in the 2026 Super League season: Marsters (9), Rennie (10), and Ulberg (22).
- Four members of the squad played in the 2026 NRL season: Holmes (24 matches), Iro (23), Moale (10), and Niukore (9).
  - Two of the four also played in the second-tier NSW Cup: Moale (9) and Niukore (9).
- For twelve members of the squad, their highest level club football during 2026 was in the second-tier state competitions:
  - NSW (8): Dakin (1), Kolone (10), Makatoa (4), Milford (1), Newton-Whare (22), Porter (4), Wigmore (13), and Winitana-Patelesio (6).
  - QLD (5): Brown (5), Ioka (21), Petterson-Robati (20), Tamarua, and Teague (18).
- Two members of the squad played in the third-tier Ron Massey Cup: Ngatikaura and Takairangi:
- Two members of the squad played in the 2026 (Under 21) Jersey Flegg Cup: Glassie and Tuariki.

== Competitive record ==
Below is table of the representative rugby matches played by a Cook Islands national XIII at test level.

As of 22 October 2026

Opponent	Matches	Won	Drawn	Lost	Win %	For	Aga	Diff
American Samoa	1	1	0	0	100%	22	20	+2
Fiji	16	5	1	10	31.25%	263	489	–226
Ireland	1	1	0	0	100%	22	6	+16
Lebanon	3	2	1	0	66.67%	80	66	+14
New Zealand	2	0	0	2	0%	10	134	–56
(Māori people) New Zealand Maori	12	4	1	7	33.33%	216	312	–96
New Zealand Residents	2	0	0	2	0%	10	134	–124
Niue	3	2	0	1	66.67%	67	74	–7
Papua New Guinea	9	0	0	9	0%	142	352	–210
Rotuma	1	0	0	1	0%	10	17	–17
Russia	1	1	0	0	100%	58	20	+38
Samoa	8	2	0	6	25%	112	334	–222
Scotland	1	1	0	0	100%	21	10	+11
South Africa	2	2	0	0	100%	124	12	+112
Tokelau	1	1	0	0	100%	19	10	+9
Tonga	12	1	0	11	8.33%	151	425	–274
United States	3	2	0	1	66.67%	122	56	+66
Wales	3	2	0	1	66.67%	52	74	–22
Total	81	27	3	51	33.33%	1,497	2,473	–976

=== Rugby League World Cup ===
Rugby League World Cup record
Year	Result	Position	Pld	W	D	L	PF	PA
1954	did not participate							
1957	did not participate							
1960	did not participate							
(New Zealand) 1968	did not participate							
1970	did not participate							
1972	did not participate							
1975	did not participate							
1977	did not participate							
1985–88	did not participate							
1989–92	did not participate							
1995	did not qualify							
2000	Group stage	13th	3	0	1	2	38	144
2008	did not qualify							
2013	Group stage	9th	3	1	0	2	64	78
(Papua New Guinea) 2017	did not qualify							
2021	Group stage	11th	3	1	0	2	44	136
2026	Group Stage	9th	3	0	0	3	34	188
Total	–	–	12	2	1	9	180	546

=== Other competitions ===
The Cook Islands have also participated in:

- Pacific Cup (since 1986)
- Super League World Nines (1996, 1997)
- Super League Oceania Tournament (1997)
- Papua New Guinea 50th Anniversary Tournament (1998)
- Pacific Rim Competition (2004)

== IRL Rankings ==
IRL Men's World Rankings
Official rankings as of August 2026
Rank	Change	Team	Pts %
1	Steady	Australia	100
2	Steady	New Zealand	82
3	Steady	England	70
4	Steady	Samoa	56
5	Steady	Tonga	54
6	Steady	Papua New Guinea	47
7	Steady	Fiji	34
8	▲1	Cook Islands	24
9	▲2	Netherlands	23
10	▲2	Ukraine	21
11	▼3	France	21
12	▼2	Serbia	20
13	Steady	Wales	18
14	Steady	Ireland	17
15	Steady	Greece	14
16	Steady	Malta	14
17	▲12	Canada	13
18	▼1	Italy	11
19	▼1	Jamaica	9
20	▲7	Scotland	8
21	▲1	United States	8
22	▼3	Poland	7
23	▼3	Lebanon	7
24	▼1	Germany	7
25	▼1	Czech Republic	6
26	▼5	Norway	6
27	▼2	Chile	5
28	▲2	Philippines	5
29	▼1	South Africa	4
30	Steady	Brazil	3
31	Steady	Morocco	3
32	▲1	Argentina	3
33	▲2	Ghana	2
34	▲2	Kenya	2
35	▼1	Montenegro	2
36	▲1	Nigeria	2
37	▼5	North Macedonia	1
38	Steady	Albania	1
39	Steady	Turkey	1
40	Steady	Bulgaria	1
41	Steady	Cameroon	0
42	Steady	Japan	0
43	Steady	Spain	0
44	Steady	Colombia	0
45	Steady	Russia	0
46	Steady	El Salvador	0
47	Steady	Bosnia and Herzegovina	0
48	Steady	Hong Kong	0
49	Steady	Solomon Islands	0
50	Steady	Vanuatu	0
51	Steady	Hungary	0
52	Steady	Latvia	0
53	Steady	Denmark	0
54	Steady	Belgium	0
55	Steady	Estonia	0
56	Steady	Sweden	0
57	Steady	Niue	0
Complete rankings at www.internationalrugbyleague.com

== See also ==
- Rugby league in the Cook Islands
