= Town Ground, Honiara =

Town Ground
- Suburb
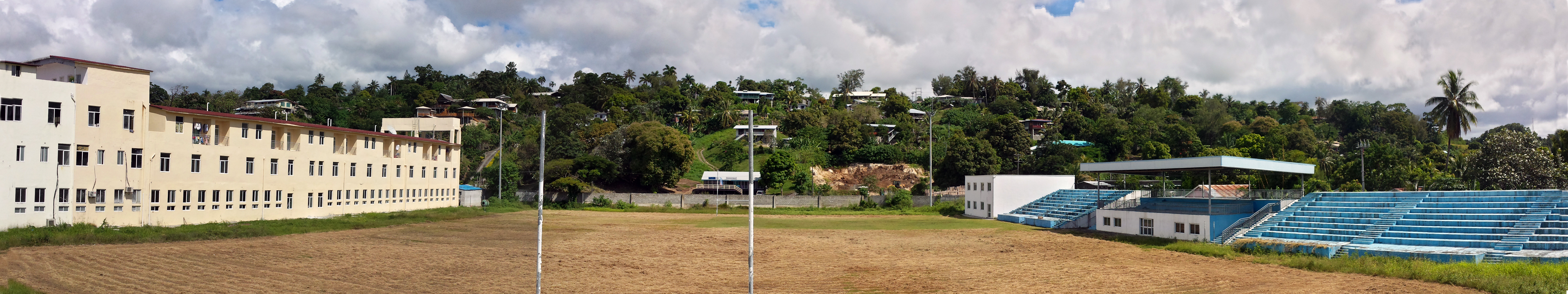
- Town Ground Stadium facing South

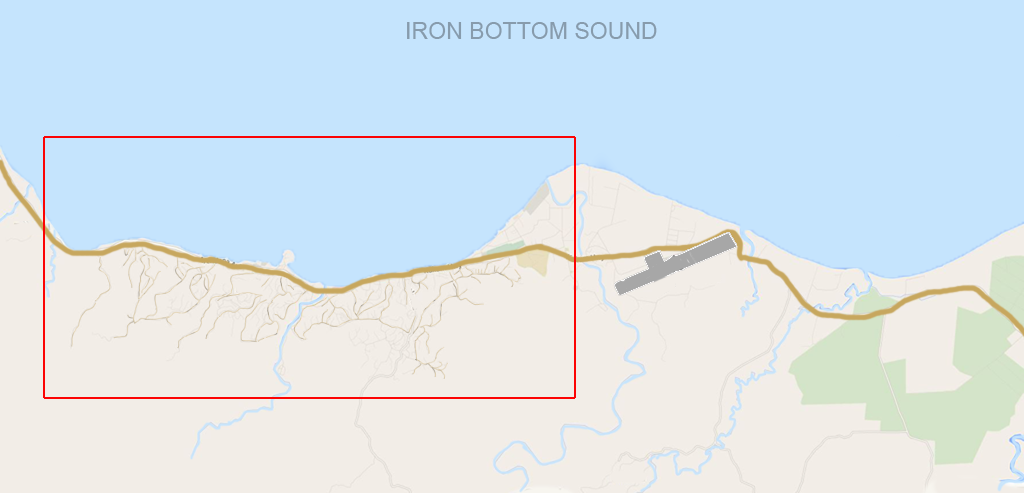
- Location in Honiara (Council boundary-red box)
- Coordinates: 9°26′S 159°57′E
- Country: Solomon Islands
- Province: Honiara Town
- Island: Guadalcanal
- Elevation: 29–100 m (95–328 ft)
- Time zone: UTC+11 (UTC)

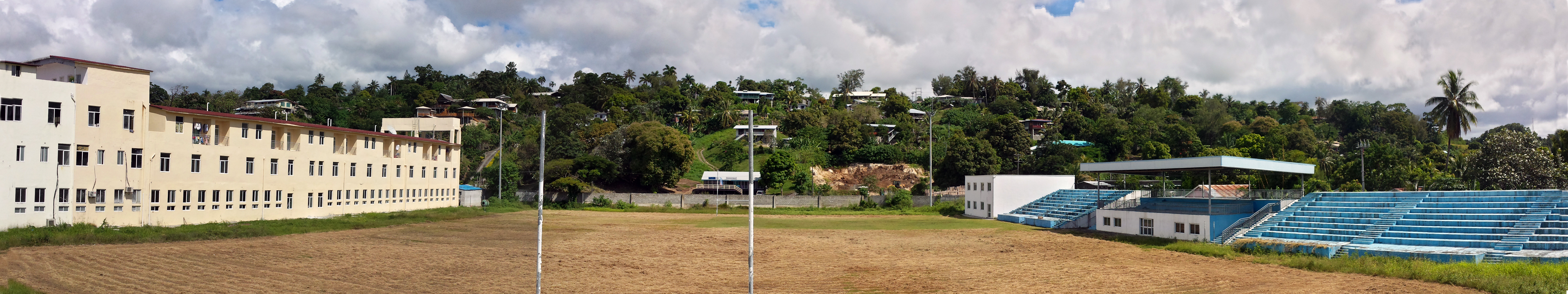

Town Ground is a suburb in Honiara, Solomon Islands, located in the main center on the Tandai Highway. Town Ground is in the Honiara City Council ward of Nggosi and Rove-Lengakiki. Town Ground is East of Rove and West of Point Cruz.

== Iron Bottom Sound Hotel ==
In 2003 Iron Bottom Sound Hotel was the initial base for the first elements of the intervention force sent to restore order following the civil tensions.

Prior to the 2006 ethnic riots, a political crisis was unfolding. The Prime Minister Snyder Rini, remained under police guard and the Opposition Leader Francis Billy Hilly and his party used Iron Bottom Sound as a base of operations prior to the motion of no confidence.

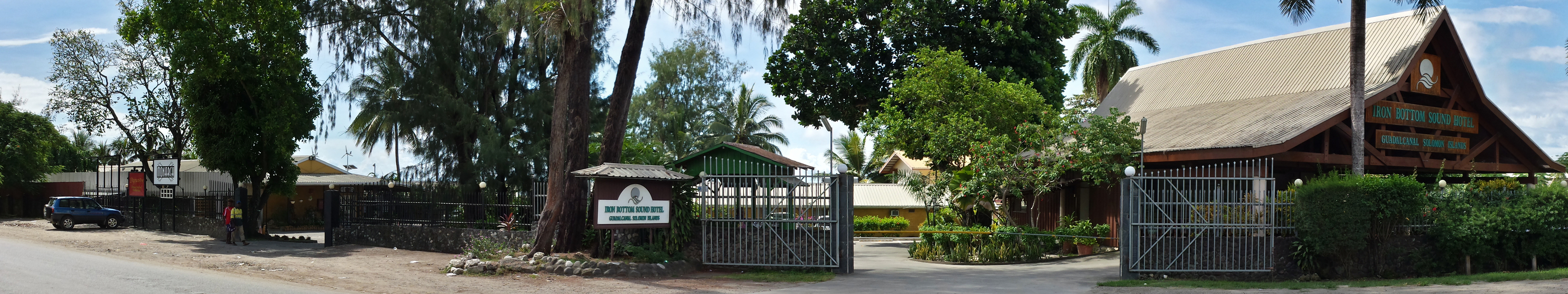
Iron Bottom Sound hotel facing from Mendana Ave North

== YWCA ==
The Young Women's Christian Association headquarters for Honiara are based in Town Ground. Feary, Sue; Lai, Jocelyn, (author.); Young Women's Christian Association of the Solomon Islands (2012), Stori blo YWCA : a history of the Young Women's Christian Association in Solomon Islands, Honiara, Solomon Islands YWCA-SI In 1978 a Solomon Islands chapter of the Young Women's Christian Association (YWCA) was established to address the specific needs of young women through developing personal growth and addressing various women's questions. The YWCA runs classes on sewing, cooking, and other home economics subjects demanded by women, complementing the work performed in these areas by the churches and the WDD. However, the YWCA has moved a step beyond this traditional focus in addressing some of the fundamental issues affecting women's lives. These include environmental matters, providing accommodation for young girls, and establishing a kindergarten. The Association recently undertook a new micro-credit scheme for disadvantaged women in Honiara as a government pilot project funded by the United Nations Development Program but the project has collapsed as a result of the political crisis.

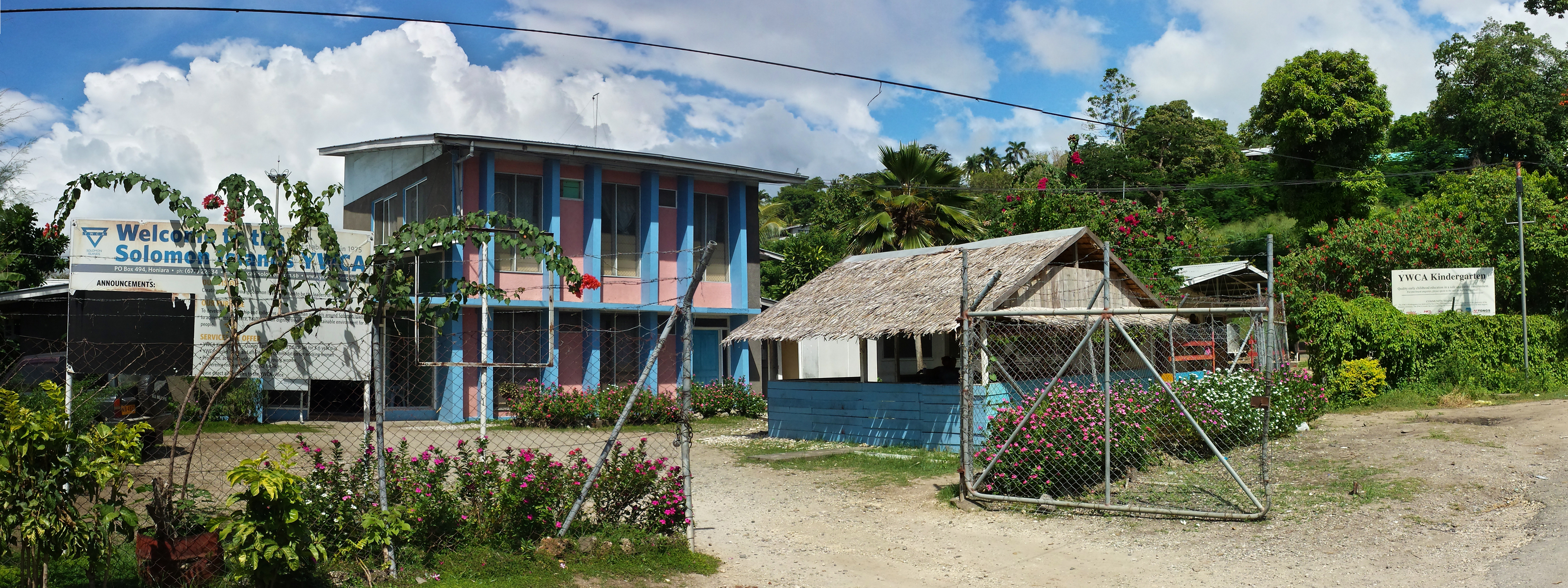
Young Women's Christian Association building and kindergarten

YWCA SI runs a young women's hostel in Honiara and kindergartens in both Honiara and Munda. Recently, the YWCA SI has also started to run training and programs for young women in leadership, human rights, gender and sexual and reproductive health.

In November 2014 the World YWCA and the YWCA of the Solomon Islands is hosting 30 women from Papua New Guinea, Solomon Islands and Samoa for the Pacific skills and leadership training.

In 2011 Solomon Islands YWCA member, Jenta Tau travelled to Geneva to begin a one-year internship with the World YWCA.

== Town Ground Stadium ==
The Town Ground stadium is located off the Mendana Hwy near the YWCA and is the location for shows and displays.

Town Ground is the home for the Solomon Islands national rugby league team.

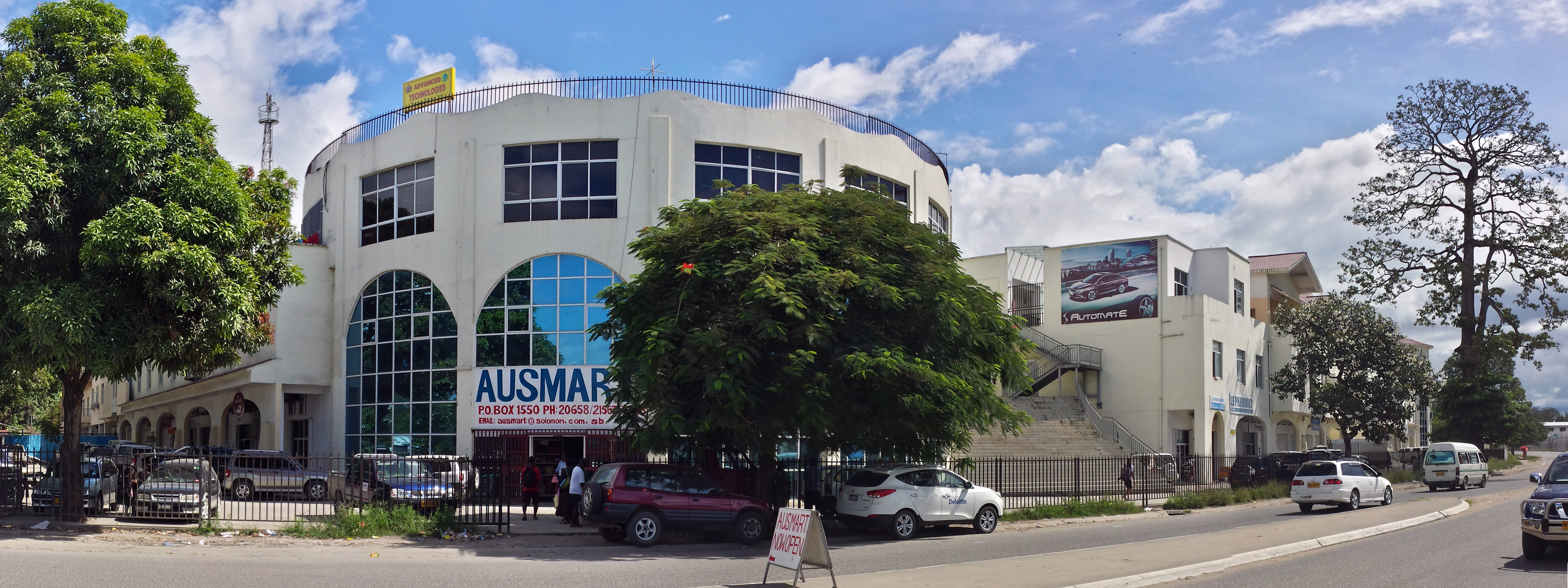
Sol Plaza, Honiara

== Sol Plaza ==
The recently reopened Sol Plaza was previously described as a failed building.

On March 16, 2012, the managing director of China United (SI) Corporation Ltd has been arrested for failing to comply with council warning notices for the Sol Plaza building to vacateas there was no occupancy permit issued.

== Central Government Buildings and Office of the Prime Minister ==
The Central Government Buildings and Office of the Prime Minister are located on Mendana Ave, opposite the High Court.

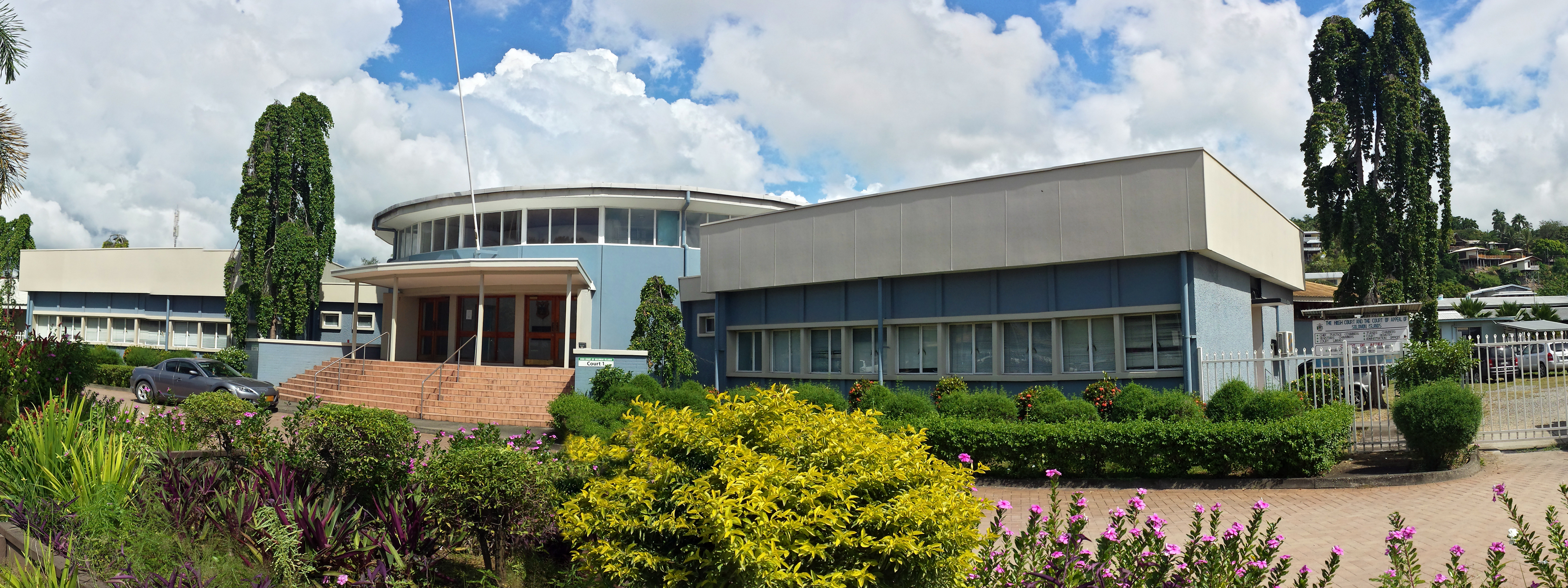
Solomon Islands High Court in Honiara

== High Court of Solomon Islands ==
The High Court has "unlimited original civil and criminal jurisdiction" (in more serious cases), and appellate jurisdiction, hearing appeals from the magistrates' courts and from the Customary Land Appeal Court (on points of law only for the latter). The High Court's rulings on appeal from the Customary Land Appeal Court are final. Other High Court rulings are subject to appeal to the Court of Appeal.

The court is presided by the Chief Justice, and is composed of puisne judges. As of 2013, the Chief Justice is Sir Albert Palmer.

== Gallery ==
Photos of Town Ground
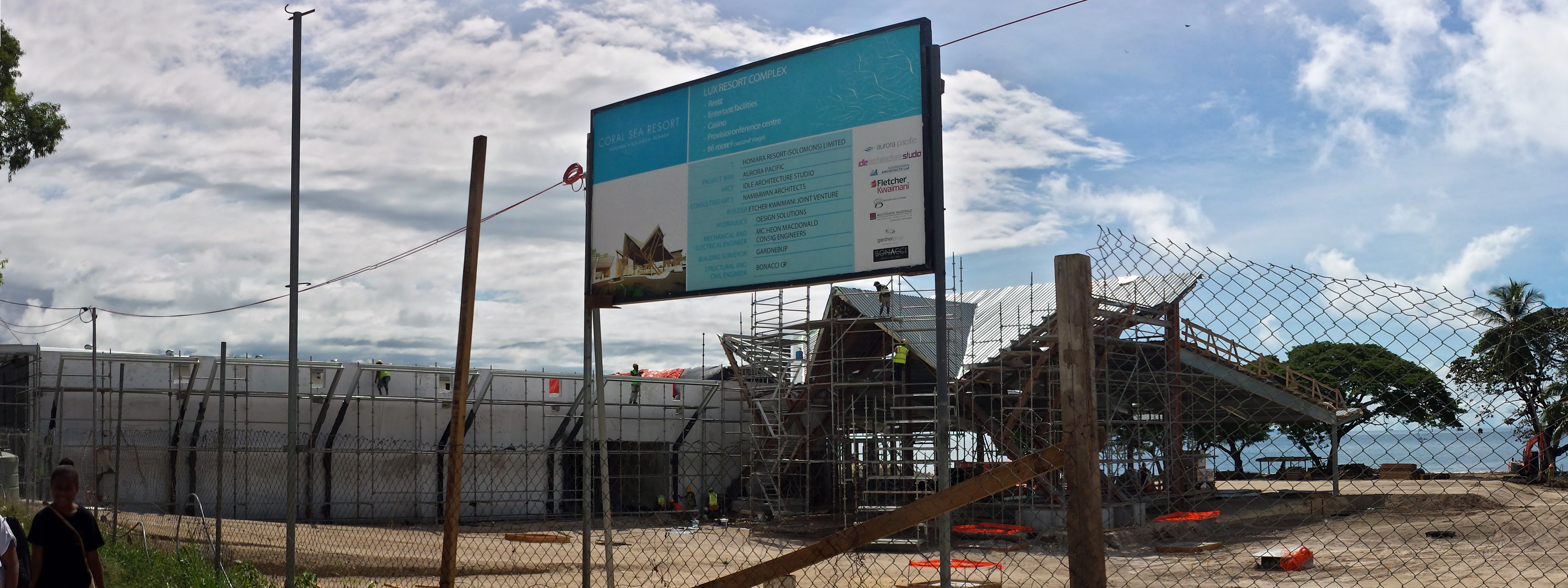
Building site of new Coral Sea Resort.

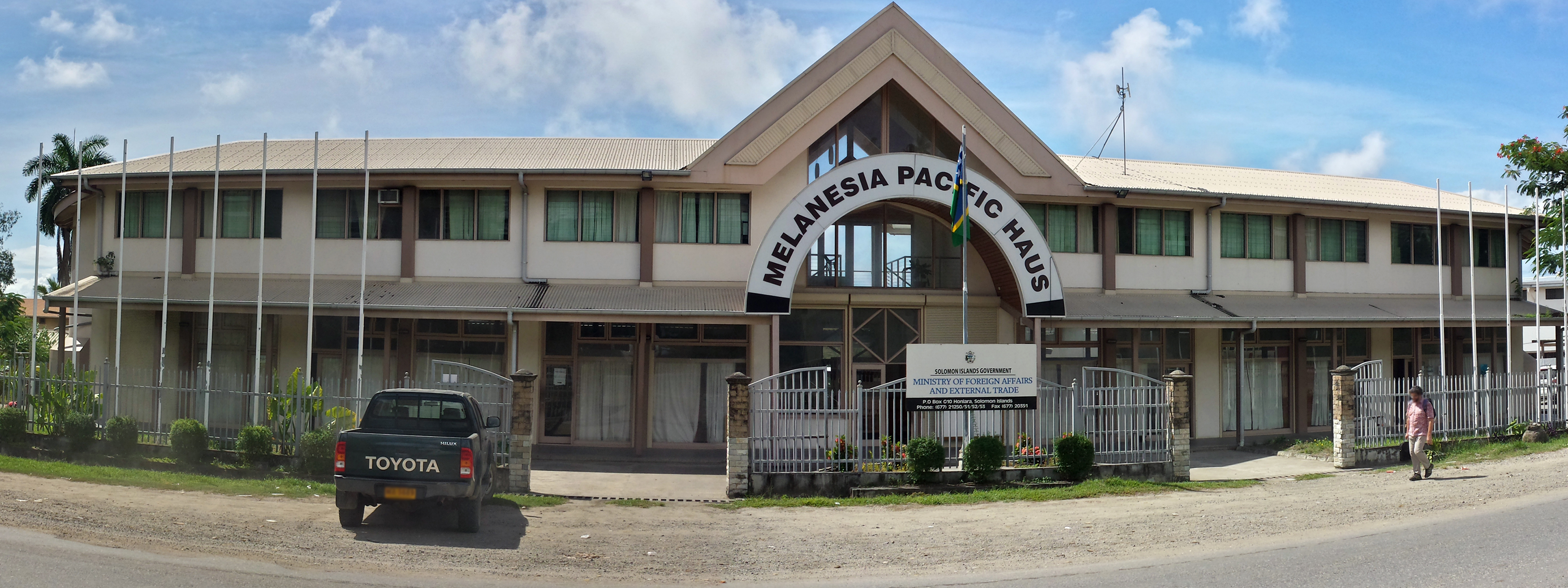
Melanesia Pacific House and Department of Foreign Affairs Honiara.

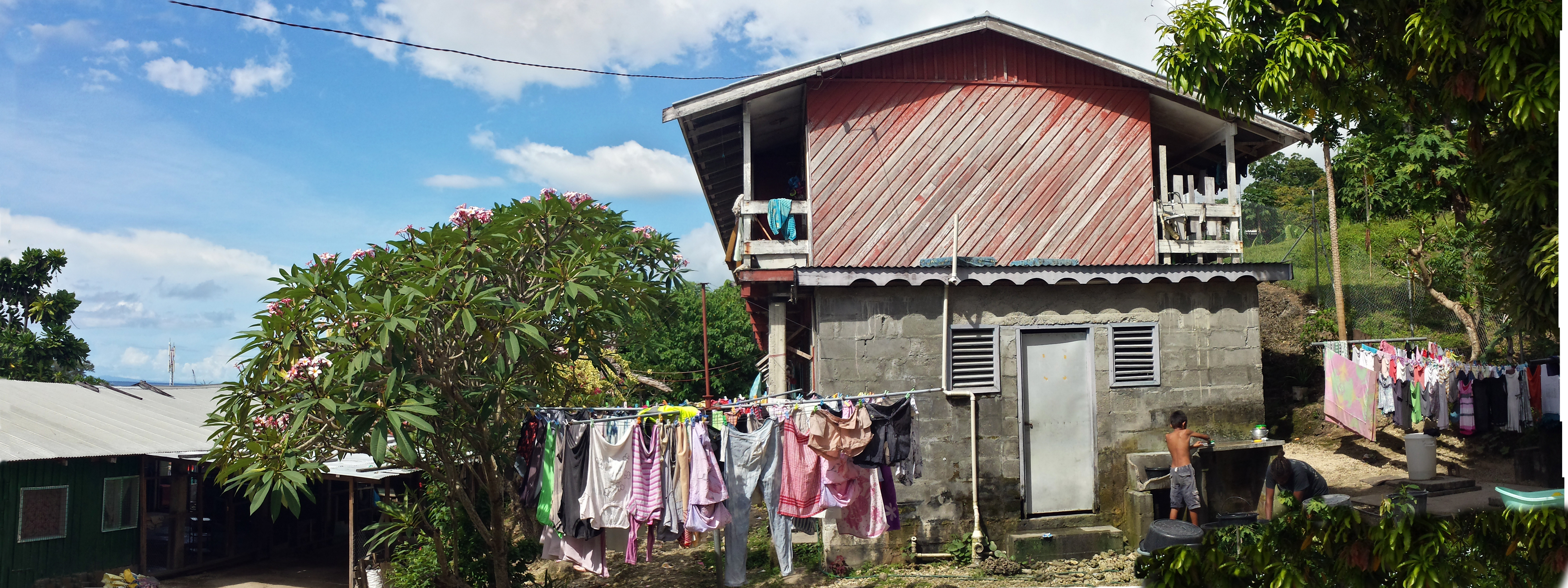
Tropic Motel off Lengakiki Road in Honiara.

== See also ==
- Iron Bottom Sound Hotel Video
- Middleton Band performing at Iron Bottom Sound Hotel video
- Iron Bottom Sound Facebook Page
- High Court Solomon Islands Facebook Page
