= International rugby league in 2012 =

This is a list of international rugby league matches played throughout 2012. A † denotes a recognised, but unofficial match that did not contribute to the IRL World Rankings.

== April ==
=== Anzac Test ===
20 April 2012
8:00pm (BST)

Australia	20 – 12	New Zealand
Tries; Johnathan Thurston (21') 1 Greg Inglis (26') 1 Cameron Smith (69') 1 Goals; Johnathan Thurston 4/4 (22', 27', 40' pen, 71')	Report	Tries; 1 (12') Issac Luke; 1 (48') Shaun Johnson; Goals; 2/2 (13', 48') Benji Marshall

Eden Park, Auckland
Attendance: 35,399
Referee: Richard Silverwood (England)
Player of the Match: Johnathan Thurston

== May ==
=== European Shield ===
2012-05-12

Germany	25-24	Serbia
Tries: Koch (18), Marin (27, 63), Danzey (43), Isaak (55); Goals: K. Keinhorst 2/5; Drop Goal: K. Keinhorst	(Report)	Tries: Stevanović (33, 49), S. Nikolić (59), Ćalić (65); Goals: Zogović 4/4

Fritz-Grunebaum-Sportpark, Heidelberg

2012-05-19

Germany	26-32	Russia
Tries: J. Keinhorst (37, 47, 71), Amefia (65), Danzey (68); Goals: J. Keinhorst 2/4, Danzey 1/1	(Report)	Tries: Bulanov (9, 30), Chuprin (18, 21, 56), Volkov (53); Goals: Lysokon 4/6

Fritz-Grunebaum-Sportpark, Heidelberg

2012-06-09

Serbia	24-18	Italy
Tries: Unković (21), Nedeljković (43), Živanović (52), Delić (65), Božović (69); Goals: Vukanović 2/5; Drop Goals: Vukanović 0/1	(Report)	Tries: Lenarduzzi (18), Barani (28), Cardella (47); Goals: Fontana 2/2, Peens 1/1

Makiš stadium, Belgrade
Attendance: 600

2012-07-07

Italy	72-10	Germany
Tries: Rancati (1), Barani (5), Marchesi (19), Fontana (24,29), De Mayer (27), Peens (39), Cardella (42), Prizzon (57), Alfonsi (62), Muyodi (67), Ciaurro (76); Goals: Peens 10/10, Fontana 2/2	(Report)	Tries: N. Keinhorst (18), Lortz (70) ; Goals: McLean 1/2

Stadio Beltrametti, Piacenza

2012-08-08

Russia	32-18	Italy
Tries: Gaponov (36), Botnarash (55, 72), Ososkov (58, 60), Mikhailov (69); Goals: Lysokon 4/6	(Report)	Tries: Ciaurro (11, 30), Esposito (47); Goals: Peens 3/3

Nara Stadium, Naro-Fominsk

2012-09-22

Russia	21-20	Serbia
Tries: Botnarash (20), Gaponov (32), Chuprin (52), Bratko (66); Goals: Lysokon 2/4; Drop Goal: Ososkov	(Report)	Tries: Stevanovic (12, 46), Bozovic (57), Bozic (69); Goals: Vukanovic 2/5

Nara Stadium, Naro-Fominsk

2013-05-18

Serbia	46-10	Germany
Tries: Nedeljković (5, 29, 49), Vojislav Dedić (18), Stevanović (60, 77), Tajsić (69), Ćalić (72); Goals: Zogović 7/9	(Report)	Tries: Moate (12), Amefia (34); Goals: K. Keinhorst 1/5

Makiš Stadium, Belgrade

2013-05-25

Serbia	10-24	Russia
Tries: Zogović (39), Stevanović (65); Goals: Zogović 1/2	(Report)	Tries: Konstantinov (21, 47), Lysokon (55, 74); Goals: Ososkov 3/3, Lysokon 1/1

Makiš Stadium, Belgrade

2013-06-29

Italy	38-18	Russia
Tries: Fontana (4), Ilinca (9), Saltonstall (20), Celerino (25), Vitalini (29), De Meyer (33), Nasso (63); Goals: Fontana 2, Peens 3	(Report)	Tries: Ososkov (46), Grigorev (56), Lysokon (69); Goals: Lysokon 3

Stadio Augusteo, Este

2013-07-27

Germany	30-66	Italy
Tries: Hoggins (4), Fehlemann (23), Keinhorst (42), Lortz (62), Améfia (72,79); Goals: Keinhorst 3/6	(Report)	Tries: Franchi (8, 36), Miranda (12), Celerino (18), Lepori (20, 39, 66), Barani (28), Pavoni (45), Bradley (51), Saltonstall (69), Ciaurro (75); Goals: Peens 3/3, Bradley 6/9

Nordstern Stadion, Karlsruhe

2013-08-10

Russia	30-0	Germany
	(Report)

Nara Stadium, Naro-Fominsk

2013-09-14

Italy	32-20	Serbia
Tries: Calegari (6, 39), Celerino (24), Peens (45), Boscolo (58), Lepori (61); Goals: Fontana 1/2, Peens 3/4	(Report)	Tries: Cuk (19, 78), Stevanović (36,48); Goals: Vojislav Dedić 2/3, Vukanovic 0/1

Stadio Augusteo, Este

== June ==
=== International Origin ===
16 June 2012

England	18 – 10	Exiles
Tries: Hock, Tickle, S.Tomkins; Goals: Sinfield 3/3	(Report)	Tries: Meli, Millard; Goals: Dureau 1/2

Langtree Park, St. Helens, England
Attendance: 11,083
Referee: Ben Thaler
Player of the Match: James Roby (England)

4 July 2012

England	20 – 32	Exiles
Tries: Atkins, Charnley, Briscoe, Cudjoe; Goals: Brough 2/4	(Report)	Tries: Hodsgon (2), Dureau, Monaghan, Meli (2); Goals: Hodgson 4/6

Kirklees Stadium, Huddersfield, England
Attendance: 7,865
Referee: Ben Thaler
Player of the Match: Daniel Holdsworth (Exiles)

== July ==
=== European Bowl ===
14 July 2012

Czech Republic	42–16	Hungary
	(Report)

, Vrchlabí

== October ==
=== Fiji vs Lebanon ===
19 October 2012

Fiji	4 – 34	Lebanon

Sydney
Attendance: 26,497

=== Australia vs New Zealand ===
13 October 2012

Australia	18 – 10	New Zealand

Willows Sports Complex, Townsville

=== Autumn International Series ===
20 October 2012

France	20–6	Wales
Tries: Bemba, Stacul, Bosc; Goals: Bosc 4/4	Report	Tries: D. James; Goals: Seamark 1/1

Stade Félix Bollaert, Lens
Attendance: 11,278
Player of the Match: Thomas Bosc (France)

27 October 2012

Wales	12–80	England
Tries: Roets, Fleming; Goals: Seamark 2/2		Tries: Hall (2), Charnley (4), Hardaker (2), Watkins, Ellis, Burrow, Cudjoe (2), Jones-Buchanan; Goals: Sinfield 12/14

Racecourse Stadium, Wrexham
Attendance: 4,014
Referee: Thierry Alibert
Player of the Match: Kevin Sinfield (England)

3 November 2012

England	44–6	France
Tries: Watkins (3), Briscoe (2), Tomkins (2), Sinfield; Goals: Sinfield 6/8		Tries: Bentley; Goals: Bosc 1/1

MS3 Craven Park, Hull
Attendance: 7,173
Referee: Shane Rehm
Player of the Match: Gareth Hock (England)

=== European Cup ===
14 October 2012

Scotland	18–30	Ireland
Tries: Fisher, Stringer, Cockburn; Goals: Scott 3/3	Report	Tries: Bergin (2), Littler (2), Casey; Goals: Finn 5/6

Meggetland Stadium, Edinburgh
Attendance: 726
Referee: Ben Thaler

20 October 2012

Ireland	4–56	England Knights
Tries: O'Toole; Goals: Finn 0/1	Report	Tries: Broughton (2), Dixon, Turner, T. Burgess, Houghton, Gale, Lawrence, G. Burgess (2); Goals: Gale 8/10

Deramore Park, Belfast

28 October 2012

Scotland	24–62	England Knights
Tries: Stringer, Paterson, Phillips, Borthwick; Goals: Scott 4/4	Report	Tries: Sarginson (2), Evans (2), Broughton (2), Taylor (2), G. Burgess, Dixon, Turner; Goals: Turner 9/11

Meggetland Stadium, Edinburgh
