= Rugby league in the Cook Islands =

- Highest governing body: Cook Islands Rugby League (CIRL)
- Nicknames: The Kukis
- First organised play: 1980 (domestic), 1986 (international)
- Registered players: Not specified
- Clubs: 7 men's teams, 4 women's teams (as of 2023)

Characteristics
- Contact: Yes
- Team members: 13 per side
- Mixed-sex: Yes, but usually in separate leagues/divisions
- Type: Outdoor, field
- Equipment: Rugby ball, protective gear
- Venue: Rugby league fields
- Glossary: Glossary of rugby league terms

Presence
- Country or region: Polynesia
- Olympic: No
- World Championships: Cook Islands national rugby league team
- Paralympic: No
- World Games: No

Rugby league is the national sport of the Cook Islands.

== Popularity ==
=== History ===
Officially the club rugby league competition commenced in 1980. The first international match was played against Niue at the 1986 Pacific Cup, which was hosted in Rarotonga and also included teams from Samoa, Tonga, NZ Maori and Tokelau. In the mid 1990s rugby league received significant funding through the SuperLeague organisation. Traditionally, much of the rugby league played by Cook Islanders has been in Australia and New Zealand where there are strong Cook Island populations.

In more recent times, Cook Islands rugby league has received a major boost through the involvement of former professional rugby league players Kevin Iro and Matt Rua - both native Cook Islanders - in the form of selector and defensive coach for the national side. Both players represented New Zealand internationally and played many NRL games.

Rugby league is the national sport and the most popular sport in the Cook Islands.

== Staff ==
- President, Cook Islands Rugby League: Charles Carlson
- Selectors: Kevin Iro, Charles Carlson, Ina Konito and No'ora Samuela
- RLIF Representative: Kevin Iro
- Head Coach: Tony Iro
- Defensive Coach: Matt Rua
- Attacking Coach: Kevin Iro

== Competition ==
The domestic Cook Islands rugby league competition begins in early February on a yearly basis. The Tournament is the biggest sporting competition in the Cook Islands with hundreds attending games on the Islands of Rarotonga and Aitutaki. Grand Final weekend builds the biggest hype among supporters of every team ranging from its junior levels, reserve grade and the main A grade (Premier level).

=== Men Teams ===
- Titikaveka Bulldogs
- Tupapa Maraerenga Panthers
- Avatiu/Nikao Eels
- Takuvaine Warriors
- Arorangi Bears
- Aitutaki Sharks (Premier Squad Only)
- Ngatangiia/Matavera Sea Eagles

=== Winners ===
- 1992 Ngatangiia/Matavera Sea Eagles
- 1993 Ngatangiia/Matavera Sea Eagles
- 1994 Ngatangiia/Matavera Sea Eagles
- 1995 Ngatangiia/Matavera Sea Eagles
- 1996 Ngatangiia/Matavera Sea Eagles
- 1997 Ngatangiia/Matavera Sea Eagles
- 1998 Ngatangiia/Matavera Sea Eagles
- 1999 Avatiu/Nikao Eels
- 2000 Ngatangiia/Matavera Sea Eagles
- 2001 Titikaveka Bulldogs
- 2002 Titikaveka Bulldogs
- 2003 Arorangi Bears
- 2004 Avatiu/Nikao Eels
- 2005 Tupapa Maraerenga Panthers
- 2006 Avatiu/Nikao Eels
- 2007 Avatiu/Nikao Eels
- 2008 Tupapa Maraerenga Panthers
- 2009 Tupapa Maraerenga Panthers
- 2010 Avatiu/Nikao Eels
- 2011 Avatiu/Nikao Eels
- 2012 Titikaveka Bulldogs
- 2013 Tupapa Maraerenga Panthers
- 2014 Tupapa Maraerenga Panthers
- 2015 Avatiu/Nikao Eels
- 2016 Avatiu/Nikao Eels
- 2017 Titivakeva Bulldogs
- 2018 Tupapa Maraerenga Panthers
- 2019 Ngatangiia/Matavera Sea Eagles
- 2020 (Season Suspended due to COVID) Ngatangiia/Matavera Sea Eagles retain Premiership
- 2021 Tupapa Maraerenga Panthers
- 2022 (Season Suspended due to COVID in the country) Tupapa Maraerenga Panthers retain Premiership
- 2023 Arorangi Bears
- 2024 Avatiu/Nikao Eels

=== Women's Teams ===
- Titikaveka Lady Bulldogs
- Tupapa Maraerenga Lady Panthers
- Avatiu/Nikao Lady Eels
- Arorangi Lady Bears

=== Winners ===
- 2021 Titikaveka Lady Bulldogs
- 2022 (Season Suspended due to COVID in the country) Titikaveka Lady Bulldogs retain Premiership
- 2023 Arorangi Lady Bears

== National teams ==
=== Other representative sides ===
In 2005 the Cook Islands Rugby League Avaiki XIII Tri Series was played between three Cook Island sides (Australian Cook Island Style, NZ Cooks and a Resident XIII). The winners of the series were the Australian Cook Islands Style team. This was used to select the national side that drew a three match series with the New Zealand Māori

==== Results ====
NZ Cooks v Resident XIII, 25 November 2005

Australian Cook Island Style 26 NZ Cooks 14

Australian Cook Island Style 24 Residents XIII 18, 18 November 2005 changed
