= Asia-Pacific Rugby League =

International sporting league

- Abbreviation: APRL
- Formation: 11 December 2011; 14 years ago
- Type: International sports federation
- Headquarters: Auckland, New Zealand
- Region served: Asia, Oceania, South Africa, and South America
- Members: 15
- Official language: English
- Chairman: Sandis Tsaka
- Parent organization: International Rugby League
- Website: www.asiapacificrl.com (not active)

The Asia-Pacific Rugby League (APRL) (previously Asia-Pacific Rugby League Confederation (APRLC)) is an umbrella body for nations playing the sport of rugby league football in Asia, Oceania, South Africa, and South America. The Confederation aims to act as a counterpart to the European Rugby League.

== History ==
The formation of the APRLC was agreed at the Rugby League International Federation's annual general meeting in May 2010. The Federation was established with 7 founding full members. The APRLC is based at the New Zealand Rugby League's Auckland headquarters and will focus much of its efforts on developing the sport in the Pacific Islands. Under the new RLIF constitution agreed in 2010, the APRLC may appoint a delegate to the five-person International Federation executive.

In 2011, the Asia-Pacific Rugby League Confederation met in a meeting in Auckland over December 5–6. At the meeting the chairman of the Fiji National Rugby League Peni Musunamasi has been elected as a director to represent the Asia Pacific region on the Rugby League International Federation which has been labelled a "significant milestone for the sport". Amongst many issues that were discussed at the two- day meeting was the application for membership of the federation from India, Philippines, Tahiti, Tokelau and American Samoa that shows the growing popularity of the sport in the region.

== APRL board ==
As of 10 April 2023

Member	Nationality
Sandis Tsaka (Chairman)	Papua New Guinea
Greg Peters (Vice-Chairman)	New Zealand
Jeremy Edwards (Secretary)	Australia
Peter Beattie	Australia
Frank Puletua	Australia
Charles Carlson	Cook Islands
Tagaloa Faafouina Su’a	Samoa
Viliame Naupoto	Fiji

== Members ==
=== Full members ===
Country	Founded	IRL affiliation	APRL affiliation
Australia	1907	1998	2010
Cook Islands	1995	1998	2010
Fiji	1992	1998	2010
New Zealand	1907	1998	2010
Papua New Guinea	1948	1998	2010
Samoa	1988	1998	2010
South Africa	1992	1998	2016
Tonga	1986	1998	2010

=== Affiliate members ===
Country	Founded	IRL affiliation	APRL affiliation
Brazil	2018	2019	2019
Chile	2015	2019	2019

=== Observer members ===
Country	Founded	IRL affiliation	APRL affiliation
Colombia	2016	2020	2020
Japan	1993	2021	2021
Philippines	2011	2021	2021
Solomon Islands	1999	2009	2010
Vanuatu	2011	2011	2011

== Official APRL Rankings ==
The Official Asia Pacific Rugby League Confederation Rankings are calculated on each nation’s performance over the current season and are influenced by a nation’s official RLIF ranking.

Influencers of position include:

- The result of the match i.e. win, lose or draw
- The margin of victory (or defeat)
- The relative strength of opposition faced
- The date of the match – more recent matches are weighted more heavily
- The importance of the match e.g. a World Cup match is given greater weighting than a standalone international.
- Official RLIF World Ranking

Rankings as of December 2018

Rank	Movement	Team
1	▲1	Australia
2	▼1	New Zealand
3	▲1	Tonga
4	▼1	Fiji
5	Steady	Samoa
6	Steady	Papua New Guinea
7	Steady	Cook Islands
8	▲3	Niue
9	▼1	Philippines
10	▼1	Vanuatu
11	▼1	Japan
12	Steady	Solomon Islands
Unranked	Steady	Thailand
Unranked	Steady	American Samoa
Unranked	Steady	Tokelau

== Asia Pacific Rugby League World Cup results ==
=== Men's ===
Team	1954	1957	1960	1968	1970	1972	1975	1977	1985-88	1989-92	1995	2000	2008	2013	2017	2021
Australia	Group Stage	1st	2nd	1st	1st	2nd	1st	1st	1st	1st	1st	1st	2nd	1st	1st	1st
Chile	-	-	-	-	-	-	-	-	-	-	-	-	-	-	-	DNQ
Cook Islands	-	-	-	-	-	-	-	-	-	-	-	Group Stage	DNQ	Group Stage	DNQ	Group Stage
Fiji	-	-	-	-	-	-	-	-	-	-	Group Stage	Group Stage	SF	SF	SF	QF
Japan	-	-	-	-	-	-	-	-	-	-	-	DNQ	DNQ	-	-	-
New Zealand	Group Stage	Group Stage	Group Stage	Group Stage	Group Stage	Group Stage	Group Stage	Group Stage	2nd	Group Stage	SF	2nd	1st	2nd	QF	SF
Papua New Guinea	-	-	-	-	-	-	-	-	Group Stage	Group Stage	Group Stage	QF	Group Stage	Group Stage	QF	QF
Samoa	-	-	-	-	-	-	-	-	-	-	Group Stage	QF	Group Stage	QF	QF	2nd
South Africa	-	-	-	-	-	-	-	-	-	-	Group Stage	Group Stage	DNQ	DNQ	DNQ	DNQ
Tonga	-	-	-	-	-	-	-	-	-	-	Group Stage	Group Stage	Group Stage	Group Stage	SF	QF

=== Women's ===
Team	2000	2003	2008	2013	2017	2021
Australia	Group Stage	SF	2nd	1st	1st	1st
Brazil	-	-	-	-	-	Group Stage
Cook Islands	-	Plate Runners Up	-	-	Group Stage	Group Stage
New Zealand	1st	1st	1st	2nd	2nd	2nd
Papua New Guinea	-	-	-	-	Group Stage	SF
Samoa	-	Plate Winner	Group Stage	-	-	-
Tonga	-	Bowl Runners Up	Group Stage	-	-	-

== See also ==
- International Rugby League
- European Rugby League
