= Papua New Guinea Rugby Football League =

- Papua Niugini Ragbi Futbol Lig
- Founded: 1949
- IRL affiliation: 1974 (Test nation)
- APRL affiliation: 2010 (full; founder)
- Responsibility: Papua New Guinea
- Headquarters: Port Moresby
- Key people: Reatau Rau (Chief Executive)
- Men's coach: Michael Marum
- Women's coach: Nigel Hukula

(Papua New Guinea)
- As of 25 June 2019

The Papua New Guinea Rugby Football League Inc. is the governing body for rugby league in Papua New Guinea. They are based in the capital Port Moresby.

== History ==
They were founded in 1949 and have been members of the Rugby League International Federation since 1974.

Along with the governing bodies of Tonga, Samoa, Fiji and the Cook Islands, they founded the Asia-Pacific Rugby League Confederation in December 2009.

== See also ==
- Papua New Guinea National Rugby League
