= International Rugby League =

International governing body of rugby league and its variants

- Formation: 1927; 99 years ago (as the Rugby League Imperial Board)
- Type: International sports federation
- Headquarters: London, England
- Region served: Worldwide
- Members: 15 full members 19 associated members
- Official languages: English; French
- Chairman: Troy Grant
- Deputy Chairman: Peter Beattie
- Website: InternationalRugbyLeague.com
- Formerly called: Rugby League Imperial Board (1927–1947); International Rugby League Board (1948–1998); Rugby League International Federation (1998–2019)

The International Rugby League (IRL) is the global governing body for the sport of rugby league football. The IRL organises the Rugby League World Cup, the oldest international rugby World Cup, as well as the Women's and Wheelchair equivalent.

International Rugby Leagues headquarters are in London, England and is currently made of 32 members.

Founded as the Rugby League Imperial Board in 1927 by the Rugby Football League, French Rugby League Federation, Australian Rugby League Board of Control and the New Zealand Rugby League. In 1948 it became the International Rugby League Board when its membership expanded and then the Rugby League International Federation between 1998 and 2019.

There are two regional associations affiliated to the IRL; the European Rugby League (ERL) and the Asia-Pacific Rugby League (APRL).

== History ==
=== 1895–1926: Rugby league foundations ===
Rugby league, which had started in England in 1895 and spread to Wales in 1907 and Australia and New Zealand in 1908, was introduced into France in 1934 after their rugby union side was banned from the International Rugby Board (now World Rugby) for both breaching amateur regulations and for constant foul play on the field.

=== 1927–1947: Imperial Rugby League Board ===
The Imperial Rugby League Board was formed in 1927. The Rugby Football League's authority in the sport was supported by having a majority of the representatives on the Board. The RFL had three representatives while Australia and New Zealand each had one. According to Collins (2000), the imbalanced voting rights were a result of the RFL being the representative for the "mother country" and the other members being keen to demonstrate their loyalty to the Crown.

In 1935 the French Rugby League proposed the constitution of an international board for rugby league, but the Australians were not favourable, and the idea was abandoned for a while.

=== 1948–1997: International Rugby League Board ===
The Board was formed on 25 January 1948 in Bordeaux, France at the impetus of the French, led by Paul Barrière. The Fédération Française de Rugby à XIII, New Zealand Rugby League and Britain's Rugby Football League met during the 1947–48 Kiwi tour of Europe and these three governing bodies agreed to form the International Rugby League Board (IRLB). At the meeting, it was decided that initially the RFL would oversee the sport's rules while the IRLB developed. The Australian Rugby League joined the IRLB some months later.

Over the next few years the IRLB held meetings with the outcomes forming the Rugby League World Cup which made its début in 1954.

In the view of Harry Edgar, from the Board's establishment "until his death in 1986, Bill Fallowfield was a dominant figure in its activities. Always a keen student of the rules of the game, [Fallowfield], like Australia's Tom Bellew in more recent times, strove to establish uniformity in the rules between all nations".

Former RFL Chief Executive David Oxley, an attendee of International Board meetings for close to 20 years, confirmed that proceedings were not dominated by the Australians: "Despite their dominance of the game on the field, the Aussies did not get everything their own way on the old Board because frequently the New Zealanders were at loggerheads with them. The Kiwis would vote against the Aussies, and France would vote with Great Britain, leaving Papua New Guinea as Australia's only guaranteed supporter."

Oxley reveals, "a lot of the really positive things were initiated by the British - certainly on rule changes, and the move to actually expand the role of the Board." Oxley states: "it was a British idea to introduce the levy on all Test match receipts to go into an international development fund. It was only 2 percent, but it did apply to television broadcast fees as well as gate receipts, so it built up into sizeable amounts, and it was that fund that paid for all we did in Russia, South Africa and the fine work done by Bob Abbott in the South Pacific, plus a significant part of the Student World Cup."

Oxley says that Kevin Humphries may have dominated for the Australians for a time but that was due to his personality. At that time the Board's role was mostly restricted to discussion of rule changes. Oxley states that it was the British who "established the procedure that the Board should meet on a more regular basis - at least once a year - and should look at ways of helping the expansion of the game."

After 1948, when only four sanctioned international teams being overseen by the IRLB and competing in annual competition, the IRLB grew to see twelve full member nations join the federation along with around thirty member nations and countless affiliates.

In 1954, the Rugby League World Cup, the first for either code of rugby, was formed at the instigation of the French.

In 1966, the International Board introduced a rule ending unlimited tackles and instead allowing the team in possession three play-the-balls followed by forming a scrum on the fourth tackle. This was increased to six tackles in 1972 and in 1983 the scrum was replaced by a handover.

The Australians had always been strong in supporting expansion of the game including places such as "South Africa, America and Canada". The Australians even took a lead role in aiding the game in France, in what might be considered the British sphere of influence, the ARL funded Tas Baitieri in a Development Officer position and they also provided coaching and player assistance and continued to have the Kangaroos tour France despite the costs.

After the Australian Rugby League introduced the World Sevens in 1988, the International Board took a much more active part in worldwide developments. Harry Edgar states: "Much of the successful participation in the 1995 World Cup came as a direct result of the ARL's World Sevens tournament"; "the game in Fiji was launched solely because of [the] World Sevens."

Some nations were introduced to international rugby league through the British Amateur Rugby League Association (BARLA). The RFL would often feel embarrassment at meetings when they "could claim to have done so little" while BARLA was praised by other attendees.

Maurice Lindsay has been credited with ensuring the 10-team 1995 World Cup was accompanied by an Emerging Nations tournament of seven teams, supporting international growth.

The 1995 World Cup was the "swansong of the original Board". With the Super League war started, the Board held what would be their last meeting immediately before that tournament, it ended "acrimoniously" as every member nation except Australia "stated their intention to withdraw their membership" and to establish the Super League International Board (SLIB) to govern Super League worldwide. The agreements that the former IRLB members signed with Super League had the effect of "usurping" the international board's control and diminishing the influence of its director-general, the Australian Rugby League's chairman, Ken Arthurson. The agreements removed international playing opposition for the Australian Rugby League's representative sides.

The SLIB gave its Pacific island members full voting rights in a display of its democratic values towards the game, although some were sceptical that the representatives of the powerful richer nations would allow themselves to be overruled. The Pacific island nations were only associate members of the IRLB with only the full members Australia, Great Britain, France, New Zealand and Papua New Guinea having a vote.

=== 1998–2019: Rugby League International Federation ===
In 1998, the Super League International Board was disestablished and replaced by a new organisation, the Rugby League International Federation, as the Super League war ended in Australia and international rugby league reunited. The replacement saw worldwide governance of rugby league handed back to the sport's national governing bodies.

The meeting in Sydney at which it was agreed to form the RLIF was held at the request of the Australian and New Zealand Rugby Leagues. Britain was represented by the Rugby Football League, rather than Super League (Europe), the company formed by its leading clubs.

John McDonald, chair of the Australian Rugby League, became chair of the RLIF. Maurice Lindsay, the chairman of the Super League International Board (SLIB), was bypassed after he had suggested that the SLIB, with him leading it, should carry on the governance of the international game. Lindsay's candidature was weak due to his role in the Super League war. The cessation of Super League operations in Australasia and the notice that had been given of the SLIB's intention to cease funding the sport in the Pacific islands, meant the SLIB could be left with only Britain left as a member. The French were happy to cut ties with SLIB and join the new Federation as, allegedly, "they never saw a penny of the £1 million they believed they had been promised to sign up with Super League".

In 1998, there was regret that rugby league had been so badly damaged, Harry Edgar, a rugby league writer, warned, "there can be no place for politics or individuals seeking personal glorification" as the "international game picks up the pieces after three years of bitter fall-out".

The RLIF's scheduling of competitions made shortly after its formation, specifically the timing of world cups, was criticised by Graham Clay, editor of Open Rugby magazine for opting for a four-yearly cycle beginning in 2002 that would mean rugby league facing strong competition from other major sporting events for corporate sponsorship. During the build-up to the 2008 World Cup, which had been timed to coincide with Australia's Centenary of Rugby League celebrations, it was stated and confirmed afterwards that the following tournament in the United Kingdom would be held in 2013 to avoid the 2012 Summer Olympics in London and that subsequent World Cups would be contested on a four-year cycle.

The absence of a formal schedule of international competition has been criticised as leaving the sport "weak in international development, and in finances to help the game survive and grow outside the UK and Australia". Some moves have been made to correct this though, with the RFL's Richard Lewis proposing a ten-year international plan in 2007.

In 2009 the member nations agreed that the RLIF should negotiate over sponsorship, licensing and broadcast rights for international rugby league rather than the member nations.

As of 2009, the RLIF imposed a levy of 10% on net gate receipts at all international matches, providing the International Federation with revenues. The RLIF makes grants to member nations to help foster the game but the effectiveness of these has been questioned.

The Pacific Rim nations of Papua New Guinea, Tonga, Samoa, Fiji and the Cook Islands united to form the Pacific Islands Rugby League Federation (PIRLF) in December 2009.

However, PIRLF was not formally recognised by the RLIF, as consideration was being given to modernising the RLIF constitution and membership structure. The Wales Rugby League were granted full membership of the RLIF in 2010 at a meeting in Melbourne, Australia.

At a special general meeting held in Auckland, New Zealand, in November 2010, a new constitution was approved that gave New Zealand, Australia and England permanent seats on the RLIF board, with provision made for an additional seat each by May 2011 for the RLEF and a soon-to-be-formed Asia-Pacific Rugby League Confederation (APRLC), once RLEF and APRLC were granted Associate Membership status by the RLIF.

The APRLC was incorporated in April 2011 with member nations New Zealand, Australia, Papua New Guinea, Tonga, Samoa, Fiji and the Cook Islands.

Scotland and Ireland were each granted full membership of the RLIF, and the RLEF and APRLC Associate Membership, at the annual general meeting held in Auckland, New Zealand, in May 2011. A new Chairman, Scott Carter was also elected, becoming the first Kiwi to hold the role. This prompted a walkout by the Rugby Football League's Richard Lewis who believed he should have succeeded Australia's Colin Love.

Serbia and Lebanon were each granted full membership of the RLIF at the annual general meeting held in Manchester, England in May 2012. Ukraine, Russia and Jamaica were granted full membership in 2013.

Nigel Wood was elected as Chairman in 2014 following and oversaw reforms, including the appointment of the first full-time CEO, former England and Wales Cricket Board CEO David Collier. In February 2018, John Grant was appointed as the new Chairman of the RLIF

=== 2019–present: International Rugby League ===
On 14 October 2019, the RLIF board voted to officially change its name to International Rugby League with the change taking effect the next day.

After the 2022 Russian invasion of Ukraine, the International Rugby League and European Rugby League banned Russia from all international rugby league competitions.

During the 2021 Rugby League World Cup, IRL chairman Troy Grant announced that he was pushing for a nines tournament to be introduced to the Summer Olympics by Brisbane 2032 as well as a wheelchair tournament to be introduced to the Paralympics.

In March 2024, the IRL downgraded Ireland, Italy, Lebanon, Russia, and Scotland from full to affiliate members due to noncompliance with the full membership criteria; Russia remained suspended. Belgium, Denmark, Latvia, Ethiopia, Saudi Arabia, and Trinidad and Tobago were expelled due to inactivity. The federations of Argentina and Spain were admitted as observers.

== Board of Directors ==
As of 10 April 2024

Under the International Rugby League Constitution, the Board of Directors consists of 8 members from pre-defined representative nominations. A restructure, which came into effect on 10 April 2025, reduced the board from 12 members to 8 in order to increase the ratio of independent directors.

Member	Represention	Nationality
Troy Grant (Chairman)	Independent Directors	Australia
Emma Young	Independent Directors	England
Laurie Daley	Independent Directors	Australia
Peter V'landys	Representative of the Australian Rugby League Commission	Australia
Simon Johnson	Representative of the Rugby Football League	England
Justin Leydesdorff	Representative of the New Zealand Rugby League	New Zealand
Sandis Tsaka	Representative of the Asia-Pacific Rugby League	Papua New Guinea
Dean Andrew (Deputy Chairman)	Representative of the European Rugby League	England; Germany

== Member nations ==
The International Rugby League was founded in its current form in 1998 by ten national governing bodies:

- (Australia) Australian Rugby League Commission
- Cook Islands Rugby League
- (England) Rugby Football League
- Fiji National Rugby League
- (France) French Rugby League Federation
- New Zealand Rugby League
- Papua New Guinea Rugby Football League
- Rugby League Samoa
- (South Africa) South African Rugby League (Note: South Africa was removed as a full member in 2026)
- Tonga National Rugby League / Tonga Rugby League XIII (Note: Tonga National Rugby League were expelled in 2020 and Tonga Rugby League XIII were admitted as the new governing body for Tonga in 2024)

At present, a further six national governing bodies have become full members:

- Wales Rugby League (2010)
- (Serbia) Serbian Rugby League (2012)
- Jamaica Rugby League Association (2013)
- (Ukraine) Ukrainian Federation of Rugby League (2013)
- Rugby League Federation Ghana (2025)
- Kenya Rugby League (2026)

== Laws of the game ==
The laws of rugby league have been the responsibility of the RLIF since its formation in 1998. Before that the Rugby Football League and IRLB, after its inception in 1948, were the bodies that maintained the Laws.

The International Federation in conjunction with the nations governing bodies (mainly the Australian Rugby League, Fédération Française de Rugby à XIII, New Zealand Rugby League and the Rugby Football League) often meet on a semi-regular basis of up to four times per year to make changes or decide new rules; although all test playing nations have a say in the altering of the rules and laws of rugby league.

== International eligibility ==
The RLIF reiterated in 2008 that a player may represent a country if it is the country of their parents or if that country has been the player's "principal country of residence" for three years up until the date of the player's selection. A player may also be selected for country that they have represented in international rugby league in any age level before the 1998 introduction of the RLIF's constitution, or a country which the player has represented in a senior international competition in any other sport.

In 2009, international qualification regulations were modified in response to dissatisfaction about players representing different nations too easily. Players who have represented one country in World Cup qualifiers would now "not be permitted" to play for a different one in the World Cup tournament. The rule change did not apply to players who had played for a country in a Test series or non-World Cup related tournament. Applications must still be made to the RLIF for those changes still permitted.

The rules were clarified in 2016 by introducing tiers which determine if and when a player can represent more than one country. The changes also increased the residence period from three years to five.

== Competitions ==
International Rugby League overseas international tournaments. Competitions within one of the four confederations (Americas Rugby League, Asia-Pacific Rugby League, European Rugby League, and Middle East Africa Rugby League) are usually not overseen by the IRL.

=== World Cup ===
The IRL is in charge of the Rugby League World Cup, first held in 1954 in France and the first competition to be officially known as the "Rugby World Cup". Since then the World Cup has been held a total of 16 times, with the most recent Cup being held in England in 2022. The IRL also sanctioned and has overseen the Women's Rugby League World Cup since its inception in 2000. The tournament is held in conjunction with the men's tournament, but will be a separate event from 2028.

=== Four Nations ===
The IRL also ran the Four Nations series between the Big Three powers, England, Australia and New Zealand and a fourth nation from either Europe or the South Pacific depending on where the competition was being played, as the hosts were alternate between England and Oceania. The final winner was Australia who won the 2016 series in England, prior to the competition's abolishment.

=== Emerging Nations Tournament ===
The Rugby League Emerging Nations Tournament is a tournament between affiliate members and nations with goals of growing the game of rugby league.

=== Future tournaments ===
The RLIF plan to introduce a Continental Cup that would be played every four years to replace the Four Nations.

== Recognitions and awards ==
The IRL presented several international awards annually, beginning in 2004 before the final edition in 2014.

In 2017, the Purchased the Golden Boot Award from League Publications Ltd..

== International rankings ==
The IRL publishes and maintains the rankings of the men's national rugby league teams. The concept was first launched in January 2007 following in the footsteps of the European Rankings published by the Rugby League European Federation.

The rankings are calculated based on an average of points accumulated by each Nation over a three-year cycle. Under the structure, matches deemed of higher importance such as World Cup games, Tri-Nations and other major tournament finals draw more points than mid-season Tests and other internationals. For each match that a nation participates they are given a base level of points. This base level is affected upon the type of match and the status of the opponent.

Bonus points are given for teams that reach certain milestones deemed of significant international importance including reaching a tournament final or qualifying for an event such as a World Cup.

From the total number of points that a nation will receive these points are then averaged to help give a more accurate view of the performance of a nation over the three-year cycle.

Nations which have played less than a certain number of matches deemed acceptable over a three-year cycle will be penalised under the current point structure.

== Overview by year ==
International Rugby League oversees every international test match. An overview of these matches can be found here:

2010s	2010	2011	2012	2013	2014	2015	2016	2017	2018	2019
2020s	2020	2021	2022	2023	2024	2025	2026	2027	2028	2029

== See also ==
- RLIF Awards
- RLIF World Rankings
- Asia-Pacific Rugby League
- European Rugby League
- Rugby League World Cup
- Rugby League Four Nations
- Tertiary Student Rugby League World Cup
- Women's Rugby League World Cup
- Wheelchair Rugby League World Cup
