= Geography of rugby league =

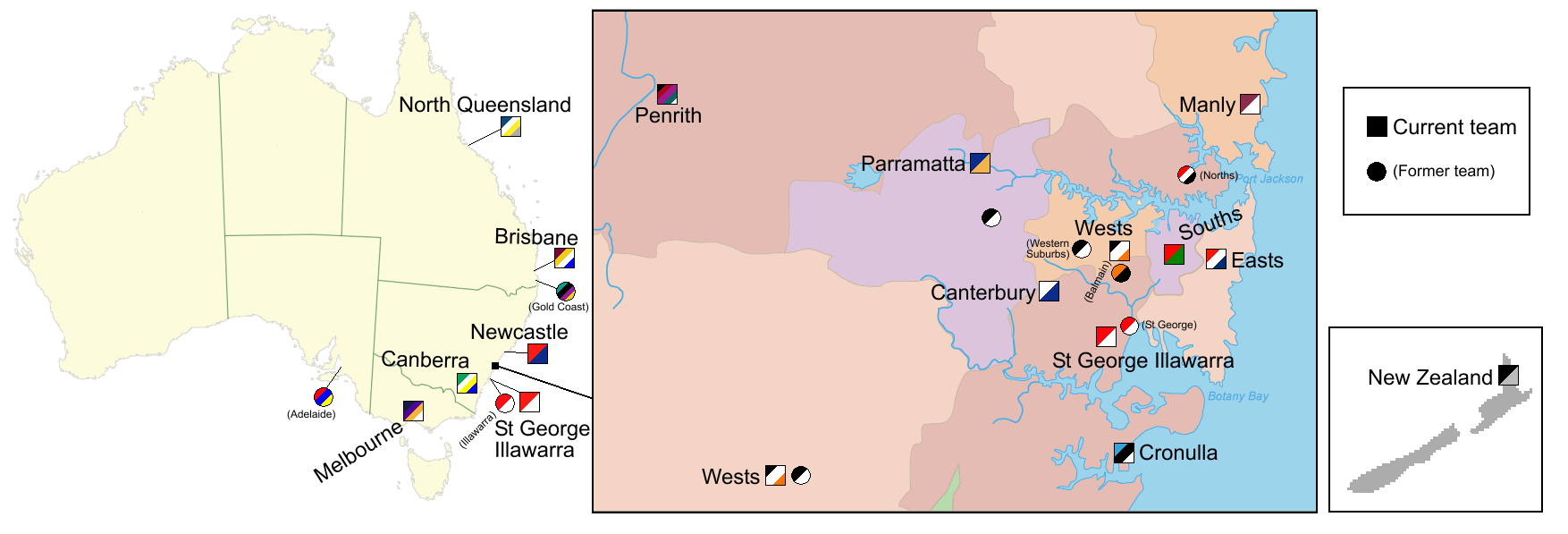
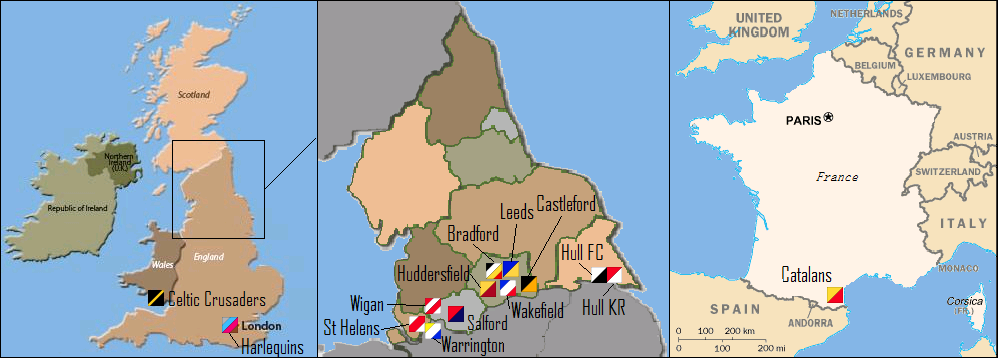
Map of domestic teams competing in the world's two most successful leagues - the NRL and Super League. (c. late 2000s)

Rugby league is a full contact football code and spectator sport played in various countries around the world. It is govererned globally by the International Rugby League (IRL; previously referred to as the Rugby League International Federation).

The IRL divides governance of the sport across two confederations governing Asia-Pacific (APRL) and Europe (ERL). The ERL further contains two sub-branches governing The Americas and Middle East and Africa.

Although one of the later football codes to be developed, the game has expanded outside of its traditionals heartlands in Australia, Northern England, Southern France, and New Zealand. As a result, many players of European, and Pacific Islander background have risen to the top professional level in the two major domestic leagues, the National Rugby League and Super League.

Whilst individual international test matches between nations have been staged regularly since 1907, the first world cup of the sport was held in France in 1954, making it the first world cup of either rugby code and the first to be officially known as the "Rugby World Cup".

Full and affiliate members are eligible for the Rugby League World Cup. However, due to the late rescheduling of the 2026 Rugby League World Cup, only full members will be allowed to compete in the next edition.

== Americas ==
Rugby league is a growing sport in the Americas, having first started with All Star exhibition matches in the 1950s. It has been played at an organised semi-professional level in North America since it was first introduced as a competition sport in the 1990s. There are currently domestic leagues operating in Jamaica, Canada and the United States. Many players of Caribbean heritage live and play in the Super League and have brought their skills back to the islands to foster the development of thousands of new players. The game is also played at a lower amateur level across the Americas by ex-patriates although only recognised national organisations are listed here for brevity.

Canada currently has two domestic competitions, Ontario and British Columbia, with British Columbia being the premier competition with also the most teams. British Columbia Rugby League (BCRL) also has a provincial team known as the BC Bulldogs. In 2012, the BC Bulldogs competed against Utah Avalanche from Salt Lake who currently play in the AMNRL. The game was contested over two legs, home and away, with BC taking both games. The BC Bulldogs also made an appearance at the Las Vegas Remembrance Cup and come third. Coogee Bay Dolphins from Australia took out the competition for the second time in a row.

In 2013, BCRL will be made up of 6 teams, namely Bayside Sharks, Kelowna Crows, Richmond Bears, Sea to Sky Eagles, Surrey Beavers and Vancouver Dragons.

Brazil has also taken up the sport in 2013.

Since 2013 the Latin Heat Rugby League has had moderate success in introducing rugby League to players with Latin American heritage living in Australia. In 2014 the Latin Heat opened a U.S chapter.

Country	Overview	National team	Status	Governing Body	Main league competition(s)	Best International Performance (Note: Position refers to the Rugby League World Cup unless stated otherwise.)
Argentina	Rugby league in Argentina	Penguins	Observer	Argentina Rugby XIII	In Development	
Brazil	Rugby league in Brazil	Carcarás (M) / Amazonas (W)	Affiliate	Brazil Rugby League Confederation	Premiership	
Canada	Rugby league in Canada	Wolverines (M) / Ravens (W)	Affiliate	Canada Rugby League	North American Rugby League	Emerging Nations' Fifth Place
Chile	Rugby league in Chile	Caciques	Observer	Chile Rugby League Federation	In development	
Colombia	Rugby league in Colombia	Hermanos Colombianos	Observer			
Ecuador	Rugby league in Ecuador	Ecuador XIII	Observer			
El Salvador	Rugby league in El Salvador	Trueno Azul	–	ESRL		
Jamaica	Rugby league in Jamaica	Reggae Warriors	Member	Jamaica Rugby League Association	Jamaica National League	Group Stages / 1× Americas Champion
Mexico	Rugby league in Mexico	Mexico	Observer			
Peru	Rugby league in Peru	Emperadores	Observer			
United States	Rugby league in the United States	Hawks	Affiliate	USARL	North American Rugby League	1× Quarter Finalists / Emerging Nations' Third Place / 2× Americas Champion
Uruguay	Rugby league in Uruguay	Gauchos	Observer			
West Indies	Rugby league in the West Indies	The Wahoos	Observer	West Indies Rugby League Federation		

== Asia-Pacific ==
Rugby league is a popular sport in Oceania and the Pacific islands. Australia, New Zealand and Papua New Guinea are the main nations playing rugby league in Oceania. The Cook Islands, Tonga, Samoa and Fiji are also RLIF test nations. Affiliate nations include Vanuatu, American Samoa, New Caledonia, Niue and Tokelau. The Solomon Islands also have some history of the sport.

Pacific

Country	Overview	National team	Status	Governing Body	Main league competition(s)	Best International Performance
Australia	Rugby league in Australia	Kangaroos	Member	Australian Rugby League	National Rugby League	Champions (1957, 1968, 1970, 1975, 1977, 1985–88, 1989–92, 1995, 2000, 2013, 2017, 2021) Runners-up (1960, 1972, 2008)
Cook Islands	Rugby league in the Cook Islands	Kukis	Member	Cook Islands Rugby League		Group Stages / Emerging Nations's Champions
Fiji	Rugby league in Fiji	Bati	Member	Fiji National Rugby League	Fiji National Rugby League Competition	3× Semi-finalists
New Zealand	Rugby league in New Zealand	Kiwis	Member	New Zealand Rugby League	National Competition	Champions (2008) Runners-up (1985–88, 2000, 2013)
Niue	Rugby league in Niue	The Rock	Observer			Emerging Nations' Runners-up
Norfolk Island	Rugby league in Norfolk Island	Pine Trees	Observer	Australian Rugby League Commission		
Papua New Guinea	Rugby league in Papua New Guinea	Kumuls	Member	Papua New Guinea Rugby Football League	Papua New Guinea National Rugby League	1× Semi-finalists
Solomon Islands	Rugby league in the Solomon Islands	Solies	–	Solomon Islands Rugby League Federation		
Samoa	Rugby league in Samoa	Toa Samoa	Member	Rugby League Samoa		Runners-up (2021)
Tonga	Rugby league in Tonga	Mate Ma'a Tonga	Member	Tonga National Rugby League	Tongan National Rugby League	1× Semi-finalists / Pacific Cup Runners-up
Vanuatu	Rugby league in Vanuatu	Vanuatu	Observer	Vanuatu Rugby League		

Asia

Country	Overview	National team	Status	Governing Body	Main league competition(s)	Best International Performance
China	Rugby league in China	China	Observer	China Rugby League		
Hong Kong	Rugby league in Hong Kong	Hong Kong	Observer			
Indonesia	Rugby league in Indonesia	Indonesia	Observer	Indonesia Rugby League	Bali 9's/West Papua	
Japan	Rugby league in Japan	Samurais	Observer	Japanese Rugby League Association	Japanese Rugby League	Emerging Nations's Sixth Place
Philippines	Rugby league in the Philippines	Tamaraws	Observer	Pambansang Ragbi Liga Ng Pilipinas	PNRL Shield	Asian Cup Champions (2012, 2013)
Thailand	Rugby league in Thailand	Thailand Stars	Observer	Thai Rugby League		Asian Cup Runners-up (2012, 2013)

== Europe ==
Europe is the birth place of rugby league with the game originating in Northern England. The sport is played at amateur level in most European countries although only England, Wales, and France have professional or semi-professional clubs. These three countries were the original members of the Rugby League European Championship.

The Great Britain national rugby league team is the most successful side having won three world cups, however since 1995 the team has split in favour of home nations national sides.

Domestically, the Super League (Great Britain) is the only professional league on the continent however the RFL Championship, RFL League 1, RFL Women's Super League (all Great Britain), and Elite One Championship, and Elite Two Championship (both France) are semi-professional to varying extents.

Country		Overview		National team		Status	Governing Body		Main league competition(s)	Best International Performance	
Albania		Rugby league in Albania		Albania		Observer					
Belgium		Rugby league in Belgium		Belgium		Observer					
Bosnia and Herzegovina		Rugby league in Bosnia and Herzegovina		Bosnia and Herzegovina		Observer					
Bulgaria		Rugby league in Bulgaria		Bulgaria		Observer					
Czech Republic		Rugby league in the Czech Republic		Czech Republic		Affiliated	Czech Rugby League Association			2× European C League Champion	
Denmark		Rugby league in Denmark		Denmark		Observer					
France		Rugby league in France		Chanticleers		Member	French Rugby League Federation		Elite One Championship; Elite Two Championship	Runners-up (1954, 1968) 9× European A League Champion	
Great Britain	England	Rugby league in the British Isles	in England	Lions	Lions	Member	Rugby Football League	Rugby Football League	Super League; Championship (Note: No Scottish teams compete in the British professional structure.)	Champions (1954, 1960, 1972) Runners-up (1957, 1970, 1977, 1989–92)	Runners-up (1975, 1995, 2017) 14× European A League Champion
Great Britain	Scotland	Rugby league in the British Isles	in Scotland	Lions	Bravehearts	Affiliate	Rugby Football League	Scotland Rugby League	Super League; Championship	Champions (1954, 1960, 1972) Runners-up (1957, 1970, 1977, 1989–92)	1× Quarter Finalists / 1× European A League Champion
Great Britain	Wales	Rugby league in the British Isles	in Wales	Lions	Dragons	Member	Rugby Football League	Wales Rugby League	Super League; Championship	Champions (1954, 1960, 1972) Runners-up (1957, 1970, 1977, 1989–92)	3× Semi-finalists / 7× European A League Champion
Germany		Rugby league in Germany		Germany		Affiliated	Nationaler Rugby League Deutschland			2× European B League Champion	
Georgia		Rugby league in Georgia		13 Georgians		Observer	Georgia Rugby League				
Greece		Rugby league in Greece		Titans		Affiliated	Greek Rugby League			Group Stages / Emerging Nations' Semi-finalists / 2× European C League Champion	
Hungary		Rugby league in Hungary		Hungary		Observer				Emerging Nations' Semi-finalists	
Ireland (Republic of Ireland and Northern Ireland)		Rugby league in Ireland		Wolfhounds		Affiliate	Rugby League Ireland		Irish Elite League	2× Quarter Finalists/Semi-final play-offs / Emerging Nations's Runners-up	
Italy		Rugby league in Italy		Azzurri		Affiliate	Federazione Italiana Rugby League			Group Stages / Emerging Nations's Runners-up / 2× European B League Champion	
Latvia		Rugby league in Latvia		Latvia		Observer				1× European C League Champion	
Malta		Rugby league in Malta		l-Kavallieri		Affiliated	Maltese Rugby League Association			Emerging Nations' Champion / 1× European C League Champion	
Norway		Rugby league in Norway		Vikings		Affiliated	The Norwegian Rugby Federation				
Poland		Rugby league in Poland		Poland		Observer	Polska Rugby XIII		Mistrzostwa Polski w rugby league	Emerging Nations' Trophy winners	
Russia		Rugby league in Russia		Bears		Affiliate	Russian Rugby League			Group Stages / 2× European B League Champion	
Serbia		Rugby league in Serbia		White Eagles		Member	Serbian Rugby League			2× European B League Champion	
Spain		Rugby league in Spain		Spain		Affiliated	Spanish Rugby League Association			1× European C League Champion	
Sweden		Rugby league in Sweden		Sweden		Observer					
Turkey		Rugby league in Turkey		Turkey		Affiliated	Turkish Rugby League Association				
Ukraine		Rugby league in Ukraine		Ukraine		Member	Ukrainian Federation of Rugby League			3× European C League Champion	

== Middle East-Africa ==
Rugby league is a growing sport in Africa and the Middle East, with a large growth in players since the 1990s, some of which have played at the game's elite levels in the National Rugby League and Super League. The game in the Middle East is one of the fastest growing sports with regular internationals played against European and Mediterranean teams.

Rugby league is a growing sport in Africa, with the game first introduced to the continent in the early 50s. The vast distance of teams from the game's heartlands has at times affected the development of the sport but new advances in the 21st century have seen a major increase in the number of internationals scheduled. Many high calibre players from the continent have progressed to the top club leagues, including Younes Khattabi, Jamal Fakir, Tom van Vollenhoven, Fred Griffiths and Jarrod Saffy. The large ex-patriate Moroccan population in the south of France has resulted in a growing interchange of players between the two countries. Rugby league in Africa is played in South Africa, Gambia, Morocco, Burundi, Nigeria and Ghana.

Country	Overview	National team	Status	Governing Body	Main league competition(s)	Best International Performance
Burundi	Rugby league in Burundi	Ama Suguru	Observer	Burundi Rugby League Association		
Cameroon	Rugby league in Cameroon	Cameroon	Observer			
(Democratic Republic of the Congo) DR Congo	Rugby league in DR Congo	DR Congo	Observer			
Ethiopia	Rugby league in Ethiopia	Ethiopia	Observer	Ethiopia Rugby League Association		
(The Gambia) Gambia	Rugby league in Gambia	Gambia	Observer			
Ghana	Rugby league in Ghana	Stars	Affiliate	Ghana Rugby League		
Lebanon	Rugby league in Lebanon	The Cedars	Affiliate	Lebanese Rugby League Federation	Bank of Beirut Championship	3× Quarter Finalists
Libya	Rugby league in Libya	Libya	Observer			
Morocco	Rugby league in Morocco	Maroc	Observer	Maroc Rugby League	Maroc University League	Emerging Nations's Fourth Place
Nigeria	Rugby league in Nigeria	Greens	Affiliate	Nigeria Rugby League		1× Africa and Middle East Champion
Pakistan	Rugby league in Pakistan	Pakistan	Observer			
Palestine	Rugby league in Palestine	Palestine	Observer			
Saudi Arabia	Rugby league in Saudi Arabia	KSA	Observer			
Sierra Leone	Rugby league in Sierra Leone	Sierra Leone	Observer			
South Africa	Rugby league in South Africa	The Rhinos	Member	South African Rugby League	Tom van Vollenhoven Cup	Group Stages / 2× Africa and Middle East Champion
South Sudan	Rugby league in South Sudan	South Sudan	Observer			
United Arab Emirates	Rugby league in UAE	Falcons	Observer	Emirates Rugby League		

== Non-IRL associated ==
Team	IRL associate	Overview	National team	Governing Body	Main league competition(s)
Australian Aboriginal	Australia		Indigenous All Stars		
New South Wales	Australia	Rugby league in New South Wales	Blues	New South Wales Rugby League	NSW Cup
Queensland	Australia	Rugby league in Queensland	Maroons	Queensland Rugby League	Queensland Cup
Victoria	Australia	Rugby league in Victoria			
Lancashire	Great Britain / England	Rugby league in Lancashire	Lancashire	Rugby Football League	RFL Lancashire League
Yorkshire	Great Britain / England	Rugby league in Yorkshire	Yorkshire	Rugby Football League	RFL Yorkshire League
Cumbria	Great Britain / England		Cumbria	Rugby Football League	
(Māori people) Māori	New Zealand		New Zealand Māori		
Tokelau	New Zealand	Rugby league in Tokelau	Tokelu	Tokelau Rugby League	
Catalonia	Spain	Rugby league in Catalonia	Catalonia	Associació Catalana de Rugby Lliga	

== See also ==
- List of international rugby league teams
- List of rugby league competitions
- List of rugby league tours
