= Ikram Butt =

England & Pakistan international rugby league footballer and RL administrator

Personal information
- Full name: Mohammed Ikram Butt
- Born: 25 October 1968 (age 57) Leeds, West Riding of Yorkshire, England

Playing information
- Position: Wing
Club
Years	Team	Pld	T	G	FG	P
1990	Leeds	0+1	0	0	0	0
1990–95	Featherstone Rovers	168	66	0	0	264
1995–96	London Broncos	21+1	4	0	0	16
1997	Huddersfield Giants	10	5	0	0	20
1998	Hunslet Hawks	9+1	1	0	0	4
	Total	211	76	0	0	304
Representative
Years	Team	Pld	T	G	FG	P
1995	England	1	0	0	0	0
2011	Pakistan	1	0	0	0	0

Ikram Butt (born 25 October 1968) is an English former professional rugby league footballer who played in the 1980s and 1990s. Of Pakistani descent, he was the first south Asian to play either code of international rugby for England in 1995. He played at representative level for England, and at club level for Featherstone Rovers, Leeds, London Broncos, Huddersfield Giants and Hunslet Hawks as a wing.

== Personal life ==
Ikram Butt was born in Leeds, West Riding of Yorkshire, on 25 October 1968. His father Mohammad Butt was a boxer for the Pakistan Air Force who taught his four sons to be involved in sports early on; he died when Butt was 12.

Whilst with the London Broncos, he was convicted of perverting the course of justice and spent three months in prison as a result of a driving misdemeanour.

He is the founder of the British Asian Rugby Association, and the British Pakistani rugby league team.

In 2002-3 Ikram joined grass-roots side Victoria Rangers ARLFC for three seasons. During this time he showed he hadn't lost any of his skill from his professional days, The main reason for joining the Vics was to link up with Nigel Goodings who had formed a successful team at Victoria Rangers.

In 2009 Ikram released an autobiography called Tries and Prejudice. The book has sold close to 1,000 copies with more still to be sold, he gave all the proceeds to charity. The book's foreword is written by Bollywood star Rahul Bose.

He currently works for Leeds Rugby as a Manager of the connecting communities project, as Sports Campaign Manager as a consultant for White Ribbon Campaign, and is vice president of "World Rugby League"

== Playing career ==
=== Club career ===
Butt made his début for Featherstone Rovers on Sunday 26 August 1990, and he played his last match for Featherstone Rovers during the 1994–95 season.

Butt played on the wing in Featherstone Rovers' 20-16 victory over Workington Town in the 1992–93 Division Two Premiership Final at Old Trafford, Manchester on Wednesday 19 May 1993.

In 1995, Butt joined the London Broncos, and played their inaugural Super League season, he later joined Huddersfield Giants in 1997 before playing his final season as a professional player at Hunslet Hawks in 1998.

=== International honours ===
Butt won a cap for England while at Featherstone Rovers in 1995 against Wales, and in doing so he became the first South Asian to play for England rugby league.

He also captained Pakistan in their first ever match on 30 November 2011.

== Personal life ==
Butt is the brother of the rugby league footballer who played in the 1980s for Leeds and Featherstone Rovers; Tony Butt.
