= 2007 Super League season results =

Rugby league competition results

This article details the 2007 Super League season results. The season consisted of 27 rounds as well as a play-off finals series after the end of regular rounds. In all, 168 matches were played by twelve teams, covering nine months from February to October.

== Regular season ==
All teams played in 27 regular rounds. Each team was played at least twice, once home and once away, in addition to a Millennium Magic fixture. Four fixtures were arranged according to the teams' league position at the end of the 2006 season.

=== Round 1 ===
Home	Score	Away	Match Information
Home	Score	Away	Date and Time	Venue	Referee	Attendance
St Helens R.F.C.	6 – 14	Harlequins RL	9 February, 20:00 GMT	Knowsley Road	Phil Bentham	7,515
Wigan Warriors	10 – 16	Warrington Wolves	9 February, 20:00 GMT	JJB Stadium	Steve Ganson	21,693
Hull Kingston Rovers	14 – 9	Wakefield Trinity Wildcats	10 February, 18:00 GMT	New Craven Park	Ashley Klein	7,154
Bradford Bulls	18 – 14	Huddersfield Giants	11 February, 15:00 GMT	Grattan Stadium	Richard Silverwood	12,130
Salford City Reds	26 – 30	Leeds Rhinos	11 February, 15:00 GMT	The Willows	Ian Smith	8,070
Hull	10 – 10	Catalans Dragons	11 February, 15:15 GMT	KC Stadium	Ben Thaler	12,673
Source: "Super League XII 2007 - Round 1". Rugby League Project. Retrieved 2009-06-02.

=== Round 2 ===
Home	Score	Away	Match Information
Home	Score	Away	Date and Time	Venue	Referee	Attendance
Leeds Rhinos	18 – 4	Hull	16 February, 20:00 GMT	Headingley Stadium	Steve Ganson	18,659
Catalans Dragons	16 – 18	Wigan Warriors	17 February, 18:00 GMT	Stade Gilbert Brutus	Ian Smith	7,052
Harlequins RL	18 – 18	Salford City Reds	17 February, 19:30 GMT	The Twickenham Stoop	Phil Bentham	3,513
Huddersfield Giants	10 – 17	Hull Kingston Rovers	18 February, 15:00 GMT	Galpharm Stadium	Ben Thaler	7,700
Warrington Wolves	20 – 36	Bradford Bulls	18 February, 15:00 GMT	Halliwell Jones Stadium	Ashley Klein	12,607
Wakefield Trinity Wildcats	29 – 22	St Helens R.F.C.	18 February, 15:30 GMT	Belle Vue	Richard Silverwood	7,385
Source: "Super League XII 2007 - Round 2". Rugby League Project. Retrieved 2009-06-02.

=== Round 3 ===
- Huddersfield Giants vs St Helens RLFC played before round 1 to make St Helens available for the 2007 World Club Challenge.

Home	Score	Away	Match Information
Home	Score	Away	Date and Time	Venue	Referee	Attendance
Huddersfield Giants	10 – 18	St Helens R.F.C.	4 February, 19:05 GMT	Galpharm Stadium	Ashley Klein	9,212
Bradford Bulls	32 – 28	Wigan Warriors	24 February, 18:00 GMT	Grattan Stadium	Ashley Klein	12,798
Catalans Dragons	30 – 22	Leeds Rhinos	24 February, 19:30 GMT	Stade Gilbert Brutus	Richard Silverwood	7,630
Hull Kingston Rovers	10 – 26	Harlequins RL	25 February, 15:00 GMT	New Craven Park	Ben Thaler	7,056
Warrington Wolves	25 – 24	Hull	25 February, 15:00 GMT	Halliwell Jones Stadium	Steve Ganson	11,097
Wakefield Trinity Wildcats	36 – 24	Salford City Reds	25 February, 15:30 GMT	Belle Vue	Ian Smith	6,385
Source: "Super League XII 2007 - Round 3". Rugby League Project. Retrieved 2009-06-02.

=== Round 4 ===
Home	Score	Away	Match Information
Home	Score	Away	Date and Time	Venue	Referee	Attendance
St Helens R.F.C.	34 – 22	Bradford Bulls	2 March, 20:00 GMT	Knowsley Road	Richard Silverwood	11,793
Wigan Warriors	16 – 26	Hull Kingston Rovers	2 March, 20:00 GMT	JJB Stadium	Phil Bentham	15,178
Harlequins RL	12 – 19	Warrington Wolves	3 March, 15:00 GMT	The Twickenham Stoop	Ben Thaler	3,132
Salford City Reds	10 – 0	Catalans Dragons	3 March, 18:00 GMT	The Willows	Steve Ganson	4,085
Leeds Rhinos	16 – 12	Huddersfield Giants	4 March, 15:00 GMT	Headingley Stadium	Ian Smith	15,703
Hull	6 – 19	Wakefield Trinity Wildcats	4 March, 15:15 GMT	KC Stadium	Ashley Klein	13,229
Source: "Super League XII 2007 - Round 4". Rugby League Project. Retrieved 2009-06-02.

=== Round 5 ===
Home	Score	Away	Match Information
Home	Score	Away	Date and Time	Venue	Referee	Attendance
Warrington Wolves	12 – 48	St Helens R.F.C.	9 March, 20:00 GMT	Halliwell Jones Stadium	Ashley Klein	13,024
Wigan Warriors	16 – 12	Harlequins RL	9 March, 20:00 GMT	JJB Stadium	Ian Smith	14,971
Hull Kingston Rovers	22 – 20	Leeds Rhinos	10 March, 18:00 GMT	New Craven Park	Richard Silverwood	8,086
Bradford Bulls	56 – 18	Salford City Reds	11 March, 15:00 GMT	Grattan Stadium	Ben Thaler	10,640
Huddersfield Giants	12 – 16	Hull	11 March, 15:00 GMT	Galpharm Stadium	Steve Ganson	7,188
Wakefield Trinity Wildcats	40 – 20	Catalans Dragons	11 March, 15:30 GMT	Belle Vue	Phil Bentham	5,332
Source: "Super League XII 2007 - Round 5". Rugby League Project. Retrieved 2009-06-02.

=== Round 6 ===
Home	Score	Away	Match Information
Home	Score	Away	Date and Time	Venue	Referee	Attendance
Salford City Reds	6 – 25	Wigan Warriors	16 March, 20:00 GMT	The Willows	Steve Ganson	6,025
Wakefield Trinity Wildcats	26 – 32	Leeds Rhinos	16 March, 20:00 GMT	Belle Vue	Ashley Klein	9,973
Harlequins RL	22 – 36	Bradford Bulls	17 March, 15:00 GMT	The Twickenham Stoop	Phil Bentham	4,011
Hull	24 – 12	St Helens R.F.C.	17 March, 18:00 GMT	KC Stadium	Richard Silverwood	12,678
Catalans Dragons	23 – 22	Huddersfield Giants	17 March, 19:00 GMT	Stade Gilbert Brutus	Ben Thaler	8,300
Warrington Wolves	30 – 12	Hull Kingston Rovers	18 March, 15:00 GMT	Halliwell Jones Stadium	Ian Smith	10,030
Source: "Super League XII 2007 - Round 6". Rugby League Project. Retrieved 2009-06-02.

=== Round 7 ===
Home	Score	Away	Match Information
Home	Score	Away	Date and Time	Venue	Referee	Attendance
Hull	20 – 30	Wigan Warriors	23 March, 20:00 GMT	KC Stadium	Ashley Klein	12,755
Leeds Rhinos	28 – 16	Harlequins RL	23 March, 20:00 GMT	Headingley Stadium	Ben Thaler	15,123
St Helens R.F.C.	42 – 14	Hull Kingston Rovers	23 March, 20:00 GMT	Knowsley Road	Phil Bentham	10,523
Bradford Bulls	22 – 29	Catalans Dragons	25 March, 15:00 BST	Grattan Stadium	Ian Smith	11,298
Huddersfield Giants	16 – 18	Salford City Reds	25 March, 15:00 BST	Galpharm Stadium	Richard Silverwood	5,275
Wakefield Trinity Wildcats	30 – 24	Warrington Wolves	25 March, 18:05 BST	Belle Vue	Steve Ganson	6,119
Source: "Super League XII 2007 - Round 7". Rugby League Project. Retrieved 2009-06-02.

=== Round 8 ===
Home	Score	Away	Match Information
Home	Score	Away	Date and Time	Venue	Referee	Attendance
Bradford Bulls	14 – 18	Leeds Rhinos	5 April, 20:00 BST	Grattan Stadium	Steve Ganson	16,706
Harlequins RL	30 – 28	Hull	6 April, 15:00 BST	The Twickenham Stoop	Ian Smith	3,545
Hull Kingston Rovers	20 – 34	Catalans Dragons	6 April, 15:00 BST	New Craven Park	Phil Bentham	6,701
Salford City Reds	32 – 34	Warrington Wolves	6 April, 15:00 BST	The Willows	Ben Thaler	6,177
Wigan Warriors	14 – 32	St Helens R.F.C.	6 April, 17:05 BST	JJB Stadium	Ashley Klein	24,028
Huddersfield Giants	56 – 12	Wakefield Trinity Wildcats	6 April, 20:00 BST	Galpharm Stadium	Richard Silverwood	6,757
Source: "Super League XII 2007 - Round 8". Rugby League Project. Retrieved 2009-06-02.

=== Round 9 ===
Home	Score	Away	Match Information
Home	Score	Away	Date and Time	Venue	Referee	Attendance
Hull	22 – 14	Hull Kingston Rovers	9 April, 12:30 BST	KC Stadium	Steve Ganson	23,002
St Helens R.F.C.	48 – 4	Salford City Reds	9 April, 15:00 BST	Knowsley Road	Ian Smith	9,409
Warrington Wolves	18 – 26	Huddersfield Giants	9 April, 15:00 BST	Halliwell Jones Stadium	Ashley Klein	9,403
Wakefield Trinity Wildcats	24 – 36	Bradford Bulls	9 April, 15:30 BST	Belle Vue	Phil Bentham	9,106
Catalans Dragons	16 – 38	Harlequins RL	9 April, 17:00 BST	Stade Gilbert Brutus	Ben Thaler	9,300
Leeds Rhinos	18 – 20	Wigan Warriors	10 April, 20:00 BST	Headingley Stadium	Richard Silverwood	16,465
Source: "Super League XII 2007 - Round 9". Rugby League Project. Retrieved 2009-06-02.

=== Round 10 ===
Home	Score	Away	Match Information
Home	Score	Away	Date and Time	Venue	Referee	Attendance
Salford City Reds	18 – 35	Hull	13 April, 20:00 BST	The Willows	Ashley Klein	4,077
St Helens R.F.C.	53 – 10	Catalans Dragons	13 April, 20:00 BST	Knowsley Road	Phil Bentham	7,918
Harlequins RL	22 – 22	Wakefield Trinity Wildcats	14 April, 18:00 BST	The Twickenham Stoop	Ian Smith	2,532
Bradford Bulls	52 – 22	Hull Kingston Rovers	15 April, 15:00 BST	Grattan Stadium	Richard Silverwood	10,881
Huddersfield Giants	41 – 16	Wigan Warriors	15 April, 15:00 BST	Galpharm Stadium	Steve Ganson	7,117
Warrington Wolves	10 – 52	Leeds Rhinos	15 April, 15:00 BST	Halliwell Jones Stadium	Ben Thaler	10,155
Source: "Super League XII 2007 - Round 10". Rugby League Project. Retrieved 2009-06-02.

=== Round 11 ===
Home	Score	Away	Match Information
Home	Score	Away	Date and Time	Venue	Referee	Attendance
Hull	22 – 32	Bradford Bulls	20 April, 20:00 BST	KC Stadium	Ben Thaler	12,767
Wigan Warriors	44 – 10	Wakefield Trinity Wildcats	20 April, 20:00 BST	JJB Stadium	Phil Bentham	14,108
Leeds Rhinos	38 – 19	St Helens R.F.C.	21 April, 18:15 BST	Headingley Stadium	Ashley Klein	21,975
Catalans Dragons	27 – 16	Warrington Wolves	21 April, 18:30 BST	Stade Gilbert Brutus	Ian Smith	9,050
Huddersfield Giants	46 – 16	Harlequins RL	22 April, 15:00 BST	Galpharm Stadium	Richard Silverwood	4,894
Hull Kingston Rovers	24 – 28	Salford City Reds	22 April, 15:00 BST	New Craven Park	Gareth Hewer	6,299
Source: "Super League XII 2007 - Round 11". Rugby League Project. Retrieved 2009-06-02.

=== Round 12 ===
Home	Score	Away	Match Information
Home	Score	Away	Date and Time	Venue	Referee	Attendance
Hull Kingston Rovers	16 – 28	Huddersfield Giants	27 April, 20:00 BST	New Craven Park	Phil Bentham	6,597
Leeds Rhinos	54 – 8	Catalans Dragons	27 April, 20:00 BST	Headingley Stadium	Ben Thaler	15,581
Salford City Reds	24 – 50	Wigan Warriors	27 April, 20:00 BST	The Willows	Richard Silverwood	6,603
Wakefield Trinity Wildcats	18 – 20	Hull	28 April, 18:00 BST	Belle Vue	Steve Ganson	7,142
Bradford Bulls	36 – 24	Warrington Wolves	29 April, 15:00 BST	Grattan Stadium	Ashley Klein	11,276
Harlequins RL	6 – 44	St Helens R.F.C.	29 April, 15:00 BST	The Twickenham Stoop	Ian Smith	4,362
Source: "Super League XII 2007 - Round 12". Rugby League Project. Retrieved 2009-06-02.

=== Round 13: Millennium Magic ===
- This round marked the first ever Super League Magic Weekend. All twelve teams played on 5 and 6 May in three games each day at the Millennium Stadium in Cardiff.
- Attendance figures represent how many individual fans entered over the duration of the whole day.

Home	Score	Away	Match Information
Home	Score	Away	Date and Time	Venue	Referee	Attendance
Catalans Dragons	28 – 32	Harlequins RL	5 May, 15:00 BST	Millennium Stadium	Phil Bentham	32,364
Hull	10 – 14	Hull Kingston Rovers	5 May, 17:00 BST	Millennium Stadium	Richard Silverwood	32,364
St Helens R.F.C.	34 – 18	Wigan Warriors	5 May, 19:00 BST	Millennium Stadium	Ashley Klein	32,364
Huddersfield Giants	36 – 12	Wakefield Trinity Wildcats	6 May, 14:00 BST	Millennium Stadium	Ian Smith	26,447
Salford City Reds	18 – 50	Warrington Wolves	6 May, 16:00 BST	Millennium Stadium	Ben Thaler	26,447
Bradford Bulls	38 – 42	Leeds Rhinos	6 May, 18:00 BST	Millennium Stadium	Steve Ganson	26,447
Source: "Super League XII 2007 - Round 13". Rugby League Project. Retrieved 2009-06-02.

=== Round 14 ===
Home	Score	Away	Match Information
Home	Score	Away	Date and Time	Venue	Referee	Attendance
Huddersfield Giants	36 – 12	Bradford Bulls	18 May, 20:00 BST	Galpharm Stadium	Phil Bentham	8,667
St Helens R.F.C.	34 – 14	Wakefield Trinity Wildcats	18 May, 20:00 BST	Knowsley Road	Gareth Hewer	8,529
Wigan Warriors	10 – 12	Hull Kingston Rovers	18 May, 20:00 BST	JJB Stadium	Ronnie Laughton	13,538
Catalans Dragons	66 – 6	Salford City Reds	19 May, 18:30 BST	Stade Gilbert Brutus	Richard Silverwood	8,820
Warrington Wolves	4 – 17	Harlequins RL	19 May, 19:30 BST	Halliwell Jones Stadium	Ben Thaler	7,818
Hull	16 – 12	Leeds Rhinos	20 May, 15:15 BST	KC Stadium	Ian Smith	14,256
Source: "Super League XII 2007 - Round 14". Rugby League Project. Retrieved 2009-06-02.

=== Round 15 ===
Home	Score	Away	Match Information
Home	Score	Away	Date and Time	Venue	Referee	Attendance
Salford City Reds	14 – 12	Huddersfield Giants	25 May, 20:00 BST	The Willows	Ben Thaler	3,379
Wigan Warriors	47 – 16	Hull	26 May, 18:00 BST	JJB Stadium	Phil Bentham	14,314
Bradford Bulls	44 – 18	Harlequins RL	27 May, 15:00 BST	Grattan Stadium	Gareth Hewer	10,418
Hull Kingston Rovers	10 – 18	Leeds Rhinos	27 May, 15:30 BST	New Craven Park	Ashley Klein	7,731
Wakefield Trinity Wildcats	18 – 12	Catalans Dragons	27 May, 15:30 BST	Belle Vue	Ian Smith	4,023
Warrington Wolves	12 – 40	St Helens R.F.C.	28 May, 12:05 BST	Halliwell Jones Stadium	Richard Silverwood	13,024
Source: "Super League XII 2007 - Round 15". Rugby League Project. Retrieved 2009-06-02.

=== Round 16 ===
Home	Score	Away	Match Information
Home	Score	Away	Date and Time	Venue	Referee	Attendance
Leeds Rhinos	42 – 26	Warrington Wolves	1 June, 20:00 BST	Headingley Stadium	Ben Thaler	15,873
St Helens R.F.C.	27 – 26	Salford City Reds	1 June, 20:00 BST	Knowsley Road	Thierry Alibert	7,801
Harlequins RL	18 – 8	Wigan Warriors	2 June, 15:00 BST	The Twickenham Stoop	Ashley Klein	5,657
Catalans Dragons	20 – 28	Bradford Bulls	2 June, 19:00 BST	Stade Gilbert Brutus	Phil Bentham	7,555
Hull	9 – 9	Huddersfield Giants	3 June, 15:15 BST	KC Stadium	Ian Smith	12,094
Wakefield Trinity Wildcats	30 – 15	Hull Kingston Rovers	3 June, 18:00 BST	Belle Vue	Richard Silverwood	6,107
Source: "Super League XII 2007 - Round 16". Rugby League Project. Retrieved 2009-06-02.

=== Round 17 ===
Home	Score	Away	Match Information
Home	Score	Away	Date and Time	Venue	Referee	Attendance
Salford City Reds	5 – 2	Harlequins RL	15 June, 20:00 BST	The Willows	Richard Silverwood	4,067
Wigan Warriors	30 – 0	Catalans Dragons	15 June, 20:00 BST	JJB Stadium	Steve Ganson	12,641
Huddersfield Giants	12 – 25	Leeds Rhinos	17 June, 15:00 BST	Galpharm Stadium	Ashley Klein	10,241
Hull Kingston Rovers	0 – 40	St Helens R.F.C.	17 June, 15:00 BST	New Craven Park	Phil Bentham	7,011
Warrington Wolves	31 – 12	Wakefield Trinity Wildcats	17 June, 15:00 BST	Halliwell Jones Stadium	Ian Smith	10,324
Bradford Bulls	34 – 8	Hull	17 June, 16:00 BST	Grattan Stadium	Ben Thaler	11,557
Source: "Super League XII 2007 - Round 17". Rugby League Project. Retrieved 2009-06-02.

=== Round 18 ===
Home	Score	Away	Match Information
Home	Score	Away	Date and Time	Venue	Referee	Attendance
Leeds Rhinos	14 – 38	Bradford Bulls	29 June, 20:00 BST	Headingley Stadium	Phil Bentham	22,000
Harlequins RL	32 – 18	Hull Kingston Rovers	30 June, 13:30 BST	The Twickenham Stoop	Steve Ganson	3,278
St Helens R.F.C.	54 – 4	Huddersfield Giants	30 June, 18:00 BST	Knowsley Road	Ben Thaler	7,771
Catalans Dragons	24 – 22	Warrington Wolves	30 June, 19:00 BST	Stade Gilbert Brutus	Ashley Klein	8,850
Wakefield Trinity Wildcats	32 – 6	Wigan Warriors	1 July, 15:30 BST	Belle Vue	Richard Silverwood	8,126
Hull	48 – 26	Salford City Reds	29 July, 15:15 BST	KC Stadium	Phil Bentham	13,338
Source: "Super League XII 2007 - Round 18". Rugby League Project. Retrieved 2009-06-02.

=== Round 19 ===
Home	Score	Away	Match Information
Home	Score	Away	Date and Time	Venue	Referee	Attendance
Salford City Reds	18 – 35	Wakefield Trinity Wildcats	6 July, 20:00 BST	The Willows	Phil Bentham	4,178
St Helens R.F.C.	10 – 22	Leeds Rhinos	6 July, 20:00 BST	Knowsley Road	Richard Silverwood	10,074
Wigan Warriors	25 – 18	Bradford Bulls	6 July, 20:00 BST	JJB Stadium	Steve Ganson	15,107
Harlequins RL	30 – 22	Catalans Dragons	7 July, 18:00 BST	The Twickenham Stoop	Ashley Klein	2,346
Hull Kingston Rovers	20 – 30	Hull	8 July, 12:30 BST	New Craven Park	Ben Thaler	9,035
Huddersfield Giants	28 – 47	Warrington Wolves	8 July, 15:00 BST	Galpharm Stadium	Ian Smith	6,822
Source: "Super League XII 2007 - Round 19". Rugby League Project. Retrieved 2009-06-02.

=== Round 20 ===
Home	Score	Away	Match Information
Home	Score	Away	Date and Time	Venue	Referee	Attendance
Wigan Warriors	18 – 2	Leeds Rhinos	12 July, 19:45 BST	JJB Stadium	Ben Thaler	14,554
Bradford Bulls	10 – 4	St Helens R.F.C.	13 July, 20:00 BST	Grattan Stadium	Phil Bentham	11,214
Hull	20 – 8	Harlequins RL	13 July, 20:00 BST	KC Stadium	Ashley Klein	12,270
Catalans Dragons	20 – 22	Hull Kingston Rovers	14 July, 19:00 BST	Stade Gilbert Brutus	Ian Smith	7,830
Warrington Wolves	42 – 6	Salford City Reds	15 July, 15:00 BST	Halliwell Jones Stadium	Richard Silverwood	9,634
Wakefield Trinity Wildcats	23 – 24	Huddersfield Giants	15 July, 15:30 BST	Belle Vue	Steve Ganson	5,241
Source: "Super League XII 2007 - Round 20". Rugby League Project. Retrieved 2009-06-02.

=== Round 21 ===
Home	Score	Away	Match Information
Home	Score	Away	Date and Time	Venue	Referee	Attendance
Leeds Rhinos	16 – 23	Wakefield Trinity Wildcats	20 July, 20:00 BST	Headingley Stadium	Richard Silverwood	16,654
St Helens R.F.C.	19 – 12	Wigan Warriors	20 July, 20:00 BST	Knowsley Road	Ashley Klein	14,293
Harlequins RL	10 – 22	Huddersfield Giants	21 July, 15:00 BST	The Twickenham Stoop	Phil Bentham	2,478
Salford City Reds	14 – 10	Bradford Bulls	21 July, 18:00 BST	The Willows	Ian Smith	3,438
Catalans Dragons	18 – 34	Hull	21 July, 19:00 BST	Stade Gilbert Brutus	Steve Ganson	7,560
Hull Kingston Rovers	20 – 60	Warrington Wolves	22 July, 15:00 BST	New Craven Park	Ben Thaler	6,640
Source: "Super League XII 2007 - Round 21". Rugby League Project. Retrieved 2009-06-02.

=== Round 22 ===
Home	Score	Away	Match Information
Home	Score	Away	Date and Time	Venue	Referee	Attendance
Salford City Reds	24 – 30	Hull Kingston Rovers	3 August, 20:00 BST	The Willows	Ashley Klein	7,165
St Helens R.F.C.	31 – 20	Hull	3 August, 20:00 BST	Knowsley Road	Ben Thaler	10,005
Harlequins RL	20 – 54	Leeds Rhinos	5 August, 12:30 BST	The Twickenham Stoop	Phil Bentham	3,734
Bradford Bulls	38 – 24	Wakefield Trinity Wildcats	5 August, 15:00 BST	Grattan Stadium	Steve Ganson	10,701
Huddersfield Giants	42 – 22	Catalans Dragons	5 August, 15:00 BST	Galpharm Stadium	Richard Silverwood	4,319
Warrington Wolves	43 – 24	Wigan Warriors	5 August, 15:00 BST	Halliwell Jones Stadium	Ian Smith	12,552
Source: "Super League XII 2007 - Round 22". Rugby League Project. Retrieved 2009-06-02.

=== Round 23 ===
Home	Score	Away	Match Information
Home	Score	Away	Date and Time	Venue	Referee	Attendance
Leeds Rhinos	52 – 14	Salford City Reds	10 August, 20:00 BST	Headingley Stadium	Ben Thaler	15,637
Wigan Warriors	20 – 12	Huddersfield Giants	10 August, 20:00 BST	JJB Stadium	Steve Ganson	12,744
Catalans Dragons	21 – 0	St Helens R.F.C.	11 August, 19:00 BST	Stade Gilbert Brutus	Phil Bentham	8,655
Hull Kingston Rovers	10 – 28	Bradford Bulls	12 August, 15:00 BST	New Craven Park	Ian Smith	6,695
Hull	46 – 14	Warrington Wolves	12 August, 15:15 BST	KC Stadium	Ashley Klein	13,404
Wakefield Trinity Wildcats	28 – 14	Harlequins RL	12 August, 19:00 BST	Belle Vue	Richard Silverwood	5,128
Source: "Super League XII 2007 - Round 23". Rugby League Project. Retrieved 2009-06-02.

=== Round 24 ===
Home	Score	Away	Match Information
Home	Score	Away	Date and Time	Venue	Referee	Attendance
Leeds Rhinos	34 – 18	Hull Kingston Rovers	17 August, 20:00 BST	Headingley Stadium	Richard Silverwood	17,389
Salford City Reds	20 – 32	St Helens R.F.C.	17 August, 20:00 BST	The Willows	Ian Smith	5,031
Wakefield Trinity Wildcats	24 – 42	Hull	17 August, 20:00 BST	Belle Vue	Phil Bentham	8,115
Harlequins RL	16 – 16	Wigan Warriors	18 August, 15:00 BST	The Twickenham Stoop	Ben Thaler	3,200
Huddersfield Giants	26 – 22	Bradford Bulls	19 August, 15:00 BST	Galpharm Stadium	Ashley Klein	6,824
Warrington Wolves	22 – 18	Catalans Dragons	19 August, 19:00 BST	Halliwell Jones Stadium	Steve Ganson	8,125
Source: "Super League XII 2007 - Round 24". Rugby League Project. Retrieved 2009-06-02.

=== Round 25 ===
Home	Score	Away	Match Information
Home	Score	Away	Date and Time	Venue	Referee	Attendance
St Helens R.F.C.	32 – 10	Harlequins RL	31 August, 20:00 BST	Knowsley Road	Ben Thaler	7,939
Warrington Wolves	22 – 34	Huddersfield Giants	31 August, 20:00 BST	Halliwell Jones Stadium	Richard Silverwood	8,843
Wigan Warriors	40 – 16	Salford City Reds	31 August, 20:00 BST	JJB Stadium	Ashley Klein	13,611
Catalans Dragons	38 – 20	Wakefield Trinity Wildcats	1 September, 19:00 BST	Stade Gilbert Brutus	Ian Smith	7,325
Hull	6 – 42	Hull Kingston Rovers	2 September, 12:30 BST	KC Stadium	Steve Ganson	23,004
Bradford Bulls	16 – 16	Leeds Rhinos	2 September, 19:30 BST	Grattan Stadium	Phil Bentham	18,195
Source: "Super League XII 2007 - Round 25". Rugby League Project. Retrieved 2009-06-02.

=== Round 26 ===
Home	Score	Away	Match Information
Home	Score	Away	Date and Time	Venue	Referee	Attendance
Leeds Rhinos	6 – 17	Hull	7 September, 20:00 BST	Headingley Stadium	Richard Silverwood	17,424
St Helens R.F.C.	36 – 16	Warrington Wolves	7 September, 20:00 BST	Knowsley Road	Ashley Klein	11,746
Harlequins RL	22 – 16	Salford City Reds	8 September, 15:00 BST	The Twickenham Stoop	Phil Bentham	2,347
Bradford Bulls	40 – 8	Catalans Dragons	9 September, 15:00 BST	Grattan Stadium	Ben Thaler	9,350
Hull Kingston Rovers	24 – 40	Wigan Warriors	9 September, 15:00 BST	New Craven Park	Ian Smith	7,370
Huddersfield Giants	24 – 22	Wakefield Trinity Wildcats	9 September, 16:00 BST	Galpharm Stadium	Steven Ganson	7,066
Source: "Super League XII 2007 - Round 26". Rugby League Project. Retrieved 2009-06-02.

=== Round 27 ===
Home	Score	Away	Match Information
Home	Score	Away	Date and Time	Venue	Referee	Attendance
Hull	20 – 10	Bradford Bulls	14 September, 20:00 BST	KC Stadium	Richard Silverwood	14,402
Leeds Rhinos	46 – 4	Wakefield Trinity Wildcats	14 September, 20:00 BST	Headingley Stadium	Steve Ganson	19,226
Salford City Reds	26 – 34	Warrington Wolves	14 September, 20:00 BST	The Willows	Ben Thaler	5,152
Wigan Warriors	20 – 12	St Helens R.F.C.	14 September, 20:00 BST	JJB Stadium	Ashley Klein	22,031
Hull Kingston Rovers	25 – 24	Huddersfield Giants	15 September, 19:00 BST	New Craven Park	Phil Bentham	6,700
Catalans Dragons	30 – 14	Harlequins RL	15 September, 19:00 BST	Stade Gilbert Brutus	Gareth Hewer	8,420
Source: "Super League XII 2007 - Round 27". Rugby League Project. Retrieved 2009-06-02.

== Play-offs ==
The 2007 Super League championship was decided through a play-off system. The involved teams were set according to their final position in the league tables after all 27 regular rounds. The play-off series had no bearing on the minor premiership (otherwise known as the League Leaders' Shield).

=== Format ===
Super League XII gave six places for its play-off finals. It was the sixth successive year the top-six play-off system was used. At the end of the regular season, the table was set:

	Team	Pld	W	D	L	PF	PA	PD	Pts
1	St Helens R.F.C.	27	19	0	8	783	422	+361	38
2	Leeds Rhinos	27	18	1	8	747	487	+260	37
3	Bradford Bulls	27	17	1	9	778	560	+218	33^{[A]}
4	Hull	27	14	2	11	573	553	+20	30
5	Huddersfield Giants	27	13	1	13	638	543	+95	27
6	Wigan Warriors	27	15	1	11	621	527	+94	27^{[B]}

^{A} Note A: Bradford deducted 2 points for salary cap breaches
^{B} Note B: Wigan deducted 4 points for salary cap breaches

Home field advantage was given by league position at the end of regular rounds, the lower of the two teams playing at the higher team's ground. The only exception to this rule was the Grand Final, which was held at Old Trafford following tradition. The play-off system followed the double elimination rule for the first and second placed teams, meaning whichever of the teams lost in the qualifying semi-final had to lose again in order to be knocked-out of the tournament entirely.

=== Bracket ===
Elimination play-offs
21 September 2007
3	Bradford Bulls	30
6	Wigan Warriors	31
22 September 2007
4	Hull	22
5	Huddersfield Giants	16

Qualifying/Elimination semifinals
28 September 2007
1	St Helens R.F.C.	10
2	Leeds Rhinos	8
29 September 2007
Hull F.C.	18
Wigan Warriors	21

Elimination final
5 October 2007
Leeds Rhinos	36
Wigan Warriors	6

Grand Final
13 October 2007
St Helens R.F.C.	6
Leeds Rhinos	33

=== Details ===
Home	Score	Away	Match Information
Home	Score	Away	Date and Time	Venue	Referee	Crowd
Elimination play-offs
Bradford Bulls	30 – 31	Wigan Warriors	21 September, 20:00 BST	Grattan Stadium	Steve Ganson	9,055
Hull	22 – 16	Huddersfield Giants	22 September, 19:00 BST	KC Stadium	Ashley Klein	12,140
Qualifying semifinals
St Helens R.F.C.	10 – 8	Leeds Rhinos	28 September, 20:00 BST	Knowsley Road	Ashley Klein	12,064
Elimination semifinal
Hull	18 – 21	Wigan Warriors	29 September, 19:00 BST	KC Stadium	Steve Ganson	16,291
Elimination final
Leeds Rhinos	36 – 6	Wigan Warriors	5 October, 20:00 BST	Headingley Stadium	Steve Ganson	16,112
2007 Super League Grand Final
Leeds Rhinos	33 – 6	St Helens R.F.C.	13 October, 18:00 BST	Old Trafford	Ashley Klein	71,352
Sources: Elimination play-offs: Bradford vs Wigan, Hull FC vs Huddersfield; Qualifying Semifinal: St Helens vs Leeds; Elimination Semifinal: Hull FC vs Wigan; Elimination Final: Leeds vs Wigan; Grand Final: St Helens vs Leeds.

== Progression table ==
- Green cells indicate teams in play-off places at the end of the round. An underlined number indicates the team finished first in the table in that round.
- Note: Table is in round-by-round format, and does not necessarily follow chronological order. Rearranged fixtures are treated as though they were played on their respective rounds' weekends. Rearranged fixtures:
  - Huddersfield Giants vs St Helens RLFC, Round 3
  - Hull FC vs Salford City Reds, Round 18

	Team	Round																											
	Team	1	2	3	4	5	6	7	8	9	10	11	12	13	14	15	16	17	18	19	20	21	22	23	24	25	26	27	F
1	St. Helens	0	0	2	4	6	6	8	10	12	14	14	16	18	20	22	24	26	28	28	28	30	32	32	34	36	38	38	38
2	Leeds	2	4	4	6	6	8	10	12	12	14	16	18	20	20	22	24	26	26	28	28	28	30	32	34	35	35	37	37
3	Bradford	2	4	6	6	8	10	10	10	12	14	16	18	18	18	20	22	24	26	26	28	28	30	32	32	33	35	35	33
4	Hull	1	1	1	1	3	5	5	5	7	9	9	11	11	13	13	14	14	16	18	20	22	22	24	26	26	28	30	30
5	Huddersfield	0	0	0	0	0	0	0	2	4	6	8	10	12	14	14	15	15	15	15	17	19	21	21	23	25	27	27	27
6	Wigan	0	2	2	2	4	6	8	8	10	10	12	14	14	14	16	16	18	18	20	22	22	22	24	25	27	29	31	27
7	Warrington	2	2	4	6	6	8	8	10	10	9	10	10	12	12	12	12	14	14	16	18	20	22	22	24	24	24	26	26
8	Wakefield Trinity	0	2	4	6	8	8	10	10	10	11	11	11	11	11	13	15	15	17	19	19	21	21	23	23	23	23	23	23
9	Harlequins RL	2	3	5	5	5	5	5	7	9	10	10	10	12	14	14	16	16	18	20	20	20	20	20	21	21	23	23	23
10	Catalans Dragons	1	1	3	3	3	5	7	9	9	9	11	11	11	13	13	13	13	15	15	17	19	15	17	17	19	19	21	21
11	Hull Kingston Rovers	2	4	4	6	8	8	8	8	8	8	8	8	10	12	12	12	12	12	12	14	14	16	16	16	18	18	20	20
12	Salford	0	1	1	3	3	3	5	5	5	5	7	7	7	7	9	9	11	11	11	11	13	13	13	13	13	13	13	13

- Bradford deducted 2 points, and Wigan deducted 4 points for salary cap breaches.
