= Rugby in Malta =

Rugby in Malta may refer to:

- Rugby league in Malta
- Rugby union in Malta
