= List of national men's football teams =

List of national men's football teams may refer to:

- List of men's national association football teams
- List of International Rugby League members
- List of international rugby union teams
