= List of International Rugby League members =

The International Rugby League (IRL) was founded in its current form in 1998, consisting of 10 full members. The federation currently consists of 29 members (15 full and 14 affiliate), and 28 observer members.

== Full Members ==
Nation	Governing body	Membership details	Ref.
Australia	Australian Rugby League Commission	Founding Member: 1998–present	
Cook Islands	Cook Islands Rugby League	Founding Member: 1998–present	
England	Rugby Football League	Founding Member: 1998–present	
Fiji	Fiji National Rugby League	Founding Member: 1998–present	
France	French Rugby League Federation	Founding Member: 1998–present	
Ghana	Rugby League Federation Ghana	Full Member: 2025–present Affiliate Member: 2020–2025; Observer: 2014–2020	
Jamaica	Jamaica Rugby League Association	Full Member: 2013–present Affiliate: 2011–2013; Observer: ????–2011	
Kenya	Kenya Rugby League	Full Member: 2026–present Affiliate Member: 2023–2026; Observer: 2022–2026	
New Zealand	New Zealand Rugby League	Founding Member: 1998–present	
Papua New Guinea	Papua New Guinea Rugby Football League	Founding Member: 1998–present	
Samoa	Rugby League Samoa	Founding Member: 1998–present	
Serbia	Serbian Rugby League	Full Member: 2012–present Affiliate: ????–2012; Observer: ????–????	
Tonga	Tonga National Rugby League	Founding Member: 1998–2020 (Note: Tonga National Rugby League was expelled from the International Rugby League (IRL) in 2020 following refusing to enact recommend changes following the conclusion of an investigation by the IRL.)	
Tonga	Tonga Rugby League XIII	Full Member: 2024–present	
Ukraine	Ukrainian Federation of Rugby League	Full Member: 2013–present Affiliate: ????–2013; Observer: ????–????	
Wales	Wales Rugby League	Full Member: 2010–present Affiliate: ????–2010; Observer: ????–????	

== Affiliate Members ==
Nation	Governing body	Membership details	Ref.
Canada	Canada Rugby League	Affiliate Member: 2013–present Observer: 2010–2013	
Czech Republic	Czech Rugby League Association	Affiliate Member: 2011–present Observer: 2006–2011	
Germany	Rugby League Deutschland	Affiliate Member: ????–2014; Observer: 2006–????; 2014–2015	
Germany	Nationaler Rugby League Deutschland	Affiliate Member: 2017–present	
Greece	Greek Rugby League Association	Affiliate Member: 2018–present Observer: 2017–2018	
Ireland	Rugby League Ireland	Affiliate Member: 2000–2010; 2024–present Full Member: 2010–2024; Observer: ????–????	
Italy	Federazione Italiana Rugby League	Affiliate Member: 2010–2017; 2024–present Full Member: 2017–2024; Observer: 2003–2010	
Lebanon	Lebanese Rugby League Federation	Affiliate Member: ????–2012; 2024–present Full Member: 2012–2024; Observer: ????–????	
Malta	Malta Rugby League	Affiliate Member: 2013–present Observer: ????–2013	
Netherlands	Netherlandse National Rugby League Bond	Observer: 2003–2006	
Netherlands	Netherlandse Rugby League Bond	Affiliate Member: 2017–present Observer: 2012–2017	
Nigeria	Nigeria Rugby League	Affiliate Member: 2020–present Observer: 2014–2020	
Norway	Rugby League Norge	Affiliate Member: 2011–present Observer: 2009–2011	
Scotland	Scotland Rugby League	Affiliate Member: 2007–2011; 2024–present Full Member: 2011–2024; Observer: ????–2007	
South Africa	South African Rugby League	Affiliate Member: 2026–present Full Member: 1998–2026; Founding Member	
United States	American National Rugby League	Affiliate Member: ????–2015; Observer: ????–????	
United States	USA Rugby League	Affiliate Member: 2015–present	

== Observer Members ==
Nation	Governing body	Membership details	Ref.
Albania	Albanian Rugby League	Observer Member: 2018–present	
Argentina	Argentina Rugby League	Observer Member: 2024–present	
Bosnia and Herzegovina	Asocijacija Ragbi 13 Bosnia-Hercegovina	Observer Member: 2018–present	
Brazil	Confederação Brasileira de Rugby League	Observer Member: ????–2019; 2026–present Affiliate Member: 2019–2026	
Bulgaria	Bulgarian Rugby League Federation	Observer Member: 2017–present	
Burundi	Burundi Rugby League	Observer Member: 2016–present	
Cameroon	Cameroon Rugby League XIII	Observer Member: 2017–2021; 2026–present Affiliate Member: 2021–2026	
Chile	Federacion de Rugby Futbol League 13	Observer Member: ????–2018; 2025–Present; Affiliate: 2018–2025	
Colombia	Colombia Rugby League XIII	Observer Member: ????–present	
DR Congo	DR Congo Rugby League XIII	Observer Member: 2015–present	
Estonia	Estonian Rugby League Federation	Observer: ????–2012	
Estonia	Estonia Rugby League	Observer Member: 2026–present	
Ivory Coast	Cote D'Ivoire Rugby League	Observer Member: 2022–present	
India	Rugby League India	Observer Member: 2026–present	
Japan	Japanese Rugby League Association	Observer Member: 2021–present	
Libya	Libya Rugby League Association	Observer Member: 2019–present	
Morocco	Fédération Marocaine de Rugby League	Observer Member: ????–2021; 2025–Present; Affiliate Member: 2021–2025	
Mexico	Mexican Rugby Federation	Observer Member: 2018–present	
Montenegro	Montenegro Rugby League	Observer Member: 2021–present	
Palestine	Palestine Rugby League	Observer Member: 2014–present	
Philippines	Philippines National Rugby League	Observer Member: 2021–present	
Poland	Polska Rugby XIII	Observer Member: 2017–present	
Portugal	Portugal Rugby League	Observer Member: 2026–present	
Sierra Leone	Sierra Leone Rugby League Federation	Observer Member: 2014–present	
Singapore	Singapore National Rugby League	Observer Member: 2026–present	
Slovakia	Slovakia Rugby League	Observer Member: 2023–present	
Spain	Spanish Rugby League Association	Observer Member: 2013–2015; 2024–present Affiliate Member: 2015–2024	
Sweden	Sweden Rugby League	Observer Member: 2011–present	
Turkey	Turkish Rugby League Association	Observer Member: 2017–2018; 2026–present Affiliate Member: 2018–2026	
Vanuatu	Vanuatu Rugby League	Observer Member: ????–present	

== Suspended Members ==
Nation	Governing body	Membership details	Ref.
Russia (Note: Russia are currently suspended due to the 2022 Russian invasion of Ukraine)	Russian Rugby League Federation	Observer Member: 1993–2000; Affiliate Member: 2000–2003; Full Member: 2003–2010	
Russia	Association of Rugby League Clubs	Affiliate Member: 2010–2013; 2024–present Full Member: 2013–2024	

== Former Members ==
Nation	Governing body	Membership details	Ref.
Belgium	Belgium Rugby League Association	Observer member: 2013–2024	
Catalonia	Associació Catalana de Rugby Lliga	Observer member: 2008–2014	
Denmark	Denmark Rugby League Federation	Observer member: 2011–2024	
El Salvador	El Salvador Rugby League	Observer member: 2021–2025	
Ethiopia	Ethiopian Rugby League Association	Observer member: 2014–2024	
Georgia	Georgia Rugby League	Observer Member: ????–2006	
Hungary	Hungarian Rugby League Federation	Observer member: 2013–2026	
Latvia	Latvia Rugby League	Observer member: 2008–2024	
North Macedonia	Macedonian Rugby League	Observer member: 2023–2026	
Saudi Arabia	Saudi Arabia Rugby League Association	Observer member: 2013–2024	
Solomon Islands	Solomon Islands Rugby League Federation	Observer Member: 2011–2025	
Trinidad and Tobago	Trinidad and Tobago Rugby League	Observer member: ????–2024	

== See also ==
- Geography of rugby league
