= List of international rugby football teams =

List of international rugby football teams may refer to:

- List of international rugby union teams
- List of International Rugby League members
