= Rugby in Bosnia and Herzegovina =

Rugby in Bosnia and Herzegovina may refer to:

- Rugby union in Bosnia and Herzegovina
- Rugby league in Bosnia and Herzegovina
