= 2018 Quidditch Premier League season =

- League: Quidditch Premier League
- Sport: Quidditch
- Duration: June 16 – August 25, 2018
- Number of games: 77
- Number of teams: 10

Regular season
- Season champions: North: West Midlands Revolution; South: London Monarchs
- Finals champions: London Monarchs
- Runners-up: Southeast Knights

Quidditch Premier League seasons
- ← 2017 2019 →

The 2018 Quidditch Premier League season was the league's second, and was contested by ten teams over the course of the summer of 2018. The ten teams were split into two divisions, with the North Division composed of the Northern Watch, Yorkshire Roses, East Midlands Archers, West Midlands Revolution, and the debuting Scottish Thistles, and the South Division composed of the London Monarchs, Southeast Knights, Southwest Broadside, Eastern Mermaids, and the debuting Welsh Dragons.

During the regular season, each division held three 'fixtures', which saw each team in that division attend and participate in round robin games. In total, teams played 12 games each during the regular season, with a total of 60 games played in total. Based on the results of those fixtures, the teams were seeded for the 2018 Quidditch Premier League Championship, which all ten qualified for. The championship was decided with a knockout bracket format

== Regular season ==
=== Divisional fixtures ===
A total of six fixtures were held across the UK, split between the North and South Divisions.

Location	Venue	Date
North Division
Manchester	Platt Fields Park	June 16, 2018
Edinburgh	The Meadows	July 14, 2018
Birmingham	Tally-Ho Ground	August 4, 2018
South Division
London	Clapham Common	June 23, 2018
Cambridge	Jesus Green	July 21, 2018
Reading	Palmer Park	August 11, 2018

=== Final Divisional Standings ===
Team	W	L	Goal Differential	Snitch Catches
North Division
West Midlands Revolution	10	2	82	8
East Midlands Archers	10	2	78	7
Northern Watch	7	5	19	6
Scottish Thistles	2	10	−72	7
Yorkshire Roses	1	11	-83	2
South Division
London Monarchs	12	0	125	9
Southeast Knights	9	3	70	5
Eastern Mermaids	6	6	-32	5
Welsh Dragons	2	10	−96	6
Southwest Broadside	1	11	−91	5

== Championship ==
The London Monarchs won the 2018 Quidditch Premier League Championship, played at the Arms Park Stadium in Cardiff, Wales, ending the season with a perfect 15–0 record. They defeated the Southeast Knights 160*-80 in the final match. By winning the title, the London Monarchs took the crown from the 2017 winners, the West Midlands Revolution.

The Championship format consisted of a double elimination bracket which was then split into upper and lower brackets, giving full placings from 1st to 10th. The latter stages of the upper bracket and lower bracket can be seen below.

=== Upper Bracket ===
Quarterfinals
London Monarchs	140*
Yorkshire Roses	40
Eastern Mermaids	120*^
East Midlands Archers	90
Southeast Knights	100*
Northern Watch	50
West Midlands Revolution	160*
Southwest Broadside	40

Semifinals
London Monarchs	190*
Eastern Mermaids	30
Southeast Knights	120*
West Midlands Revolution	50

Finals
London Monarchs	160*
Southeast Knights	80
Third Place
West Midlands Revolution	150*
Eastern Mermaids	70

=== Lower Bracket ===
Semifinals
1	Southwest Broadside	100*
4	Yorkshire Roses	90
3	East Midlands Archers	100*
2	Northern Watch	90

Fifth Place
Southwest Broadside	70*
East Midlands Archers	30
Seventh Place

== See also ==
- QuidditchUK
- International Quidditch Association
- Major League Quidditch
- Quidditch (sport)
- Fictional Quidditch
