= Crown Flatt =

Rugby league stadium in Yorkshire, England

Autex Acoustics Arena
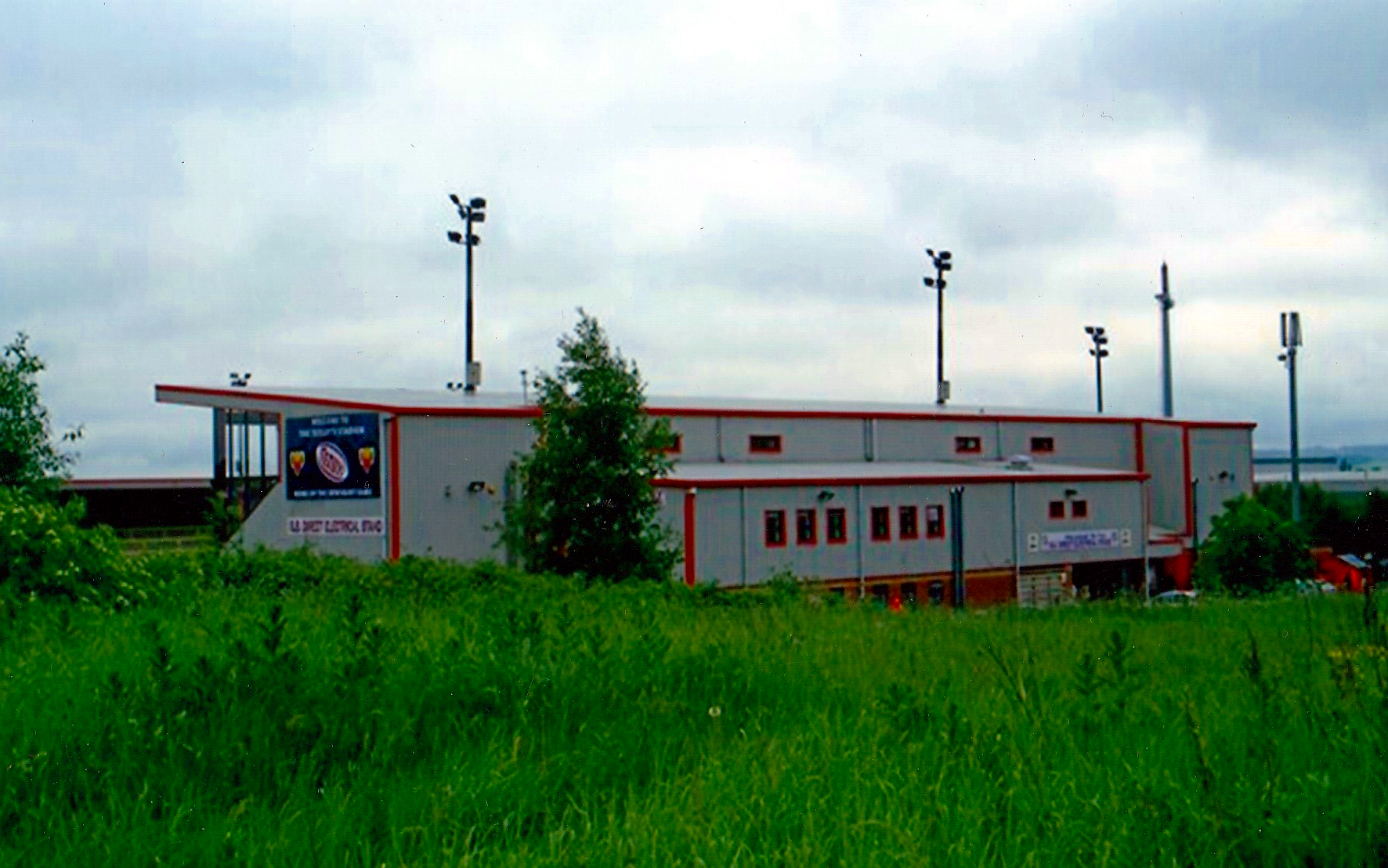
- Interactive map of Autex Acoustics Arena
- Location: Owl Lane, Dewsbury, West Yorkshire, WF12 7RH
- Capacity: 5,100
- Surface: Grass

Construction
- Groundbreaking: 1994
- Opened: 1994
- Renovated: 2026-
- Expanded: 2015, 2026-

Tenants
- Dewsbury Rams (1994–present); Bradford Bulls (2020–2021); Huddersfield Giants (2025) (2026) (2027–present)

Crown Flatt, currently known as the Autex Acoustics Arena for sponsorship purposes, is a rugby league stadium on Owl Lane in Dewsbury, West Yorkshire, England. It is the home ground of Super League club Huddersfield Giants and the Dewsbury Rams, who play in the Championship, the second tier of Rugby League in England. The ground occupies the site of the former Shaw Cross Colliery, which closed in August 1968.

Crown Flatt was also the name of Dewsbury's former stadium at a different site a mile or so away in the town which was Dewsbury's home ground from 1876 until 1991. It was severely damaged by an act of arson in 1988, and was demolished in 1991 to be replaced by a residential estate with the new stadium opening 3 years later in 1994.

In 2026, The Giants purchased the site and began a £10m+ regeneration and expansion programme to enable the ground to host Super League matches, The Rams will also share the facilities as non-paying tenants, the refurbished stadium will be multi-branded depending on which team will play home games.

== History ==
=== The original stadium ===
On 19 January 1876, Mr A. Fearnsides – a Savile estate tenant – had agreed to sub-let the field to Dewsbury Athletic and Football Club for an initial payment of £20 per year.

The earliest surviving reference to the Crown Flatt enclosure is the one goal to nil defeat by Leeds Caledonians on 22 January 1876.

In season 1879/1880 the ground acquired its first permanent structure - a wooden terrace occupying the top side of the estate. At around the same time, and at a cost of £250, the field acquired a perimeter wall, turnstiles, viewing platforms and a refreshment tent.

Improved changing facilities appeared during the 1884/85 campaign. "Noah’s Ark" - a 3,500-seater grandstand purchased from the Royal Agricultural Show at Preston for £170 was erected along the southern touchline in time for the visit of Morley on 26 September 1885. In 1890, Crown Flatt hosted its first international rugby union match when it was used as England's first venue after a two-year absence from the Home Nations Championship due to the RFU's refusal to join the International Rugby Board. This game is notable as it was the first occasion England had lost to Wales, with the only try scored by a Dewsbury player, Wales's 'Buller' Stadden.

In November 1897, the committee of Dewsbury and Savile Football and Athletic Club decided to abandon rugby union in favour of soccer and in mid-1898, to vacate Crown Flatt.

In September 1898 after rejecting an approach from the new Northern Union tenants, the Dewsbury and Savile committee received notice to remove their property from the ground before the end of the month. By 17 September both the wooden top stand and "Noah’s Ark" opposite had been dismantled and the remains were sold to the local Poor Law Union for use as firewood.

In the summer of 1936, Crown Flatt became the home of Dewsbury Royals Professional Baseball Club. However, attendance figures were very disappointing, and without the financial backing which other clubs received, Dewsbury could not attract quality foreign players and struggled to compete with the bigger clubs. The club was soon disbanded after the 1936 season.

Crown Flatt's only grandstand, built in 1914 - the other three sides of the ground remained open and largely undeveloped for many years - was destroyed in an act of arson on the evening of 13 September 1988, when three youths set fire to it. All the club's memorabilia and its documentary records, stored in the board room, were lost. Following the disaster, Dewsbury continued to play on at Crown Flatt for three more years, with a temporary metal stand being provided by local firm Duncan Developments, who subsequently bought the entire site for redevelopment and built the modern housing estate that stands there today, the streets of which are named after notable Dewsbury players. The ground staged its final first class game on 14 April 1991 when Barrow were held to a 19–19 draw. Dewsbury full-back Nathan Graham, with a late conversion, registered the last senior points to be scored at the ground. The club then spent three seasons ground-sharing with local rivals Batley at Mount Pleasant stadium.

The development and construction of a new stadium for Dewsbury was overseen by the club committee, with the first part of the work done by the then president David T Farrow JP who died in 1991, before he could see the new stadium completed.

=== New stadium ===
Dewsbury played their first home game at the newly built Crown Flatt stadium (often erroneously termed 'New Crown Flatt') on 6 September 1994 in front of a full house against Barrow, a match they won 76–8.

The Rams suffix was adopted by the club in 1996 as part of rugby league's transition from a winter to a summer schedule. Crown Flatt stadium was renamed Ram Stadium in 1998. In 2005, the stadium was renamed Tetley's Stadium for commercial sponsorship purposes.

The car parks to the south of the stadium hold one of the biggest car boot sales in the region, raising much needed revenue for the Community Trust run by the club.

In 2020 Bradford Bulls moved to the stadium to ground-share as Dewsbury's tenant, on an initial two-year deal.

In June 2025, Super League was played at Crown Flatt for the first time when Huddersfield Giants hosted Wigan Warriors due to the unavailability of the Giants' home pitch at Accu Stadium, the game was a classic with the Giants leading until the last play of the game where Wigan snatched a dramatic 22–18 win, the attendance of 4,182 broke the previous ground record attendance which stood at 4,068 for a Dewsbury game v Bradford Bulls in 2015. The Giants will once again use Crown Flatt as a temporary home in June 2026 when they host Toulouse Olympique, again, in the Super League.

Huddersfield Giants will move into the stadium permanently from the 2027 season, buying the ground and redeveloping it into an 8,000 capacity stadium.

On 4 November 2026, it was announced that the stadium would be sponsored by Autex Acoustics, who own NRL side New Zealand Warriors, and re-named the Autex Acoustics Arena for the 2027 season.

== Layout ==
=== North Stand ===
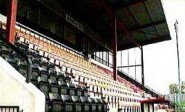
Seating stand at the stadium

Capacity- 900 (seated)
The stadium's main stand is completely covered and runs along the side of the pitch. It incorporates 900 seats, hospitality boxes, club administrative office and also the players' changing rooms, tunnel and team dugouts.

=== East Stand ===
Capacity- (standing)
The Beaumont terrace or Owl Lane End is the newest part of the stadium, having been completed in 2015. It is situated behind the posts and is uncovered terracing. It also houses the scoreboard. This terrace has since been named in honour of loyal fan Graham Beaumont, who died.

=== Mike Stephenson MBE Stand ===
Capacity- (standing)
The South Stand also known as The Mike Stephenson MBE Stand is the only area of standing terracing that is covered and runs along the side of the pitch. Originally just known as the South Stand it was renamed after former Dewsbury player, Mike Stephenson, in 2024.

=== West End ===
This is a simple grass bank, with no cover or stand, at the western end of the ground behind the posts. This area is not accessible to spectators, due to health and safety reasons. The club has aspirations to one day develop this area into an all-weather stand very much like the eastern Beaumont Terrace once finances allow.

== Rugby League Test matches ==
Crown Flatt hosted two rugby league internationals in its history.

Date	Team 1	Score	Team 2	Attendance	Competition
20 October 1995	Ireland	42–6	Morocco		1995 Rugby League Emerging Nations Tournament
20 November 2000	(United Kingdom) BARLA	20–14	Italy		2000 Rugby League Emerging Nations Tournament

== Sponsors ==
Year	Sponsor	Name
2005-2023	Tetley's Brewery	Tetley's Stadium
2023-2026	Flair Handling Systems Ltd	The FLAIR stadium
2026-present	Autex Acoustics	The Autex Acoustics Arena
