= 2017 Quidditch Premier League season =

First Quidditch Premier League season

- League: Quidditch Premier League
- Sport: Quidditch
- Duration: 17 June – 26 August 2017
- Number of games: 54
- Number of teams: 8

Regular season
- Season champions: North: West Midlands Revolution; South: Southeast Knights
- Finals champions: West Midlands Revolution
- Runners-up: Southeast Knights

Quidditch Premier League seasons
- 2018 →

The 2017 Quidditch Premier League season was the league's first, and was contested by eight teams over the course of the 2017 summer. The eight teams were split into two divisions, with the North Division composed of the Northern Watch, Yorkshire Roses, East Midlands Archers, and West Midlands Revolution, and the South Division composed of the London Monarchs, Southeast Knights, Southwest Broadside, and Eastern Mermaids.

During the regular season, each division held three 'fixtures', which saw each team in that division attend and participate in round robin games. In total, teams played 12 games each during the regular season, with a total of 36 games played in total. Based on the results of those fixtures, the teams were seeded for the QPL Championship, which all eight qualified for. The championship was decided with a series of double-elimination matches, with eliminated teams going on to contest the lower places of the standings.

== Regular season ==
=== Divisional fixtures ===
A total of six fixtures were held across the UK, split between the North and South Divisions.

Location	Venue	Date
North Division
Manchester	Platt Fields Park	1 July 2017
Sheffield	Bolehills Park	22 July 2017
Nottingham	Florence Boot Field	5 August 2017
South Division
London	Clapham Common	17 June 2017
Worcester	Upton Rugby Club	15 July 2017
Southampton	Millbrook Rugby Club	29 July 2017

=== Final divisional standings ===
Team	W	L	Goal differential	Snitch catches	Bludger possession
North Division
West Midlands Revolution	9	0	102	7	58%
Northern Watch	5	4	-5	6	53%
East Midlands Archers	2	7	-43	2	37%
Yorkshire Roses	2	7	−54	2	53%
South Division
Southeast Knights	9	0	73	8	55%
London Monarchs	6	3	70	6	66%
Southwest Broadside	3	6	-49	4	48%
Eastern Mermaids	0	9	−94	1	32%

== Championship ==
The West Midlands Revolution won the 2017 QPL Championship, played at the KCOM Craven Park Stadium in Hull, ending the season with a perfect 16–0 record. They defeated the Southeast Knights 140*-70 in the final match. By winning the title, the West Midlands Revolution became the inaugural winners of the Quidditch Premier League.

The Championship format consisted of a double elimination bracket which was then split into upper and lower brackets, giving full placings from 1st to 8th. The latter stages of the upper bracket and lower bracket can be seen below.

=== Upper bracket ===
Quarterfinals
West Midlands Revolution	240*
Southwest Broadside	0
London Monarchs	160
Yorkshire Roses	100*
Southeast Knights	180
Eastern Mermaids	60*
East Midlands Archers	110*
Northern Watch	60

Semifinals
West Midlands Revolution	140*
London Monarchs	30
Southeast Knights	210*
East Midlands Archers	30

Finals
West Midlands Revolution	140*
Southeast Knights	70
Third Place
London Monarchs	190*
East Midlands Archers	70

=== Lower bracket ===
Semifinals
1	Northern Watch	110*
4	Southwest Broadside	60
3	Yorkshire Roses	180*
2	Eastern Mermaids	60

Fifth Place
Yorkshire Roses	100*
Northern Watch	50
Seventh Place

== See also ==
- QuidditchUK
- International Quidditch Association
- Major League Quidditch
- Quidditch (sport)
- Fictional Quidditch
