= Rugby League Asian Championships =

International rugby league tournament

Asian Championship Rugby League
- Sport: Rugby league
- Formerly known as: Rugby League Asia Cup
- Instituted: 2025
- Number of teams: 4
- Region: Asia-Pacific
- Holders: Singapore (2025)
- Most titles: Singapore (1 title)

The Rugby League Asian Championship is an international rugby league competition for men's senior teams in East and South East Asia inaugurated in 2025.

A previous iteration of this tournament, the Asian Cup existed in 2012 and 2013 as a single game between the two competing nations. The Philippines won the inaugural edition, and retained the title the following year.

== Results ==
=== Asian Cup era ===
==== 2012 ====
21 October 2012

Thailand	0–86	Philippines
	Report

Royal Thai Police Stadium, Bangkok

==== 2013 ====
21 October 2013

Philippines	44–10	Thailand
	Report

Philippine Merchant Marine Academy Field, San Narciso, Zambales
Attendance: 1,500

=== Asian Championships era ===
==== 2025 ====
===== Semi-finals =====
27 November 2025
4:00pm (local time)

Japan	4–48	Singapore
	Report

International School Manilla Philippines
Referee: Rami Abu-Mansour

27 November 2025
6:30pm (local time)

Philippines	44–10	Hong Kong
	Report

International School Manilla Philippines
Referee: Salvatore Marigliano

===== Third place play-off =====
29 November 2025
3:00pm (local time)

Japan	34–30†	Hong Kong
	Report

International School Manilla Philippines
Referee: Rami Abu-Mansour

===== Final =====
29 November 2025
5:45pm (local time)

Singapore	62–0†	Philippines
	Report

International School Manilla Philippines
Referee: Salvatore Marigliano

== See also ==
- RLIF World Rankings
- List of International Rugby League Teams
- European Cup
- Mediterranean Cup
- Pacific Cup
- Rugby League Asian Championships
- East Asia Rugby League Nations Cup
