= Craven Park, Hull =

Rugby League stadium in Kingston upon Hull, England

Craven Park
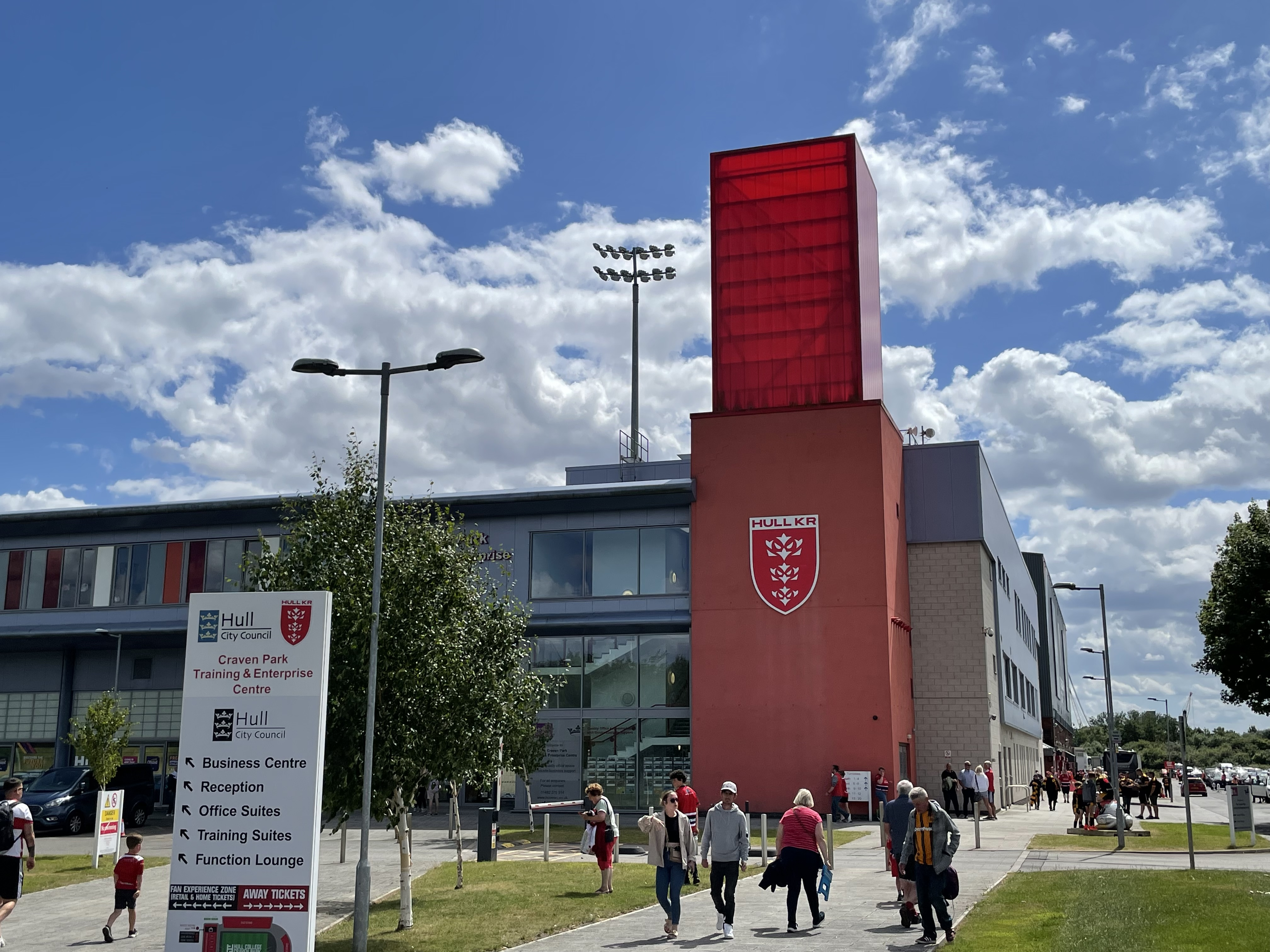
- Interactive map of Craven Park
- Former names: MS3 Craven Park; KC/KCOM Lightstream Stadium; KCOM Craven Park; Hull College Craven Park
- Location: Kingston upon Hull, East Riding of Yorkshire, HU9 5HE, England
- Coordinates: 53°45′14″N 0°15′53″W
- Owner: Hull Kingston Rovers
- Capacity: 11,000
- Surface: Grass

Construction
- Opened: 1989

Tenants
- Hull Kingston Rovers (1989–present); Hull Vikings (1995–2005); Hull United (2015–2016)

Craven Park (currently known as the Sewell Group Craven Park Stadium for sponsorship reasons) is a rugby league stadium located in Kingston upon Hull, East Riding of Yorkshire, England. It is the home of Hull Kingston Rovers, one of two professional rugby league teams based in the city.

== History ==
Hull Kingston Rovers moved to the new ground in 1989 from Old Craven Park, which was sited on Holderness Road. The new stadium, costing £4 million (equivalent to £10,584,000 in 2025) to build, was the first in Rugby League to offer hospitality boxes. The first match was played against Trafford Borough on 24 September, with a full capacity 8,500 crowd a 48-8 first victory at the new stadium.

Ahead of the 2006 season, Craven Park's pitch was relaid and widened by 11 metres (36 ft) with the removal of the greyhound and speedway track used by Hull Vikings since 1995, with Hull Kingston Rovers looking to make substantial improvements up to Super League standard as they sought a return to the top flight of English rugby league. Plans for Hull Kingston Rovers to move from Craven Park to a new purpose-built rugby league stadium to be constructed at a new, unconfirmed site were suggested in 2007, but shortly after this, Hull City Council, in partnership with Kingston Community Developments Limited and Hull Kingston Rovers, announced that terms for lease agreements had been reached to support the long-term future of Craven Park. These terms enabled investment and development of the stadium to move forward.

The initial phase of redeveloping Craven Park was the lease purchase of a temporary seated north stand from Wentworth Golf Club, replacing the use of the inadequate south terrace for visiting away fans. Hull Kingston Rovers' second season in the Super League in 2008 coincided with work beginning on the extension of the standing terraced East Stand. This extension increased the capacity of the stand by 1,120 bringing its overall capacity to 4,750. A similar extension to the opposite end of the stand, which would have increased the capacity again by 1,200, was planned in 2009, but this expansion was placed on hold in 2011 as construction of a new North Stand took priority.

Construction work on the new £8.2 million mixed facilities North Stand began in 2012 following the removal of the temporary Wentworth Golf Club stand. The new stand was initially projected to be completed halfway through the 2013 season with the opening match set to be a Hull FC derby, however disputes between the club, Hull City Council and construction managers NPS saw the opening delayed to 2014. The disputes saw the North Stand cladded in sky blue rather than red as originally planned and club director Neil Hudgell fearing the stand would become a "glorified office block". Following its opening, the new North Stand was named the 'Colin Hutton North Stand' as a tribute to the former Hull KR coach and the Great Britain national rugby league team coach.

A new attendance record was set at Craven Park in 2018, beating the previous record of 11,181 in the season opener against the Leeds Rhinos in 2015. 12,090 spectators attended the stadium to watch cross city rivals Hull FC defeat Hull Kingston Rovers in a Good Friday derby.

A floodlight collapse in November 2018 saw Hull Kingston Rovers declare a 'major incident' and relocate players and staff to the University of Hull for off-season training. One pre-season match in 2019 was relocated and the club returned to Craven Park in late January using a temporary floodlight.

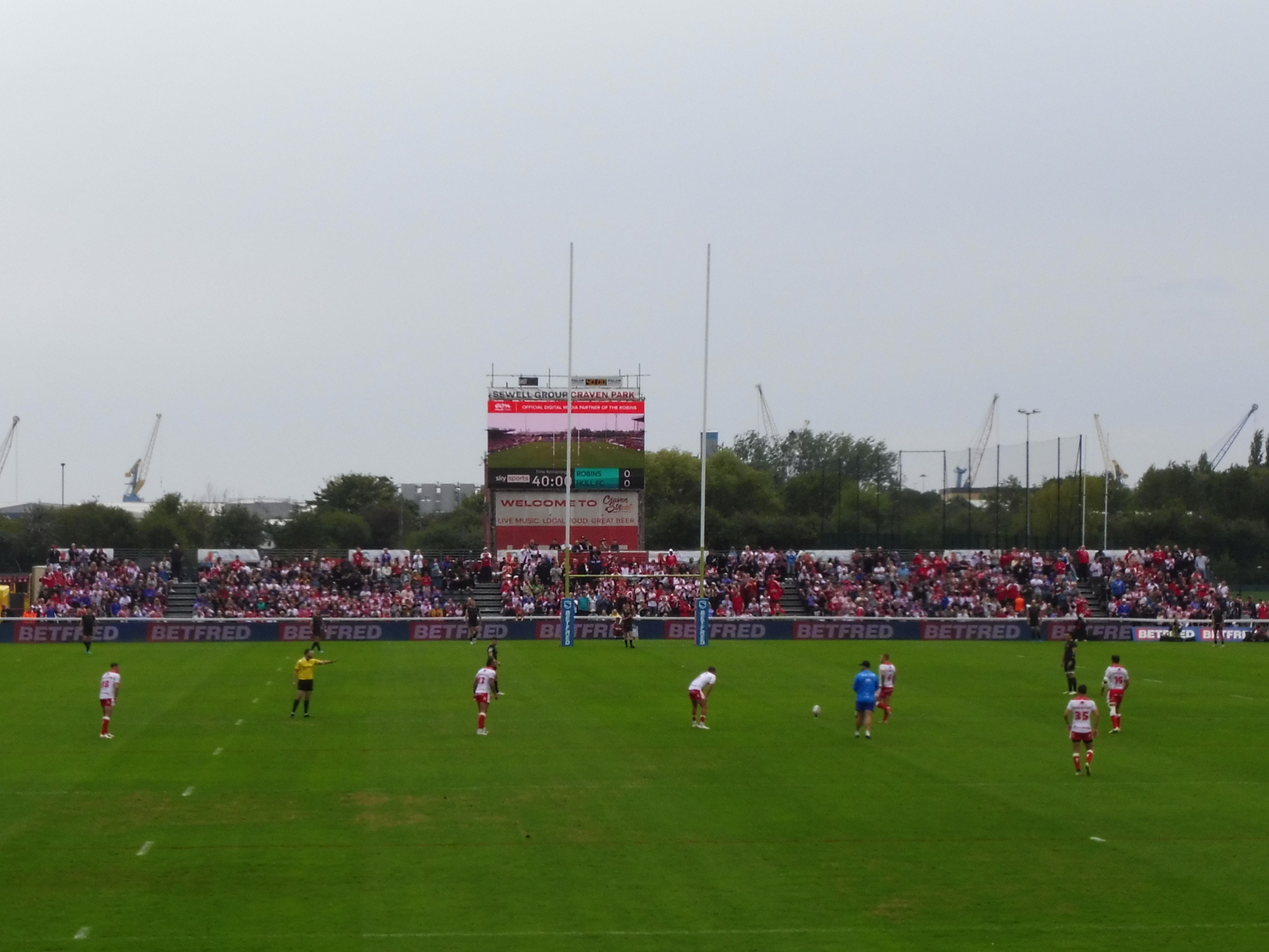
The temporary seated South Stand in use in September 2025

The COVID-19 pandemic saw all Super League teams play behind closed doors at two neutral venues for a majority of the 2020 season and two rounds of the 2021 season, with only a handful of matches being played with no fans at Craven Park in 2021. When crowds returned to season ticket holders only in May 2021, initial restrictions on crowd capacity saw the club erect a temporary seated stand over the disused South Stand, allowing a socially-distanced capacity of 6,000. The temporary stand was removed following the lifting of social distancing restrictions and replaced with a food and entertainment area on the site named 'Craven Streat'; another 1,000-seat temporary stand was erected in September 2024 due to very high ticket demand ahead of Hull KR's last regular match of the 2024 Super League season, and was reinstated again in August 2025 due to consecutive home sellouts during the 2025 Super League season.

=== Ownership ===
Craven Park and the adjacent land surrounding the stadium had previously been owned and operated by both Hull City Council and Kingston Community Developments Ltd, who had held a 250-year lease of the stadium, since Hull Kingston Rovers was rescued from administration in 2000. Following a period of negotiations between the club and Hull City Council, Hull Kingston Rovers purchased full ownership of the stadium in March 2022, with the option to purchase 15 acres of surrounding land also included in the deal.

With Craven Park under the ownership of Hull Kingston Rovers, the club has begun redeveloping or improving parts of the ground. The Roger Millward West Stand is planned to be demolished and replaced with a new structure capable of hosting corporate facilities, while further plans were submitted in June 2025 for the development of a sports village on land to the east of the stadium, which will include three new rugby league training pitches, indoor netball and basketball and outdoor padel courts, and a retail park along Preston Road with 400 car parking spaces.

On 10 December 2025, Poorhouse Lane, the single access road to Craven Park from Preston Road, was renamed to Phil Lowe Way, with special red and white street signs installed by Hull City Council to replace the standard black and white signs.

== Layout ==
=== RSV Colin Hutton North Stand ===
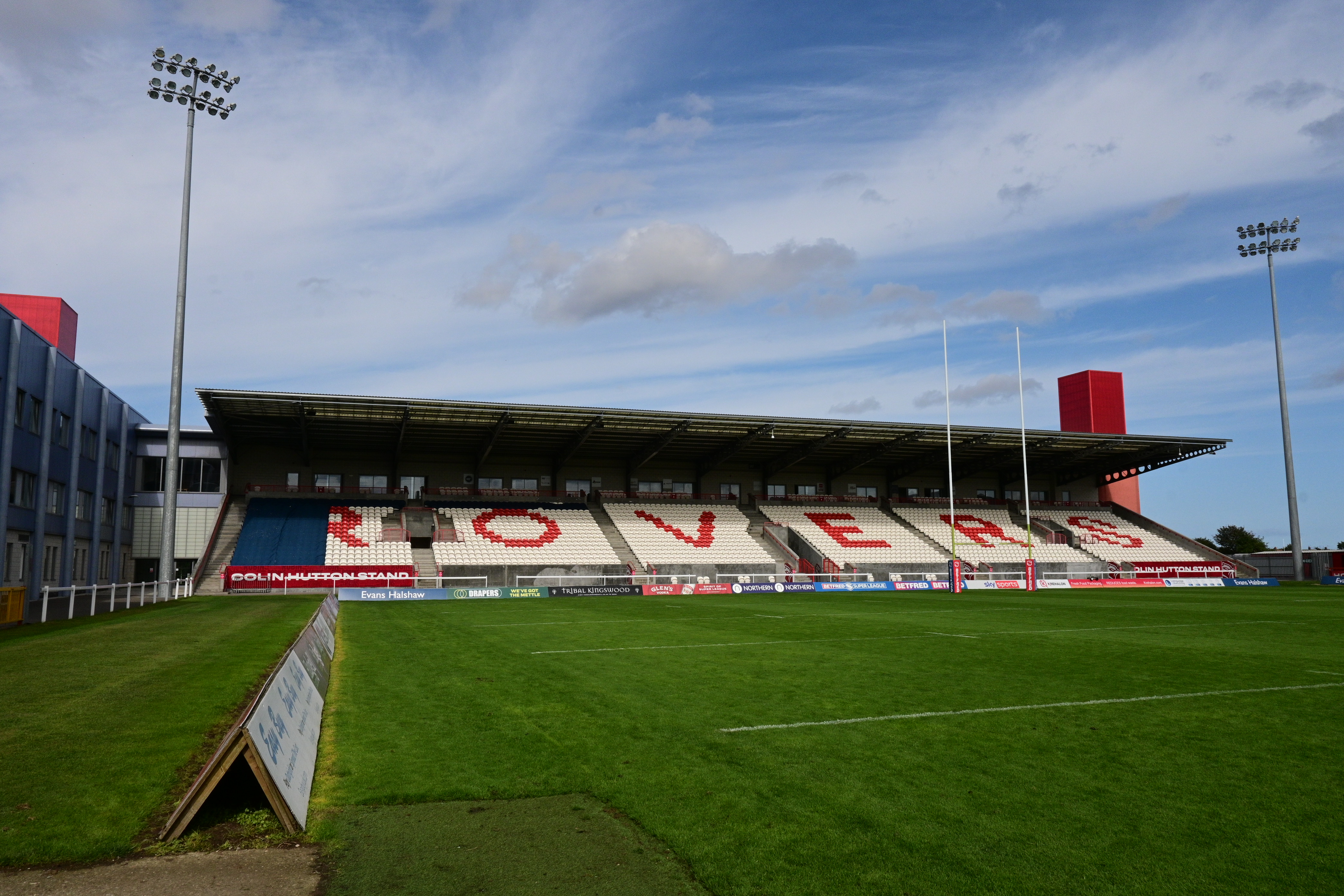
RSV Colin Hutton North Stand

Capacity- 2,600 (seated)
The North Stand was originally a temporary stand from Wentworth Golf Club that was erected after the ground ceased being used as a speedway and greyhound racing venue. In 2013, the new £8 million Colin Hutton North Stand opened for the 2013 Rugby League World Cup game between Papua New Guinea and France. The North Stand also houses the Enterprise Business Centre and Training Centre. There are 42 fully furnished offices which make up the Enterprise Units, all of which are located on different floors within the North Stand.

=== Roger Millward West Stand ===
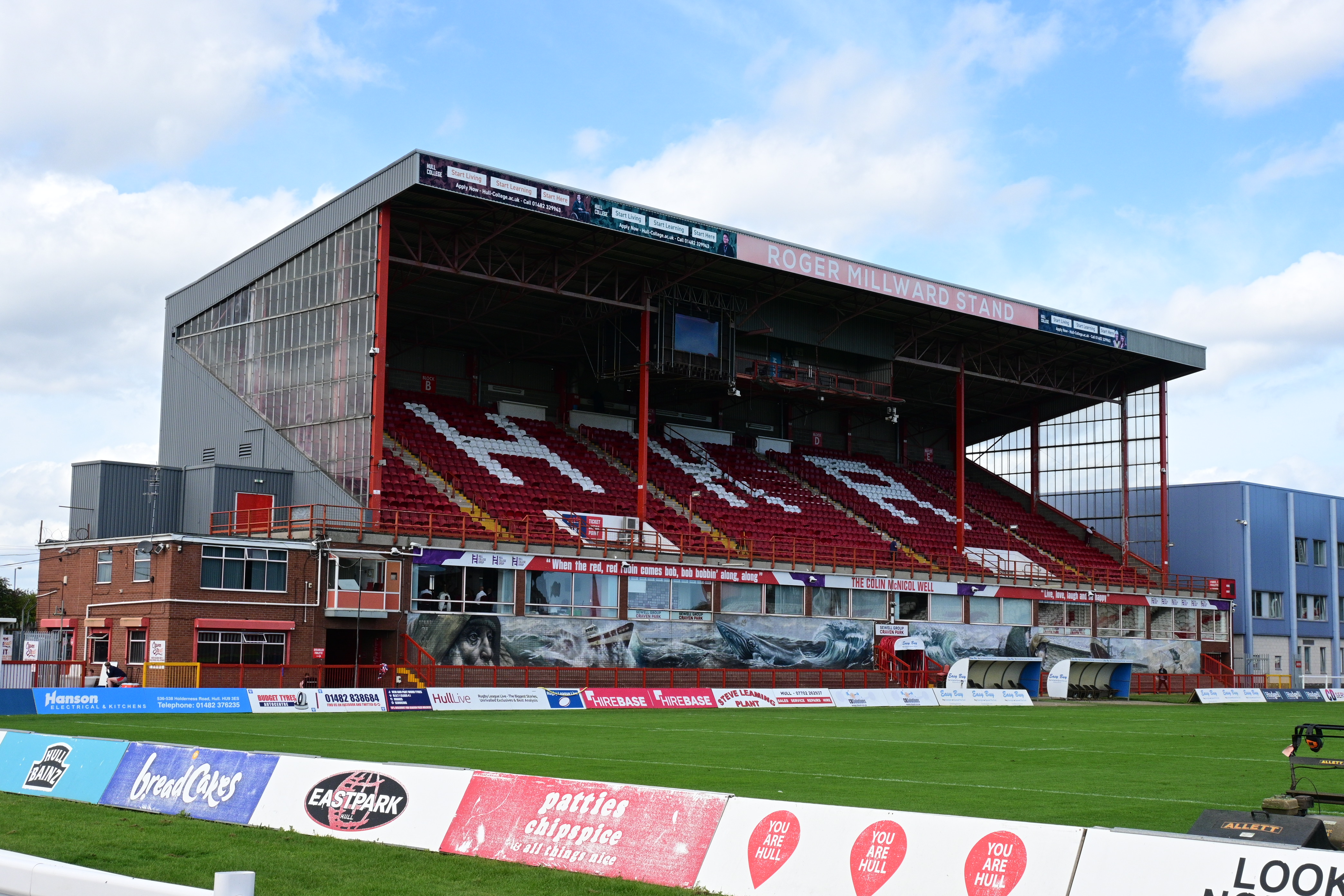
Roger Millward West Stand

Capacity- 2,800, (seated)
The West Stand, also named after the club's greatest player Roger Millward, includes the main seated stand a small terraced area, 'The Colin McNicol Well', below executive boxes, which holds around 500 fans and is also home to a large mural, painted in 2018, that celebrates Hull's maritime heritage. The stand houses the stadium's main changing rooms that were redeveloped before the 2014 season to improve the size and facilities of the changing room. Inside the stand there is The Robins Nest, Flanagan's Bar, named after former player Peter Flanagan and The Harry Poole Bar for home and away fans. This is a restaurant with pitch-side views and exclusive player and coach interviews after a match. The stand also houses the TV gantry.

=== Wow Hydrate East Stand ===
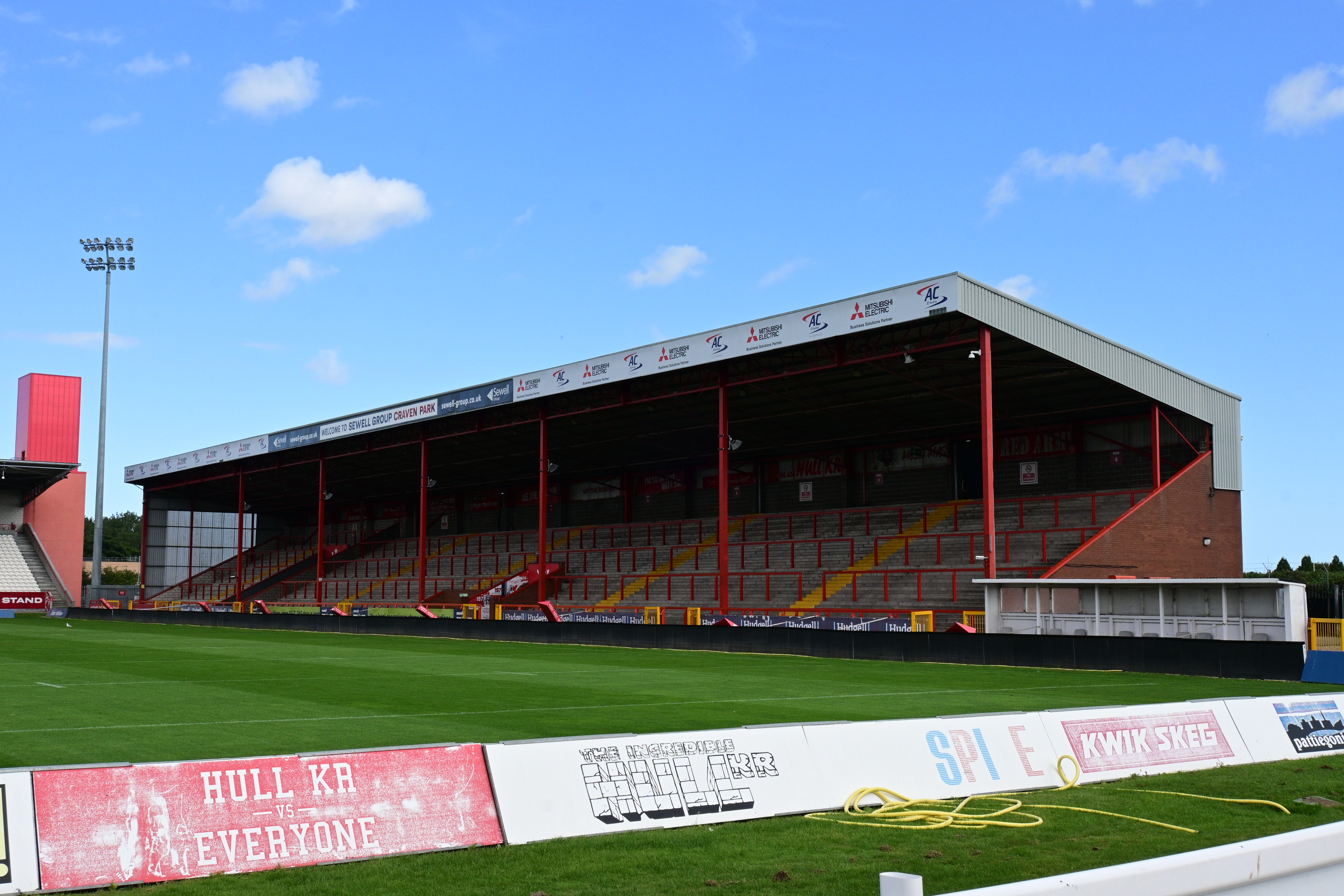
Wow Hydrate East Stand

Capacity- (standing) + 1,000 seated
The East Stand is a covered terrace that runs almost the full length of the pitch. The north side of the stand was extended in 2008, and the south side is due to be extended by January 2025; an extension of the terraces was initially placed on hold in 2011 due to the development of the North Stand, however the club announced in September 2024 that as a result of high demand for tickets pushing Craven Park towards full capacity, a temporary new seating area, featuring improved wheelchair facilities and a capacity of up to 1,000 fans, is to be built on the south side of the stand. This stand will be used for the duration of the 2025 Super League season, after which a £1.5 million permanent extension to the East Stand will be carried out during 2026.

=== 'Craven Streat' ===
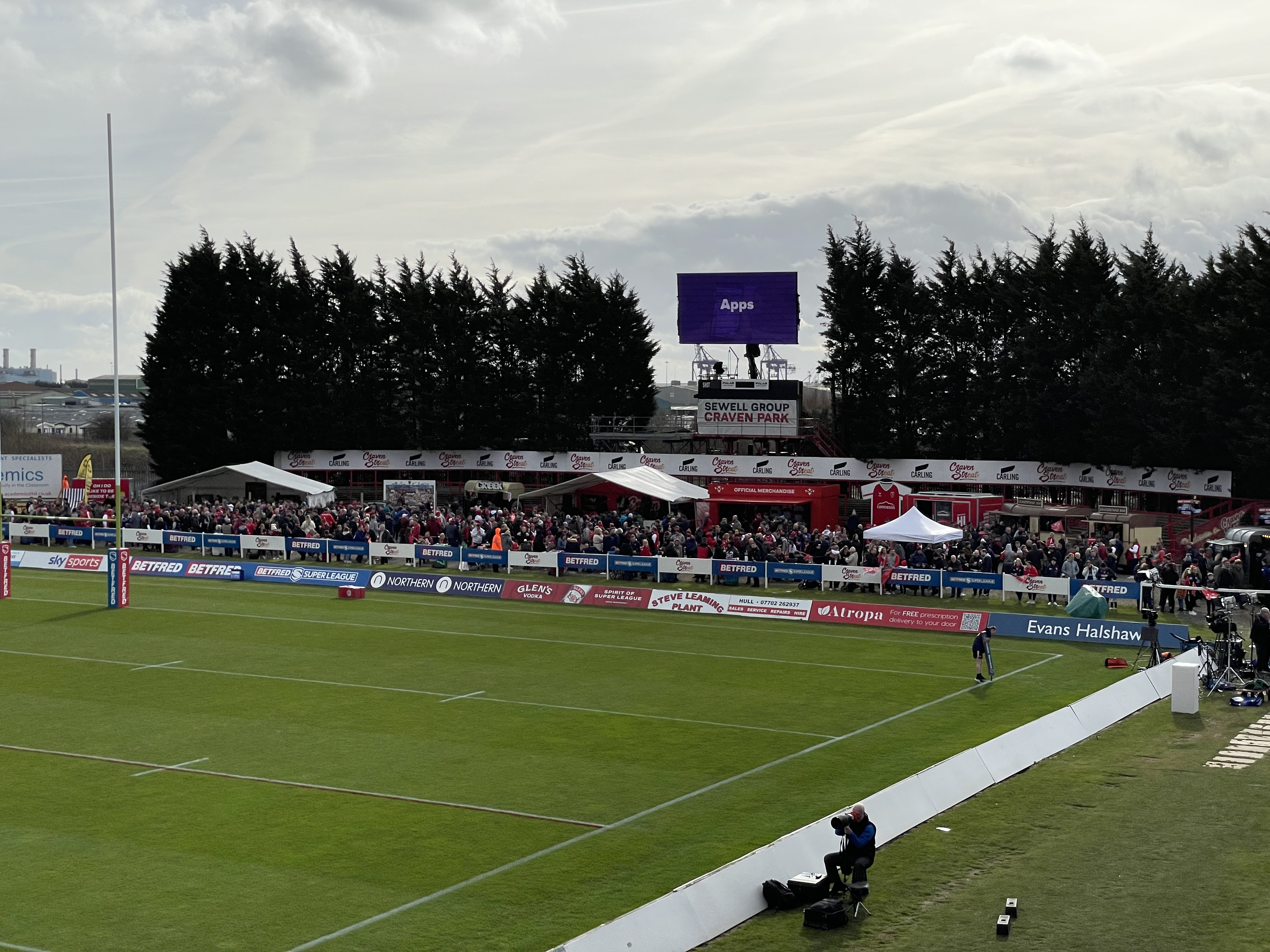
'Craven Streat', situated on the South Terrace

Previously a small bank of terracing at the south end of the ground, which was demolished ahead of the 2025 season, 'Craven Streat', established in 2021, offers live stage entertainment, a marquee with bars, street food and a big screen, inspired by the fan park of Canadian Super League expansion team Toronto Wolfpack's Lamport Stadium and American football tailgate parties. The name references the Craven Street Football Ground, the site of Hull Kingston Rovers' first rugby league matches.

Following the completion of the North Stand and Enterprise Centre, the club initially proposed in 2015 to build a new South Stand with an adjoining hotel to replace the disused terracing. In August 2024, work began on the construction of a 3G pitch on the site of the South Terrace and adjoining parking area, part of a new sports campus set to include new team training facilities, a gym and a lecture hall. Expansions for 'Craven Streat' were later announced a month later due to extension work on the East Stand taking up some of the fan park's footprint.

== Naming rights ==
In 2011, local data communications company MS3 announced it had secured a five-year deal for the naming rights of Craven Park, the first such deal in the club's history. Fans of Hull Kingston Rovers voted on adopting either the name MS3 Craven Park or MS3 Stadium, with the vote resulting in the stadium being renamed MS3 Craven Park.

On 25 January 2014, Hull Kingston Rovers announced that it had secured a new stadium naming rights partnership with local communications provider, KC. Under a five-year agreement, Craven Park was renamed the KC Lightstream Stadium (following rebranding, it became the KCOM Lightstream Stadium), not to be confused with the KCOM Stadium in the west of the city. On 3 February 2017, it was renamed again, and was then known as KCOM Craven Park.

On 21 August 2019, Hull Kingston Rovers announced a new partnership with Hull College, which saw the stadium renamed to Hull College Craven Park Stadium. This partnership also helped provide new training opportunities for academy players, as well as allowing Hull Kingston Rovers players to pursue degrees at the college.

On 18 January 2022, Hull Kingston Rovers announced a new name for Craven Park after confirming a two-year partnership with the Sewell Group. The deal saw the stadium renamed to Sewell Group Craven Park.

Years	Sponsor	Name
2011–2014	MS3	MS3 Craven Park
2014–2016	KCOM	KCOM Lightstream Stadium
2017–2019	KCOM	KCOM Craven Park
2019–2022	Hull College	Hull College Craven Park Stadium
2022–	Sewell Group	Sewell Group Craven Park

== Other usage ==
=== Concerts ===
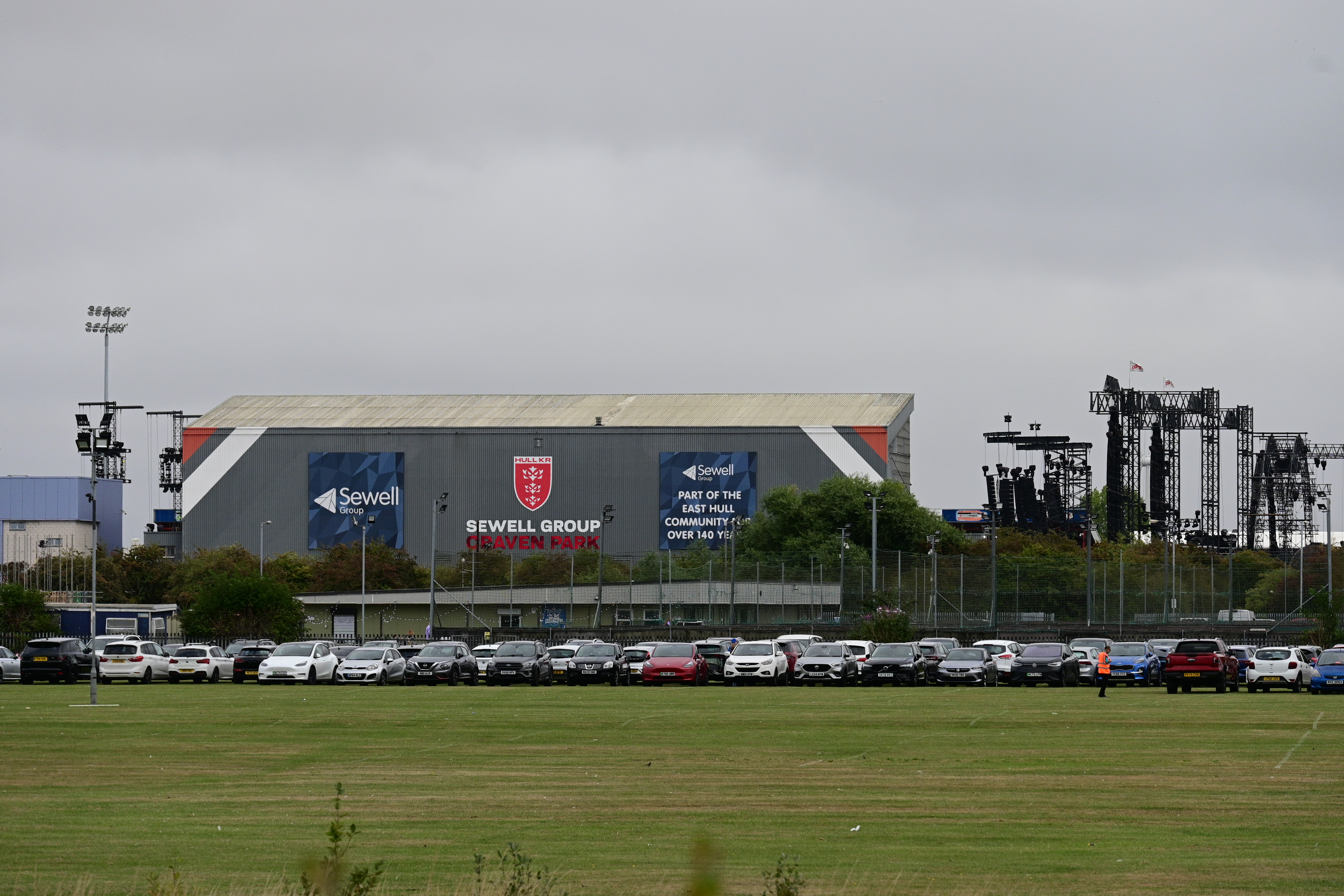
The exterior of Craven Park prior to a Coldplay concert in August 2025

Craven Park hosted its first concert in 2017, with 20,000 attending a concert starring The Housemartins and The Beautiful South's lead vocalists Paul Heaton and Jacqui Abbott on 3 June, supported by guests Billy Bragg and The Divine Comedy.

English girl group Little Mix first performed at Craven Park to a crowd of 20,000 in July 2018 as part of their "Summer Hits Tour". They were originally scheduled to perform again in June 2020 until the COVID-19 pandemic forced the 2020 tour's cancellation.

Irish boy band Westlife were scheduled to perform at Craven Park on 10 July 2020 for their reunion "Stadiums in the Summer Tour" before the tour was cancelled due to the COVID-19 pandemic. Sir Tom Jones was also scheduled to perform at Craven Park on 13 June 2020, however the concert was initially cancelled, then rescheduled to 4 September 2021.

English pop singer Rod Stewart performed at Craven Park on 4 July 2023, supported by pop band Culture Club, as part of the singer's 2023 UK tour. They were followed two days later by rock band The Who, who performed alongside a live orchestra at Craven Park on the first UK date of their "The Who Hits Back!" tour, supported by reggae/pop band UB40, on 6 July.

English-Welsh-Scottish rock band Coldplay performed two nights at Craven Park on 18-19 August 2025, supported by Hullensian rapper Chiedu Oraka and Nigerian singer-songwriter Ayra Starr on both nights, as part of their 2025 final UK leg of the Music of the Spheres World Tour. The concerts, announced on 17 September 2024 as their only European dates for 2025 outside of Wembley Stadium, saw 10% of ticket proceeds from each night donated to the Music Venues Trust, with Hull being picked for the tour for "its authenticity, working-class roots, and passionate spirit".

=== Association football ===
On 21 October 2015, it was announced that Non-League football team Hull United A.F.C. will play their home games at the stadium.

=== Greyhound racing ===
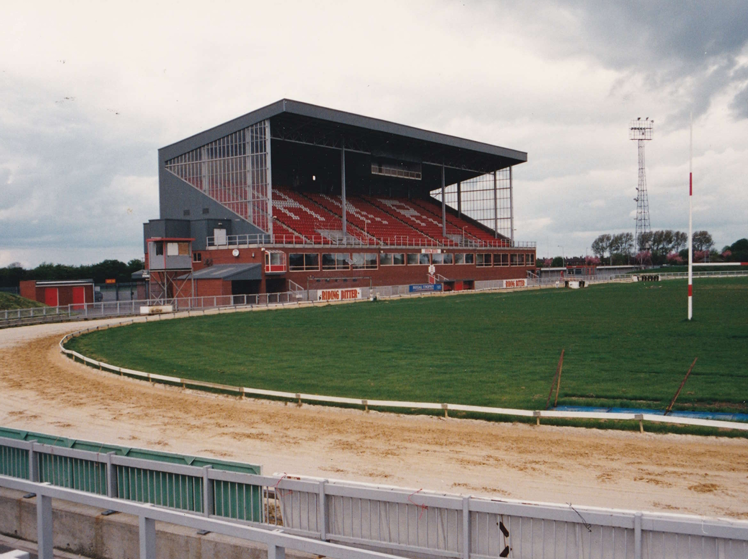
The speedway and greyhound racing track at Craven Park in 1995

The greyhound racing operation followed Hull Kingston Rovers to their new home from Old Craven Park after it closed in 1989. The first race meeting was held on 11 November 1989. The management team of John Kennedy and Roy Thickett had overseen the move and set up racing for Monday, Thursday and Saturday nights. The new circuit had a circumference of 415 metres and race distances of 290, 462, 490, 655 & 705 metres. Prentice Racing came in as new promoters during the nineties but the racing switched to the Boulevard Stadium in 2003. Both the speedway and greyhound tracks were grassed over.

Track records

Distance yards	Greyhound	Time	Date
240	Curaghator Lad	14.71	12 May 1998
290	Handsome Dan	17.57	23 November 1989
462	Gulleen Darkie	28.65	5 February 1990
490	Bally Fever	30.22	1989
490	Macsea Tom	30.05	17 May 1990
655	Appleby Lantern	41.43	5 March 1990
655	Fearless Misty	41.24	2002
705	Hot News	45.00	1989
705	Dalcash Duke	44.98	12 July 1990
875	Supporting Blue	57.67	29 November 1990
875	Spenwood Gem	57.37	15 July 2001
1070	Ridgefield Dream	72.00	20 March 1997

=== Rugby League Challenge Cup ===
On 28 January 2025, after it was agreed that Johnny Whiteley Park in Gipsyville was unsuitable to hold a fixture against a professional rugby league team, Craven Park was announced as the replacement host venue for West Hull A.R.L.F.C., an amateur team who play in the National Conference League, for their 2025 Challenge Cup third round fixture against Super League team St Helens. A total of 1,900 pre-booked tickets had been sold in the days leading up to the match on 8 February, however kick-off was delayed by 15 minutes due to stadium officials having to open the stadium gates and allow free admission to large numbers of fans wanting to buy tickets, which eventually saw over 5,000 fans attending the match.

Game	Date	Result	Attendance	Notes
2025; Round 3	8 February 2025	St Helens def. West Hull A.R.L.F.C. 38–0	5,000+	

=== Speedway ===
Speedway arrived in 1995 hosting the Hull Vikings but finished in 2005.

=== Boxing ===
In 2015, Craven Park hosted the 'Rumble on the Humber', where after ten rounds, Olympic gold medalist Luke Campbell defeated local rival Tommy Coyle, with crowds numbering around about 15,000.

=== Quidditch ===
On 26 August 2017, Craven Park hosted the first ever Championship fixture of the Quidditch Premier League. The fixture involved eight teams from two regional divisions (North Division and South Division), and the winners were the West Midlands Revolution.

== Rugby league internationals ==
Craven Park has hosted five rugby league internationals.

The list of international rugby league matches played at Craven Park is:

Game#	Date	Result	Attendance	Notes
1	15 November 2000	Morocco def. Japan 12–8		2000 Rugby League Emerging Nations Tournament
2	3 November 2012	England def. France 44–6	7,173	2012 England vs France
3	27 October 2013	France def. Papua New Guinea 9–8	7,481	2013 Rugby League World Cup Group B
4	4 November 2013	Samoa def. Papua New Guinea 38–4	6,871	2013 Rugby League World Cup Group B
5	28 October 2016	Australia def. Scotland 54–12	5,337	2016 Rugby League Four Nations
