= Malta Rugby League =

Sports governing body in Malta

- Founded: 1 September 2008
- ERL affiliation: 2013 (Affiliate)
- Responsibility: Malta

(Malta)

Malta Rugby League (MRL) is the governing body for the sport of rugby league football in Malta. The organisation was established in 2008 following a merger of between the Maltese Rugby League Association (formed in Australia in 2004) and Kumitat Nazzjonali ta Rugby League f'Malta (2006).

The MRL was awarded affiliate member status of the European Rugby League (ERL) in 2013, (Note: Known as the Rugby League European Federation (RLEF) at the time) and it is also an affiliate member of the International Rugby League (IRL). The MRL is also a member of the Kunsill Malti ghall-iSport (KMS) - the national organisation responsible for supporting, developing and promoting sport throughout Malta and Gozo.

== See also ==
- Rugby league in Malta
- Malta national rugby league team
