= Quidditch Premier League =

Sports league

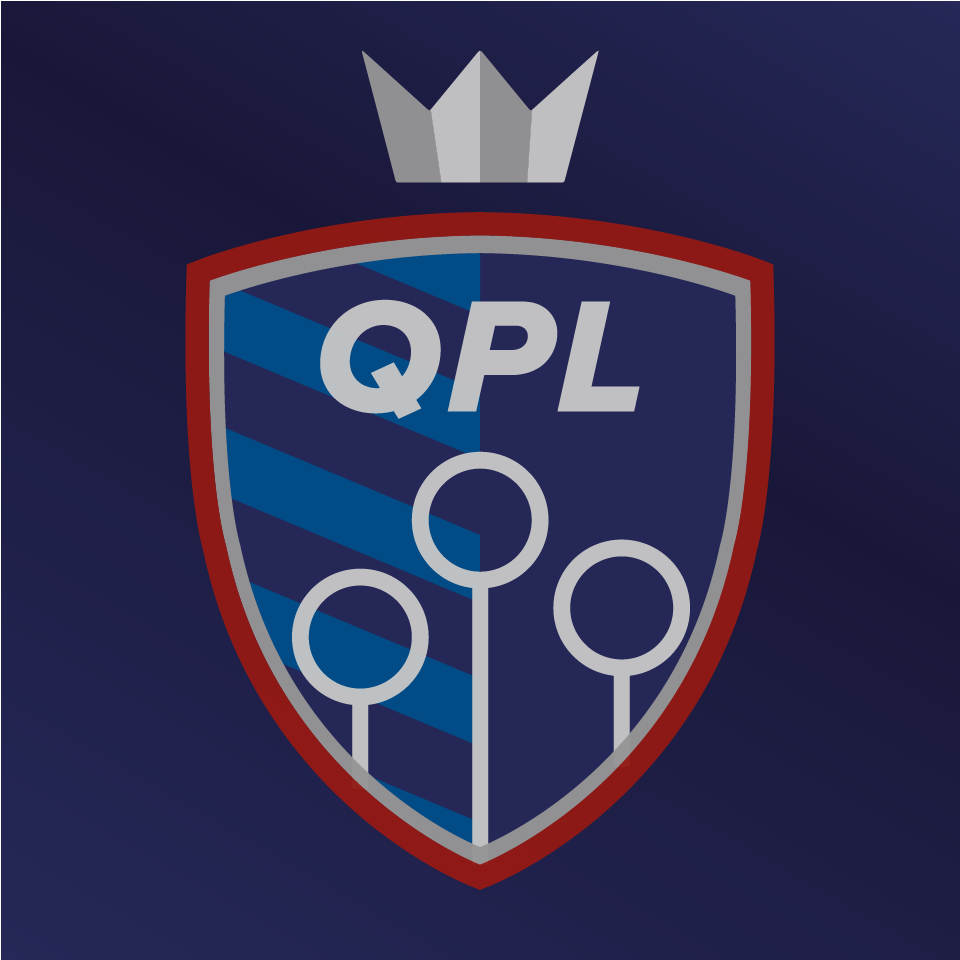
- Sport: Quidditch
- Founded: 15 November 2016
- Folded: 2019
- Director: Jack Lennard
- Divisions: UK North; UK Central; UK South; European
- No. of teams: 17
- Countries: United Kingdom; France; Belgium; The Netherlands; Germany
- Last champion: East Midlands Archers (2019)
- Most titles: West Midlands Revolution (1); London Monarchs (1); East Midlands Archers (1)
- Sponsors: SAVAGE The Ultimate Apparel Company; Epione Medical Supplies
- Website: QPL Official Website

The Quidditch Premier League (QPL) was an elite quidditch league that represents the sport in the United Kingdom, France, Belgium, The Netherlands, and Germany. The league was composed of seventeen teams - four in each of the UK North Division, the UK Central Division, and the UK South Division, and five in the European Division. The QPL season ran from June to August every year, with each team playing three divisional fixtures in the regular season. The playoffs included all seventeen teams competing in either Division 1 or Division 2 the QPL Championship fixture in late August, with the winning team being named as the QPL Champions for that season.

== History ==
The Quidditch Premier League was founded in November 2016 by Jack Lennard in hopes of developing quidditch further during the summer months in the UK's off-season. Lennard was the current Director of the League. The QPL was launched live on Sky News Sunrise and immediately gained international attention, with appearances in BBC News, ITV News, and even a mention on Conan. The first season debuted in June 2017, and saw the West Midlands Revolution crowned as the inaugural champions. In September 2017, two new teams were added; the Welsh Dragons, in the South Division, and the Scottish Thistles, in the North Division. These represented the first national Scottish and Welsh quidditch teams. The 2018 League was once contested across 3 fixtures in each division, followed by a championship at Cardiff Arms Park. The winners were the London Monarchs, who swept the board with an unbeaten season; the Southeast Knights finished as runners-up, and the 2017 champions, the West Midlands Revolution, came third. Before the 2018 season commenced, it was announced that the Quidditch Premier League would be establishing a European Division with five teams for the 2019 season. The new teams were based in Paris, Lille, Brussels, Amsterdam, and Cologne., and it was also announced a further two UK teams would be debuting in 2019, based in London and North West/North East England which would have seen the two UK divisions become three, however the league ceased permanently during the Covid-19 pandemic, the QPL's last operational season, 2019, with no plans to restart it.

== Competition format ==
The teams held tryouts in their respective catchment areas during February of each year to select their squads of 25 players. Teams that shared catchment areas, such as the London teams, the Northern teams, and the European teams, held joint tryouts followed by a draft for prospective players. Each season featured twelve divisional fixtures, three for each division, in June, July, and August, where all the teams in that division gathered to play a round-robin format. The Championship fixture, held at a professional sports stadium, took place at the end of August, and featured all seventeen teams split across two Divisions based on divisional standings, and was a knockout event. Previous Championships were held at Craven Park Stadium, Hull and Arms Park Stadium, Cardiff.

== Teams ==
| Team | Catchment Area | Debut Season |
UK North Division
| Yorkshire Roses | Yorkshire and the Humber | 2017 |
| Northern Watch | North West and North East England | 2017 |
| Northern Angels | North West and North East England | 2019 |
| Scottish Thistles | Scotland | 2018 |
UK Central Division
| Eastern Mermaids | East of England | 2017 |
| Welsh Dragons | Wales | 2018 |
| West Midlands Revolution | West Midlands | 2017 |
| East Midlands Archers | East Midlands | 2017 |
UK South Division
| London Monarchs | Greater London | 2017 |
| London Lions | Greater London | 2019 |
| Southeast Knights | South East England | 2017 |
| Southwest Broadside | South West England | 2017 |
European Division
| Paris Lumières | Continental Europe | 2019 |
| Brussels Atoms | Continental Europe | 2019 |
| Amsterdam Pride | Continental Europe | 2019 |
| Cologne Talons | Continental Europe | 2019 |
| Lille Géants | Continental Europe | 2019 |

== See also ==
- QuidditchUK
- International Quidditch Association
- Major League Quidditch
- Quidditch (sport)
- Fictional Quidditch
