= Rugby league in the West Indies =

Rugby league is a team sport which is growing in popularity in the West Indies.

== Popularity ==
=== Participation ===
Rugby league participation in the Caribbean has only been possible as recently as 2005, with the introduction of the JRLA National Preimership. Despite the sports early beginnings, it has proved to be a large success, surpassing the most optimistic hopes of the games administrators.

The sport is most popular among young male adults. Currently, Jamaica is the only country to have a competition and enough interest to sustain future events. However, there are plans to bring similar competitions to the islands of Trinidad and Tobago.

=== Current Trends ===
Plans to run the first Caribbean rugby league competition had to be brought forward 12 months in 2005 because of the large amounts of interest shown in the sport. The sport in Jamaica is making good in roads which consists of 5 teams split into two divisions in the National Premiership.

== The National Team ==
The West Indies rugby league team (nicknamed "The Wahoos") represents the Caribbean and the West Indies region in the sport of rugby league.

== History ==
The West Indies were first introduced to Rugby League with the formation of the West Indies Rugby League Federation in 2003. One of the first things the WIRLF did was to find and invite league players from England who had a Caribbean background to join the West Indies team in future representative competitions.

The first games to be played by the West Indies team was the Middlesex Nines in 2004. Later in 2004 and 2005 they would also compete in the York Nines competition. The first thirteen-a-side game the West Indies played was against the South African Wild Dogs in London, September 24, 2004.

During 2005 the first local rugby league competition in the Caribbean took place in Jamaica, which is being hailed as a huge success for the WIRLF. The competition consists of the Vauxhall Vultures, Duhaney Park Sharks, Olympic Angels and the Jamaica Defence Force Warriors.

== Jamaica Rugby League Association National Premiership ==
The JRLA National Premiership currently (2006) consists of five teams:

- The Duhaney Park Sharks
- The Vaxhaull Vultures
- The Olympic Garden Angels
- The Army (Jamaica Defence Force) Warriors
- The Jamaica Constabulary Knights

Each team currently has a team playing in the Open Division competition.

All the teams (Sharks, Angels, Warriors, Knights and Vultures) are based within the nation's capital of Kingston. There are many players who are from adjoining parishes such as St Catherine and St Andrew. For further information visit Jamaica Rugby League Association

=== Results History ===
- 2005 Grand Final - Vauxhall Vultures defeated the Duhaney Park Sharks 32 - 20

== See also ==
- Other Rugby League Playing Nations
