= Rugby league in Chile =

- Country: Chile
- National team: Chile
- Nickname: Weichafes
- First played: 2016, Negrete, Bío Bío Province
- Clubs: 8 Amateur

National competitions
- Futbol a 13 Chile

Rugby league is a new sport in Chile. It has grown rapidly from nothing to eight teams in less than one year.

== History ==
Rugby league was first played by Chilean Australians as part of the Latin Heat Rugby League.
