= Rugby League Emerging Nations World Championship =

International sporting competition

In 1995 and 2000, the Rugby League International Federation held an Emerging Nations Tournament alongside the Rugby League World Cup. The competition was designed to allow teams who have failed to qualify for the World Cup proper a chance to play on the international stage. A third tournament took place in 2018. In July 2019, it was announced that England would host the fourth tournament in June/July 2021 as part of the 2021 Festival of World Cups. However, following the postponement of the main 2021 World Cup tournament, the Emerging Nations World Championship was among the events that were cancelled.

Year	Venue(s)	Winner	Ref
1995	England	Cook Islands	
2000	England	BARLA select	
2018	Australia	Malta (Cup); Poland (Trophy); Solomon Islands (Bowl)	

== See also ==
- List of international rugby league teams
- Rugby League World Cup
