= Rugby league in Tokelau =

- Country: Tokelau
- National team: Tokelau

Rugby league is played in Tokelau and by Tokelaun ex-pats in New Zealand. A domestic competition has been established and a representative team has begun to play internationals against other Pacific teams.

The future of Tokelau as a league nation is limited by its small population although like the comparable Cook Islands, a large community of people with Tokelau heritage live in New Zealand.

In 1986 the Tokelau national team participated in the South Pacific Rugby League in the Cook Islands and in 2006 was a late entrant into the Pacific Cup competition.

== See also ==
- Rugby union in Tokelau
