= 2000 Rugby League Emerging Nations Tournament =

2000 Emerging Nations World Championship
- Number of teams: 6
- Host country: England
- Winner: (United Kingdom) BARLA (1st title)
- Matches played: 9
- Attendance: 8,880 (987 per match)

The 2000 Emerging Nations World Championship was the second edition of the tournament and was held alongside the 2000 Rugby League World Cup. The tournament was won by the British Amateur Rugby League Association (BARLA). The other five teams involved in the competition had all taken part in the World Cup qualification tournament the previous year.

== Venues ==
The games were played at various venues in England. The Final was played at Tetley's Stadium in Dewsbury.

Dewsbury	Halifax	Hull	Featherstone
Crown Flatt	The Shay	Craven Park	Post Office Road
Capacity: 5,100	Capacity: 14,061	Capacity: 12,225	Capacity: 9,850
Keighley	Whitehaven	Oxford	Wigan
Cougar Park	Recreation Ground	Court Place Farm	Robin Park Arena
Capacity: 7,800	Capacity: 7,500	Capacity: 4,000	Capacity: 2,000

== Group stage ==
=== Group A ===
Team	Played	Won	Drew	Lost	For	Against	Diff	Points
(United Kingdom) BARLA	2	2	0	0	114	2	+112	4
Morocco	2	1	0	1	14	68	−54	2
Japan	2	0	0	2	8	66	−58	0

13 November 2000
19:30 GMT (UTC±00:00)

BARLA (United Kingdom)	60–2	Morocco
	Summary

Lionheart Stadium, Featherstone
Attendance: 769
Referee: Karl Fitzpatrick (England)

15 November 2000
19:30 GMT (UTC±00:00)

Japan	8–12	Morocco
	Summary

Craven Park, Hull
Attendance: 1,488
Referee: Richard Silverwood (England)

17 November 2000
19:30 GMT (UTC±00:00)

BARLA (United Kingdom)	54–0	Japan
	Summary

Recreation Ground, Whitehaven
Attendance: 1,007
Referee: Steve Nicholson (England)

=== Group B ===
Team	Played	Won	Drew	Lost	For	Against	Diff	Points
Italy	2	2	0	0	106	22	+84	4
United States	2	1	0	1	68	50	+18	2
Canada	2	0	0	2	16	118	−102	0

13 November 2000
19:30 GMT (UTC±00:00)

United States	52–10	Canada
	Summary

Court Place Farm, Oxford
Attendance: 500
Referee: Nick Oddy (England)

15 November 2000
19:30 GMT (UTC±00:00)

Canada	6–66	Italy
	Summary

Cougar Park, Keighley
Attendance: 1,028
Referee: Robert Connolly (England)

17 November 2000
19:30 GMT (UTC±00:00)

Italy	40–16	United States
	Summary

The Shay, Halifax
Attendance: 1,487
Referee: Steve Presley (England)

== Knockout stage ==
Fifth place play-off

20 November 2000
13:00 GMT (UTC±00:00)

Canada	28–12	Japan
	Summary

Robin Park Arena, Wigan
Attendance: 500
Referee: Ian Smith (England)

Third place play-off

20 November 2000
15:00 GMT (UTC±00:00)

United States	50–10	Morocco
	Summary

Robin Park Arena, Wigan
Attendance: 500
Referee: Graham Shaw (England)

Final

20 November 2000
17:30 GMT (UTC±00:00)

BARLA (United Kingdom)	20–14	Italy
	Summary

Tetley's Stadium, Dewsbury
Attendance: 1,601
Referee: Robert Connolly (England)

== See also ==
- 1995 Rugby League Emerging Nations Tournament
