= Mexico national rugby league team =

Mexico
Team information
- Governing body: Mexico Rugby League

Uniforms
First colours

Team results
- World Cup
- Appearances: 0

The Mexico national rugby league team represents Mexico in the sport of rugby league. The team is operated by the Mexico Rugby League and sanctioned by the Rugby League International Federation to represent Mexico at international level in the sport of rugby league.

== History ==
Rugby league was introduced to Mexico in 2014 when the Mexico Rugby League organization was formed and organized the first domestic competition, involving three teams from the Mexico City and Guadalajara regions. Mexico Rugby League continued to host domestic competitions at both 13-a-side and 9-a-side in 2015 and 2016 as well as regional representative matches.

In November 2017, Mexico was scheduled to make its international debut in the inaugural Latin American Rugby League Championship, hosted in Los Ángeles, Chile. However the Mexican team did not ultimately participate in the tournament and was replaced by Brazil.
