= Burundi national rugby league team =

Team results
- First game
- Burundi 4-4 DR Congo
- First international
- Burundi 4-4 DR Congo

The Burundi national rugby league team are a rugby league team representing Burundi at the international level. Their first international was a 4-4 draw against DR Congo in April 2018. The match was not sanctioned by the Rugby League European Federation.
