= Turkish Rugby League Association =

- Founded: 2016
- Headquarters: Istanbul, Turkey
- Website: https://turkishrugbyleague.com/

The Turkish Rugby League Association (TRLA) is a sports league in Turkey. They play rugby league. There are 9 teams; five teams are from Istanbul and four external, including Izmir, Ankara, Edirne and Antalya. New local competitions involving different forms of the game are developing, including the Izmir Rugby League which has five local teams which play Rugby League adapted for smaller fields.

The TRLA is very popular in the cities of Istanbul and Eskisehir in Turkey, and is the biggest rugby league competition in Turkey. The first grand final took place on 25 March 2017. Though the organisation officially launched in 2016, preparation began the previous year, as rules were translated into Turkish that October. In September 2017, Turkey's official rugby union organisation, the Turkish Rugby Federation, said that they would ban any prospective rugby league players, following a similar move in the UAE.

In June 2026, the association had its membership status of International Rugby League reclassified from Affiliate Member to Observer Member.

== Teams ==
The following teams are members of the TRLA:

Istanbul teams

- Bilgi Badgers
- Bosphorus Wolves
- Kadikoy Bulls
- İstanbul Dragons

Teams external to Istanbul

- İzmir Zaferi
- Antalya Warriors
- Ankara Phyrgians
- Eskişehir Aqua Warriors
- Trakya Gladiators

== See also ==
- Turkey national rugby league team
