= DR Congo national rugby league team =

Rugby league team that represents DR Congo

DR Congo

Team information
- Governing body: DR Congo Rugby League XIII
- Region: Middle East-Africa

Team results
- First game
- DR Congo 4–4 Burundi (29 April 2018)
- First international
- DR Congo 4–4 Burundi (29 April 2018)

The DR Congo national rugby league team are a rugby league team that represents DR Congo at international level. Their first international was a 4–4 draw against Burundi in April 2018. The match was not sanctioned by the Rugby League European Federation.
