= Rugby league in Bosnia and Herzegovina =

Rugby league is played in Bosnia and Herzegovina, which now has over 1000 registered players nationwide, many of which are juniors. These numbers are rapidly increasing each year.

== History ==
In 2012, following the formation of the first club in Republika Srpska, one of the two entities in Bosnia and Herzegovina, a second club was formed in the city of Novi Grad, named New Thunder RLFC. Three coaches from the area took part in the Serbian Rugby League Federation Level 1 course in the middle of August, with them then overseeing the first ever domestic rugby league game in the Republic of Srpska and Bosnia and Herzegovina at Novi Grad Mlakve stadium, home of FC Sloboda Novi Grad. Dimitris Dajc refereed the game watched by around 300 curious locals, between New Thunder and the splendidly named White Rabbits, with the home team winning 28-20 in a very competitive game despite the visitors greater experience. Jovan Vujosevic, RLEF Central and East Europe director, shared his delight with the progress that was being made. "This is huge step for rugby league in Europe", he said. "We put a new country on the European rugby league map. The next objective is the formation of a third club in Bosnia and Herzegovina and a Rugby League Federation of the Republic of Srpska, followed by the formation of the Bosnia and Herzegovina Rugby League Federation as a final step."Serbia will help a lot in the development of the game in this area and we also hope that after Serbia, Bosnia and Herzegovina and Greece, other Balkan countries will follow suit."

In 2013, Bosnia held its first ever domestic competition with three clubs from Bosnia playing in a 6-round competition. In the first game, RLC Bjeli Zecevi beat Stanari’s RLC Rudar 36-4 at the City Stadium in Doboj. New Thunder RLFC finished third in the inaugural competition.

In October 2014, Bosnia and Herzegovina's rugby league status was more recognised after hosting an Under-16s International 9s tournament. Jovan Vujosevic said: “This was a huge step for rugby league in Bosnia Herzegovina...It was really well organized and all the teams were very happy. Club Vitez president Zeljko Ljubanic did a fantastic job.”

Main clubs are: Vitez Rugby League Club from Vitez, and "Warriors" Rugby League Club from Banja Luka.

In July 2015 a Great Britain Pioneers side came to tour Bosnia for 10 days. They would take on a Bosnia RL XIII team twice and would also take part in a 9s tournament. Jovan Vujosevic commented “This is a big step in the development of the game in Bosnia and Herzegovina, not least because the tour can open doors for recognition of the sport. This will be the first-ever British tour to Bosnia in either code of rugby and we are very proud of that." He also believed this tour could help develop other Balkan nations like Croatia, Montenegro, Macedonia, Albania and Bulgaria to join Serbia, Greece and Bosnia and Herzegovina in rugby league football.

On RLEF Congress on 11.08.2018. in Belgrade, Bosnia and Herzegovina is awarded right to host 2019 Balkans Cup in Vitez.

== The National Team ==
The National Team's first ever match came against Greece in an inaugural tournament known as the Balkans Cup held by fellow former Yugoslav neighbours Serbia. They played a total of two matches, but their matches weren't rated as official international matches as the national association were yet to apply for RLEF membership.
