= Pakistan national rugby league team =

Pakistan
Team information
- Region: Middle East
- Captain: Kashif Khwaja

Team results
- First international
- Pakistan 0–46 GB Community Lions; England; 18 July 2009)
- Biggest defeat
- Pakistan 0–62 BARLA Lions; Dubai, UAE; 30 November 2011)

The Pakistan national rugby league team was founded in 2008 to represent Pakistan in rugby league football after receiving support from the British Asian Rugby Association. In 2009 the team was granted official observer status by the Rugby League International Federation.

Pakistan played their first match as a national team against the BARLA Lions in Dubai, United Arab Emirates. They went down 62-0.
