= Rugby league in Malta =

Logo of the Maltese Rugby League Association

Rugby league is an emerging full-contact team sport in Malta. The first game played at Marsa in 2005 by a largely Australian-Maltese touring team from the East-coast of Australia. The Maltese team opened with a successful 36–6 victory over England Lionhearts and featured one local Maltese player, Robert Bonavia.

== History ==
The Maltese Rugby League Association (MRLA) was formed in April 2004 at the Russian Club in Strathfield, Australia.

Malta made their international debut on 25 September 2004 when they defeated British Defence Forces at Melita Stadium, Sydney, Australia.

- Score: Malta won 78-0
- Crowd: 120

Malta's first rugby league international played on home soil was on Saturday October 2005 against England Lionhearts at Marsa Sports Complex, Marsa.

- Score: Malta won 36-6
- Crowd: 500

The first domestic rugby league match in Malta was on Saturday 13 October 2007 between San Giljan Dragons and Birkirkara Warriors at Floriana Stadium. (Match played in nines format).

- Score: Draw 10-10
- Crowd: about 100

== Governing body ==
The Malta Rugby League (MRL) is the official governing body of rugby league in Malta. The MRL is an Affiliate Member of the Rugby League European Federation (RLEF) and recognised by the Rugby League International Federation (RLIF). The MRL is also a member of the Kunsill Malti ghall-iSport (KMS) - the national organisation responsible for supporting, developing and promoting sport throughout Malta and Gozo.

The organisation was formed in 2008 following the merger of the now defunct Maltese Rugby League Association (formed 2004 in Australia) and the local Kumitat Nazzjonali ta Rugby League f’Malta (2006), in a move that was designed to homogenise Maltese rugby league’s structure and further its European dimension.

Full European integration occurred in 2011 when the remaining Australian-based Directors resigned, paving the way for locals to take their place. A nine-person Board oversees MRL policy, with an operations manager from each club responsible for the day-to-day running of the sport.

== Competitions ==
In October 2007 the first domestic rugby league competition, the Malta Rugby League Nines, was contested with fixtures at Floriana Stadium, Floriana. Participating teams were the San Giljan Dragons, Mosta Titans, Sliema Broncos, Qormi Sharks, Birkirkara Warriors and the Siggiewi Storm along with the British Royal Logistics Corps. A Malta selection were crowned champions after defeating the Royal Logistics Corps in the final.

Between 2009 and 2010, the MRL Championship took place with only four games played between "North" and "South". There is also a Wheelchair rugby league championship and an MRL Academy.

== Popularity ==
The match against England Lionhearts was partly the catalyst for continued rugby league development on the Maltese Islands and has helped set up a domestic competition within Malta.

A crowd of approximately 750 were in attendance for the first rugby league match in Malta played at Matthew Micallef St John Athletic Stadium, Marsa.

The MRL's Australian links lie in the form of Maltese Heritage Rugby League that enables the foundation to promote the legacy across Australia, promoting and developing rugby league within the Maltese community. Maltese Heritage RL has teams catering for 12-year-olds through to seniors, via Academy, U16s, U18s and the Open Age Maltese Heritage RL team.

== The national team ==
The Malta national rugby league team is made up of local rugby league players from Malta and Heritage players from England and Australia. The team is nicknamed the Knights.

Malta XIII is a national representative team for the Republic of Malta. Players must satisfy international eligibility criteria or be a resident of Malta or Gozo. Eligible players of Malta XIII can be selected for Malta Knights.

== See also ==
- Rugby union in Malta
