= Rugby League World Cup hosts =

Seven countries have hosted and/or co-hosted the Rugby League World Cup. England, France, Australia and New Zealand have hosted the World Cup on multiple occasions and the tournament has never been played outside its traditional 'heartlands' in these areas. The International Rugby League is responsible for picking hosts.

From 1954 to 1960 the Men's Rugby League World Cup was held triennially, however from 1960 to 2008 (Note: The birth of the modern World Cup in 1995 was intended to begin a regular triennial competition. However with the Super League war and the financial disaster of the 2000 Rugby League World Cup, this would not materialise until 2008 and saw a change to a quadrennial tournament.) World Cups were sporadic. In this time period hosts were picked and tournaments were arranged between the four traditional rugby league playing countries and the IRL. From 2013 World Cups were held quadrennially and countries have to send an application and bids to the IRL to host the World Cup as more teams participate in international rugby league.

The Women's Rugby League World Cup was first held in 2000 alongside the men's version and eight years later the Wheelchair Rugby League World Cup was inaugurated. Both these tournament began as part of the Festival of World Cups, a collection of smaller competitions played as a build up to the opening of the men's tournament. For the 2017 World Cup, the women's tournament received equal status and was played alongside the men's tournament, with the Wheelchair World Cup following in 2021.

== List of Rugby League World Cup hosts ==
=== Men's ===
Year	Host(s)	Confederation
1954	France	Europe
1957	Australia	Asia-Pacific
1960	United Kingdom	Europe
1968	Australia; New Zealand	Asia-Pacific
1970	United Kingdom	Europe
1972	France	Europe
1975	Australia; France; New Zealand; United Kingdom	Europe and Asia-Pacific
1977	Australia; New Zealand	Asia-Pacific
1985–1988	No host; home and away format	
1989–1992	No host; home and away format	
1995	England; Wales	Europe
2000	England; France; Ireland; Scotland; Wales	Europe
2008	Australia	Asia-Pacific
2013	England; Wales	Europe
2017	Australia; New Zealand; Papua New Guinea	Asia-Pacific
2021	England	Europe
2026	Australia; Papua New Guinea	Asia-Pacific
2030	United States	Americas

NB: As Great Britain was the IRL nation until 1995, the United Kingdom is used to refer to host nations before this time regardless of the number of home nations which actually hosted the tournament.

=== Women's ===
Year	Host(s)	Confederation
2000	United Kingdom	Europe
2003	New Zealand	Asia-Pacific
2008	Australia	Asia-Pacific
2013	England	Europe
2017	Australia	Asia-Pacific
2021	England	Europe
2026	Australia; Papua New Guinea	Asia-Pacific
2030	United States	Americas

NB: As Great Britain was the IRL nation until 2003, the United Kingdom is used to refer to host nations before this time regardless of the number of home nations which actually hosted the tournament.

=== Wheelchair ===
Year	Host(s)	Confederation
2008	Australia	Asia-Pacific
2013	England	Europe
2017	France	Europe
2021	England	Europe
2026	Australia	Asia-Pacific
2030	France	Europe

== Bids ==
=== 2013 ===
Bids:

- Australia
- England / Wales

Australia bid for the 2013 World Cup following their success of hosting the 2008 World Cup. The Rugby Football League (RFL) also submitted a bid for England and Wales to host the World Cup for the first time since 2000. The RFL bid was later accepted.

Winners: England / Wales

=== 2017 ===
Bids:

- Australia / New Zealand / Papua New Guinea
- South Africa

South Africa bid to host the 2017 World Cup hoping to be the first African nation to host a rugby league World Cup believing that they help grow the game internationally. Australia also bid for the hosting rights again but with the help of New Zealand to co host. The RLIF accepted Australia and New Zealand's bid to host the 2017 World Cup as there would be more chance of the tournament being a success although South Africa was praised for their growing domestic game.

Winners: Australia / New Zealand / Papua New Guinea

NB: The wheelchair tournament was held in France

=== 2021 (Held in 2022) ===
Bids:

- England
- United States / Canada

Withdrawn bids

- United Arab Emirates

On 15 April 2015, the UAE expressed interest in biding for the World Cup with a formal bid being later materialised. The UAERL believed the country has the facilities, as well as the financial backing and infrastructure to host the World Cup. The bid was later cancelled after rugby union officials in the UAE had the leader of the bid arrested for "managing a sporting body which is not registered and therefore not recognised by the relevant government authority".

On 25 November 2015 England's RFL announced it had government backed plans to host the 2021 World Cup after the success of 2013. The RFL put in an official bid for the 2021 World Cup on 30 June 2016 with £15m funding from the government and the aim to have over 1 million spectators. The USARL put a bid in with the hope to grow the sport throughout North America.

Winners: England

=== 2025 moved to 2026 ===
Bids

- Australia (later included Papua New Guinea as co-host)
- New Zealand (solo)

Expressed interest in biding

- Fiji (as co-host only)
- South Africa
- Qatar
- New Zealand ("Pasifika" bid (Note: The "Pasifika" bid was set to include a number of Pacific Island countries as co-host))

Withdrawn following successful bid

- United States / Canada
- France

The 2025 World Cup was recommended by the IRL to be hosted in the USA and Canada with their bid later being awarded. However due to the organisers Moore Sports encountering financial difficulties they were stripped of the hosting.

The IRL then went on the recommend France who in July 2021 officially bid to host the World Cup and again won the right to host the tournament. However in May 2023, France withdrew due to financial concerns from the new French government elected that month.

Following France's withdrawal, Fiji, New Zealand, Qatar, and South Africa expressed interest in bidding. In August 2023, the IRL confirmed that a Southern Hemisphere nation(s) would host the tournament in 2026.

Following public interest surrounding the Qatar bid, the IRL confirmed it was not an official bid and also confirmed that the IRL did not see Qatar as a feasible option for hosting an international tournament at present, but would be open to them hosting in the future. They also confirmed interest from other Middle Eastern nations.

On 24 July 2024, the IRL announced that Australia would host the 2026 tournament, with a number of games played in Papua New Guinea.

Winners: United States / Canada (later withdrew), France (later withdrew), Australia / Papua New Guinea

=== 2030 ===
On 3 August 2023, the IRL announced the men's tournament would continue on a four-year cycle with the next edition taking place in 2026 (four years after the postponed 2021 tournament) and held concurrently with the women's and wheelchair tournaments. The following men's event would take place in 2030 with the next women's tournament taking place as a stand-alone event in 2028 before continuing on a four-year cycle. The decision was made to ease the strain on future host nations, and as recognition of the growth of the women's competition. The same decision was made on 13 November for the wheelchair tournament for the same reasons, with their new four-year cycle starting in 2029.

On 19 December 2025, the IRL reversed this decision, and announced that the next women's, and wheelchair world cups would be held concurrently with the men's tournament in 2030. This decision was made to preserve the uniqueness of the tournament, with the sport being one of only a few which hold all disciplines of their world cup at the same time.

Between the two announcements, a number of nations had bid to host solely the men's, women's and wheelchair world cups in 2030, 2028, and 2029 respectively:

==== Men's ====
Bids

- Kenya
- New Zealand
- Papua New Guinea
- South Africa
- United States

Expressed interest in biding:

- Seven nations

Following the end of the 2023 season it was confirmed seven nations had expressed interest in bidding for the World Cup. Deadline for bids was confirmed as 16 February 2024.

On 31st July 2024, the International Rugby League announced Kenya, New Zealand, Papua New Guinea, South Africa, and the United States had made a success first round bid and would be advancing those bids to the second round. When originally planned for 2029, it was known that New Zealand and South Africa had expressed interest to bid, and that International Rugby League had targeted the United States to host but later favoured them for 2033 (now 2034) instead.

In August 2024, South Africa estimated that hosting the event would result in a R4 billion boost to the country's economy. In September, South Africa submitted a proposal to host the 2025 Men's and Women's World Series, in attempt to strengthen their bids to host the 2028 and 2030 World Cups. Their World Series bids were deemed not viable by the IRL.

In November 2025, Fox League reported that the United States were frontrunners to host the 2030 World Cup, with the IRL keen to capitalise on the commercial growth of the sport following National Rugby League's Rugby League Las Vegas event which had started the previous year.

==== Women's ====
Bids

- France
- Kenya
- New Zealand
- Papua New Guinea

Withdrawn bids

- South Africa

Expressed interest in biding:

- Eight nations

Following the end of the 2023 season it was confirmed eight nations had expressed interest in bidding for the World Cup. Deadline for bids was confirmed as 16 February 2024.

On 29th July 2024, the International Rugby League announced France, Kenya, New Zealand, Papua New Guinea, and South Africa had made a success first round bid and would be advancing those bids to the second round.

In September 2024, South Africa submitted a proposal to host the 2025 Men's and Women's World Series, in attempt to strengthen their bids to host the 2028 and 2030 World Cups. Their World Series bids were deemed not viable by the IRL. South Africa later withdrew their bid for the 2028 Women's World Cup to focus on their bid for the 2030 Men's World Cup.

==== Wheelchair ====
Bids

- England
- France
- United States

Expressed interest in biding:

- Five nations

Following the end of the 2023 season it was confirmed five nations had expressed interest in bidding for the World Cup. Deadline for bids was confirmed as 16 February 2024.

On 30th July 2024, the International Rugby League announced England, France, and the United States had made a success first round bid and would be advancing those bids to the second round.

==== Events following reamalgamatiion ====
On 9th November 2026, the IRL announced the 2030 Rugby League World Cup would be held across the "United States and the Pacific" for the men's and women's tournament while being organised by the Australian Rugby League Commission, with France hosting a separate wheelchair tournament. The United States was chosen based on being a potential growth market with 80% of Premier Sports subscription for the 2026 Rugby League World Cup being from the United States and the success of the Rugby League Las Vegas venture as reasons being cited.

Winners: United States (men's and women's) / France (wheelchair)

=== 2034 ===
In November 2034, the IRL announced they were targeting a return to Europe for the 2034 Rugby League World Cup.

== Total bids by country ==
Key

- C = Combined bids (men's, women's, and wheelchair)
- M = Men's bids
- W = Women's bids
- WC = Wheelchair bids
- **bolded** = Successful bids
- ~~crossed out~~ = Withdrawn bids
- NB: Rejected bids and expressions of interest are not included

Country	Bids	Years	Times hosted (Note: Including pre-bidding era)
New Zealand	4	**2017 C**, 2026 C, 2028 W, 2030 M	4
United States	4	2021 C, ~~**2025 C**~~, 2029 WC, **2030 M** (Note: Along with the corresponding women's tournament)	0
Australia	3	2013 C, **2017 C**, **2026 C**	7
England	3	**2013 C**, **2021 C**, 2029 WC	7 (Note: Including three times English venues hosted during time as Great Britain)
France	3	~~**2025 C**~~, 2028 W, **2029 WC** (Note: To be played in 2030)	4
South Africa	3	2017 C, ~~2028 W~~, 2030 M	0
Papua New Guinea	3	**2017 C**, 2028 W, 2030 M	1 (Note: Papua New Guinea co-hosted the 2026 World Cup but was not listed as an official host)
Canada	2	2021 C, ~~**2025 C**~~	0
Kenya	2	2028 W, 2030 M	0
United Arab Emirates	1	~~2021 C~~	0
Wales	1	**2013 C**	3 (Note: Including one time Welsh venues hosted during time as Great Britain)

== See also ==
- Rugby World Cup hosts
