= History of the Rugby League World Cup =

Sports competition history

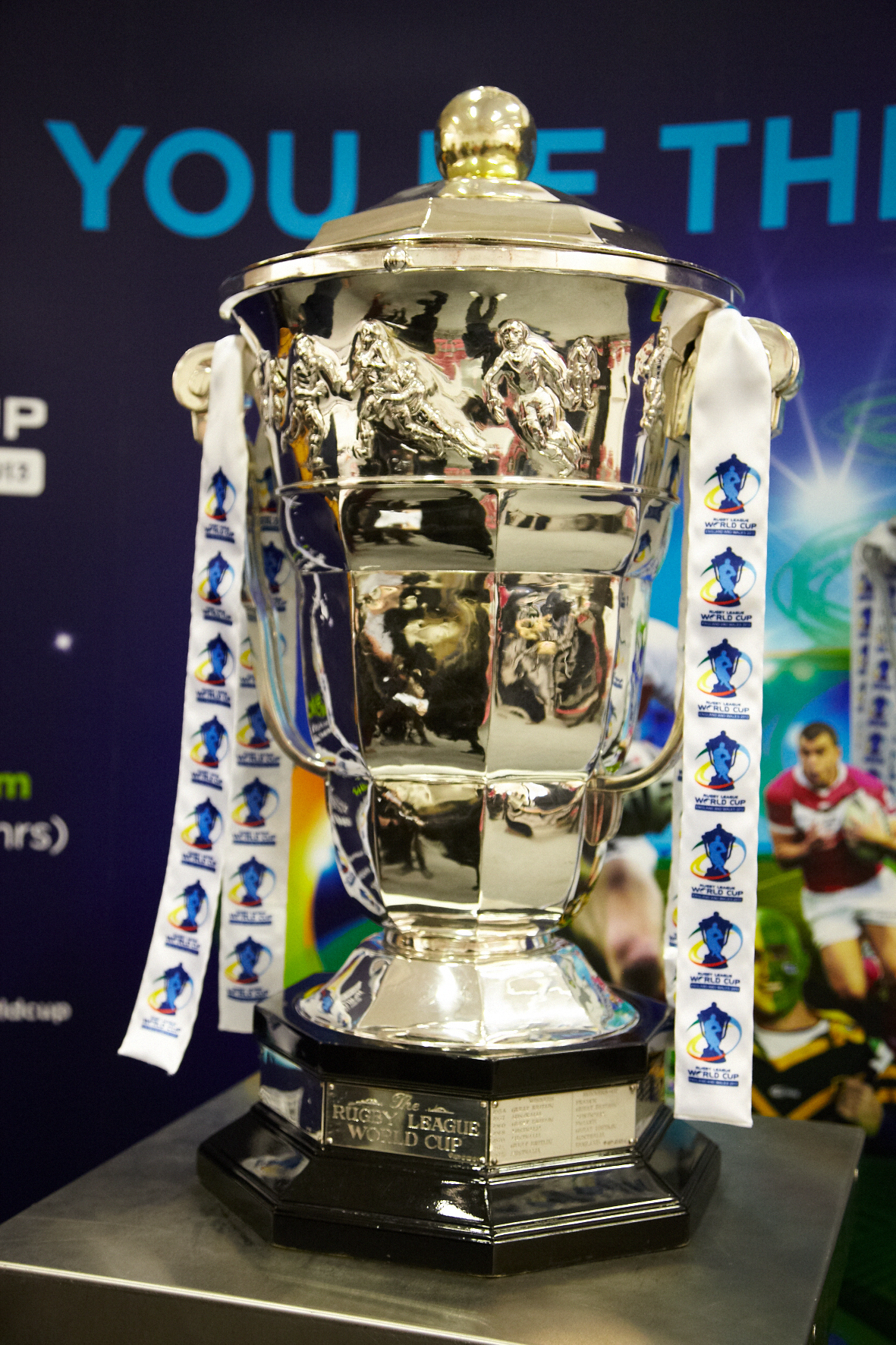
The Paul Barrière Trophy of the Rugby League World Cup

The Rugby League World Cup is an international rugby league tournament currently played every four years. The first tournament was held in 1954, hosted by France who had pushed for such a tournament to be approved. There have been 17 editions held at sporadic intervals.

== Pre–1954: Establishment ==
Since 1935, the French had been campaigning this initiative of an international tournament like the World Cup. Previously, nations had done tours of other test playing nations, however there wasn't one particular unifying tournament between rugby league's best nations. Eventually, in 1951, Paul Barrière, the president of French Rugby League at the time, raised the idea of the World Cup. A year later, Rugby Football League secretary Bill Fallowfield persuaded the Rugby League Council to back the idea. The following year, at a meeting in Blackpool, the International Board accepted Barrière's proposal of the World Cup.

== 1954–1960: Early tournaments ==
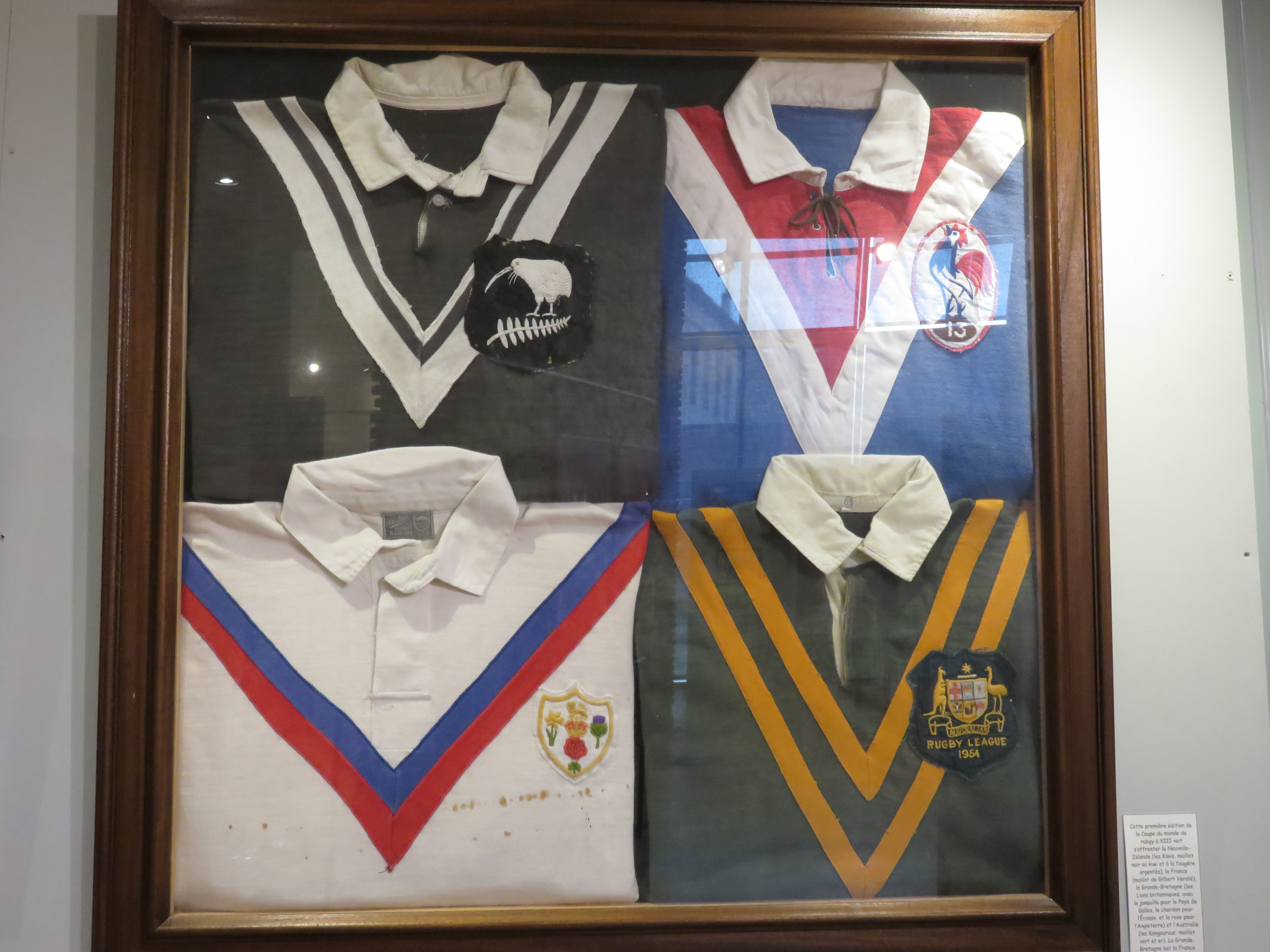
The jerseys of the original four teams: (in clockwise from top left) New Zealand, France, Australia and Great Britain

In 1954, the first tournament was conducted in Barrière's home nation, with Great Britain, Australia and New Zealand, Francs rounding out the four team tournament. In the final, Great Britain downed France 16–12 at the Parc des Princes in Paris in front of 30,368 fans on 13 November. France then donated the trophy (now known as the Paul Barrière Trophy) to the International Board. The cup, at the time, was worth eight million francs and is still in use today.

In the next tournament three years later, it was decided that the four nations from the first tournament would play each other again in a round-robin format, however with no final, the team which finished on top would be the victors. Australia went on to win the 1957 tournament on home soil. The tournament returned again three years later, with Great Britain taking the tournament out at home. That tournament was widely regarded as a great success.

== 1960–1977: Sporadic competitions ==
It was not until eight years later when the tournament would return. There were plans, announced at a 1962 International Board meeting by Bill Fallowfield, for a 1965 tournament which would return to France and feature South Africa for the first time. These plans were later scrapped after a poor tour of Australia by the planned hosts France. In 1968, the competition returned with Australia beating France in the first final since the inaugural competition 20–2 at the Sydney Cricket Ground in front of 54,290 people. That tournament also featured Australia's highest crowd for a World Cup match, with 62,256 people in attendance at the SCG for their pool match against Great Britain. The hosts won that match 25–10. The tournament was then held every two years, with Australia becoming the first nation to retain their title, doing so over in England in 1970 and Great Britain winning their third and last competition in France in 1972. They won this tournament, despite tying with Australia 10–all in the final, because of their superior group stage record.

In 1975, was hosted across two federations. Great Britain split into England and Wales for the 1975 tournament as Wales wanted to showcase the high level of talent they had (no Scottish or Irish players made the original squad), this created a five team tournament for the first time. A final was not planned for that tournament, with the winner meant to have come from the team who finished top. However, despite finishing first, Australia hadn't defeated England yet so they played a challenge match against the English at Headingley. This didn't prove to be an issue for the Australians however, as they won that match 25–0 in front of 7,680 people.

In 1977, Great Britain returned as a single, combined entity and the World Cup saw Australia and New Zealand hosting. The final was closely fought, with Australia coming out on top against Great Britain 13–12 at the Sydney Cricket Ground. However, due to the constant tinkering with the format of the tournament, the public was starting to lose interest, and it would be eight years until the tournament returned.

== 1985–1992: Decentralised tournament ==
The next tournament was held across four years, from 1985 to 1988, with the teams playing each other twice both at home and away. This tournament also saw the debut of Papua New Guinea, who triumphantly beat New Zealand 24–22 at the PNG Football Stadium (then called Lloyd Robson Oval) in Port Moresby. This tournament culminated with Australia defeating New Zealand 25–12 in the final at Auckland's Eden Park in front of 47,363 people, the largest rugby league crowd New Zealand has ever seen. The format remained for the following edition, which ran between 1989 and 1992. This tournament was won again by Australia, who defeated Great Britain 10–6 in the final at the Wembley Stadium in front of 73,361, a record crowd for the tournament not broken until the 2013 final at Old Trafford. That tournament would also be the last to feature Great Britain, with England and Wales taking their place.

== 1995–2000: Expansion ==
For the 1995 World Cup, various changes were made to the format and running of the tournament. The tournament returned to having a centralised host, with England and Wales jointly hosting the tournament. The tournament also expanded to ten teams, with Fiji, Samoa, South Africa and Tonga making their tournament debuts. Also, due to the Super League war, the Australian team was weakened as players contracted to the Super League clubs were unable to be selected for the Kangaroos. The teams were split into three groups, with Group A containing four teams whilst B and C contained three teams each. The top two teams of Group A, alongside the winners of Groups B and C, formed the semi-final stage. Here, England beat Wales 25–10 while Australia beat New Zealand 30–20 after extra time. The final was won by Australia, 16–8 at the Wembley Stadium. This tournament also celebrated the 100th anniversary of rugby league and was a success, with crowds upwards of 250,000 people attending the group stages and 66,540 at the final match.

The 2000 World Cup then took place five years later in the British Isles and France. This time it held a further expanded field of sixteen teams, including the debuts of Cook Islands, Ireland, Lebanon, Russia, Scotland and Aotearoa Māori, who were a representative team made up of players of Māori descent. These teams were drawn into four groups of four teams each, where the top two teams in each group qualified for the knockout stage. The Final was played at Manchester's Old Trafford in front of 44,329 people. It was played between Australia and New Zealand, with Australia winning 40–12.

== 2008–present: Regular competition ==
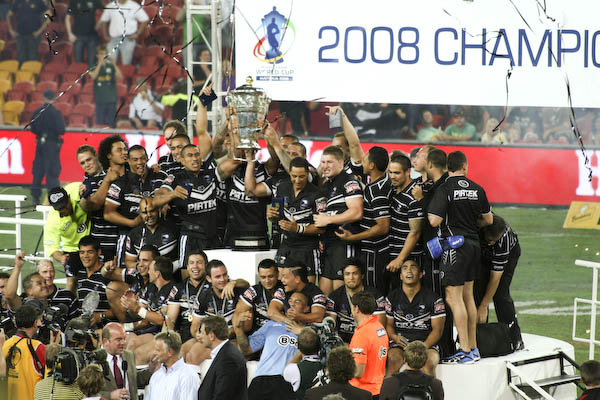
New Zealand lifting the Paul Barrière Trophy after winning the 2008 tournament

To mark the centenary of rugby league in Australia, the World Cup was brought back eight years later, and the 2008 World Cup occurred along the east coast of the nation. This tournament saw the number of teams cut to ten, with one super group of four and two smaller groups with three teams in each. Prior to the tournament, Australia beat New Zealand 58–0 in a warm-up match. However, this was not at all a foreshadowing of the tournament which was just about to occur. The opening ceremony took place on 26 October, with a match between the Indigenous Dreamtime and the New Zealand Māori representative teams acting as a curtain raiser for the tournament at the Sydney Football Stadium. The Dreamtime side won 34–26. Australia beat New Zealand in the official tournament opener 30–6 in front of 34,157 fans. After their massive loss before the tournament, the Kiwis went into the final destined for revenge, but an upset would be needed to stop the rampaging Australian side, who had defeated Fiji 52–0 in the semi-finals. To the shock of the rugby league world, the Kiwis won against the Kangaroos, 34–20, in one of the shock international rugby league results of all time. This would be the first World Cup win for the Kiwis, who had participated in every edition of the tournament. Controversy occurred after the match, with Australia coach Ricky Stuart verbally attacking Geoff Carr, the head of the ARL, alongside aggressively intimidating referee Ashley Klein and Stuart Cummings, the RFL director of match officials, at the hotel. This led to Stuart's resignation. Off the field, the tournament was a massive success, with an average attendance 91% higher than that of the tournament eight years prior. The final also sold out months in advance.

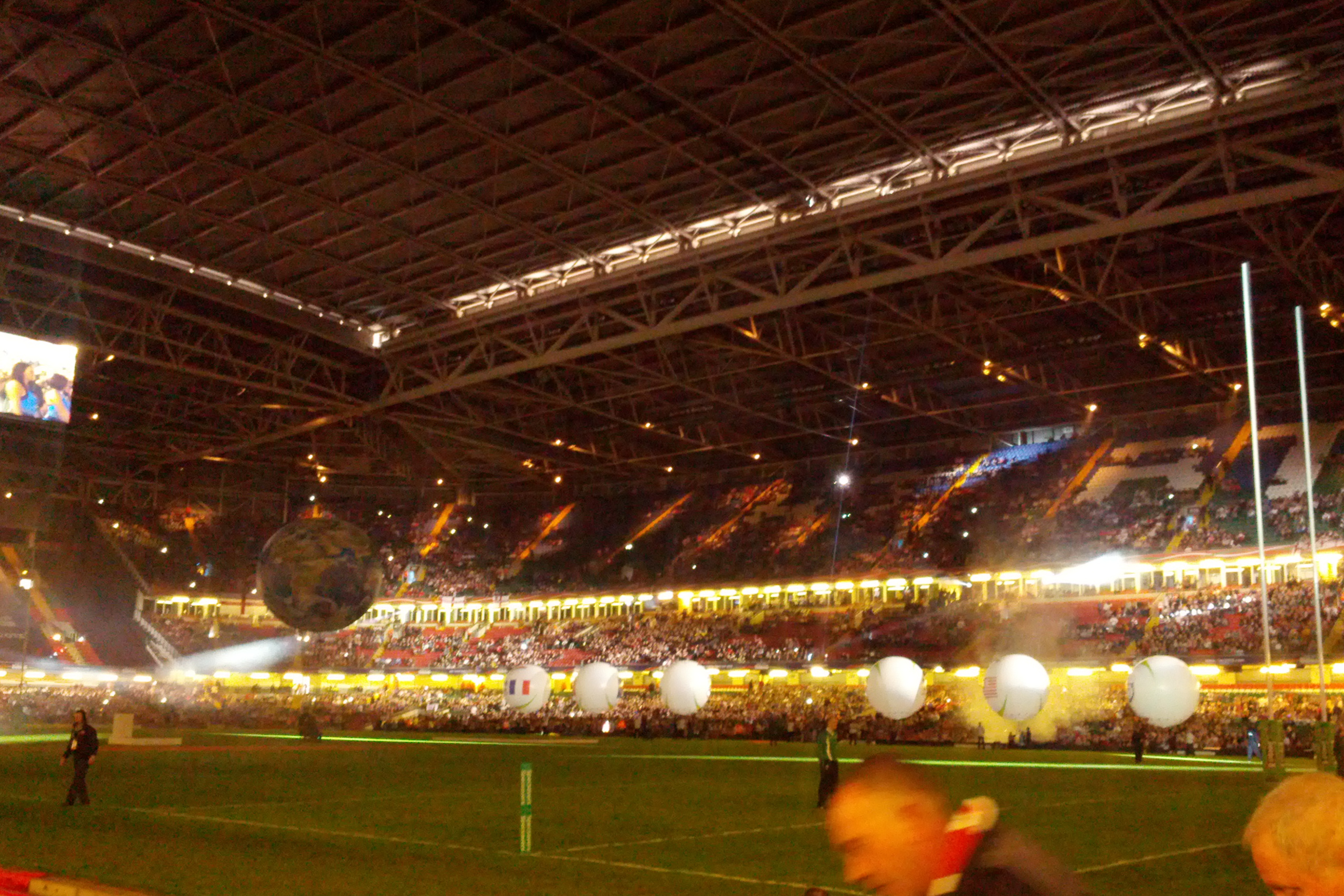
The opening ceremony of the 2013 World Cup at the Millennium Stadium in Cardiff

Originally scheduled for 2012, England and Wales, with games also in Ireland and France, hosted the 14-team 2013 World Cup, which was deemed a widespread success. The tournament was moved very early in its organisation to 2013 due to the United Kingdom hosting the 2012 Summer Olympics. The tournament opened with a double-header at Cardiff's Millennium Stadium, with debutants Italy beating Wales 32–16 before Australia defeated England 28–20 in front of 45,052 fans. This crowd was the largest opening day crowd and the largest rugby league crowd in Wales. The tournament also saw the largest rugby league crowd in Ireland, with 5,021 watching Ireland go down to Australia 50–0 at Limerick's Thomond Park. Another success story of the tournament was the United States making the quarter-finals on their tournament debut, before succumbing to Australia 62–0. The semi-finals were played at Wembley Stadium, with 67,545 people attending the double-header, with New Zealand defeating England 20–18 thanks to a last minute try by Shaun Johnson before Australia defeated Fiji 64–0 directly after. The final was then played at Old Trafford, where Australia won their tenth World Cup, defeating New Zealand 34–2 in front of 74,468 people, the largest international rugby league crowd of all time.

The 2017 World Cup took place in Australia, New Zealand and Papua New Guinea four years later. The tournament initially grew traction after high-profile stars Jason Taumalolo and Andrew Fifita led a wave of players pledging their international allegiance to Tonga, their nation of heritage, instead of New Zealand and Australia. Using the same format as the previous tournament, there were various upsets in the matches, with Lebanon defeating France, and both Tonga and Fiji defeating New Zealand, giving the Kiwis their worst result since the expansion of the tournament in some of rugby league's shock all-time results. Lebanon and Tonga both saw their best tournament performances, reaching the quarter-finals and semi finals respectively. The tournament also featured three sell-out matches at the PNG Football Stadium in Port Moresby involving the home nation and a full crowd of 30,003 at Auckland's Mount Smart Stadium, who witnessed the tense semi-final between England and Tonga. One particular controversy was that Sydney only hosted two low/mid-drawing matches both involving Lebanon. The tournament organisers however defended this "Sydney Cup snub". The final was again played at Brisbane's Lang Park, with 40,033 fans witnessing Australia defeat England 6–0 to claim their eleventh tournament.

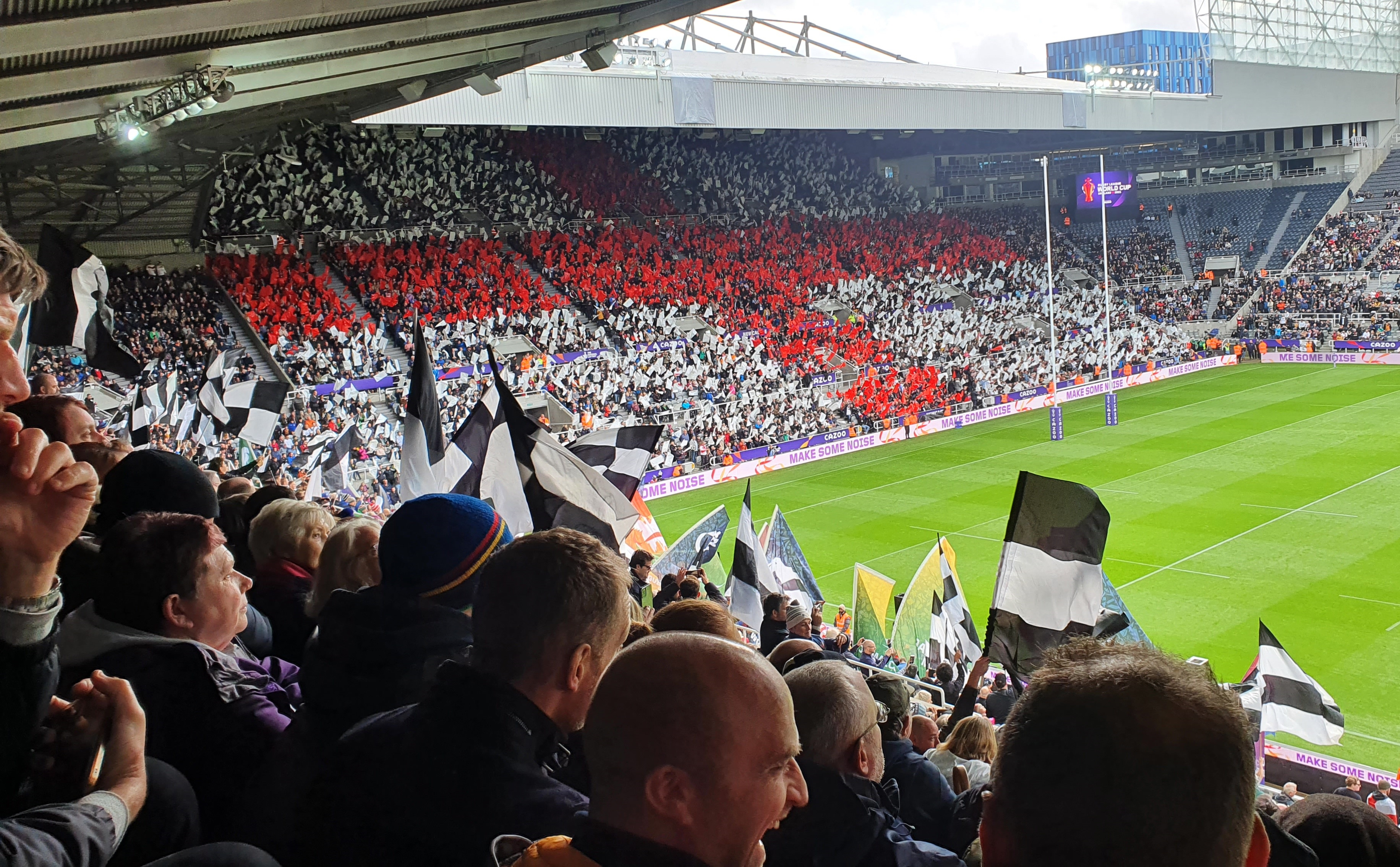
The opening match of the 2021 Men's Rugby League World Cup at St James' Park

England were chosen to host the 2021 tournament which was postponed to 2022 due to Australia and New Zealand withdrawing due to the COVID-19 pandemic. with organisers expressing a desire to see a total of one million fans attend games. This tournament saw the number of teams increased to 16 once again, with Greece and Jamaica debuting in the competition. In 2021, the women's and wheelchair competitions were given equal prominence with the men's tournament, as a result all three competition were run simultaneously for the first time. Australia again won the competition, beating final debutants Samoa 30–10. The 2021 tournament was the most watched rugby league world cup in history, and was regarded as a sporting, commercial, and social success by the IRL.

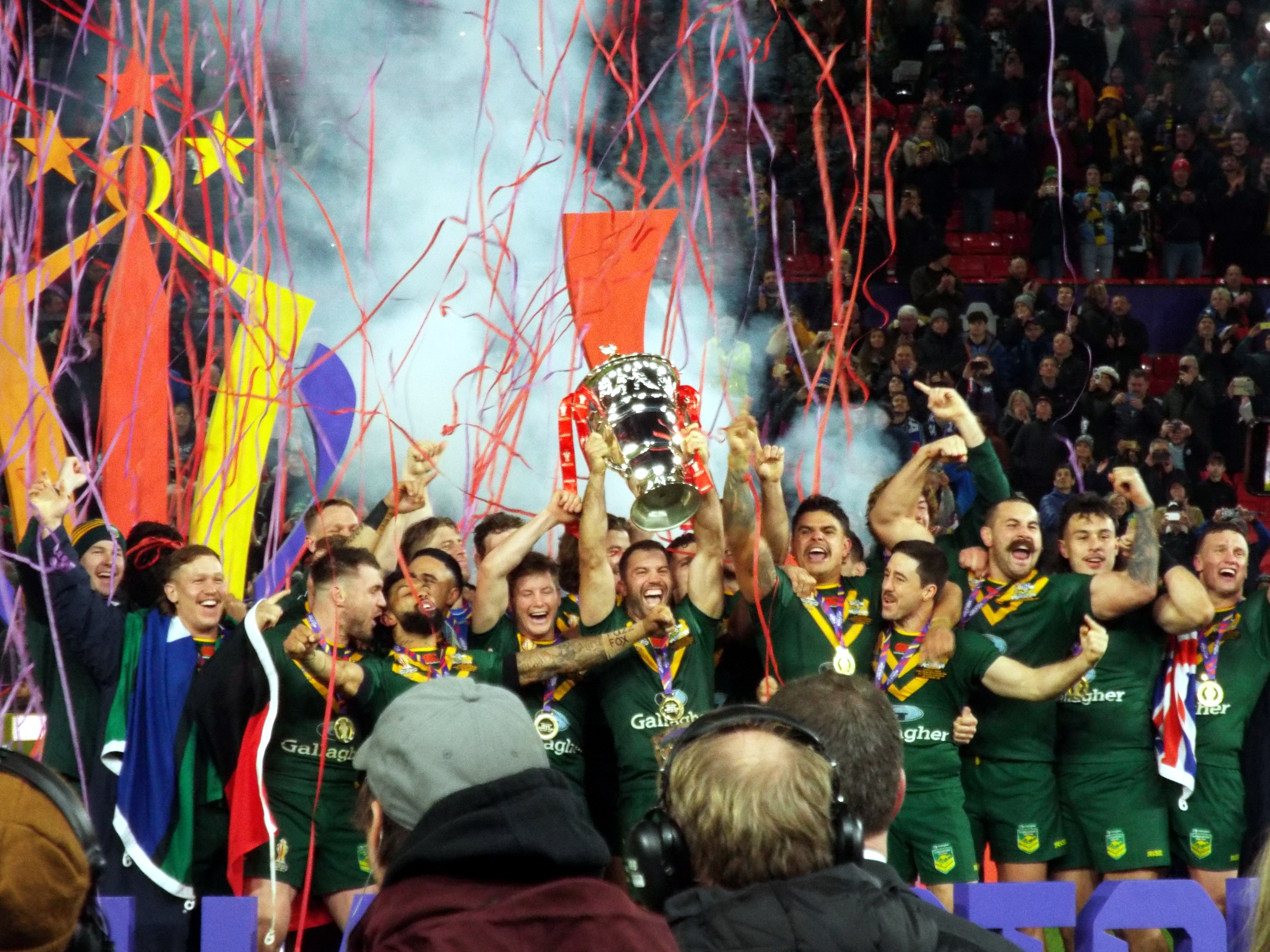
Australia lifting the Paul Barrière Trophy following the 2021 Men's Rugby League World Cup final

A proposal was put forward in 2016 to hold the 2025 Rugby League World Cup in the United States and Canada, but in December 2018 plans for the tournament to be held in North America were scrapped due to financial concerns.

On 11 January 2022, it was announced France would host the tournament in 2025, however on 15 May 2023 France pulled out of hosting the tournament after the French government withdrew financial support. A day later, New Zealand announced they were considering a bid, but would possibly require a delay to 2026.

On 3 August, the IRL announced that the tournament would be postponed to 2026 and held in the southern hemisphere with only 10 teams taking part.

With the announcement of the 2025 World Cup to 2026 came confirmation that the following competition would be held in 2030. In the announcement International Rugby League confirmed that the tournament would be held once again as a stand alone competition with the women's and wheelchair tournaments held separately.

== Evolution of the format ==
| Year | Host(s) | Teams | Matches | Group stages | Final stages |
|---|---|---|---|---|---|
Round Robin era
| 1954 | France | 4 | 7 | Single Round Robin | Top 2 teams play in final |
| 1957 | Australia | 4 | 6 | Single Round Robin | |
| 1960 | United Kingdom | 4 | 6 | Single Round Robin | |
| 1968 | Australia; New Zealand | 4 | 7 | Single Round Robin | Top 2 teams play in final |
| 1970 | United Kingdom | 4 | 7 | Single Round Robin | Top 2 teams play in final |
| 1972 | France | 4 | 7 | Single Round Robin | Top 2 teams play in final |
| 1975 | Australia; France; New Zealand; United Kingdom | 5 (Note: Great Britain split into England and Wales for a one-off tournament due to the influx of Welsh talent at the time. No Scottish or Irish player made the original Great Britain squad. Note: Following the tournament's 1995 restructure, Great Britain permanently split into England, Scotland, Wales, and Ireland.) | 21 | Double Round Robin (Note: Despite topping the table, Australia had not beaten England throughout the tournament. Therefore, to win the cup, a final challenge was hastily arranged.) | |
| 1977 | New Zealand; Australia | 4 | 7 | Single Round Robin | Top 2 teams play in final |
| 1985–88 | Home and away format | 5 | 18 (Note: France's 1987 away fixtures against Australia, New Zealand and Papua New Guinea were scratched and each team awarded two points as the French were unable to tour Australasia that year due to financial difficulties.) | Double Round Robin | Top 2 teams play in final |
| 1989–92 | Home and away format | 5 | 21 | Double Round Robin | Top 2 teams play in final |
Groups and Knockout era
| 1995 | England | 10 | 15 | 1 group of 4 teams, 2 groups of 3 teams | Knockout of 4 teams (Top two teams from Group A. Top team from Group B and Group C.) |
| 2000 | England; France; Ireland; Scotland; Wales | 16 | 31 | 4 groups of 4 teams | Knockout of 8 teams (Top two teams from each group.) |
| 2008 | Australia | 10 | 18 | 1 group of 4 teams, 2 groups of 3 teams | Knockout of 5 teams (Top three teams from Group A. Top team from Group B and Group C, with group B and C team contesting a playoff.) |
| 2013 | England; Wales; France; Ireland | 14 | 28 | 2 groups of 4 teams, 2 groups of 3 teams | Knockout of 8 teams (Top three teams from Group A and Group B. Top team from Group C and Group D) |
| 2017 | Australia; New Zealand; Papua New Guinea | 14 | 28 | 2 groups of 4 teams, 2 groups of 3 teams | Knockout of 8 teams (Top three teams from Group A and Group B. Top team from Group C and Group D) |
| 2021 | England | 16 | 31 | 4 groups of 4 teams | Knockout of 8 teams (Top two teams from each group.) |
| 2026 | Australia; New Zealand; Papua New Guinea | 10 | 18 | 1 group of 4 teams, 2 groups of 3 teams | Knockout of 4 teams (top two teams of group A, top two teams of combined groups B and C) |
| 2030 | United States | 12 | TBA | TBA | Knockout of 4 teams (TBA) |

== Winning teams, captains and managers ==
| Year | Host | Winning team | Captain | Coach |
|---|---|---|---|---|
| 1954 | France | Great Britain | Dave Valentine | G Shaw |
| 1957 | Australia | Australia | Dick Poole | Dick Poole |
| 1960 | United Kingdom | Great Britain | Eric Ashton | William Fallowfield |
| 1968 | Australia; New Zealand | Australia | Johnny Raper | Harry Bath |
| 1970 | United Kingdom | Australia | Ron Coote | Harry Bath |
| 1972 | France | Great Britain | Clive Sullivan | Jim Challinor |
| 1975 | Australia; France; New Zealand; United Kingdom | Australia | Arthur Beetson | Graeme Langlands |
| 1977 | New Zealand; Australia | Australia | Arthur Beetson | Terry Fearnley |
| 1985–88 | Various | Australia | Wally Lewis | Don Furner |
| 1989–92 | Various | Australia | Mal Meninga | Bob Fulton |
| 1995 | England | Australia | Brad Fittler | Bob Fulton |
| 2000 | England; France; Ireland; Scotland; Wales | Australia | Brad Fittler | Chris Anderson |
| 2008 | Australia | New Zealand | Nathan Cayless | Stephen Kearney |
| 2013 | England; Wales; France; Ireland | Australia | Cameron Smith | Tim Sheens |
| 2017 | Australia; New Zealand; Papua New Guinea | Australia | Cameron Smith | Mal Meninga |
| 2021 | England | Australia | James Tedesco | Mal Meninga |
| 2026 | Australia; New Zealand; Papua New Guinea | Australia | Isaah Yeo | Kevin Walters |

== Cancelled and postponed editions ==
| Year | Reason | Outcome |
|---|---|---|
| (France) 1965 | Poor attendance in the French leg of the 1963–64 Kangaroo tour | Cancelled; next edition Australia and New Zealand 1968 |
| (Australia) 1998 | Super League war | Cancelled; next edition England, France, Ireland, Scotland, and Wales 2000 |
| 2003 | Unsuccessful 2000 tournament | World Cup temporarily replaced by Tri-Nations |
| (England) (Wales) 2012 | Clash with 2012 Olympics | Played in 2013 |
| (England) 2021 | COVID-19 pandemic | Played in 2022, using "2021" as official name |
| (France) 2025 | Late host withdrawal | Replaced by 2026 World Cup |
