= Rugby League World Cup =

International rugby league football tournament

- Most recent tournament 2026 Men's Rugby League World Cup
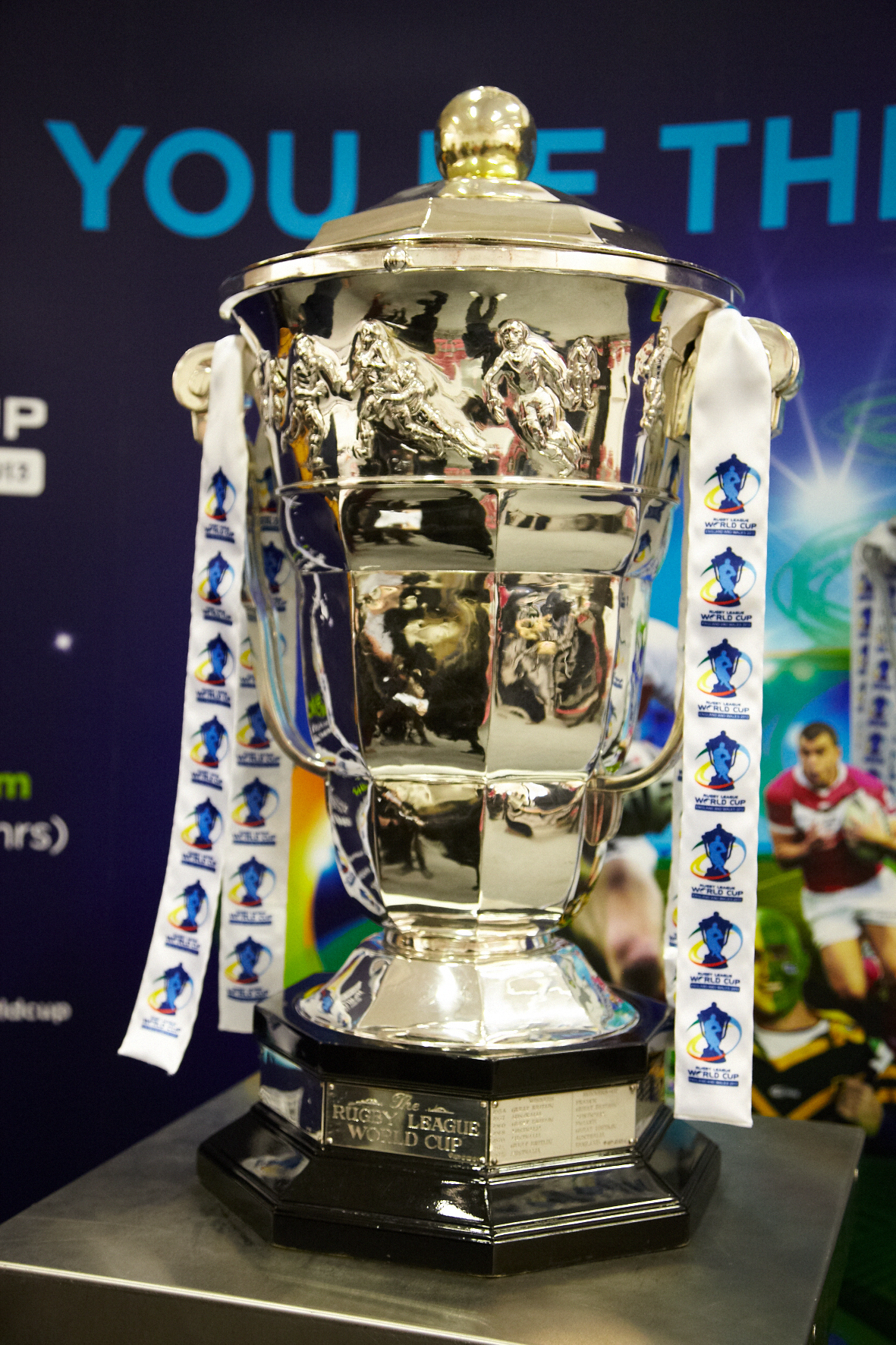
- Sport: Rugby league
- Instituted: 1954; 72 years ago
- Number of teams: 10 (from 2026 finals)
- Region: International (IRL)
- Holders: Australia (13th title)
- Most titles: Australia (13 titles)
- Website: www.rlwc2026.com
- Related competition: Women's World Cup; Wheelchair World Cup; World Cup 9s

The Rugby League World Cup is an international rugby league competition contested by senior men's national teams who each represent member nations of the International Rugby League who run and administer the tournament.

The tournament has been held with varying frequencies and formats throughout history, however is currently played every four years with a group and knockout structure in line with most other major sports competitions. The inaugural tournament was held in France in 1954, and was the first world cup held for any form of rugby football. The idea of the tournament was first proposed in France in the 1930s with the intent to hold a tournament in 1931. A second failed attempt came in 1951.

The winners are awarded the Paul Barrière Trophy, named after Paul Barrière, the French Rugby League president of the 1940s and 1950s. Australia are the most successful team in the competition's history, winning the Paul Barrière Trophy thirteen times, and appearing in every final bar 1954. Great Britain have the second highest number of titles with three, and New Zealand have also won the tournament once.

The latest edition of World Cup was the 2026 tournament held in Australia, New Zealand and Papua New Guinea. Australia are the reigning champions.

The next World Cup will be held in 2030 in the United States for the first time.

== History ==
=== Pre–1994: Original round robin World Cup ===
==== 1935–1960: Establishment and triennial competitions ====
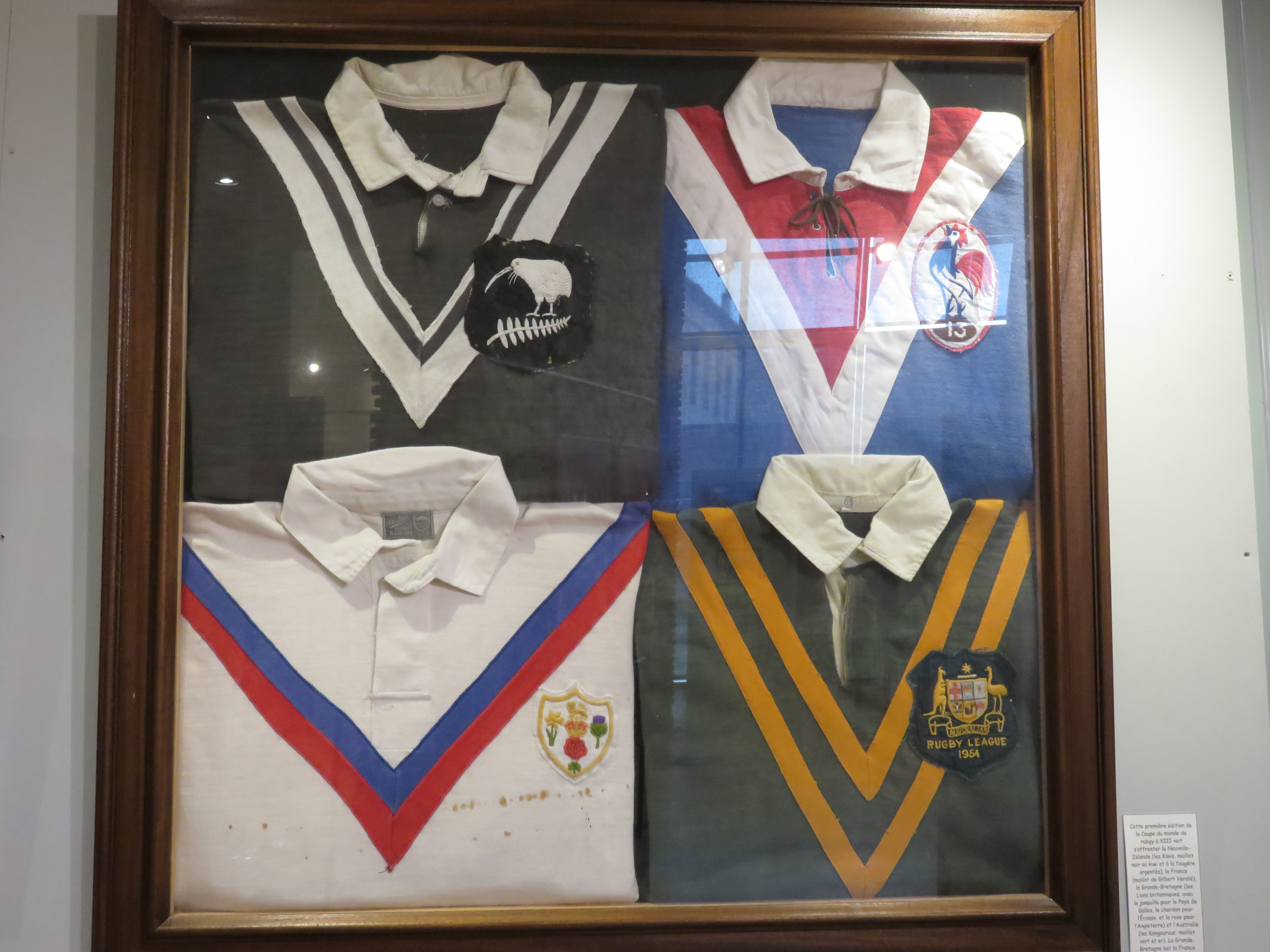
New Zealand (TL), France (TR), Great Britain (BL), and Australia (BR) shirts from the inaugural 1954 tournament. They were the four nations to compete in the competition until the 1980s.

The Rugby League World Cup was an initiative of the French who had been campaigning for a competition since 1935. The idea was raised in 1951 by Paul Barrière, the President of the French Rugby League. In 1952, Rugby Football League secretary Bill Fallowfield persuaded the Rugby League Council to support the concept. At a meeting in Blackpool, England in 1953, the International Board accepted Paul Barrière's proposal that France should be the nation to host the first tournament to be officially known as the "Rugby World Cup". In addition to the hosts, the tournament featured teams from Britain, Australia and New Zealand. The 1954 Rugby League World Cup was won by Great Britain who defeated France in Paris on 13 November to claim the title.

Following the success of the maiden World Cup three years later another tournament was held in Australia, marking 50 years of rugby league in the country. Unlike the previous tournament, teams played each other in a league format. It was then decided that the team that finished first in the league would be declared the winner. Australia proved victorious on their home ground.

Another three years would pass until the next World Cup in 1960, this time held in England. It would be the second time Great Britain won the competition. Despite a home nation victory the World Cup suffered from poor crowds due to the live broadcast of games for the first time.

==== 1960–1977: Sporadic competitions ====
After a disappointing attendances in 1960, the World Cup would not be played for another eight years. The competition had been scheduled to be held in France in 1965, this time with the inclusion of the South African team. However, after an unsuccessful tour of Australia, the French withdrew, effectively postponing the tournament until 1968, when Australia and New Zealand hosted and the World Cup final made a return.

The World Cup found more success in the 70s with four tournaments being played. The first, the 1972 World Cup where the final was contested between Great Britain and Australia ended 10–10, and the title was awarded to Great Britain by virtue of their superior record in the qualifiers. Great Britain were captained by Welshman Clive Sullivan who was the first black player to captain any British national sports team. The final at the Stade de Gerland in Lyon witnessed what is (as of 2021) the last British team to win the Rugby League World Cup.

In 1975, the competition underwent a radical overhaul with the tournament being held across multiple confederations. Great Britain was split into England and Wales due to Wales wanting to showcase the high level of talent they had on offer that year (no Scottish or Irish players made the original Great Britain squad). This resulted in the tournament increasing from four teams to five for the first time. There was not a final held to decide the champions of the 1975 tournament and so Australia won by virtue of topping the group standings. As Australia had not beaten England in that tournament a final challenge match was hastily arranged which Australia would win 25–0.

In 1977, Great Britain competed again as a single entity. Although the final between Australia and Great Britain was a closely fought affair, public interest in the tournament waned due to the continuing tinkering with the format and it was not held again until the mid-1980s.

==== 1982–1994: No host nation and first expansion ====
From 1985 to 1988, each nation played each other a number of times on a home and away basis with a number of these games also being considered part of various international tours that took place during the years in which these world cups were being played. At the end of that period, Australia met New Zealand at Eden Park. The match was a physical encounter, and Australian captain Wally Lewis played part of the match with a broken arm. The Kangaroos won the competition 25–12 in front of a capacity crowd of nearly 48,000 spectators.

This format was repeated from 1989 to 1992 (with games once again also being part of tours) and Australia won again, defeating Great Britain 10–6 at Wembley Stadium in front of 73,361 people. This crowd remained a Rugby League World Cup record (and a record for any rugby league international match) until beaten by the 74,468 crowd which attended the 2013 World Cup final at Old Trafford. The fifth nation to compete in these two tournaments was Papua New Guinea, where rugby league is the national, and most popular sport.

=== 1995–present: The modern World Cup ===
==== 1995: Birth of the modern World Cup ====
In 1995, the competition was held in England and Wales. It was again restructured, returning to the traditional "host / co-host" format, and intended (like in 1954) to be a triennial competition. The tournament expanded to ten teams with Fiji, Samoa, South Africa, and Tonga making their world cup debuts. Great Britain had also split permanently into England, Scotland, Wales, and Ireland, although only England and Wales qualified. Unlike previous tournaments where the top two teams in the table played in the final, a knockout stage was added, with quarter and semi-finals. Due to the Super League war, players aligned with the Super League competition were not selected by the ARL to represent Australia, which meant the absence of many star players. The tournament, which was also held to celebrate the centenary of the sport, saw over 250,000 people attending the group stages and over 66,000 people attending the final, in which Australia defeated England 16–8.

==== 2000: Super League delay, financial issues, and hiatus ====
Intended for 1998, the next World Cup was delayed for two years due to the Super League war and the subsequent re-structuring of rugby league's international governing bodies meant that the proposed 1998 World Cup was postponed.

In 2000, the World Cup was held in the United Kingdom, Ireland, and France, and expanded the field further, with sixteen teams entering. This tournament included a New Zealand Maori representative team, the only time this team has taken part, as well as debuts for the Cook Islands, Ireland, Russia, and Scotland. Australia won the tournament by beating New Zealand 40–12 in the final at Old Trafford, Manchester. In the same year, the first Women's Rugby League World Cup was held, with New Zealand defeating Great Britain in the final.

Numerous issues, including poor organisation and blown-out scorelines, meant that this tournament was seen as highly unsuccessful with an average attendance just half that of the previous tournament.

==== 2000–2008: Hiatus ====
After the failure of the 2000 World Cup, the scheduled 2003 World Cup did not see any formal planning. A plan to hold a tournament in 2005 was also put on ice. The Rugby League World Cup was replaced by the Rugby League Tri-Nations as the RLIF's pinnacle competition, reviving the 1999 tri-series competition initially intended as a one-off.

==== 2008: Re-establishment and regular competitions ====
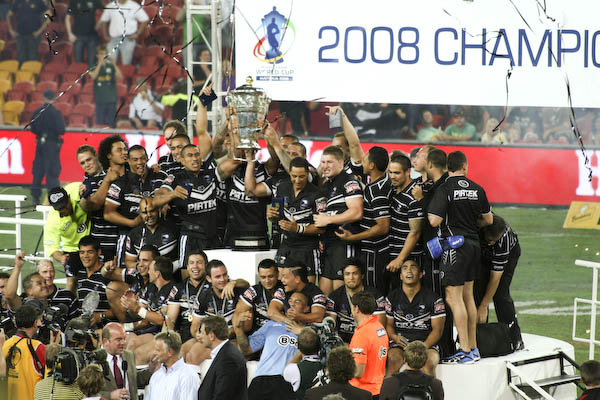
New Zealand lifting the Paul Barrière Trophy after winning the 2008 tournament

The Rugby League World Cup returned in 2008 as part of Australia's centenary celebrations of rugby league being played in the country. The competition reverted to a 10-team format, resembling as almost identical format to the 1995 edition. The tournament also moved from every three to every four years inline with most other major international sports competitions. The tournament saw New Zealand were crowned champions for the first time by beating the host nation at Lang Park, Brisbane. New Zealand became only the third team to win the world cup and the first other than Australia since Great Britain's last win in 1972. The tournament was once again seen as a success with a 91% average attendance increase on the previous competition.

==== 2013: Olympic delay and tournament growth ====
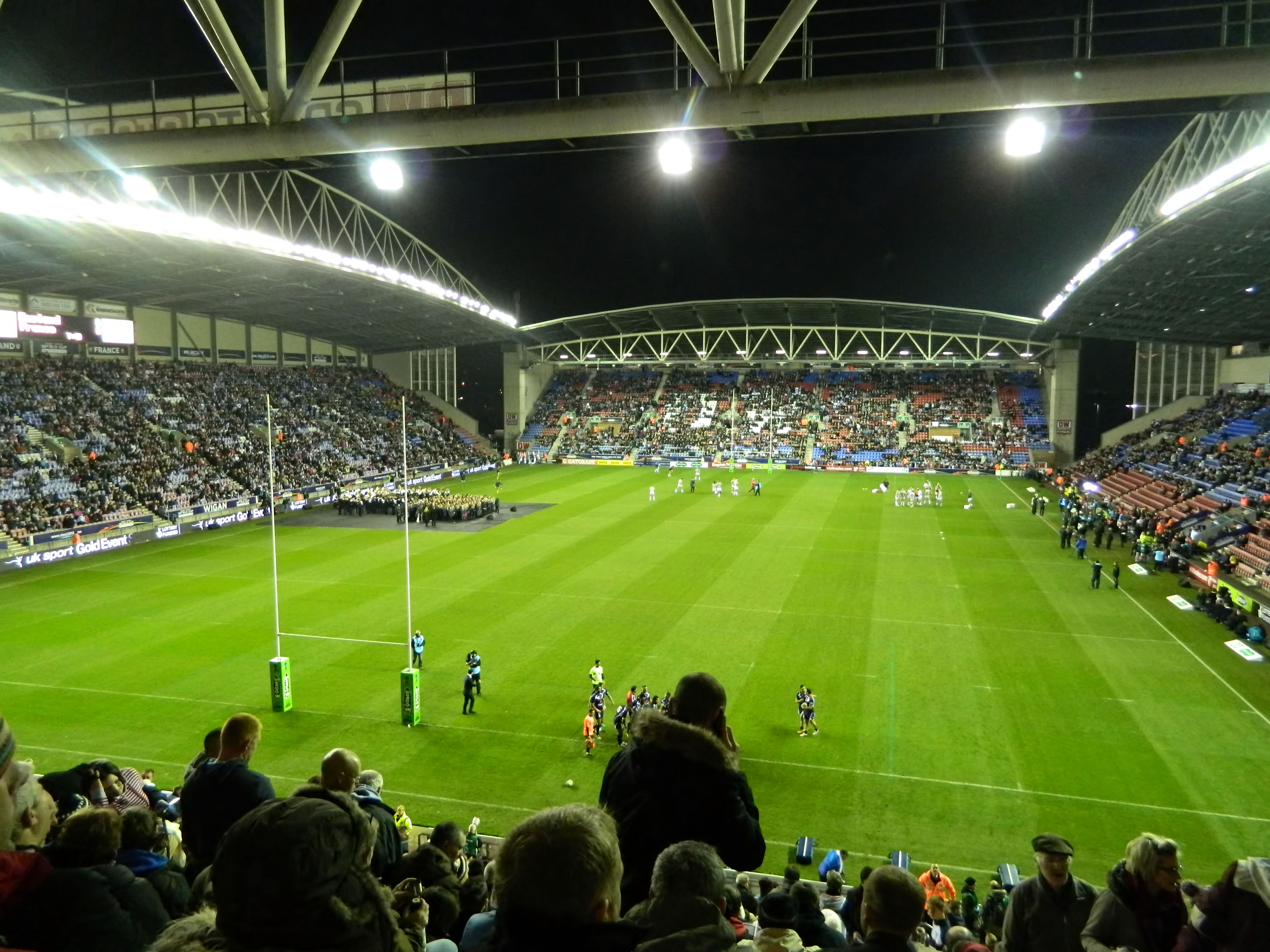
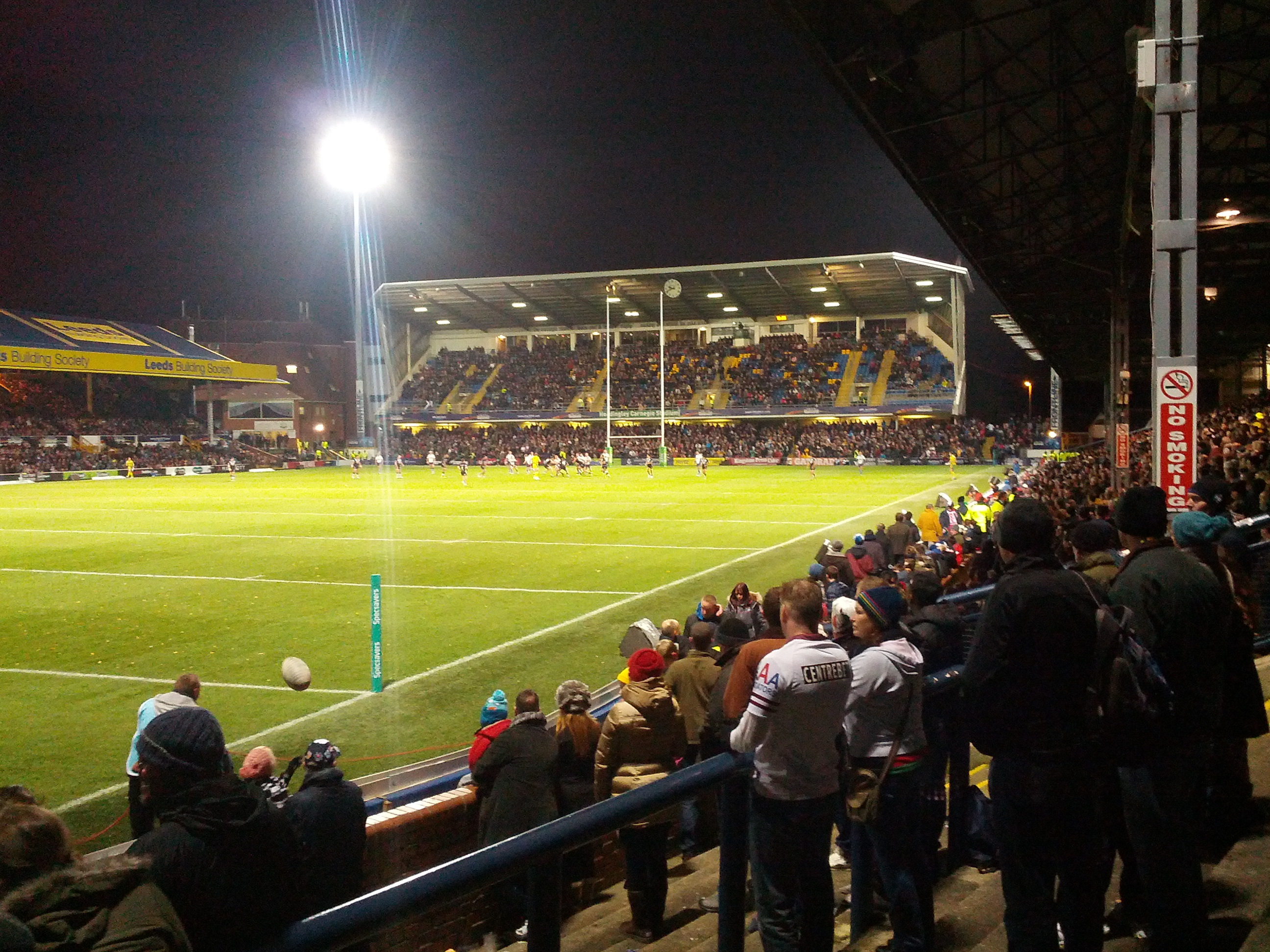
Matches of the 2013 Rugby League World Cup at the DW Stadium and Headingley.

2013 saw England and Wales host the tournament, beating a bid from Australia. The tournament was expanded to 14 teams for this edition, and was originally scheduled for 2012, but was moved very early in its organisation to 2013 due to the United Kingdom hosting the 2012 Summer Olympics. The tournament saw Italy and the United States play in their first world cup. Australia took the title again after defeating New Zealand in the final by a score of 34–2. The final attendance became the record international rugby league attendance at 74,468. The competition was considered the most successful competition to date. The tournament delivered record profits of £3.7 million, and saw a direct economic impact of £9.6 million. The tournament was watched by 450,000 spectators and a further 18.8 million on television, with an estimated 14% never having been to a rugby league event prior to the tournament.

==== 2017: Continued growth ====
2017 Rugby League World Cup taking place in Australia, New Zealand and for the first time in Papua New Guinea. While Australia would claim the title once again and for an eleventh time, the tournament was considered highly successful in terms of competitiveness. The tournament would see Tonga beat New Zealand in the group stages with a score of 28–22 to top the group, the first time a team from outside the top 3 had beaten a top 3 nation in over two decades. New Zealand went on to play Fiji in the quarter-finals and lost once again with a score of just 4–2, knocking New Zealand out in the quarter-finals, the first time a tier 1 nation had exited the tournament at this early stage. Tonga played England in the semi-finals and while conceding 20 unanswered points, they would score 3 tries in just the last seven minutes to pull the score back to 20–18, eventually losing by this close margin. The final was contested between Australia and England at Lang Park, Brisbane and Australia won by just 6–0, the lowest score in world cup final history.

==== 2021–22: Further growth despite COVID-19 impact ====
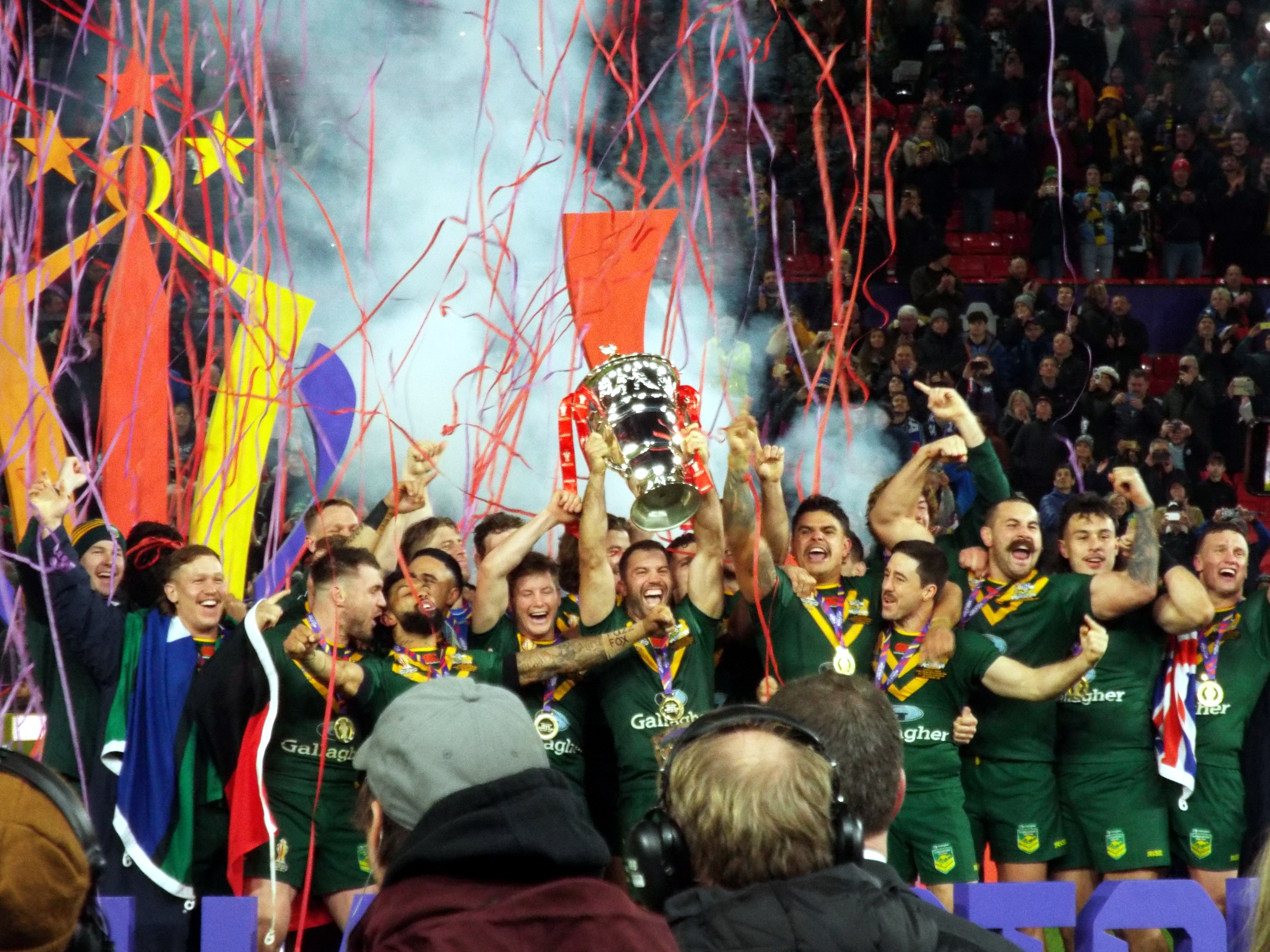
Australia lifting the Paul Barrière Trophy after winning the 2021 tournament

England were chosen to host the 2021 tournament which was postponed to 2022 due to Australia and New Zealand withdrawing due to the COVID-19 pandemic. with organisers expressing a desire to see a total of one million fans attend games. This tournament saw the number of teams increased to 16 once again, with Greece and Jamaica debuting in the competition. In 2021, the women's and wheelchair competitions were given equal prominence with the men's tournament, as a result all three competition were run simultaneously for the first time. Australia again won the competition, beating final debutants Samoa 30–10. The 2021 tournament was the most watched rugby league world cup in history, and was regarded as a sporting, commercial, and social success by the IRL.

==== 2025–26: Hosting issues ====
Australia lifting the Paul Barrière Trophy after winning the 2026 tournament

A proposal was put forward in 2016 to hold the 2025 Rugby League World Cup in the United States and Canada, but in December 2018 plans for the tournament to be held in North America were scrapped due to financial concerns.

On 11 January 2022, the IRL announced France would host the tournament in 2025, however on 15 May 2023 France pulled out of hosting the tournament after a newly elected French government withdrew financial support. A day later, New Zealand announced they were considering a bid, but would possibly require a delay to 2026.

On 3 August, the IRL announced that the tournament would be postponed to 2026 and held in the southern hemisphere with only 10 teams taking part. It was later confirmed on 24 July 2024 that Australia would host the tournament with a number of games co-hosted by Papua New Guinea.

Fixtures for the tournament were announced on 23 November 2025, and would see the quarter finals scrapped for the 2026 edition with only four teams advancing to the knockouts.

==== 2030: New hosts and format ====
With the announcement of the 2025 World Cup being moved to 2026 came confirmation that the following men's competition would be held in 2030. In the announcement International Rugby League confirmed that the tournament would be held once again as a stand alone competition with the women's and wheelchair tournaments held separately in 2028 and 2029 respectively, all on a four-year cycle. In December 2025, the IRL announced a reversal of this decision and will continue holding the three world cup competitions concurrently, thus postponing the 2028 Women and 2029 Wheelchair tournaments to 2030.

On 9 November 2026, it was confirmed that the tournament would be hosted across the United States and the Pacific, but organised by the Australian Rugby League Commission. The competition will see five cities hosting over five weeks with the group stages to be held in a "Magic Weekend" style format.

== Trophy ==
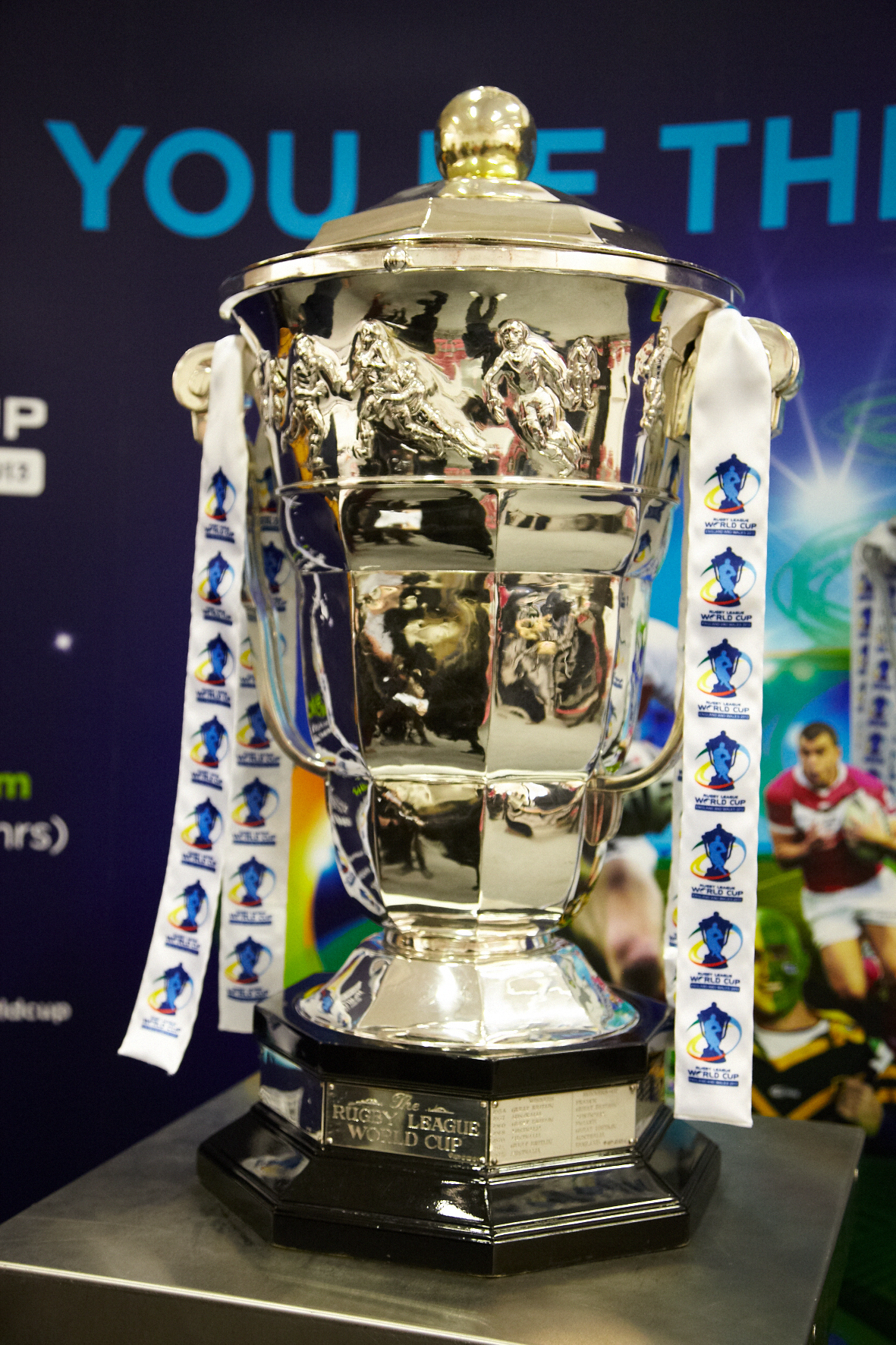
The Paul Barrière Trophy first awarded in the 1954 inaugural contest.

The World Cup trophy was commissioned by French Fédération Française de Rugby à XIII president Paul Barrière at a cost of eight million francs, and then donated to the International Rugby League Board to be used for the inaugural competition in 1954. This trophy was used and presented to the winning nation for the first four tournaments, before being stolen in 1970. After its recovery, the trophy was reinstated for the 2000 tournament.

== Format ==
=== Qualification ===
Qualifying rounds were first introduced for the 2000 World Cup. Hosts and teams reaching the knockout rounds of the previous tournament automatically qualify for the next. The remaining spots are achieved through regional qualification tournaments, split between the four International Rugby League confederation Asia-Pacific, Americas, Europe, and Middle East-Africa. Because of a changing number of teams making the finals and entering the qualifiers, and the unpredictability of the geographic spread of teams automatically qualifying, the format of the qualification tournament has changed with each edition of the tournament.

=== Finals ===
The Rugby League World Cup has followed a varied range of formats throughout its history as the number of teams participating has increased.

In the 2026 ten-team tournament, there are three pools, A, B, and C, with pools B and C being effectively combined. Pool A features four teams, while Pool B and C have three members each. In the group stage, the members of Pool A will all play each other over three rounds. The members of Pool B and Pool C play all the members of the opposing pool (ie. Pool B plays all the members of Pool C and vice versa), over three rounds.

The top two members of Pool A and the top two members of combined six-team Pool B/C will then advance to the semi-finals. If the teams are level after 80 minutes extra time will be played and if the two teams are still level after extra time, a golden point will be played.

The 2021 and 2000 tournaments featured 16 teams split into four groups of four playing a single round robin. Each team was awarded two points for a win and one point for a draw. The top two teams from each group qualified for the knockout stage.

== Hosts ==
Due to the early World Cups being contested between Australia, England, France and New Zealand and the fact rugby league is most popular in these regions they have regularly hosted the World Cup between themselves. World Cups in 1985–88 and 1989–92 were all jointly hosted by the four founding nations.

New Zealand has never solely hosted a World Cup but they have co-hosted with Australia on three occasions with 2017 also jointly co-hosted with Papua New Guinea. England have co-hosted once with Wales in 2013 although the 2000 World Cup was played across the UK as well as some games in Ireland and France.

France hosted the first World Cup in 1954 and again in 1972 as well as hosting games at the 2000 and 2013 World Cups.

Despite the World Cup mainly being hosted by England, Australia, France and New Zealand, countries such as UAE, South Africa and the United States and Canada have applied to host the tournament in the past.

Total of World Cup competitions hosted by each confederation (1954–2026) Confederation and year in bold has an upcoming competition.
| Confederation | Total | Hosts |
|---|---|---|
| Asia-Pacific | 6 | 1957: Australia; 1968: Australia, New Zealand; 1975: Australia, New Zealand*; 1977: Australia, New Zealand; 2008: Australia; 2017: Australia, New Zealand, Papua New Guinea; 2026: Australia |
| Europe | 9 | 1954: France; 1960: Great Britain; 1970: Great Britain; 1972: France, 1975: France, Great Britain*; 1995: England, Wales; 2000: England, France, Ireland, Scotland, Wales; 2013: England, Wales; 2021: England |
| Middle East-Africa | 0 | |
| Americas | 0 | |

- Co-hosted between confederation

NB: As Great Britain was the IRL nation until 1995, the United Kingdom is used to refer to host nations before this time regardless of the number of home nations which actually hosted the tournament.

=== Stadiums ===
In total, 98 stadiums have hosted World Cup games over the 17 tournaments. Headingley Stadium in Leeds and Lang Park in Brisbane have hosted the tournament the most times, having had games in eight World Cups, whilst Central Park, Wigan hosted six tournaments. 52 stadiums have hosted matches in just one tournament. The most stadiums used in a tournament was in 2000 when 26 stadiums were used; the stadium capacity was the highest ever at 704,400. However, the occupancy was also the lowest ever at just 37.46%.

The largest stadium in terms of capacity ever used was Wembley Stadium, London with a seating capacity of 90,000; the stadium was used in the 2013 tournament as the venue for the semi-final double-header. The smallest stadium ever used was also in 2013 when The Gnoll, Neath, with a capacity of 5,000 hosted a game between Wales and Cook Islands. Despite this, it was not the lowest attended game; this was in the 2000 World Cup when just 1,497 attended the game between Wales and Lebanon at Stradey Park, Llanelli.

The city with the most stadiums used is Sydney with six each, followed by London with four.

| Rank | Country | Stadiums |
|---|---|---|
| 1 | England | 39 |
| 2 | Australia | 24 |
| 3 | France | 13 |
| 5 | New Zealand | 8 |
| 4 | Wales | 7 |
| 6 | Ireland | 3 |
| 7 | Papua New Guinea | 2 |
| 7 | Scotland | 2 |

== Results ==
| Ed. | Year | Host | Final | | | Third & fourth place / losing semi-finalists | | Teams |
| Ed. | Year | Host | Winners | Score | Runners-up | Third place | Fourth place | Teams |
|---|---|---|---|---|---|---|---|---|
| 1 | 1954 | France | Great Britain | 16–12 | France | Australia | New Zealand | 4 |
| 2 | 1957 | Australia | Australia | round-robin | Great Britain | New Zealand | France | 4 |
| 3 | 1960 | United Kingdom | Great Britain | round-robin | Australia | New Zealand | France | 4 |
| 4 | 1968 | Australia; New Zealand | Australia | 20–2 | France | Great Britain | New Zealand | 4 |
| 5 | 1970 | United Kingdom | Australia | 12–7 | Great Britain | France | New Zealand | 4 |
| 6 | 1972 | France | Great Britain | 10–10 (a.e.t.) (Note: Despite the 1972 Final ending in a draw, Great Britain were awarded the World Cup having finished top in the group stage.) | Australia | France | New Zealand | 4 |
| 7 | 1975 | Australia; France; New Zealand; United Kingdom | Australia | round-robin (Note: Despite a game being played after the final Group game, this was not a Final as Australia had already been crowned Champions.) | England | Wales | New Zealand | 5 (Note: the 1975 World Cup was expanded to 5 teams as England and Wales entered instead of Great Britain. No Scottish or Irish players made the original Great Britain squad.) |
| 8 | 1977 | Australia; New Zealand | Australia | 13–12 | Great Britain | New Zealand | France | 4 |
| 9 | 1985–1988 | Home-and-away basis | Australia | 25–12 | New Zealand | Great Britain | Papua New Guinea | 5 |
| 10 | 1989–1992 | Home-and-away basis | Australia | 10–6 | Great Britain | New Zealand | France | 5 |
| 11 | 1995 | England; Wales | Australia | 16–8 | England | New Zealand and Wales | | 10 |
| 12 | 2000 | England; France; Ireland; Scotland; Wales | Australia | 40–12 | New Zealand | England and Wales | | 16 |
| 13 | 2008 | Australia | New Zealand | 34–20 | Australia | England and Fiji | | 10 |
| 14 | 2013 (Note: Originally scheduled for 2012 and postponed to 2013 due to the United kingdom hosting the 2012 Summer Olympics) | England; Wales (Note: Despite England and Wales being the sole designated hosts, some matches were played in Ireland and France) | Australia | 34–2 | New Zealand | England and Fiji | | 14 |
| 15 | 2017 | Australia; New Zealand; Papua New Guinea | Australia | 6–0 | England | Fiji and Tonga | | 14 |
| 16 | 2022 (Note: Originally scheduled for 2021 and postponed to 2022 due to the COVID-19 pandemic) | England | Australia | 30–10 | Samoa | England and New Zealand | | 16 |
| 17 | 2026 | Australia (Note: Despite Australia being the sole designated hosts, some matches were played in Papua New Guinea and New Zealand) | Australia | 32–12 | New Zealand | Samoa and Tonga | | 10 |
| 18 | 2030 | United States | Future events | | | Future events | | 12 |

=== Summary ===
In total, 21 teams have competed at the World Cup. Of these, only three have won the World Cup, with Australia being by far the most successful with 13 titles. Great Britain has won three titles, but since 1995 have competed separately as England, Wales, Scotland and Ireland. New Zealand became only the third team to win the World Cup in 2008. England, France and Samoa are the only teams to have played in the final and not won. Wales' best result was third under the old format and have made the semi-finals twice while Fiji have appeared in three while Tonga have made the semi-finals just once. Papua New Guinea achieved fourth place under the old format and have made it to three quarter-finals. Four other teams; Ireland, Lebanon, Scotland and the USA have all made the quarter-finals bringing the total number of teams to reach the knockout stage to 14.

Top four finishes
| Team | Champions | Runners-up | Third / Fourth / Semi-finals | Top four total |
|---|---|---|---|---|
| Australia | 13 (1957, 1968, 1970, 1975, 1977, 1988, 1992, 1995, 2000, 2013, 2017, 2021, 2026) | 3 (1960, 1972, 2008) | 1 (1954) | 17 |
| Great Britain (Note: Great Britain ceased to compete in the World Cup from 1995 onwards with independent governing bodies for Scotland and Wales affiliating themselves with the IRL in 1994 and 1995 respectfully) | 3 (1954, 1960, 1972) | 4 (1957, 1970, 1977, 1992) | 2 (1968, 1988) | 9 |
| New Zealand | 1 (2008) | 4 (1985–88, 2000, 2013, 2026) | 11 (1954, 1957, 1960, 1968, 1970, 1972, 1975, 1977, 1992, 1995, 2021) | 16 |
| England | | 3 (1975, 1995, 2017) | 4 (2000, 2008, 2013, 2021) | 7 |
| France | | 2 (1954, 1968) | 6 (1957, 1960, 1970, 1972, 1977, 1992) | 8 |
| Samoa | | 1 (2021) | 1 (2026) | 2 |
| Wales | | | 3 (1975, 1995, 2000) | 3 |
| Fiji | | | 3 (2008, 2013, 2017) | 3 |
| Tonga | | | 2 (2017, 2026) | 2 |
| Papua New Guinea | | | 1 (1988) | 1 |

== Records ==
=== Attendance ===
| Year | Hosts | Matches | Avg. attendance | Total attendance | Highest attendances | | |
| Year | Hosts | Matches | Avg. attendance | Total attendance | Figure | Venue | Match(es) |
|---|---|---|---|---|---|---|---|
| 1954 | France | 7 | 19,761 | 138,329 | 37,471 | Stadium de Toulouse | France 13–13 Great Britain; Group Stage |
| 1957 | Australia | 6 | 35,820 | 214,918 | 58,655 | Sydney Cricket Ground | Australia 31–6 Great Britain |
| 1960 | United Kingdom | 6 | 18,376 | 110,200 | 33,023 | Odsal Stadium | Great Britain 10–3 Australia |
| 1968 | Australia New Zealand | 7 | 31,562 | 220,683 | 62,256 | Sydney Cricket Ground | Australia 25–10 Great Britain; Group Stage |
| 1970 | United Kingdom | 7 | 9,816 | 68,710 | 18,775 | Headingley | Great Britain 7–12 Australia; Final |
| 1972 | France | 7 | 8,922 | 62,456 | 20,748 | Stade Vélodrome | France 20–9 New Zealand; Group Stage |
| 1975 | Australia France New Zealand United Kingdom | 21 | 9,737 | 204,476 | 33,858 | Sydney Cricket Ground | Australia 10–10 England; Group Stage |
| 1977 | Australia New Zealand | 7 | 15,670 | 109,688 | 27,000 | Lang Park | Australia 19–5 Great Britain; Group Stage |
| 1985–88 | No fixed host | 18 | 12,125 | 218,246 | 47,363 | Eden Park | New Zealand 12–25 Australia; Final |
| 1989–92 | No fixed host | 21 | 14,289 | 300,059 | 73,631 | Old Wembley Stadium | Great Britain 6–10 Australia; Final |
| 1995 | England | 15 | 17,707 | 265,609 | 66,540 | Old Wembley Stadium | England 8–16 Australia; Final |
| 2000 | England France Ireland; Scotland Wales | 31 | 8,514 | 263,921 | 44,329 | Old Trafford | Australia 40–12 New Zealand; Final |
| 2008 | Australia | 18 | 16,302 | 293,442 | 50,599 | Lang Park | Australia 20–34 New Zealand; Final |
| 2013 | England Wales | 28 | 16,374 | 458,483 | 74,468 | Old Trafford | Australia 34–2 New Zealand; Final |
| 2017 | Australia New Zealand; Papua New Guinea | 28 | 13,338 | 373,461 | 40,033 | Lang Park | Australia 6–0 England; Final |
| 2021 | England | 31 | 13,667 | 423,689 | 67,502 | Old Trafford | Australia 30–10 Samoa; Final |
| 2026 | Australia New Zealand; Papua New Guinea | 18 | 23,485 | 422,738 | 52,461 | Lang Park | Australia 32–12 New Zealand; Final |
| Total | —N/a | 276 | 15,033 | 4,149,108 | 74,468 | Old Trafford | Australia 34–2 New Zealand 2013 Final |

=== Match attendance ===
Top 10 match attendances.
The breakdown of nations per appearance is: Australia (10), Great Britain (3), England (3), New Zealand (3), France (1), Fiji (1), Samoa (1).

| Rank | Attendance | Stadium | Year | Stage |
|---|---|---|---|---|
| 1 | 74,468 | Old Trafford | 2013 | Final |
| 2 | 73,631 | Wembley Stadium (1923) | 1989–92 | Final |
| 3 | 67,575 | Wembley Stadium | 2013 | Semi-final double header |
| 4 | 67,502 | Old Trafford | 2021 | Final |
| 5 | 66,540 | Wembley Stadium (1923) | 1995 | Final |
| 6 | 62,256 | Sydney Cricket Ground | 1968 | Group stage |
| 7 | 58,655 | Sydney Cricket Ground | 1957 | Group stage |
| 8 | 54,290 | Sydney Cricket Ground | 1968 | Final |
| 9 | 52,461 | Lang Park | 2026 | Final |
| 10 | 50,599 | Lang Park | 2008 | Final |

=== Debut of national teams ===
| Year | Nation(s) | Total |
|---|---|---|
| 1954 | Australia; France; Great Britain; New Zealand | 4 |
| 1957 | (none) | 0 |
| 1960 | (none) | 0 |
| 1968 | (none) | 0 |
| 1970 | (none) | 0 |
| 1972 | (none) | 0 |
| 1975 | England (Note: England and Wales competed individually at the 1975 Rugby League World Cup as a one off. There regular appearances in the competition not under Great Britain began in 1995.); Wales | 2 |
| 1977 | (none) | 0 |
| 1985-1988 | Papua New Guinea | 1 |
| 1989-1992 | (none) | 0 |
| 1995 | Fiji; Samoa; South Africa; Tonga | 4 |
| 2000 | Aotearoa Māori; Cook Islands; Ireland; Lebanon; Russia; Scotland | 6 |
| 2008 | (none) | 0 |
| 2013 | Italy; United States | 2 |
| 2017 | (none) | 0 |
| 2021 | Greece; Jamaica | 2 |
| 2026 | (none) | 0 |

== See also ==
- Women's Rugby League World Cup
- Wheelchair Rugby League World Cup
- International Rugby League
- List of rugby league competitions
- Rugby League World Cup 9s
- Tertiary Student Rugby League World Cup
