= 2030 Men's Rugby League World Cup =

Eighteenth staging of the Men's Rugby League World Cup

- Number of teams: 12
- Host country: United States
- Matches played: 21

The 2030 Men's Rugby League World Cup will be the eighteenth staging of the Rugby League World Cup, and will be one of three major tournaments part of the 2030 Rugby League World Cup.

The competition will be held during October and November 2030 in the United States alongside the women's tournament. There will be 12 teams competing, an increase from the 10 in 2026. The tournament will be organised and run by the Australian Rugby League Commission and National Rugby League.

== Background ==
Following the withdrawal of France as host of the 2025 Rugby League World Cups, the International Rugby League (IRL) recognised it would become increasingly difficult for one or two nations to host three growing tournaments.

On 3 August 2023, the IRL announced the men's tournament would continue on a four-year cycle with the next edition taking place in 2026 (four years after the postponed 2021 tournament) and held concurrently with the women's and wheelchair tournaments. The following men's event would take place in 2030 with the next women's tournament taking place as a stand-alone event in 2028 before continuing on a four-year cycle. The decision was made to ease the strain on future hosts. The same decision was made on 13 November for the wheelchair tournament for the same reason, with their new four-year cycle starting in 2029.

Before 2017 the women's tournament was played in build up to the men's tournament as was the wheelchair tournament before 2021, both being played as part of the Festival of World Cups.

In December 2025, the IRL announced a U-turn decision, to continue holding the men's, women's, and wheelchair world cups concurrently. Further, the World Cup will remain available for only full member nations.

== Host selection ==
On 13 November 2023, the IRL confirmed seven nations had expressed interest in hosting the 2030 World Cup.

On 29 July 2024, the IRL announced Kenya, New Zealand, Papua New Guinea, South Africa, and the United States had bid to host the tournament.

On 9 November 2026, it was confirmed that the tournament would be hosted across the United States and the Pacific, but organised by the Australian Rugby League Commission. The competition will see five cities hosting.

== Format ==
The competition will see five cities hosting over five weeks with the group stages to be held in a "Magic Weekend" style format followed by semi-finals and the final.

== Teams ==
=== Qualification ===
In 2023, it was determined that the top 8 ranked nations in the IRL Men's World Rankings in December 2028 will qualify for the tournament. This was reconfirmed at the International Rugby League press conference on 9 November 2026. The remaining four teams will be determined through a regional championship model that feeds into a World Series that will be held in 2029.

Team	Method of qualification	Date of qualification	Total times qualified	Last time qualified	Current consecutive appearances	Previous best performance
Australia	Top 8 ranked sides as of December 2028 (teams shown are the current top 8)	December 2028	Teams yet to be determined			
New Zealand	Top 8 ranked sides as of December 2028 (teams shown are the current top 8)	December 2028	Teams yet to be determined			
England	Top 8 ranked sides as of December 2028 (teams shown are the current top 8)	December 2028	Teams yet to be determined			
Samoa	Top 8 ranked sides as of December 2028 (teams shown are the current top 8)	December 2028	Teams yet to be determined			
Tonga	Top 8 ranked sides as of December 2028 (teams shown are the current top 8)	December 2028	Teams yet to be determined			
Papua New Guinea	Top 8 ranked sides as of December 2028 (teams shown are the current top 8)	December 2028	Teams yet to be determined			
Fiji	Top 8 ranked sides as of December 2028 (teams shown are the current top 8)	December 2028	Teams yet to be determined			
Cook Islands	Top 8 ranked sides as of December 2028 (teams shown are the current top 8)	December 2028	Teams yet to be determined			
TBC	Qualification tournament	2029	Teams yet to be determined			
TBC	Qualification tournament	2029	Teams yet to be determined			
TBC	Qualification tournament	2029	Teams yet to be determined			
TBC	Qualification tournament	2029	Teams yet to be determined			

== See also ==
- 2030 Women's Rugby League World Cup
- 2030 Wheelchair Rugby League World Cup
