= 2030 Wheelchair Rugby League World Cup =

Seventh staging of the Wheelchair Rugby League World Cup

- Number of teams: 8
- Host country: France

The 2030 Wheelchair Rugby League World Cup will be the sixth staging of the Wheelchair Rugby League World Cup, and will be one of three major tournaments as part of the 2030 Rugby League World Cup although it will not be played in the same country as the men's and women's tournaments.

The competition is expected to be held in during October and November 2030.

== Background ==
Following the withdrawal of France as host of the 2025 Rugby League World Cups, the International Rugby League (IRL) recognised it would become increasingly difficult for one or two nations to host three growing tournaments.

On 3 August 2023, the IRL announced that the women's tournament would become a stand-alone event starting in 2028, reflecting the tournament's "phenomenal rate of growth" and to ease the stain on future hosts. The same decision was made at the later date of 13 November for the wheelchair tournament for the same reason, with the first standalone edition taking place in 2029.

The wheelchair tournament became a primary event in 2021, with the 2021 World Cup the first to be held concurrently with the men's. Prior to this, the wheelchair tournament was played as part of the Festival of World Cups in build up to the men's event.

In December 2025, the IRL announced a U-turn decision, to continue holding the men's, women's, and wheelchair world cups concurrently, thus postponing the 2029 Wheelchair World Cup to 2030.

== Host selection ==
On 13 November 2023, the IRL confirmed five nations had expressed interest in hosting the 2028 World Cup.

On 30 July 2024, the IRL announced England, France, and the United States had bid to host the tournament.

In November 2026, France was announced as the tournament hosts, separate to the men's and women's competitions which will be held in the United States.

== See also ==
- 2030 Men's Rugby League World Cup
- 2030 Women's Rugby League World Cup
