= Paul Barrière =

French rugby league administrator

Paul Barrière (8 June 1920 – 29 May 2008) was a French rugby footballer and president of the Fédération Française de Rugby à XIII from 1947 to 1955.

== Biography ==
Paul Barrière was born on 8 June 1920 in Espéraza. Barrière played rugby union for Espéraza in 1936 and Carcassonne.

During World War II, Barrière joined the French Resistance and operated in Aude. Whilst in the resistance, he met French leaders of rugby league which had been banned by the collaborationist Vichy government.

After the war, Barrière, along with Marcel Laborde who served as president of the French Rugby League between 1944 and 1947, worked to re-establish rugby league, which had been severely disrupted. Barrière became vice-president of the French Rugby League on 16 September 1944 at the Hotel Regina in Toulouse. He was elected president on 2 July 1947 at a meeting in Bayonne. Barrière was the driving force behind the agreement to create the International Rugby League Board and to institute a World Cup. When asked for his opinion on moves to name the World Cup trophy after him, Barrière refused the honour.

Under Barrière, the French national team undertook its first tour of the southern hemisphere.

From 1990 until 2004 Barrière organised the Festival de la Cite in Carcassonne for musical theatre.

In 2008, Barrière was posthumously awarded the inaugural RLIF Spirit of Rugby League Award which was created to honour those deemed to have made a significant contribution to the sport during their lifetime.

Barrière died on 29 May 2008 in Biarritz, aged 88.. He was survived by his wife, Jeanine, and her daughter, Babette.

The Rugby League World Cup trophy was named the Paul Barrière Trophy, starting from the 2017 Rugby League World Cup.
