= 2030 Women's Rugby League World Cup =

Eighth staging of the Women's Rugby League World Cup

- Number of teams: 10
- Host country: United States
- Matches played: 18

The 2030 Women's Rugby League World Cup will be the eighth staging of the Women's Rugby League World Cup, and will be one of three major tournaments part of the 2030 Rugby League World Cup.

The competition will be held during October and November 2030 in the United States alongside the men's tournament. There will be ten teams competing, an increase from the eight in 2026. The tournament will be organised and run by the Australian Rugby League Commission and National Rugby League.

== Background ==
Following the withdrawal of France as host of the 2025 Rugby League World Cups, the International Rugby League (IRL) recognised it would become increasingly difficult for one or two nations to host three growing tournaments.

The women's tournament became a primary event in 2017, with the 2017 World Cup the first to be held concurrently with the men's. Prior to this the women's tournament was played as part of the Festival of World Cups in the build up to the men's event.

On 3 August 2023, the IRL announced that the women's tournament would become a stand alone event starting in 2028, reflecting the tournament's "phenomenal rate of growth" and to ease the strain on future hosts.

In December 2025, the IRL announced a reversal of this decision and will continue holding the three world cup competitions concurrently, thus postponing the 2028 Women's World Cup to 2030.

== Host selection ==
On 13 November 2023, the IRL confirmed eight nations had expressed interest in hosting the 2028 World Cup.

On 28 July 2024, the IRL announced France, Kenya, New Zealand, Papua New Guinea, and South Africa had bid to host the tournament.

On 9 November 2026, it was confirmed that the tournament would be hosted across the United States and the Pacific, but organised by the Australian Rugby League Commission. The competition will see five cities hosting.

== Format ==
The competition will see five cities hosting over five weeks with the group stages to be held in a "Magic Weekend" style format followed by semi-finals and the final.

== Teams ==
=== Qualification ===
At the International Rugby League press conference on 9 November 2026, it was announced that the ten participants will be comprised from teams that qualify on rankings plus teams that qualify through World Series to be held in 2029. The exact ratio of ranking qualifiers and World Series qualifiers is still to be determined. Teams will qualify for the World Series via regional championships.

== See also ==
- 2030 Men's Rugby League World Cup
- 2030 Wheelchair Rugby League World Cup
