= Paul Barrière Trophy =

Rugby League World Cup

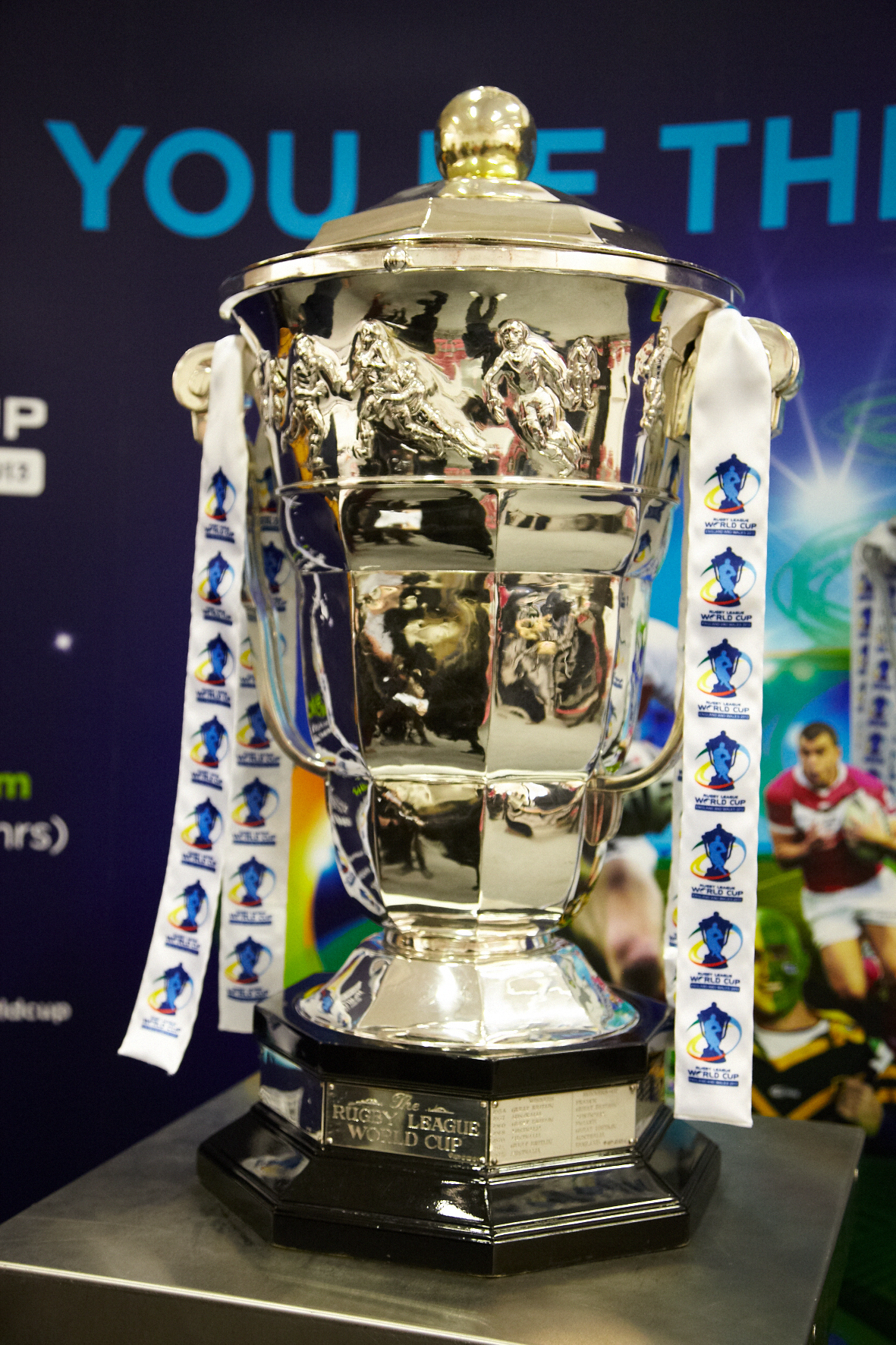
- The Paul Barrière Trophy
- Awarded for: Winning the Rugby League World Cup
- Presented by: International Rugby League

History
- First award: 1954
- Most recent: Australia

The Paul Barrière Trophy serves as the Rugby League World Cup, being awarded to the victorious team of each tournament's final. It is named after Paul Barrière, president of the Fédération Française de Rugby à XIII from 1947 to 1955.

== History ==
=== Original Trophy ===
The World Cup trophy was commissioned by French Fédération Française de Rugby à XIII president Paul Barrière at a cost of eight million francs, and then donated to the International Rugby League Board to be used for the inaugural competition in 1954. This trophy was used and presented to the winning nation for the first four tournaments, before being stolen in 1970.

=== Replacement trophies ===
While no trophy could be presented in 1970 due to the original's disappearance a few days before the final, several other trophies were used from 1972 until 1995. For the 1995 tournament, a £10,000 cup was made by Tiffanys to celebrate the centenary of the game.

=== Theft and recovery of original trophy ===
While competing in the 1970 tournament, reigning champions Australia put the trophy on display at the Midland Hotel, Bradford. The trophy was stolen from the hotel on the night of Sunday, 1 November 1970, six days before the final, and remained unseen for the next twenty years. Before the theft, the trophy was last held aloft by Johnny Raper after Australia's 20-2 win over France at the Sydney Cricket Ground on 10 June 1968 to claim the fourth World Cup title.

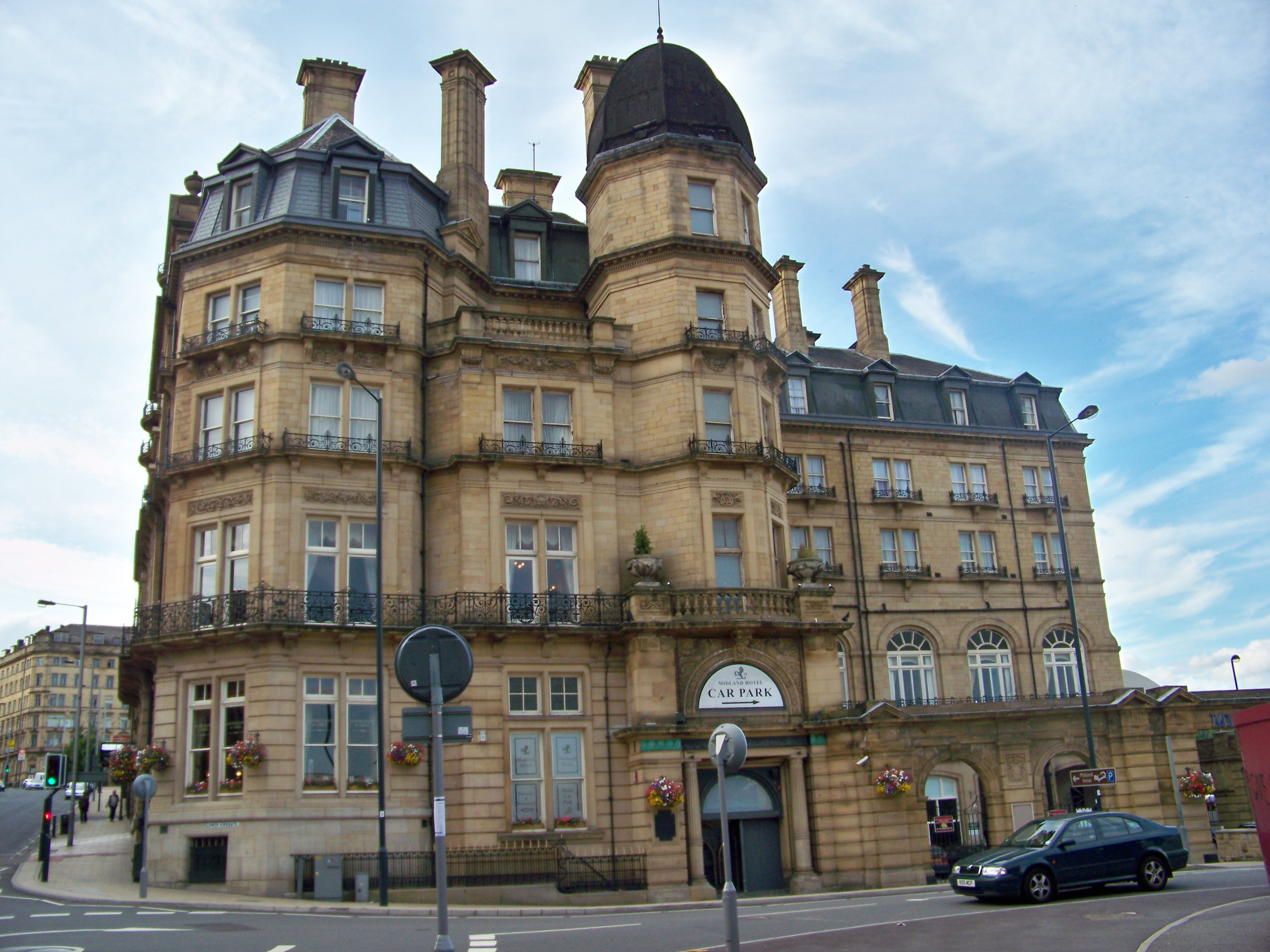
The Midland Hotel, Bradford, whence the trophy was stolen in November 1970. It was not rediscovered for another 20 years.

The stolen trophy was not the one which was due to be competed for and presented in the 1970 World Cup Final the following Saturday at Headingley, Leeds: with the commencement of sponsorship in the game, administrators had decided to play for a new sponsored trophy, with the original being kept safe and on display at the hotel in a symbolic capacity only.

Following its disappearance, nothing is known of the trophy's whereabouts for the next twenty years until, in 1990, Bradford resident Stephen Uttley and his wife Elizabeth discovered the trophy, missing only the plinth, amongst rubbish dumped in a ditch near the Bradford and Bingley Rugby Club in Bingley.

Unaware of the significance of his find, Stephen Uttley made enquiries with local rugby clubs including Bradford Northern (known today as the Bradford Bulls), but he was unable to find the original owners.

He subsequently handed the trophy in to the police, but it was returned to him 28 days later after no-one claimed it, and tried contacting Yorkshire Television's Calendar programme but could not interest them in the story.

Uttley consequently decided to donate it to a friend, Terry Fawthrop, who was the proprietor of the White Rose Health Club at Idle, Bradford, the same club frequented by Warrington and Kiwi International Gary Mercer during his stay in Bradford. There were plans for the trophy to be used as a bodybuilding trophy by the club. Mercer eventually contacted the local Telegraph & Argus newspaper, who ran an article on it. The trophy was identified by rugby league historian Trevor Delaney, who in turn notified the police, the newspapers and the Rugby Football League.

On 1 June 1990, the trophy was presented to Roger Millward of the RFL outside the White Rose health club in Bradford, before being taken to the RFL's headquarters in Leeds. Speaking on its return, RFL spokesman David Howes commented, "It is like the return of the Holy Grail. No-one knows what its value is, but in rugby league terms it is priceless". The RFL agreed to pay a reward for the trophy's return, "anything except a place in the team" Howes joked, but the finder asked only for some match tickets.

The original World Cup trophy was later brought back into use for the 2000 World Cup, minus the cockerel that had adorned it initially, and was presented to the victorious Australian team.

The trophy featured again during the 2008 World Cup, when it was used prominently as the basis for the competition logo, and retained for 2013 and beyond, being named after Paul Barrière beginning from the 2017 World Cup.

== See also ==
- Webb Ellis Cup
