= Bill Fallowfield =

Professional RL coach & administrator

Personal information
- Full name: William Fallowfield
- Born: 20 July 1914; England
- Died: 12 November 1985 (aged 71)

Coaching information
Representative
| Years | Team | Gms | W | D | L | W% |
| 1956–57 | Great Britain | 9 | 6 | 1 | 2 | 67 |
| 1960 | Great Britain | 3 | 3 | 0 | 0 | 100 |
- As of 11 March 2021

William Fallowfield OBE (20 July 1914 – 12 November 1985) was a British rugby league football coach and administrator of the mid-20th century.

Fallowfield was educated at Barrow Grammar School and attended St Catharine's College at the University of Cambridge. After graduating, he joined the Royal Air Force, where he served as a Flight Lieutenant during the Second World War.

He played rugby union for Northampton, and played twice in wartime international matches for England in 1942.

In 1946, he was appointed as secretary of the International Rugby League Board, a role which he served in until the 1970s.

In 1961, Fallowfield was recognised with an OBE in the 1961 Birthday Honours.

In 1967 Fallowfield devised the limited tackle rule to help improve the flow and speed of rugby league.
