= Festival of World Cups =

Collection of rugby league world cups

The Festival of World Cups is a collection of rugby league world cups usually held as a support series alongside the centrepiece Men's, Women's, and Wheelchair tournaments.

First held in 2008, as part of the Centenary of Rugby League in Australia celebrations, the festival has been a part of every Men's Rugby League World Cup since.

The 2008 festival included the following events:

- Defence Forces World Cup (1st)
- Police World Cup (1st)
- University World Cup (7th)
- Wheelchair Rugby League World Cup (1st)
- Women's Rugby League World Cup (3rd)

The same events also took place in 2013, but due to concerns over funding in 2017 the Police World Cup was cancelled and the wheelchair tournament was relocated to France. In 2017, the women's event was removed from the proceedings and upgraded to a centrepiece event, along with the wheelchair event in 2021.

The 2021 festival was anticipated to expand to include the following events:

- Masters Rugby League World Cup
- Men's and Women's Armed Forces World Cup
- Men's and Women's Student World Cup
- Men's Emerging Nations World Championship
- Women's Emerging Nations World Championship
- Men's Police World Cup
- PDRL World Cup

However, in August 2020, the festival was postponed and when the World Cup was rescheduled for 2022 only the Masters and PDRL events took place.

A list of festivals are as follows:

- 2008 Festival of World Cups
- 2013 Festival of World Cups
- 2017 Festival of World Cups
- 2021 Festival of World Cups
- 2026 Festival of World Cups
