= Tertiary Student Rugby League World Cup =

Sporting competition

University Rugby League World Cup
- Sport: Rugby league
- Instituted: 1986
- Number of teams: 6
- Region: International (RLIF)
- Holders: Australia (2017)
- Most titles: Australia (6 Titles)

The Tertiary Student Rugby League World Cup, also known as the University Rugby League World Cup, first took place in 1986 in New Zealand, when the then five test nations each entered a side in what was the first non-first grade World Cup hosted by the Rugby League International Federation.

The value of the Tertiary level to Rugby League in terms of spreading the sport, particularly in countries like Great Britain, France and New Zealand, led to a World Cup being created as an incentive to help grow this level of the game.

Since 1986, five more tournaments have been held, and sixteen nations have taken part. The tournament has been followed by the establishment of tertiary rugby league competitions in England, Wales, France, New Zealand, and Australia, as well as new competitions in other regions.

Although the 2008 tournament was not the largest, it provided a platform for players and nations to compete at the tertiary level.

== History ==
The league was established in 1967.

== Nations that have played in the Tertiary Student RLWC ==
Nation	Number of appearances	First appearance	Most recent appearance	Best result
Australia	9	1986	2017	Champions, 1989; 1992; 1996; 2008; 2013; 2017;
New Zealand	8	1986	2013	Champions, 1986; 1999; 2005;
France	7	1986	2008	3rd place, 1986; 1989; 2005;
England	8	1989	2017	Runners-up 1989; 2008; 2013; 2017;
Wales	8	1989	2017	4th place, 1992; 2013 Plate Winners 1996;
Scotland	8	1989	2017	5th place, 1992; Plate Winners 1999;
Ireland	8	1989	2017	6th place, 1989; 1996; 1999;
Samoa	2	1992	1996	Runners-up 1996;
Papua New Guinea	2	1986	1992	5th place, 1986;
Russia	3	1996	2013	Bowl Winners 1999
South Africa	3	1996	2013	8th place, 1999; 2013;
United States	2	1996	1999	7th place, 1996;
Japan	2	1996	1999	8th place, 1996;
Tonga	1	1992	1992	Runners-up 1992;
Greece	1	2008	2008	Plate winners 2008;
Great Britain	1	1986	1986	4th place, 1986;
Netherlands	1	1989	1989	8th place, 1989;
Pacific Islanders	2	2005	2017	Runners-up, 2017;
Fiji	1	1992	1992	7th place, 1992;
Canada	1	1999	1999	10th place, 1999;

== Tournaments ==
=== 1986 ===
New Zealand hosted the first World Cup. It focussed on the dominant rugby league playing nations of the time: Australia; New Zealand; Papua New Guinea; France and Great Britain.

GROUP GAMES:

Rnd 1	France Students	14–8	(United Kingdom) Great Britain Students
Rnd 1	New Zealand Universities	22–14	(Australia) Australian Universities
Rnd 2	New Zealand Universities	12–10	France Students
Rnd 2	(United Kingdom) Great Britain Students	40–8	Papua New Guinea Students
Rnd 3	(Australia) Australian Universities	12–4	(United Kingdom) Great Britain Students
Rnd 3	France Students	20–4	Papua New Guinea Students
Rnd 4	New Zealand Universities	54–0	Papua New Guinea Students
Rnd 4	(Australia) Australian Universities	35–18	France Students
Rnd 5	(Australia) Australian Universities	50–16	Papua New Guinea Students
Rnd 5	New Zealand Universities	28–12	(United Kingdom) Great Britain Students

Team	P	W	D	L	+	-	Diff	Pts
New Zealand	4	4	0	0	116	36	80	8
Australia	4	3	0	1	111	60	51	6
France	4	2	0	2	62	59	3	4
Great Britain	4	1	0	3	66	62	4	2
Papua New Guinea	4	0	0	4	28	164	-136	0

CUP THIRD V FOURTH FINAL:

France Students	24–10	(United Kingdom) Great Britain Students

CUP FINAL:

New Zealand Universities	14–10	(Australia) Australian Universities

WORLD CUP RANKINGS:

1. New Zealand
2. Australia
3. France
4. Great Britain
5. Papua New Guinea

=== 1989 ===
World Cup 2 came to these shores in 1989. Great Britain were now split into the Home Nations, with England applying themselves most successfully to lose narrowly to Australia in the Final. This World Cup also witnessed the first appearance of Holland on the world rugby league stage.

GROUP GAMES:
Rnd 1 - Ireland Students 16 defeated Scotland Students 12
Rnd 1 - Australian Universities 18 defeated England Students 10
Rnd 1 - New Zealand Universities 20 drew with France Students 20
Rnd 1 - Wales Students 48 defeated Holland Students 10

Rnd 2 - Australian Universities 36 defeated Scotland Students 22
Rnd 2 - England Students 65 defeated Ireland Students 12
Rnd 2 - New Zealand Universities 28 defeated Wales Students 10
Rnd 2 - France Students 42 defeated Holland Students 12

Rnd 3 - Australian Universities 78 defeated New Zealand Universities 8
Rnd 3 - England Students 54 defeated Scotland Students 4
Rnd 3 - New Zealand Universities 50 defeated Holland Students 16
Rnd 3 - France Students 18 defeated Wales Students 4

CUP SEMI FINALS:
England Students 20 defeated New Zealand Universities 10
Australian Universities 18 defeated France 2

CUP SEVENTH V EIGHTH FINAL:
Scotland Students 20 defeated Holland Students 10

CUP FIFTH V SIXTH FINAL:
Wales Students 48 defeated Ireland Students 12

CUP THIRD V FOURTH FINAL:
France Students 28 defeated New Zealand Universities 16

CUP FINAL:
Australian Universities 10 defeated England Students 5

WORLD CUP RANKINGS:
1. Australia
2. England
3. France
4. New Zealand
5. Wales
6. Ireland
7. Scotland
8. Holland

=== 1992 ===
The 1992 World Cup moved to Australia, and in addition to the continuing strength of the Australian student game, also saw the rise of the Pacific Islanders. Their senior teams were to make a big impression in the Halifax Centenary World Cup in 1995, but in 1992, Fiji, Samoa and in particular, Tonga, proved to be an instant hit.

GROUP GAMES:
Rnd 1 - England Students 38 defeated Ireland Students 4
Rnd 1 - Wales Students 20 defeated Fiji Students 18
Rnd 1 - Scotland Students 42 defeated Papua New Guinea Students 14
Rnd 1 - Australian Universities 32 defeated Tonga Students 6
Rnd 1 - New Zealand Universities 15 defeated Samoa Students 14

Rnd 2 - Tonga Students 36 defeated Papua New Guinea Students 12
Rnd 2 - New Zealand Universities 48 defeated Ireland Students 4
Rnd 2 - Fiji Students 34 defeated England Students 14
Rnd 2 - Australian Universities 38 defeated Scotland Students 10
Rnd 2 - Wales Students 7 defeated Samoa Students 6

Rnd 3 - Australian Universities 32 defeated Papua New Guinea Students 0
Rnd 3 - Tonga Students 56 defeated Scotland Students 12
Rnd 3 - New Zealand Universities 38 defeated Fiji Students 20
Rnd 3 - Wales Students 38 defeated Ireland Students 10
Rnd 3 - Samoa Students 24 defeated England Students 22

CUP QUARTER FINALS:
Tonga Students 44 defeated England Students 20
New Zealand Universities 24 defeated Scotland Students 18
Wales Students 57 defeated Fiji Students 20
Australian Universities 74 defeated Samoa Students 14

CUP SEMI FINALS:
Tonga Students 34 defeated New Zealand Universities 16
Australian Universities 35 defeated Wales Students 7

CUP FINAL:
Australian Universities 32 defeated Tonga Students 0

WORLD CUP RANKINGS:
1. Australia
2. Tonga
3. New Zealand
4. Wales
5. Scotland
6. England
7. Fiji
8. Samoa
9. Papua New Guinea
10. Ireland

=== 1996 ===
The Halifax Student Rugby League 1996 World Cup in England again saw an increase in the number of teams taking part, but unfortunately for the home nations, still no home success. Japan entered the rugby league world stage for the first time, and the USA carried on the good work of their senior side in 1995, by not only participating, but beating the Irish. France proved to be the most successful of the European teams. Australian Rugby League sent to England a senior referee on tour for the first time selected from the Australian Referees Queensland State Associations (Mr Reg Banush) who referee a final between the best players selected from all the competing nations, to play in a game : Northern Hemisphere verses Southern Hemisphere. This game was played under the EU flag of nations to show support to the "good will of sport", this game was played with a very high quality of skill by the selected players from both sides

GROUP GAMES:
Rnd 1 - France Students 29 defeated England Students 2
Rnd 1 - Scotland Students 90 defeated Japan Students 4
Rnd 1 - Samoa Students 16 defeated New Zealand Universities 4
Rnd 1 - Russia Students 57 defeated South Africa Students 30
Rnd 1 - Australian Universities 50 defeated Wales Students 4
Rnd 1 - USA Students 22 defeated Ireland Students 20

Rnd 2 - Scotland Students 10 defeated England Students 4
Rnd 2 - France Students 76 defeated Japan Students 0
Rnd 2 - New Zealand Universities 62 defeated USA Students 10
Rnd 2 - Samoa Students 42 defeated Ireland Students 16
Rnd 2 - Australian Universities 68 defeated South Africa Students 12
Rnd 2 - Russian Students 12 defeated Wales Students 8

Rnd 3 - Samoa Students 82 defeated USA Students 6
Rnd 3 - France Students 36 defeated Scotland Students 2
Rnd 3 - New Zealand Universities 66 defeated Ireland Students 0
Rnd 3 - England Students 76 defeated Japan Students 18
Rnd 3 - Australian Universities 52 defeated Russia Students 5
Rnd 3 - South Africa Students 30 defeated Wales Students 28

PLATE SEMI FINALS:
Wales Students 42 defeated USA Students 18
Ireland Students 66 defeated Japan Students 10

PLATE PLAY OFF:
USA Students 54 defeated Japan Students 10

PLATE FINAL:
Wales Students 20 defeated Ireland Students 12

BOWL SEMI FINALS:
South Africa Students 44 defeated Scotland Students 16
England Students 32 defeated Russian Students 18

BOWL PLAY OFF:
Russian Students 26 defeated Scotland Students 20

BOWL FINAL:
South Africa Students 22 defeated England Students 20

CUP SEMI FINALS:
Samoa Students 28 defeated France Students 22
Australian Universities 26 defeated New Zealand Universities 6

CUP PLAY OFF:
New Zealand Universities 22 defeated France Students 20

CUP FINAL:
Australian Universities 38 defeated Samoa Students 16

WORLD CUP RANKINGS:
1. Australia
2. Samoa
3. New Zealand
4. France
5. South Africa
6. England
7. Russia
8. Scotland
9. Wales
10. Ireland
11. USA
12. Japan

=== 1999 ===
The Independent Student Rugby League World Cup 1999 was a two-week event. New Zealand won the tournament, which featured participation from multiple teams.

GROUP A GAMES:
3 Oct - Russian Students 50 defeated Japan Students 8
6 Oct - France Students 27 defeated Russian Students 10
9 Oct - France Students 62 defeated Japan Students 14

GROUP B GAMES:
3 Oct - Wales Students 72 defeated Canadian Students 12
6 Oct - New Zealand Universities 88 defeated Canadian Students 0
9 Oct - New Zealand Universities 46 defeated Wales Students 10

GROUP C GAMES:
3 Oct - Scotland Students 26 drew with South Africa Students 16
6 Oct - England Students 34 defeated South Africa Students 18
9 Oct - England Students 20 defeated Scotland Students 4

GROUP D GAMES:
3 Oct - Ireland Students 50 defeated USA Students 0
6 Oct - Australian Universities 74 defeated USA Students 2
9 Oct - Australian Universities 40 defeated Ireland Students 10

PLATE SEMI FINALS:
Scotland Students 70 defeated Japan Students 10
Canadian Students 16 defeated USA Students 12

PLATE PLAY OFF:
USA Students 46 defeated Japan Students 16

PLATE FINAL:
Scotland Students 26 defeated Canadian Students 16

BOWL SEMI FINALS:
Russian Students 22 defeated South Africa Students 10
Ireland Students 26 defeated Wales Students 16

BOWL PLAY OFF:
Wales Students 26 defeated South Africa Students 24

BOWL FINAL:
Russian Students 25 defeated Ireland Students 24

CUP SEMI FINALS:
England Students 10 defeated France Students 7
New Zealand Universities 25 defeated Australian Universities 14

CUP PLAY OFF:
Australian Universities 78 defeated France Students 0

CUP FINAL:
New Zealand Universities 46 defeated England Students 16

WORLD CUP RANKINGS:
1. New Zealand
2. England
3. Australia
4. France
5. Russia
6. Ireland
7. Wales
8. South Africa
9. Scotland
10. Canada
11. USA
12. Japan

=== 2005 ===
GROUP A GAMES:
2 July - Australian Universities 66 defeated Scotland Students 4
2 July - New Zealand Universities 46 defeated Wales Students 0
6 July - Australian Universities 32 defeated New Zealand Universities 14
6 July - Wales Students 31 defeated Scotland Students 16
10 July - Australian Universities 74 defeated Wales Students 6
10 July - New Zealand Universities 70 defeated Scotland Students 4

GROUP B GAMES:
4 July - England Students 35 defeated France Students 18
4 July - Pacific Islanders 48 defeated Ireland Students 46
6 July - England Students 26 defeated Ireland Students 4
6 July - France Students 28 defeated Pacific Islanders 6
10 July - England Students 30 defeated Pacific Islanders 24
10 July - France Students 82 defeated Ireland Students 18

SHIELD SEMI FINALS:
12 July - Wales Students 25 defeated Ireland Students 10
12 July - Pacific Islands 30 defeated Scotland Students 16

SHIELD THIRD V FOURTH FINAL:
15 July - Scotland Students 13 defeated Ireland Students 4

SHIELD FINAL:
15 July - Pacific Islands 74 defeated Wales Students 18

CUP SEMI FINALS:
13 July - Australian Universities 20 defeated France Students 0
13 July - New Zealand Universities 34 defeated England Students 8

CUP THIRD V FOURTH FINAL:
16 July - France Students 31 defeated England Students 12

CUP FINAL:
17 July - Australian Universities 8 lost to New Zealand Universities 17

WORLD CUP RANKINGS:
1. New Zealand
2. Australia
3. France
4. England
5. Pacific Islands
6. Wales
7. Scotland
8. Ireland

=== 2008 ===
Eight teams participated in the 2008 Tertiary Student Rugby League World Cup in Australia.
The tournament was won by Australia, who defeated England in the final. Greece won the plate competition.

Pool A	Pld	W	D	L	PF	PA	PD	Pts
Australia	3	3	0	0	136	0	136	6
England	3	2	0	1	54	44	10	4
Greece	3	1	0	2	34	76	-42	2
Scotland	3	0	0	3	0	104	-104	0

Pool B	Pld	W	D	L	PF	PA	PD	Pts
New Zealand	3	3	0	0	82	30	52	6
Wales	3	2	0	1	84	46	38	4
France	3	1	0	2	27	66	-39	2
Ireland	3	0	0	3	24	75	-51	0

Plate Semi Finals

15 July 2008

Greece Students	28–10	Ireland Students

15 July 2008

France Students	34–4	Scotland Students

Seventh Play Off

19 July 2008

Ireland Students	22–18	Scotland Students

Plate Final

19 July 2008

Greece Students	14–12	France Students

Cup Semi Finals

16 July 2008

Australia Students	26–10	Wales Students

16 July 2008

England Students	30–22	New Zealand Students

Third Play Off

19 July 2008

New Zealand Students	24–18	Wales Students

Cup Final

19 July

Australia Students	26–16	England Students

=== 2013 ===
Eight participating nations competed in the eighth Student Rugby League Cup, which was held in the Northern English cities of Bradford, Batley, Castleford, Dewsbury and Leeds in early July. It was also the first time that Russia sent a team to compete.

Group A Games Rnd 1: 4 July: New Zealand defeated Russia 122–0
Australia defeated Scotland 96–0

Group B Games, Rnd 1: 4 July: Wales defeated South Africa 30–10
England defeated Ireland 54–6

Group A Games, Rnd 2: 7 July: Scotland defeated Russia 46–4
Australia defeated New Zealand 34–16

Group B Games, Rnd 2: 7 July: South Africa defeated Ireland 42–24
England defeated Wales 46–12

Group A Games, Rnd 3: 10 July: New Zealand defeated Scotland 58–22
Australia defeated Russia 108–0

Group B Games, Rnd 3: 10 July: Wales defeated Ireland 56–4
England defeated South Africa 52–14

7th Play-off game: 12 July: Ireland defeated Russia 42–18

5th Play-off game: 12 July: South Africa defeated Scotland 64–10

Semi-finals: 12 July: Australia defeated Wales 42–10
12 July: England defeated New Zealand (in golden point extra time) 18–17

Final at the Headingley Ground, Leeds: 14 July: Australia defeated England 26–16

=== 2017 ===
Before the renamed Universities World Cup began in Western Sydney, New Zealand caused a surprise by withdrawing four months before the competition through not being able to afford the high fees imposed by the tournament organisers. This left Australia the only competing nation left that had competed in every World Cup, from when the original tournament was founded and hosted by New Zealand 31 years previously. To stop a bye from occurring between Australia and the four home nations, a Pacific Islands team made up of Australian students of Pacific Island origin, was finalized three weeks before the tournament began in early July at Ringrose Park, St Mary's Stadium, New Era Stadium, Windsor Sporting Complex and finals venue, Pepper Stadium in Penrith.

Rnd 1 7 July: Pacific Islands 48, Ireland 4
Rnd 1 7 July: Scotland 48, Wales 18
Rnd 1 7 July: Australia 54, England 10

Rnd 2 9 July: Scotland 38, Ireland 24
Rnd 2 9 July: England 22, Wales 4
Rnd 2 9 July: Australia 68, Pacific Islands 16

Rnd 3 12 July: England 30, Scotland 20
Rnd 3 12 July: Pacific Islands 40, Wales 12
Rnd 3 12 July: Australia 46, Ireland 8

5th Playoff Game

14 July: Wales 28, Ireland 16; Halftime: Wales 16–6

Semi Finals

14 July: Australia 46, England 18; Halftime: Australia 22–6
14 July: Pacific Islands 44, Scotland 12; Halftime: Pacific Islands 16–4

Final at Pepper Stadium, Penrith

16 July: Australia 30, Pacific Islands 12; Halftime: Pacific Islands 6–4

== Records ==
Biggest Win:
2013 New Zealand Students 122 defeated Russia Students 0
2013 Australia Students 108 defeated Russia Students 0
1996 Scotland Students 90 defeated Japan Students 4
1999 New Zealand Universities 88 defeated Canadian Students 0
1996 Samoa Students 82 defeated USA Students 6
1996 France Students 76 defeated Japan Students 0
1999 Australian Universities 74 defeated USA Students 2

Tournament Wins:
1986 New Zealand
1989 Australia
1992 Australia
1996 Australia
1999 New Zealand
2005 New Zealand
2008 Australia
2013 Australia
2017 Australia

== See also ==
- Rugby League International Federation
- RLIF World Rankings
- List of International Rugby League Teams
