= 2030 Rugby League World Cup =

Collection of world cups in rugby league

- Number of teams: 12 (men); 10 (women)
- Host country: United States

The 2030 Rugby League World Cup (RLWC2030) is a collection of world cups in the sport of rugby league.

Unlike the 2021 and 2026 editions, the 2030 World Cup will see the men's and women's tournaments played only, with a separate wheelchair world cup held in France. The tournament, organised by the Australian Rugby League Commission, will see an expansion on the number of teams from 2026 with 12 teams contesting the men's competition and 10 teams contesting the women's.

== Host selection ==
The International Rugby League (IRL) had initially planned to separate the three tournaments of the Rugby League World Cup with the women's tournament to be held in 2028, the wheelchair in 2029, and the men's in 2030. The United States had originally bid to host both the men's and wheelchair tournaments.

In December 2025, the IRL reversed this decision, opting to hold all three tournaments concurrently preserving the uniqueness of the tournament. Despite not having bid for the women's tournament, the United States were reported as favourites to host the 2030 World Cup with the IRL keen to capitalise on the National Rugby League's Rugby League Las Vegas venture.

On 9 November 2026, the United States were announced as tournament hosts geographically with the Australian Rugby League Commission organising the tournament. Las Vegas was cited as a reason for the decision in addition to the fact that 80% of Premier Sports subscriptions for the 2026 Rugby League World Cup were from the United States.

Kenya, New Zealand, Papua New Guinea and South Africa also bid for both men's and women's tournaments.

== Format and venues ==
The 2030 World Cup will follow a Magic Weekend style format for the group stages, in which each team will play three games, followed by semi-finals and finals both also at a single venue meaning five host cities will be picked for the men's and women's tournament. Hawaii and Utah have been mooted as early favourite due to having a high Pacific Island population.
