= List of official Rugby League organisations =

This is a list of organizations responsible for the governing of the sport of rugby league.

== International ==
- Rugby League International Federation

== Africa ==
- Morocco Rugby League
- Lebanese Rugby League Federation
- South Africa Rugby League

== Asia-Pacific ==
- Asia-Pacific Rugby League Confederation

=== Asia ===
- Japan Rugby League
- Singapore Rugby League
- Emirates Rugby League
- Pambansang Ragbi Liga Ng Pilipinas

=== Australia ===
- Australian Rugby League Commission
  - Australian Universities Rugby League
  - New South Wales Rugby League
    - Country Rugby League
    - NSW Tertiary Student Rugby League
  - Queensland Rugby League
  - NRL Tasmania
  - NRL Northern Territory
  - NRL South Australia
  - NRL Victoria
  - NRL Western Australia

=== New Zealand ===
- New Zealand Rugby League
  - Auckland Rugby League
  - Bay of Plenty Rugby League
  - Canterbury Rugby League
  - Manawatu Rugby League
  - Rugby League Hawkes Bay
  - Taranaki Rugby League
  - Waikato Rugby League
  - Wellington Rugby League
  - West Coast Rugby League

=== Pacific Islands ===
- Pacific Islands Rugby League Federation
- Papua New Guinea Rugby Football League
- Solomon Islands Rugby League Federation
- Fiji National Rugby League
- Tonga National Rugby League

== Atlantic ==
- Canada Rugby League
- USA Rugby League
  - West Coast American National Rugby League
- West Indies Rugby League Federation
  - Jamaica Rugby League Association

== Europe ==
- Rugby League European Federation

=== Britain and Ireland ===
- Rugby Football League
  - British Amateur Rugby League Association
  - Student Rugby League
- Rugby League Ireland
  - Irish Amateur Rugby League Association
- Scotland Rugby League
- Wales Rugby League

=== Continental Europe ===
- Belgium Rugby League
- Associació Catalana de Rugby Lliga
- Czech Rugby League Association
- Estonia Rugby League Federation (defunct)
- Fédération Française de Rugby à XIII
- Georgia Rugby League
- Rugby League Deutschland
- Greek Rugby League
- Federazione Italiana Rugby League
- Maltese Rugby League Association
- Netherlands Rugby League Bond
- Portuguese Rugby League Association
- Russian Rugby League Federation
- Serbian Rugby League

== South America ==
- Rugby League Argentina
