= Universities Rugby League Queensland =

Queensland university rugby league competition.

- Current season or competition: 2026 Universities Rugby League Queensland season
- Sport: Rugby league
- Instituted: 1970
- Inaugural season: 1989
- Number of teams: 4
- Premiers: University of Sunshine Coast Spartans (2026)
- Most titles: University of Queensland Eagles (8 titles)
- Related competition: Australian Universities Rugby League

The Universities Rugby League Queensland (URLQ) is an affiliated body of the Queensland Rugby League, established to promote the development of Rugby League within Universities, TAFE and other Tertiary Institutes within the state of Queensland, Australia.

== History ==
The URLQ competition had its first season in 1989. It currently consists of four university teams, featuring teams from Griffith University, Queensland University of Technology, University of Queensland and University of Sunshine Coast.

=== Current teams ===
Club Name	Tertiary Institute
Griffith Dragons	Griffith University (Nathan campus)
QUT Trouts	Queensland University of Technology
UQ Hounds	University of Queensland (St Lucia campus)
USC Spartans	University of Sunshine Coast

=== Former teams ===
Club Name	Tertiary Institute	Source
Griffith Gold Coast Panthers	Griffith University (Gold Coast campus)	
Griffith Logan Redbacks	Griffith University (Logan campus)	
Griffith Mavericks	Griffith University (Griffith College)	
UQ Gatton Bulls	University of Queensland (Gatton campus)	URLQ
USQ Ironbarks	University of Southern Queensland (Toowoomba campus)	URLQ
ACU Saints	Australian Catholic University	URLQ

=== Renamed Clubs ===
The following teams have changed their names over their life in the URLQ:

- Griffith Logan Redbacks (Formerly: Griffith Logan Steamrollers)
- UQ Hounds (Formerly: UQ Eagles)

== Premiership winners (1989–present) ==
History of URLQ seasons and the respective premiers.

Premiership results by season, showing grand final scores
Season	Premiers	Score	Runner-up	Minor Premiers	Wooden Spoon
1989	Kelvin Grove				
1990	Kelvin Grove				
1991	UQ Eagles				
1992	UQ Eagles				
1993	UQ Eagles				
1994	UQ Eagles				
1995	USQ Ironbarks				
1996	USQ Ironbarks				
1997	QUT Trouts				
1998	USQ Ironbarks				
1999	QUT Trouts				
2000	UQ Eagles				
2001	UQ Eagles				
2002	UQ Eagles				
2003	Griffith Dragons				
2004	UQ Eagles	14-0	ACU Saints		UQ Gatton Bulls
2005	Griffith Dragons				
2006	Griffith Dragons				
2007	Griffith Dragons	42–24	QUT Trouts	Griffith Dragons	UQ Gatton Bulls
2008	Griffith Dragons	28–24	UQ Hounds	UQ Hounds	QUT Trouts
2009	UQ Hounds	32–18	Griffith Dragons	Griffith Dragons	USQ Ironbarks
2010	QUT Trouts			QUT Trouts	UQ Hounds
2011					
2012	USQ Ironbarks	26–6	Griffith Dragons	QUT Trouts	Griffith Logan Steamrollers
2013	Griffith Logan Redbacks	24–20	UQ Hounds	Griffith Logan Redbacks	Griffith Dragons
2014	Griffith Logan Redbacks	18–12	QUT Trouts	Griffith Gold Coast Panthers	USQ Ironbarks
2015	Griffith Logan Redbacks	19–18	UQ Hounds	QUT Trouts	ACU Saints
2016	QUT Trouts	22–16	Griffith Dragons	UQ Hounds	Griffith Gold Coast Panthers
2017	UQ Hounds	24–4	Griffith Logan Redbacks	QUT Trouts	Griffith Gold Coast Panthers
2018	UQ Hounds	10–8	Griffith Dragons	Griffith Dragons	QUT Trouts
2019	Griffith Dragons	22–16	UQ Hounds	Griffith Dragons	ACU Saints
2020	Cancelled due to COVID-19 pandemic				
2021	UQ Hounds	24–10	Griffith Dragons	USC Spartans	QUT Trouts
2022	UQ Hounds	32–6	QUT Trouts	UQ Hounds	Griffith Dragons
2023	UQ Hounds	34–10	USC Spartans	USC Spartans	QUT Trouts
2024	UQ Hounds	40–6	USC Spartans	UQ Hounds	QUT Trouts
2025	USC Spartans	24–12	QUT Trouts	QUT Trouts	Griffith Dragons
2026	USC Spartans	32-22	Griffith Dragons	Griffith Dragons	QUT Trouts

=== Teams Performance ===
==== Premierships ====
	Team	Winners	Runners-up	Years won	Years runner-up
1	UQ Eagles	8	0	1991, 1992, 1993, 1994, 2000, 2001, 2002, 2004	–
2	UQ Hounds	7	4	2009, 2017, 2018, 2021, 2022, 2023, 2024	2008, 2013, 2015, 2019
3	Griffith Dragons	6	6	2003, 2005, 2006, 2007, 2008, 2019	2009, 2012, 2016, 2018, 2021, 2026
4	QUT Trouts	4	3	1997, 1999, 2010, 2016	2007, 2014, 2022
5	Griffith Logan Redbacks	3	1	2013, 2014, 2015	2017
5	USQ Ironbarks	3	0	1995, 1996, 1998	–
6	Kelvin Grove	2	0	1989, 1990	–
7	USC Spartans	2	2	2025, 2026	2023, 2024
8	ACU Saints	0	1	–	2004
8	UQ Gatton Bulls	0			
8	Griffith Mavericks	0			
8	Griffith Gold Coast Panthers	0			
8	Griffith Logan Steamrollers	0			

==== Wooden spoons ====
	Team	Wooden spoons	Years in last place
1	QUT Trouts	5	2008, 2018, 2023, 2024, 2026
2	Griffith Dragons	3	2013, 2022, 2025
3	UQ Gatton Bulls	2	2003, 2007
3	ACU Saints	2	2015, 2019
3	Griffith Gold Coast Panthers	2	2016, 2017
3	USQ Ironbarks	2	2009, 2014
4	Griffith Logan Steamrollers	1	2012
4	UQ Hounds	1	2010
5	Griffith Logan Redbacks	0	
5	Kelvin Grove	0	
5	USC Spartans	0	
5	Griffith Mavericks	0	
5	UQ Eagles	0	

== See also ==
- NSW Tertiary Student Rugby League
