= NSW Tertiary Student Rugby League =

New South Wales Tertiary Student Rugby League
- Current season or competition: 2018 New South Wales Tertiary Student Rugby League season
- Sport: Rugby league
- Instituted: 1970
- Number of teams: 4
- Premiers: Sydney University (2018)
- Most titles: Norwest Polecats (15 titles)
- Website: tertiaryleague.com.au
- Related competition: Australian Universities Rugby League

The NSW Tertiary Student Rugby League is an affiliated body of the New South Wales Rugby League, established to promote the development of Rugby League within Universities, TAFE and other Tertiary Institutes within the state of NSW.

Formed in late 1969, the NSW Tertiary Student Rugby League came about when the Sydney University, Macquarie University, University of NSW and University of Newcastle Rugby League clubs joined to create their own competition that was not restricted by the same boundaries as other senior open age competitions within Sydney.

In 2009 the NSW Tertiary Student Rugby League had 12 clubs from Sydney, Bathurst, Canberra and Newcastle, making it one of the most geographically spread competitions under the New South Wales Rugby League.

== History ==
=== Arnold Stehr Tertiary Nines ===
The Tertiary Nines was an annual pre-season competition run by the NSW Tertiary Student Rugby League to kick start the Tertiary League season.

Year	Premiers	Score	Runners-up
1973	Macquarie University		
1974	Macquarie University		
1975	Catholic College of Education		
1976	Catholic College of Education		
1977			
1978	Catholic College of Education		
1979	Macquarie University		
1980			
1981			
1982			
1983			
1984	Catholic College of Education		
No Competition Between 1985 and 2005
2006	University of Technology, Sydney		Bathurst Mungoes
2007	Sydney University		Bathurst Mungoes
2008	Sydney University		University of Technology, Sydney
2009	Lewisham Old Boys		Royal Australian Navy Titans
2010	West Sydney Blues		Norwest Polecats
2011	Lewisham Old Boys		Bathurst Mungoes
2012	Norwest Polecats		University of Technology, Sydney
2013	RailCorp Apprentices		University of Technology, Sydney
2015	University of Technology, Sydney		University of Western Sydney Ducks
2016	University of Technology, Sydney		University of Western Sydney Ducks
2018	Macquarie University	10 – 8	Sydney University
2019	UTS Leichhardt Wanderers	34 – 14	Sydney University

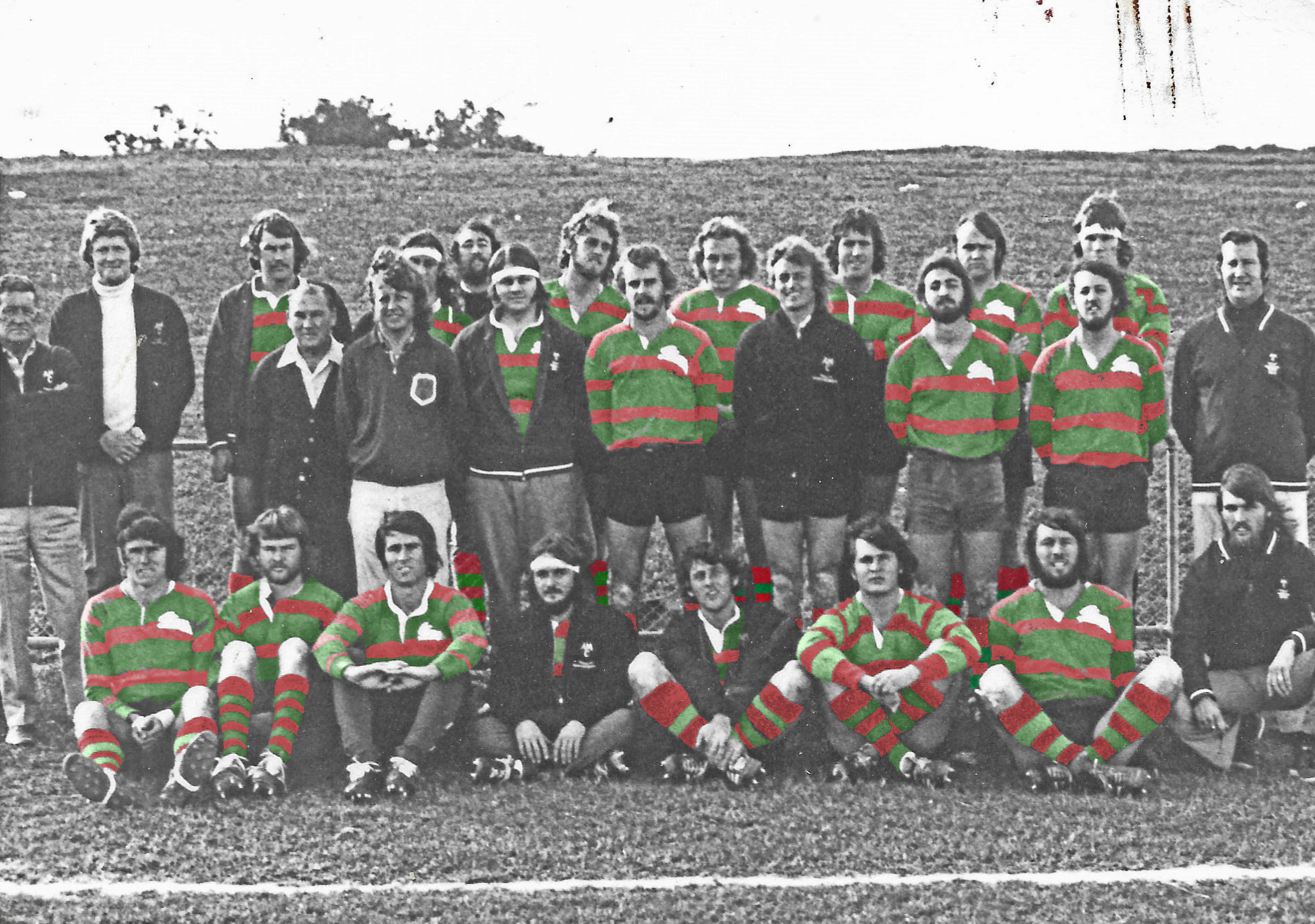
Alexander Mackie College Premiers 1974 Alexander Mackie College Premiers 1972 Alexander Mackie College Premiers 1971

=== Tertiary Championship: First Division ===
The original competition set up by the NSW Tertiary Student Rugby League back in 1970, the Tertiary League is the premier week-to-week competition run in NSW for University, TAFE and other Tertiary college students.

CSU Bathurst take on Cumberland College in the NSWTSRL First Division competition

Year	Premiers	Score	Runner-up
1970	Sydney University		
1971	Alexander Mackie College	19-9	Westmead Teachers College
1972	Alexander Mackie College	21-8	Macquarie University
1973	Alexander Mackie College	21-14	Catholic College of Education
1974	Alexander Mackie College	19-12	Catholic College of Education
1975	Catholic College of Education		Sydney University
1976	Catholic College of Education		
1977	Teachers Club		
1978	Sydney University		
1979	Nepean CAE, Kingswood		
1980	Mount Saint Mary		
1981	Mount Saint Mary		
1982	Nepean CAE, Kingswood		
1983	Catholic College of Education		Macquarie University
1984	Macquarie University	17 – 14	Catholic College of Education
1985	Catholic College of Education		Wollongong University
1986	Wollongong University		Macquarie University
1987	Catholic College of Education		Macquarie University
1988	Macquarie University	4 – 0	Catholic College of Education
1989	Catholic College of Education		Hornsby Technical College
1990	University of NSW	38 – 16	Catholic College of Education
1991	University of NSW		Catholic College of Education
1992	ACU Castle Hill		Cumberland College
1993	ACU Castle Hill		
1994	ACU Castle Hill		University of NSW
1995	University of Technology, Sydney		ACU Castle Hill
1996	ACU Castle Hill		Cumberland College
1997	University of Technology, Sydney		ACU Castle Hill
1998	Cumberland College		Macquarie University
1999	ACU Castle Hill		University of Canberra
2000	Sydney University		ACU Castle Hill
2001	University of Technology, Sydney		UWS Nirimba
2002	Sydney University		UWS Nirimba
2003	UWS Nirimba	32 – 10	UTS Jets
2004	UTS Jets		UWS Nirimba
2005	UWS Nirimba		UWS Macarthur
2006	UTS Jets	48 – 4	UWS Macarthur
2007	UTS Jets	40 – 30	UWS Nirimba
2008	Norwest Polecats	14 – 12	West Sydney Blues
2009	UTS Tigers	24 – 22	Lewisham Old Boys
2010	West Sydney Blues	19 – 18	Norwest Polecats
2011	Lewisham Old Boys	22 – 20	Norwest Polecats
2012	Norwest Polecats	20 – 16	UTS Tigers
2013	RailCorp Apprentices	22 – 16	UTS Tigers
2014	UTS Tigers	28 – 18	Sydney University
2015	Norwest Polecats	20 – 16	UTS Tigers
2016	UTS Tigers	24 – 16	TAFE Western Sydney Polecats
2017	TAFE NSW Polecats	24 – 16	UTS Tigers
2018	Sydney University	18 – 12	UTS Tigers
2019	TAFE NSW Polecats	26 – 8	UTS Leichhardt Wanderers
2020	UTS Leichhardt Wanderers	46 – 18	TAFE NSW Polecats

=== Bill Buckley Memorial Trophy: Second Division ===
With a significant influx of teams joining the NSW Tertiary Student Rugby League after the competition was originally created, it was deemed that in 1973 a Second Division competition would be created. The competition has been run every year since.

Nirimba make a hit up against Macquarie in the 2006 Second Division Grand Final at Leichhardt Oval

Year	Premiers	Score	Runner-up
1973	NSW Institute of Technology		
1974	Sydney University		
1975	Sydney University		
1976	Sydney University Vet Science		
1977	Sydney University		
1978	Sydney University		
1979	Kuring-gai CAE		
1980	Macquarie University		
1981	Catholic College of Education		
1982	State Rail Authority		Catholic College of Education
1983	NSW Institute of Technology		
1984	State Rail Authority		
1985	North Sydney Technical College		
1986	Macquarie University		
1987	State Rail		
1988	Macquarie University	21 – 8	Catholic College of Education
1989	Catholic College of Education		University of NSW
1990	Macquarie University	18 – 14	Catholic College of Education
1991	Cumberland College		
1992	Newcastle University Seahorses		
1993	University of NSW		ACU Castle Hill
1994	ACU Castle Hill		Mitchell Old Boys
1995	Sydney University		
1996	ACU Castle Hill	23 – 20	University of Technology, Sydney
1997	ACU Castle Hill		
1998	Bathurst Mungoes		
1999	University of Technology, Sydney		ACU Castle Hill
2000	University of NSW		
2001	Macquarie University		
2002	UWS Macarthur		
2003	Macquarie University		
2004	Cumberland College		
2005	UWS Macarthur		
2006	Macquarie University	24 – 14	UWS Nirimba
2007	Sydney University		University of Technology, Sydney
2008	Newcastle University Seahorses	22 – 8	Bathurst Mungoes
2009	Bathurst Mungoes	34 – 28	UTS Tigers
2010	Cumberland Beavers	36 – 0	Bathurst Mungoes
2011	UTS Tigers	28 – 18	ANU Grizzlies
2012	UTS Tigers	24 – 18	Norwest Polecats
2013	Cumberland Beavers	40 – 6	RailCorp Apprentices
2014	UWS Ducks	36 – 10	Sydney University
2015	Cumberland Beavers	26 – 22	UTS Tigers
2016	UC Grizzlies	38 – 14	TAFE Western Sydney Polecats
2017	UTS Tigers	28 – 22	TAFE NSW Polecats
2018	* Macquarie University	26 – 16	TAFE NSW Polecats
2020	* Sydney University	46 – 28	Western Sydney University Ducks

* Bill Buckley Memorial Trophy 3rd v 4th Play-off match

=== John Pollard Trophy: Third Division ===
The NSW Tertiary Student Rugby League operated a Third Division competition from 1981 to 2004. Originally the Third Division was operated as a completely separate competition from First and Second Division, however after the Super League war when a number of Tertiary institutes stopped playing Rugby League, the Third Division was made up of teams who failed to make the Second Division finals.

Year	Premiers	Score	Runner-up
1978	Nepean CAE, Kingswood		North Sydney Catholics
1979			
1980			
1981	Macquarie University		
1982			
1983			
1984	Catholic College of Education	16 – 11	Royal Australian Air Force
1986	Catholic College of Education		Macquarie University
1987	Nepean C.A.E		Catholic College of Education
1988	Catholic College of Education		State Rail Authority
1989	Sydney University	18 – 4	Catholic College of Education
1990	Catholic College of Education	32 – 0	State Rail Authority
1994	Cumberland College		
1996	State Rail Authority		
1997	Macquarie University		University of Technology, Sydney
1999	Sydney University		
2000	State Rail Authority		ACU Castle Hill
2001	UWS Nirimba		
2002	UWS Nirimba		
2003	University of Technology, Sydney		
2004	UWS Macarthur		

== NSW Tertiary Representative Matches ==
The Annual City v Country clash gives a chance for some of the best players from the NSW Tertiary Student League competition to battle it out for the City/Country Shield.

Year	Winner	Score	Runner-up
2012	Country	24 – 22	City
2014	City	34 – 22	Country
2016	Country	22 – 22	City
2017	City	32 – 18	Country
2018	East Metro	18 – 14	West Metro
2019	Metro West	38 – 22	Metro East

== Clubs ==
Twelve clubs from Sydney, Bathurst, Canberra Newcastle have confirmed their participation in the 2009 New South Wales Tertiary League season.

Club Name	Tertiary Institute	Year formed
Australia Catholic University	Australia Catholic University	2015
Cumberland Beavers	University of Western Sydney, Nepean / Parramatta TAFE	1991
Macquarie University Warriors	Macquarie University	
TAFE NSW Polecats	TAFE NSW	1971
Sydney University Lions	University of Sydney, Camperdown	1920
University of Canberra Grizzlies	University of Canberra	2009
UTS Tigers	University of Technology, Sydney	1970
UWS Ducks	University of Western Sydney	2014

=== Renamed Clubs ===
The following teams have changed their names over their life in the NSW Tertiary Student Rugby League:

- Cumberland Beavers (Formerly: Cumberland College)
- Macquarie Warriors (Formerly: Macquarie Treefrogs)
- TAFE NSW Polecats (Formerly: Catholic College of Education, Polding College Polecats, ACU Castle Hill Polecats, UWS Nirimba Polecats, Norwest Polecats, WSI TAFE Polecats)
- University of Canberra Cows (Formerly: Canberra Skolars, now play in the Canberra Raiders Cup)
- UTS Tigers (Formerly: UTS Bulls, UTS Jets)
- Railcorp Apprentices (Formally Public Transport Commission Apprentice College, State Rail Apprentice College).

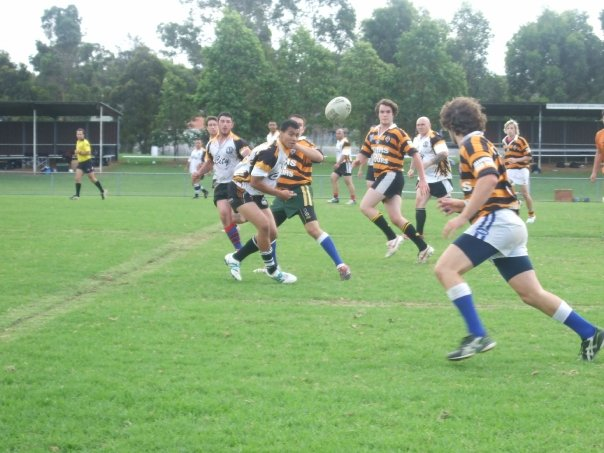
UTS Tigers

=== Former clubs ===
The following Tertiary Institutes participated in one of the NSW Tertiary Student Rugby League competitions in the past:

- Alexander Mackie Teachers' College
- Australian Defence Force Academy
- Hornsby TAFE (Also known as: Hornsby Technical College)
- Macquarie University
- Mount Saint Mary College
- North Sydney TAFE (Also known as: North Sydney Technical College)
- NSW Institute of Technology
- Sydney University Vet Science (Merged with Sydney University)
- Teachers Club
- University of New South Wales (Now play in the South Sydney District League)
- University of Technology, Kuring-gai (Also known as: Kuring-gai CAE)
- University of Western Sydney, Nepean (Also known as: Nepean CAE, Kingswood)
- Wollongong University (Now play in the Illawarra District League)

== See also ==
- Universities Rugby League Queensland

== Tertiary League Governing Bodies ==
- NSW Tertiary Student Rugby League Official Site
- Universities Rugby League Queensland Official Site
- Australian Universities Rugby League Official Site
- 2008 Tertiary Student Rugby League World Cup
