= Australian Universities Rugby League =

The Australian Universities Rugby League is the body responsible for the development and growth of Rugby League throughout the tertiary level of education within Australia.

It selects the Australian team to compete in University World Cups.

Its members are the New South Wales Tertiary Student Rugby League and the Universities Rugby League Queensland who run the state competitions in their respective states.

== New South Wales Tertiary Students Rugby League ==
The TSRL runs a nine team competition between New South Wales and Canberra Universities.

University	Nickname
Australian Defence Force Academy	Knights
Australian National University	Grizzlies
University of Canberra	Cows
University of Western Sydney (Nepean campus)	Cumberland Beavers
University of Western Sydney (Macarthur campus)	Panthers
Newcastle University	Seahorses
University of Western Sydney (Nirimba campus)	Polecats
Railcorp Apprentices	n/a
University of Technology Sydney	Tigers

== Universities Rugby League Queensland ==
The URLQ runs a six team competition featuring the following universities.

University	Nickname
Griffith University (Brisbane campus)	Dragons
Griffith University (Gold Coast campus)	Panthers
Griffith University (Logan campus)	Steamrollers
Queensland University of Technology	Trouts
University of Queensland (Gatton campus)	Bulls
University of Queensland (St Lucia campus)	Hounds
University of Southern Queensland	Ironbarks
