= Rugby league =

Full-contact sport played by two teams of thirteen players on a rectangular field

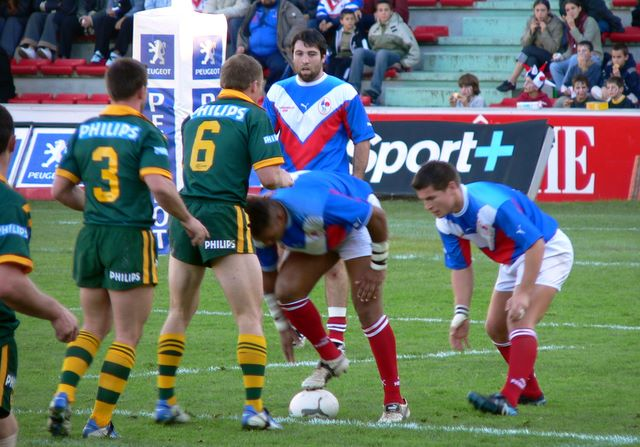
- An attacking player playing the ball
- Highest governing body: International Rugby League
- Nicknames: League (New Zealand and the Australian states of New South Wales, Queensland), Footy (New South Wales and Queensland); Rugby (Northern England and Papua New Guinea); Rugby XIII (Non-Anglophone Europe)
- First played: 7 September 1895, Yorkshire, Northern England (post schism)

Characteristics
- Contact: Full
- Team members: 13
- Mixed-sex: Single
- Type: Team sport, outdoor
- Equipment: Rugby league ball
- Venue: Rugby league playing field

Presence
- Country or region: Worldwide (most popular in Oceania, northern England and southern France)

Rugby league football, commonly known as rugby league, is a full-contact sport played by two teams of thirteen players on a rectangular field measuring 68 m (74 yd) wide and 112–122 m (122–133 yd) long with H-shaped posts at both ends. It is one of the two major codes of rugby football, the other being rugby union. (Note: American football and Canadian football are both broadly speaking evolutions from the rugby codes - the Canadian Football League in particular evolved specifically from the Canadian Rugby Union (not to be confused with Rugby Canada which governs rugby union in Canada), and maintained rugby in its name as late as 1967 when the organisation changed its name, and the name of its sport, definitively. However, the forward pass rules in both sports now differentiate the gridiron games to such an extent as not to be considered 'rugby codes' except in a broader sense. Other hand in ball games, including private school sports such as the Eton Wall Game are not usually referred to as rugby, which is considered specific to games evolved from the game played at the private Rugby School.)

It originated in 1895 in Huddersfield, West Yorkshire, and England, as the result of a split from the Rugby Football Union (RFU) over the issue of payments to players. The rules of the game governed by the new Northern Rugby Football Union progressively changed from those of the RFU with the specific aim of producing a faster and more entertaining game to appeal to paying spectators, on whose income the new organisation and its members depended.

In rugby league, points are scored by carrying an oval ball and touching it to the ground beyond the opposing team's goal line; this is called a try, and is the primary method of scoring, worth four points. The opposing team attempts to stop the attacking side scoring points by tackling the player carrying the ball and denying forward progress. On occasion, where a clear try scoring opportunity has been thwarted by foul play, a penalty try may be awarded without the ball being grounded over the try line. In addition to tries, points can be scored by kicking goals. Drop goals (or field goals) can be attempted from the hand at any time for a single point. Following a successful try, the scoring team gains a free kick to try at goal with a conversion worth a further two points. Penalty kicks at goal, known simply as penalties, may also be awarded for general foul play, and are also worth two points. Unlike drop goals, penalty kicks and conversions are taken from the ground, with the ball usually set in a kicking tee, and the opposing team not allowed to directly challenge the kicker.

The National Rugby League (NRL) in Australia/New Zealand and the Super League in Europe are the world's premier club competitions. Rugby league is played internationally, predominantly by Australasian, European, and Pacific Island countries, and is governed by the International Rugby League. Rugby league is the national sport of Papua New Guinea and the Cook Islands and is a popular sport in countries such as England, Australia, New Zealand, Tonga, Fiji and Samoa.

The first Rugby League World Cup was held in France in 1954, the first World Cup of either rugby code, and has been held sporadically ever since, settling into a four-yearly cycle in the 2010s; as of 2023, the holders are Australia.

The first Women's Rugby League World Cup was held in 2000 and New Zealand won the inaugural title. The holders are Australia.

A short-sided version of the sport, rugby league nines, using modified rugby league rules also exists, and is comparable to rugby sevens. Wheelchair rugby league is a mixed-gender sport using heavily modified rugby league rules for disabled and able-bodied players. Unlike wheelchair rugby which adopted its name after the invention of the sport previously called murderball and is not directly linked to rugby union, wheelchair rugby league has grown out of the parent sport, and retains key aspects of that sport such as an egg shaped ball, the forward-pass rule and conversions. While not a Paralympic sport, the sport has its own Wheelchair Rugby League World Cup. A further variation for ambulatory disabled players, physical disability rugby league, was created and had its first world cup in 2022 to coincide with the rescheduled 2021 Rugby League World Cup competitions.

== Etymology ==
Rugby league football takes its name from the bodies that split to create a new form of rugby, distinct from that run by the Rugby Football Unions, in Britain, Australia, and New Zealand between 1895 and 1908. Within the original meanings of the words, Unions were broad collective organisations with a somewhat greater emphasis on hierarchies beyond merely the clubs, whereas 'Leagues' were essentially formal collections of individual clubs participating on an equal basis in competitions they devised themselves (see also the use of 'Football Association' in association football, more commonly called 'football' or 'soccer', and compare to the 'Football League' competitions founded in that sport by its clubs).

The first of these, the Northern Rugby Football Union, was established in 1895 as a breakaway faction of England's Rugby Football Union (RFU). Both organisations played the game under the same rules at first, although the Northern Union began to modify rules almost immediately, thus creating a new simpler game that was intended to be a faster-paced form of rugby football. Similar breakaway factions split from RFU-affiliated unions in Australia and New Zealand in 1907 and 1908, renaming themselves "rugby football leagues" and introducing Northern Union rules. In 1922, the Northern Union also changed its name to the Rugby Football League and thus over time the sport itself became known as "rugby league" football.

== History ==
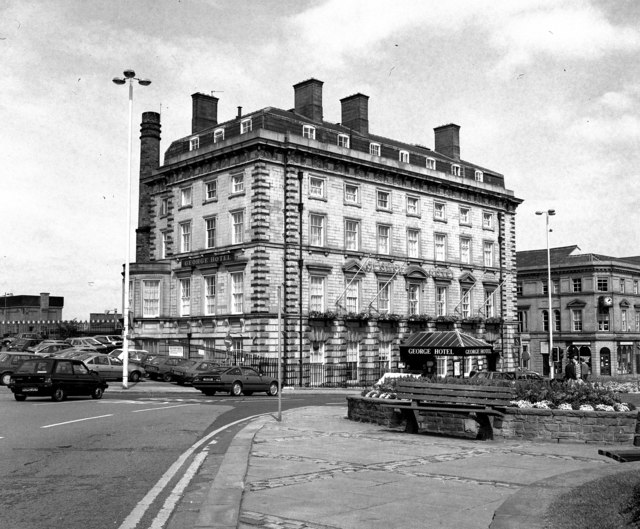
George Hotel, Huddersfield, the birthplace of rugby league

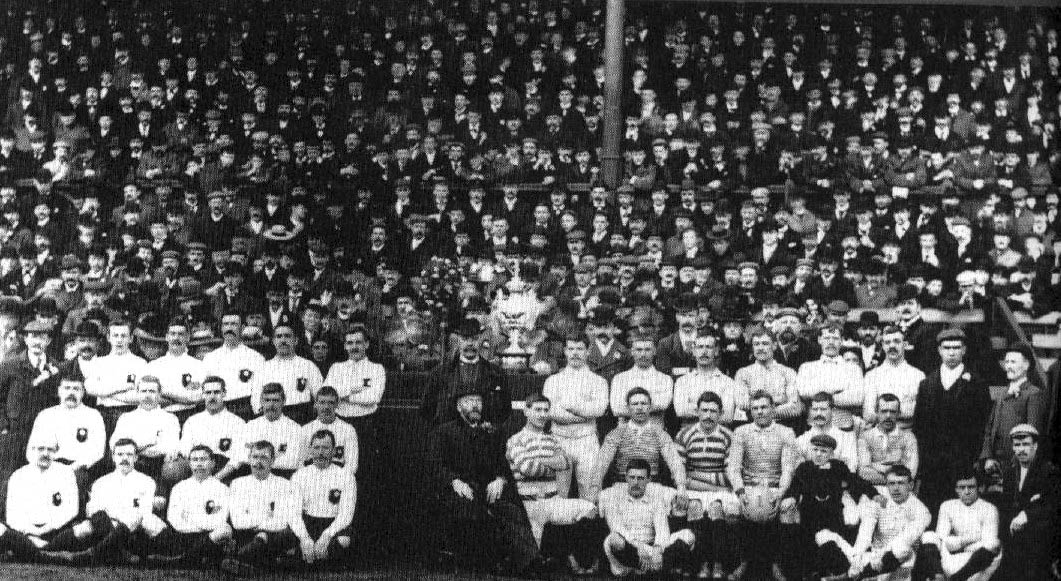
The first ever Challenge Cup Final, 1897: Batley (left) vs St Helens (right)

In 1895, a schism in Rugby football resulted in the formation of the Northern Rugby Football Union (NRFU). The success of working class northern teams led to some compensating players who otherwise would be on their job and earning income on Saturdays. This led to the RFU reacting to enforce the amateur principle of the sport, preventing "broken time payments" to players who had taken time off work to play rugby. Northern teams typically had more working class players (coal miners, mill workers etc.) who could not afford to play without this compensation, in contrast to affluent southern teams who had other sources of income to sustain the amateur principle. In 1895, a decree by the RFU banning the playing of rugby at grounds where entrance fees were charged led to twenty-two clubs (including Stockport, who negotiated by telephone) meeting at the George Hotel, Huddersfield, on 29 August 1895 and forming the "Northern Rugby Football Union". Within fifteen years of that first meeting in Huddersfield, more than 200 RFU clubs had left to join the rugby league.

In 1897, the line-out was abolished and in 1898 professionalism introduced. In 1906, the Northern Union changed its rules, reducing teams from 15 to 13 a side and replacing the ruck formed after tackles with the play-the-ball. By this point, rule changes meant the game organised by the RFL was distinct as a sport from its union cousin.

A similar schism to that which occurred in England took place in Sydney, Australia. There, on 8 August 1907 the New South Wales Rugby Football League was founded at Bateman's Hotel in George Street. Unlike in England, where both codes maintained their own geographic areas of dominance, in Australia rugby league went on to displace rugby union entirely as the primary football code in New South Wales and Queensland, while Australian rules football dominated the rest of Australia.

On 5 May 1954, 102,569 spectators watched the 1953–54 Challenge Cup Final replay at Odsal Stadium, Bradford, England, setting a new record for attendance at a rugby football match of either code. Also in 1954, the Rugby League World Cup, the first for either code of rugby, was formed at the instigation of the French. In 1966, the International Board introduced a rule that a team in possession was allowed three play-the-balls and on the fourth tackle a scrum was to be formed. This was increased to six tackles in 1972 and in 1983 the scrum was replaced by a handover. 1967 saw the first professional Sunday matches of rugby league played.

The first sponsors, Joshua Tetley and John Player, entered the game for the 1971–72 Northern Rugby Football League season. Television had an enormous impact on the sport of rugby league in the 1990s, when News Corporation paid for worldwide broadcasting rights. The media giant's "Super League" movement created changes for the traditional administrators of the game. In Europe, it resulted in a move from Rugby League being a winter sport to a summer one, as the new Super League competition tried to expand its market. In Australasia, the Super League war resulted in long and costly legal battles and changing loyalties, causing significant damage to the code in an extremely competitive sporting market. In 1997 two competitions were run alongside each other in Australia, after which a peace deal in the form of the National Rugby League was formed. The NRL has replaced the ARL as the sport's flagship competition and since that time has set record TV ratings and crowd figures.

== Rules ==
=== Laws of the game ===
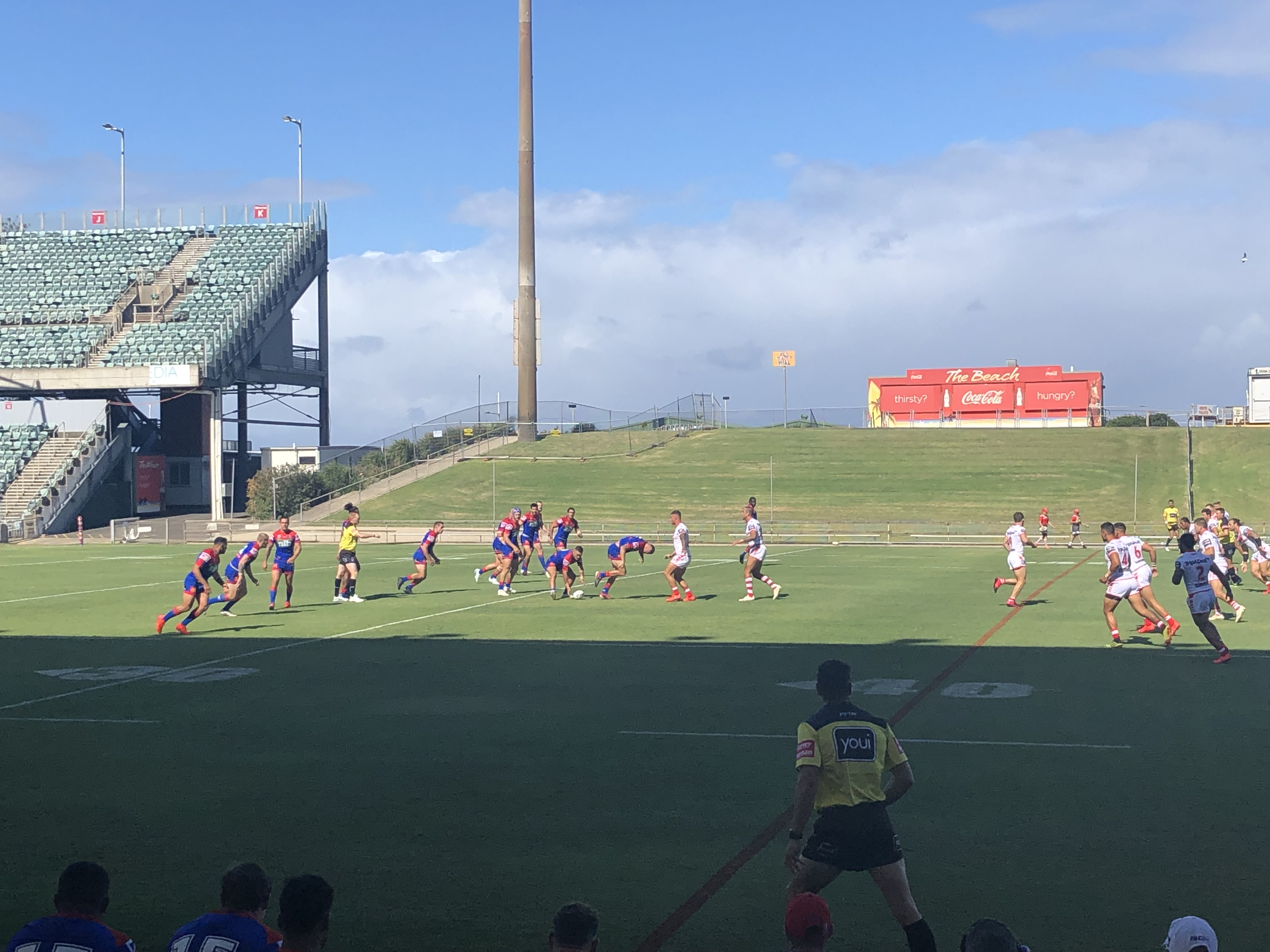
A typical game of rugby league being played

The objective in rugby league is to score more points through tries, goals and field goals (also known as drop goals) than the opposition within the 80 minutes of play. If after two-halves of play, each consisting of forty minutes, the two teams are drawing, a draw may be declared, or the game may enter extra time under the golden point rule, depending on the relevant competition's format.

The try is the most common form of scoring, and a team will usually attempt to score one by running and kicking the ball further upfield or passing from player-to-player in order to manoeuvre around the opposition's defence. A try involves touching the ball to the ground on or beyond the defending team's goal-line and is worth four points. A goal is worth two points and may be gained from a conversion or a penalty. A field goal, or drop goal, is only worth one point and is gained by dropping and then kicking the ball on the half volley between the uprights in open play. A field goal has a value of 2 points when kicked from beyond the 40 metre line (equivalent to about 43.75 yards).

Field position is crucial in rugby league, achieved by running with or kicking the ball. Passing in rugby league may only be in a backward or sideways direction. Teammates, therefore, have to remain on-side by not moving ahead of the player with the ball. The ball may be kicked ahead, but if teammates are in front of the kicker when the ball is kicked, they are deemed off-side.

Tackling is a key component of rugby league play. Only the player holding the ball may be tackled. A tackle is complete, for example, when the player is held by one or more opposing players in such a manner that they can make no further progress and cannot part with the ball, or when the player is held by one or more opposing players and the ball or the hand or arm holding the ball comes into contact with the ground. An attacking team gets a maximum of six tackles to progress up the field before possession is changed over. Once the tackle is completed, the ball-carrier must be allowed to get to their feet to 'play-the-ball'. Ball control is also important in rugby league, as a fumble of the ball on the ground forces a handover, unless the ball is fumbled backwards. The ball can also be turned over by going over the sideline.

=== Comparison with rugby union ===
Rugby league and rugby union are distinct sports with many similarities and a shared origin. Both have the same fundamental rules, are played for 80 minutes and feature an oval-shaped ball and H-shaped goalposts. Both have rules that the ball cannot be passed forward, and dropping it forwards leads to a scrum. Both use tries as the central scoring method and conversion kicks, penalty goals and drop goals as additional scoring methods. However, there are differences in how many points each method is worth.

One of the main differences is the rules of possession. When the ball goes into touch, possession in rugby union is contested through a line-out, while in rugby league a scrum restarts play. The lesser focus on contesting possession means that play focuses more on powerful running, hard tackling, forward progression and the contest for field position (commonly compared to an "arm wrestle"); as a result play stops much less frequently in rugby league, with the ball typically in play for 50 out of the 80 minutes compared to around 35 minutes for professional rugby union. Other differences include that there are fewer players in rugby league (13 compared to 15) and different rules for tackling. Rugby union has more detailed rules than rugby league and has changed less since the 1895 schism.

Since rugby union turned professional in the mid-1990s, it has increasingly borrowed techniques, tactics and even laws from rugby league, while high-profile players and coaches from the league game have increasingly gone on to success in the union code in those countries where both codes are popular (e.g. Andy Farrell, Jason Robinson and Henry Paul). The inherent similarities between rugby league and rugby union have at times led to experimental hybrid games being played that use a mix of the two sports' rules.

=== Comparison with gridiron codes ===
Much more so than rugby union, rugby league shares significant similarities with North American gridiron codes. Although described as evolving from both rugby and association football, the basic structures of American and Canadian football are remarkably similar to rugby league through a process of parallel evolution: a try-and-goal based scoring system, a set number of plays before handover of the football, each play restarting from a set piece position and ended by a tackle. Although the Canadian Football League in particular maintained the word 'rugby' in its name for many years, alluding to that shared past, the introduction of the forward pass and unlimited substitution in North American games created a fundamentally different species of game from either original rugby code. Although the historic link between the codes continues to be acknowledged, neither Canadian or American football is commonly considered a rugby code today except in the broadest sense, and are more commonly referred to collectively as gridiron codes, or simply as 'football' within their respective countries.

== Positions ==
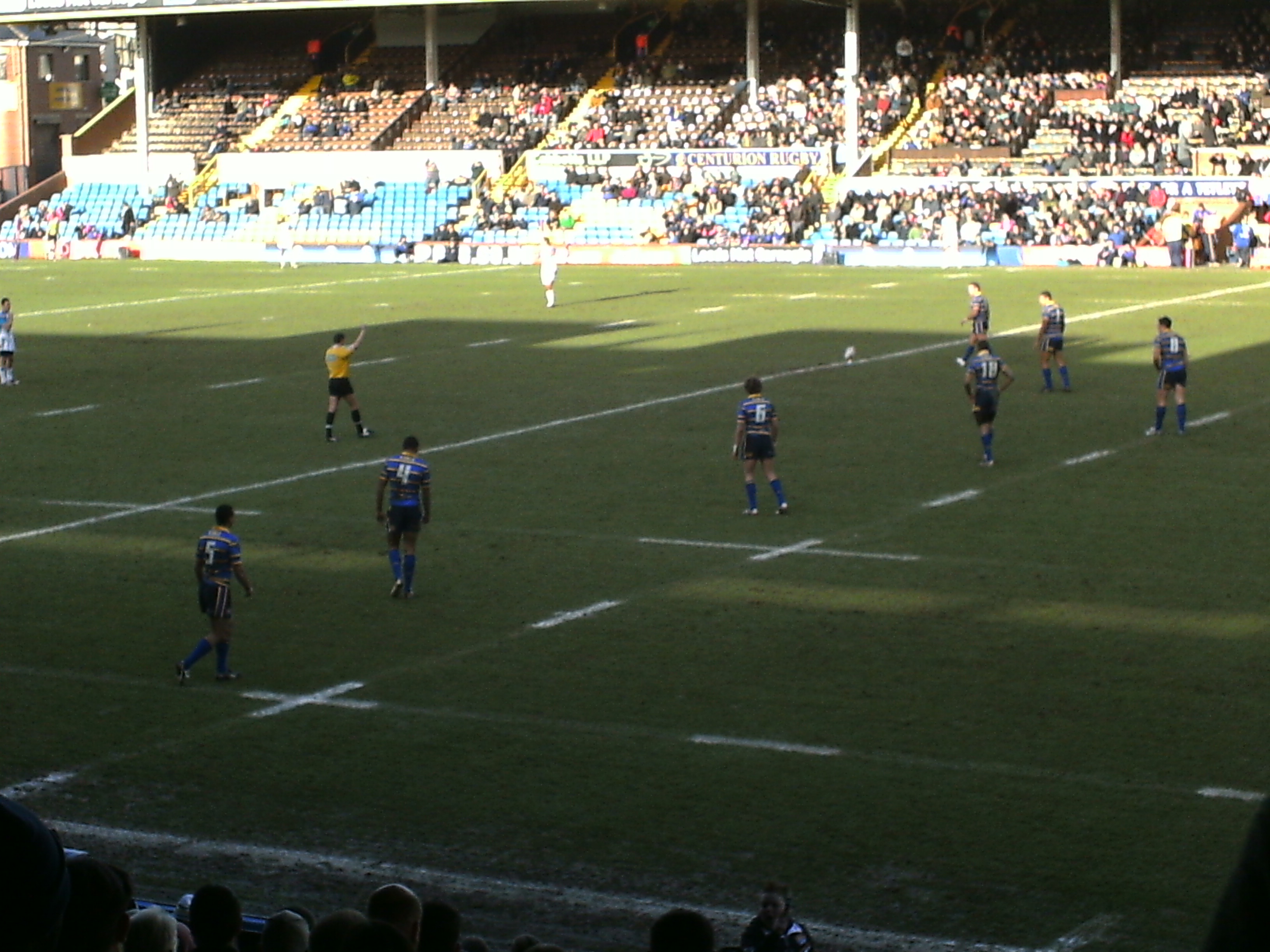
Leeds Rhinos and Wakefield Trinity contesting the 2008 Boxing Day Festive Challenge friendly at Headingley

Players on the pitch are divided into forwards and backs, although the game's rules apply to all players the same way. Each position has a designated number to identify himself from other players. These numbers help to identify which position a person is playing. The system of numbering players is different depending on which country the match is played in. In Australia and New Zealand, each player is usually given a number corresponding to their playing position on the field. However, since 1996 European teams have been able to grant players specific squad numbers, which they keep without regard to the position they play, similarly to association football.

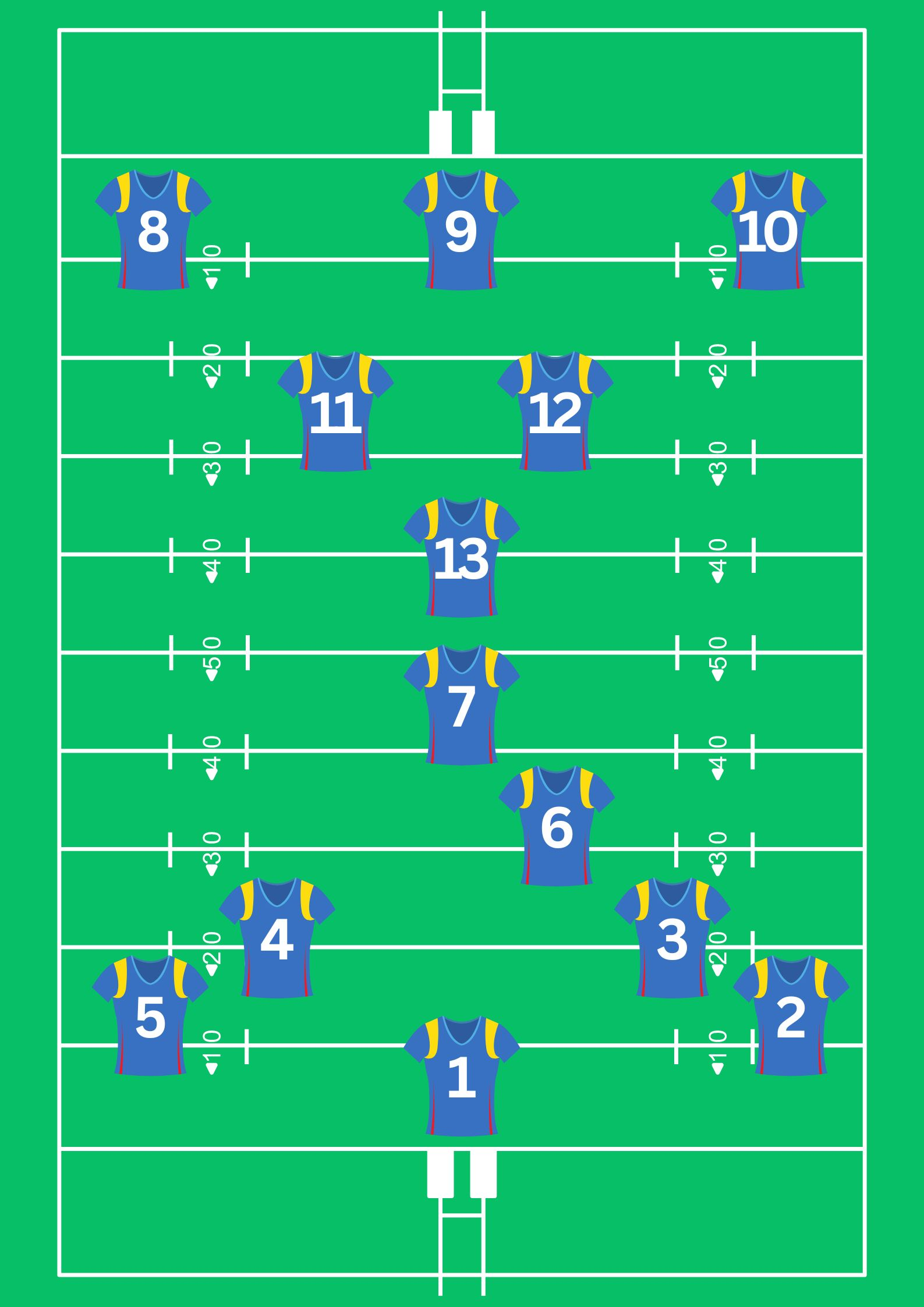
A standard Rugby League formation, showing where different positions can be placed.

Substitutes (generally referred to as "the bench") are allowed in the sport, and are typically used when a player gets tired or injured, although they can also be used tactically. Each team is currently allowed four substitutes, and in Australia and New Zealand, these players occupy shirt numbers 14 to 22. There are no limitations on which players must occupy these interchangeable slots. Generally, twelve interchanges are allowed in any game from each team, although in the National Rugby League, this was reduced to ten prior to the 2008 season and further reduced to eight prior to the 2016 season. If a team has to interchange a player due to the blood bin rule or due to injury, and this was the result of misconduct from the opposing team, the compromised team does not have to use one of its allocated interchanges to take the player in question off the field.

=== Backs ===
The backs are generally smaller, faster and more agile than the forwards. They are often the most creative and evasive players on the field, relying on running, kicking and handling skills, as well as tactics and set plays, to break the defensive line.

- The title of fullback (numbered 1) comes from the fullback's defensive position where the player drops out of the defensive line to cover the rear from kicks and runners breaking the line. Therefore, fullbacks are usually good ball catchers and clinical tacklers. In attack, the fullback will typically make runs into the attack or support a runner in anticipation of a pass out of the tackle. Fullbacks can play a role in attack similar to a halfback or five-eighth and the fact that the fullback does not have to defend in the first defensive line means that a coach can keep a playmaker from the tackling responsibilities of the first line whilst allowing them to retain their attacking role.
- The wingers (numbered 2 and 5) are normally the fastest players in a team and play on the far left and right fringes of the field (the wings). Their main task is to receive passes and score tries. The wingers also drop back on the last tackle to cover the left and right sides of the field for kicks while the fullback covers the middle.
- The centres (numbered 3 and 4) are positioned one in from the wings and together complete what is known as the three-quarter line. Usually the best mixture of power and vision, their main role is to try to create attacking opportunities for their team and defend against those of the opposition. Along with the wingers, the centres score plenty of tries throughout a season. They usually have a large build and therefore can often play in the second-row.

Usually, the stand-off/five-eighth and scrum-half/half-back are a team's creative unit or 'playmakers'. During the interactions between a team's 'key' players (five-eighth, half-back, fullback, lock forward, and hooker), the five-eighth and half-back will usually be involved in most passing moves. These two positions are commonly called the "halves".

- The stand-off half, or five-eighth (numbered 6): There is not much difference between the stand-off half and the scrum half (halfback), in that both players may operate in front of the pack during 'forward play' (as prime receiver [7] and shadow receiver [6], one on each side of the ruck, or both on same side of the ruck), and both players may operate in front of the backs during 'back play' (as prime pivot [6] and shadow pivot [7], one on each side of the pack, or both on same side of the ruck / pack). The Five-Eighth position is named with regard to the distance that the player stands in relevance to the team.
- The halfback (numbered 7): There is not much difference between the halfback and the five-eighth, in that both players may operate in front of the pack during 'forward play' (as prime receiver [7] and shadow receiver [6], one on each side of the ruck, or both on same side of the ruck). Both players may operate in front of the backs during 'back play' (as prime pivot [6] and shadow pivot [7], one on each side of the ruck/pack, or both on same side of the ruck/pack). The halfback position is named with regard to halfway between the fullback and the forwards.

=== Forwards ===
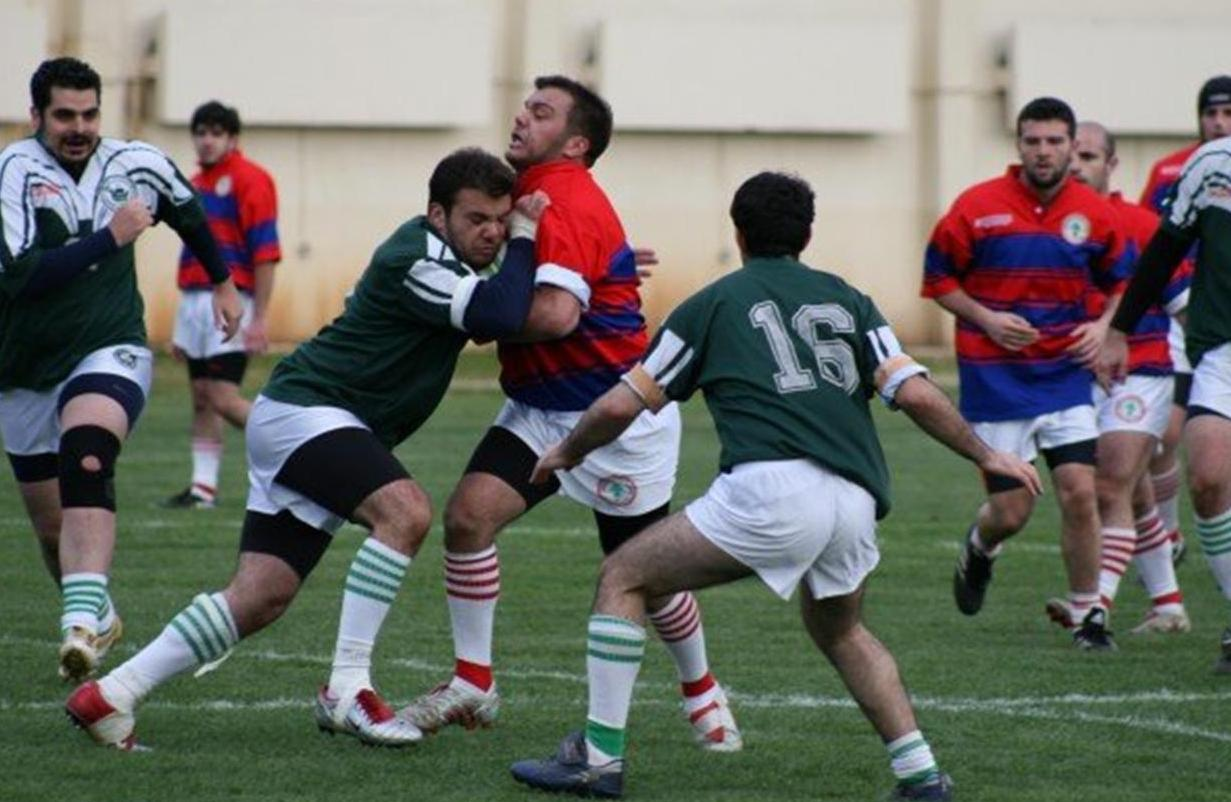
Rugby league is noted for its hard physical play.

The forwards' two responsibilities can be broken into "normal play" and "scrum play". For information on a forward's role in the scrum see rugby league scrummage. Forward positions are traditionally named after the player's position in the scrum yet are equal with respect to "normal play" with the exception of the hooker. Forward positions are traditionally assigned as follows:

- The props or front-row forwards (numbered 8 and 10) are normally the largest players on field. They are positioned in the centre of the line. The prop will be an "enforcer", dissuading the opposition from attacking the centre of the defensive line and, in attack, will give the team momentum by taking the ball up to the defence aggressively.
- The hooker (numbered 9) is most likely to play the role of dummy half. In defence the hooker usually defends in the middle of the line against the opposition's props and second-rowers. The hooker will be responsible for organising the defence in the middle of the field. In attack as dummy-half this player is responsible for starting the play from every play-the-ball by either passing the ball to the right player, or, at opportune moments, running from dummy-half. It is vital that the hooker can pass very well. Traditionally, hookers "hooked" the ball in the scrum. Hookers also make probably more tackles than any other player on the field. The hooker is always involved in the play and needs to be very fit. They need to have a very good knowledge of the game and the players around them.
- The second-row forwards (numbered 11 and 12). The modern day second row is very similar to a centre and is expected to be faster, more mobile and have more skills than the prop and will play amongst the three-quarters, providing strength in attack and defence when the ball is passed out to the wings. Good second-rowers combine the skills and responsibilities of props and centres in the course of the game.
- The Loose forward or Lock (numbered 13) is the only forward in the third (last) row of the scrum. They are usually among the fittest players on the field, covering the entire field on both attacking and defending duties. Typically they are big ball-runners who can occasionally slot in as a passing link or kick option; it is not uncommon for locks to have the skills of a five-eighth and to play a similar role in the team.

== Rugby league worldwide ==
Rugby league is played in over 70 nations throughout the world. Papua New Guinea is the only country to have rugby league as its national sport. Four countries – Australia, England, France, and New Zealand – have teams that play at a professional level. 45 national teams are ranked by the RLIF and a further 32 are officially recognized and unranked. The strongest rugby league nations are Australia, England, New Zealand, Samoa and Tonga.

=== World Cup ===
The Rugby League World Cup is the highest form of representative rugby league. Countries that have contested are Australia, Cook Islands, England, Fiji, France, Ireland, Italy, Jamaica, Lebanon, New Zealand, Papua New Guinea, Russia, Samoa, Scotland, South Africa, Tonga, US and Wales. The 2021 Rugby League World Cup, which was hosted by England during October and November 2022, staged the Men's, Women's and Wheelchair competitions together for the first time. The competition formerly featured 16 teams, but has been cut down to 10 for the upcoming 2026 Rugby League World Cup.

=== Oceania and South Pacific ===
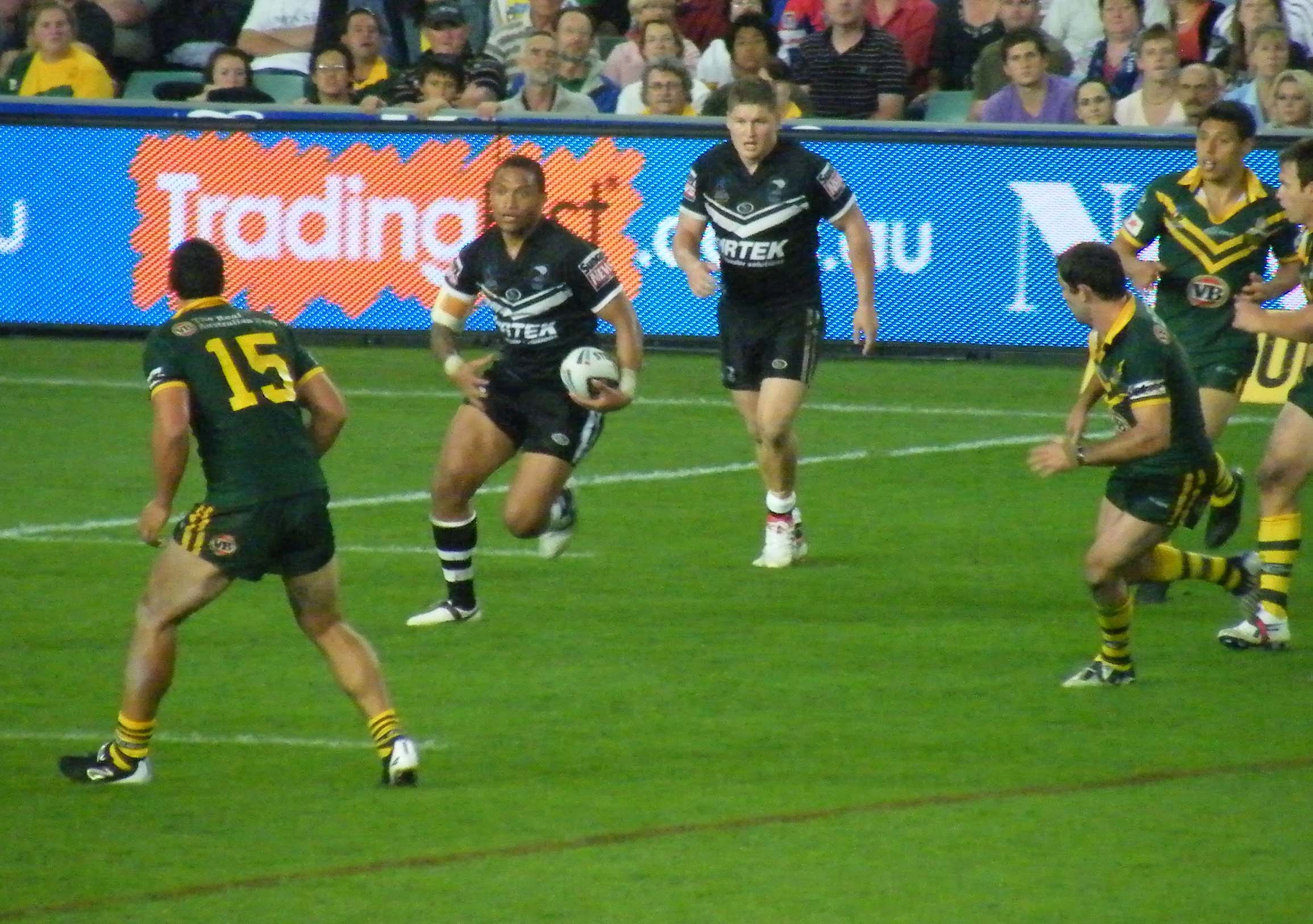
Australia vs New Zealand at the 2008 Rugby League World Cup

The Asia-Pacific Rugby League Confederation's purpose is to spread the sport of rugby league throughout their region along with other governing bodies such as the ARL and NZRL. Since rugby league was introduced to Australia in 1908, it has become the largest television sport and 3rd most attended sport in Australia. Neighbouring Papua New Guinea is one of two countries to have rugby league as its national sport (with Cook Islands). Australia's elite club competition also features a team from Auckland, New Zealand's biggest city. Rugby league is the dominant winter sport in the eastern Australian states of New South Wales and Queensland. The game is also among the predominant sports of Tonga and is played in other Pacific nations such as Samoa and Fiji. Researchers have found that rugby league has been able to help with improving development in the islands. In Australia, and indeed the rest of the region, the annual State of Origin series ranks among the most popular sporting events.

=== Europe ===
The Rugby League European Federation are responsible for developing rugby league in Europe.

Rugby league is most popular along the M62 corridor in the north of England where the sport originated. Icons shown are the location of teams competing in the 2025 Super League (barring Catalans Dragons) all located along the M62 Corridor.

In England, rugby league has traditionally been associated with the historic northern counties of Yorkshire, Lancashire, and Cumberland, where the game originated, especially in towns and cities along the M62 corridor. Its popularity has also increased elsewhere. As of 2024, only two of the twelve Super League teams are based outside of these traditional counties: Catalans Dragons and London Broncos. One other team from outside the United Kingdom, Toulouse Olympique, competes in the British rugby league system, although not at the highest tier Super League level, but rather in the second tier Championship.

Super League average attendances are in the 8,000 to 9,500 range. The average Super League match attendance in 2014 was 8,365. In 2018 average Super League match attendance was 8,547. Ranked the eighth most popular sport in the UK overall, rugby league is the 27th most popular participation sport in England according to figures released by Sport England; the total number of rugby league participants in England aged 16 and over was 44,900 in 2017. This is a 39% drop from 10 years ago. While the sport is largely concentrated in the north of England there have been complaints about its lack of profile in the British media. On the eve of the 2017 Rugby League World Cup final where England would face Australia, English amateur rugby league coach Ben Dawson stated, "we're in the final of a World Cup. First time in more than 30 years and there's no coverage anywhere".

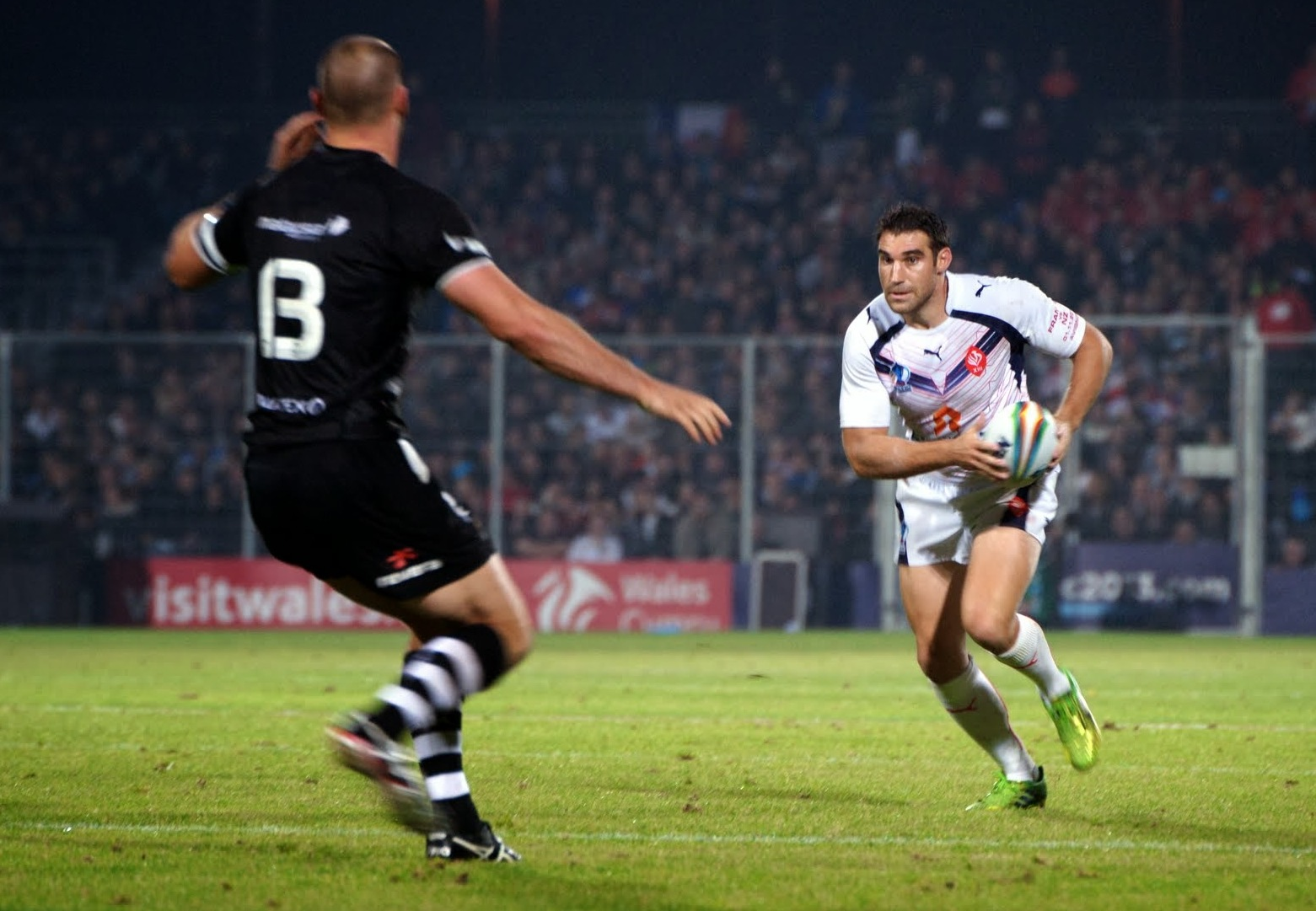
France vs New Zealand in the 2013 Rugby League World Cup at Parc des Sports (Avignon)

France first played rugby league as late as 1934, where in the five years prior to the Second World War, the sport's popularity increased as Frenchmen became disenchanted with the state of French rugby union in the 1930s. However, after the Allied Forces were defeated by Germany in June 1940, the Vichy regime in the south seized assets belonging to rugby league authorities and clubs and banned the sport due to its opposition to professionalism in sport, and lobbying from rugby union figures. The sport was unbanned after the Liberation of Paris in August 1944 and the collapse of the Vichy regime, although it was still actively marginalised by the French authorities until the 1990s. Despite this, the national side appeared in the finals of the 1954 and 1968 World Cups, and the country hosted the 1954 event.

In 1996, a French team, Paris Saint-Germain was one of eleven teams which formed the new Super League, although the club was dissolved in 1997. In 2006, the Super League admitted the Catalans Dragons, a team from Perpignan in the southern Languedoc-Roussillon region. They have subsequently reached the 2007 Challenge Cup Final and made the playoffs of the 2008 Super League XIII season. The success of the Dragons in Super League has initiated a renaissance in French rugby league, with new-found enthusiasm for the sport in the south of the country where most of the Super XIII teams are based. In other parts of Europe, the game is played at semi-professional and amateur level.

=== North America ===
As of 2023, there is no professional rugby league in North America. From 2017 to 2020, the Toronto Wolfpack were North America's only active professional Rugby League team, competing in the English Rugby League system. They won the 2017 Kingstone Press League 1 in their inaugural season and earned promotion to the 2018 Rugby League Championship. In 2019 The Wolfpack won promotion to the Super League, lasting only a few months before having to withdraw due to the ongoing worldwide COVID-19 pandemic. New ownership is currently trying to revive the club with matches against amateur clubs in the US and Canada. Beginning in 2022, the Ottawa Aces were scheduled to join the English league pyramid, becoming the only Canadian team in the system after the Wolfpack were denied re-entry. The club subsequently relocated to Penryn, Cornwall, and are now known as Cornwall R.L.F.C.

In 2021, the North American Rugby League announced an attempt to be North America's professional championship, with Canadian club Toronto Wolfpack joining several USA Rugby League clubs, New York Freedom and Cleveland Rugby League to form the league's inaugural season. Several brand new clubs from Western USA were scheduled to join in 2022 but never played. The new competition is sanctioned by Canada Rugby League, but not yet by the United States governing body. While some exhibition matches were played in 2021 and 2022, NARL was defunct by 2023․

=== Other countries ===
The early 21st century has seen other countries take up the game and compete in international rugby league with the Rugby League European Federation and Asia-Pacific Rugby League Confederation expanding the game to new areas such as Chile, Canada, Ghana, Philippines, Czech Republic, Germany, The Netherlands, Sweden, Norway, Spain, Sri Lanka, Hungary, Turkey, Thailand and Brazil to name a few.

=== Domestic professional competitions ===
The two most prominent full-time professional leagues are the Australian National Rugby League and the British Super League (with teams from New Zealand and France respectively).

Other professional and semi professional leagues include Australia's Queensland Cup (which includes a team from Papua New Guinea) and NSW Cup, the British RFL Championship and RFL League 1, the French Super XIII and Elite 2.

The Papua New Guinea National Rugby League operates as a semi-professional competition and enjoys nationwide media coverage, being the national sport of the country.

== Variants ==
Five main variant sports of rugby league exist worldwide; Touch, OzTag, League tag, Nines, and Sevens.

Touch, OzTag, and League Tag are all non-contact versions of the sport, where as Nines and Sevens are both reduced form (shorter match times and smaller teams) of the sport.

=== Touch ===
Touch (also known as touch football or touch rugby) is a variant of rugby league that is conducted under the direction of the Federation of International Touch (FIT). Though it shares similarities and history with rugby league, it is recognised as a sport in its own right due to its differences which have been developed over the sport's lifetime.

Touch is a variation of rugby league with the tackling of opposing players replaced by a touch. As touches must be made with minimal force, touch is therefore considered a limited-contact sport. The original basic rules of touch were established in the 1960s by members of the South Sydney Junior Rugby League Club in Sydney, Australia.

=== OzTag ===
OzTag is a non-contact form of rugby league, and can be seen as a variation of British tag rugby. Cronulla Sharks and St George Dragons halfback Perry Haddock introduced the sport in Australia while coaching the 1992 St George Jersey Flegg side. Together with Chris Parkes, the two took the sport to fields across Australia. Today, it is played by over 200,000 players in organised leagues across the country.

=== League Tag ===
League Tag replaces tackling with the removal of one of two tags carried on an opponent's hips, attached directly to specific League Tag shorts with Velcro patches, but otherwise retains almost all other rules of traditional rugby league (such as kicking). A number of additional rules are also added relating to the specific issues associated with a tag based game.

=== Nines ===
Rugby League played with nine players per team with nine minutes per half, in addition to slight rule modifications to aid the game.

=== Sevens ===
Rugby League played with seven players per team with seven minutes per half, in addition to slight rule modifications to aid the game.

== Attendances ==
=== International ===
The top five attendances for rugby league test matches (International) are:

Game	Date	Team 1	Score	Team 2	Venue	City	Crowd
2013 World Cup final	30 November 2013	Australia	34–2	New Zealand	Old Trafford	Manchester	74,468
1992 World Cup final	24 October 1992	Australia	10–6	(United Kingdom) Great Britain	Wembley Stadium	London	73,631
1932 Ashes series, game 1	6 June 1932	(United Kingdom) Great Britain	8–6	Australia	Sydney Cricket Ground	Sydney	70,204
1962 Ashes series, game 1	9 June 1962	(United Kingdom) Great Britain	31–12	Australia	Sydney Cricket Ground	Sydney	70,174
1958 Ashes series, game 1	14 June 1958	Australia	25–8	(United Kingdom) Great Britain	Sydney Cricket Ground	Sydney	68,777

=== Domestic ===
The top five attendances for domestic based rugby league matches are:

Game	Date	Team 1	Score	Team 2	Venue	City	Crowd
1999 NRL Grand Final	26 September 1999	Melbourne Storm	20–18	St George Illawarra Dragons	Stadium Australia	Sydney	107,999
1999 NRL season Round 1	6 March 1999	Newcastle Knights	41–18	Manly-Warringah Sea Eagles	Stadium Australia	Sydney	104,583*
1999 NRL season Round 1	6 March 1999	Parramatta Eels	20–10	St George Illawarra Dragons	Stadium Australia	Sydney	104,583*
1954 Challenge Cup Final replay	5 May 1954	Warrington Wolves	8–4	Halifax	Odsal Stadium	Bradford	102,569**
1985 Challenge Cup Final	4 May 1985	Wigan Warriors	28–24	Hull F.C.	Wembley Stadium	London	99,801
1966 Challenge Cup Final	21 May 1966	St. Helens	21–2	Wigan Warriors	Wembley Stadium	London	98,536

* NRL double header played to open Round 1 of the 1999 NRL season. Figure shown is the total attendance which is officially counted for both games.
** The official attendance of the 1954 Challenge Cup Final replay was 102,569. Unofficial estimates put the attendance as high as 150,000, Bradford Police confirming 120,000.

== See also ==
- History of rugby league
- List of rugby league terms
- Playing rugby league
- List of international rugby league teams
- List of official Rugby League organisations
- Rugby League World Cup
- Women's Rugby League World Cup
- Wheelchair Rugby League World Cup
- Rugby league nines
- Rugby league sevens
- Tag Rugby (OzTag) – a completely non-contact version of rugby league
- Touch football – an almost non-contact version
- League tag – A semi-contact version of Rugby League
- Comparison topics
  - Comparison of rugby league and rugby union
  - Comparison of American football and rugby league
  - Comparison of Canadian football and rugby league
- Geography of rugby league
