= 2013 South Sydney Rabbitohs season =

- NRL Rank: 2nd
- Play-off result: Preliminary Finalists
- 2013 record: Wins: 18; draws: 0; losses: 6
- Points scored: For: 588; against: 384

Team information
- CEO: Shane Richardson
- Head Coach: Michael Maguire
- Captain: John Sutton
- Stadium: ANZ Stadium
- Avg. attendance: 22,261
- High attendance: 59,708 v Easts, Rd 26

Top scorers
- Tries: Greg Inglis (14)
- Goals: Adam Reynolds (97)
- Points: Adam Reynolds (212)
← 2012	List of seasons	2014 →

The 2013 South Sydney Rabbitohs season was the 104th in the club's history. Coached by Michael Maguire and captained by John Sutton, they competed in the National Rugby League's 2013 Telstra Premiership, finishing the regular season in second place.

== Pre-season ==
In 2013, the Rabbitohs again competed in three pre-season trial matches.

Date	Round	Opponent	Venue	Score	Attendance	Report
Sat 9 Feb	Return to Redfern	Papua New Guinea	ATP Performance Centre, Redfern	38–12	5,000	
Sat 16 Feb	Coffs Harbour Trial	Newcastle Knights	BCU International Stad., Coffs Harbour	12–18	4,000	
Fri 22 Feb	Charity Shield	St. George Illawarra Dragons	ANZ Stadium, Sydney	28–12	20,675	
Legend: Win 13+ Win Loss 13+ Loss Draw

== Regular season ==
Date	Round	Opponent	Venue	Score	Attendance	Report
Thu 7 Mar	1	Sydney Roosters	Allianz Stadium, Sydney	10–28	35,952	
Mon 18 Mar	2	Cronulla Sharks	ANZ Stadium, Sydney	14–12	14,128	
Sun 24 Mar	3	Penrith Panthers	Centrebet Stadium, Penrith	32–44	12,940	
Fri 29 Mar	4	Canterbury-Bankstown Bulldogs	ANZ Stadium, Sydney (Away Game)	12–17	51,686	
Sun 7 Apr	5	New Zealand Warriors	Mt. Smart Stadium, New Zealand	22–24	13,512	
Sat 13 Apr	6	Melbourne Storm	ANZ Stadium, Sydney	10–17	32,671	
		Representative Weekend				
Fri 26 Apr	7	Manly-Warringah Sea Eagles	Brookvale Oval, Manly	12–20	20,510	
Fri 3 May	8	Brisbane Broncos	Suncorp Stadium, Brisbane	12–26	39,111	
Fri 10 May	9	North Queensland Cowboys	ANZ Stadium, Sydney	28–10	15,972	
Fri 17 May	10	Wests Tigers	ANZ Stadium, Sydney	54–10	19,719	
Mon 27 May	11	Cronulla Sharks	Sharks Stadium, Woolooware	12–14	12,243	
Sat 1 Jun	12	Newcastle Knights	ANZ Stadium, Sydney	25–18	13,225	
	13	Bye				
Sun 16 Jun	14	Gold Coast Titans	Barlow Park, Cairns (Home Game)	30–24	16,118	
Sun 23 Jun	15	Parramatta Eels	ANZ Stadium, Sydney (Away Game)	10–30	17,077	
Fri 28 Jun	16	Canberra Raiders	ANZ Stadium, Sydney	32–2	11,167	
Sun 7 Jul	17	New Zealand Warriors	NIB Stadium, Perth (Home Game)	30–13	20,221	
	18	Bye				
Mon 22 Jul	19	St. George Illawarra Dragons	ANZ Stadium, Sydney	18–22	14,571	
Sat 27 Jul	20	Gold Coast Titans	Skilled Park, Robina	32–4	20,392	
Sat 3 Aug	21	North Queensland Cowboys	1300SMILES Stadium, Townsville	12–30	13,045	
Fri 9 Aug	22	Melbourne Storm	AAMI Park, Melbourne	8–26	21,244	
Fri 16 Aug	23	Manly-Warringah Sea Eagles	Bluetongue Stadium, Gosford (Home Game)	22–10	20,060	
Fri 23 Aug	24	Canterbury-Bankstown Bulldogs	ANZ Stadium, Sydney	28–20	29,571	
Sat 31 Aug	25	Wests Tigers	Allianz Stadium, Sydney	18–32	14,891	
Fri 6 Sep	26	Sydney Roosters	ANZ Stadium, Sydney	12–24	59,708	
Legend: Win 13+ Win Loss 13+ Loss Draw Bye

== Finals Series ==
Date	Round	Opponent	Venue	Score	Attendance	Report
Fri 13 Sep	Qualifying Final	Melbourne Storm	ANZ Stadium, Sydney	20–10	21,609	
Fri 27 Sep	Preliminary Final	Manly Sea Eagles	ANZ Stadium, Sydney	20–30	44,546	
Legend: Win 13+ Win Loss 13+ Loss Draw Bye

== Ladder ==
2013 NRL season
Pos	Team	Pld	W	D	L	B	PF	PA	PD	Pts
1	Sydney Roosters (P)	24	18	0	6	2	640	325	+315	40
2	South Sydney Rabbitohs	24	18	0	6	2	588	384	+204	40
3	Melbourne Storm	24	16	1	7	2	589	373	+216	37
4	Manly Warringah Sea Eagles	24	15	1	8	2	588	366	+222	35
5	Cronulla-Sutherland Sharks	24	14	0	10	2	468	460	+8	32
6	Canterbury-Bankstown Bulldogs	24	13	0	11	2	529	463	+66	30
7	Newcastle Knights	24	12	1	11	2	528	422	+106	29
8	North Queensland Cowboys	24	12	0	12	2	507	431	+76	28
9	Gold Coast Titans	24	11	0	13	2	500	518	−18	26
10	Penrith Panthers	24	11	0	13	2	495	532	−37	26
11	New Zealand Warriors	24	11	0	13	2	495	554	−59	26
12	Brisbane Broncos	24	10	1	13	2	434	477	−43	25
13	Canberra Raiders	24	10	0	14	2	434	624	−190	24
14	St. George Illawarra Dragons	24	7	0	17	2	379	530	−151	18
15	Wests Tigers	24	7	0	17	2	386	687	−301	18
16	Parramatta Eels	24	5	0	19	2	326	740	−414	14

== Transfers ==
Gains

Player	Gained From
Jeff Lima	Wigan Warriors
Ben Te'o	Brisbane Broncos
Tom Burgess	Bradford Bulls
Beau Champion	Gold Coast Titans
Bryson Goodwin	Canterbury-Bankstown Bulldogs

Losses

Player	Lost To
Eddy Pettybourne	Wests Tigers
Scott Geddes	Retired
Dave Taylor	Gold Coast Titans
Fetuli Talanoa	Unknown

== Player statistics ==
Player	Appearances	Tries	Goals	Field Goals	Total Points
–	–	–	–	–	–

== Representative honours ==
Player	All Stars	Anzac Test	Pacific Test	City / Country	State of Origin 1	State of Origin 2	State of Origin 3	Four Nations
