= 2013 NRL season =

106th season of professional rugby league club competition in Australia

2013 National Rugby League
- Duration: March 7 – October 6, 2013
- Teams: 16
- Premiers: Sydney Roosters (13th title)
- Minor premiers: Sydney Roosters (17th title)
- Matches played: 201
- Points scored: 8210
- Average attendance: 16,643
- Total attendance: 3,345,248
- Top points scorer: James Maloney (252)
- Wooden spoon: Parramatta Eels (13th spoon)
- Dally M Medal: Cooper Cronk
- Top try-scorer(s): David Williams (20); Jorge Taufua (20); Michael Jennings (20)

The 2013 NRL season was the 106th season of professional rugby league club competition in Australia. The National Rugby League's main competition, named the 2013 Telstra Premiership after major sponsors Telstra, was contested by sixteen teams during the regular season, which lasted from March to September, and resulted in the top eight finishing teams, who went on to contest the finals. The season culminated in the Grand Final, in which the Sydney Roosters defeated the Manly-Warringah Sea Eagles 26-18 to win their first NRL premiership since 2002.

The NRL season started with the 2013 NRL All Stars match, which was played in February. The 2013 Holden Cup, the NRL's Under-20s competition, also took place alongside the Premiership, with most matches held before the first grade competition. The Parramatta Eels picked up the wooden spoon for the second consecutive season after winning only five matches for the season.

== Season summary ==
=== Cronulla-Sutherland Sharks supplements saga ===
The 2013 NRL season was marred by a major investigation involving the Cronulla-Sutherland Sharks' supplements program, which was alleged to have taken place during the 2011 season. Following an almost year-long investigation by ASADA and the NRL, a series of penalties were applied on the club, including, among others, the 12-month suspension of Shane Flanagan as the club's head coach, as well as a $1,000,000 fine (with $400,000 suspended) and the deregistration of Trent Elkin as the club's trainer.

Despite the off-field controversy, the Sharks were still able to reach the NRL finals for the second consecutive year, losing to eventual grand finalists Manly in the second week.

=== Teams ===
The lineup of teams remained unchanged for the 7th consecutive year. A report conducted by Brand Finance valued the Penrith Panthers club at $46.2m, the highest of any Australian sporting brand, while the Brisbane Broncos had the highest brand equity.

Colours	Club	Season	Stadium	Head coach	Captain(s)
	Brisbane Broncos	26th season	Suncorp Stadium	Anthony Griffin	Sam Thaiday
	Canterbury-Bankstown Bulldogs	79th season	ANZ Stadium	Des Hasler	Michael Ennis
	Canberra Raiders	32nd season	Canberra Stadium	David Furner→Andrew Dunemann	Terry Campese
	Cronulla-Sutherland Sharks	47th season	Remondis Stadium	~~Shane Flanagan~~ Peter Sharp (interim)	Paul Gallen
	Gold Coast Titans	7th season	Skilled Park	John Cartwright	Nate Myles & Greg Bird
	Manly Warringah Sea Eagles	64th season	Brookvale Oval	Geoff Toovey	Jamie Lyon & Jason King
	Melbourne Storm	16th season	AAMI Park	Craig Bellamy	Cameron Smith
	Newcastle Knights	26th season	Hunter Stadium	Wayne Bennett	Kurt Gidley→Jarrod Mullen
	New Zealand Warriors	19th season	Mt Smart Stadium	Matthew Elliott	Simon Mannering
	North Queensland Cowboys	19th season	Dairy Farmers Stadium	Neil Henry	Johnathan Thurston & Matt Scott
	Parramatta Eels	67th season	Parramatta Stadium	Ricky Stuart	Reni Maitua & Jarryd Hayne
	Penrith Panthers	47th season	Centrebet Stadium	Ivan Cleary	Kevin Kingston
	St. George Illawarra Dragons	15th season	WIN Jubilee Oval; WIN Stadium	Steve Price	Ben Creagh
	South Sydney Rabbitohs	104th season	ANZ Stadium	Michael Maguire	John Sutton
	Sydney Roosters	106th season	Allianz Stadium	Trent Robinson	Anthony Minichiello
	Wests Tigers	14th season	Campbelltown Stadium; Leichhardt Oval	Mick Potter	Robbie Farah

== Ladder ==
2013 NRL season
Pos	Team	Pld	W	D	L	B	PF	PA	PD	Pts
1	Sydney Roosters (P)	24	18	0	6	2	640	325	+315	40
2	South Sydney Rabbitohs	24	18	0	6	2	588	384	+204	40
3	Melbourne Storm	24	16	1	7	2	589	373	+216	37
4	Manly Warringah Sea Eagles	24	15	1	8	2	588	366	+222	35
5	Cronulla-Sutherland Sharks	24	14	0	10	2	468	460	+8	32
6	Canterbury-Bankstown Bulldogs	24	13	0	11	2	529	463	+66	30
7	Newcastle Knights	24	12	1	11	2	528	422	+106	29
8	North Queensland Cowboys	24	12	0	12	2	507	431	+76	28
9	Gold Coast Titans	24	11	0	13	2	500	518	−18	26
10	Penrith Panthers	24	11	0	13	2	495	532	−37	26
11	New Zealand Warriors	24	11	0	13	2	495	554	−59	26
12	Brisbane Broncos	24	10	1	13	2	434	477	−43	25
13	Canberra Raiders	24	10	0	14	2	434	624	−190	24
14	St. George Illawarra Dragons	24	7	0	17	2	379	530	−151	18
15	Wests Tigers	24	7	0	17	2	386	687	−301	18
16	Parramatta Eels	24	5	0	19	2	326	740	−414	14

=== Ladder progression ===
	Team	1	2	3	4	5	6	7	8	9	10	11	12	13	14	15	16	17	18	19	20	21	22	23	24	25	26
1	Sydney	0	2	4	6	6	8	10	12	14	16	16	18	20	20	22	24	26	28	30	32	34	36	38	38	38	40
2	South Sydney	2	4	6	8	10	10	12	14	16	18	18	20	22	24	26	28	30	32	32	34	34	34	36	38	40	40
3	Melbourne	2	4	6	8	10	12	14	14	14	15	17	19	21	23	23	23	25	25	27	27	29	31	33	35	35	37
4	Manly-Warringah	2	4	4	6	8	10	10	12	12	13	15	17	17	17	19	19	21	23	25	27	29	31	31	33	35	35
5	Cronulla-Sutherland	2	2	4	4	4	4	4	6	8	10	12	14	14	16	18	18	20	22	22	24	26	26	28	30	30	32
6	Canterbury-Bankstown	0	2	2	2	2	2	4	6	8	8	10	12	14	16	16	18	18	20	22	24	26	26	28	28	30	30
7	Newcastle	2	2	4	6	6	8	10	10	10	12	12	12	12	12	14	16	18	20	22	22	23	25	25	25	27	29
8	North Queensland	2	2	2	2	4	4	6	8	8	8	8	8	8	10	12	14	14	14	16	16	18	20	22	24	26	28
9	Gold Coast	0	2	4	6	6	8	8	8	10	10	12	14	16	16	18	18	18	20	20	20	22	24	24	24	26	26
10	Penrith	2	2	2	2	2	2	4	4	6	8	10	12	12	12	14	16	18	20	20	20	20	20	22	24	24	26
11	New Zealand	0	0	0	2	2	2	2	4	4	4	6	8	10	12	14	16	16	18	20	22	22	22	22	24	26	26
12	Brisbane	0	2	2	2	4	6	8	8	8	10	10	10	10	12	14	14	14	14	16	18	19	21	23	23	23	25
13	Canberra	0	0	2	2	4	6	6	8	10	10	10	12	14	16	16	16	18	20	22	24	24	24	24	24	24	24
14	St. George Illawarra	0	0	0	2	4	6	6	6	6	8	8	8	10	10	12	12	12	14	16	16	16	16	16	16	16	18
15	Wests	0	2	4	4	4	4	4	4	4	4	6	8	10	10	12	14	14	16	16	16	16	16	16	18	18	18
16	Parramatta	2	2	2	2	4	4	4	4	6	6	6	8	8	8	8	10	10	10	10	10	10	12	12	12	14	14

== Finals series ==
For the second year the NRL uses the finals system previously implemented by the ARL competition from the 1990s (also used as the AFL final eight system) to decide the grand finalists from the top eight finishing teams. Both the seventh-placed Newcastle Knights and minor premiers Sydney Roosters return the finals after last featuring respectively in 2011 and 2010, whilst the other six teams (Bulldogs, Storm, Rabbitohs, Sea Eagles, Cowboys & Sharks) were featured in the preceding finals series.

Home	Score	Away	Match Information
Home	Score	Away	Date and Time (Local)	Venue	Referees	Crowd
QUALIFYING & ELIMINATION FINALS
South Sydney Rabbitohs	20 – 10	Melbourne Storm	13 September 2013, 7:45pm	ANZ Stadium	Shane Hayne; Jared Maxwell	21,609
Cronulla-Sutherland Sharks	20 – 18	North Queensland Cowboys	14 September 2013, 4:00pm	Allianz Stadium	Matt Cecchin; Henry Peranara	32,747
Sydney Roosters	4 – 0	Manly Warringah Sea Eagles	14 September 2013, 7:00pm	Allianz Stadium	Ben Cummins; Gerard Sutton	32,747
Canterbury-Bankstown Bulldogs	6 – 22	Newcastle Knights	15 September 2013, 4:00pm	ANZ Stadium	Ashley Klein; Gavin Badger	23,086
SEMI FINALS
Manly Warringah Sea Eagles	24 – 18	Cronulla-Sutherland Sharks	20 September 2013, 7:45pm	Allianz Stadium	Shayne Hayne; Ashley Klein	23,837
Melbourne Storm	16 – 18	Newcastle Knights	21 September 2013, 7:45pm	AAMI Park	Ben Cummins; Gerard Sutton	19,649
PRELIMINARY FINALS
South Sydney Rabbitohs	20 – 30	Manly Warringah Sea Eagles	27 September 2013, 7:45pm	ANZ Stadium	Ben Cummins; Gerard Sutton	44,546
Sydney Roosters	40 – 14	Newcastle Knights	28 September 2013, 7:45pm	Allianz Stadium	Shayne Hayne; Ashley Klein	37,752

=== Chart ===
Qualifying and elimination finals
14 Sept, Allianz Stadium
1	Sydney	4
4	Manly-Warringah	0
14 Sept, Allianz Stadium
5	Cronulla-Sutherland	20
8	North Queensland	18
15 Sept, ANZ Stadium
6	Canterbury-Bankstown	6
7	Newcastle	22
13 Sept, ANZ Stadium
2	South Sydney	20
3	Melbourne	10

Semi-finals
20 Sept, Allianz Stadium
Manly-Warringah	24
Cronulla-Sutherland	18
21 Sept, AAMI Park
Melbourne	16
Newcastle	18

Preliminary finals
28 Sept, Allianz Stadium
Sydney	40
Newcastle	14
27 Sept, ANZ Stadium
South Sydney	20
Manly-Warringah	30

Grand final
6 Oct, ANZ Stadium
Sydney	26
Manly-Warringah	18

== Grand final ==
Sunday, 6 October
19:15

Sydney Roosters	26 – 18	Manly-Warringah Sea Eagles
Tries: Daniel Tupou; Aidan Guerra; Shaun Kenny-Dowall; Michael Jennings; Goals: James Maloney (5/5)	Half Time: 8 – 6	Tries: Jorge Taufua; Jamie Lyon; Steve Matai; Goals: (2/3) Jamie Lyon

ANZ Stadium, Sydney
Attendance: 81,491
Referee: Shayne Hayne, Ben Cummins
Clive Churchill Medal: Daly Cherry-Evans

== Regular season player statistics ==
The following statistics are of the conclusion of round 26.

Top 5 point scorers

Points	Player	Tries	Goals	Field Goals
230	James Maloney	9	97	0
210	Jamie Lyon	14	77	0
204	Adam Reynolds	4	93	2
177	Shaun Johnson	10	67	3
170	Cameron Smith	2	81	0

Top 5 try scorers

Tries	Player
19	James McManus
19	David Williams
19	David Simmons
18	Jorge Tafua
17	Michael Jennings
17	Sam Perrett
17	Billy Slater

Top 5 goal scorers

Goals	Player
97	James Maloney
93	Adam Reynolds
81	Cameron Smith
77	Jamie Lyon
75	Aidan Sezer

== 2013 Transfers ==
=== Players ===
Player	2012 Club	2013 Club
Gerard Beale	Brisbane Broncos	St. George Illawarra Dragons
Petero Civoniceva	Brisbane Broncos	Redcliffe Dolphins (Intrust Super Cup)
Ben Te'o	Brisbane Broncos	South Sydney Rabbitohs
Jharal Yow Yeh	Brisbane Broncos	Retirement
Josh Dugan	Canberra Raiders	St. George Illawarra Dragons
Bronson Harrison	Canberra Raiders	St. George Illawarra Dragons
Dimitri Pelo	Canberra Raiders	N/A
Trevor Thurling	Canberra Raiders	Retirement
Travis Waddell	Canberra Raiders	Newcastle Knights
Bryson Goodwin	Canterbury-Bankstown Bulldogs	South Sydney Rabbitohs
Luke MacDougall	Canterbury-Bankstown Bulldogs	Retirement
Corey Payne	Canterbury-Bankstown Bulldogs	Retirement
David Stagg	Canterbury-Bankstown Bulldogs	Brisbane Broncos
Jonathan Wright	Canterbury-Bankstown Bulldogs	Cronulla-Sutherland Sharks
Colin Best	Cronulla-Sutherland Sharks	Retirement
Jeremy Smith	Cronulla-Sutherland Sharks	Newcastle Knights
John Williams	Cronulla-Sutherland Sharks	Retirement
Beau Champion	Gold Coast Titans	South Sydney Rabbitohs
Phil Graham	Gold Coast Titans	Retirement
Michael Henderson	Gold Coast Titans	St. George Illawarra Dragons
Scott Prince	Gold Coast Titans	Brisbane Broncos
Bodene Thompson	Gold Coast Titans	Wests Tigers
Darcy Lussick	Manly Warringah Sea Eagles	Parramatta Eels
Michael Oldfield	Manly Warringah Sea Eagles	Sydney Roosters
Dean Whare	Manly Warringah Sea Eagles	Penrith Panthers
Tony Williams	Manly Warringah Sea Eagles	Canterbury-Bankstown Bulldogs
Richie Faʻaoso	Melbourne Storm	Manly Warringah Sea Eagles
Rory Kostjasyn	Melbourne Storm	North Queensland Cowboys
Jaiman Lowe	Melbourne Storm	Retirement
Todd Lowrie	Melbourne Storm	New Zealand Warriors
Sika Manu	Melbourne Storm	Penrith Panthers
Dane Nielsen	Melbourne Storm	New Zealand Warriors
Anthony Quinn	Melbourne Storm	Newcastle Knights
Joel Edwards	Newcastle Knights	Canberra Raiders
Wes Naiqama	Newcastle Knights	Penrith Panthers
Junior Sa'u	Newcastle Knights	Melbourne Storm
Zeb Taia	Newcastle Knights	Super League: Catalans Dragons
Evarn Tuimavave	Newcastle Knights	Super League: Hull Kingston Rovers
Lewis Brown	New Zealand Warriors	Penrith Panthers
Micheal Luck	New Zealand Warriors	Retirement
James Maloney	New Zealand Warriors	Sydney Roosters
Ukuma Ta'ai	New Zealand Warriors	Super League: Huddersfield Giants
Cory Paterson	North Queensland Cowboys	Super League: Hull Kingston Rovers
Aaron Payne	North Queensland Cowboys	Retirement
James Segeyaro	North Queensland Cowboys	Penrith Panthers
Jordan Atkins	Parramatta Eels	Gold Coast Titans
Luke Burt	Parramatta Eels	Retirement
Nathan Hindmarsh	Parramatta Eels	Retirement
Justin Horo	Parramatta Eels	Manly Warringah Sea Eagles
Casey McGuire	Parramatta Eels	Retirement
Justin Poore	Parramatta Eels	Super League: Wakefield Trinity Wildcats
Taulima Tautai	Parramatta Eels	Super League: Wakefield Trinity Wildcats
Esikeli Tonga	Parramatta Eels	Manly Warringah Sea Eagles
Chris Armit	Penrith Panthers	Retirement
Travis Burns	Penrith Panthers	Super League: Hull Kingston Rovers
Danny Galea	Penrith Panthers	N/A
Michael Gordon	Penrith Panthers	Cronulla-Sutherland Sharks
Michael Jennings	Penrith Panthers	Sydney Roosters
Luke Lewis	Penrith Panthers	Cronulla-Sutherland Sharks
Shane Shackleton	Penrith Panthers	Retirement
Etu Uaisele	Penrith Panthers	N/A
Dayne Weston	Penrith Panthers	Melbourne Storm
Scott Geddes	South Sydney Rabbitohs	Retirement
Eddy Pettybourne	South Sydney Rabbitohs	Wests Tigers
Fetuli Talanoa	South Sydney Rabbitohs	N/A
Dave Taylor	South Sydney Rabbitohs	Gold Coast Titans
David Gower	St. George Illawarra Dragons	Manly Warringah Sea Eagles
Ben Hornby	St. George Illawarra Dragons	Retirement
Jeremy Latimore	St. George Illawarra Dragons	Penrith Panthers
Josh Miller	St. George Illawarra Dragons	Retirement
Beau Scott	St. George Illawarra Dragons	Newcastle Knights
Dean Young	St. George Illawarra Dragons	Retirement
Braith Anasta	Sydney Roosters	Wests Tigers
Justin Carney	Sydney Roosters	Super League: Castleford Tigers
Joseph Leilua	Sydney Roosters	Newcastle Knights
Mose Masoe	Sydney Roosters	Penrith Panthers
Tom Symonds	Sydney Roosters	Manly Warringah Sea Eagles
Brad Takairangi	Sydney Roosters	Gold Coast Titans
Ray Cashmere	Wests Tigers	Retirement
Gareth Ellis	Wests Tigers	Super League: Hull F.C.
Chris Heighington	Wests Tigers	Cronulla-Sutherland Sharks
Junior Moors	Wests Tigers	Melbourne Storm
Beau Ryan	Wests Tigers	Cronulla-Sutherland Sharks
Tom Burgess	Super League: Bradford Bulls	South Sydney Rabbitohs
Clint Greenshields	Super League: Catalans Dragons	North Queensland Cowboys
David Fa'alogo	Super League: Huddersfield Giants	Newcastle Knights
Scott Moore	Super League: Huddersfield Giants	North Queensland Cowboys
Luke O'Donnell	Super League: Huddersfield Giants	Sydney Roosters
Sam Moa	Super League: Hull F.C.	Sydney Roosters
Brett Finch	Super League: Wigan Warriors	Melbourne Storm
Thomas Leuluai	Super League: Wigan Warriors	New Zealand Warriors
Jeff Lima	Super League: Wigan Warriors	South Sydney Rabbitohs
Sonny Bill Williams	Panasonic Wild Knights (Japanese Rugby Union)	Sydney Roosters
Lagi Setu	Hiatus	Melbourne Storm

=== Coaches ===
Coach	2012 Club	2013 Club
Mick Potter	Super League: Bradford Bulls	Wests Tigers
Trent Robinson	Super League: Catalans Dragons	Sydney Roosters
Ricky Stuart	New South Wales	Parramatta Eels
