= 2013 Parramatta Eels season =

Australia Rugby League Parramatta Eels 2013 season

- NRL Rank: 16th
- Play-off result: DNQ
- World Club Challenge: DNQ
- 2013 record: Wins: 5; draws: 0; losses: 18
- Points scored: For: 326; against: 740

Team information
- CEO: Matt Phelan (Interim); Scott Seward
- Coach: (Australia) Ricky Stuart
- Captain: (Australia) Reni Maitua (Australia) Jarryd Hayne (Lebanon) Tim Mannah
- Stadium: Parramatta Stadium (Capacity: 20,741); ANZ Stadium (Capacity: 83,500); Glen Willow Oval (Capacity: 10,000)
- Avg. attendance: 12,456 (Home); 14,319 (Home & Away)
- Agg. attendance: 149,470 (Home); 343,659 (Home & Away)
- High attendance: 25,068 (14 March vs Canterbury-Bankstown Bulldogs, Round 2)

Top scorers
- Tries: (Australia) Ken Sio (10)
- Goals: (Australia) Chris Sandow (35)
- Points: (Australia) Chris Sandow (74)
← 2012	List of seasons	2014 →

The 2013 Parramatta Eels season was the 67th in the club's history. Coached by Ricky Stuart and captained by Jarryd Hayne, Reni Maitua and Tim Mannah, they competed in the NRL's 2013 Telstra Premiership.

== Summary ==
Another wooden spoon followed in 2013, with the club suffering their second biggest loss ever (4–64 to Melbourne in Round 24), and conceding three other scores of 50 or more. On 12 September 2013 it was announced Ricky Stuart would leave the Eels to take up the head coaching role at Canberra for the 2014 season.

== Standings ==
=== National Rugby League ===
2013 NRL season
Pos	Team	Pld	W	D	L	B	PF	PA	PD	Pts
1	Sydney Roosters (P)	24	18	0	6	2	640	325	+315	40
2	South Sydney Rabbitohs	24	18	0	6	2	588	384	+204	40
3	Melbourne Storm	24	16	1	7	2	589	373	+216	37
4	Manly Warringah Sea Eagles	24	15	1	8	2	588	366	+222	35
5	Cronulla-Sutherland Sharks	24	14	0	10	2	468	460	+8	32
6	Canterbury-Bankstown Bulldogs	24	13	0	11	2	529	463	+66	30
7	Newcastle Knights	24	12	1	11	2	528	422	+106	29
8	North Queensland Cowboys	24	12	0	12	2	507	431	+76	28
9	Gold Coast Titans	24	11	0	13	2	500	518	−18	26
10	Penrith Panthers	24	11	0	13	2	495	532	−37	26
11	New Zealand Warriors	24	11	0	13	2	495	554	−59	26
12	Brisbane Broncos	24	10	1	13	2	434	477	−43	25
13	Canberra Raiders	24	10	0	14	2	434	624	−190	24
14	St. George Illawarra Dragons	24	7	0	17	2	379	530	−151	18
15	Wests Tigers	24	7	0	17	2	386	687	−301	18
16	Parramatta Eels	24	5	0	19	2	326	740	−414	14

=== National Youth Competition ===
2013 National Youth Competition season
Pos	Team	Pld	W	D	L	B	PF	PA	PD	Pts
1	Canberra Raiders	24	19	1	4	2	765	614	+151	43
2	Penrith Panthers (P)	24	17	0	7	2	689	460	+229	38
3	Sydney Roosters	24	17	0	7	2	711	554	+157	38
4	Canterbury-Bankstown Bulldogs	24	16	1	7	2	846	626	+220	37
5	Wests Tigers	24	14	0	10	2	687	564	+123	32
6	New Zealand Warriors	24	13	2	9	2	679	599	+80	32
7	South Sydney Rabbitohs	24	12	1	11	2	607	608	-1	29
8	Brisbane Broncos	24	12	0	12	2	660	740	-80	28
9	Melbourne Storm	24	11	0	13	2	558	564	-6	26
10	North Queensland Cowboys	24	9	2	13	2	582	615	-33	24
11	St. George-Illawarra Dragons	24	9	1	14	2	596	663	-67	23
12	Newcastle Knights	24	9	0	15	2	584	602	-18	22
13	Cronulla-Sutherland Sharks	24	8	1	15	2	516	667	-151	21
14	Parramatta Eels	24	7	2	15	2	570	726	-156	20
15	Gold Coast Titans	24	7	0	17	2	520	786	-266	18
16	Manly-Warringah Sea Eagles	24	6	1	17	2	560	742	-182	17

== Fixtures ==
=== Pre-season ===
Date	Opponent	Venue	Result	Score	Tries	Goals	Attendance	Report
2 February	Newcastle Knights	Bellevue Oval, Armidale	Win	46–10	Edwards (2), Kamuta (2), Gilbert (2), Maitua, Willieme, Wehbe	Pewhairangi 4, Wehbe 1	5,023	
16 February	Wests Tigers	Campbelltown Sports Stadium, Campbelltown	Loss	41–4	W. Tonga	Nil	N/A	
23 February	Penrith Panthers	Centrebet Stadium, Penrith	Draw	10–10	Hayne, Blair	Sandow 1	4,000	

=== Home and away season ===
Date	Round	Opponent	Venue	Result	Score	Tries	Goals	Attendance	Report
9 March	Round 1	New Zealand Warriors	Parramatta Stadium, Parramatta	Win	40–10	Hayne (3), Sio (2), Ryan, Sandow	Sandow 6/7	13,351	
14 March	Round 2	Canterbury Bankstown Bulldogs	ANZ Stadium, Sydney	Loss	16–20	Blair (2), Ryan	Sandow 2/3	25,068	
22 March	Round 3	Wests Tigers	Leichhardt Oval, Leichhardt	Loss	31–18	Loko, Morgan, Toutai	Sandow 3/3	18,326	
1 April	Round 4	Sydney Roosters	Allianz Stadium, Sydney	Loss	0–50	Nil	Nil	18,014	
6 April	Round 5	Cronulla Sutherland Sharks	Parramatta Stadium, Parramatta	Win	13–6	Morgan (2)	Sandow 2/3, Kelly FG: 1	11,063	
14 April	Round 6	Gold Coast Titans	Skilled Park, Robina	Loss	28–22	Hayne (2), Morgan	Sandow 5/5	12,027	
29 April	Round 7	Penrith Panthers	Centrebet Stadium, Penrith	Loss	44–12	Hayne, Toutai	Sandow 2/2	14,211	
4 May	Round 8	North Queensland Cowboys	Parramatta Stadium, Parramatta	Loss	10–14	Moimoi, Morgan	Sandow 1/3	9,157	
11 May	Round 9	Brisbane Broncos	Parramatta Stadium, Parramatta	Win	19–18	Hayne, Kelly, Paulo	Sandow 3/5, Hayne FG: 1	11,005	
18 May	Round 10	St George Illawarra Dragons	WIN Stadium, Wollongong	Loss	12–32	Terepo (2)	Sandow 2/2	17,458	
18 May	Round 11	Gold Coast Titans	Glen Willow Regional Sports Stadium, Mudgee	Loss	4–42	Sio	Sandow 0/1	9,132	
23–26 May	Round 12	Bye							
7 June	Round 13	Sydney Roosters	Parramatta Stadium, Parramatta	Loss	24–38	Hayne, Mullaney, Sio, Terepo	Sandow 4/4	12,135	
15 June	Round 14	Cronulla Sutherland Sharks	Shark Stadium, Cronulla	Loss	32–14	Williame, Terepo	Sandow 1/2	10,987	
13 July	Round 18	Penrith Panthers	Parramatta Stadium, Parramatta	Loss	10–17	Williame, Kelly	Mullaney 1/2	9,327	
20 July	Round 19	Canberra Raiders	Canberra Stadium, Canberra	Loss	14–0	Nil	Nil	7,023	
26 July	Round 20	Canterbury Bankstown Bulldogs	ANZ Stadium, Sydney	Loss	40–12	Roberts, Radradra	Mullaney 2/2	23,341	
3 August	Round 21	Manly Warringah Sea Eagles	Parramatta Stadium, Parramatta	Loss	6–40	Radradra	Mullaney 1/1	11,232	
9 August	Round 22	Wests Tigers	Parramatta Stadium, Parramatta	Win	26–22	Toutai (2), Sio, Mullaney, Paulo	Mullaney 1/3, Paulo 2/2	12,013	
16 August	Round 23	Brisbane Broncos	Suncorp Stadium, Brisbane	Loss	22–12	Morgan (2), Maitua	Mullaney 1/1, Paulo 1/1	24,607	
25 August	Round 24	Melbourne Storm	AAMI Park, Melbourne	Loss	64–4	Radradra	Mullaney 0/1	13,728	
2 September	Round 25	St George Illawarra Dragons	Parramatta Stadium, Parramatta	Win	26–22	Radradra (2), Moimoi (2), Sio	Paulo 2/4, Roberts 1/1	8,910	
8 September	Round 26	Newcastle Knights	Hunter Stadium, Newcastle	Loss	54–6	Sio	Paulo 1/1	23,392	

== Players and staff ==
Parramatta Eels
NRL Premiership Squad			Coaching staff
Mitchell Allgood – PR, SR; Cheyse Blair – CE, WG; Kenny Edwards – SR; Daniel Harrison – LK, SR; Jarryd Hayne (c) – FB; Matt Keating – HK; Luke Kelly – HB, FE; Taniela Lasalo – SR; Jacob Loko – CE, SR; Darcy Lussick – PR, SR; Lorenzo Ma'afu – SR, LK; Reni Maitua (c) – SR, PR	Tim Mannah (c) – PR; Fuifui Moimoi – PR; Ryan Morgan – CE; Jake Mullaney – FB, FE; Pat O'Hanlon – SR; Joseph Paulo – LK, SR; Junior Paulo – PR; Api Pewhairangi – FE, CE; Kaysa Pritchard – HK; Ben Roberts – FE; Matt Ryan – SR; Chris Sandow – HB	Ken Sio – WG; Ben Smith – SR, CE; Nathan Smith – HK; Kelepi Tanginoa – SR; Taulima Tautai – SR; Peni Terepo – PR; Willie Tonga – CE; Vai Toutai – CE; Brayden Wiliame – CE, WG	Head coach: Ricky Stuart; Assistant coach: Matt Parish; Legend: (c) Captain(s); (vc) Vice-captain(s); Injured; Updated: 6 January 2013; Source(s): Player profiles

Note: Junior Paulo, Kaysa Pritchard, Kelepi Tanginoa and Vai Toutai were still eligible to play in the Holden Cup for the 2013 season

== Transfers ==
In:

Nat.	Pos.	Name	From
(Australia)	SR	Daniel Harrison	Manly Warringah Sea Eagles
(Australia)	PR	Darcy Lussick	Manly Warringah Sea Eagles
(Australia)	HB	Luke Kelly	Melbourne Storm
(Fiji)	CE	Brayden Wiliame	Melbourne Storm
(Ireland)	SO	Api Pewhairangi	Newcastle Knights

Out:

Nat.	Pos.	Name	To
(Australia)		Marmin Barba	Gold Coast Titans
(Australia)		Jordan Atkins	Gold Coast Titans
(New Zealand)	SR	Justin Horo	Manly Warringah Sea Eagles
(Tonga)	CE	Esikeli Tonga	Manly Warringah Sea Eagles
(Australia)	CE	Jamil Hopoate	Manly Warringah Sea Eagles
(Australia)		Jason Seage	Manly Warringah Sea Eagles
(Australia)	PR	Justin Poore	Wakefield Trinity Wildcats
(Australia)	LF	Rory Brien	Wests Tigers

Retirees:

- Nathan Hindmarsh
- Luke Burt
- Casey McGuire

== Representative call ups ==
=== Domestic ===
Pos.	Player	Team	Call-up
FB	Jarryd Hayne	NRL All Stars	2013 NRL All Stars Match
FB	Jarryd Hayne	NSW	2013 State of Origin series

=== International ===
Pos.	Player	Team	Call-up
SO	Ben Roberts	Samoa	2013 Polynesian Cup
FB	Jarryd Hayne	Australia	2013 Rugby League World Cup
WG	Semi Radradra	Fiji	2013 Rugby League World Cup
SH	Api Pewhairangi	Ireland	2013 Rugby League World Cup
SO	Ben Roberts	Samoa	2013 Rugby League World Cup
LF	Reni Maitua	Samoa	2013 Rugby League World Cup
PR	Fuifui Moimoi	Tonga	2013 Rugby League World Cup
LF	Peni Terepo	Tonga	2013 Rugby League World Cup
HK	Dean Parata	Italy	2013 Rugby League World Cup
SO	Joseph Paulo	(United States) USA	2013 Rugby League World Cup
