= 2013 Cronulla-Sutherland Sharks season =

- NRL rank: 5th
- 2013 record: Wins: 14; losses: 10
- Points scored: For: 468; against: 460

Team information
- CEO: Steve Noyce
- Coach: Shane Flanagan
- Assistant coach: Peter Sharp
- Captains: Paul Gallen; Wade Graham
- Stadium: Remondis Stadium
- Avg. attendance: 13,442

Top scorers
- Tries: Andrew Fifita (9)
- Goals: Todd Carney (45)
- Points: Michael Gordon (112)
← 2012	2014 →

The 2013 Cronulla-Sutherland Sharks season is the 47th in the club's history. Coached by Shane Flanagan and captained by Paul Gallen, they competed in the NRL's 2013 Telstra Premiership. The Sharks finished the regular season 5th (out of 16), thus reaching the finals for a second consecutive season. They were then knocked out of contention in the second week of the finals by eventual grand finalists the Manly-Warringah Sea Eagles.

In May 2013, Glenn Coleman resigned as the Sharks' chairman of the board of directors. He was soon replaced by Damian Keogh.

== Ladder ==
2013 NRL season
Pos	Team	Pld	W	D	L	B	PF	PA	PD	Pts
1	Sydney Roosters (P)	24	18	0	6	2	640	325	+315	40
2	South Sydney Rabbitohs	24	18	0	6	2	588	384	+204	40
3	Melbourne Storm	24	16	1	7	2	589	373	+216	37
4	Manly Warringah Sea Eagles	24	15	1	8	2	588	366	+222	35
5	Cronulla-Sutherland Sharks	24	14	0	10	2	468	460	+8	32
6	Canterbury-Bankstown Bulldogs	24	13	0	11	2	529	463	+66	30
7	Newcastle Knights	24	12	1	11	2	528	422	+106	29
8	North Queensland Cowboys	24	12	0	12	2	507	431	+76	28
9	Gold Coast Titans	24	11	0	13	2	500	518	−18	26
10	Penrith Panthers	24	11	0	13	2	495	532	−37	26
11	New Zealand Warriors	24	11	0	13	2	495	554	−59	26
12	Brisbane Broncos	24	10	1	13	2	434	477	−43	25
13	Canberra Raiders	24	10	0	14	2	434	624	−190	24
14	St. George Illawarra Dragons	24	7	0	17	2	379	530	−151	18
15	Wests Tigers	24	7	0	17	2	386	687	−301	18
16	Parramatta Eels	24	5	0	19	2	326	740	−414	14

== Results ==
- Round 1 - Sharks vs Titans (12 - 10)

 Tries: Matthew Wright, Andrew Fifita

- Round 2 - Rabbitohs vs Sharks (14 - 12)

 Tries: Michael Gordon, Beau Ryan

- Round 3 - Sharks vs Warriors (28 - 4)

 Tries: John Morris, Michael Gordon, Beau Ryan, Sam Tagataese, Jeff Robson

- Round 4 - Sharks vs Dragons (12 - 25)

 Tries: Jeff Robson, Andrew Fifita

- Round 5 - Eels vs Sharks (13 - 6)

 Tries: Michael Gordon

- Round 6 - Sea Eagles vs Sharks (25 - 18)

 Tries: Nathan Stapleton (2), Stewart Mills

- Round 7 - Shark vs Bulldogs (8 - 24)

 Tries: Luke Lewis

- Round 8 - Knights vs Sharks (20 - 21)

 Tries: Jonathan Wright (2), Beau Ryan, Todd Carney
 Field Goal: Jeff Robson

- Round 9 - Tigers vs Sharks (6 - 30)

 Tries: Sosaia Feki (2), Andrew Fifita, Jeff Robson, Jayson Bukuya

- Round 10 - Sharks vs Raiders (30 - 20)

 Tries: Jonathan Wright, Ben Ross, Isaac De Gois, Jayson Bukuya, Andrew Fifita

- Round 11 - Sharks vs Rabbitohs (14 - 12)

 Tries: John Morris, Jayson Bukuya

- Round 12 - Bye
- Round 13 - Storm vs Sharks (38 - 6)

 Tries: Beau Ryan

- Round 14 - Sharks vs Eels (32 - 14)

 Tries: Jeff Robson (2), Paul Gallen, John Morris, Nathan Stapleton

- Round 15 - BYE
- Round 16 - Cowboys vs Sharks (24 - 4)

 Tries: Luke Lewis

- Round 17 - Sharks vs Tigers (36 - 22)

 Tries: Andrew Fifita (2), Wade Graham, Nathan Stapleton, Luke Lewis, Jayson Bukuya

- Round 18 - Broncos vs Sharks (18 - 19)

 Tries: Michael Gordon, Jayson Bukuya, Sosaia Feki
 Field Goal: Todd Carney

- Round 19 - Roosters vs Sharks (40 - 0)

 Tries: No Tries

- Round 20 - Sharks vs Panthers (38 - 10)

 Tries: Michael Gordon (2), Sosaia Feki (2), Todd Carney, Ben Pomeroy

- Round 21 - Warriors vs Sharks (14 - 18)

 Tries: Jonathan Wright, Ben Pomeroy, Nathan Stapleton

- Round 22 - Sharks vs Knights (14 - 18)

 Tries: Andrew Fifita, Wade Graham

- Round 23 - Dragons vs Sharks (18 - 22)

 Tries: Ben Pomeroy, Isaac De Gois, Beau Ryan, Andrew Fifita

- Round 24 - Sharks vs Roosters (32 - 22)

 Tries: Paul Gallen, Michael Gordon, Jonathan Wright, Chris Heighington

- Round 25 - Sharks vs Cowboys (18 - 31)

 Tries: Jayson Bukuya (2), Jeff Robson

- Round 26 - Raiders vs Sharks (18 - 38)

 Tries: Sosaia Feki, Luke Lewis, Jeff Robson, Tyrone Peachey, Bryce Gibbs, Beau Ryan

- Week 1 Finals - Sharks vs Cowboys (20 - 18)

 Tries: Beau Ryan, Ben Pomeroy, Sam Tagataese, Sosaia Feki

- Week 2 Finals - Sea Eagles vs Sharks (24 - 18)

 Tries: Michael Gordon, Andrew Fifita, Jonathan Wright

== Team Stats ==
- Most Points - Michael Gordon (112)
- Most Tries - Andrew Fifita (9)
- Most Try Assists - Todd Carney (21)
- Most Offloads - Anthony Tupou (40)
- Most Linebreaks - Michael Gordon (14)
- Most Tackles - Andrew Fifita (781)
- Most Runs - Andrew Fifita (436)
- Most Run Metres - Andrew Fifita (3777)
- Most Kick Metres - Todd Carney (6669)
- Most Tackle Busts - Andrew Fifita (114)
- Most Errors - Todd Carney (25)
- Most Linebreak Assists - Todd Carney (14)
