= 2013 Canberra Raiders season =

The 2013 Canberra Raiders season was the 32nd in the history of the Canberra Raiders. Coached by David Furner and then Andrew Dunemann, and captained by Terry Campese, the club competed in the National Rugby League's 2013 Telstra Premiership, finishing the regular season 13th (out of 16 teams) and thus failing to make the finals.

The Canberra Raiders started the 2013 NRL season with what was considered especially strong young talent.

After the loss to the Bulldogs in Round 23, Canberra's coach David Furner was sacked amidst rumours of player dissatisfaction.

The club's top try scorer in 2013 was Blake Ferguson, and their top point scorer was Jarrod Croker. The 2013 season's Mal Meninga Medal for player of the season was awarded to Anthony Milford.

== Ladder ==
2013 NRL season
| Pos | Team | Pld | W | D | L | B | PF | PA | PD | Pts |
|---|---|---|---|---|---|---|---|---|---|---|
| 1 | Sydney Roosters (P) | 24 | 18 | 0 | 6 | 2 | 640 | 325 | +315 | 40 |
| 2 | South Sydney Rabbitohs | 24 | 18 | 0 | 6 | 2 | 588 | 384 | +204 | 40 |
| 3 | Melbourne Storm | 24 | 16 | 1 | 7 | 2 | 589 | 373 | +216 | 37 |
| 4 | Manly Warringah Sea Eagles | 24 | 15 | 1 | 8 | 2 | 588 | 366 | +222 | 35 |
| 5 | Cronulla-Sutherland Sharks | 24 | 14 | 0 | 10 | 2 | 468 | 460 | +8 | 32 |
| 6 | Canterbury-Bankstown Bulldogs | 24 | 13 | 0 | 11 | 2 | 529 | 463 | +66 | 30 |
| 7 | Newcastle Knights | 24 | 12 | 1 | 11 | 2 | 528 | 422 | +106 | 29 |
| 8 | North Queensland Cowboys | 24 | 12 | 0 | 12 | 2 | 507 | 431 | +76 | 28 |
| 9 | Gold Coast Titans | 24 | 11 | 0 | 13 | 2 | 500 | 518 | −18 | 26 |
| 10 | Penrith Panthers | 24 | 11 | 0 | 13 | 2 | 495 | 532 | −37 | 26 |
| 11 | New Zealand Warriors | 24 | 11 | 0 | 13 | 2 | 495 | 554 | −59 | 26 |
| 12 | Brisbane Broncos | 24 | 10 | 1 | 13 | 2 | 434 | 477 | −43 | 25 |
| 13 | Canberra Raiders | 24 | 10 | 0 | 14 | 2 | 434 | 624 | −190 | 24 |
| 14 | St. George Illawarra Dragons | 24 | 7 | 0 | 17 | 2 | 379 | 530 | −151 | 18 |
| 15 | Wests Tigers | 24 | 7 | 0 | 17 | 2 | 386 | 687 | −301 | 18 |
| 16 | Parramatta Eels | 24 | 5 | 0 | 19 | 2 | 326 | 740 | −414 | 14 |
