= 2013 Brisbane Broncos season =

Coordinates: 27°27′53″S 153°0′34″E

- NRL rank: 12th
- Play-off result: Did not qualify for finals
- 2012 record: Wins: 10; draws: 1; losses: 13
- Points scored: For: 434; against: 477

Team information
- CEO: Paul White
- Coach: Anthony Griffin
- Captains: Sam Thaiday; Alex Glenn (Fill-in)
- Stadium: Suncorp Stadium
- Avg. attendance: 30,480
- Agg. attendance: 365,754
- High attendance: 42,556, (North Queensland Cowboys, 12 April)
- Low attendance: 21,259, (New Zealand Warriors, 3 June)

Top scorers
- Tries: Josh Hoffman (15)
- Goals: Scott Prince (52)
- Points: Scott Prince (120)
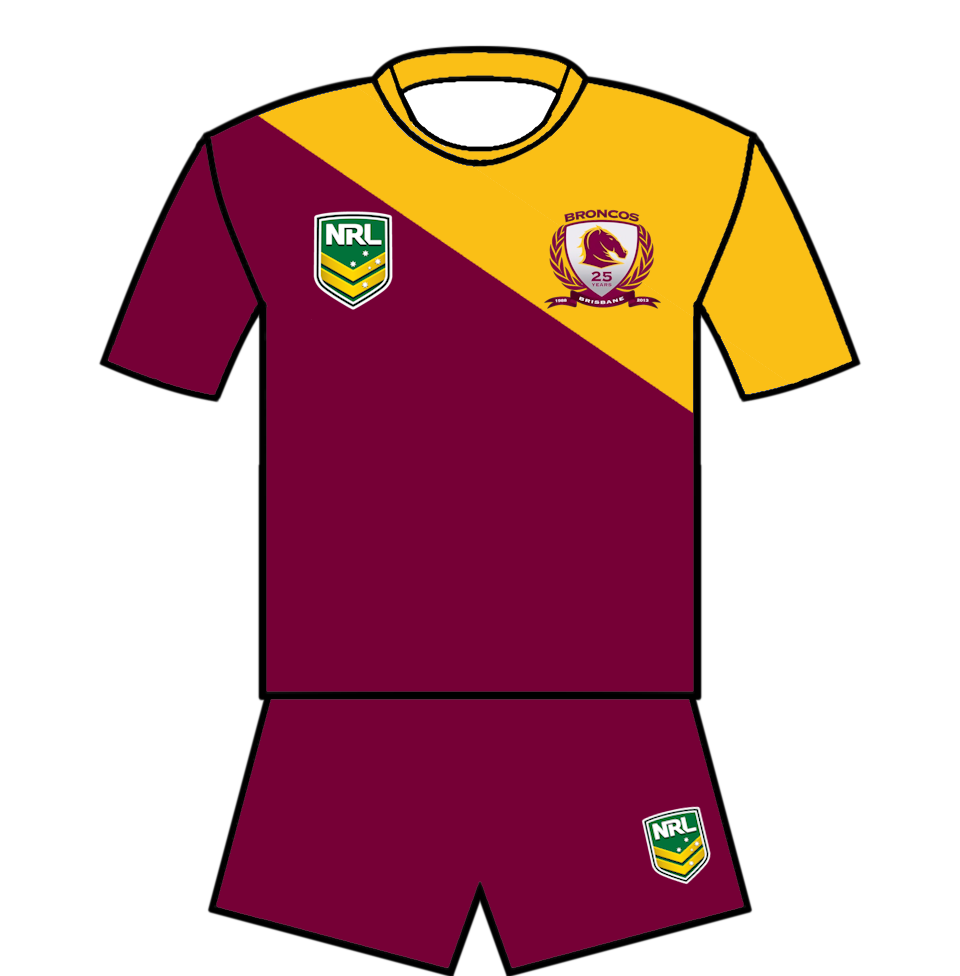
Home colours
← 2012	List of seasons	2014 →

The 2013 Brisbane Broncos season was the 26th in the club's history. Based in Brisbane, Queensland, Australia, the team was coached by Anthony Griffin and captained by Sam Thaiday, they competed in the NRL's 2013 Telstra Premiership. Brisbane finished the regular season in 12th (out of 16), thus failing to qualify for the finals for the first time since 2010.

According to a 2013 report, the Brisbane Broncos had the highest brand equity of any Australian sporting brand.

== Season summary ==
=== Milestones ===
- Round 1: Jack Reed played his 50th career game.
- Round 2: Alex Glenn played his 100th career game.
- Round 4: Jordan Kahu made his first grade debut.
- Round 4: Corey Norman played his 50th career game.
- Round 9: Jordan Kahu scored his 1st career try.
- Round 10: Jake Granville made his first grade debut.
- Round 12: Mitchell Dodds played his 50th career game.
- Round 13: Mitchell Dodds scored his 1st career try.
- Round 13: Justin Hodges played his 150th game for the club.
- Round 14: Scott Prince scored his 1000th career point.
- Round 16: Peter Wallace played his 150th career game.
- Round 17: Corey Oates made his first grade debut.
- Round 18: Corey Oates scored his 1st career try.
- Round 18: Scott Anderson played his 50th career game.
- Round 20: David Stagg played his 100th game for the club.
- Round 22: Jordan Drew made his first grade debut and scored his 1st career try.
- Round 24: Corey Parker played his 275th game for the club which moved him into second place on the Broncos' all-time games list only behind Darren Lockyer (355).
- Round 26: Scott Prince played his 300th career game and his 50th game for the club.
- Round 26: David Stagg played his 200th career game.

== Squad list ==
As of 5 September 2013

Cap.	Nat.	Player	Position	First Broncos game	Previous First Grade RL club
100	(Australia)	Justin Hodges	Centre	2000	(Australia) Sydney Roosters
105	(Australia)	Scott Prince	Five-eighth	2001	(Australia) North Queensland Cowboys
106	(Australia)	Corey Parker	Lock	2001	—N/a
127	(Australia)	David Stagg	Second-row	2003	(Australia) Canterbury-Bankstown Bulldogs
128	(Australia)	Sam Thaiday (c)	Prop	2003	—N/a
144	(Australia)	Ben Hannant	Prop	2006	(Australia) Canterbury-Bankstown Bulldogs
153	(Australia)	Denan Kemp	Wing	2007	New Zealand Warriors
158	(Australia)	Peter Wallace	Halfback	2008	(Australia) Penrith Panthers
163	(Australia)	Andrew McCullough	Hooker	2008	—N/a
165	(New Zealand)	Josh Hoffman	Wing	2008	—N/a
169	(Australia)	Jharal Yow Yeh	Wing	2009	—N/a
172	(New Zealand)	Alex Glenn	Second-row	2009	—N/a
174	(Australia)	Josh McGuire	Prop	2009	—N/a
177	(Australia)	Dale Copley	Centre	2009	—N/a
178	(Australia)	Ben Hunt	Halfback	2009	—N/a
180	(Tonga)	David Hala	Prop	2009	—N/a
181	(Australia)	Scott Anderson	Prop	2010	(Australia) Melbourne Storm
182	(Australia)	Matt Gillett	Second-row	2010	—N/a
183	(Australia)	Mitchell Dodds	Prop	2010	—N/a
184	(Australia)	Corey Norman	Fullback	2010	—N/a
186	(Samoa)	Dunamis Lui	Prop	2010	—N/a
190	(England)	Jack Reed	Centre	2011	—N/a
191	(Papua New Guinea)	Kurt Baptiste	Hooker	2011	—N/a
193	(Australia)	Nick Slyney	Second-row	2012	(Australia) North Queensland Cowboys
195	(Australia)	Lachlan Maranta	Wing	2012	—N/a
196	(Australia)	Jarrod Wallace	Prop	2012	—N/a
197	(Australia)	Brendon Gibb	Second-row	2012	—N/a
198	(Australia)	Aaron Whitchurch	Wing	2012	—N/a
199	(New Zealand)	Jordan Kahu	Wing	2013	—N/a
200	(Australia)	Jake Granville	Hooker	2013	—N/a
201	(Australia)	Corey Oates	Wing	2013	—N/a
202	(Australia)	Lama Tasi	Prop	2013	(Australia) Sydney Roosters
203	(Australia)	Jordan Drew	Wing	2013	—N/a
–	(Australia)	Delroy Berryman	Wing	Yet to debut	—N/a
–	(Australia)	Joe Bond	Fullback	Yet to debut	—N/a
–	(Australia)	Cameron Cullen	Halfback	Yet to debut	—N/a
–	(Australia)	Luke Dalziel-Don	Second-row	Yet to debut	—N/a
–	(Australia)	Liam Georgetown	Wing	Yet to debut	(Australia) Penrith Panthers
–	(Australia)	Chris McLean	Second-row	Yet to debut	—N/a
–	(Cook Islands)	Francis Molo	Prop	Yet to debut	—N/a
–	(Australia)	Caleb Timu	Second-row	Yet to debut	—N/a

== Squad changes ==
=== Transfers in ===
Date	Position	Player	From	Year/s	Ref.
19 September 2012	Fullback	Joe Bond	Redcliffe Dolphins	1 Year	
14 October 2012	Fullback	Jake Granville	Wynnum Seagulls	1 Year	
31 October 2012	Five-eighth	Scott Prince	Gold Coast Titans	2 Years	
3 November 2012	Second-row	David Stagg	Canterbury-Bankstown Bulldogs	2 Years	
18 January 2013	Wing	Denan Kemp	St George Illawarra Dragons	1 Year	
29 June 2013	Prop	Lama Tasi	Sydney Roosters	End of season	

=== Transfers out ===
Date	Position	Player	To	Year/s	Ref.
3 April 2012	Fullback	Gerard Beale	St. George Illawarra Dragons	3 Years	
2 May 2012	Second-row	Ben Te'o	South Sydney Rabbitohs	3 Years	
8 May 2012	Prop	Petero Civoniceva	Retirement	—N/a	
13 November 2012	Second-row	Mitchell Frei	Newcastle Knights	1 Years	
24 May 2013	Fullback	Luke Capewell	Penrith Panthers	1 & 1/2 Years	

=== Re-signings ===
Player	Club	Until end of	Ref.
Matt Gillett	Brisbane Broncos	2016	
Jake Granville	Brisbane Broncos	2014	
Ben Hunt	Brisbane Broncos	2015	
Jordan Kahu	Brisbane Broncos	2015	
Corey Oates	Brisbane Broncos	2015	
Jack Reed	Brisbane Broncos	2017	

=== Contract lengths ===
Player	2013	2014	2015	2016	2017	Source
Scott Anderson	Brisbane Broncos	Wakefield Trinity Wildcats				
Kurt Baptiste	Brisbane Broncos	Canberra Raiders				
Corey Norman	Brisbane Broncos	Parramatta Eels				
Scott Prince	Brisbane Broncos	Retirement				
Lama Tasi	Brisbane Broncos	Salford Red Devils				
Peter Wallace	Brisbane Broncos	Penrith Panthers				
Joe Bond	Brisbane Broncos					
Dale Copley	Brisbane Broncos					
Dunamis Lui	Brisbane Broncos					
Nick Slyney	Brisbane Broncos	London Broncos				
Jake Granville	Brisbane Broncos					
David Hala	Brisbane Broncos					
Ben Hannant	Brisbane Broncos					
Justin Hodges	Brisbane Broncos					
Corey Parker	Brisbane Broncos					
David Stagg	Brisbane Broncos					
Alex Glenn	Brisbane Broncos					
Anthony Griffin (Coach)	Brisbane Broncos					
Josh Hoffman	Brisbane Broncos					
Ben Hunt	Brisbane Broncos					
Jordan Kahu	Brisbane Broncos					
Andrew McCullough	Brisbane Broncos					
Josh McGuire	Brisbane Broncos					
Corey Oates	Brisbane Broncos					
Sam Thaiday	Brisbane Broncos					
Jharal Yow Yeh	Brisbane Broncos					
Matt Gillett	Brisbane Broncos					
Jack Reed	Brisbane Broncos					

== Coaching staff ==
Role	Name	Ref.
Head coach	Anthony Griffin	
Assistant Coach	Stephen Kearney	
Assistant Coach	Kristian Woolf	
Athletic Performance Coach	Tony Guilfoyle	
Athletic Performance Coach	Andrew Croll	
Strength Coach	Dan Baker	
General Manager – Football Operations	Andrew Gee	
NRL Welfare Manager, NYC Team Manager	Scot Czislowski	
NYC Coach	Craig Hodges	

== Fixtures ==
=== Pre-season ===
Date	Round	Opponent	Venue	Score	Tries	Goals	Attendance
Saturday, 9 February	Trial 1	North Queensland Cowboys	Alex Inch Oval	24 – 28	Maranta, Capewell, Hunt, Berryman, Kemp	Berryman (2)	4,000
Saturday, 16 February	Trial 2	Gold Coast Titans	Dolphin Oval	14 – 16	Hoffman, Norman, Kemp	Prince (1)	4,510
Saturday, 23 February	Trial 3	New Zealand Warriors	Forsyth Barr Stadium	10 – 16	Maranta, Hodges	Prince (1)	15,000
Legend: Win Loss Draw

=== Regular season ===
Date	Round	Opponent	Venue	Score	Tries	Goals	Attendance
Friday, 8 March	Round 1	Manly-Warringah Sea Eagles	Suncorp Stadium	14 – 22	Gillett, Maranta	Prince (3/3)	31,139
Friday, 15 March	Round 2	St. George Illawarra Dragons	WIN Stadium	22 – 6	Hannant, Hoffman, Stagg, Norman	Prince (3/4)	13,156
Saturday, 23 March	Round 3	Sydney Roosters	Allianz Stadium	0 – 8			13,168
Friday, 29 March	Round 4	Melbourne Storm	Suncorp Stadium	26 – 32	Hoffman (3), Reed, Glenn	Prince (3/5)	40,071
Friday, 5 April	Round 5	Gold Coast Titans	Skilled Park	32 – 12	P. Wallace, Hoffman, Gillett, Hodges, McCullough, Slyney	Prince (4/6)	22,749
Friday, 12 April	Round 6	North Queensland Cowboys	Suncorp Stadium	12 – 10	Hoffman (2), Maranta	Prince (0/3)	42,556
Saturday, 27 April	Round 7	Wests Tigers	Campbelltown Stadium	20 – 10	Gillett (2), Norman, Hodges	Prince (1/3), Parker (1/2)	11,547
Friday, 3 May	Round 8	South Sydney Rabbitohs	Suncorp Stadium	12 – 26	Prince, Reed	Prince (2/2)	39,111
Saturday, 11 May	Round 9	Parramatta Eels	Parramatta Stadium	18 – 19	Kahu (2), Hodges, Hunt	P. Wallace (1/2), Parker (0/2)	11,005
Friday, 17 May	Round 10	Gold Coast Titans	Suncorp Stadium	32 – 6	Hoffman, Thaiday, Reed, Maranta	Parker (8/8)	34,596
Friday, 24 May	Round 11	Canterbury-Bankstown Bulldogs	ANZ Stadium	14 – 24	Hoffman, Kahu, Maranta	Parker (1/3)	11,344
Monday, 3 June	Round 12	New Zealand Warriors	Suncorp Stadium	18 – 56	Hoffman, Glenn, Prince	Prince (3/4)	21,259
Monday, 10 June	Round 13	Canberra Raiders	Canberra Stadium	18 – 30	Prince, Gillett, Dodds	Prince (3/3)	10,419
Monday, 17 June	Round 14	Wests Tigers	Suncorp Stadium	32 – 12	Hoffman (2), Gillett, Reed, Hodges, Prince	Prince (4/7)	21,339
	Round 15	Bye					
Sunday, 30 June	Round 16	New Zealand Warriors	Mt Smart Stadium	16 – 18	Maranta, P. Wallace, Hoffman	Prince (2/3)	15,515
Friday, 5 July	Round 17	Melbourne Storm	AAMI Park	0 – 32			16,828
Friday, 12 July	Round 18	Cronulla-Sutherland Sharks	Suncorp Stadium	18 – 19	Hoffman, Oates, Kahu	Prince (3/3)	25,677
	Round 19	Bye					
Friday, 26 July	Round 20	North Queensland Cowboys	1300SMILES Stadium	18 – 16	Hunt, Oates, Hodges	Prince (3/3)	17,702
Friday, 2 August	Round 21	Newcastle Knights	Hunter Stadium	18 – 18	Hodges, Parker, Reed	Prince (3/3)	16,486
Sunday, 11 August	Round 22	St. George Illawarra Dragons	Suncorp Stadium	26 – 24	Drew, Gillett, Thaiday, McCullough	Prince (5/5)	31,199
Friday, 16 August	Round 23	Parramatta Eels	Suncorp Stadium	22 – 12	McGuire, Oates, Hoffman, Reed	Prince (3/4)	24,607
Friday, 23 August	Round 24	Penrith Panthers	Centrebet Stadium	12 – 28	Oates (2)	Prince (2/2)	8,817
Friday, 30 August	Round 25	Newcastle Knights	Suncorp Stadium	18 – 26	Parker, McCulough, Oates	Prince (3/4)	27,601
Thursday, 5 September	Round 26	Canterbury-Bankstown Bulldogs	Suncorp Stadium	16 – 11	Oates (2), Reed	Prince (2/3)	26,599
Legend: Win Loss Draw Bye

== Ladder ==
2013 NRL season
Pos	Team	Pld	W	D	L	B	PF	PA	PD	Pts
1	Sydney Roosters (P)	24	18	0	6	2	640	325	+315	40
2	South Sydney Rabbitohs	24	18	0	6	2	588	384	+204	40
3	Melbourne Storm	24	16	1	7	2	589	373	+216	37
4	Manly Warringah Sea Eagles	24	15	1	8	2	588	366	+222	35
5	Cronulla-Sutherland Sharks	24	14	0	10	2	468	460	+8	32
6	Canterbury-Bankstown Bulldogs	24	13	0	11	2	529	463	+66	30
7	Newcastle Knights	24	12	1	11	2	528	422	+106	29
8	North Queensland Cowboys	24	12	0	12	2	507	431	+76	28
9	Gold Coast Titans	24	11	0	13	2	500	518	−18	26
10	Penrith Panthers	24	11	0	13	2	495	532	−37	26
11	New Zealand Warriors	24	11	0	13	2	495	554	−59	26
12	Brisbane Broncos	24	10	1	13	2	434	477	−43	25
13	Canberra Raiders	24	10	0	14	2	434	624	−190	24
14	St. George Illawarra Dragons	24	7	0	17	2	379	530	−151	18
15	Wests Tigers	24	7	0	17	2	386	687	−301	18
16	Parramatta Eels	24	5	0	19	2	326	740	−414	14

== Statistics ==
Name	App	T	G	FG	Pts
Scott Anderson	11	0	0	0	0
Mitchell Dodds	11	1	0	0	4
Jordan Drew	1	1	0	0	4
Matt Gillett	22	7	0	0	28
Alex Glenn	20	2	0	0	8
Jake Granville	2	0	0	0	0
David Hala	13	0	0	0	0
Ben Hannant	16	1	0	0	4
Justin Hodges	14	6	0	0	24
Josh Hoffman	24	15	0	0	60
Ben Hunt	23	2	0	0	8
Jordan Kahu	10	4	0	0	16
Dunamis Lui	13	0	0	0	0
Lachlan Maranta	18	5	0	0	20
Andrew McCullough	24	3	0	0	12
Josh McGuire	19	1	0	0	4
Corey Norman	17	2	0	0	8
Corey Oates	9	8	0	0	32
Corey Parker	22	2	10	0	28
Scott Prince	22	4	52	0	120
Jack Reed	21	7	0	0	28
Nick Slyney	3	1	0	0	4
David Stagg	14	1	0	0	4
Lama Tasi	7	0	0	0	0
Sam Thaiday	21	2	0	0	8
Jarrod Wallace	6	0	0	0	0
Peter Wallace	24	2	1	0	10
Aaron Whitchurch	1	0	0	0	0
Totals		77	63	0	434

== Representative honours ==
This table lists all players who played a representative match in 2013.

Player	All Stars	City v Country	Anzac Test	State of Origin 1	State of Origin 2	State of Origin 3	World Cup
Ben Hannant	NRL	—N/a	–	–	–	–	–
Matt Gillett	–	—N/a	–	Queensland	Queensland	Queensland	–
Alex Glenn	–	—N/a	New Zealand	–	–	–	New Zealand
Justin Hodges	Indigenous	—N/a	Australia	Queensland	Queensland	Queensland	–
Josh Hoffman	–	—N/a	New Zealand	–	–	–	New Zealand
Corey Parker	–	—N/a	–	Queensland	Queensland	Queensland	Australia
Scott Prince	Indigenous	—N/a	–	–	–	–	–
Sam Thaiday (c)	–	—N/a	Australia	Queensland	Queensland	Queensland	Australia
Peter Wallace	–	–	–	–	–	–	Scotland

== Awards ==
=== League ===
- Nil

=== Club ===
- Paul Morgan Medal: Corey Parker
- Players’ Player: Corey Parker
- Rookie of the Year: Corey Oates
- Best Back: Josh Hoffman
- Best Forward: Corey Parker
- Most Consistent: Corey Parker
- Play of the Year: Jack Reed
- Fan Player of the Year: Josh Hoffman
- Clubman of the Year: Jharal Yow Yeh
- NYC Player of the Year: Stephen Coombe
- NYC Players’ Player: Ajuma Adams
- NYC Best Back: Kodi Nikorima
- NYC Best Forward: Francis Molo

=== RLIF Awards ===
- Lock of the Year: Corey Parker
