= 2013 North Queensland Cowboys season =

19th season in the club history

Coordinates: 19°18′58″S 146°42′43″E

- NRL Rank: 8th
- Play-off result: Lost Qualifying Final (v Cronulla Sharks, 18-20)
- 2013 record: Wins: 12; draws: 0; losses: 12
- Points scored: For: 507; against: 431

Team information
- CEO: Peter Jourdain
- Coach: Neil Henry
- Captain: Johnathan Thurston Matthew Scott
- Stadium: 1300SMILES Stadium
- Avg. attendance: 14,112
- High attendance: 19.510 (vs. Wests Tigers, Round 26)

Top scorers
- Tries: Antonio Winterstein (13)
- Goals: Johnathan Thurston (71)
- Points: Johnathan Thurston (151)
← 2012	2014 →

The 2013 North Queensland Cowboys season was the 19th in the club's history. Coached by Neil Henry and co-captained by Johnathan Thurston and Matthew Scott, they competed in the NRL's 2013 Telstra Premiership. The Cowboys finished the season in 8th place and were knocked out in the first week of the finals by the Cronulla Sharks.

== Season summary ==
The Cowboys entered the 2013 NRL season with high expectations and without their long time hooker and club legend Aaron Payne, who retired at the end of 2012. The side won their Round 1 game against the Canterbury Bulldogs but would only win five of their next 19 games, leaving them sitting in 15th place after 20 rounds. Tragedy struck the club on 29 April, when talented rookie Alex Elisala died at age 20. The Cowboys defeated the Parramatta Eels five days later, dedicating the game and the rest of the season to Elisala.

On 29 July, coach Neil Henry had his contract terminated after re-signing until the end of 2014 in March. Henry stayed on as head coach until the end of 2013, as the Cowboys went on a six-game winning streak to finish in 8th place and qualify for the finals series. They were defeated 20–18 by the Cronulla Sharks in week 1 of the finals, in a game in which the Sharks scored a try on the 7th tackle of a set.

On 1 October the club appointed former player Paul Green as their head coach for the 2014 and 2015 seasons.

At the end of the season, the Cowboys' had 13 players selected for the 2013 Rugby League World Cup.

=== Milestones ===
- Round 1: Ashton Sims played his 50th game for the club.
- Round 1: Rory Kostjasyn and Scott Moore made their debuts for the club.
- Round 2: Ray Thompson played his 50th game for the club.
- Round 3: Ashley Graham played his 150th game for the club.
- Round 3: Johnathan Thurston played his 200th NRL game.
- Round 4: Glenn Hall played his 50th game for the club.
- Round 6: Clint Greenshields made his debut for the club.
- Round 7: Brent Tate played his 200th NRL game.
- Round 9: Matthew Scott played his 150th game for the club.
- Round 10: Glenn Hall played his 150th NRL game.
- Round 12: Ethan Lowe made his NRL debut.
- Round 17: Antonio Winterstein played his 50th game for the club.
- Round 17: Scott Bolton played his 100th game for the club.
- Round 21: Kyle Feldt made his NRL debut.
- Round 21: Ashton Sims played his 200th NRL game.
- Round 22: Brent Tate played his 50th game for the club.
- Round 24: Wayne Ulugia made his NRL debut.
- Round 25: Jayden Hodges made his NRL debut.
- Finals Week 1: Tariq Sims played his 50th game for the club.
- Finals Week 1: James Tamou played his 100th NRL game.

== Squad List ==
North Queensland Cowboys NRL Squad 2013
First team squad			Coaching staff
Scott Bolton – SR; Matthew Bowen – FB; Gavin Cooper – SR; Alex Elisala – HK; Kalifa Faifai Loa – WG; Kyle Feldt – WG; Ashley Graham – WG; Clint Greenshields – FB; Chris Grevsmuhl – LK; Glenn Hall – SR; Sam Hoare – PR; Dallas Johnson – LK	Felise Kaufusi – PR; Rory Kostjasyn – HK; Blake Leary – SR; Kane Linnett – CE; Ethan Lowe – SR; Robert Lui – HB; Tyson Martin – SR; Anthony Mitchell – HK; Scott Moore – HK; Michael Morgan – FE; Joel Riethmuller – LK, SR; Curtis Rona – CE	Matthew Scott (c) – PR; Ashton Sims – PR; Tariq Sims – PR; James Tamou – PR; Brent Tate – CE; Jason Taumalolo – SR; Ray Thompson – FE; Ricky Thorby – SR; Johnathan Thurston (c) – HB; Wayne Ulugia – FB; Antonio Winterstein – WG	Head coach: Neil Henry; Assistant coaches: Terry Matterson (assistant coach); Peter Ryan (assistant coach); Paul Bowman (High Performance Manager); Glen Murphy (head conditioner); Steve Hooper (strength & conditioning coach); Steve Sartori (physiotherapist); Legend: (c) Captain(s); (vc) Vice-captain(s)

== Squad Movement ==
=== 2013 Gains ===
Player	Signed from	Until end of
Clint Greenshields	Catalans Dragons	2013
Rory Kostjasyn	Melbourne Storm	2014
Ethan Lowe	Northern Pride	2013
Scott Moore	Huddersfield Giants	2014
Curtis Rona	Sydney Roosters	2014

=== 2013 Losses ===
Player	Signed To	Until end of
Luke Harlen	Released	-
Dane Hogan	Easts Tigers	2014
Ben Jones	Newtown Jets	2013
Aaron Payne	Retired	-
Cory Paterson	Hull Kingston Rovers	2014
Mosese Pangai	Penrith Panthers	2014
James Segeyaro	Penrith Panthers	2015

== Ladder ==
2013 NRL season
Pos	Team	Pld	W	D	L	B	PF	PA	PD	Pts
1	Sydney Roosters (P)	24	18	0	6	2	640	325	+315	40
2	South Sydney Rabbitohs	24	18	0	6	2	588	384	+204	40
3	Melbourne Storm	24	16	1	7	2	589	373	+216	37
4	Manly Warringah Sea Eagles	24	15	1	8	2	588	366	+222	35
5	Cronulla-Sutherland Sharks	24	14	0	10	2	468	460	+8	32
6	Canterbury-Bankstown Bulldogs	24	13	0	11	2	529	463	+66	30
7	Newcastle Knights	24	12	1	11	2	528	422	+106	29
8	North Queensland Cowboys	24	12	0	12	2	507	431	+76	28
9	Gold Coast Titans	24	11	0	13	2	500	518	−18	26
10	Penrith Panthers	24	11	0	13	2	495	532	−37	26
11	New Zealand Warriors	24	11	0	13	2	495	554	−59	26
12	Brisbane Broncos	24	10	1	13	2	434	477	−43	25
13	Canberra Raiders	24	10	0	14	2	434	624	−190	24
14	St. George Illawarra Dragons	24	7	0	17	2	379	530	−151	18
15	Wests Tigers	24	7	0	17	2	386	687	−301	18
16	Parramatta Eels	24	5	0	19	2	326	740	−414	14

== Fixtures ==
=== Pre-season ===
Date	Round	Opponent	Venue	Score	Tries	Goals	Attendance
9 February	Trial 1	Brisbane Broncos	Alex Inch Oval	28 – 24	Leary, Morgan, Munns, Thorby, Ulugia	Feldt (2), Faifai Loa (1), Lowe (1)	4,000
16 February	Trial 2	St George Illawarra Dragons	Barlow Park	28 – 22	J Bowen, Greenshields, Morgan, Riethmuller, Taumalolo	Morgan (3), Feldt (1)	-
23 February	Trial 3	Gold Coast Titans	Virgin Australia Stadium	10 – 28	Faifai Loa, A Sims	Lui (1)	-
Legend: Win Loss Draw

=== Regular season ===
Date	Round	Opponent	Venue	Score	Tries	Goals	Attendance
25 March	Round 1	Canterbury Bulldogs	Central Coast Stadium	24 – 12	Graham (2), Cooper, Winterstein	Thurston (4/6)	11,627
16 March	Round 2	Melbourne Storm	1300SMILES Stadium	10 – 32	Graham, Linnett	Thurston (1/2)	19,288
25 March	Round 3	Newcastle Knights	Hunter Stadium	6 – 34	Cooper	Thurston (1/1)	15,758
1 April	Round 4	Warriors	Mt Smart Stadium	18 – 20	Faifai Loa, Tate, Winterstein	Thurston (3/4)	10,572
5 April	Round 5	Penrith Panthers	1300SMILES Stadium	30 – 0	Linnett (2), Faifai Loa, Lui, Winterstein	Thurston (5/6)	12,341
12 April	Round 6	Brisbane Broncos	Suncorp Stadium	10 – 12	Graham, Greenshields	Thurston (1/2)	42,556
27 April	Round 7	Canberra Raiders	1300SMILES Stadium	30 – 12	Bowen, Graham, Hall, Morgan, Tate	Thurston (5/7)	13,240
4 May	Round 8	Parramatta Eels	Parramatta Stadium	14 – 10	Graham, Tate, Winterstein	Thurston (1/3)	9,157
10 May	Round 9	South Sydney Rabbitohs	ANZ Stadium	10 – 28	Winterstein (2)	Thurston (1/2)	15,972
18 May	Round 10	Sydney Roosters	1300SMILES Stadium	8 – 12	Lui	Thurston (2/3)	13,666
24 May	Round 11	Wests Tigers	Leichhardt Stadium	20 – 22	Sims (2), Linnett, Winterstein	Thurston (2/4)	7,125
2 June	Round 12	Gold Coast Titans	Skilled Park	12 – 31	Graham, Lowe, Winterstein	Lui (0/2), Morgan (0/1)	12,790
8 June	Round 13	Canterbury Bulldogs	1300SMILES Stadium	26 – 36	Greenshields, Johnson, Lui, Tate	Lui (5/5)	12,775
14 June	Round 14	St George Illawarra Dragons	WIN Stadium	22 – 16	Greenshields, Linnett, Tate, Winterstein	Thurston (3/4)	9,035
	Round 15	Bye					
30 June	Round 16	Cronulla Sharks	1300SMILES Stadium	24 – 4	Linnett, Cooper, Winterstein	Thurston (4/5)	14,434
7 July	Round 17	Canberra Raiders	Canberra Stadium	18 – 26	Lui, Thurston, Winterstein	Thurston (3/3)	10,515
15 July	Round 18	Manly Sea Eagles	1300SMILES Stadium	14 – 34	Bowen, Morgan	Lowe (3/3)	9,029
	Round 19	Bye					
July 26	Round 20	Brisbane Broncos	1300SMILES Stadium	16 – 18	Bowen, Cooper, Faifai Loa	Thurston (2/3)	17,702
3 August	Round 21	South Sydney Rabbitohs	1300SMILES Stadium	30 – 12	Linnett (2), Lui, T Sims, Tate	Thurston (5/6)	13,045
11 August	Round 22	Penrith Panthers	Centrebet Stadium	36 – 4	Thompson (3), Feldt, Tate, Winterstein	Thurston (6/6)	6,611
17 August	Round 23	Gold Coast Titans	1300SMILES Stadium	22 – 10	Feldt (2), Cooper, Hall	Thurston (3/4)	12,003
24 August	Round 24	Newcastle Knights	1300SMILES Stadium	26 – 6	Ulugia (2), Lui, Tate	Thurston (5/6)	12,208
1 September	Round 25	Cronulla Sharks	Remondis Stadium	31 – 18	Cooper (2), Bowen, T Sims, Tate	Thurston (5/6, 1 FG)	15,313
7 September	Round 26	Wests Tigers	1300SMILES Stadium	50 – 22	Ulugia (3), Bowen (2), Lui, Taumalolo, Thurston, Winterstein	Thurston (6/7), Bowen (1/2)	19,519
Legend: Win Loss Draw Bye

=== Finals ===
Date	Round	Opponent	Venue	Score	Tries	Goals	Attendance
14 September	Qualifying Final	Cronulla Sharks	Allianz Stadium	18 – 20	Tate, Taumalolo, Ulugia	Thurston (3/4)	32,747
Legend: Win Loss Draw Bye

== Statistics ==
Name	App	T	G	FG	Pts
Scott Bolton	18	-	-	-	-
Matthew Bowen	19	6	1	-	26
Gavin Cooper	22	7	-	-	28
Kalifa Faifai Loa	7	3	-	-	12
Kyle Feldt	3	3	-	-	12
Ashley Graham	14	7	-	-	28
Clint Greenshields	6	3	-	-	12
Glenn Hall	25	2	-	-	8
Jayden Hodges	3	-	-	-	-
Dallas Johnson	15	1	-	-	4
Rory Kostjasyn	20	-	-	-	-
Blake Leary	1	-	-	-	-
Kane Linnett	25	9	-	-	36
Ethan Lowe	2	1	3	-	10
Robert Lui	16	7	5	-	38
Anthony Mitchell	4	-	-	-	-
Scott Moore	6	-	-	-	-
Michael Morgan	9	2	-	-	8
Joel Riethmuller	12	-	-	-	-
Matthew Scott	22	-	-	-	-
Ashton Sims	17	-	-	-	-
Tariq Sims	23	4	-	-	16
James Tamou	22	-	-	-	-
Brent Tate	23	10	-	-	40
Jason Taumalolo	14	2	-	-	8
Ray Thompson	19	3	-	-	12
Ricky Thorby	8	-	-	-	-
Johnathan Thurston	22	2	71	1	151
Wayne Ulugia	4	6	-	-	24
Antonio Winterstein	24	13	-	-	52
Totals		91	80	1	525

== Representatives ==
The following players have played a representative match in 2013

	All Stars match	City vs Country	ANZAC Test	Polynesian Cup	State of Origin 1	State of Origin 2	State of Origin 3	Prime Minister's XIII	World Cup
Gavin Cooper	-	-	-	-	-	-	-	Prime Minister's XIII	-
Alex Elisala	-	-	-	Samoa	-	-	-	-	-
Kalifa Faifai Loa	-	-	-	Samoa	-	-	-	-	-
Clint Greenshields	-	-	-	-	-	-	-	-	France
Rory Kostjasyn	-	-	-	-	-	-	-	-	Ireland
Kane Linnett	-	-	-	-	-	-	-	-	Scotland
Joel Riethmuller	-	-	-	Samoa	-	-	-	-	Italy
Matthew Scott	-	-	Australia	-	Queensland	Queensland	Queensland	-	Australia
Ashton Sims	-	-	-	-	-	-	-	-	Fiji
Tariq Sims	-	Country	-	-	-	-	-	-	Fiji
James Tamou	NRL All Stars	-	Australia	-	New South Wales	-	New South Wales	Prime Minister's XIII	Australia
Brent Tate	-	-	-	-	Queensland	Queensland	Queensland	Prime Minister's XIII	Australia
Jason Taumalolo	-	-	-	Tonga	-	-	-	-	Tonga
Ray Thompson	-	-	-	-	-	-	-	-	Papua New Guinea
Johnathan Thurston	Indigenous All Stars	-	Australia	-	Queensland	Queensland	Queensland	-	Australia
Antonio Winterstein	-	-	-	Samoa	-	-	-	-	Samoa

== Honours ==
=== League ===
- Dally M Five-Eighth of the Year: Johnathan Thurston

=== Club ===
- Paul Bowman Medal: Matthew Scott
- Player's Player: Matthew Scott
- Club Person of the Year: Kevin Marty
- Rookie of the Year: Kyle Feldt
- Most Improved: Joel Riethmuller
- NYC Player of the Year: Jayden Hodges

== Feeder Clubs ==
=== National Youth Competition ===
- North Queensland Cowboys - 10th, missed finals

=== Queensland Cup ===
- Mackay Cutters - 2nd, won Grand Final
- Northern Pride - 1st, lost Preliminary Final
