= 2013 Gold Coast Titans season =

National Rugby League team season

Coordinates: 28°4′1″S 153°22′44″E

- NRL Rank: 9th
- 2013 record: Wins: 11; draws: 0; losses: 13
- Points scored: For: 500; against: 518

Team information
- CEO: Graham Annesley
- Coach: John Cartwright
- Captain: Greg Bird Nate Myles
- Stadium: Skilled Park
- Avg. attendance: 14,572
- High attendance: 22,749 (vs. Brisbane Broncos, Rd 5)

Top scorers
- Tries: Kevin Gordon (15)
- Goals: Aidan Sezer (75)
- Points: Aidan Sezer (156)
← 2012	List of seasons	2014 →

The 2013 Gold Coast Titans season was the 7th in the club's history. Coached by John Cartwright and co-captained by Greg Bird and Nate Myles, they competed in the NRL's 2013 Telstra Premiership. Gold Coast finished the regular season in 9th (out of 16) and failed to qualify the finals for the third consecutive year.

== Season summary ==
=== Milestones ===
- Round 1: Albert Kelly, Brad Takairangi and Dave Taylor made their debuts for the club.
- Round 2: Greg Bird scored his 50th career try.
- Round 2: The club recorded their biggest ever win, 36 points.
- Round 3: Ryan James scored his 1st career try.
- Round 3: Ashley Harrison played his 250th career game.
- Round 4: Steve Michaels played his 50th game for the club.
- Round 6: Anthony Don and Sam Irwin made their first grade debuts.
- Round 8: Mark Ioane made his first grade debut.
- Round 10: William Zillman played his 100th game for the club.
- Round 11: The club recorded their biggest ever win, 38 points.
- Round 11: The club scored 40+ points for the first time in their history, with 42.
- Round 12: Jamal Idris played his 100th career game.
- Round 12: Shane Gray made his first grade debut.
- Round 16: Ashley Harrison played his 100th game for the club.
- Round 17: Jahrome Hughes and Hymel Hunt made their first grade debuts.
- Round 17: Greg Bird played his 200th career game and Matt Srama played his 50th career game.
- Round 21: Jamie Dowling scored his first career try.
- Round 22: Luke O'Dwyer played his 100th game for the club.
- Round 22: David Mead scored his 50th career try.
- Round 23: Kevin Gordon scored his 50th career try.
- Round 24: Mark Minichiello played his 150th game for the club.
- Round 25: Luke Bailey played his 250th career game.
- Round 26: Beau Falloon played his 50th career game.

== Squad List ==
Gold Coast Titans
First team squad			Coaching staff
Luke Bailey – PR; Marmin Barba – FB, FE; Greg Bird (c) – SR; Shaun Carney – FB; Anthony Don – FB, WG; Luke Douglas – PR; Jamie Dowling – WG, FB; Beau Falloon – HK; Kevin Gordon – WG, CE; Shane Gray – SR; Ashley Harrison – LK, SR; Beau Henry – FE, HB	Jahrome Hughes – FB; Hymel Hunt – CE; Jamal Idris – CE; Mark Ioane – PR; Sam Irwin – HK; Ryan James – PR, SR; Albert Kelly – HB, FE; David Mead – WG; Steve Michaels – WG, CE; Mark Minichiello – SR; Nate Myles (c) – PR, SR; Cody Nelson – LK, FE	Mark O'Dare – WG; Luke O'Dwyer – SR, LK; Luke Page – PR; Jordan Rankin – HB, FB; Ben Ridge – SR; Matty Russell – FB, WG; Aidan Sezer – FE; Matt Srama – HK; Brad Takairangi – SR, CE; Dave Taylor – SR; Matt White – PR; William Zillman – FB, FE	Head coach: John Cartwright; Legend: (c) Captain(s); (vc) Vice-captain(s); Updated: 22 February 2013; Source(s): Titans Squad

== Squad Movement ==
=== Gains ===
Players	Signed From	Until End of	Notes
Marmin Barba	Parramatta Eels	2014	
Mark Ioane	Canberra Raiders	2013	
Albert Kelly	Unattached	2014	
Matty Russell	Wigan Warriors (Super League)	2014	
Brad Takairangi	Sydney Roosters	2015	
Dave Taylor	South Sydney Rabbitohs	2014	

=== Losses ===
Players	Signed To	Until End of	Notes
Beau Champion	South Sydney Rabbitohs	2014	
Phil Graham	Retirement	-	
Michael Henderson	St. George Illawarra Dragons	2013	
Brenton Lawrence	Manly-Warringah Sea Eagles	2015	
Kayne Lawton	Manly-Warringah Sea Eagles	2013	
Dominique Peyroux	New Zealand Warriors	2014	
Scott Prince	Brisbane Broncos	2014	
Bodene Thompson	Wests Tigers	2014	
Joe Vickery	Leeds Rhinos (Super League)	2013	

=== Re-signings ===
Players	Club	Until End of	Notes
Luke Bailey	Gold Coast Titans	2014	
Greg Bird	Gold Coast Titans	2017	
Ashley Harrison	Gold Coast Titans	2015	
Mark Ioane	Gold Coast Titans	2015	
Albert Kelly	Gold Coast Titans	2015	
David Mead	Gold Coast Titans	2016	
Aidan Sezer	Gold Coast Titans	2015	

=== Contract Lengths ===
Player	2013	2014	2015	2016	2017	Source
Luke O'Dwyer	Gold Coast Titans	Retirement				
Beau Falloon	Gold Coast Titans					
Beau Henry	Gold Coast Titans					
Luke Bailey	Gold Coast Titans					
Marmin Barba	Gold Coast Titans					
Luke Douglas	Gold Coast Titans					
Kevin Gordon	Gold Coast Titans					
Ryan James	Gold Coast Titans					
Mark Minichiello	Gold Coast Titans					
Jordan Rankin	Gold Coast Titans					
Matthew Russell	Gold Coast Titans					
Matt Srama	Gold Coast Titans					
Dave Taylor	Gold Coast Titans					
Ashley Harrison	Gold Coast Titans					
Mark Ioane	Gold Coast Titans					
Albert Kelly	Gold Coast Titans					
Steve Michaels	Gold Coast Titans					
Nate Myles	Gold Coast Titans					
Ben Ridge	Gold Coast Titans					
Aidan Sezer	Gold Coast Titans					
Brad Takairangi	Gold Coast Titans					
Matt White	Gold Coast Titans					
Jamal Idris	Gold Coast Titans					
David Mead	Gold Coast Titans					
Greg Bird	Gold Coast Titans					
William Zillman	Gold Coast Titans					

== Ladder ==
2013 NRL season
Pos	Team	Pld	W	D	L	B	PF	PA	PD	Pts
1	Sydney Roosters (P)	24	18	0	6	2	640	325	+315	40
2	South Sydney Rabbitohs	24	18	0	6	2	588	384	+204	40
3	Melbourne Storm	24	16	1	7	2	589	373	+216	37
4	Manly Warringah Sea Eagles	24	15	1	8	2	588	366	+222	35
5	Cronulla-Sutherland Sharks	24	14	0	10	2	468	460	+8	32
6	Canterbury-Bankstown Bulldogs	24	13	0	11	2	529	463	+66	30
7	Newcastle Knights	24	12	1	11	2	528	422	+106	29
8	North Queensland Cowboys	24	12	0	12	2	507	431	+76	28
9	Gold Coast Titans	24	11	0	13	2	500	518	−18	26
10	Penrith Panthers	24	11	0	13	2	495	532	−37	26
11	New Zealand Warriors	24	11	0	13	2	495	554	−59	26
12	Brisbane Broncos	24	10	1	13	2	434	477	−43	25
13	Canberra Raiders	24	10	0	14	2	434	624	−190	24
14	St. George Illawarra Dragons	24	7	0	17	2	379	530	−151	18
15	Wests Tigers	24	7	0	17	2	386	687	−301	18
16	Parramatta Eels	24	5	0	19	2	326	740	−414	14

== Fixtures ==
=== Pre-season ===
Date	Round	Opponent	Venue	Score	Tries	Goals	Attendance
Saturday, 9 February	Trial 1	New Zealand Warriors	Pizzey Park	42 – 24	Don (2), O'Dare (2), Michaels, Falloon, Rankin	Henry (3), Rankin (4)	5,500
Saturday, 16 February	Trial 2	Brisbane Broncos	Dolphin Oval	16 – 14	Kelly, Mead, Falloon	Sezer (2)	4,510
Saturday, 23 February	Trial 3	North Queensland Cowboys	Virgin Australia Stadium	28 – 10	Mead, James, Bird, Idris, Irwin	Sezer (4)	8,000
Legend: Win Loss Draw

=== Regular season ===
Date	Round	Opponent	Venue	Score	Tries	Goals	Attendance
Sunday, 10 March	Round 1	Cronulla-Sutherland Sharks	Sharks Stadium	10 – 12	Mead, Taylor	Sezer (1/2)	17,541
Sunday, 17 March	Round 2	Canberra Raiders	Skilled Park	36 – 0	Kelly (2), Srama (2), Bird, Gordon	Sezer (6/7)	12,267
Saturday, 23 March	Round 3	Manly-Warringah Sea Eagles	Skilled Park	16 – 14	James, Mead	Sezer (4/4)	13,168
Sunday, 31 March	Round 4	Penrith Panthers	Centrebet Stadium	28 – 10	Gordon (2), Mead, Bird, Michaels	Sezer (4/5)	8,181
Friday, 5 April	Round 5	Brisbane Broncos	Skilled Park	12 – 32	Kelly, Falloon	Bird (2/2)	22,749
Sunday, 14 April	Round 6	Parramatta Eels	Skilled Park	28 – 22	Don, Harrison, Minichiello, Kelly	Henry (6/6)	12,047
Sunday, 28 April	Round 7	Newcastle Knights	Skilled Park	6 – 30	Kelly	Sezer (1/1)	14,201
Sunday, 5 May	Round 8	New Zealand Warriors	Mt Smart Stadium	24 – 25	Idris (2), Zillman, Don	Sezer (4/4)	9,465
Sunday, 12 May	Round 9	St. George Illawarra Dragons	Skilled Park	15 – 14	Zillman (2)	Sezer (3/3) & (FG)	12,117
Friday, 17 May	Round 10	Brisbane Broncos	Suncorp Stadium	6 – 32	Mead	Sezer (1/1)	34,596
Sunday, 26 May	Round 11	Parramatta Eels	Mudgee Stadium	42 – 4	Gordon (2), Idris (2), Don, Takairangi, Kelly	Sezer (7/7)	9,132
Sunday, 2 June	Round 12	North Queensland Cowboys	Skilled Park	31 – 12	Zillman (2), Kelly (2), Minichiello	Sezer (5/5) & (FG)	12,790
	Round 13	Bye					
Sunday, 16 June	Round 14	South Sydney Rabbitohs	Barlow Park	24 – 30	Kelly (2), Gordon, Zillman	Sezer (4/4)	16,118
Monday, 24 June	Round 15	Melbourne Storm	Skilled Park	18 – 12	Gordon, Don, O'Dwyer	Sezer (3/4)	13,044
Sunday, 30 June	Round 16	Newcastle Knights	Hunter Stadium	16 – 46	Gordon, Bird, Mead	Sezer (2/3)	9,208
Saturday, 6 July	Round 17	Penrith Panthers	TIO Stadium	18 – 40	Mead (2), Kelly	Sezer (3/4)	8,050
	Round 18	Bye					
Sunday, 21 July	Round 19	Manly-Warringah Sea Eagles	Brookvale Oval	20 – 38	Gordon (2), Mead, Sezer	Sezer (2/4)	11,905
Saturday, 27 July	Round 20	South Sydney Rabbitohs	Skilled Park	4 – 32	Gordon	Sezer (0/1)	20,392
Sunday, 4 August	Round 21	Wests Tigers	Skilled Park	36 – 6	Dowling, Mead, Takairangi, Taylor, Minichiello, O'Dwyer	Sezer (6/7)	11,731
Monday, 12 August	Round 22	Canterbury-Bankstown Bulldogs	ANZ Stadium	26 – 16	Gordon (3), Mead	Sezer (5/6)	10,373
Saturday, 17 August	Round 23	North Queensland Cowboys	1300SMILES Stadium	10 – 22	Mead, Gordon	Sezer (1/2)	12,003
Saturday, 24 August	Round 24	New Zealand Warriors	Skilled Park	22 – 24	James (2), Takairangi, Don	Sezer (3/4)	15,786
Sunday, 1 September	Round 25	Sydney Roosters	Allianz Stadium	30 – 22	Michaels, Falloon, Don, Takairangi, Taylor	Sezer (5/5)	17,542
Saturday, 7 September	Round 26	Melbourne Storm	AAMI Park	22 – 23	Taylor, Takairangi, Don	Sezer (5/5)	13,826
Legend: Win Loss Draw Bye

== Statistics ==
Name	App	T	G	FG	Pts
Jordan Atkins	2	0	0	0	0
Luke Bailey	20	0	0	0	0
Greg Bird	20	3	2	0	16
Anthony Don	13	7	0	0	28
Luke Douglas	24	0	0	0	0
Jamie Dowling	9	1	0	0	4
Beau Falloon	17	2	0	0	8
Kevin Gordon	22	15	0	0	60
Shane Gray	1	0	0	0	0
Ashley Harrison	19	1	0	0	4
Beau Henry	1	0	6	0	12
Jahrome Hughes	1	0	0	0	0
Hymel Hunt	1	0	0	0	0
Jamal Idris	15	4	0	0	16
Mark Ioane	7	0	0	0	0
Sam Irwin	10	0	0	0	0
Ryan James	22	3	0	0	12
Albert Kelly	21	11	0	0	44
David Mead	16	11	0	0	44
Steve Michaels	9	2	0	0	8
Mark Minichiello	16	3	0	0	12
Nate Myles	19	0	0	0	0
Luke O'Dwyer	9	2	0	0	8
Jordan Rankin	2	0	0	0	0
Ben Ridge	17	0	0	0	0
Aidan Sezer	22	1	75	2	156
Matt Srama	19	2	0	0	8
Brad Takairangi	18	5	0	0	20
Dave Taylor	20	4	0	0	16
William Zillman	16	6	0	0	24
Totals		83	83	2	500

== Representative honours ==
The following players have played a representative match in 2013.

	All Stars	City vs Country	ANZAC Test	State of Origin 1	State of Origin 2	State of Origin 3	World Cup (All Games)
Greg Bird	Indigenous All Stars	-	Australia	New South Wales	New South Wales	New South Wales	Australia
Luke Douglas	-	-	-	-	-	-	Scotland
Ashley Harrison	NRL All Stars	-	-	Queensland	-	-	-
Jamal Idris	-	Country	-	-	-	-	-
Ryan James	Indigenous All Stars	Country	-	-	-	-	-
David Mead	-	-	-	-	-	-	Papua New Guinea
Mark Minichiello	-	-	-	-	-	-	Italy
Nate Myles	-	-	Australia	Queensland	Queensland	Queensland	Australia
Matty Russell	-	-	-	-	-	-	Scotland
Aidan Sezer	Indigenous All Stars	-	-	-	-	-	-
Brad Takairangi	-	-	-	-	-	-	Cook Islands
