= 2013 St. George Illawarra Dragons season =

- 2013 record: Wins: 7; losses: 17
- Points scored: For: 379; against: 530

Team information
- Coach: (Australia) Steve Price
- Captain: (Australia) Ben Creagh
- Stadium: WIN Jubilee Oval WIN Stadium

Top scorers
- Tries: 9 Daniel Vidot, Jason Nightingale & Brett Morris
- Goals: 21 Jamie Soward
- Points: 58 Jamie Soward
← 2012	2014 →

The 2013 St. George Illawarra Dragons season was the 15th in the joint venture club's history. Coached by Steve Price and captained by Ben Creagh, they competed in the National Rugby League's 2013 Telstra Premiership. This season was the worst year performance wise since the joint venture was created. They finished only over the top of Wests Tigers & the Parramatta Eels.

The Dragons started the season losing their first 3 games to Melbourne Storm, Brisbane Broncos & Canberra Raiders only to come back and win their next 3 over Cronulla Sharks, Newcastle Knights & Wests Tigers. The Knights win coming at a cost, with the injury of New Zealand international Gerard Beale for the season. Unfortunately for the Dragons those were the only wins they could string together in 2013 losing another 3 to the Sydney Roosters, the Manly-Warringah Sea Eagles and the Gold Coast Titans.

Round 10 saw a glimmering light at the end of the tunnel for the Dragons when they signed former Canberra Raiders superstar Josh Dugan. Dugan was seen as the answer to the fullback spot left by the injured Beale. He kicked off his career at the joint venture scoring 2 tries in the team's 32-12 romp of the Parramatta Eels 32-12.

The next week the Dragons were sent back to earth with a thud as they became the first St. George Dragons / St. George Illawarra Dragons team to be kept to nil at Jubilee Oval as the Penrith Panthers ran in 3 unanswered tries to win 19-0. This was followed by a loss to the Canterbury-Bankstown Bulldogs by 2 points. This was the last game for the club's all time leading point scorer Jamie Soward for the Dragons as he was dumped out of the side and two weeks later released to join the London Broncos of the Super League.

Over the month of June the Dragons 3-1 record with only a solitary win of the Newcastle Knights in Newcastle, Josh Dugan again scoring 2 tries.

July started disastrously for the Red V again being kept to nil by the Sydney Roosters, losing 36-0. After this night the Dragons had to win almost every remaining game to stay in the final hunt. Round 17 saw first v 2nd last as the Dragons played the South Sydney Rabbitohs away at ANZ Stadium with the Dragons showing true grit to score twice in 10 mins to bring the game into extra time. Brett Morris getting the winning try in golden point extra time.

However the Dragons then went on a streak that was etched in the club's history books, losing their next 6 games, including the 2 teams below them on the points table, an embarrassing loss to Wests Tigers and the Parramatta Eels. Four of those six games were lost by 4 points or less, including a heart-stopping loss to the Cronulla-Sutherland Sharks where Sharks player Andrew Fifita scored on the buzzer to win the local derby after trailing the whole game.

In the last game of the year the Red V said goodbye to some legends of the game including Matt Cooper (rugby league), Nathan Fien and Michael Weyman. The 17 on the field, scoring an impressive 19-10 win over the New Zealand Warriors who needed a win to keep their finals hopes alive.

== Squad ==
St. George Illawarra Dragons
Current NRL premiership squad			Coaching staff
Leeson Ah Mau – PR, SR; Matt Cooper – CE; Ben Creagh (c) – SR; Evander Cummins – FB; Jack De Belin – PR, SR; Josh Dugan – FB; Nathan Fien (vc) – HK; Bronx Goodwin – FB; Gerard Beale – FB, CE; Nathan Green – CE; Bronson Harrison – SR; Dan Hunt – PR; Damien Cook – SR	Tyson Frizell – SR, LK; Cameron King – HK; Josh Drinkwater – HB; Jake Marketo – SR, LK; Will Matthews – SR; Trent Merrin – PR; Adam Quinlan – FB, FE; Brett Morris – FB, WG; Jason Nightingale – FB, WG; Matt Prior – PR, SR; Mitch Rein – HK; Charly Runciman – CE; Jamie Soward (gk) – FE	Chase Stanley – CE; Kyle Stanley – FB, FE; Jack Stockwell – PR; Atelea Vea – SR; Daniel Vidot – CE, WG; Michael Weyman – CE; Craig Garvey – HK	Head coach: Steve Price; Assistant coaches: Steve Folkes - Assistant Coach; Paul McGregor - NSW Cup Head Coach; Andrew Gray - Performance Director; Scott Campbell - Strength & Conditioning Coach; Dan Lawson - Physiotherapist; Matt Shirvington - Sprint Coach; Melanie MacDonald - Sports Science/Dietitian & Nutritionist; Rob Leslie - Athletic Development Coach; Robert Finch - Operations Manager; Joe Grima - Video Analyst; Legend: (c) Captain(s); (vc) Vice-captain(s); (gk) Goal kicker; Injured

=== Transfers ===
New Signings

- Josh Drinkwater from Manly-Warringah Sea Eagles
- Gerard Beale from Brisbane Broncos
- Bronson Harrison from Canberra Raiders
- Taioalo Vaivai from Parramatta Eels
- Tyson Frizell from Cronulla-Sutherland Sharks
- Harry Siejka from New Zealand Warriors
- Josh Dugan Free Agent from Round 10

Transfers/leaving

- Jack Buchanan to Wests Tigers
- David Gower to Manly-Warringah Sea Eagles
- Ben Hornby Retired
- Denan Kemp to Brisbane Broncos
- Jeremy Latimore to Penrith Panthers
- Jake Marketo to Redcliffe Dolphins
- Josh Miller Retired
- Dean Young Retired
- Beau Scott to Newcastle Knights
- Jamie Soward Released from Round 12

== Ladder ==
2013 NRL season
Pos	Team	Pld	W	D	L	B	PF	PA	PD	Pts
1	Sydney Roosters (P)	24	18	0	6	2	640	325	+315	40
2	South Sydney Rabbitohs	24	18	0	6	2	588	384	+204	40
3	Melbourne Storm	24	16	1	7	2	589	373	+216	37
4	Manly Warringah Sea Eagles	24	15	1	8	2	588	366	+222	35
5	Cronulla-Sutherland Sharks	24	14	0	10	2	468	460	+8	32
6	Canterbury-Bankstown Bulldogs	24	13	0	11	2	529	463	+66	30
7	Newcastle Knights	24	12	1	11	2	528	422	+106	29
8	North Queensland Cowboys	24	12	0	12	2	507	431	+76	28
9	Gold Coast Titans	24	11	0	13	2	500	518	−18	26
10	Penrith Panthers	24	11	0	13	2	495	532	−37	26
11	New Zealand Warriors	24	11	0	13	2	495	554	−59	26
12	Brisbane Broncos	24	10	1	13	2	434	477	−43	25
13	Canberra Raiders	24	10	0	14	2	434	624	−190	24
14	St. George Illawarra Dragons	24	7	0	17	2	379	530	−151	18
15	Wests Tigers	24	7	0	17	2	386	687	−301	18
16	Parramatta Eels	24	5	0	19	2	326	740	−414	14
