= 2013 Penrith Panthers season =

- NRL Rank: 10th
- 2013 record: Wins: 11; losses: 13
- Points scored: For: 495; against: 532

Team information
- CEO: Phil Moss
- Coach: Ivan Cleary
- Captain: Kevin Kingston
- Stadium: Centrebet Stadium – 22,500
- Avg. attendance: 10,332

Top scorers
- Tries: David Simmons (19)
- Goals: Luke Walsh (74)
- Points: Luke Walsh (159)
| ← 2012 | List of seasons | 2014 → |

The 2013 Penrith Panthers season was the 47th in the club's history. Coached by Ivan Cleary and captained by Kevin Kingston, the team competed in the National Rugby League's 2013 Telstra Premiership. They finished the regular season 10th (out of 16), failing to reach the finals for the third consecutive year.

A report conducted by Brand Finance valued the Penrith Panthers club at $46.2m, the highest of any Australian sporting brand.

== Squad ==
Penrith Panthers
| 2013 NRL Team | | | Extended squad | Coaching staff |
|---|---|---|---|---|
| Sam Anderson – PR; Blake Austin – FE, HB; Lewis Brown – SR, CE; Cameron Ciraldo – SR, LK; Lachlan Coote – FB, FE; Geoff Daniela – CE, WG; Adam Docker – LK; Tim Grant – PR; Tom Humble – HB, FE; Isaac John – FE, HB; Kevin Kingston (c) – HK; Jeremy Latimore – PR; Josh Mansour – WG | Sika Manu – SR; Mose Masoe – PR; Sam McKendry – PR; Matt Moylan – FB; Wes Naiqama – CE, WG, FB; Clint Newton – SR; Nigel Plum – PR, SR, LK; James Roberts – WG, CE; Matt Robinson – LK; Travis Robinson – WG; James Segeyaro – HK; David Simmons – WG, FB, CE; Ryan Simpkins – LK | Nathan Smith – LK, SR; Brad Tighe – CE; Luke Walsh – HB; Dean Whare – CE, FB | Luke Capewell – FB, WG – Gain: 24 May; Anthony Cherrington – HK; Tom Eisenhuth – CE, SR; Daniel Foster – HB; Danny Galea – CE, SR – Loss: 29 Jun; Kane Morgan – WG; Kyle O'Donnell – PR; Mosese Pangai – CE; Dayne Weston – PR – Loss: 6 May | Head coach: Ivan Cleary; Assistant coach: David Fairleigh; Legend: (c) Captain(s); (vc) Vice-captain(s) |

=== Player transfers ===
A † denotes that the transfer occurred during the 2013 season.

Gains
| Player | Signed From | Until end of | Ref. |
|---|---|---|---|
| Sam Anderson | Newcastle Knights | 2013 | |
| Lewis Brown | New Zealand Warriors | 2015 | |
| Luke Capewell† | Brisbane Broncos | 2014 | |
| Anthony Cherrington | Sydney Roosters | 2014 | |
| Tom Humble | Wests Tigers | 2014 | |
| Isaac John | Wakefield Trinity Wildcats (Super League) | 2013 | |
| Jeremy Latimore | St. George Illawarra Dragons | 2014 | |
| Sika Manu | Melbourne Storm | 2015 | |
| Mose Masoe | Sydney Roosters | 2014 | |
| Wes Naiqama | Newcastle Knights | 2014 | |
| Kyle O'Donnell | Newcastle Knights | 2014 | |
| Mosese Pangai | North Queensland Cowboys | 2014 | |
| James Roberts | South Sydney Rabbitohs | 2014 | |
| Dean Whare | Manly-Warringah Sea Eagles | 2014 | |

Losses
| Player | Signed To | Until end of | Ref. |
|---|---|---|---|
| Mitch Achurch | Leeds Rhinos (Super League) | 2016 | |
| Travis Burns | Hull Kingston Rovers (Super League) | 2015 | |
| Danny Galea† | Canterbury-Bankstown Bulldogs | 2013 | |
| Michael Gordon | Cronulla-Sutherland Sharks | 2015 | |
| Michael Jennings | Sydney Roosters | 2016 | |
| Luke Lewis | Cronulla-Sutherland Sharks | 2016 | |
| Harry Siejka | New Zealand Warriors | | |
| Arana Taumata | Released | - | |
| Dayne Weston† | Melbourne Storm | | |

== Jersey and Sponsors ==
2013 Women in League Jersey

In 2013 the Panthers had changed jersey suppliers, ending the relationship with supplier ISC, and starting a new apparel agreement with ASICS. They retained their predominantly black home jerseys from 2012, with minor changes to the collar, mainly due to the change in supplier. The alternate jersey was predominantly white with teal hoops around the midsection, though this jersey was seldom used in 2013, instead opting to use the Women in League jersey for away fixtures which is pink in colour. The heritage jersey used was the 1967 white 'V' on brown design.

OAK were again the major sponsor of the Panthers in 2013. Hertz were announced as the sleeve sponsor for 2013. Tony Ferguson Weight Loss was located on the lower back of the jersey. Tooheys New and HostPlus were short sponsors for 2013.

== Fixtures ==
The Panthers again use Centrebet Stadium as their home ground in 2013, their home ground since they entered the competition in 1967. In Round 17 Penrith got their largest ever win over the Gold Coast Titans, winning 40–18.

=== Pre-season ===
| Date | Round | Opponent | Venue | Score | Tries | Goals | Attendance | Report |
|---|---|---|---|---|---|---|---|---|
| 8 February | Trial 1 | Wests Tigers | Carrington Park | 34–32 | Nabuli, Daniela, Austin, Coote, T Robinson, Roberts | Austin (5/6) | | |
| 16 February | Trial 2 | New Zealand Warriors | Waikato Stadium | 18–32 | Mansour, Brown (2), Simmons, Coote, Daniela | Walsh (3/3), Naiqama (1/3) | 10 000+ | |
| 23 February | Trial 3 | Parramatta Eels | Centrebet Stadium | 10–10 | Naiqama, Simmons | Naiqama (1/2) | | |
Legend: Win Loss Draw

=== Regular season ===
| Date | Round | Opponent | Venue | Score | Tries | Goals | Attendance | Report |
|---|---|---|---|---|---|---|---|---|
| 10 March | Round 1 | Canberra Raiders | Centrebet Stadium | 32–10 | Manu, Segeyaro, Coote, Smith, Plum | Walsh (6/6) | 10,882 | |
| 17 March | Round 2 | Wests Tigers | Campbelltown Stadium | 28–18 | Manu (2), Simmons | Walsh (3/3) | 9,715 | |
| 24 March | Round 3 | South Sydney Rabbitohs | Centrebet Stadium | 32–44 | Simmons (2), McKendry, Tighe, Segeyaro, Naiqama | Walsh (4/6) | 12,940 | |
| 31 March | Round 4 | Gold Coast Titans | Centrebet Stadium | 10–28 | Naiqama, Humble | Naiqama (1/1), Walsh (0/6) | 8,181 | |
| 6 April | Round 5 | North Queensland Cowboys | Townsville Stadium | 30–0 | | | 12,431 | |
| 13 April | Round 6 | Newcastle Knights | Hunter Stadium | 8–6 | Manu | Walsh (1/1) | 15,536 | |
| 29 April | Round 7 | Parramatta Eels | Centrebet Stadium | 44–12 | Robinson (2), Segeyaro (2), Simmons (2), Whare, Brown | Moylan (1/1), Walsh (5/7) | 14,211 | |
| 5 May | Round 8 | Sydney Roosters | Allianz Stadium | 30–6 | Moylan | Walsh (1/1) | 11,176 | |
| 12 May | Round 9 | Melbourne Storm | Centrebet Stadium | 12–10 | Simmons (2), Robinson | Walsh (0/3) | 7,803 | |
| 18 May | Round 10 | New Zealand Warriors | Centrebet Stadium | 62–6 | John (3), Brown (2), T Robinson, Segeyaro M Robinson, Simmons, Kingston | Walsh (11/11) | 9,386 | |
| 25 May | Round 11 | St George Illawarra Dragons | WIN Jubilee Oval | 0–19 | Robinson, Moylan, Whare | Walsh (3/3), FG (1) | 10,922 | |
| | Round 12 | Bye | | | | | | |
| 9 June | Round 13 | Wests Tigers | Centrebet Stadium | 18–20 | Simmons, Masoe, Whare | Walsh (3/3) | 16,827 | |
| 15 June | Round 14 | Canberra Raiders | Canberra Stadium | 24–12 | Simmons (2) | Moylan (1/1), Walsh (1/1) | 9,176 | |
| | Round 15 | Bye | | | | | | |
| 29 June | Round 16 | St George Illawarra Dragons | Centrebet Stadium | 25–10 | Moylan, Tighe, Roberts, Segeyaro | Walsh (4/4), FG (1) | 6,271 | |
| 6 July | Round 17 | Gold Coast Titans | TIO Stadium | 40–18 | Roberts (3), Simmons (2), Walsh, Kingston | Walsh (6/7) | 8,050 | |
| 13 July | Round 18 | Parramatta Eels | Parramatta Stadium | 10–17 | Simmons (2), Kingston | Walsh (2/3), FG (1) | 9,327 | |
| 21 July | Round 19 | Newcastle Knights | Centrebet Stadium | 14–32 | Whare, Newton | Walsh (3/3) | 10,240 | |
| 28 July | Round 20 | Cronulla-Sutherland Sharks | Shark Stadium | 38–10 | Roberts (2) | Moylan (0/1), Walsh (1/1) | 14,120 | |
| 2 August | Round 21 | Sydney Roosters | Centrebet Stadium | 6–42 | Simmons | Walsh (1/1) | 11,879 | |
| 11 August | Round 22 | North Queensland Cowboys | Centrebet Stadium | 4–36 | Simmons | Walsh (0/1) | 6,611 | |
| 18 August | Round 23 | New Zealand Warriors | Mt Smart Stadium | 24–28 | Mansour (2), Simmons (2), Manu | Walsh (4/5) | 11,596 | |
| 23 August | Round 24 | Brisbane Broncos | Centrebet Stadium | 28–12 | Segeyaro (3), Simpkins | Walsh (6/6) | 8,817 | |
| 31 August | Round 25 | Canterbury-Bankstown Bulldogs | ANZ Stadium | 34–14 | John, Mansour | Walsh (3/3) | 15,313 | |
| 8 September | Round 26 | Manly-Warringah Sea Eagles | Brookvale Oval | 38–26 | Walsh, Segeyaro, Mansour, Newton, Whare, Masoe | Walsh (6/6), Newton (1/1) | 12,090 | |
Legend: Win Loss Draw

== Ladder ==
2013 NRL season
| Pos | Team | Pld | W | D | L | B | PF | PA | PD | Pts |
|---|---|---|---|---|---|---|---|---|---|---|
| 1 | Sydney Roosters (P) | 24 | 18 | 0 | 6 | 2 | 640 | 325 | +315 | 40 |
| 2 | South Sydney Rabbitohs | 24 | 18 | 0 | 6 | 2 | 588 | 384 | +204 | 40 |
| 3 | Melbourne Storm | 24 | 16 | 1 | 7 | 2 | 589 | 373 | +216 | 37 |
| 4 | Manly Warringah Sea Eagles | 24 | 15 | 1 | 8 | 2 | 588 | 366 | +222 | 35 |
| 5 | Cronulla-Sutherland Sharks | 24 | 14 | 0 | 10 | 2 | 468 | 460 | +8 | 32 |
| 6 | Canterbury-Bankstown Bulldogs | 24 | 13 | 0 | 11 | 2 | 529 | 463 | +66 | 30 |
| 7 | Newcastle Knights | 24 | 12 | 1 | 11 | 2 | 528 | 422 | +106 | 29 |
| 8 | North Queensland Cowboys | 24 | 12 | 0 | 12 | 2 | 507 | 431 | +76 | 28 |
| 9 | Gold Coast Titans | 24 | 11 | 0 | 13 | 2 | 500 | 518 | −18 | 26 |
| 10 | Penrith Panthers | 24 | 11 | 0 | 13 | 2 | 495 | 532 | −37 | 26 |
| 11 | New Zealand Warriors | 24 | 11 | 0 | 13 | 2 | 495 | 554 | −59 | 26 |
| 12 | Brisbane Broncos | 24 | 10 | 1 | 13 | 2 | 434 | 477 | −43 | 25 |
| 13 | Canberra Raiders | 24 | 10 | 0 | 14 | 2 | 434 | 624 | −190 | 24 |
| 14 | St. George Illawarra Dragons | 24 | 7 | 0 | 17 | 2 | 379 | 530 | −151 | 18 |
| 15 | Wests Tigers | 24 | 7 | 0 | 17 | 2 | 386 | 687 | −301 | 18 |
| 16 | Parramatta Eels | 24 | 5 | 0 | 19 | 2 | 326 | 740 | −414 | 14 |

== Other teams ==
In addition to competing in the National Rugby League, the Panthers also fielded semi-professional teams in the National Youth Competition's 2013 Holden Cup (for players aged under 20) and the New South Wales Rugby League's 2013 New South Wales Cup, where the team was known as the Windsor Wolves. The NYC team was captained by Tony Satini.

== Representative ==
=== Domestic ===
| Pos. | Player | Team | Call-up |
|---|---|---|---|
| BE | Tim Grant | NRL All Stars | 2013 All Stars match |
| PR | Tim Grant | NSW City | 2013 City vs Country Origin |

=== International ===
| Pos. | Player | Team | Call-up |
|---|---|---|---|
| BE | Sam McKendry | New Zealand | 2013 Anzac Test |
| CE | Dean Whare | New Zealand | 2013 Anzac Test |
| HB | Daniel Foster | Tonga | 2013 Polynesian Cup |
| SR | Sika Manu | Tonga | 2013 Polynesian Cup |
| CE | Geoff Daniela^{1} | Cook Islands | 2013 World Cup |
| HB | Isaac John | Cook Islands | 2013 World Cup |
| CE | Wes Naiqama | Fiji | 2013 World Cup |
| SR | Cameron Ciraldo | Italy | 2013 World Cup |
| CE | Dean Whare | New Zealand | 2013 World Cup |
| HK | James Segeyaro^{2} | Papua New Guinea | 2013 World Cup |
| BE | Mose Masoe | Samoa | 2013 World Cup |
| HB | Daniel Foster | Tonga | 2013 World Cup |
| SR | Sika Manu | Tonga | 2013 World Cup |
| SR | Clint Newton | United States | 2013 World Cup |

1 – Daniela was ruled out by injury.
2 – Segeyaro was ruled out of the tournament by a shoulder injury.
