= Albert Kelly =

Australian rugby league footballer

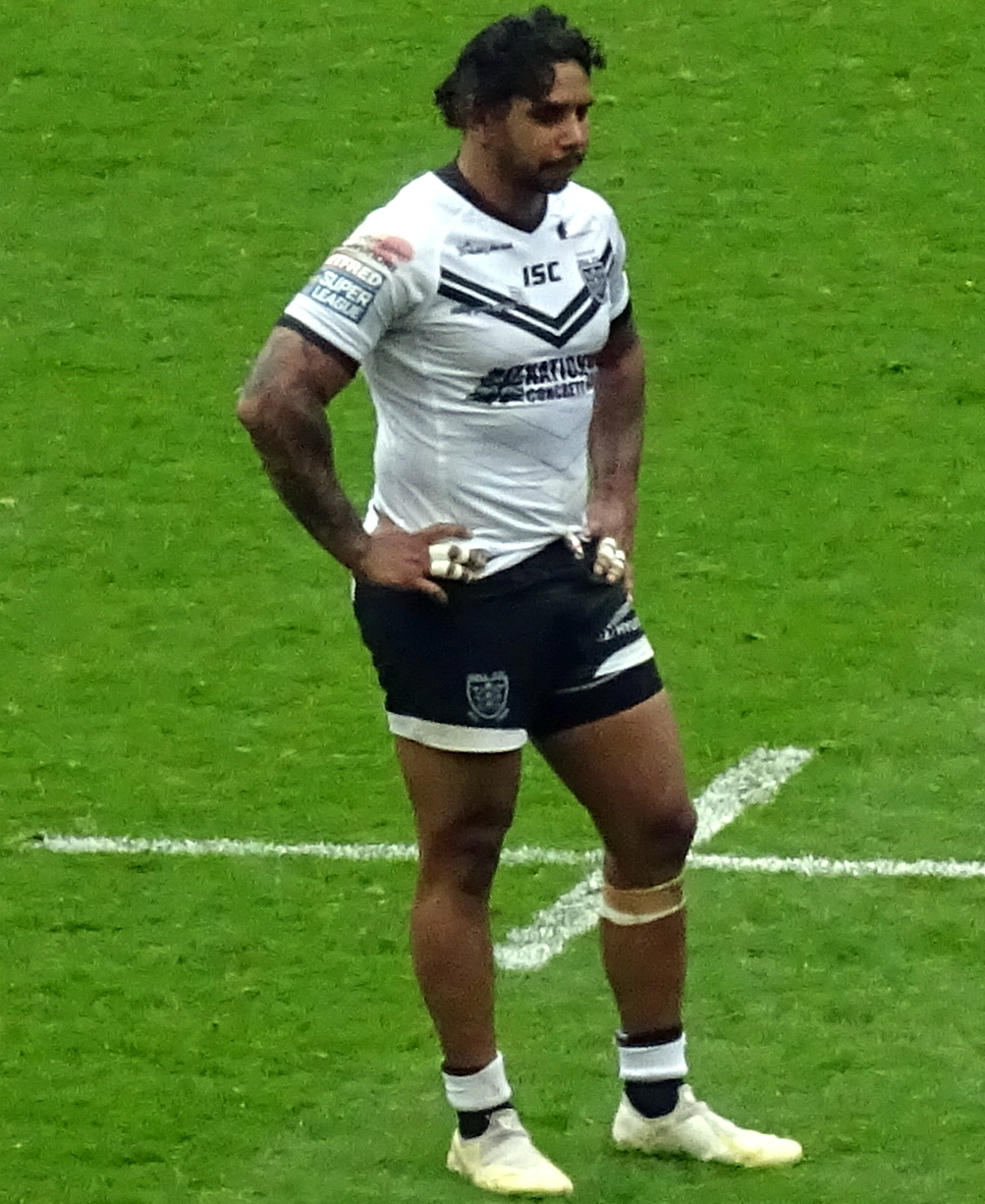

Personal information
- Born: 21 March 1991 (age 35) Macksville, New South Wales, Australia
- Height: 177 cm (5 ft 10 in)
- Weight: 88 kg (13 st 12 lb)

Playing information
- Position: Five-eighth, Halfback
Club
Years	Team	Pld	T	G	FG	P
2010–11	Cronulla Sharks	14	2	0	0	8
2013–14	Gold Coast Titans	33	16	0	0	64
2015–16	Hull Kingston Rovers	43	23	3	0	98
2017–20	Hull FC	74	44	0	1	177
2021–22	Brisbane Broncos	12	3	0	0	12
	Total	176	88	3	1	359
- Source: As of 18 January 2023

Albert Kelly (born 21 March 1991) is an Australian professional rugby league footballer who plays as a five-eighth or halfback for the Cessnock Goannas in the Newcastle Rugby League.

He has previously played for the Cronulla-Sutherland Sharks and the Gold Coast Titans in the National Rugby League (NRL), and Hull Kingston Rovers and Hull F.C. in the Super League. He has also spent time with the Souths Logan Magpies in the Hostplus Cup.

== Early career ==
Kelly was born in Macksville, New South Wales, Australia and grew up in Kempsey, New South Wales. He is an Australian Aborigine of the Gumbaynggirr people.

He started playing at the age of five, he is a product of Group 2 junior rugby league. He attended St Paul's College, Kempsey before moving to Sydney and attending Patrician Brothers' College, Blacktown. He was selected in the New South Wales under-15s Combined Catholic High Schools' rugby league side as five-eighth. In 2008, he played for the Australian Schoolboys where he was vice-captain. He was chased by the Sydney Roosters and St. George Illawarra Dragons, before being signed by the Parramatta Eels on a four-year contract.

== Playing career ==
=== Early career ===
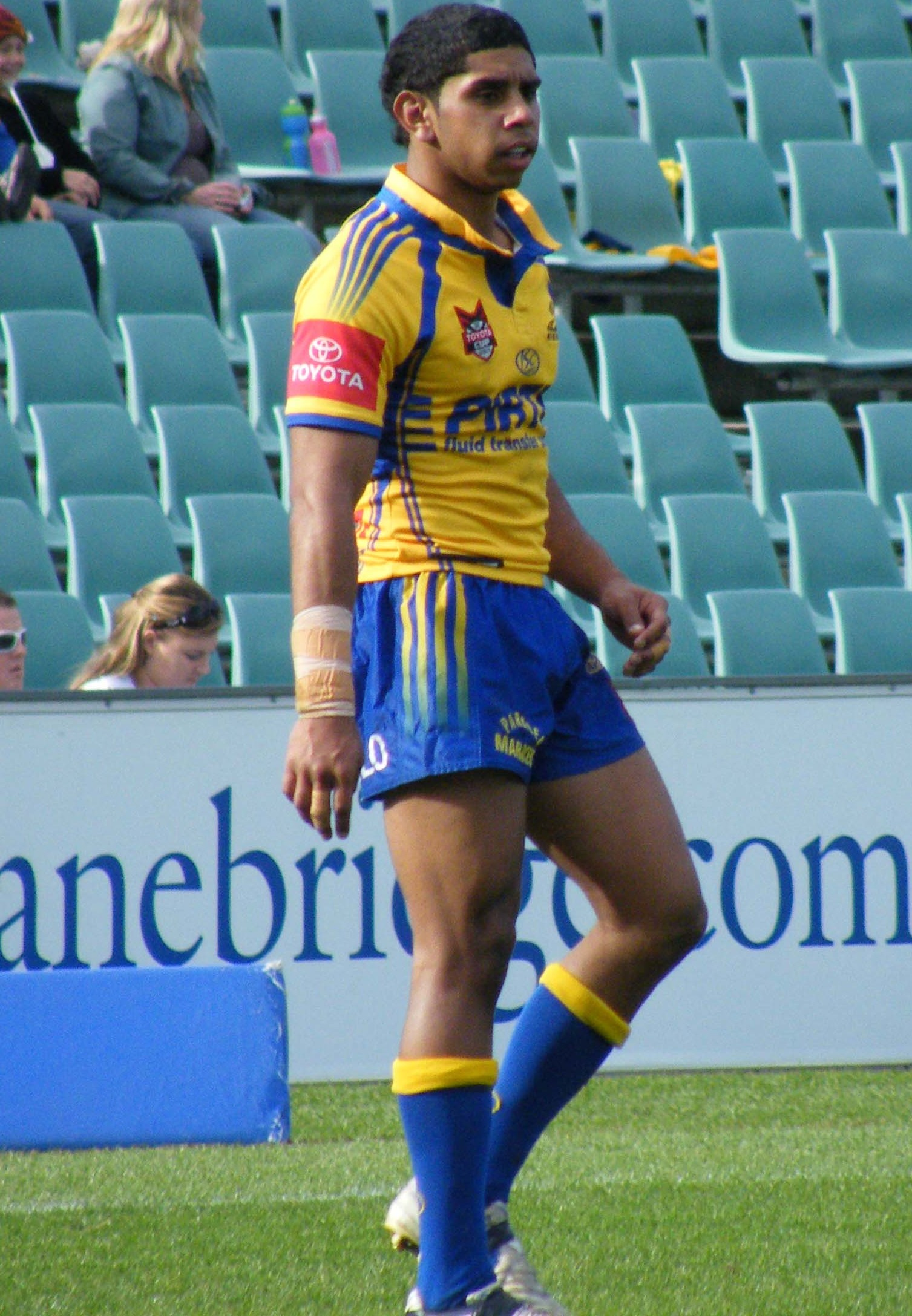
Kelly playing for the Eels

In 2008 to 2010, Kelly played Toyota Cup for the Parramatta Eels' Toyota Cup team, scoring 11 tries in 23 games, and also played for the New South Wales under-18s.

He then played for Cronulla's Toyota Cup team in 2010, scoring three tries in 11 games.

=== Cronulla-Sutherland Sharks ===
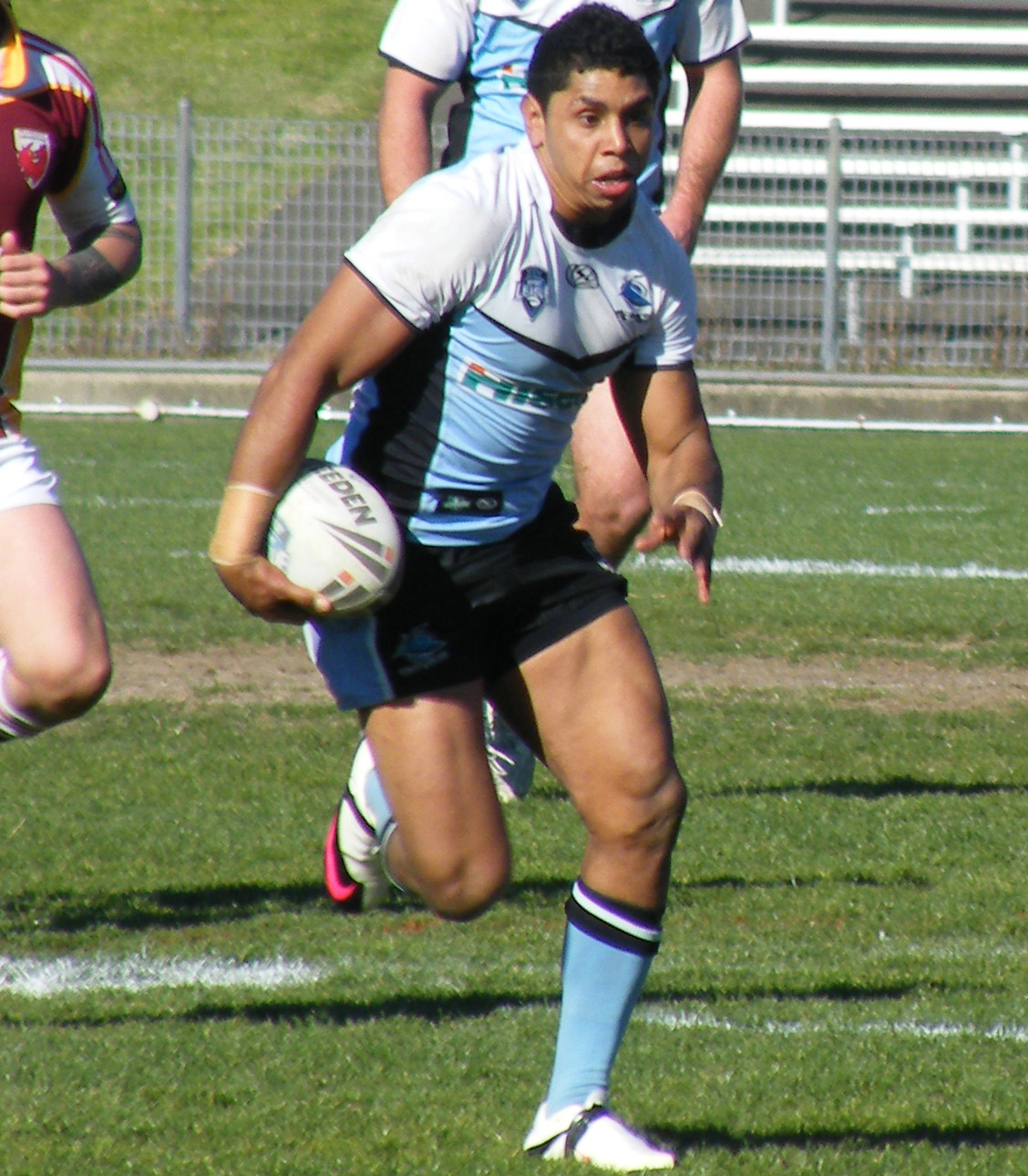
Kelly Playing for the Sharks in 2010

In Round 1 of the 2010 NRL season he made his NRL début for Cronulla-Sutherland against the Melbourne Storm, but played only five matches that year due to injury. He returned in Round 1 of the 2011 season. He scored his first two NRL tries against the Penrith Panthers in Round 3 of the 2011 NRL season. In Round 7, he broke his leg after an attempted tackle playing against the North Queensland Cowboys. Kelly returned for the last two matches of the season. In 2012, Kelly fell out of favour with Cronulla coach Shane Flanagan and was sacked mid-season.

Season	Matches	Tries	Goals	F/G	Points
2010	5	-	-	-	-
2011	9	2	-	-	8
Total	14	8	-	-	8

=== 2012 Newcastle Rugby League ===
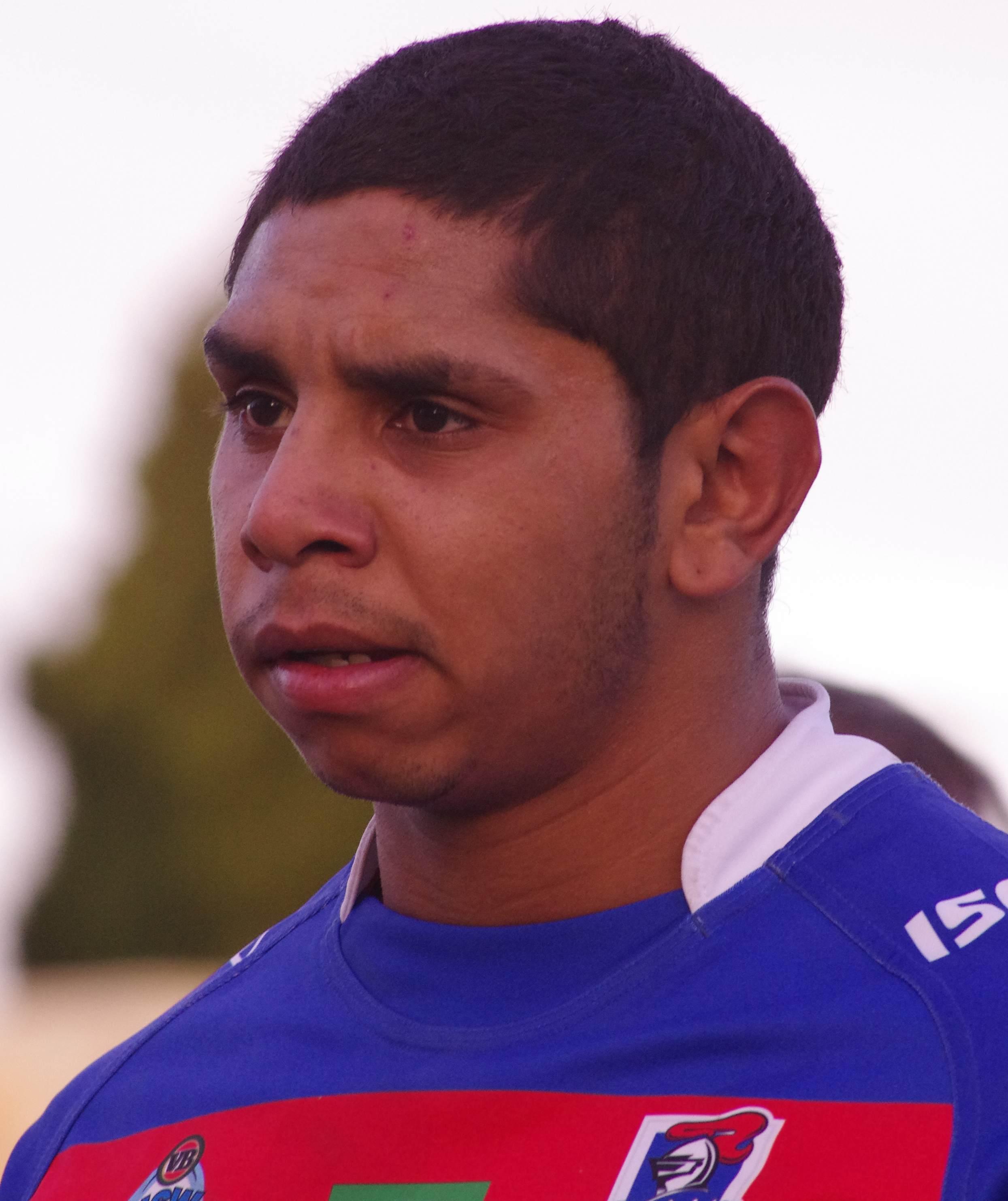
Kelly playing for Newcastle in 2012

In 2012, he signed with the Charlestown-based Central Newcastle Butcher Boys in the Newcastle Rugby League. While signed to Central, Kelly also trained with the Newcastle Knights from early April, as the Knights' coach, Wayne Bennett, offered Kelly help in getting his career and life back on track. He then signed with the Knights to play in the New South Wales Cup competition.

In June 2012, Kelly was suspended before having his contract terminated after pleading guilty in court to smashing a light at Newcastle nightclub Fannys.

=== Gold Coast Titans ===
In 2013, Kelly joined the Gold Coast Titans to trial for a contract. He made his début for the Titans against the Cronulla-Sutherland Sharks. They lost the game 12–10, however there were good signs for Kelly, producing a try assist. In his next game, he scored a double and another try assist against the Canberra Raiders in the 36-0 demolition. On 22 August 2014, Kelly became one of the current NRL players and former Sharks players to accept reduced bans from the Australian Sports Anti-Doping Authority for his role in the club's 2011 supplements program.

Season	Matches	Tries	Goals	F/G	Points
2013	21	11	-	-	44
2014	12	5	-	-	20
Total	33	16	-	-	64

=== Hull Kingston Rovers ===
On 18 October 2014, Kelly was released from the Titans alongside Maurice Blair to sign two-year contracts with Hull Kingston Rovers, replacing Australian halves Travis Burns and Kris Keating. On 30 September 2015, he was named Hull KR Player of the Year. In 2015, Kelly played in the 2015 Challenge Cup final suffering a loss of 50–0 against Leeds Rhinos.

Season	Matches	Tries	Goals	F/G	Points
2015	20	15	2	-	64
Total	20	15	2	-	64

=== Hull F.C. ===
After two seasons at Hull Kingston Rovers he moved to rivals Hull F.C. On 26 August 2017, Kelly played in the 2017 Challenge Cup final for Hull F.C., winning the game 18–14 against the Wigan Warriors at Wembley Stadium

He was also named in the 2017 Super League Dream Team and finishing as Man of Steel runner up 2017.

In 2018 footage emerged of Kelly verbally abusing a female McDonald's employee while intoxicated. Hull FC released a statement a few days later saying the incident had been dealt with internally.

=== Brisbane Broncos ===
Kelly joined Brisbane on a train and trial contract ahead of the 2021 NRL season. He spent the early part of 2021 playing for the Souths Logan Magpies in the Hostplus Cup. While playing for the Magpies in March 2021, Kelly suffered a laceration to his right ear after clashing heads with another player.

He was selected in the halves to replace the dropped Anthony Milford ahead of the round 11 fixture against the Sydney Roosters.

On 3 April 2022, it was announced that Kelly had been placed under investigation by the Brisbane club after video footage emerged which showed Kelly being involved in a drunken fight with teammate Payne Haas.

=== Redcliffe Dolphins ===
On 18 January 2023, Kelly signed a contract to join Redcliffe in the Queensland Cup.

=== Souths Magpies ===
In November 2023, Kelly signed a contract to join Souths Magpies in the Queensland Cup.

== Honours ==
- Challenge Cup: (1) 2017
- Super League Dream Team: (1) 2017

== Personal life ==
Kelly is a cousin of player Greg Inglis.
