= Rory Brien =

Australian rugby league footballer

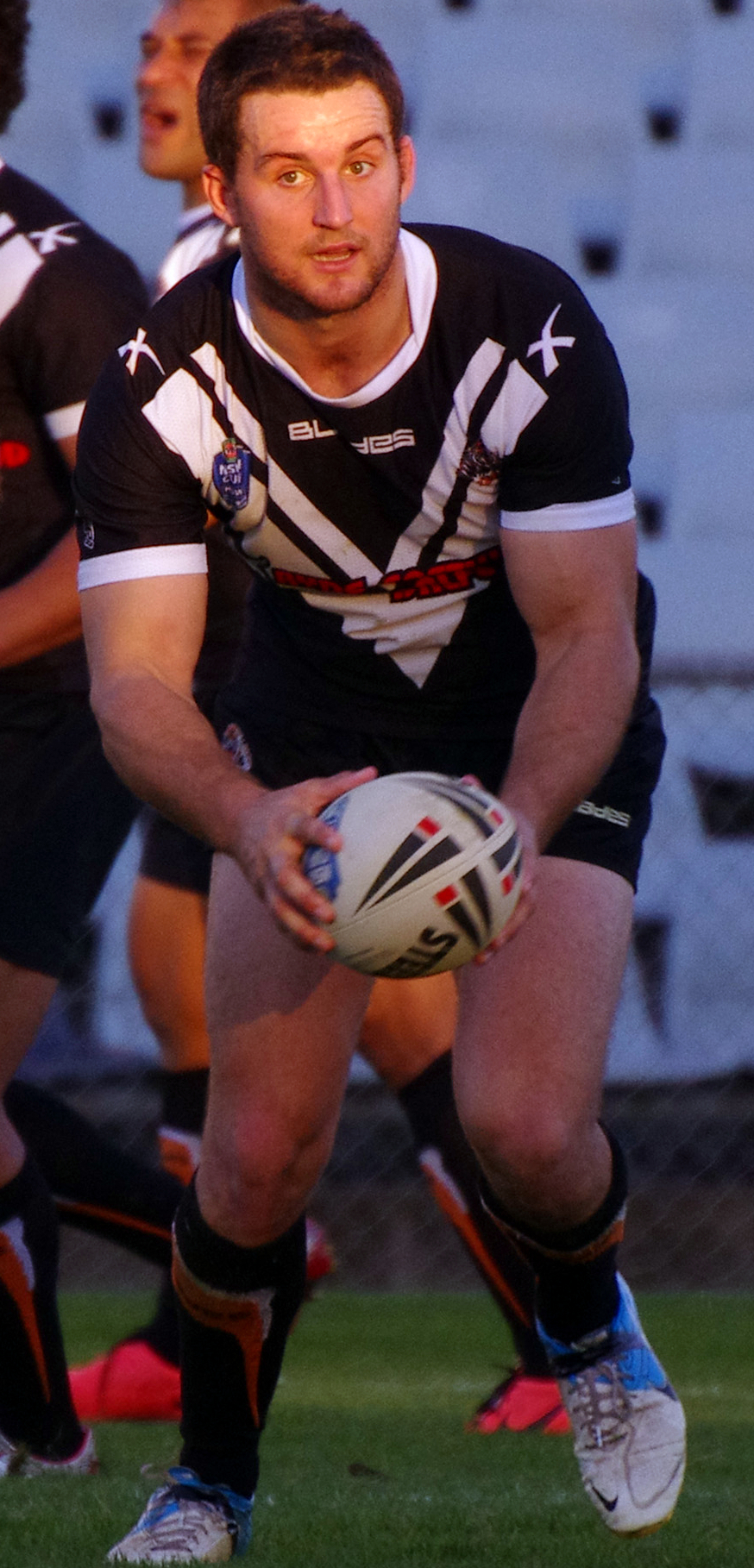

Personal information
- Full name: Rory Brien
- Born: 15 October 1991 (age 33); Sydney, Australia
- Height: 186 cm (6 ft 1 in)
- Weight: 92 kg (14 st 7 lb)

Playing information
- Position: Lock, Centre
Club
Years	Team	Pld	T	G	FG	P
2011	Parramatta Eels	1	0	0	0	0

Rory Brien (born 15 October 1991) is a former rugby league footballer who played for the Parramatta Eels in the NRL. Brien played at either lock or centre. Brien was the Eels Toyota Cup captain in 2011.

== Playing career ==
Brien made his first grade debut in round 23 of the 2011 NRL season against the South Sydney Rabbitohs coming off the bench playing wing to replace Etu Uaisele, Parramatta lost 56–6.

Brien joined the Wests Tigers in 2013 and played with St. George Illawarra in 2015. He returned to Parramatta in 2016. Brien later went on to play for Cowra in the NSW Country competition.
