= 2013 Wests Tigers season =

The 2013 West Tigers season was the fourteenth season in the National Rugby League for the Wests Tigers. They finished the regular season in 15th position, which was the lowest finished place in the club's history.

== Season summary ==
There was high expectations for the Tigers to finish in the Top 8, after a disappointing 2012 season which had seen them start as favorites to take out the premiership but instead finished 10th. With the sacking of Tim Sheens a new coach Mick Potter had been appointed. Mick Potter enjoyed success as a coach in England but wanted to replicate his success to the Wests Tigers. The signings of experienced half Braith Anasta, the hard running forward Eddy Pettybourne and the skillful second rower Bodene Thompson, the Tigers set themselves for a great chance of making the top 8. The losses of the hard hitting and three time player of the year recipient Gareth Ellis, experienced lock forward Chris Heighington and funny man Beau Ryan seemed to put a few holes in the Tigers experience and character. With the resigning of Tim Moltzen after backflipping his deal to go the St Illarwara Dragons and the hard hitting brute Ben Murdoch-Masila.
