= 2013 Canterbury-Bankstown Bulldogs season =

Canterbury-Bankstown Bulldogs
- 2013 season
- CEO: Todd Greenberg; Raelene Castle
- Head coach: Des Hasler
- Captain: Michael Ennis
- Top try scorer: Club: Sam Perrett (18)
- Top points scorer: Club: Trent Hodkinson (147)
- Highest home attendance: 51,686
- Lowest home attendance: 9,742
- Average home attendance: 19,590

The 2013 Canterbury-Bankstown Bulldogs season is the 79th in the club's history. Coached by Des Hasler and captained by Michael Ennis, they competed in the National Rugby League's 2013 Telstra Premiership. Finishing the regular season in 6th place (out of 16), they thus reached the finals for the second consecutive year. The Bulldogs were then knocked out in the first week of the finals by the Newcastle Knights.

== Results ==
Round	Home	Score	Away	Match Information
Round	Home	Score	Away	Date and Time	Venue
1	Canterbury Bankstown Bulldogs	12–24	North Queensland Cowboys	Sat 9 Mar 2013, 7:30pm AEDT	Bluetounge Stadium
2	Parramatta Eels	16–20	Canterbury Bankstown Bulldogs	Thur 14 Mar 2013, 8:05pm AEDT	ANZ Stadium
3	Melbourne Storm	22–18	Canterbury Bankstown Bulldogs	Thur 21 Mar 2013, 8:05pm AEDT	AAMI Park
4	Canterbury Bankstown Bulldogs	12–17	South Sydney Rabbitohs	Fri 29 Mar 2013, 4:00pm AEDT	ANZ Stadium
5	Canterbury Bankstown Bulldogs	6–20	Manly-Warringah Sea Eagles	Fri 5 Apr 2013, 7:35pm AEST	ANZ Stadium
6	Sydney Roosters	38–0	Canterbury Bankstown Bulldogs	Fri 12 Apr 2013, 7:35pm AEST	Sydney Football Stadium
7	Cronulla Sharks	8–24	Canterbury Bankstown Bulldogs	Sun 28 Apr 2013, 3:00pm AEST	Bluetounge Stadium
8	Canterbury Bankstown Bulldogs	40–4	Wests Tigers	Fri 3 May 2013, 7:35pm AEST	ANZ Stadium
9	New Zealand Warriors	16–24	Canterbury Bankstown Bulldogs	Sat 11 May 2013, 7:30pm NZST	Westpac Stadium
10	Newcastle Knights	44–8	Canterbury Bankstown Bulldogs	Sun 19 May 2013, 3:00pm AEST	Hunter Stadium
11	Canterbury Bankstown Bulldogs	24–14	Brisbane Broncos	Fri 24 May 2013, 7:35pm AEST	ANZ Stadium
12	Canterbury Bankstown Bulldogs	16–14	St. George Illawarra Dragons	Fri 31 May 2013, 7:45pm AEST	ANZ Stadium
13	North Queensland Cowboys	26–36	Canterbury Bankstown Bulldogs	Sat 8 Jun 2013, 7:30pm AEST	1300 SMILES Stadium
14	Manly-Warringah Sea Eagles	30–32	Canterbury Bankstown Bulldogs	Fri 14 Jun 2013, 7:35 AEST	Brookvale Oval
15	Canterbury Bankstown Bulldogs	18–20	Sydney Roosters	Fri 21 Jun 2013, 7:45pm AEST	Stadium Australia
16		BYE
17	Canterbury Bankstown Bulldogs	12–18	Newcastle Knights	Sun 7 Jul 2013, 3:00pm AEST	Mackay Stadium
18	Canterbury Bankstown Bulldogs	39–0	Melbourne Storm	Sun 14 Jul 2013, 3:00pm AEST	Stadium Australia
19		BYE
20	Canterbury Bankstown Bulldogs	40–12	Parramatta Eels	Fri 26 Jul 2013, 7:35pm AEST	Stadium Australia
21	St. George Illawarra Dragons	20–39	Canterbury Bankstown Bulldogs	Mon 5 Aug 2013, 7:00pm AEST	Win Jubilee
22	Canterbury Bankstown Bulldogs	16–28	Gold Coast Titans	Mon 12 Aug 2013, 7:00pm AEST	Stadium Australia
23	Canberra Raiders	18–28	Canterbury Bankstown Bulldogs	Sat 17 Aug 2013, 3:05 AEST	Canberra Stadium
24	South Sydney Rabbitohs	26–20	Canterbury Bankstown Bulldogs	Fri 23 Aug 2013, 7:35pm AEST	Stadium Australia
25	Canterbury Bankstown Bulldogs	34–14	Penrith Panthers	Sat 31 Aug 2013, 5:30pm AEST	Centerbet Stadium
26	Brisbane Broncos	16–11	Canterbury Bankstown Bulldogs	Thur 5 Sep 2013, 7:45pm AEST	Suncorp stadium
Finals wk 1	Canterbury Bankstown Bulldogs	6–22	Newcastle Knights	Sun 15 Sep 2013, 4:00pm AEST	Stadium Australia

== Squad ==
2013 Canterbury Bulldogs Season
First team squad			Coaching staff
Harlan Alaalatoa – SR; Ben Barba – FB, FE; Mitch Brown – FB, WG, CE; Tim Browne – SR, PR; Greg Eastwood – SR, LK; Michael Ennis – HK; Dale Finucane – LK; James Graham – PR; Dene Halatau – LK, HK, CE, SR; Trent Hodkinson – HB; Krisnan Inu – CE, WG; Josh Jackson – SR; Sam Kasiano – PR	Kris Keating – FE, HB; David Klemmer – PR; Tim Lafai – CE; Leilani Latu – PR; Drury Low – WG, FB, CE; Josh Morris – WG, CE, FB; Junior Palau – PR; Sam Perrett; Frank Pritchard – SR; Josh Reynolds – HB; Joel Romelo – HK; Martin Taupau – PR; Aiden Tolman – PR, SR	Steve Turner – WG; Tony Williams – LK, SR	Head coach: Des Hasler; Jim Dymock – Assistant Coach; Harry Harris – High Performance Coach; Tony Grimaldi – Head Conditioner; Tony Ayoub – Physiotherapist; Dr Joe Lombardo – Club Doctor; John Novak – Head of Mind Management Brett Kimmorley – Specialist Coach; Fred Ciraldo – Team Manager; Garry Carden – Assistant Strength & Conditioning Coach; Steve McCullagh – Assistant Physiotherapist; Larry Britton – Head Trainer; Dr Hugh Hazzard – Medical Consultant; Andy Patmore – NYC Coach & Manager Coaching and Development; Barry Ward – NSW Cup Coach Legend: (c) Captain(s); (vc) Vice-captain(s); Injured

== See also ==
- List of Canterbury-Bankstown Bulldogs seasons
