= 2012 South Sydney Rabbitohs season =

- NRL rank: First Grade
- 2012 record: Wins: 16; draws: 0; losses: 8
- Points scored: For: 559; against: 438

Team information
- CEO: Shane Richardson
- Coach: Michael Maguire
- Captain: Roy Asotasi Sam Burgess Michael Crocker Matt King John Sutton
- Stadium: ANZ Stadium
- Avg. attendance: 18,904
- High attendance: 35,221 v Canterbury, Rd 6

Top scorers
- Tries: Andrew Everingham (17)
- Goals: Adam Reynolds (97)
- Points: Adam Reynolds (208)
← 2011	2013 →

The 2012 South Sydney Rabbitohs season was the 103rd in the club's history. They competed in the NRL's 2012 Telstra Premiersip under rookie coach Michael Maguire and finished the regular season 3rd (out of 16), Having made the finals for the 2nd since 1989, the Rabbitohs then came to within one game of the 2012 NRL Grand final but were knocked out of contention by eventual grand finalists the Canterbury-Bankstown Bulldogs.

== Pre-season ==
The Rabbitohs played three pre-season games in 2012. The Rabbitohs were initially planned to play the Cronulla-Sutherland Sharks at the fourth annual Return to Redfern, then the Warrington Wolves in Coffs Harbour. However, due to a scheduling clash with Warrington's first season match, the games were rescheduled.
The changes meant the clash with Warrington would need to be in late January, and Redfern Oval played host to its first international match in the re-developed configuration. At the clash, in front of a sold-out crowd, the head coach, Michael Maguire announced the new captaincy arrangement, and presented the 2012 squad. On the field, Warrington held onto a late comeback by South Sydney to win 34 points to 28.
A fortnight later, at the conclusion of the annual 'Camp Rabbitoh' pre-season training camp in Coffs Harbour, the Rabbitohs played the 2011 Grand Finalists, the New Zealand Warriors, in which South Sydney were again beaten by 8 points.
In the final pre-season clash, the Rabbitohs took on the St. George Illawarra Dragons in the annual Charity Shield clash at ANZ Stadium. The match, in which South Sydney were defeated by 6 points, drew over 21,000 fans, and was again the only pre-season clash to be televised.

Date	Round	Opponent	Venue	Score	Attendance	Report
28 January	Return to Redfern	Warrington Wolves	ATP Performance Centre, Redfern	28–34	5,000	
11 February	Coffs Harbour Trial	New Zealand Warriors	BCU International Stad., Coffs Harbour	14–22	5,376	
18 February	Charity Shield	St. George Illawarra Dragons	ANZ Stadium, Sydney	12–18	21,398	
Legend: Win 13+ Win Loss 13+ Loss Draw

== Regular season ==
While the Rabbitohs got off to a rocky start to 2012 under new coach Michael Maguire, losing 3 of their first 4 games. With the heir-apparent to the fullback position, Nathan Merritt, out for the first 7 rounds, and a struggling Dylan Farrell playing out of position, coach Maguire moved Greg Inglis to fullback in the 40–24 thrashing of Penrith, setting their season alight. From the next 17 games, South Sydney managed to lose only 4, and all bar one were closely fought losses, won in the dying minutes of the game.

In Round 19, South Sydney fought out one of the wins of the season, pipping the Sydney Roosters with 2 back-to-back tries within the last 3 minutes of the game, a feat which the Roosters had pulled in Round 1 over South Sydney. The team experienced a minor hiccup losing back-to-back games in Round 23/24 for only the second time all year. South Sydney bounced back however, with an inspiring victory over the Parramatta Eels in which Greg Inglis posted one of the best individual performances of all time, as measured by Sportsdata's CVR Ratings. The Rabbitohs then wrapped up their first Top 4 spot since 1989 with a win over Newcastle.

Date	Round	Opponent	Venue	Score	Attendance	Report
Mon 5 Mar	1	Sydney Roosters	ANZ Stadium, Sydney	20–24	18,278	
Sun 11 Mar	2	Melbourne Storm	AAMI Park, Melbourne	10–24	15,872	
Sun 18 Mar	3	Penrith Panthers	Centrebet Stadium, Penrith	40–24	13,876	
Fri 23 Mar	4	Brisbane Broncos	nib Stadium, Perth	12–20	15,599	
Sun 1 Apr	5	Wests Tigers	Allianz Stadium, Sydney	17–16	25,604	
Fri 6 Apr	6	Canterbury-Bankstown Bulldogs	ANZ Stadium, Sydney	20–10	35,221	
Sun 15 Apr	7	New Zealand Warriors	Mt. Smart Stadium, New Zealand	22–44	15,378	
		Representative Weekend				
Sat 28 Apr	8	North Queensland Cowboys	ANZ Stadium, Sydney	20–16	12,213	
Mon 7 May	9	Cronulla Sharks	ANZ Stadium, Sydney	34–28	12,201	
	10	BYE				
Sun 20 May	11	St. George Illawarra Dragons	WIN Jubilee Oval, Sydney	19–18	14,894	
Fri 25 May	12	Canberra Raiders	ANZ Stadium, Sydney	36–18	10,054	
Sat 2 Jun	13	Canterbury-Bankstown Bulldogs	ANZ Stadium, Sydney	18–23	19,439	
	14	BYE				
Sat 16 Jun	15	Parramatta Eels	ANZ Stadium, Sydney	24–6	14,212	
Fri 22 Jun	16	Brisbane Broncos	Suncorp Stadium, Brisbane	12–26	33,602	
Sun 1 Jul	17	Penrith Panthers	ANZ Stadium, Sydney	38–12	13,096	
Sun 8 Jul	18	Newcastle Knights	ANZ Stadium, Sydney	34–14	16,104	
Mon 16 Jul	19	Sydney Roosters	Allianz Stadium, Sydney	24–22	19,906	
Sat 21 Jul	20	St. George Illawarra Dragons	ANZ Stadium, Sydney	36–14	21,071	
Sun 29 Jul	21	Wests Tigers	ANZ Stadium, Sydney	32–6	29,863	
Sun 5 Aug	22	Gold Coast Titans	Skilled Park, Gold Coast	22–18	20,187	
Fri 10 Aug	23	Manly-Warringah Sea Eagles	Bluetongue Stadium, Central Coast	6–23	17,947	
Sat 18 Aug	24	Cronulla-Sutherland Sharks	Toyota Stadium, Sydney	7–20	16,423	
Sun 26 Aug	25	Parramatta Eels	ANZ Stadium, Sydney	36–6	24,121	
Fri 31 Aug	26	Newcastle Knights	Hunter Stadium, Newcastle	18–6	24,127	
Legend: Win 13+ Win Loss 13+ Loss Draw Bye

== Finals Series ==
After finishing the season proper in third place, the Rabbitohs travelled to Melbourne to take on the second placed Storm. Souths put in an uncharacteristically poor performance, with Melbourne rolling Souths 24–6, with the only Rabbitohs try going to forward Eddy Pettybourne, for his first try of the year.
Despite the loss, South Sydney proceeded through to an Elimination final against the Canberra Raiders at ANZ Stadium. Against a home crowd, Souths turned in a dominant performance, piling on 38 points; tries going to Adam Reynolds, Sam Burgess, Dylan Farrell, and a double to Andrew Everingham. Additionally, a rare penalty try was awarded to Greg Inglis, after Canberra's Blake Ferguson tackled Inglis without the ball as he was about to receive an offload from forward Luke Burgess. During the game, halfback and Rookie of the Year Adam Reynolds kicked 7/8 goals to become only the second South Sydney player to score more than 200 points in a season.
Souths then moved on to a Grand Final Qualifier against the Canterbury-Bankstown Bulldogs, played in front of a bumper crowd of more than 70,000. The Rabbitohs scored their only try through Issac Luke, however after halfback Adam Reynolds left the field with a hamstring injury, the momentum of the game swung and the Bulldogs surged ahead to end the Rabbitohs season.

Date	Round	Opponent	Venue	Score	Attendance	Report
Sat 8 Sep	Qualifying Final	Melbourne Storm	AAMI Park, Melbourne	6–24	19,750	
Sat 15 Sep	Semi-final	Canberra Raiders	ANZ Stadium, Sydney	38–16	35,874	
Sat 22 Sep	Preliminary Final	Canterbury-Bankstown Bulldogs	ANZ Stadium, Sydney	8–32	70,354	
Legend: Win 13+ Win Loss 13+ Loss Draw Bye

== Ladder ==
2012 NRL season
Pos	Team	Pld	W	D	L	B	PF	PA	PD	Pts
1	Canterbury-Bankstown Bulldogs	24	18	0	6	2	568	369	+199	40
2	Melbourne Storm (P)	24	17	0	7	2	579	361	+218	38
3	South Sydney Rabbitohs	24	16	0	8	2	559	438	+121	36
4	Manly Warringah Sea Eagles	24	16	0	8	2	497	403	+94	36
5	North Queensland Cowboys	24	15	0	9	2	597	445	+152	34
6	Canberra Raiders	24	13	0	11	2	545	536	+9	30
7	Cronulla-Sutherland Sharks	24	12	1	11	2	445	441	+4	29
8	Brisbane Broncos	24	12	0	12	2	481	447	+34	28
9	St. George Illawarra Dragons	24	11	0	13	2	405	438	-33	26
10	Wests Tigers	24	11	0	13	2	506	551	-45	26
11	Gold Coast Titans	24	10	0	14	2	449	477	-28	24
12	Newcastle Knights	24	10	0	14	2	448	488	-40	24
13	Sydney Roosters	24	8	1	15	2	462	626	-164	21
14	New Zealand Warriors	24	8	0	16	2	497	609	-112	20
15	Penrith Panthers	24	8	0	16	2	409	575	-166	20
16	Parramatta Eels	24	6	0	18	2	431	674	-243	16

== Statistics ==
Player	Games	Tries	Goals	Field goals	Total points
Neccrom Areaiiti	1	0	0	0	0
Roy Asotasi	9	2	0	0	8
George Burgess	3	0	0	0	0
Luke Burgess	15	0	0	0	0
Sam Burgess	19	4	0	0	16
Ryan Carr	0	0	0	0	0
Jason Clark	22	1	0	0	4
Shaune Corrigan	8	0	0	0	0
Michael Crocker	23	2	0	0	8
Andrew Everingham	22	15	0	0	60
Dylan Farrell	23	7	0	0	28
Scott Geddes	12	0	0	0	0
Justin Hunt	9	5	0	0	20
Greg Inglis	19	11	0	1	45
Matt King	19	3	0	0	12
Ben Lowe	16	1	0	0	4
Issac Luke	19	4	3	0	22
Chris McQueen	20	5	0	0	20
Nathan Merritt	17	14	0	0	56
Nathan Peats	15	5	0	0	20
Eddy Pettybourne	20	0	0	0	0
Adam Reynolds	24	2	87	2	184
Josh Starling	3	0	0	0	0
John Sutton	24	4	0	0	16
Fetuli Talanoa	2	0	0	0	0
David Taylor	23	9	0	0	36
David Tyrrell	19	0	0	0	0

== Transfers ==
Gains

Player	Gained From
Matt King	Warrington Wolves
Justin Hunt	Redcliffe Dolphins
Ryan Carr	Redcliffe Dolphins
Andrew Everingham	Western Suburbs Magpies
Michael Maguire (Coach)	Wigan Warriors

Losses

Player	Lost To
Chris Sandow	Parramatta Eels
Shannan McPherson	Salford City Reds
Luke Stuart	Retired
Rhys Wesser	Retired
John Lang (Coach)	Retired
Ben Ross	Cronulla-Sutherland Sharks
Beau Falloon	Gold Coast Titans

== Current squad ==
The following list comprises players who are in the Rabbitohs full-time first-grade squad for the 2012 season in the NRL Telstra Premiership.

South Sydney Rabbitohs
First team squad			Coaching staff
Neccrom Areaiiti – PR; Roy Asotasi – PR (c); George Burgess – PR; Luke Burgess – PR; Sam Burgess – LK, SR, PR (c); Ryan Carr – HB, HK; Jason Clark – LK, SR, PR; Shaune Corrigan – CE, WG; Michael Crocker – LK, SR, PR (c); Andrew Everingham – WG	Dylan Farrell – CE, WG; Scott Geddes – PR; Justin Hunt – FE, HB, FB; Greg Inglis – CE; Curtis Johnston – WG; Blake Judd; Matt King – CE (c); Ben Lowe – LK, SR; Issac Luke – HK (gk); Brendan McKinnon – HK	Chris McQueen – WG, SR; Nathan Merritt – FB, WG; Nathan Peats – HK, SR; Eddy Pettybourne – SR, PR; Adam Reynolds – HB (gk); James Roberts – FB, WG; John Sutton – FE, LK (c); Fetuli Talanoa – WG, CE; Dave Taylor – SR, PR; Dave Tyrrell – SR	Head coach: Michael Maguire; Assistant coaches: Kurt Wrigley; Wayne Collins; Troy Thompson; Legend: (c) Captain(s); (vc) Vice-captain(s); (gk) Goal kicker; Injured; Updated: 21 May 2012; Source(s): Rabbitohs Squad, Rugby League Project

== Player statistics ==
Player	Appearances	Tries	Goals	Field Goals	Total Points
–	–	–	–	–	–

== Representative honours ==
Player	All Stars	Anzac Test	Pacific Test	City / Country	State of Origin 1	State of Origin 2	State of Origin 3	Four Nations
