= 2012 North Queensland Cowboys season =

Coordinates: 19°18′58″S 146°42′43″E

- NRL Rank: 5th
- Play-off result: Lost Semi Final (v Manly Sea Eagles, 12-22)
- 2012 record: Wins: 15; draws: 0; losses: 9
- Points scored: For: 597; against: 445

Team information
- CEO: Peter Jourdain
- Coach: Neil Henry
- Captain: Johnathan Thurston Matthew Scott
- Stadium: Dairy Farmers Stadium
- Avg. attendance: 14,637
- High attendance: 21,307 (vs. Brisbane Broncos, Finals Week 1)

Top scorers
- Tries: Ashley Graham (21)
- Goals: Johnathan Thurston (90)
- Points: Johnathan Thurston (192)
← 2011	2013 →

The 2012 North Queensland Cowboys season was the 18th in the club's history. The team is based in Townsville, Queensland, Australia. Coached by Neil Henry and co-captained by Johnathan Thurston and Matthew Scott, they competed in the National Rugby League's 2012 Telstra Premiership. They finished the regular season in 5th place and were knocked out in the second week of the finals by the Manly-Warringah Sea Eagles, for the second year in a row.

== Season summary ==
The Cowboys were aiming to build on its 7th-place finish in 2011, after a near-wooden spoon 2010 season only prevented by the Melbourne Storm salary cap breach, with a strong 2012 season.

The season did not start well, with the Cowboys producing one of their worst performances in almost ten years as they lost 18–0 to the Gold Coast Titans at home, with a completion rate of only 35%, the worst on record. In Round 2, the Cowboys defeated the Brisbane Broncos at Suncorp Stadium, with Matthew Bowen scoring the match-winning try on his 30th birthday.

Despite the opening loss, the Cowboys went on to produce a consistent, never once dropping out of the top eight from Round 3 onwards. They records big victories over the Parramatta Eels in Round 3 (42–6), the Sydney Roosters in Round 7 (50–12), the St George Illawarra Dragons in Round 9 (30–6), the Canberra Raiders in Round 16 (40–18) and the Warriors in Round 23 (52–12). They ended the regular season on four game winning streak, finishing in 5th place, their highest finish since 2007.

In Week 1 of the finals, the Cowboys defeated the Brisbane Broncos 33–16, with Michael Morgan scoring a hat-trick, the first halfback to do so in a finals game. It was their third win over Brisbane in 2012. A week later they were eliminated by Manly in controversial circumstances.

Club legend Aaron Payne announced his retirement at the end of the 2012 season, he became a life member at the club after playing his 200th game for the Cowboys. Earlier in the season, Matthew Bowen became the first player to play 250 NRL games for North Queensland.

=== Milestones ===
- Round 1: Kane Linnett and Robert Lui made their debuts for the club.
- Round 1: Mosese Pangai made his NRL debut.
- Round 6: Aaron Payne played his 200th game for the club.
- Round 6: Johnathan Thurston played his 150th game for the club.
- Round 6: Johnathan Thurston scored his 1000th point for the club.
- Round 8: Gavin Cooper played his 50th game for the club.
- Round 17: Anthony Mitchell made his debut for the club.
- Round 21: Dallas Johnson played his 200th NRL game.
- Round 25: Blake Leary made his NRL debut.
- Finals Week 1: Matthew Bowen played his 250th for the club, the first player to do so.
- Finals Week 2: Dallas Johnson played his 50th game for the club.

== Squad List ==
North Queensland Cowboys NRL Squad 2012
First team squad			Coaching staff
Scott Bolton – SR; Matthew Bowen – FB; Gavin Cooper – SR; Kalifa Faifai Loa – WG; Ashley Graham – WG; Glenn Hall – SR; Luke Harlen – PR; Sam Hoare – PR; Dane Hogan – LK; Dallas Johnson – LK; Ben Jones – FE	Blake Leary – SR; Kane Linnett – CE; Robert Lui – HB; Tyson Martin – SR; Anthony Mitchell – HK; Michael Morgan – FE; Mosese Pangai – CE; Cory Paterson – SR; Aaron Payne – HK; Joel Riethmuller – LK; Matthew Scott (c) – PR	James Segeyaro – HK; Ashton Sims – PR; Tariq Sims – SR; James Tamou – PR; Brent Tate – CE; Jason Taumalolo – LK; Ray Thompson – FE; Ricky Thorby – PR; Johnathan Thurston (c) – HB; Antonio Winterstein – WG	Head coach: Neil Henry; Assistant coaches: Terry Matterson (assistant coach); Peter Ryan (assistant coach); Paul Bowman (High Performance Manager); Glen Murphy (head conditioner); Legend: (c) Captain(s); (vc) Vice-captain(s); Updated: 29 July 2012; Source(s): Player Profiles, NRL Team,

== Squad Movement ==
=== 2012 Gains ===
Player	Signed from	Until end of
Luke Harlen	Northern Pride	2012
Kane Linnett	Sydney Roosters	2013
Robert Lui	Wests Tigers	2013
Anthony Mitchell	Sydney Roosters (mid-season)	2013

=== 2012 Losses ===
Player	Signed To	Until end of
Isaak Ah Mau	Redcliffe Dolphins	2013
Leeson Ah Mau	St George Illawarra Dragons	2013
Clint Amos	Retired	-
Michael Bani	Canberra Raiders	2012
Jack Cooper	Cairns District Rugby League	2012
Shannon Gallant	Berkeley Eagles	2012
Dylan Smith	Mackay Cutters	2012
Willie Tonga	Parramatta Eels	2013
Will Tupou	Western Force	2013

== Ladder ==
2012 NRL season
Pos	Team	Pld	W	D	L	B	PF	PA	PD	Pts
1	Canterbury-Bankstown Bulldogs	24	18	0	6	2	568	369	+199	40
2	Melbourne Storm (P)	24	17	0	7	2	579	361	+218	38
3	South Sydney Rabbitohs	24	16	0	8	2	559	438	+121	36
4	Manly Warringah Sea Eagles	24	16	0	8	2	497	403	+94	36
5	North Queensland Cowboys	24	15	0	9	2	597	445	+152	34
6	Canberra Raiders	24	13	0	11	2	545	536	+9	30
7	Cronulla-Sutherland Sharks	24	12	1	11	2	445	441	+4	29
8	Brisbane Broncos	24	12	0	12	2	481	447	+34	28
9	St. George Illawarra Dragons	24	11	0	13	2	405	438	-33	26
10	Wests Tigers	24	11	0	13	2	506	551	-45	26
11	Gold Coast Titans	24	10	0	14	2	449	477	-28	24
12	Newcastle Knights	24	10	0	14	2	448	488	-40	24
13	Sydney Roosters	24	8	1	15	2	462	626	-164	21
14	New Zealand Warriors	24	8	0	16	2	497	609	-112	20
15	Penrith Panthers	24	8	0	16	2	409	575	-166	20
16	Parramatta Eels	24	6	0	18	2	431	674	-243	16

== Fixtures ==
=== Pre-season ===
Date	Round	Opponent	Venue	Score	Tries	Goals	Attendance
4 February	Trial 1	Brisbane Broncos	Dolphin Oval	22 – 28	Bolton, Segeyaro, Thompson, Ulugia	Foster (2/2), Faifai Loa (1/2)	4,500
11 February	Trial 2	St George Illawarra Dragons	NIB Stadium	18 – 12	Cooper, Graham, Linnett, Winterstein	Graham (1)	8,588
18 February	Trial 3	Gold Coast Titans	Virgin Australia Stadium	28 – 36	Faifai Loa (2), Pangai (2), Thurston	Thurston (3/4), Cooper (1/1)	-
Legend: Win Loss Draw

=== Regular season ===
Date	Round	Opponent	Venue	Score	Tries	Goals	Attendance
3 March	Round 1	Gold Coast Titans	Dairy Farmers Stadium	0 – 18	-	-	16,311
9 March	Round 2	Brisbane Broncos	Suncorp Stadium	26 – 28	Bowen (2), Johnson, Segeyaro, Tate	Thurston (4/5)	43,171
17 March	Round 3	Parramatta Eels	Dairy Farmers Stadium	42 – 6	Graham (3), Bowen, Cooper, Linnett, Scott, Taumalolo	Thurston (5/8)	8,239
24 March	Round 4	Cronulla Sharks	Dairy Farmers Stadium	14 – 20	Bowen, Cooper, Graham	Thurston (1/4)	11,364
2 April	Round 5	Canberra Raiders	Canberra Stadium	22 – 6	Graham (2), Tate, Thompson	Thurston (3/4)	12,135
8 April	Round 6	Melbourne Storm	Dairy Farmers Stadium	18 – 42	Bowen, Cooper, Tamou	Thurston (3/3)	20,206
14 April	Round 7	Sydney Roosters	TIO Stadium	50 – 12	Bowen (2), Taumalolo (2), Winterstein (2), Faifai Loa, Graham, Thompson	Thurston (6/8), Bowen (1/1)	10,008
28 April	Round 8	South Sydney Rabbitohs	ANZ Stadium	16 – 20	Graham (2), Segeyaro	Thurston (2/3)	12,213
4 May	Round 9	St George Illawarra Dragons	Dairy Farmers Stadium	30 – 6	Bowen, Linnett, T Sims, Tate, Thompson	Thurston (3/6), Bowen (2/2)	15,006
12 May	Round 10	Newcastle Knights	Hunter Stadium	32 – 12	Graham (2), Cooper, Morgan, Thompson	Thurston (6/6)	18,191
19 May	Round 11	Penrith Panthers	Dairy Farmers Stadium	30 – 28	Bowen, Cooper, Ashley Graham, A Sims, Winterstein	Bowen (5/7)	11,648
27 May	Round 12	Wests Tigers	Campbelltown Stadium	18 – 26	Ashley Graham, Glenn Hall, Winterstein	Thurston (3/3)	13,059
1 June	Round 13	Gold Coast Titans	Skilled Park	12 – 28	Paterson, Taumalolo	Thurston (2/2)	12,092
	Round 14	Bye					
15 June	Round 15	Brisbane Broncos	Dairy Farmers Stadium	12 – 0	Cooper, Linnett	Thurston (2/2)	20,367
23 June	Round 16	Canberra Raiders	Dairy Farmers Stadium	40 – 18	Hall (2), Bolton, Graham, Linnett, Thompson, Winterstein	Thurston (5/6), Bowen (1/1)	14,344
1 July	Round 17	Warriors	Mt Smart Stadium	18 – 35	Cooper, Graham, Linnett	Bowen (3/3)	15,374
	Round 18	Bye					
14 July	Round 19	Melbourne Storm	AAMI Park	20 – 16	Linnett (2), Tate	Thurston (4/4)	10,688
23 July	Round 20	Wests Tigers	Dairy Farmers Stadium	29 – 16	Cooper, Faifai Loa, Hall, Mitchell, Tate	Thurston (4/5), Bowen (1 FG)	12,357
28 July	Round 21	Canterbury Bulldogs	ANZ Stadium	18 – 32	Linnett, Thurston, Winterstein	Thurston (3/3)	18,652
4 August	Round 22	Manly Sea Eagles	Dairy Farmers Stadium	6 – 8	Linnett	Thurston (1/1)	14,401
11 August	Round 23	Warriors	Dairy Farmers Stadium	52 – 12	Graham (3), Bowen, Cooper, Linnett, Payne, Tate, Winterstein	Thurston (8/9)	13,616
20 August	Round 24	St George Illawarra Dragons	WIN Stadium	32 – 22	Linnett (2), Bowen, Graham, Thurston	Thurston (6/6)	9,245
25 August	Round 25	Newcastle Knights	Dairy Farmers Stadium	22 – 14	Bowen, Tate, Thurston	Thurston (5/5)	15,119
2 September	Round 26	Cronulla Sharks	Toyota Stadium	36 – 22	Graham (2), Cooper, Segeyaro, Tate, Taumalolo	Thurston (6/7)	16,829
Legend: Win Loss Draw Bye

=== Finals ===
Date	Round	Opponent	Venue	Score	Tries	Goals	Attendance
8 September	Qualifying Final	Brisbane Broncos	Dairy Farmers Stadium	33 – 16	Morgan (3), Bowen, Tate	Thurston (6/7), Bowen (1 FG)	21,307
14 September	Semi Final	Manly Sea Eagles	Allianz Stadium	22 – 12	Tamou, Winterstein	Thurston (2/2)	16,678
Legend: Win Loss Draw Bye

== Statistics ==
Name	App	T	G	FG	Pts
Scott Bolton	14	1	-	-	4
Matthew Bowen	26	13	12	2	78
Gavin Cooper	26	10	-	-	40
Kalifa Faifai Loa	6	2	-	-	8
Ashley Graham	24	21	-	-	84
Glenn Hall	23	4	-	-	16
Dallas Johnson	26	1	-	-	4
Blake Leary	1	-	-	-	-
Kane Linnett	24	12	-	-	48
Robert Lui	1	-	-	-	-
Anthony Mitchell	8	1	-	-	4
Michael Morgan	13	4	-	-	16
Mosese Pangai	1	-	-	-	-
Cory Paterson	3	1	-	-	4
Aaron Payne	25	1	-	-	4
Joel Riethmuller	10	-	-	-	-
Matthew Scott	18	1	-	-	4
James Segeyaro	14	3	-	-	12
Ashton Sims	25	1	-	-	4
Tariq Sims	7	1	-	-	4
James Tamou	24	2	-	-	8
Brent Tate	23	9	-	-	36
Jason Taumalolo	17	5	-	-	20
Ray Thompson	18	5	-	-	20
Ricky Thorby	15	-	-	-	-
Johnathan Thurston	24	3	90	-	192
Antonio Winterstein	26	8	-	-	32
Totals		109	102	2	642

== Representatives ==
The following players have played a representative match in 2012

	All Stars match	City vs Country	ANZAC Test	State of Origin 1	State of Origin 2	State of Origin 3
Matthew Bowen	Indigenous All Stars	-	-	-	-	-
Cory Paterson	Indigenous All Stars	-	-	-	-	-
Aaron Payne	NRL All Stars	-	-	-	-	-
Matthew Scott	-	-	-	Queensland	Queensland	Queensland
Tariq Sims	-	Country	-	-	-	-
James Tamou	-	-	Australia	New South Wales	New South Wales	New South Wales
Brent Tate	NRL All Stars	-	-	Queensland	Queensland	Queensland
Johnathan Thurston	Indigenous All Stars	-	Australia	Queensland	Queensland	Queensland

== Honours ==
=== League ===
- Dally M Five-Eighth of the Year: Johnathan Thurston
- RLIF Five-Eighth of the Year: Johnathan Thurston
- NRL Top Tryscorer: Ashley Graham
- NYC Team of the Year: Chris Grevsmuhl

=== Club ===
- Paul Bowman Medal: Johnathan Thurston
- Player's Player: James Tamou
- Club Person of the Year: Johnathan Thurston
- Rookie of the Year: Jason Taumalolo
- Most Improved: Kane Linnett
- NYC Player of the Year: Zac Santo

== Feeder Clubs ==
=== National Youth Competition ===
- North Queensland Cowboys - 13th, missed finals

=== Queensland Cup ===
- Mackay Cutters - 8th, missed finals
- Northern Pride - 7th, missed finals
