= 2012 Brisbane Broncos season =

Coordinates: 27°27′53″S 153°0′34″E

- NRL rank: 8th
- Play-off result: Lost Elimination Final (North Queensland Cowboys, 16-33)
- 2014 record: Wins: 12; losses: 12
- Points scored: For: 481; against: 447

Team information
- CEO: Paul White
- Coach: Anthony Griffin
- Captain: Sam Thaiday
- Stadium: Suncorp Stadium
- Avg. attendance: 33,377
- Agg. attendance: 400,528
- High attendance: 43,171 (Round 2 v Cowboys)
- Low attendance: 22,626 (Round 21 v Eels)

Top scorers
- Tries: Alex Glenn (13)
- Goals: Peter Wallace (36)
- Points: Peter Wallace (89)
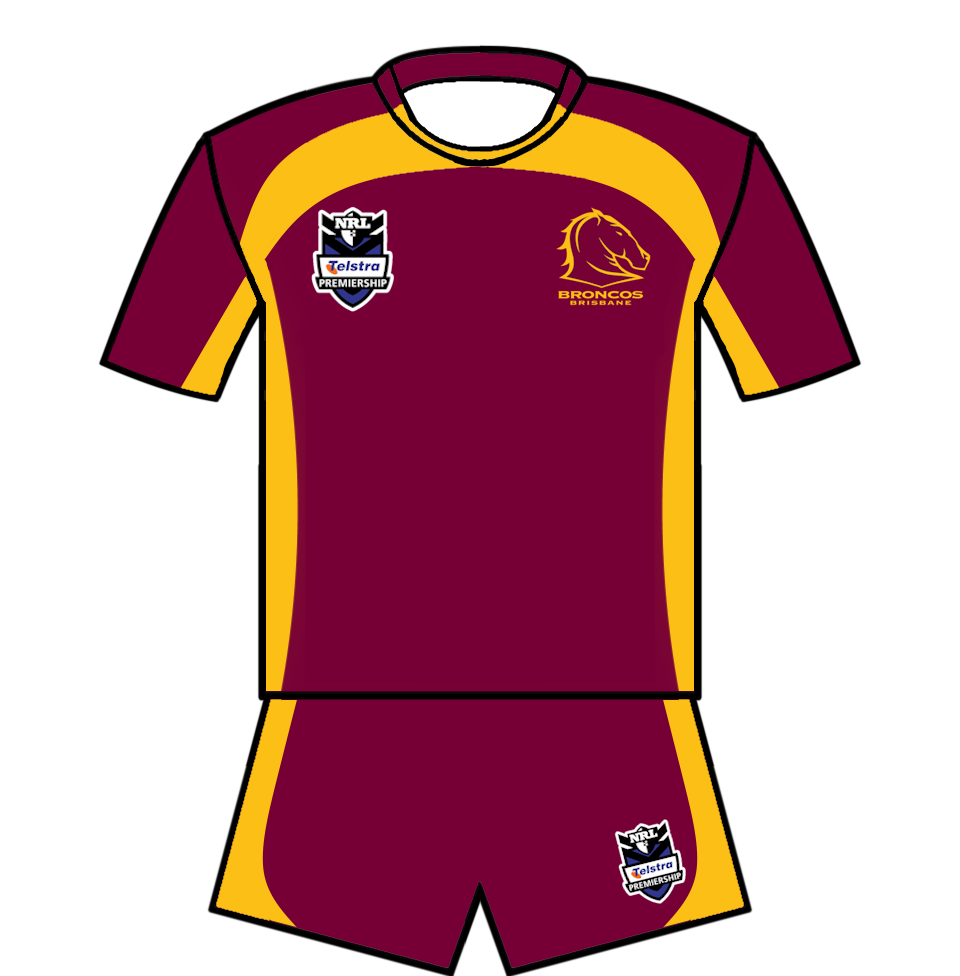
Home colours
← 2011	List of seasons	2013 →

The 2012 Brisbane Broncos season was the 25th in the club's history. Coached by Anthony Griffin and captained by Sam Thaiday, they competed in the NRL's 2012 Telstra Premiership, finishing the regular season eighth (out of sixteen) to make it into the finals. The Broncos were then knocked out of contention in the first game of the finals against the North Queensland Cowboys. So began the Broncos' longest ever premiership drought.

== Season summary ==
=== Milestones ===
- Round 1: Nick Slyney made his debut for the club, after previously playing for the North Queensland Cowboys.
- Round 3: Sam Thaiday played his 150th career game.
- Round 4: Josh McGuire played his fiftieth career game.
- Round 8: Josh Hoffman played his fiftieth career game.
- Round 9: Ben Hunt played his fiftieth career game and Peter Wallace his 100th game for the club.
- Round 10: Luke Capewell made his debut for the club, after previously playing for the South Sydney Rabbitohs and Gold Coast Titans.
- Round 10: Matt Gillett played his fiftieth career game.
- Round 12: Ben Hannant played his 100th game for the club.
- Round 13: Gerard Beale played his fiftieth career game.
- Round 14: Brendon Gibb, Lachlan Maranta and Jarrod Wallace made their debuts for the club.
- Round 14: Lachlan Maranta scored his first career try and Ben Te'o played his 100th career game.
- Round 16: Petero Civoniceva played his 300th career game.
- Round 17: Aaron Whitchurch made his debut for the club.
- Round 17: Aaron Whitchurch scored his first career try.
- Round 20: Corey Parker played his 250th career game.
- Round 21: Ben Hannant played his 150th career game.
- Round 26: Andrew McCullough played his 100th career game.
- Elimination Final: Justin Hodges played his 200th career game.

== Squad information ==
As of 8 September 2012

Cap.	Nat.	Player	Position	First Broncos game	Previous First Grade RL club
87	(Australia)	Petero Civoniceva	Prop	1998	(Australia) Penrith Panthers
100	(Australia)	Justin Hodges	Centre	2000	(Australia) Sydney Roosters
106	(Australia)	Corey Parker	Lock	2001	—N/a
128	(Australia)	Sam Thaiday (c)	Second-row	2003	—N/a
144	(Australia)	Ben Hannant	Prop	2006	(Australia) Canterbury-Bankstown Bulldogs
158	(Australia)	Peter Wallace	Halfback	2008	Penrith Panthers
163	(Australia)	Andrew McCullough	Hooker	2008	—N/a
165	(New Zealand)	Josh Hoffman	Fullback	2008	—N/a
169	(Australia)	Jharal Yow Yeh	Wing	2009	—N/a
171	(Samoa)	Ben Te'o	Second-row	2009	(Australia) Wests Tigers
172	(New Zealand)	Alex Glenn	Second-row	2009	—N/a
174	(Australia)	Josh McGuire	Prop	2009	—N/a
176	(New Zealand)	Gerard Beale	Wing	2009	—N/a
177	(Australia)	Dale Copley	Wing	2009	—N/a
178	(Australia)	Ben Hunt	Hooker	2009	—N/a
180	(Tonga)	David Hala	Prop	2009	—N/a
181	(Australia)	Scott Anderson	Prop	2010	(Australia) Melbourne Storm
182	(Australia)	Matt Gillett	Second-row	2010	—N/a
183	(Australia)	Mitchell Dodds	Prop	2010	—N/a
184	(Australia)	Corey Norman	Five-eighth	2010	—N/a
186	(Samoa)	Dunamis Lui	Lock	2010	—N/a
190	(England)	Jack Reed	Centre	2011	—N/a
191	(Papua New Guinea)	Kurt Baptiste	Hooker	2011	—N/a
193	(Australia)	Nick Slyney	Second-row	2012	(Australia) North Queensland Cowboys
194	(Australia)	Luke Capewell	Fullback	2012	(Australia) Gold Coast Titans
195	(Australia)	Lachlan Maranta	Wing	2012	—N/a
196	(Australia)	Jarrod Wallace	Prop	2012	—N/a
197	(Australia)	Brendon Gibb	Second-row	2012	—N/a
198	(Australia)	Aaron Whitchurch	Second-row	2012	—N/a
–	(Australia)	Nathanael Barnes	Wing	Yet to debut	—N/a
–	(Australia)	Chris Binge	Hooker	Yet to debut	—N/a
–	(Australia)	Stephen Coombe	Prop	Yet to debut	—N/a
–	(Australia)	Mitchell Frei	Second-row	Yet to debut	—N/a
–	(Australia)	Paul Ivan	Second-row	Yet to debut	—N/a
–	(New Zealand)	Jordan Kahu	Centre	Yet to debut	—N/a
–	(Australia)	Sam Martin	Second-row	Yet to debut	—N/a
–	(Australia)	Matt Smith	Prop	Yet to debut	—N/a
–	(Australia)	Daniel Wallace	Centre	Yet to debut	—N/a

== Squad changes ==
=== Transfers in ===
Date	Position	Player	From	Year/s	Ref.
7 July 2011	Prop	Nick Slyney	Redcliffe Dolphins	2 Years	
25 July 2011	Fullback	Luke Capewell	Gold Coast Titans	1 Year	
26 July 2011	Prop	Petero Civoniceva	Penrith Panthers	1 Year	

=== Transfers out ===
Date	Position	Player	To	Year/s	Ref.
28 March 2011	Five-eighth	Darren Lockyer	Retirement	—	
30 November 2011	Prop	Rohan Ahern	Mackay Cutters	2012	
2 December 2011	Prop	Nick Kenny	Retirement	—	
8 December 2011	Second-row	Kurtis Lingwoodock	Ipswich Jets	2012	
8 May 2012	Wing	Dane Gagai	Newcastle Knights	2 & 1/2 Years	

=== Contract extensions ===
Date	Position	Player	Year/s	Ref.
18 January 2012	Second-row	Alex Glenn	2015	
18 January 2012	Prop	David Hala	2014	
18 January 2012	Hooker	Ben Hunt	2013	
18 January 2012	Hooker	Andrew McCullough	2015	
24 February 2012	Five-eighth	Corey Norman	2013	
24 February 2012	Halfback	Peter Wallace	2014	
19 March 2012	Wing	Dane Gagai	2 Years	
18 July 2012	Head coach	Anthony Griffin	2 Years	

=== Contract lengths ===
Player	2012	2013	2014	2015	2016	Source
Gerard Beale	Brisbane Broncos	St. George Illawarra Dragons				
Ben Te'o	Brisbane Broncos	South Sydney Rabbitohs				
Petero Civoniceva	Brisbane Broncos	Retirement				
Luke Capewell	Brisbane Broncos					
Mitchell Dodds	Brisbane Broncos					
Jack Reed	Brisbane Broncos					
Scott Anderson	Brisbane Broncos					
Kurt Baptiste	Brisbane Broncos					
Dale Copley	Brisbane Broncos					
Matt Gillett	Brisbane Broncos					
Ben Hunt	Brisbane Broncos					
Dunamis Lui	Brisbane Broncos					
Corey Norman	Brisbane Broncos					
Nick Slyney	Brisbane Broncos					
David Hala	Brisbane Broncos					
Ben Hannant	Brisbane Broncos					
Justin Hodges	Brisbane Broncos					
Corey Parker	Brisbane Broncos					
Peter Wallace	Brisbane Broncos					
Alex Glenn	Brisbane Broncos					
Anthony Griffin (Coach)	Brisbane Broncos					
Josh Hoffman	Brisbane Broncos					
Andrew McCullough	Brisbane Broncos					
Josh McGuire	Brisbane Broncos					
Sam Thaiday	Brisbane Broncos					
Jharal Yow Yeh	Brisbane Broncos					

== Coaching staff ==
Role	Name
Head coach	Anthony Griffin
Assistant Coach	Allan Langer
Assistant Coach	Kristian Woolf
Skills Coach	Dan Baker
Performance Coach	Tony Guilfoyle
Performance Coach	Andrew Croll
General Manager - Football Operations	Andrew Gee
NYC Head Coach	Kurt Richards

== Fixtures ==
=== Pre-season ===
Date	Round	Opponent	Venue	Score	Tries	Goals	Attendance
Saturday, 4 February	Trial 1	North Queensland Cowboys	Dolphin Oval	28 – 22	Gagai, Gibb, Copley, Barnes, Coombe	Hunt (2), Norman (2)	4,500
Saturday, 11 February	Trial 2	Gold Coast Titans	Pizzey Park	16 – 18	Beale, Glenn, Copley	P. Wallace (2)	7,252
Saturday, 18 February	Trial 3	Melbourne Storm	North Hobart Oval	30 – 34	Glenn, Te'o, Beale, Norman, Hoffman, Gagai	P. Wallace (5)	11,752
Legend: Win Loss Draw

=== Regular season ===
Date	Round	Opponent	Venue	Score	Tries	Goals	Attendance
Friday, 2 March	Round 1	Parramatta Eels	Parramatta Stadium	18 – 6	Yow Yeh, P. Wallace, Hannant	Parker (3/3)	11,389
Friday, 9 March	Round 2	North Queensland Cowboys	Suncorp Stadium	26 – 28	Yow Yeh, McGuire, Beale, Te'o	Parker (5/5)	43,177
Friday, 16 March	Round 3	Newcastle Knights	Hunter Stadium	24 – 10	Glenn, Hodges, Beale, Gillett	P. Wallace (4/5)	23,894
Friday, 23 March	Round 4	South Sydney Rabbitohs	nib Stadium	20 – 12	Beale (2), Gillett, Hoffman	P. Wallace (2/4)	15,599
Friday, 30 March	Round 5	St. George Illawarra Dragons	Suncorp Stadium	28 – 20	Norman, P. Wallace, McCullough, Glenn, Gillett	P. Wallace (4/6)	38,012
Friday, 6 April	Round 6	Wests Tigers	Allianz Stadium	18 – 14	Reed (2), Copley	Parker (2/2), P. Wallace (1/2)	17,556
Friday, 13 April	Round 7	Canberra Raiders	Suncorp Stadium	30 – 6	Norman (2), Thaiday, Hannant, Gillett, Hunt	Parker (3/6)	30,017
Friday, 27 April	Round 8	Gold Coast Titans	Suncorp Stadium	26 – 6	Glenn (2), McCullough, Beale, Hoffman	Parker (3/5)	30,083
Saturday, 5 May	Round 9	New Zealand Warriors	Mt Smart Stadium	20 – 30	Reed, Glenn, Te'o, Thaiday	Parker (2/4)	19,012
Friday, 11 May	Round 10	Manly-Warringah Sea Eagles	Suncorp Stadium	22 – 24	Gillett (2), Reed, Beale, Glenn	Parker (0/4), Norman (1/1)	41,273
	Round 11	Bye					
Friday, 25 May	Round 12	Melbourne Storm	AAMI Park	10 – 34	Reed, Te'o	Parker (1/2)	13,200
Sunday, 3 June	Round 13	Newcastle Knights	Suncorp Stadium	50 – 24	Hodges (2), Beale, Reed, Copley, Thaiday, McCullough, Hoffman	Parker (8/8), P. Wallace (1/1)	26,683
Sunday, 10 June	Round 14	Sydney Roosters	Allianz Stadium	40 – 22	Te'o, Beale, P. Wallace, Glenn, Norman, Maranta, Reed	P. Wallace (6/7)	9,738
Friday, 15 June	Round 15	North Queensland Cowboys	Dairy Farmers Stadium	0 – 12			20,367
Friday, 22 June	Round 16	South Sydney Rabbitohs	Suncorp Stadium	26 – 12	Hodges, Glenn, Copley, Norman, Te'o	Parker (3/4), Civoniceva (0/1)	33,602
Friday, 29 June	Round 17	Cronulla-Sutherland Sharks	Suncorp Stadium	12 – 26	Whitchurch, Glenn	P. Wallace (2/2)	26,268
	Round 18	Bye					
Friday, 13 July	Round 19	New Zealand Warriors	Suncorp Stadium	10 – 8	Norman	Parker (3/3)	32,148
Friday, 20 July	Round 20	Gold Coast Titans	Skilled Park	10 – 14	Norman, Te'o	Parker (1/1), P. Wallace (0/1)	20,067
Monday, 30 July	Round 21	Parramatta Eels	Suncorp Stadium	22 – 42	Norman, Capewell, McCullough, Maranta	P. Wallace (3/3), Norman (0/1)	22,626
Sunday, 5 August	Round 22	Canberra Raiders	Canberra Stadium	12 – 28	Glenn (2)	P. Wallace (2/2)	9,850
Sunday, 12 August	Round 23	Canterbury-Bankstown Bulldogs	ANZ Stadium	14 – 22	Te'o, Norman	P. Wallace (3/3)	19,870
Friday, 17 August	Round 24	Melbourne Storm	Suncorp Stadium	18 – 19	Te'o (2), Hodges	P. Wallace (3/3)	41,467
Friday, 24 August	Round 25	Manly-Warringah Sea Eagles	Brookvale Oval	6 – 16	Glenn	P. Wallace (1/1)	12,886
Friday, 31 August	Round 26	Penrith Panthers	Suncorp Stadium	19 – 12	P. Wallace, Te'o, Glenn	P. Wallace (2/2) & (FG), Norman (1/1)	35,178
Legend: Win Loss Draw Bye

=== Ladder ===
2012 NRL season
Pos	Team	Pld	W	D	L	B	PF	PA	PD	Pts
1	Canterbury-Bankstown Bulldogs	24	18	0	6	2	568	369	+199	40
2	Melbourne Storm (P)	24	17	0	7	2	579	361	+218	38
3	South Sydney Rabbitohs	24	16	0	8	2	559	438	+121	36
4	Manly Warringah Sea Eagles	24	16	0	8	2	497	403	+94	36
5	North Queensland Cowboys	24	15	0	9	2	597	445	+152	34
6	Canberra Raiders	24	13	0	11	2	545	536	+9	30
7	Cronulla-Sutherland Sharks	24	12	1	11	2	445	441	+4	29
8	Brisbane Broncos	24	12	0	12	2	481	447	+34	28
9	St. George Illawarra Dragons	24	11	0	13	2	405	438	-33	26
10	Wests Tigers	24	11	0	13	2	506	551	-45	26
11	Gold Coast Titans	24	10	0	14	2	449	477	-28	24
12	Newcastle Knights	24	10	0	14	2	448	488	-40	24
13	Sydney Roosters	24	8	1	15	2	462	626	-164	21
14	New Zealand Warriors	24	8	0	16	2	497	609	-112	20
15	Penrith Panthers	24	8	0	16	2	409	575	-166	20
16	Parramatta Eels	24	6	0	18	2	431	674	-243	16

=== Finals ===
Qualifying and elimination finals
7 Sep, ANZ Stadium
1	Canterbury-Bankstown	16
4	Manly-Warringah	10
8 Sep, Dairy Farmers Stadium
5	North Queensland	33
8	Brisbane	16
9 Sep, Canberra Stadium
6	Canberra	34
7	Cronulla-Sutherland	16
8 Sep, AAMI Park
2	Melbourne	24
3	South Sydney	6

Semi-finals
14 Sep, Allianz Stadium
Manly-Warringah	22
North Queensland	12
15 Sep, ANZ Stadium
South Sydney	38
Canberra	16

Preliminary finals
22 Sep, ANZ Stadium
Canterbury-Bankstown	32
South Sydney	8
21 Sep, AAMI Park
Melbourne	40
Manly-Warringah	12

Grand final
30 Sep, ANZ Stadium
Canterbury-Bankstown	4
Melbourne	14

Date	Round	Opponent	Venue	Score	Tries	Goals	Attendance
Saturday, 8 September	Elimination Final	North Queensland Cowboys	Dairy Farmers Stadium	16 – 33	Norman, Thaiday, Copley	P. Wallace (2/3)	21,307
Legend: Win Loss

== Statistics ==
Name	App	T	G	FG	Pts
Scott Anderson	4	0	0	0	0
Kurt Baptiste	1	0	0	0	0
Gerard Beale	25	8	0	0	32
Luke Capewell	5	1	0	0	4
Petero Civoniceva	20	0	0	0	0
Dale Copley	15	4	0	0	16
Mitchell Dodds	10	0	0	0	0
Brendon Gibb	3	0	0	0	0
Matt Gillett	23	6	0	0	24
Alex Glenn	23	13	0	0	52
David Hala	1	0	0	0	0
Ben Hannant	22	2	0	0	8
Justin Hodges	18	5	0	0	20
Josh Hoffman	23	3	0	0	12
Ben Hunt	25	1	0	0	4
Dunamis Lui	9	0	0	0	0
Lachlan Maranta	7	2	0	0	8
Andrew McCullough	25	4	0	0	16
Josh McGuire	24	1	0	0	4
Corey Norman	25	10	2	0	44
Corey Parker	17	0	34	0	68
Jack Reed	22	7	0	0	28
Nick Slyney	3	0	0	0	0
Ben Te'o	21	10	0	0	40
Sam Thaiday	21	4	0	0	16
Jarrod Wallace	2	0	0	0	0
Peter Wallace	23	4	36	1	89
Aaron Whitchurch	2	1	0	0	4
Jharal Yow Yeh	4	2	0	0	8
Totals	-	88	72	1	497

== Representatives ==
The following players appeared in a representative match in 2012.

Australian Kangaroos

- Ben Hannant
- Justin Hodges
- Sam Thaiday

Indigenous All Stars

- Justin Hodges
- Sam Thaiday
- Jharal Yow Yeh

New Zealand Kiwis

- Alex Glenn
- Josh Hoffman
- Gerard Beale

NRL All Stars

- Jack Reed

Prime Minister's XIII

- Josh McGuire
- Ben Te'o

Queensland Maroons

- Matt Gillett
- Ben Hannant
- Justin Hodges
- Corey Parker
- Sam Thaiday
- Ben Te'o

== Awards ==
=== League ===
- Nil

=== Club ===
- Paul Morgan Medal: Andrew McCullough
- Players’ Player: Andrew McCullough
- Rookie of the Year: Lachlan Maranta
- Best Back: Justin Hodges
- Best Forward: Alex Glenn
- Most Consistent: Josh McGuire
- Play of the Year: Josh Hoffman
- Defence Play of the Year: Matt Gillett
- Fan Player of the Year: Corey Parker
- Clubman of the Year: Jess West & Terry Gray
- NYC Player of the Year: Francis Molo
- NYC Players’ Player: Brandon Lee
- NYC Best Back: Corey Oates
- NYC Best Forward: Caleb Timu
