= 2012 St. George Illawarra Dragons season =

- 2012 record: Wins: 11; losses: 13
- Points scored: For: 405; against: 438

Team information
- Coach: (Australia) Steve Price
- Captain: (Australia) Ben Hornby
- Stadium: WIN Jubilee Oval WIN Stadium

Top scorers
- Tries: Brett Morris (14)
- Goals: Jamie Soward (43)
- Points: Jamie Soward (97)
← 2011	2013 →

The 2012 St. George Illawarra Dragons season will be the 14th in the joint venture club's history.

== Regular season ==
Round	1	2	3	4	5	6	7	8	9	10	11	12	13	14	15	16	17	18	19	20	21	22	23	24	25	26	27
Ground	A	A	H	H	A	A	H	H	A	A	H	H	A	-	H	H	A	-	H	A	H	A	A	H	H	A	
Result	W	L	W	W	L	L	W	W	L	L	L	W	L	B	L	W	L	B	W	L	W	L	L	L	W	W	
Position	1	8	4	8	4	6	5	4	5	10	11	10	10	9	10	10	11	10	12	11	9	11	12	12	12	9	
Points	2	2	4	6	6	6	8	10	10	10	10	12	12	14	14	16	16	18	20	20	22	22	22	22	24	26	

A = Away; H = Home; N = Neutral; B = Bye; W = Win; D = Draw; L = Loss

== Ladder ==
2012 NRL season
Pos	Team	Pld	W	D	L	B	PF	PA	PD	Pts
1	Canterbury-Bankstown Bulldogs	24	18	0	6	2	568	369	+199	40
2	Melbourne Storm (P)	24	17	0	7	2	579	361	+218	38
3	South Sydney Rabbitohs	24	16	0	8	2	559	438	+121	36
4	Manly Warringah Sea Eagles	24	16	0	8	2	497	403	+94	36
5	North Queensland Cowboys	24	15	0	9	2	597	445	+152	34
6	Canberra Raiders	24	13	0	11	2	545	536	+9	30
7	Cronulla-Sutherland Sharks	24	12	1	11	2	445	441	+4	29
8	Brisbane Broncos	24	12	0	12	2	481	447	+34	28
9	St. George Illawarra Dragons	24	11	0	13	2	405	438	-33	26
10	Wests Tigers	24	11	0	13	2	506	551	-45	26
11	Gold Coast Titans	24	10	0	14	2	449	477	-28	24
12	Newcastle Knights	24	10	0	14	2	448	488	-40	24
13	Sydney Roosters	24	8	1	15	2	462	626	-164	21
14	New Zealand Warriors	24	8	0	16	2	497	609	-112	20
15	Penrith Panthers	24	8	0	16	2	409	575	-166	20
16	Parramatta Eels	24	6	0	18	2	431	674	-243	16

== Squad ==
St. George Illawarra Dragons
Current NRL premiership squad			Coaching staff
Leeson Ah Mau – PR, SR; Matt Cooper – CE; Ben Creagh – SR; Evander Cummins – FB; Jack De Belin – PR, SR; Nick Emmett – CE, SR; Nathan Fien – HK; Bronx Goodwin – FB; David Gower – PR, SR; Nathan Green – CE; Ben Hornby (c) – HB, FB; Dan Hunt – PR; Denan Kemp – FB, WG	Nathan Jones – SR, LK; Cameron King – HK; Jeremy Latimore – PR, SR; Jake Marketo – SR, LK; Will Matthews – SR; Trent Merrin – PR; Josh Miller – PR, SR; Brett Morris – FB, WG; Jason Nightingale – FB, WG; Matt Prior – PR, SR; Mitch Rein – HK; Beau Scott – CE, SR; Jamie Soward (gk) – FE	Chase Stanley – CE; Kyle Stanley – FB, FE; Jack Stockwell – PR; Atelea Vea – SR; Daniel Vidot – CE, WG; Michael Weyman – CE; Dean Young (vc) – HK, LK	Head coach: Steve Price; Assistant coaches: Steve Folkes - Assistant Coach; Paul McGregor - NSW Cup Head Coach; Andrew Gray - Performance Director; Scott Campbell - Strength & Conditioning Coach; Dan Lawson - Physiotherapist; Matt Shirvington - Sprint Coach; Melanie MacDonald - Sports Science/Dietitian & Nutritionist; Rob Leslie - Athletic Development Coach; Robert Finch - Operations Manager; Joe Grima - Video Analyst; Legend: (c) Captain(s); (vc) Vice-captain(s); (gk) Goal kicker; Injured; Updated: 29 May 2011; Source(s): Player profiles, Rugby League Project

== Transfers ==
New Signings

- Chase Stanley from Melbourne Storm
- Daniel Vidot from Canberra Raiders
- Josh Miller from Canberra Raiders
- Leeson Ah Mau from North Queensland Cowboys
- Atelea Vea from Melbourne Storm
- Jeremy Latimore from New Zealand Warriors
- Will Matthews from Gold Coast Titans
- Denan Kemp from Southern Districts Rugby Club

Transfers/leaving

- Darius Boyd to Newcastle Knights
- Jon Green to Cronulla Sharks
- Michael Greenfield to Melbourne Storm
- Adam Cuthbertson to Newcastle Knights
- Peni Tagive to Sydney Roosters
- Daniel Penese to Parramatta Eels
- Jack Bosden to Sydney Roosters
- Mark Gasnier Retired
- Reece Simmonds Retired
- Peter Cronin released
