= 2012 Gold Coast Titans season =

Coordinates: 28°4′1″S 153°22′44″E

- NRL Rank: 11th
- 2012 record: Wins: 10; draws: 0; losses: 14
- Points scored: For: 449; against: 477

Team information
- CEO: David May
- Coach: John Cartwright
- Captain: Scott Prince
- Stadium: Skilled Park
- Avg. attendance: 14,358
- High attendance: 20,187

Top scorers
- Tries: David Mead (10)
- Goals: Scott Prince (59)
- Points: Scott Prince (134)
← 2011	List of seasons	2013 →

The 2012 Gold Coast Titans season was the 6th in the club's history. Coached by John Cartwright and captained by Scott Prince they competed in the National Rugby League's 2012 Telstra Premiership. They finished the regular season 11th (out of 16), failing to make the finals for the second consecutive year. Nate Myles was named the club's player of the year.

== Season summary ==
After their worst ever season which ended in their winning the wooden spoon in 2011, the Titans underwent significant player turnover, which included the signings of Nate Myles, Phil Graham and Jamal Idris amongst others.

On 26 July, The Titans announced changes to its management team including the appointment of a new CEO and new investors. David May, the former CMO of iSelect was named the new CEO of the Titans replacing Michael Searle who stood down as managing director to become executive director of football.

At the end of the season the Paul Broughton Medal for player of the year went to second-rower Nate Myles.

=== Milestones ===
- Round 1: Luke Douglas, Jamal Idris and Nate Myles made their debuts for the club.
- Round 2: Jordan Rankin scored his 1st career try.
- Round 3: Mark Minichiello played his 200th career game and Matthew White played his 100th career game.
- Round 3: Beau Champion made his debut for the club.
- Round 4: Luke Douglas played his 150th career game.
- Round 5: Luke Bailey played his 100th career game for the club and Luke O'Dwyer played his 100th career game.
- Round 5: Brenton Lawrence scored his 1st career try.
- Round 7: David Mead scored his 33rd career try which moved him into first on the all-time try scoring list for the Gold Coast Titans surpassing Anthony Laffranchi and Mat Rogers.
- Round 7: Aidan Sezer made his debut for the club and his debut in the NRL.
- Round 7: Aidan Sezer scored his 1st career try.
- Round 7: William Zillman played his 100th career game.
- Round 9: Phil Graham made his debut for the club, after previously playing for the Canberra Raiders and Sydney Roosters.
- Round 10: Greg Bird played his 50th game for the club.
- Round 14: Jamie Dowling made his debut for the club.
- Round 16: Steve Michaels played his 100th career game.
- Round 19: Beau Falloon made his debut for the club, after previously playing for the South Sydney Rabbitohs.
- Round 23: Ben Ridge scored his 1st career try.
- Round 25: Nate Myles played his 150th career game.

== Squad List ==
Gold Coast Titans
First team squad			Coaching staff
Luke Bailey – PR; Greg Bird – FE, LK; Beau Champion – CE; Anthony Don – FB, WG; Luke Douglas – PR; Jamie Dowling – FB, WG; Beau Falloon – HK; Louis Fanene – PR, SR; Kevin Gordon – WG, CE; Phil Graham – WG, CE; Ashley Harrison – SR, LK; Michael Henderson – PR	Beau Henry – FE, HB; Jamal Idris – CE; Ryan James – SR; Brenton Lawrence – PR; Kayne Lawton – HK, HB; David Mead – WG; Steve Michaels – WG, CE; Mark Minichiello – SR; Nate Myles – PR, SR; Cody Nelson – FE, LK; Luke O'Dwyer – CE, SR; Luke Page – PR, SR	Dominique Peyroux – WG, CE; Scott Prince (c) – HB; Jordan Rankin – FE, HB; Ben Ridge – SR; Aidan Sezer – FE; Matt Srama – HK; Bodene Thompson – PR, SR; Joe Vickery – WG; Javarn White – FB; Matt White – PR; William Zillman – FB, FE	Head coach: John Cartwright; Assistant coaches: Trevor Gillmeister; Steve Murphy; Chris McLellan (strength & conditioning coach); Dan Ferris (strength & conditioning assistant); Greg Condon (Physiotherapist); Legend: (c) Captain(s); (vc) Vice-captain(s); Updated: 1 December 2011; Source(s): Titans Squad, Coaches & Trainers

== Squad Movement ==
=== Gains ===
Players	Signed From	Until End of	Notes
Beau Champion	Melbourne Storm	2014	
Luke Douglas	Cronulla-Sutherland Sharks	2014	
Beau Falloon	South Sydney Rabbitohs	2013	
Phil Graham	Sydney Roosters	2012	
Jamal Idris	Canterbury-Bankstown Bulldogs	2016	
Nate Myles	Sydney Roosters	2015	
Aidan Sezer	Canterbury-Bankstown Bulldogs	2013	

=== Losses ===
Players	Signed To	Until End of	Notes
Riley Brown	Released	-	
Preston Campbell	Retirement	-	
Luke Capewell	Brisbane Broncos	2012	
Nathan Friend	New Zealand Warriors	2013	
Anthony Laffranchi	St. Helens	2013	
Will Matthews	St George Illawarra Dragons	2013	
Brad Meyers	Retirement	-	
Mat Rogers	Retirement	-	
Esikeli Tonga	Parramatta Eels	2013	
Clinton Toopi	Retirement	-	

=== Re-signings ===
Players	Club	Until End of	Notes
Steve Michaels	Gold Coast Titans	2015	
Mark Minichiello	Gold Coast Titans	2014	
Jordan Rankin	Gold Coast Titans	2014	
Ben Ridge	Gold Coast Titans	2015	
Matthew White	Gold Coast Titans	2015	
William Zillman	Gold Coast Titans	2017	

== Ladder ==
2012 NRL season
Pos	Team	Pld	W	D	L	B	PF	PA	PD	Pts
1	Canterbury-Bankstown Bulldogs	24	18	0	6	2	568	369	+199	40
2	Melbourne Storm (P)	24	17	0	7	2	579	361	+218	38
3	South Sydney Rabbitohs	24	16	0	8	2	559	438	+121	36
4	Manly Warringah Sea Eagles	24	16	0	8	2	497	403	+94	36
5	North Queensland Cowboys	24	15	0	9	2	597	445	+152	34
6	Canberra Raiders	24	13	0	11	2	545	536	+9	30
7	Cronulla-Sutherland Sharks	24	12	1	11	2	445	441	+4	29
8	Brisbane Broncos	24	12	0	12	2	481	447	+34	28
9	St. George Illawarra Dragons	24	11	0	13	2	405	438	-33	26
10	Wests Tigers	24	11	0	13	2	506	551	-45	26
11	Gold Coast Titans	24	10	0	14	2	449	477	-28	24
12	Newcastle Knights	24	10	0	14	2	448	488	-40	24
13	Sydney Roosters	24	8	1	15	2	462	626	-164	21
14	New Zealand Warriors	24	8	0	16	2	497	609	-112	20
15	Penrith Panthers	24	8	0	16	2	409	575	-166	20
16	Parramatta Eels	24	6	0	18	2	431	674	-243	16

== Fixtures ==
=== Pre-season ===
Date	Round	Opponent	Venue	Score	Tries	Goals	Attendance
Saturday, 4 February	Trial 1	New Zealand Warriors	North Harbour Stadium	10 – 26	Vickery, Dowling	Rankin (1)	10,500
Saturday, 11 February	Trial 2	Brisbane Broncos	Pizzey Park	18 – 16	Minichiello (2), Rankin	Prince (3)	7,252
Saturday, 18 February	Trial 3	North Queensland Cowboys	Virgin Australia Stadium	36 – 28	Zillman (2), Rankin, Lawrence, Ridge, Henry	Prince (5), Henry (1)	8,000
Legend: Win Loss Draw

=== Regular season ===
Date	Round	Opponent	Venue	Score	Tries	Goals	Attendance
Saturday, 3 March	Round 1	North Queensland Cowboys	Dairy Farmers Stadium	18 – 0	Idris (2), Michaels	Prince (3/5)	16,311
Saturday, 10 March	Round 2	Canberra Raiders	Skilled Park	12 – 24	Rankin, Peyroux	Prince (2/2)	11,378
Saturday, 17 March	Round 3	Melbourne Storm	Skilled Park	6 – 30	Michaels	Prince (1/1)	11,254
Saturday, 24 March	Round 4	New Zealand Warriors	Mt Smart Stadium	6 – 26	O'Dwyer	Prince (1/1)	12,915
Sunday, 1 April	Round 5	Canterbury-Bankstown Bulldogs	Skilled Park	20 – 30	Bird, Lawrence, Gordon, Myles	Prince (2/4)	14,344
Saturday, 7 April	Round 6	Sydney Roosters	Skilled Park	12 – 18	Mead (2)	Prince (2/2)	11,478
Saturday, 14 April	Round 7	Manly-Warringah Sea Eagles	Brookvale Oval	26 – 14	Sezer, Idris, Mead, Gordon	Prince (5/6)	11,619
Friday, 27 April	Round 8	Brisbane Broncos	Suncorp Stadium	6 – 26	Peyroux	Prince (1/1)	30,083
Saturday, 5 May	Round 9	Wests Tigers	Skilled Park	14 – 15	Gordon, Mead	Sezer (3/3)	14,254
Friday, 11 May	Round 10	Canterbury-Bankstown Bulldogs	Suncorp Stadium	25 – 14	Prince, Srama, Idris, Minichiello	Sezer (2/3) & (FG), Prince (2/3)	41,273
	Round 11	Bye					
Saturday, 26 May	Round 12	Newcastle Knights	Hunter Stadium	24 – 14	Srama, Mead, Myles, Bird	Prince (4/5)	15,792
Friday, 1 June	Round 13	North Queensland Cowboys	Skilled Park	28 – 12	Champion (2), Gordon, Bird, Harrison	Prince (4/5)	12,092
Sunday, 10 June	Round 14	Cronulla-Sutherland Sharks	Toyota Stadium	12 – 22	Srama, Champion	Sezer (2/2)	8,635
Sunday, 17 June	Round 15	Penrith Panthers	Skilled Park	36 – 18	Sezer (2), Mead, Michaels, Lawrence, O'Dwyer	Prince (6/6)	11,591
Friday, 22 June	Round 16	St. George Illawarra Dragons	WIN Stadium	6 – 8	Prince	Prince (1/1)	10,194
	Round 17	Bye					
Saturday, 7 July	Round 18	New Zealand Warriors	Skilled Park	14 – 32	Champion, Gordon, Mead	Prince (1/3)	17,134
Sunday, 15 July	Round 19	Canberra Raiders	Canberra Stadium	38 – 26	Zillman (2), Michaels (2), Gordon, Douglas, Falloon, O'Dwyer	Prince (3/8)	8,240
Friday, 20 July	Round 20	Brisbane Broncos	Skilled Park	14 – 10	Mead, Bailey	Prince (3/3)	20,067
Friday, 27 July	Round 21	Sydney Roosters	Allianz Stadium	36 – 16	Zillman (2), Prince, Idris, Falloon, Srama	Prince (6/7)	8,134
Sunday, 5 August	Round 22	South Sydney Rabbitohs	Skilled Park	18 – 22	Michaels, Sezer, Gordon	Prince (3/3)	20,187
Friday, 10 August	Round 23	Melbourne Storm	AAMI Park	16 – 24	Michaels, Ridge, Mead	Prince (2/3)	9,108
Sunday, 19 August	Round 24	Parramatta Eels	Skilled Park	24 – 16	Zillman, Myles, Michaels, Gordon	Prince (4/5)	14,159
Saturday, 25 August	Round 25	Penrith Panthers	Centrebet Stadium	22 – 36	Mead, Prince, Zillman, Minichiello	Prince (3/4)	7,297
Saturday, 1 September	Round 26	Manly-Warringah Sea Eagles	Skilled Park	16 – 24	Gordon (2), Falloon	Prince (2/3)	14,927
Legend: Win Loss Draw Bye

== Statistics ==
Name	App	T	G	FG	Pts
Luke Bailey	17	1	0	0	4
Greg Bird	17	3	0	0	12
Beau Champion	9	4	0	0	16
Luke Douglas	24	1	0	0	4
Jamie Dowling	1	0	0	0	0
Beau Falloon	8	3	0	0	12
Kevin Gordon	21	10	0	0	40
Phil Graham	2	0	0	0	0
Ashley Harrison	17	1	0	0	4
Michael Henderson	7	0	0	0	0
Jamal Idris	20	5	0	0	20
Ryan James	3	0	0	0	0
Brenton Lawrence	9	2	0	0	8
Kayne Lawton	4	0	0	0	0
David Mead	20	10	0	0	40
Steve Michaels	17	8	0	0	32
Mark Minichiello	23	2	0	0	8
Nate Myles	22	3	0	0	12
Luke O'Dwyer	21	3	0	0	12
Dominique Peyroux	12	2	0	0	8
Scott Prince	22	4	61	0	138
Jordan Rankin	6	1	0	0	4
Ben Ridge	17	1	0	0	4
Aidan Sezer	18	4	7	1	31
Matt Srama	23	4	0	0	16
Bodene Thompson	7	0	0	0	0
Matthew White	19	0	0	0	0
William Zillman	21	6	0	0	24
Totals	407	78	68	1	449

== Representative honours ==
The following players played a representative match in 2012.

Australian Kangaroos

- Greg Bird
- Nate Myles

Indigenous All Stars

- Greg Bird
- Jamal Idris
- Scott Prince

NSW Blues

- Greg Bird

NSW Country

- Greg Bird
- Luke Douglas

NRL All Stars

- Luke Bailey

Queensland Maroons

- Ashley Harrison
- Nate Myles
