= 2012 Sydney Roosters season =

- NRL Rank: 13th
- 2012 record: Wins: 8; draws: 1; losses: 15

Team information
- CEO: Steve Noyce
- Head Coach: Brian Smith
- Captain: Braith Anasta
- Stadium: Allianz Stadium, Sydney
- Avg. attendance: 12,707
- High attendance: 40,164 vs Dragons, 25 April, Sydney Football Stadium
- Low attendance: 10,008

Top scorers
- Tries: 10-Mitchell Pearce
- Goals: 62-Braith Anasta
- Points: 140-Braith Anasta
← 2011	List of seasons	2013 →

The 2012 Sydney Roosters season was the 105th in the club's history. Coached by Brian Smith and captained by Braith Anasta, they competed in the National Rugby League's 2012 Telstra Premiership. The Roosters finished the regular season 13th (out of 16), failing to reach the finals for the second consecutive year.

== Pre-season ==
=== Results ===
The Sydney Roosters will play 2 Trial games in 2012. The first game will be against the Canterbury-Bankstown Bulldogs and the second against the Wests Tigers. In the Roosters' first trial game of the year they went up against the Bulldogs at Belmore Sports Ground which was attended by around 12,000 fans, the game ended with the Roosters winning 28–16. In the second trial match they went up against the Wests Tigers at Campbelltown Stadium which was attended by 7,426 fans, The game ended with the roosters rallying from behind to win 28–24.

Date	Round	Opponent	Venue	Result	Attendance	Game Report
12 February	Trial 1	Canterbury-Bankstown Bulldogs	Belmore Sports Ground	16–28	12,000	Game Report
18 February	Trial 2	Wests Tigers	Campbelltown Stadium	24–28	7,426	Game Report
Legend: Win Loss Draw

== Regular season ==
=== Results ===
These are the results and fixtures of the Sydney Roosters 2012 Season. They started their 2012 season well against their longtime rivals the South Sydney Rabbitohs, with a comeback with the clock showing two and a half minutes.

Date	Round	Opponent	Venue	Result	Attendance	Game Report
5 March	Round 1	South Sydney Rabbitohs	ANZ Stadium	20–24		
11 March	Round 2	Penrith Panthers	Sydney Football Stadium	18-0		
18 March	Round 3	Canberra Raiders	Sydney Football Stadium	14-8		
25 March	Round 4	Melbourne Storm	AAMI Park	44-4		
31 March	Round 5	New Zealand Warriors	Sydney Football Stadium	26-8		
7 April	Round 6	Gold Coast Titans	Skilled Park	12–18		
14 April	Round 7	North Queensland Cowboys	TIO Stadium	12–50		
	Rep Weekend	BYE				
25 April	Round 8	St. George Illawarra Dragons	Sydney Football Stadium	28-24		
6 May	Round 9	Newcastle Knights	Sydney Football Stadium	24-6		
12 May	Round 10	New Zealand Warriors	Mount Smart Stadium	30-26		
20 May	Round 11	Manly-Warringah Sea Eagles	Brookvale Oval	18-10		
28 May	Round 12	Canterbury-Bankstown Bulldogs	Sydney Football Stadium	30-12		
	Round 13	BYE				
10 June	Round 14	Brisbane Broncos	Sydney Football Stadium	40-22		
17 June	Round 15	Wests Tigers	Leichhardt Oval	42-28		
24 June	Round 16	Manly-Warringah Sea Eagles	Sydney Football Stadium	52-14		
	Round 17	BYE				
9 July	Round 18	Cronulla-Sutherland Sharks	Toyota Stadium	14-14		
16 July	Round 19	South Sydney Rabbitohs	Sydney Cricket Ground	-		
22 July	Round 20	Penrith Panthers	Centrebet Stadium	28-16		
27 July	Round 21	Gold Coast Titans	Allianz Stadium	36-16		
3 August	Round 22	St. George Illawarra Dragons	Allianz Stadium	26-10		
11 August	Round 23	Parramatta Eels	Parramatta Stadium	36-22		
18 August	Round 24	Canberra Raiders	Canberra Stadium	20–24		
26 August	Round 25	Wests Tigers	Allianz Stadium	44-20		
1 September	Round 26	Canterbury-Bankstown Bulldogs	ANZ Stadium	10–42		
Legend: Win Loss Draw Bye

== Ladder ==
2012 NRL season
Pos	Team	Pld	W	D	L	B	PF	PA	PD	Pts
1	Canterbury-Bankstown Bulldogs	24	18	0	6	2	568	369	+199	40
2	Melbourne Storm (P)	24	17	0	7	2	579	361	+218	38
3	South Sydney Rabbitohs	24	16	0	8	2	559	438	+121	36
4	Manly Warringah Sea Eagles	24	16	0	8	2	497	403	+94	36
5	North Queensland Cowboys	24	15	0	9	2	597	445	+152	34
6	Canberra Raiders	24	13	0	11	2	545	536	+9	30
7	Cronulla-Sutherland Sharks	24	12	1	11	2	445	441	+4	29
8	Brisbane Broncos	24	12	0	12	2	481	447	+34	28
9	St. George Illawarra Dragons	24	11	0	13	2	405	438	-33	26
10	Wests Tigers	24	11	0	13	2	506	551	-45	26
11	Gold Coast Titans	24	10	0	14	2	449	477	-28	24
12	Newcastle Knights	24	10	0	14	2	448	488	-40	24
13	Sydney Roosters	24	8	1	15	2	462	626	-164	21
14	New Zealand Warriors	24	8	0	16	2	497	609	-112	20
15	Penrith Panthers	24	8	0	16	2	409	575	-166	20
16	Parramatta Eels	24	6	0	18	2	431	674	-243	16

== Squad ==
=== 2012 NRL Sydney Roosters Team ===
Sydney Roosters
2011 National Rugby League squad – 26 Players		Coaching staff
Josh Ailaomai – PR, SR; Braith Anasta (c) – FE, LK, SR; Tinirau Arona – PR, SR; Mitchell Aubusson – CE, SR; Jack Bosden – PR, SR; Justin Carney – CE, WG; Anthony Cherrington – SR; Boyd Cordner – SR, LK; Jake Friend – HK; Aiden Guerra – SR; Martin Kennedy – PR; Shaun Kenny-Dowall – WG, CE, FB, SR; Mark Khierallah – FB, HB	Joseph Leilua – WG, CE, SR; Mose Masoe – PR, SR; Anthony Minichiello – FB, WG; Anthony Mitchell – HK; Daniel Mortimer gk – FE; Frank-Paul Nuuausala – PR, SR, LK; Mitchell Pearce – HB; Sam Perrett – WG, CE, FB; Tom Symonds – LK, FE, CE, SR; Peni Tagive – WG; Brad Takairangi – SR, LK; Lama Tasi – PR; Jared Waerea-Hargreaves – SR, PR	Head coach: Brian Smith; Legend: (c) Captain(s); (vc) Vice-captain(s); (gk) Goal kicker; Updated: 22 October 2011; Source(s): Sydney Roosters Squad

== Player Summary ==
Sydney Roosters 2012	Appearance	Interchange	Tries	Goals	F/G	Points
Braith Anasta	22	–	4	62	–	140
Tinirau Arona	4	16	3	–	–	12
Mitchell Aubusson	22	2	3	–	–	12
Jack Bosden	1	3	1	–	–	4
Justin Carney	5	–	–	–	–	0
Boyd Cordner	15	7	4	–	–	16
Jake Friend	20	4	2	–	–	8
Aidan Guerra	18	1	5	–	–	20
Adam Henry	4	–	1	–	–	4
Martin Kennedy	17	7	1	–	–	4
Shaun Kenny-Dowall	17	–	8	–	–	32
Joseph Leilua	19	–	6	–	–	24
Mose Masoe	1	13	–	–	–	0
Anthony Minichiello	24	–	9	–	–	36
Anthony Mitchell	4	2	1	–	–	4
Tautau Moga	14	–	7	–	–	28
Daniel Mortimer	4	4	2	5	–	18
Frank-Paul Nuuausala	18	1	2	–	–	8
Mitchell Pearce	22	–	10	–	–	40
Sam Perrett	15	–	3	–	–	12
Nafe Seluini	–	7	–	–	–	0
Tom Symonds	1	1	1	–	–	4
Peni Tagive	5	–	–	–	–	0
Brad Takairangi	5	11	1	–	–	4
Lama Tasi	3	16	2	–	–	8
Roger Tuivasa-Sheck	6	–	–	–	–	0
Daniel Tupou	3	–	3	–	–	12
Jared Waerea-Hargreaves	23	–	3	–	–	4012
Total	312	96	82	67	0	462
