= 2012 Parramatta Eels season =

Australia Rugby League Parramatta Eels 2012 season

- NRL Rank: 16th
- Play-off result: DNQ
- World Club Challenge: DNQ
- 2012 record: Wins: 6; draws: 0; losses: 18
- Points scored: For: 431; against: 674

Team information
- CEO: Bob Bentley
- Coach: (New Zealand) Stephen Kearney (Round 1–20) (Australia) Brad Arthur (Interim, Round 21–26)
- Captain: (Australia) Nathan Hindmarsh
- Stadium: Parramatta Stadium (Capacity: 20,741); ANZ Stadium (Capacity: 83,500)
- Avg. attendance: 16,803 (Home); 17,021 (Home & Away)
- Agg. attendance: 201,633 (Home); 408,493 (Home & Away)
- High attendance: 45,863 (2 September vs St. George Illawarra Dragons, Round 26)

Top scorers
- Tries: (Australia) Ken Sio (13)
- Goals: (Australia) Luke Burt (53)
- Points: (Australia) Luke Burt (134)
← 2011	List of seasons	2013 →

The 2012 Parramatta Eels season is the 66th in the club's history. Coached by Stephen Kearney (who was replaced part-way through the season by assistant coach, Brad Arthur) and captained by Nathan Hindmarsh, they competed in the NRL's 2012 Telstra Premiership. Parramatta finished the regular season in last place for the first time since 1972, also failing to make the finals for the third consecutive year.

== Summary ==
2012 saw the retirement of Eels legends Luke Burt and Nathan Hindmarsh. It would also mark the first time since 1972 that the team would succumb to the dreaded Wooden Spoon. Parramatta struggled all year, securing just their first win of the season in Round 5 against defending premiers Manly-Warringah Sea Eagles before ending a six-game losing streak against the Cronulla-Sutherland Sharks. This horror start to the season, and a win rate of less than 25% over almost two seasons with the club, coach Stephen Kearney was forced to resign and assistant coach Brad Arthur would become caretaker. The team responded to this producing three wins from four games, including competition front-runners Melbourne Storm and Brisbane Broncos to give the fans some hope for the rest of the season. However this was short lived and following a 38-6 thumping to the South Sydney Rabbitohs in round 25 of the Telstra Premiership were officially unable to avoid the wooden spoon.

Whilst Parramatta's problems were largely attributed to their relatively poor defence, numerous pundits claimed Parramatta's problems in 2012 were largely credited to the recurring absences of star fullback Jarryd Hayne. Even whilst producing higher per-match statistics than any other fullback in the game (eight tries, 14 try-assists), Hayne only managed to complete ten games from the season's 24, due to both injury and State of Origin duty.

Throughout the season many of the Parramatta players came under scrutiny and were dropped to the NSW Cup, including high-profile recruit Chris Sandow, who at the time was touted as overweight and unfit, and veteran Luke Burt. As a result, players Matt Ryan, Jake Mullaney and Nathan Smith were called up to the top squad and have impressed in their roles of Second-Row, Fullback and Hooker respectively, making a suitable replacement for injured stars Jarryd Hayne and Matt Keating.

Towards the end of the season Ricky Stuart was announced as the new coach for the Parramatta Eels from 2013.

== Standings ==
=== National Rugby League ===
2012 NRL season
Pos	Team	Pld	W	D	L	B	PF	PA	PD	Pts
1	Canterbury-Bankstown Bulldogs	24	18	0	6	2	568	369	+199	40
2	Melbourne Storm (P)	24	17	0	7	2	579	361	+218	38
3	South Sydney Rabbitohs	24	16	0	8	2	559	438	+121	36
4	Manly Warringah Sea Eagles	24	16	0	8	2	497	403	+94	36
5	North Queensland Cowboys	24	15	0	9	2	597	445	+152	34
6	Canberra Raiders	24	13	0	11	2	545	536	+9	30
7	Cronulla-Sutherland Sharks	24	12	1	11	2	445	441	+4	29
8	Brisbane Broncos	24	12	0	12	2	481	447	+34	28
9	St. George Illawarra Dragons	24	11	0	13	2	405	438	-33	26
10	Wests Tigers	24	11	0	13	2	506	551	-45	26
11	Gold Coast Titans	24	10	0	14	2	449	477	-28	24
12	Newcastle Knights	24	10	0	14	2	448	488	-40	24
13	Sydney Roosters	24	8	1	15	2	462	626	-164	21
14	New Zealand Warriors	24	8	0	16	2	497	609	-112	20
15	Penrith Panthers	24	8	0	16	2	409	575	-166	20
16	Parramatta Eels	24	6	0	18	2	431	674	-243	16

=== National Youth Competition ===
2012 National Youth Competition season
Pos.	Team	Pld	W	D	L	B	PF	PA	PD	Pts
1	Canterbury Bulldogs	24	17	1	6	2	774	517	+257	39
2	New Zealand Warriors	24	17	1	6	2	680	516	+164	39
3	Canberra Raiders	24	16	0	8	2	766	599	+167	36
4	Wests Tigers (P)	24	15	0	9	2	666	514	+152	34
5	Penrith Panthers	24	14	1	9	2	694	501	+193	33
6	South Sydney Rabbitohs	24	14	1	9	2	734	592	+142	33
7	Sydney Roosters	24	13	2	9	2	694	570	+124	32
8	St. George Illawarra Dragons	24	13	1	10	2	638	553	+85	31
9	Melbourne Storm	24	12	2	10	2	547	556	−9	30
10	Cronulla Sharks	24	11	2	11	2	619	684	−65	28
11	Newcastle Knights	24	10	1	13	2	646	574	+72	25
12	Brisbane Broncos	24	9	0	15	2	629	790	−161	22
13	North Queensland Cowboys	24	7	2	15	2	545	732	−187	20
14	Manly Sea Eagles	24	6	2	16	2	519	811	−292	18
15	Parramatta Eels	24	5	0	19	2	558	814	−256	14
16	Gold Coast Titans	24	5	0	19	2	424	810	−386	14

== Fixtures ==
=== Pre-season ===
Date	Opponent	Venue	Result	Score	Tries	Goals	Attendance	Report
11 February	Wests Tigers	Bluetongue Stadium, Gosford	Loss	20–12	E. Tonga, Toutai	Burt 2		
17 February	Penrith Panthers	Centrebet Stadium, Penrith	Loss	26–12	Sio, Sandow	Burt 2	18,511	

=== Home and away season ===
Date	Round	Opponent	Venue	Result	Score	Tries	Goals	Attendance	Report
2 March	Round 1	Brisbane Broncos	Parramatta Stadium, Parramatta	Loss	6–18	Sandow	Burt 1/1	11,339	
12 March	Round 2	New Zealand Warriors	Parramatta Stadium, Parramatta	Loss	20–36	Sio, Blair, Sandow (2)	Sandow 2/4	12,102	
18 March	Round 3	North Queensland Cowboys	Dairy Farmers Stadium, Townsville	Loss	42–6	O'Hanlon	Sandow 1/1	8,239	
23 March	Round 4	Penrith Panthers	Parramatta Stadium, Parramatta	Loss	6–39	Maitua	Sandow 1/1	13,788	
31 March	Round 5	Manly-Warringah Sea Eagles	Parramatta Stadium, Parramatta	Win	29–20	Hayne (2), Keating, Sio	Sandow 6/6 & FG: 1/1	13,518	
8 April	Round 6	Newcastle Knights	Hunter Stadium, Newcastle	Loss	14–6	T. Mannah	Sandow 1/1	24,158	
15 April	Round 7	Cronulla-Sutherland Sharks	Toyota Stadium, Woolooware	Loss	24–18	Hayne (2), Blair	Sandow 3/3	14,327	
29 April	Round 8	Wests Tigers	Parramatta Stadium, Parramatta	Loss	30–31	Blair, Hayne, Ryan, Sio, W. Tonga	Burt 5/5	19,654	
4 May	Round 9	Canterbury-Bankstown Bulldogs	ANZ Stadium, Sydney Olympic Park	Loss	12–46	Morgan, Sio	Burt 2/2	28,214	
13 May	Round 10	Canberra Raiders	Canberra Stadium, Canberra	Loss	40–34	Morgan (2), Sio (2), Blair, Sandow	Burt 5/6	9,210	
18-21 May	Round 11	Bye							
26 May	Round 12	St. George Illawarra Dragons	WIN Jubilee Oval, Kogarah	Loss	14–12	McGuire, Ryan	Burt 2/2	12,756	
4 June	Round 13	Cronulla-Sutherland Sharks	Parramatta Stadium, Parramatta	Win	29–20	Burt (2), Hayne (2), Morgan	Burt 4/5; Sandow FG: 1/1	10,009	
8-11 June	Round 14	Bye							
16 June	Round 15	South Sydney Rabbitohs	ANZ Stadium, Sydney Olympic Park	Loss	6–24	Maitua	Burt 1/1	14,212	
23 June	Round 16	Penrith Panthers	Centrebet Stadium, Penrith	Win	19–18	Burt, Hayne, Morgan	Burt 3/3; Sandow FG: 1/1	15,275	
30 June	Round 17	Newcastle Knights	Parramatta Stadium, Parramatta	Loss	12–20	M. Keating, Sio	Burt 2/2	12,022	
8 July	Round 18	Manly-Warringah Sea Eagles	Brookvale Oval, Brookvale	Loss	40–24	Sio (2), Burt, Mullaney	Burt 4/4	16,065	
13 July	Round 19	Canterbury-Bankstown Bulldogs	ANZ Stadium, Sydney Olympic Park	Loss	12–32	Morgan, Sio	Burt 2/2	31,102	
21 July	Round 20	Melbourne Storm	Parramatta Stadium, Parramatta	Win	16–10	Hindmarsh, Sio, B. Smith	Burt 2/3	9,029	
30 July	Round 21	Brisbane Broncos	Suncorp Stadium, Brisbane	Win	22–42	Sandow (2), Burt, Moimoi, Poore, Sio, N. Smith	Burt 7/7	22,626	
6 August	Round 22	Wests Tigers	Campbelltown Sports Stadium, Campbelltown	Loss	51–26	Mullaney (2), Roberts, Sio, Tautai	Burt 3/5	14,822	
11 August	Round 23	Sydney Roosters	Parramatta Stadium, Parramatta	Win	36–22	Morgan (2), Sandow (2), Blair, Hindmarsh	Burt 6/7	12,193	
19 August	Round 24	Gold Coast Titans	Skilled Park, Gold Coast	Loss	24–16	Burt, Lasalo, Sandow	Burt 2/3	14,159	
26 August	Round 25	South Sydney Rabbitohs	ANZ Stadium, Sydney Olympic Park	Loss	6–38	Burt	Burt 1/1	24,121	
2 September	Round 26	St. George Illawarra Dragons	ANZ Stadium, Sydney Olympic Park	Loss	8–29	Morgan	Burt 1/1, Hindmarsh 1/1	45,863	

== Players and staff ==
Parramatta Eels
NRL Premiership Squad			Coaching staff
Mitchell Allgood – PR, SR; Jordan Atkins – WG, WG; Marmin Barba – FB, FE; Cheyse Blair – CE, WG; Rory Brien – LK, CE; Luke Burt – FB, WG; Jarryd Hayne – FB, FE, CE, WG; Nathan Hindmarsh (c) – SR; Justin Horo – SR; Matt Keating – HK; Luke Kelly – FE, HB; Taniela Lasalo – SR; Jacob Loko – CE, SR	Reni Maitua – SR, PR; Jon Mannah – PR; Tim Mannah – PR; Casey McGuire – HK; Fuifui Moimoi – PR; Ryan Morgan – CE; Jake Mullaney – FB; Pat O'Hanlon – SR; Joseph Paulo – LK; Daniel Penese – SR; Justin Poore – PR; Ben Roberts – FE, WG; Matt Ryan – SR	Chris Sandow – HB, FE; Troy Savage – CE; Shane Shackleton – SR, PR; Ken Sio – WG; Ben Smith – SR, CE; Nathan Smith – HK; Taulima Tautai – LK; Peni Terepo – LK; Esi Tonga – HB; Willie Tonga – CE, WG	Head coach: Stephen Kearney; Assistant coach: Matthew Cameron (also Toyota Cup head coach); Legend: (c) Captain(s); (vc) Vice-captain(s); Injured; Updated: 27 March 2012; Source(s): Player profiles, Coaching staff, Injury update, Rugby League Project

== Transfers ==
In:

Nat.	Pos.	Name	From
(Samoa)	SO	Ben Roberts	Canterbury Bankstown Bulldogs
(Australia)	HK	Nathan Smith	Canterbury Bankstown Bulldogs
(New Zealand)	PR	Taulima Tautai	Cronulla Sutherland Sharks
(Australia)	PR	Jon Mannah	Cronulla Sutherland Sharks
(Tonga)	CE	Esikeli Tonga	Gold Coast Titans
(Australia)	CE	Willie Tonga	North Queensland Cowboys
(United States)	LF	Joseph Paulo	Penrith Panthers
(New Zealand)	SR	Daniel Penese	St George Illawarra Dragons
(Australia)	SH	Chris Sandow	South Sydney Rabbitohs
(Australia)	WG	Cheyse Blair	Sydney Roosters
(Australia)	FB	Jake Mullaney	Wests Tigers

Out

Nat.	Pos.	Name	To
(Tonga)	PR	Manase Manuokafoa	Bradford Bulls
(Australia)	SH	Jeff Robson	Cronulla Sutherland Sharks
(Australia)	SO	Daniel Mortimer	Sydney Roosters
(Australia)	WG	Daniel Tupou	Sydney Roosters
(Tonga)	WG	Etu Uaisele	Penrith Panthers
(Australia)	CE	Joel Reddy	Wests Tigers
(Australia)	FB	Tom Humble	Wests Tigers
(New Zealand)	PR	Pele Peletelese	Burleigh Bears

Retirees

- Chris Hicks
- Chris Walker
- Paul Whatuira
- Carl Webb

Note: Former Manly player and NSW representative, William Hopoate will join the Eels in 2014 after completing a two-year religious mission for the Church of Jesus Christ of Latter-day Saints.

== Player statistics ==
Player statistics as of 26 August 2012.

Name	App	T	G	FG	Pts
Mitchell Allgood	17	0	0	0	0
Cheyse Blair	20	5	0	0	20
Luke Burt	18	6	51	0	126
Jarryd Hayne	12	8	0	0	32
Nathan Hindmarsh	21	2	0	0	8
Justin Horo	4	0	0	0	0
Matthew Keating	15	2	0	0	8
Luke Kelly	4	0	0	0	0
Taniela Lasalo	10	1	0	0	4
Casey McGuire	11	1	0	0	0
Reni Maitua	19	2	0	0	8
Tim Mannah	22	1	0	0	4
Fuifui Moimoi	21	1	0	0	4
Ryan Morgan	17	8	0	0	32
Jake Mullaney	5	3	0	0	12
Pat O'Hanlon	2	1	0	0	4
Joseph Paulo	21	0	0	0	0
Justin Poore	21	1	0	0	4
Ben Roberts	17	1	0	0	4
Matt Ryan	17	2	0	0	8
Chris Sandow	21	9	14	3	67
Ken Sio	22	13	0	0	52
Ben Smith	8	1	0	0	4
Nathan Smith	7	1	0	0	4
Taulima Tautai	9	1	0	0	4
Esikeli Tonga	3	0	0	0	0
Willie Tonga	12	1	0	0	4

== Milestones ==
- Round 4 – Four losses marked the Eels' worst season opening since 1991
- Round 5 – The Eels broke their losing streak in to 2011 Premiers, the Manly-Warringah Sea Eagles

Part-way through the season it was announced that head coach Stephen Kearney would depart the club, with his assistant Brad Arthur taking over for the remainder of 2012. About a week later Ricky Stuart was announced as the Eels' head coach for the 2013 NRL season.

== Jersey and Sponsors ==
Parramatta retain Pirtek Fluid Systems as major sponsor in 2012. The team is often referred to as the Pirtek Eels. Apparel sponsors for 2012 are Law Partners Compensation Lawyers, the University of New England, and Capital Corporation.
