= 2012 Cronulla-Sutherland Sharks season =

- NRL rank: 7th

Team information
- CEO: Richard Fisk
- Coach: Shane Flanagan
- Assistant coach: Peter Sharp
- Captain: Paul Gallen
- Stadium: Toyota Stadium
- Avg. attendance: 13,237

Top scorers
- Tries: Ben Pomeroy (9)
- Goals: Todd Carney (54)
- Points: Todd Carney (127)
← 2011	2013 →

The 2012 Cronulla-Sutherland Sharks season is the 46th in the club's history. Coached by Shane Flanagan and captained by Paul Gallen, they competed in the NRL's 2012 Telstra Premiership, finishing the regular season 7th (out of 16).

The Sharks were knocked out of contention in their first game of the finals against the Canberra Raiders.

== Ladder ==
2012 NRL season
Pos	Team	Pld	W	D	L	B	PF	PA	PD	Pts
1	Canterbury-Bankstown Bulldogs	24	18	0	6	2	568	369	+199	40
2	Melbourne Storm (P)	24	17	0	7	2	579	361	+218	38
3	South Sydney Rabbitohs	24	16	0	8	2	559	438	+121	36
4	Manly Warringah Sea Eagles	24	16	0	8	2	497	403	+94	36
5	North Queensland Cowboys	24	15	0	9	2	597	445	+152	34
6	Canberra Raiders	24	13	0	11	2	545	536	+9	30
7	Cronulla-Sutherland Sharks	24	12	1	11	2	445	441	+4	29
8	Brisbane Broncos	24	12	0	12	2	481	447	+34	28
9	St. George Illawarra Dragons	24	11	0	13	2	405	438	-33	26
10	Wests Tigers	24	11	0	13	2	506	551	-45	26
11	Gold Coast Titans	24	10	0	14	2	449	477	-28	24
12	Newcastle Knights	24	10	0	14	2	448	488	-40	24
13	Sydney Roosters	24	8	1	15	2	462	626	-164	21
14	New Zealand Warriors	24	8	0	16	2	497	609	-112	20
15	Penrith Panthers	24	8	0	16	2	409	575	-166	20
16	Parramatta Eels	24	6	0	18	2	431	674	-243	16

=== Ladder progression ===
- Numbers highlighted in green indicate that the team finished the round inside the top 8.
- Numbers highlighted in blue indicates the team finished first on the ladder in that round.
- Numbers highlighted in red indicates the team finished last place on the ladder in that round.
- Underlined numbers indicate that the team had a bye during that round.

	Team	1	2	3	4	5	6	7	8	9	10	11	12	13	14	15	16	17	18	19	20	21	22	23	24	25	26
1	Canterbury-Bankstown	2	4	6	6	8	8	8	8	10	10	12	14	16	18	20	22	24	26	28	30	32	34	36	38	38	40
2	Melbourne	2	4	6	8	10	12	14	16	18	18	20	22	24	24	26	26	28	28	28	28	28	30	32	34	36	38
3	South Sydney	0	0	2	2	4	6	6	8	10	12	14	16	16	18	20	20	22	24	26	28	30	32	32	32	34	36
4	Manly-Warringah	2	4	4	4	4	6	6	8	10	12	14	14	16	18	18	20	22	24	24	24	26	28	30	32	34	36
5	North Queensland	0	2	4	4	6	6	8	8	10	12	14	14	14	16	18	20	20	22	24	26	26	26	28	30	32	34
6	Canberra	0	2	2	4	4	6	6	6	6	8	10	10	10	12	14	14	16	18	18	20	20	22	24	26	28	30
7	Cronulla-Sutherland	0	0	2	4	6	8	10	12	12	14	14	16	16	18	20	22	24	25	25	25	25	27	27	29	29	29
8	Brisbane	2	2	4	6	8	10	12	14	14	14	16	16	18	20	20	22	22	24	26	26	26	26	26	26	26	28
9	St. George Illawarra	2	2	4	6	6	6	8	10	10	10	10	12	12	14	14	16	16	18	20	20	22	22	22	22	24	26
10	Wests	2	2	2	2	2	2	4	6	8	10	12	14	16	18	18	18	20	20	22	22	22	24	26	26	26	26
11	Gold Coast	2	2	2	2	2	2	4	4	4	6	8	10	12	12	14	14	16	16	18	20	22	22	22	24	24	24
12	Newcastle	0	2	2	4	4	6	6	8	8	8	10	10	10	10	12	14	16	16	18	20	22	22	24	24	24	24
13	Sydney	2	2	4	4	6	8	8	8	10	10	10	10	12	12	14	14	16	17	17	17	17	19	19	19	21	21
14	New Zealand	0	2	2	4	4	4	6	6	8	10	10	12	12	14	14	16	18	20	20	20	20	20	20	20	20	20
15	Penrith	0	2	2	4	4	4	4	4	4	6	6	8	10	10	10	10	10	12	12	14	16	16	16	18	20	20
16	Parramatta	0	0	0	0	2	2	2	2	2	2	4	4	6	8	8	10	10	10	10	12	14	14	16	16	16	16

== Results ==
- Round 1 – Tigers vs Sharks (Loss 17 - 16)

Tries – Isaac De Gois, Colin Best, Todd Carney

- Round 2 – Sharks vs Knights (Loss 6 - 18)

Tries – Ben Pomeroy

- Round 3 – Sharks vs Sea Eagles (Win 17 - 14)

Tries – Jayson Bukuya, Nathan Gardner, Ben Pomeroy

- Round 4 – Cowboys vs Sharks (Win 20 - 14)

Tries – Andrew Fifita, Ben Pomeroy, Paul Gallen

- Round 5 – Panthers vs Sharks (Win 14 - 15)

Tries – Jayson Bukuya, Wade Graham

- Round 6 – Sharks vs Dragons (Win 12 - 0)

Tries – John Morris, Wade Graham

- Round 7 – Sharks vs Eels (Win 24 – 18)

Tries – Matthew Wright, Ben Pomeroy, Jayson Bukuya, Stewart Mills

- Round 8 – Raiders vs Sharks (Win 22 - 44)

Tries – John Williams (2), Ben Pomeroy, Jayson Bukuya, John Morris, Stewart Mills, Jeff Robson, Colin Best

- Round 9 – Rabbitohs vs Sharks (Loss 34 - 28)

Tries - Todd Carney, Jeff Robson, Stewart Mills. Colin Best, Ben Pomeroy

- Round 10 – Sharks vs Storm (Win 12 - 10)

Tries – Isaac Gordon, Jeremy Smith

- Round 11 – Bulldogs vs Sharks (Loss 26 – 6)

Tries – Jeremy Smith

- Round 12 – BYE
- Round 13 – Eels vs Sharks (Loss 29 - 20)

Tries – Isaac Gordon, Colin Best, Paul Gallen

- Round 14 – Sharks vs Titans (Win 22 - 12)

Tries - Jeremy Smith, Chad Townsend, Colin Best, Isaac De Gois

- Round 15 – Sharks vs Warriors (Win 20 - 19)

Tries – Jeff Robson (2), Ben Pomeroy

- Round 16 – BYE
- Round 17 – Broncos - (Win 12 - 26)

Tries – Colin Best(2), Wade Graham, Ben Pomeroy Nathan Stapleton,

- Round 18 – Sharks vs Roosters (Drew 14 - 14)

Tries – Ricky Leutele, Ben Pomeroy

- Round 19 – Dragons vs Sharks (Loss 18 - 10)

Tries - Wade Graham(2)

- Round 20 – Sharks vs Raiders (Loss 4 - 36)

Tries - Mark Taufua

- Round 21 – Sharks vs Panthers (Loss 20 - 21)

Tries - Ricky Leutele(2), Jeff Robson, Tyson Frizell

- Round 22 – Warriors vs Sharks (Win 4 - 45)

Tries - Todd Carney(2), Andrew Fifita(2), John Williams(2), Jeff Robson

- Round 23 – Knights vs Sharks (Loss 26 - 4)

Tries - John Williams

- Round 24 – Sharks vs Rabbitohs (Win 20 - 7)

Tries - Andrew Fifita, Tyson Frizell, John Williams

- Round 25 – Storm vs Sharks - (Loss 20 - 18)

Tries - Sam Tagataese, Nathan Stapleton, Isaac Gordon

- Round 26 – Sharks vs Cowboys (Loss 22 - 36)

Tries - Colin Best, Isaac De Gois, Paul Gallen, Andrew Fifita

- Finals Week 1 - Raiders vs Sharks (Loss - 34 - 16)

Tries - Ricky Leutele, Wade Graham, Nathan Stapleton

== Team stats ==
(Regular Season)

- Most Points – Todd Carney - 139
- Most Tries – Ben Pomeroy - 9
- Most Conversions – Todd Carney - 46
- Most Penalty Goals – Todd Carney - 14
- Most Field Goals – Todd Carney - 3
- Most Try Assists – Todd Carney - 10
- Most Line Breaks – Colin Best - 13
- Most All Runs – Paul Gallen - 347
- Most Offloads – Paul Gallen - 48
- Most Kicks in Play – Todd Carney - 213
