= Andrew McCullough =

Australian rugby league footballer

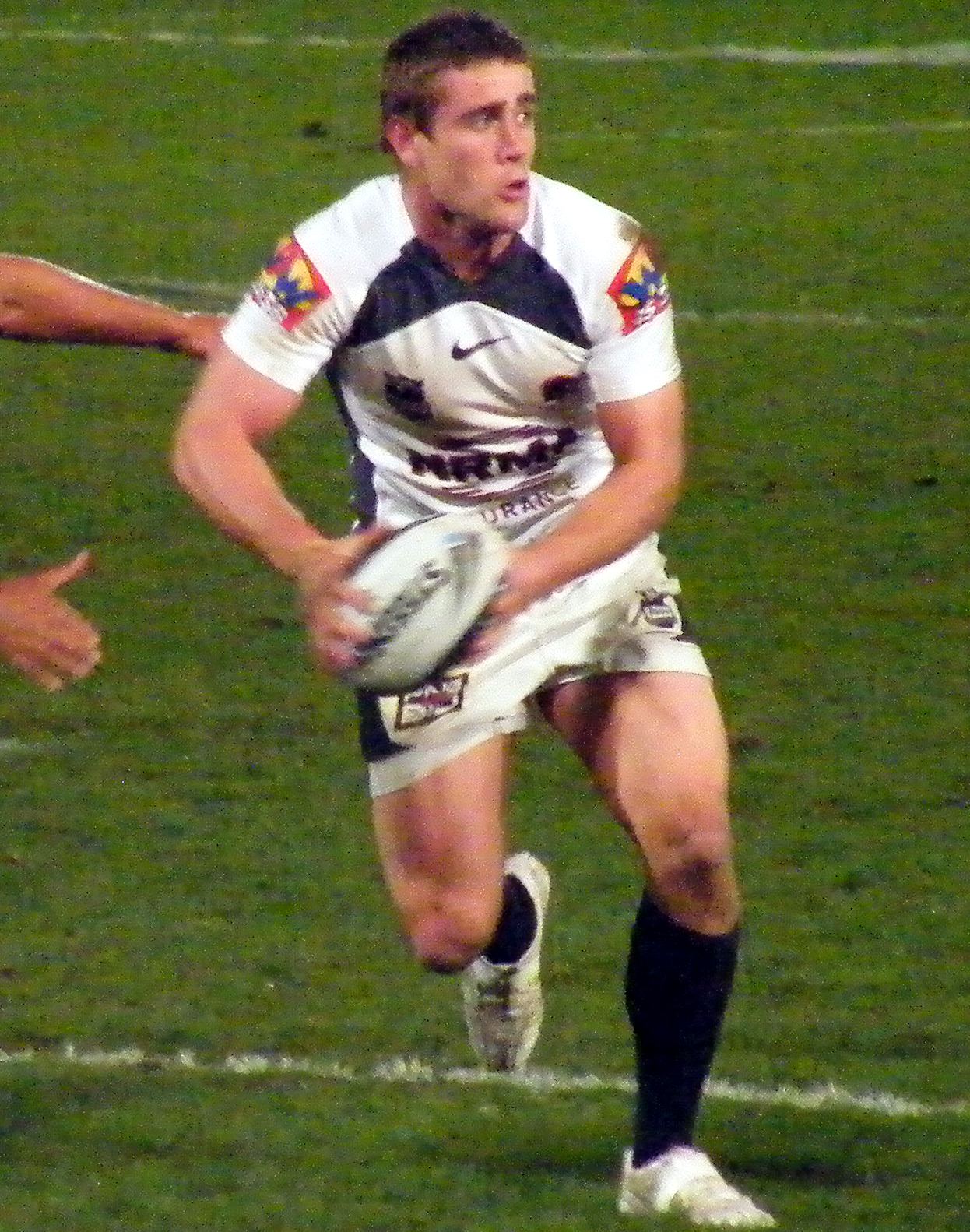

Personal information
- Born: 30 January 1990 (age 36) Dalby, Queensland, Australia
- Height: 180 cm (5 ft 11 in)
- Weight: 90 kg (14 st 2 lb)

Playing information
- Position: Hooker
Club
Years	Team	Pld	T	G	FG	P
2008–20	Brisbane Broncos	260	32	1	1	131
2020	Newcastle Knights	8	2	0	0	8
2021–22	St. George Illawarra	41	2	0	0	8
	Total	309	36	1	1	147
Representative
Years	Team	Pld	T	G	FG	P
2018–21	Queensland	4	0	0	0	0
- Source: As of 3 September 2022

Andrew McCullough (born 30 January 1990) is an Australian former professional rugby league footballer who played as a hooker for the Brisbane Broncos, Newcastle Knights, and St. George Illawarra Dragons in the National Rugby League (NRL), and has played for Queensland in the State of Origin series.

== Background ==
McCullough was born in Dalby, Queensland, Australia to Wendy and Graham McCullough.

In 2018, McCullough married Carlie Harrison in a ceremony at Byron Bay.

== Biography ==
McCullough attended Dalby State School and subsequently Dalby State High School, before accepting a scholarship to Brisbane State High School for grade 12. During his time in Dalby, he played for the Dalby Devils and on a number of school teams. He played for the Australian Schoolboys team in 2007 while attending Brisbane State High School. In 2003, while he was in grade 8, he had already signed with the Brisbane Broncos. He made his debut in the Telstra Premiership against the Cronulla-Sutherland Sharks on 17 May 2008, becoming the first player born in the 1990s to make his debut in the NRL's top grade. In 2009, he was named the Broncos' "Rookie of the Year".

McCullough was named the 2012 Brisbane Broncos season's player of the year. He played for the Broncos in their extra-time loss to the North Queensland Cowboys in the 2015 NRL Grand Final, and was selected to make his State of Origin debut for Queensland in 2018, starting all three games of that series at hooker following the retirement of former Queensland captain Cameron Smith.

After 260 games for the club, but by now being overlooked for a spot in the starting line-up ahead of the younger Jake Turpin, McCullough left the Broncos on 21 May 2020 to join the Newcastle Knights for the remainder of the 2020 season. He played in 8 matches for the Knights and scored two tries before having his season ended by a hamstring injury. He was then removed from the Knights' playing squad list to make way for the mid-season signing of Blake Green.

Newcastle chose not to renew McCullough's contract and he was able to return to Brisbane after taking up a player option in his contract for 2021.

On 15 February 2021, he signed a three-year deal to join St. George Illawarra. He made his debut for St. George Illawarra in round 1 of the 2021 NRL season against rivals Cronulla-Sutherland where the Dragons lost 32-18 at Kogarah Oval.

McCullough was selected for the Queensland Maroons in Game 2 of the 2021 State of Origin Series, following an injury to incumbent hooker Harry Grant. In round 22 of the 2021 NRL season, McCullough was taken from the field with an ankle injury in the Saints loss against Penrith. On 17 August 2021, it was announced that McCullough would be ruled out for the remainder of the season.

On 10 November 2022, McCullough announced his immediate retirement from rugby league with a year remaining on his contract with St. George Illawarra.

== Post playing ==
In February 2025, McCullough joined the Under 19s Queensland Origin squad as a forwards coach.

== Statistics ==
Season	Team	Pld	T	G	FG	P
2008	Brisbane Broncos	3	-	-	-	0
2009	Brisbane Broncos	26	2	-	-	8
2010	Brisbane Broncos	21	6	-	-	24
2011	Brisbane Broncos	26	2	-	-	8
2012	Brisbane Broncos	25	4	-	-	16
2013	Brisbane Broncos	24	3	-	-	12
2014	Brisbane Broncos	23	3	-	1	13
2015	Brisbane Broncos	27	5	-	-	20
2016	Brisbane Broncos	21	1	-	-	4
2017	Brisbane Broncos	18	2	-	-	8
2018	Brisbane Broncos	22	3	-	-	12
2019	Brisbane Broncos	22	1	1	-	6
2020	Brisbane Broncos	3	-	-	-	0
2020	Newcastle Knights	8	2	-	-	8
2021	St. George Illawarra Dragons	22	-	-	-	0
2022	St. George Illawarra Dragons	20	2	-	-	8
	Totals	309	36	1	1	147
