= 2012 NRL season =

105th season of professional rugby league club competition in Australia

2012 National Rugby League
- Duration: March 1 – September 30, 2012
- Teams: 16
- Premiers: Melbourne Storm (2nd title)
- Minor premiers: Canterbury-Bankstown Bulldogs (7th title)
- Matches played: 201
- Average attendance: 17,346
- Total attendance: 3,486,494
- Top points scorer: Jarrod Croker (226)
- Wooden spoon: Parramatta Eels (12th spoon)
- Dally M Medal: Ben Barba
- Top try-scorer: Ben Barba (22)

The 2012 NRL season was the 105th season of professional rugby league club competition in Australia, and the first run by the newly formed Australian Rugby League Commission. The main competition, called the 2012 NRL Telstra Premiership due to sponsorship from Telstra was contested by the sixteen teams of the National Rugby League. The season started with the 2012 NRL All Stars match and culminated in the 2012 NRL grand final. The 2012 Toyota Cup season also took place alongside the Premiership. The McIntyre final eight system, in use since 1999, was replaced with the finals system previously used by the ARL in the 1990s.

The 2012 Premiership was won by the Melbourne Storm, officially the club's second following the removal of their 2007 and 2009 premierships, among other titles, due to salary cap breaches exposed in April 2010. They defeated minor premiers the Canterbury-Bankstown Bulldogs 14-4 in the Grand Final, which was held on Sunday 30 September at ANZ Stadium in Sydney.

== Season summary ==
Halfway through the 2012 season, the NRL's Chief Executive Officer David Gallop stood down from his role after just over a decade in the role.

Records Set on 2012

- The Canterbury-Bankstown Bulldogs won twelve consecutive matches between Rounds 11 and 24, the longest winning streak for the club in 8 years. They also won their first minor premiership in 18 years.
- The Melbourne Storm lost five consecutive matches from rounds 16 to 21 (around a bye in round 17), the longest losing streak in Craig Bellamy's coaching career and the second longest losing streak in the club's history.
- For the first time since 1989, the South Sydney Rabbitohs finished in the top four, and they also won their first finals match since 1987.

=== Teams ===
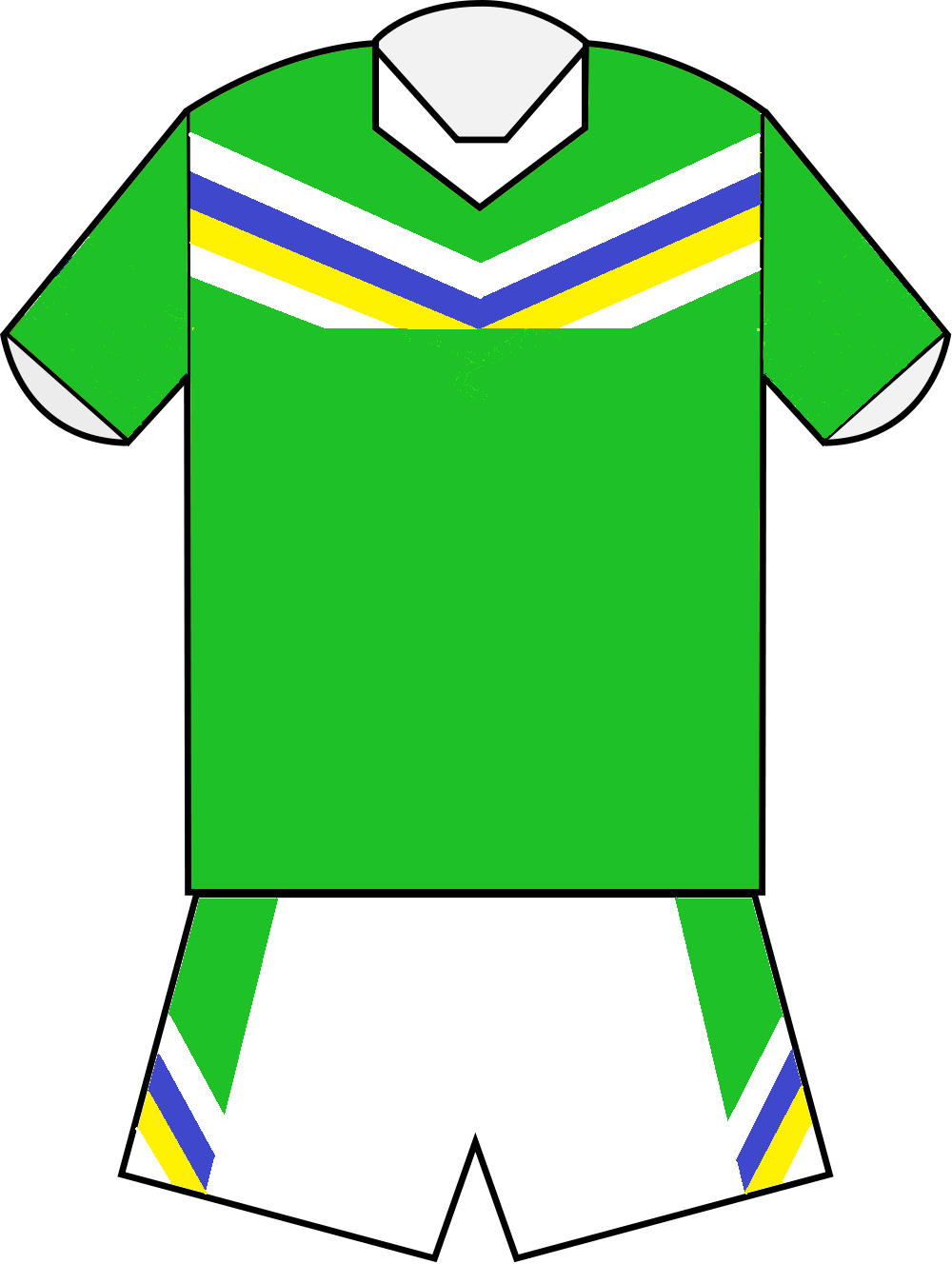
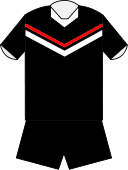
Brisbane Broncos; 25th season Ground: Suncorp Stadium; Coach: Anthony Griffin; Captain: Justin Hodges	Canberra Raiders; 31st season Ground: Canberra Stadium; Coach: David Furner; Captain: Terry Campese→David Shillington	Canterbury-Bankstown Bulldogs; 78th season Ground: ANZ Stadium; Coach:Des Hasler; Captain: Michael Ennis	Cronulla-Sutherland Sharks; 46th season Ground: Toyota Stadium; Coach: Shane Flanagan; Captain: Paul Gallen
Gold Coast Titans; 6th season Ground: Skilled Park; Coach: John Cartwright; Captain: Scott Prince	Manly Warringah Sea Eagles; 63rd season Grounds: Brookvale Oval; Coach: Geoff Toovey; Captains: Jamie Lyon & Jason King	Melbourne Storm; 15th season Ground: AAMI Park; Coach: Craig Bellamy; Captain: Cameron Smith	Newcastle Knights; 25th season Ground: Hunter Stadium; Coach: Wayne Bennett; Captain: Kurt Gidley→Danny Buderus
New Zealand Warriors; 18th season Ground: Mt. Smart Stadium; Coach: Brian McClennan→Tony Iro; Captain: Simon Mannering	North Queensland Cowboys; 18th season Ground: Dairy Farmers Stadium; Coach: Neil Henry; Captains: Johnathan Thurston & Matt Scott	Parramatta Eels; 66th season Ground: Parramatta Stadium; Coach: Stephen Kearney→Brad Arthur; Captain: Nathan Hindmarsh	Penrith Panthers; 46th season Ground: Centrebet Stadium; Coach:Ivan Cleary; Captain: Luke Lewis→Kevin Kingston
South Sydney Rabbitohs; 103rd season Ground: ANZ Stadium; Coach: Michael Maguire; Captains: Michael Crocker, Roy Asotasi, John Sutton, Matt King, Sam Burgess,	Sydney Roosters; 105th season Ground: Allianz Stadium; Coach: Brian Smith; Captain: Braith Anasta	St. George Illawarra Dragons; 14th season Grounds: WIN Jubilee Oval & WIN Stadium; Coach: Steve Price; Captain: Ben Hornby	Wests Tigers; 13th season Grounds: Allianz Stadium, Campbelltown Stadium & Leichhardt Oval; Coach: Tim Sheens; Captain: Robbie Farah

== Ladder ==
2012 NRL season
Pos	Team	Pld	W	D	L	B	PF	PA	PD	Pts
1	Canterbury-Bankstown Bulldogs	24	18	0	6	2	568	369	+199	40
2	Melbourne Storm (P)	24	17	0	7	2	579	361	+218	38
3	South Sydney Rabbitohs	24	16	0	8	2	559	438	+121	36
4	Manly Warringah Sea Eagles	24	16	0	8	2	497	403	+94	36
5	North Queensland Cowboys	24	15	0	9	2	597	445	+152	34
6	Canberra Raiders	24	13	0	11	2	545	536	+9	30
7	Cronulla-Sutherland Sharks	24	12	1	11	2	445	441	+4	29
8	Brisbane Broncos	24	12	0	12	2	481	447	+34	28
9	St. George Illawarra Dragons	24	11	0	13	2	405	438	-33	26
10	Wests Tigers	24	11	0	13	2	506	551	-45	26
11	Gold Coast Titans	24	10	0	14	2	449	477	-28	24
12	Newcastle Knights	24	10	0	14	2	448	488	-40	24
13	Sydney Roosters	24	8	1	15	2	462	626	-164	21
14	New Zealand Warriors	24	8	0	16	2	497	609	-112	20
15	Penrith Panthers	24	8	0	16	2	409	575	-166	20
16	Parramatta Eels	24	6	0	18	2	431	674	-243	16

=== Ladder progression ===
- Numbers highlighted in green indicate that the team finished the round inside the top 8.
- Numbers highlighted in blue indicates the team finished first on the ladder in that round.
- Numbers highlighted in red indicates the team finished last place on the ladder in that round.
- Underlined numbers indicate that the team had a bye during that round.

	Team	1	2	3	4	5	6	7	8	9	10	11	12	13	14	15	16	17	18	19	20	21	22	23	24	25	26
1	Canterbury-Bankstown	2	4	6	6	8	8	8	8	10	10	12	14	16	18	20	22	24	26	28	30	32	34	36	38	38	40
2	Melbourne	2	4	6	8	10	12	14	16	18	18	20	22	24	24	26	26	28	28	28	28	28	30	32	34	36	38
3	South Sydney	0	0	2	2	4	6	6	8	10	12	14	16	16	18	20	20	22	24	26	28	30	32	32	32	34	36
4	Manly-Warringah	2	4	4	4	4	6	6	8	10	12	14	14	16	18	18	20	22	24	24	24	26	28	30	32	34	36
5	North Queensland	0	2	4	4	6	6	8	8	10	12	14	14	14	16	18	20	20	22	24	26	26	26	28	30	32	34
6	Canberra	0	2	2	4	4	6	6	6	6	8	10	10	10	12	14	14	16	18	18	20	20	22	24	26	28	30
7	Cronulla-Sutherland	0	0	2	4	6	8	10	12	12	14	14	16	16	18	20	22	24	25	25	25	25	27	27	29	29	29
8	Brisbane	2	2	4	6	8	10	12	14	14	14	16	16	18	20	20	22	22	24	26	26	26	26	26	26	26	28
9	St. George Illawarra	2	2	4	6	6	6	8	10	10	10	10	12	12	14	14	16	16	18	20	20	22	22	22	22	24	26
10	Wests	2	2	2	2	2	2	4	6	8	10	12	14	16	18	18	18	20	20	22	22	22	24	26	26	26	26
11	Gold Coast	2	2	2	2	2	2	4	4	4	6	8	10	12	12	14	14	16	16	18	20	22	22	22	24	24	24
12	Newcastle	0	2	2	4	4	6	6	8	8	8	10	10	10	10	12	14	16	16	18	20	22	22	24	24	24	24
13	Sydney	2	2	4	4	6	8	8	8	10	10	10	10	12	12	14	14	16	17	17	17	17	19	19	19	21	21
14	New Zealand	0	2	2	4	4	4	6	6	8	10	10	12	12	14	14	16	18	20	20	20	20	20	20	20	20	20
15	Penrith	0	2	2	4	4	4	4	4	4	6	6	8	10	10	10	10	10	12	12	14	16	16	16	18	20	20
16	Parramatta	0	0	0	0	2	2	2	2	2	2	4	4	6	8	8	10	10	10	10	12	14	14	16	16	16	16

== Finals series ==
For details on the finals see 2012 NRL season results.

The NRL returned to the top-eight system used by the ARL in the 1990s to decide the grand finalists from the top eight finishing teams. This replaced the McIntyre final eight system that was used for the past 12 seasons. Only four of last year's finalists were featured in this year's finals series: Melbourne Storm, Manly-Warringah Sea Eagles, Brisbane Broncos and the North Queensland Cowboys. For the teams that did not feature last year, the Canberra Raiders last appeared in 2010, the Canterbury-Bankstown Bulldogs in 2009, the Cronulla-Sutherland Sharks in 2008 and South Sydney in 2007. South Sydney made only their second finals appearance since 1989 and also their second preliminary final since winning the premiership in 1971. The last time the club made the preliminary final was also in 1989.

Home	Score	Away	Match Information
Home	Score	Away	Date and Time (Local)	Venue	Referees	Crowd
QUALIFYING & ELIMINATION FINALS
Canterbury Bankstown Bulldogs	16 – 10	Manly Warringah Sea Eagles	7 September 2012, 7:45pm	ANZ Stadium	Ben Cummins; Ashley Klein	36,420
Melbourne Storm	24 – 6	South Sydney Rabbitohs	8 September 2012, 5:45pm	AAMI Park	Shayne Hayne; Jason Robinson	19,750
North Queensland Cowboys	33 – 16	Brisbane Broncos	8 September 2012, 7:45pm	Dairy Farmers Stadium	Matt Cecchin; Gerard Sutton	21,307
Canberra Raiders	34 – 16	Cronulla-Sutherland Sharks	9 September 2012, 4:00pm	Canberra Stadium	Tony Archer; Chris James	24,450
SEMI FINALS
Manly Warringah Sea Eagles	22 – 12	North Queensland Cowboys	14 September 2012, 7:45pm	Allianz Stadium	Shayne Hayne; Ben Cummins	16,678
South Sydney Rabbitohs	38 – 16	Canberra Raiders	15 September 2012, 7:45pm	ANZ Stadium	Tony Archer; Matt Cecchin	35,874
PRELIMINARY FINALS
Melbourne Storm	40 – 12	Manly Warringah Sea Eagles	21 September 2012, 7:45pm	AAMI Park	Matt Cecchin; Tony Archer	25,543
Canterbury Bankstown Bulldogs	32 – 8	South Sydney Rabbitohs	22 September 2012, 7:45pm	ANZ Stadium	Shayne Hayne; Ben Cummins	70,354

=== Chart ===
Qualifying and elimination finals
7 Sept, ANZ Stadium
1	Canterbury-Bankstown	16
4	Manly-Warringah	10
8 Sept, Dairy Farmers Stadium
5	North Queensland	33
8	Brisbane	16
9 Sept, Canberra Stadium
6	Canberra	34
7	Cronulla-Sutherland	16
8 Sept, AAMI Park
2	Melbourne	24
3	South Sydney	6

Semi-finals
14 Sept, Allianz Stadium
Manly-Warringah	22
North Queensland	12
15 Sept, ANZ Stadium
South Sydney	38
Canberra	16

Preliminary finals
22 Sept, ANZ Stadium
Canterbury-Bankstown	32
South Sydney	8
21 Sept, AAMI Park
Melbourne	40
Manly-Warringah	12

Grand final
30 Sept, ANZ Stadium
Canterbury-Bankstown	4
Melbourne	14

== Grand final ==
2012 NRL Grand Final

Sunday, 30 September
17:00 AEST (UTC+10)

Canterbury-Bankstown Bulldogs	4 – 14	Melbourne Storm
Tries: 1 Perrett 25'; Goals: Inu (0/1)	1st: 4–14; 2nd: 0–0; Report	Tries: 3 Hoffman 7'; Slater 32'; O'Neill 39'; Goals: 1 Smith 32' (1/3)

ANZ Stadium, Sydney
Attendance: 82,976
Referees: Tony Archer, Ben Cummins
Clive Churchill Medal: Cooper Cronk (Melbourne)

== Regular season player statistics ==
The following statistics are correct as of the conclusion of Round 26.

Top 5 point scorers

Points	Player	Tries	Goals	Field Goals
220	Jarrod Croker	16	78	0
184	Adam Reynolds	2	87	2
176	Johnathan Thurston	3	82	0
172	Jamie Lyon	9	68	0
158	Benji Marshall	5	72	3

Top 5 try scorers

Tries	Player
21	Ben Barba
21	Ashley Graham
18	Akuila Uate
17	Josh Morris
16	Reece Robinson
16	Jarrod Croker

Top 5 goal scorers

Goals	Player
87	Adam Reynolds
82	Johnathan Thurston
78	Jarrod Croker
72	Benji Marshall
68	Jamie Lyon
68	Cameron Smith

== Attendance figures ==
=== Home ground figures ===
Club	Total	Average	Best Crowd
Brisbane Broncos	400,528	33,377	43,171 vs North Queensland Cowboys, Round 2
Canterbury Bulldogs	282,864	23,572	70,354 vs South Sydney Rabbitohs, Finals Week 3
Newcastle Knights	251,024	20,919	29,482 vs Canterbury Bulldogs, Round 22
South Sydney Rabbitohs	226,848	18,904	35,874 vs Canberra Raiders, Finals Week 2
New Zealand Warriors	205,334	17,111	37,502 vs Manly Sea Eagles, Round 1 ^{2}
Parramatta Eels	201,663	16,803	45,863 vs St George Illawarra Dragons, Round 26
St George Illawarra Dragons	197,111	16,426	40,164 vs Sydney Roosters, Round 8 ^{3}
Wests Tigers	194,726	16,227	25,608 vs South Sydney Rabbitohs, Round 5
Manly Sea Eagles	175,120	14,593	20,095 vs New Zealand Warriors, Round 21 ^{4}
North Queensland Cowboys	172,978	14,415	20,367 vs Brisbane Broncos, Round 15
Gold Coast Titans	172,865	14,405	20,187 vs South Sydney Rabbitohs, Round 22
Cronulla Sharks	158,802	13,234	21,380 vs St George Illawarra Dragons, Round 6
Melbourne Storm	152,217	12,685	25,534 vs Manly Sea Eagles, Finals Week 3
Sydney Roosters	149,790	12,482	19,934 vs South Sydney Rabbitohs, Round 19
Penrith Panthers	130,301	10,858	15,579 vs Wests Tigers, Round 7
Canberra Raiders	122,274	10,190	24,450 vs Cronulla Sharks, Finals Week 1

== 2012 Transfers ==
=== Players ===
Player	2011 Club	2012 Club
Nick Kenny	Brisbane Broncos	Retirement
Darren Lockyer	Brisbane Broncos	Retirement
Shane Tronc	Brisbane Broncos	Retirement
Danny Galea	Canberra Raiders	Penrith Panthers
Josh Miller	Canberra Raiders	St. George Illawarra Dragons
David Milne	Canberra Raiders	Mackay Cutters (Intrust Super Cup)
Matt Orford	Canberra Raiders	Retirement
Alan Tongue	Canberra Raiders	Retirement
Daniel Vidot	Canberra Raiders	St. George Illawarra Dragons
Chris Armit	Canterbury-Bankstown Bulldogs	Penrith Panthers
Michael Hodgson	Canterbury-Bankstown Bulldogs	Retirement
Jamal Idris	Canterbury-Bankstown Bulldogs	Gold Coast Titans
Grant Millington	Canterbury-Bankstown Bulldogs	Super League: Castleford Tigers
Mickey Paea	Canterbury-Bankstown Bulldogs	Super League: Hull Kingston Rovers
Ben Roberts	Canterbury-Bankstown Bulldogs	Parramatta Eels
Andrew Ryan	Canterbury-Bankstown Bulldogs	Retirement
Gary Warburton	Canterbury-Bankstown Bulldogs	Retirement
Paul Aiton	Cronulla-Sutherland Sharks	Super League: Wakefield Trinity Wildcats
Dean Collis	Cronulla-Sutherland Sharks	Super League: Wakefield Trinity Wildcats
Josh Cordoba	Cronulla-Sutherland Sharks	N/A
Luke Douglas	Cronulla-Sutherland Sharks	Gold Coast Titans
Tim Smith	Cronulla-Sutherland Sharks	Super League: Wakefield Trinity Wildcats
Kade Snowden	Cronulla-Sutherland Sharks	Newcastle Knights
Taulima Tautai	Cronulla-Sutherland Sharks	Parramatta Eels
Riley Brown	Gold Coast Titans	Retirement
Preston Campbell	Gold Coast Titans	Retirement
Luke Capewell	Gold Coast Titans	Brisbane Broncos
Nathan Friend	Gold Coast Titans	New Zealand Warriors
Anthony Laffranchi	Gold Coast Titans	Super League: St. Helens
Will Matthews	Gold Coast Titans	St. George Illawarra Dragons
Brad Meyers	Gold Coast Titans	Retirement
Mat Rogers	Gold Coast Titans	Retirement
Sam Tagataese	Gold Coast Titans	Cronulla-Sutherland Sharks
Joe Tomane	Gold Coast Titans	ACT Brumbies (Super Rugby)
Esikeli Tonga	Gold Coast Titans	Parramatta Eels
Clinton Toopi	Gold Coast Titans	Retirement
Michael Robertson	Manly Warringah Sea Eagles	Super League: London Broncos
Shane Rodney	Manly Warringah Sea Eagles	Super League: London Broncos
Terence Seu Seu	Manly Warringah Sea Eagles	Retirement
Adam Blair	Melbourne Storm	Wests Tigers
Beau Champion	Melbourne Storm	Gold Coast Titans
Chase Stanley	Melbourne Storm	St. George Illawarra Dragons
Troy Thompson	Melbourne Storm	Retirement
Adam Woolnough	Melbourne Storm	Retirement
Cameron Ciraldo	Newcastle Knights	Penrith Panthers
Isaac De Gois	Newcastle Knights	Cronulla-Sutherland Sharks
Antonio Kaufusi	Newcastle Knights	Super League: London Broncos
Keith Lulia	Newcastle Knights	Super League: Bradford Bulls
Adam MacDougall	Newcastle Knights	Retirement
Shannon McDonnell	Newcastle Knights	Super League: Hull Kingston Rovers
Cory Paterson	Newcastle Knights	North Queensland Cowboys
Ben Rogers	Newcastle Knights	Retirement
Steve Southern	Newcastle Knights	Super League: Wakefield Trinity Wildcats
Mark Taufua	Newcastle Knights	Cronulla-Sutherland Sharks
Daniel Tolar	Newcastle Knights	Retirement
Shaun Berrigan	New Zealand Warriors	Canberra Raiders
Aaron Heremaia	New Zealand Warriors	Super League: Hull F.C.
Lance Hohaia	New Zealand Warriors	Super League: St. Helens
Krisnan Inu	New Zealand Warriors	Canterbury-Bankstown Bulldogs
Jeremy Latimore	New Zealand Warriors	St. George Illawarra Dragons
Joel Moon	New Zealand Warriors	Super League: Salford City Reds
Brett Seymour	New Zealand Warriors	Super League: Hull F.C.
Leeson Ah Mau	North Queensland Cowboys	St. George Illawarra Dragons
Willie Tonga	North Queensland Cowboys	Parramatta Eels
Chris Hicks	Parramatta Eels	Retirement
Manase Manuokafoa	Parramatta Eels	Super League: Bradford Bulls
Daniel Mortimer	Parramatta Eels	Sydney Roosters
Joel Reddy	Parramatta Eels	Wests Tigers
Jeff Robson	Parramatta Eels	Cronulla-Sutherland Sharks
Shane Shackleton	Parramatta Eels	Penrith Panthers
Chris Walker	Parramatta Eels	Retirement
Carl Webb	Parramatta Eels	Retirement
Paul Whatuira	Parramatta Eels	Retirement
Matthew Bell	Penrith Panthers	Wests Tigers
Petero Civoniceva	Penrith Panthers	Brisbane Broncos
Yileen Gordon	Penrith Panthers	Retirement
Masada Iosefa	Penrith Panthers	Wests Tigers
Joseph Paulo	Penrith Panthers	Parramatta Eels
Adrian Purtell	Penrith Panthers	Super League: Bradford Bulls
Timana Tahu	Penrith Panthers	Newcastle Knights
Trent Waterhouse	Penrith Panthers	Super League: Warrington Wolves
Beau Falloon	South Sydney Rabbitohs	Gold Coast Titans
Shannan McPherson	South Sydney Rabbitohs	Super League: Salford City Reds
Ben Ross	South Sydney Rabbitohs	Cronulla-Sutherland Sharks
Chris Sandow	South Sydney Rabbitohs	Parramatta Eels
Luke Stuart	South Sydney Rabbitohs	Retirement
Rhys Wesser	South Sydney Rabbitohs	Retirement
Darius Boyd	St. George Illawarra Dragons	Newcastle Knights
Adam Cuthbertson	St. George Illawarra Dragons	Newcastle Knights
Mark Gasnier	St. George Illawarra Dragons	Retirement
Jon Green	St. George Illawarra Dragons	Cronulla-Sutherland Sharks
Michael Greenfield	St. George Illawarra Dragons	Melbourne Storm
Reece Simmonds	St. George Illawarra Dragons	Retirement
Todd Carney	Sydney Roosters	Cronulla-Sutherland Sharks
Daniel Conn	Sydney Roosters	Retirement
Phil Graham	Sydney Roosters	Gold Coast Titans
Nate Myles	Sydney Roosters	Gold Coast Titans
Sam Perrett	Sydney Roosters	Canterbury-Bankstown Bulldogs
Mark Riddell	Sydney Roosters	Retirement
Jason Ryles	Sydney Roosters	Melbourne Storm
Geoff Daniela	Wests Tigers	Penrith Panthers
Andrew Fifita	Wests Tigers	Cronulla-Sutherland Sharks
Mark Flanagan	Wests Tigers	Super League: St. Helens
Bryce Gibbs	Wests Tigers	Cronulla-Sutherland Sharks
Robert Lui	Wests Tigers	North Queensland Cowboys
Wade McKinnon	Wests Tigers	Super League: Hull F.C.
Todd Payten	Wests Tigers	Retirement
Clint Newton	Super League: Hull Kingston Rovers	Penrith Panthers
Danny Buderus	Super League: Leeds Rhinos	Newcastle Knights
Luke Burgess	Super League: Leeds Rhinos	South Sydney Rabbitohs
Ray Cashmere	Super League: Salford City Reds	Wests Tigers
James Graham	Super League: St. Helens	Canterbury-Bankstown Bulldogs
Matt King	Super League: Warrington Wolves	South Sydney Rabbitohs
Ryan Hoffman	Super League: Wigan Warriors	Melbourne Storm
Luke MacDougall	Saracens F.C. (English rugby union)	Canterbury-Bankstown Bulldogs
Dimitri Pelo	Montpellier Hérault (French rugby union)	Canberra Raiders
Willie Mason	RC Toulonnais (French rugby union)	Newcastle Knights
Will Chambers	Munster (Irish rugby union)	Melbourne Storm

=== Coaches ===
Coach	2011 Club	2012 Club
Des Hasler	Manly Warringah Sea Eagles	Canterbury-Bankstown Bulldogs
Ivan Cleary	New Zealand Warriors	Penrith Panthers
Wayne Bennett	St. George Illawarra Dragons	Newcastle Knights
Michael Maguire	Super League: Wigan Warriors	South Sydney Rabbitohs
Brian McClennan	N/A	New Zealand Warriors

== See also ==
- 2012 NRL season results
- 2012 NRL Under-20s season
