= Shaune Corrigan =

Australian rugby league footballer

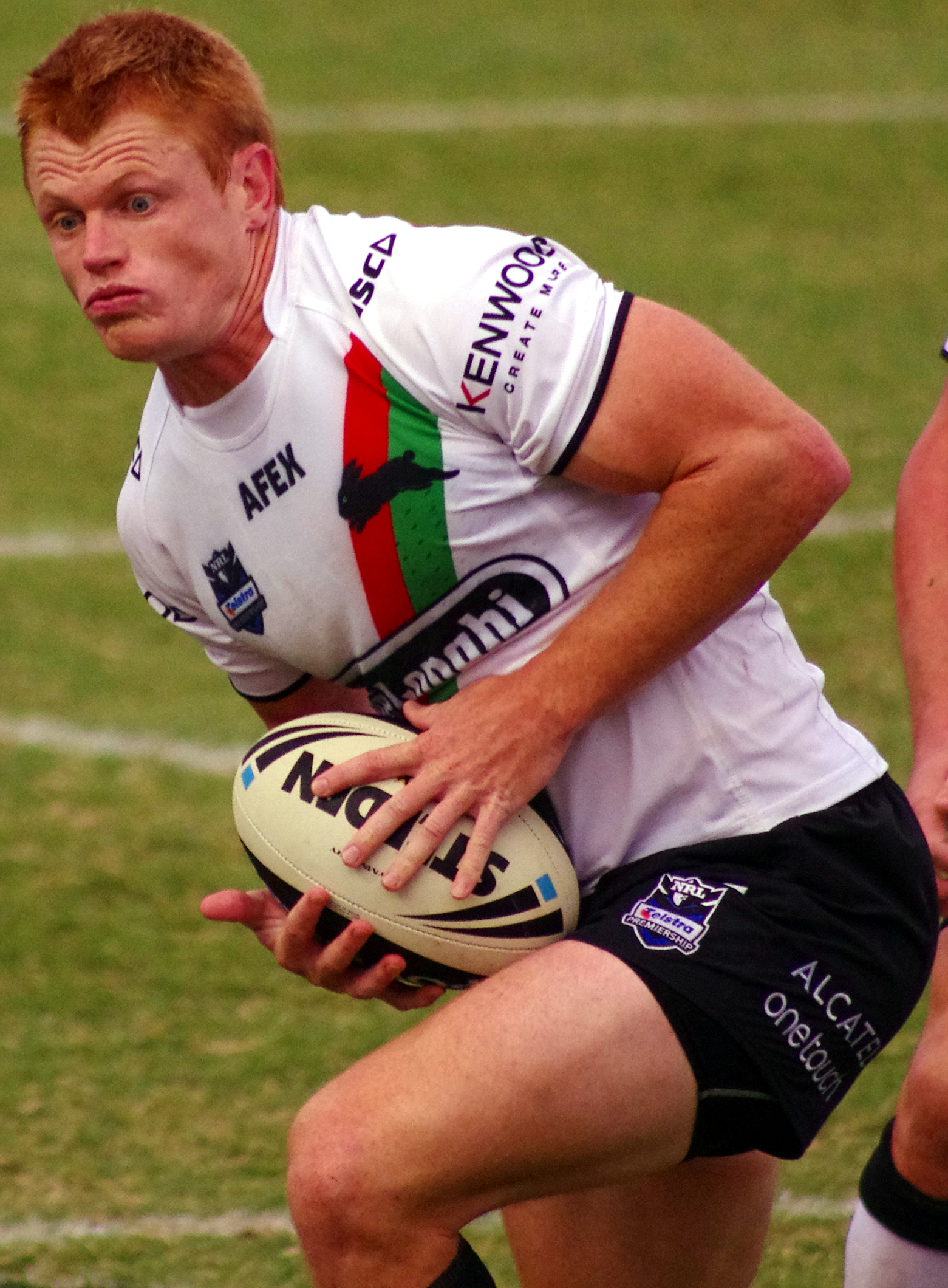

Personal information
- Born: 7 October 1987 (age 39) Gosford, New South Wales, Australia
- Height: 185 cm (6 ft 1 in)
- Weight: 95 kg (14 st 13 lb)

Playing information
- Position: Centre, Wing
Club
Years	Team	Pld	T	G	FG	P
2009–12	South Sydney	26	4	0	0	16
Representative
Years	Team	Pld	T	G	FG	P
2013	NSW Residents	1	1	0	0	4
- Source: As of 9 January 2024

Shaune Corrigan (born 7 October 1987) is a rugby league footballer who captains The Entrance Tigers in the NSW Cup. He plays as centre or winger. He previously played for the South Sydney Rabbitohs.

== Background ==
Corrigan was born in Gosford, New South Wales, Australia.

== Playing career ==
Corrigan, whilst playing for the North Sydney Bears in the NSW Cup competition was selected in the annual NSW Residents clash against Queensland residents in July 2013, playing and scoring a try in the curtain-raiser to the State of Origin decider.

Corrigan made a total of 26 appearances for South Sydney in the NRL and 63 appearances for North Sydney in the NSW Cup.
