= 2012 Canterbury-Bankstown Bulldogs season =

Canterbury-Bankstown Bulldogs
- 2012 season
- CEO: Todd Greenberg
- Head coach: Des Hasler
- Captain: Michael Ennis
- NRL: Runners Up
- Top try scorer: Club: Ben Barba (22)
- Top points scorer: Club: Krisnan Inu 148

The 2012 Canterbury-Bankstown Bulldogs season was the 78th in the club's history. Coached by Des Hasler and captained by Michael Ennis, they competed in the National Rugby League's 2012 Telstra Premiership, finishing the regular season in 1st place to take the minor premiership. They then won both of their finals matches to reach the 2012 NRL Grand final but were defeated by the Melbourne Storm.

== Season summary ==
Having just won the 2011 NRL Grand final with the Manly-Warringah Sea Eagles, coach Des Hasler left the club to be head coach of the Bulldogs.

Under the NRL's revised final eight system, the Bulldogs only played two home finals matches, winning both of them to reach the grand final.

The club were the first in almost 50 years to win all three minor premierships, however none of the three teams were able to win a grand final.

=== Draw and results ===
Round	Home	Score	Away	Match information
Round	Home	Score	Away	Date and time	Venue
TRIAL 1	St. George Illawarra Dragons	18–28	Canterbury Bankstown Bulldogs	Sat 4 Feb 2012, 6:00pm AEDT	Wollongong Showground
TRIAL 2	Canterbury Bankstown Bulldogs	16–28	Sydney Roosters	Sun 12 Feb 2012, 5:00pm AEDT	Belmore Sports Ground
TRIAL 3	Canberra Raiders	16–14	Canterbury Bankstown Bulldogs	Sat 18 Feb 2012, 7:00pm AEDT	McDonalds Park, Wagga Wagga
1	Penrith Panthers	14–22	Canterbury Bankstown Bulldogs	Sat 3 Mar 2012, 7:30pm AEDT	Penrith Stadium
2	Canterbury Bankstown Bulldogs	30–4	St. George Illawarra Dragons	Sat 10 Mar 2012, 7:30pm AEDT	Stadium Australia
3	New Zealand Warriors	18–32	Canterbury Bankstown Bulldogs	Sun 18 Mar 2012, 2:00pm NZST	Mount Smart Stadium
4	Canterbury Bankstown Bulldogs	6–20	Newcastle Knights	Sun 25 Mar 2012, 3:00pm AEDT	Stadium Australia
5	Gold Coast Titans	20–30	Canterbury Bankstown Bulldogs	Sun 1 Apr 2012, 2:00pm AEST	Robina Stadium
6	South Sydney Rabbitohs	20–10	Canterbury Bankstown Bulldogs	Fri 6 Apr 2012, 4:00pm AEST	Stadium Australia
7	Melbourne Storm	12–6	Canterbury Bankstown Bulldogs	Sat 14 Apr 2012, 5:30pm AEST	Melbourne Rectangular Stadium
8	Canterbury Bankstown Bulldogs	10–12	Manly-Warringah Sea Eagles	Fri 27 Apr 2012, 7:35pm AEST	Stadium Australia
9	Parramatta Eels	12–46	Canterbury Bankstown Bulldogs	Fri 4 May 2012, 7:35pm AEST	Stadium Australia
10	Canterbury Bankstown Bulldogs	14–25	Gold Coast Titans	Fri 11 May 2012, 8:30pm AEST	Suncorp Stadium
11	Canterbury Bankstown Bulldogs	26–6	Cronulla-Sutherland Sharks	Mon 21 May 2012, 7:00pm AEST	Stadium Australia
12	Sydney Roosters	12–30	Canterbury Bankstown Bulldogs	Mon 28 May 2012, 7:00pm AEST	Sydney Football Stadium
13	Canterbury Bankstown Bulldogs	23–18	South Sydney Rabbitohs	Sat 2 Jun 2012, 7:35pm AEST	Stadium Australia
14		BYE
15	St. George Illawarra Dragons	20–28	Canterbury Bankstown Bulldogs	Fri 15 Jun 2012, 7:35pm AEST	Wollongong Showground
16	Canterbury Bankstown Bulldogs	20–4	Melbourne Storm	Sun 24 Jun 2012, 2:00pm AEST	Virgin Australia Stadium
17		BYE
18	Wests Tigers	20–32	Canterbury Bankstown Bulldogs	Fri 6 Jul 2012, 7:45pm AEST	Sydney Football Stadium
19	Canterbury Bankstown Bulldogs	32–12	Parramatta Eels	Fri 13 Jul 2012, 7:35 AEST	Stadium Australia
20	Manly-Warringah Sea Eagles	12–20	Canterbury Bankstown Bulldogs	Fri 20 Jul 2012, 7:35pm AEST	Brookvale Oval
21	Canterbury Bankstown Bulldogs	32–18	North Queensland Cowboys	Sat 28 Jul 2012, 5:30pm AEST	Stadium Australia
22	Newcastle Knights	10–26	Canterbury Bankstown Bulldogs	Sat 4 Aug 2012, 5:30pm AEST	Newcastle International Sports Centre
23	Canterbury Bankstown Bulldogs	22–14	Brisbane Broncos	Sun 12 Aug 2012, 3:00pm AEST	Stadium Australia
24	Canterbury Bankstown Bulldogs	23–22	Wests Tigers	Fri 17 Aug 2012, 7:35pm AEST	Stadium Australia
25	Canberra Raiders	34–6	Canterbury Bankstown Bulldogs	Fri 24 Aug 2012, 7:35pm AEST	Canberra Stadium
26	Canterbury Bankstown Bulldogs	42–10	Sydney Roosters	Sat 1 Sep 2012, 7:30pm AEST	Stadium Australia
Finals Week 1	Canterbury Bankstown Bulldogs	16–10	Manly-Warringah Sea Eagles	Fri 7 Sep 2012, 7:35pm AEST	Stadium Australia
Finals Week 3	Canterbury Bankstown Bulldogs	32–8	South Sydney Rabbitohs	Sat 22 Sep 2012, 7:35pm AEST	Stadium Australia
GRAND FINAL	Canterbury Bankstown Bulldogs	4–14	Melbourne Storm	Sun 30 Sep 2012, 5:00pm AEST	Stadium Australia

== 2012 squad ==
2012 Canterbury Bulldogs Season
First team squad			Coaching staff
Ben Barba – FB, FE; Mitch Brown – FB, WG, CE; Tim Browne – SR, PR; Greg Eastwood – SR, LK; Michael Ennis – HK; Dale Finucane – LK; Jake Foster – LK, FE, SR; James Gavet – PR; Bryson Goodwin – WG, FB, CE; James Graham – PR; Dene Halatau – LK, HK, CE, SR; Trent Hodkinson – HB; Krisnan Inu – CE, WG	Josh Jackson – SR; Sam Kasiano – PR; Kris Keating – FE, HB; Tim Lafai – CE; Michael Lett – WG, CE, FB; Luke MacDougall – WG; Josh Morris – WG, CE, FB; Corey Payne – SR; Sam Perrett; Frank Pritchard – SR; Josh Reynolds – HB; Joel Romelo – HK; David Stagg – LK, SR	Martin Taupau – PR; Aiden Tolman – PR, SR; Steve Turner – WG; Jonathan Wright – CE, WG	Head coach: Des Hasler; Jim Dymock – Assistant Coach; Harry Harris – High Performance Coach; Tony Grimaldi – Head Conditioner; Tony Ayoub – Physiotherapist; Dr Joe Lombardo – Club Doctor; John Novak – Head of Mind Management Brett Kimmorley – Specialist Coach; Fred Ciraldo – Team Manager; Garry Carden – Assistant Strength & Conditioning Coach; Steve McCullagh – Assistant Physiotherapist; Larry Britton – Head Trainer; Dr Hugh Hazzard – Medical Consultant; Andy Patmore – NYC Coach & Manager Coaching and Development; Barry Ward – NSW Cup Coach Legend: (c) Captain(s); (vc) Vice-captain(s); Injured; Updated: 25 May 2011; Source(s): Bulldogs NRL Squad, Bulldogs Coaching Staff

*Flags mean countries that players represent.

== 2012 Signings/transfers ==
Signings

- Des Hasler Manly-Warringah Sea Eagles – Head Coach
- Noel Cleal Manly-Warringah Sea Eagles – Recruitment Manager
- James Graham ESL – St. Helens
- James Gavet – Vulcans NSW Cup
- Luke MacDougall – Saracens
- Sione Kite – Melbourne Storm

Re-signed

- David Stagg till 2012
- Jake Foster till 2013
- Corey Payne till 2013
- Josh Morris till 2014
- Michael Ennis till 2014
- Ben Barba till 2015
- Steve Turner till 2012
- Bryson Goodwin till 2012
- Tim Browne till 2013
- Joel Romelo till 2012
- Michael Lett till 2012

Transfers/leaving

- Jarrad Hickey – Mid-Season – Wakefield Trinity Wildcats ESL
- Jamal Idris – Gold Coast Titans
- Ben Roberts – Parramatta Eels
- Michael Hodgson – Retired
- Andrew Ryan – Retired
- Chris Armit – Penrith Panthers
- Brad Morrin – Retired
- Junior Tia-Kilifi – Penrith Panthers
- Mickey Paea – Hull Kingston Rovers

== See also ==
- List of Canterbury-Bankstown Bulldogs seasons
