= 2012 Wests Tigers season =

Wests Tigers
- 2012 season
- CEO: Stephen Humphreys
- Head coach: Tim Sheens
- Captain: Robbie Farah
- NRL: 10th
- Toyota Cup: 4th (Premiers)
- NSW Cup: 8th
- Top try scorer: Club: Tim Moltzen (12)
- Top points scorer: Club: Benji Marshall (167)
- Highest home attendance: 25,608
- Lowest home attendance: 10,546
- Average home attendance: 16,227

The 2012 Wests Tigers season was the club's 13th season as a joint-venture. They competed in the National Rugby League's 2012 Telstra Premiership, finishing the regular season in 10th place out of the 16 teams that competed. In doing so, they failed to make the top eight for the first time since 2009.

== Season summary ==
During the off season, the Wests Tigers were listed as favourites to take out the 2012 NRL premiership. After preseason victories against the Parramatta Eels and the Sydney Roosters, the Tigers were well placed to have a successful 2012 season. With new players that they signed in the off season such as Joel Reddy and Adam Blair, the team seemed well placed to win their second premiership title.

Coached by Tim Sheens and captained by Robbie Farah, the team started the season with a thrilling one-point victory over the Cronulla-Sutherland Sharks; however, the rest of the season produced a lot of disappointment for the team's fans. Following their first-round victory, the side lost five games straight. A mid-season revival followed, though, which saw them notch seven straight victories to move into the top four. This run included a 40–0 win over the Canberra Raiders. A string of poor performances in the back end of the season followed, though, including a 44–22 loss to the Roosters and a 26–6 loss to the Melbourne Storm in the last two rounds, which saw them lose eight out of their last 11 games and put them out of finals contention.

With 11 wins and 13 losses, the Tigers' season came to an end with them in 10th place out in the 16-team competition. Despite the result, the Tigers performed well in small areas of the game, which showed in terms of the team's overall statistics at the end of the season. The error count was one area where they performed well, being ranked second in the league. They also performed strongly in terms of tries, scoring 89; only six teams scored more. They lacked penetration, however, ranking close to the bottom in the league in terms of line breaks, tackle busts, off loads and metres gained. Defence was also a problem, with the Tigers conceding 45 points more than they scored. The failure of the club's new signings to perform as expected hurt the Tigers, while injuries to several key players, including Robbie Farah and Lote Tuqiri, compounded their situation. Benji Marshall stood in as captain in Farah's absence, and was the team's top scorer, with 167 points, which was fifth overall in the competition. Aaron Woods, who played all 24 games of the season, was named the club's Player of the Year.
