= 2011 Newcastle Knights season =

- NRL Rank: 8th
- Play-off result: Elimination Finalists (Week 1)
- 2011 record: Wins: 12; draws: 0; losses: 12
- Points scored: For: 478; against: 443

Team information
- CEO: Steve Burraston, Matthew Gidley
- Coach: Rick Stone
- Captain: Kurt Gidley
- Stadium: Hunter Stadium
- Avg. attendance: 19,186
- High attendance: 30,729

Top scorers
- Tries: Akuila Uate (20)
- Goals: Kurt Gidley (55)
- Points: Kurt Gidley (130)
| ← 2010 | 2012 → |

The 2011 Newcastle Knights season was the 24th in the club's history. Coached by Rick Stone and captained by Kurt Gidley, they competed in the NRL's 2011 Telstra Premiership. The Knights finished the regular season in 8th place (out of 16), thus reaching the finals but were knocked out after losing to the Melbourne Storm in week 1.

== Milestones ==
- Round 1: Neville Costigan made his debut for the club, after previously playing for the St. George Illawarra Dragons.
- Round 1: Beau Henry made his NRL debut for the club and scored his 1st career try.
- Round 6: Tyrone Roberts made his NRL debut for the club.
- Round 6: Steve Southern made his debut for the club, after previously playing for the North Queensland Cowboys.
- Round 10: Marvin Filipo made his NRL debut for the club.
- Round 11: Peter Mata'utia made his NRL debut for the club and scored his 1st career try.
- Round 13: Neville Costigan scored his 1st try for the club.
- Round 13: Antonio Kaufusi scored his 1st try for the club.
- Round 15: Ryan Stig made his NRL debut for the club.
- Round 16: Wes Naiqama captained his 1st game for the club.
- Round 17: Ryan Stig scored his 1st career try.
- Round 19: Ryan Stig kicked his 1st career goal.
- Round 20: Zane Tetevano made his NRL debut for the club.
- Round 25: Siuatonga Likiliki made his debut for the club, after previously playing for the New Zealand Warriors.
- Round 25: Zane Tetevano scored his 1st career try.
- Round 26: Adam MacDougall kicked his 1st career goal.
- Round 26: Akuila Uate scored 4 tries, equalling Darren Albert, Adam MacDougall, Andrew Johns and Cooper Vuna's record of most tries scored in a match by 1 player for the Knights.

== Squad ==
Newcastle Knights
| 2011 NRL premiership squad | | | Extended squad players | Coaching staff |
|---|---|---|---|---|
| 102 Adam MacDougall – CE (gk); 143 Kurt Gidley (c) – FB, FE, HB (gk); 167 Daniel Tolar – PR; 179 Jarrod Mullen (vc) – HB; 186 James McManus – WG; 189 Cory Paterson – SR (mid-season loss); 191 Mark Taufua – PR; 193 Marvin Karawana – LK; 198 Zeb Taia – SR; 200 Richard Fa'aoso – PR; 201 Matt Hilder – HK, LK; 202 Chris Houston – SR, LK; 203 Wes Naiqama (vc) – CE, FB (gk) | 205 Cameron Ciraldo – LK, SR, PR; 206 Keith Lulia – CE, SR; 208 Junior Sa'u – CE; 209 Akuila Uate – WG; 210 Isaac De Gois – HK; 211 Ben Rogers – FE, HK; 214 Shannon McDonnell – FB; 215 Constantine Mika – SR, LK; 217 Evarn Tuimavave – PR; 218 Joel Edwards – LK, SR; 219 Antonio Kaufusi – PR; 220 Kevin Naiqama – WG; 221 Neville Costigan – SR | 222 Beau Henry – FE (mid-season loss); 223 Tyrone Roberts – FE, HB, FB; 224 Steve Southern – LK; 225 Marvin Filipo – SR, CE; 226 Peter Mata'utia – WG, FB; 227 Ryan Stig – FE, HB (gk); 228 Zane Tetevano – PR, SR; 229 Siuatonga Likiliki – CE; 000 Kyle O'Donnell – SR | Chris Adams – HK; Josh Ailaomai – PR; Ethan Cook – LK; Api Pewhairangi – CE; Chad Redman – HK; Mitch Williams – WG; Simon Williams – CE | Head coach: Rick Stone; Assistant coaches: Andrew Dunemann; Craig Sandercock; Rip Taylor - NSW Cup coach; Garth Brennan - NYC coach; Legend: (c) Captain(s); (vc) Vice-captain(s); Updated: 31 December 2011; Source(s): Newcastle Knights Profiles, Rugby League Project |

== Transfers and Re-signings ==
=== Gains ===
| Player/Coach | Previous club | Length |
|---|---|---|
| Chris Adams | Cessnock Goannas | 2011 |
| Neville Costigan | St. George Illawarra Dragons | 2013 |
| Beau Henry | St. George Illawarra Dragons | 2013 |
| Chris Houston | Free agent | 2012 |
| Siuatonga Likiliki | New Zealand Warriors | 2012 |
| Kyle O'Donnell | Cronulla-Sutherland Sharks | 2012 |
| Steve Southern | North Queensland Cowboys | 2011 |
| Ryan Stig | Northern Pride RLFC | 2011 |

=== Losses ===
| Player/Coach | Club |
|---|---|
| Daniel Abraham | Kurri Kurri Bulldogs |
| Ben Cross | Leeds Rhinos |
| Scott Dureau | Catalans Dragons |
| Jimmy Fawcett | Umina Bunnies |
| Byron Fruean | Sydney Roosters |
| George Ndaira | Wests Tigers |
| Steve Simpson | Retirement |
| Sione Tovo | Wests Tigers |
| Cooper Vuna | Melbourne Rebels |

=== Promoted juniors ===
| Player | Junior side |
|---|---|
| Ethan Cook | Knights National Youth Competition |
| Api Pewhairangi | Knights National Youth Competition |
| Chad Redman | Knights National Youth Competition |
| Mitch Williams | Knights National Youth Competition |

=== Re-signings ===
| Player/Coach | Re-signed to |
|---|---|
| Chris Adams | 2012 |
| Ethan Cook | 2012 |
| Marvin Filipo | 2012 |
| Kurt Gidley | 2015 |
| Matt Hilder | 2013 |
| Peter Mata'utia | 2013 |
| Kevin Naiqama | 2012 |
| Wes Naiqama | 2014 |
| Api Pewhairangi | 2012 |
| Chad Redman | 2012 |
| Tyrone Roberts | 2012 |
| Junior Sa'u | 2013 |
| Ryan Stig | 2013 |
| Zane Tetevano | 2013 |
| Evarn Tuimavave | 2012 |

=== Player contract situations ===
| 2011 (left) | 2012 | 2013 | 2014 | 2015 |
|---|---|---|---|---|
| Josh Ailaomai | Chris Adams | Neville Costigan | Jarrod Mullen | Kurt Gidley |
| Cameron Ciraldo | Ethan Cook | Matt Hilder | Wes Naiqama | |
| Isaac De Gois | Joel Edwards | Peter Mata'utia | | |
| Beau Henry | Richard Fa'aoso | James McManus | | |
| Marvin Karawana | Marvin Filipo | Junior Sa'u | | |
| Antonio Kaufusi | Chris Houston | Ryan Stig | | |
| Keith Lulia | Siuatonga Likiliki | Zane Tetevano | | |
| Adam MacDougall | Kevin Naiqama | Akuila Uate | | |
| Shannon McDonnell | Kyle O'Donnell | | | |
| Constantine Mika | Api Pewhairangi | | | |
| Cory Paterson | Chad Redman | | | |
| Ben Rogers | Tyrone Roberts | | | |
| Steve Southern | Zeb Taia | | | |
| Mark Taufua | Evarn Tuimavave | | | |
| Daniel Tolar | | | | |
| Mitch Williams | | | | |
| Simon Williams | | | | |

== Ladder ==
2011 NRL Telstra Premiership
| Pos. | Team | Pld | W | D | L | B | PF | PA | PD | Pts |
|---|---|---|---|---|---|---|---|---|---|---|
| 1 | Melbourne Storm | 24 | 19 | 0 | 5 | 2 | 521 | 308 | 213 | 42 |
| 2 | Manly Warringah Sea Eagles (P) | 24 | 18 | 0 | 6 | 2 | 539 | 331 | 208 | 40 |
| 3 | Brisbane Broncos | 24 | 18 | 0 | 6 | 2 | 511 | 372 | 139 | 40 |
| 4 | Wests Tigers | 24 | 15 | 0 | 9 | 2 | 519 | 430 | 89 | 34 |
| 5 | St. George Illawarra Dragons | 24 | 14 | 1 | 9 | 2 | 483 | 341 | 142 | 33 |
| 6 | New Zealand Warriors | 24 | 14 | 0 | 10 | 2 | 504 | 393 | 111 | 32 |
| 7 | North Queensland Cowboys | 24 | 14 | 0 | 10 | 2 | 532 | 480 | 52 | 32 |
| 8 | Newcastle Knights | 24 | 12 | 0 | 12 | 2 | 478 | 443 | 35 | 28 |
| 9 | Canterbury-Bankstown Bulldogs | 24 | 12 | 0 | 12 | 2 | 449 | 489 | -40 | 28 |
| 10 | South Sydney Rabbitohs | 24 | 11 | 0 | 13 | 2 | 531 | 562 | -31 | 26 |
| 11 | Sydney Roosters | 24 | 10 | 0 | 14 | 2 | 417 | 500 | -83 | 24 |
| 12 | Penrith Panthers | 24 | 9 | 0 | 15 | 2 | 430 | 517 | -87 | 22 |
| 13 | Cronulla-Sutherland Sharks | 24 | 7 | 0 | 17 | 2 | 428 | 557 | -129 | 18 |
| 14 | Parramatta Eels | 24 | 6 | 1 | 17 | 2 | 385 | 538 | -153 | 17 |
| 15 | Canberra Raiders | 24 | 6 | 0 | 18 | 2 | 423 | 623 | -200 | 16 |
| 16 | Gold Coast Titans | 24 | 6 | 0 | 18 | 2 | 363 | 629 | -266 | 16 |

== Jerseys and sponsors ==
In 2011, the Knights' jerseys were made by XBlades and their major sponsor was Coal & Allied.

| 2011 Home Jersey | 2011 Away Jersey | 2011 Close the Gap Jersey | 2011 Heritage Jersey |

== Fixtures ==
=== Pre-season trials ===
| Date | Round | Opponent | Venue | Score | Tries | Goals | Attendance |
|---|---|---|---|---|---|---|---|
| Saturday, 5 February | Trial 1 | New Zealand Warriors | Wingham Park | 22 – 22 | J.Edwards, C.Houston, C.Adams, S.Williams | P.Mata'utia (3/4) | |
| Sunday, 13 February | Trial 2 | Fiji Bati | EnergyAustralia Stadium | 72 – 0 | P.Mata'utia (2), J.Ailaomai (2), K.Lulia, B.Henry, E.Cook, Z.Tetevano, S.Williams, C.Adams, K.Naiqama, W.Naiqama, S.Likiliki, A.Pewhairangi | W.Naiqama (3), P.Mata'utia (3), B.Henry (2) | 2000 |
| Saturday, 19 February | Trial 3 | Penrith Panthers | Regional Stadium, Port Macquarie | 22 – 28 | M.Karawana, E.Tuimavave, I.De Gois, M.Taufua | W.Naiqama (2), C.Paterson (1) | |
| Saturday, 26 February | Trial 4 | Cronulla-Sutherland Sharks | Olympic Park, Muswellbrook | 32 – 10 | J.Sa'u (2), I.De Gois (2), A.Uate, S.McDonnell | K.Gidley (3), W.Naiqama (1) | |
Legend: Win Loss Draw

=== Regular season ===
2011 Regular season fixtures

== Statistics ==
| Name | Appearances | Tries | Goals | Field goals | Points | Captain | Age |
|---|---|---|---|---|---|---|---|
| Cameron Ciraldo | 14 | 1 | 0 | 0 | 4 | 0 | 27 |
| Neville Costigan | 15 | 3 | 0 | 0 | 12 | 0 | 26 |
| Isaac De Gois | 17 | 1 | 0 | 0 | 4 | 0 | 27 |
| Joel Edwards | 22 | 0 | 0 | 0 | 0 | 0 | 23 |
| Richard Fa'aoso | 22 | 2 | 0 | 0 | 8 | 0 | 27 |
| Marvin Filipo | 2 | 0 | 0 | 0 | 0 | 0 | 24 |
| Kurt Gidley | 18 | 5 | 55 | 0 | 130 | 18 | 29 |
| Beau Henry | 6 | 2 | 0 | 0 | 8 | 0 | 21 |
| Matt Hilder | 21 | 4 | 0 | 0 | 16 | 0 | 29 |
| Chris Houston | 25 | 3 | 0 | 0 | 12 | 0 | 26 |
| Marvin Karawana | 6 | 0 | 0 | 0 | 0 | 0 | 25 |
| Antonio Kaufusi | 24 | 2 | 0 | 0 | 8 | 0 | 27 |
| Siuatonga Likiliki | 2 | 0 | 0 | 0 | 0 | 0 | 21 |
| Keith Lulia | 13 | 2 | 0 | 0 | 8 | 0 | 24 |
| Adam MacDougall | 9 | 4 | 1 | 0 | 18 | 0 | 36 |
| Peter Mata'utia | 5 | 2 | 0 | 0 | 8 | 0 | 21 |
| Shannon McDonnell | 7 | 4 | 0 | 0 | 16 | 0 | 24 |
| James McManus | 23 | 10 | 0 | 0 | 40 | 0 | 25 |
| Constantine Mika | 2 | 0 | 0 | 0 | 0 | 0 | 22 |
| Jarrod Mullen | 21 | 2 | 0 | 0 | 8 | 5 | 24 |
| Wes Naiqama | 17 | 4 | 21 | 0 | 58 | 2 | 29 |
| Cory Paterson | 7 | 3 | 0 | 0 | 12 | 0 | 24 |
| Tyrone Roberts | 7 | 0 | 0 | 0 | 0 | 0 | 20 |
| Ben Rogers | 2 | 0 | 0 | 0 | 0 | 0 | 26 |
| Junior Sa'u | 21 | 4 | 0 | 0 | 16 | 0 | 24 |
| Steve Southern | 7 | 0 | 0 | 0 | 0 | 0 | 29 |
| Ryan Stig | 13 | 1 | 2 | 0 | 8 | 0 | 22 |
| Zeb Taia | 5 | 2 | 0 | 0 | 8 | 0 | 27 |
| Mark Taufua | 10 | 0 | 0 | 0 | 0 | 0 | 30 |
| Zane Tetevano | 5 | 1 | 0 | 0 | 4 | 0 | 21 |
| Daniel Tolar | 14 | 0 | 0 | 0 | 0 | 0 | 29 |
| Evarn Tuimavave | 20 | 0 | 0 | 0 | 0 | 0 | 27 |
| Akuila Uate | 23 | 20 | 0 | 0 | 80 | 0 | 24 |
| Totals | 25 | 82 | 79 | 0 | 486 | - | Average: 25 |

33 players used.

== Representative honours ==
The following players appeared in a representative match in 2011.

Australia

- Akuila Uate

Cook Islands

- Keith Lulia
- Zeb Taia
- Zane Tetevano

Indigenous All Stars

- Cory Paterson

Italy

- Cameron Ciraldo

Junior Kangaroos

- Tyrone Roberts (18th man)

New South Wales

- Kurt Gidley (captain)
- Akuila Uate

New South Wales Country

- Chris Houston
- Jarrod Mullen
- Akuila Uate

New South Wales Residents

- Constantine Mika
- Rip Taylor (assistant coach)

New South Wales under-18s

- Pat Mata'utia
- Ben Roose
- Tom Rouse
- Michael Steele

NRL All Stars

- Kurt Gidley
- Akuila Uate

Queensland under-18s

- Kurt Mann

Tonga

- Richard Fa'aoso

== Individual honours ==
=== Dally M awards ===
Dally M Winger of the Year

- Akuila Uate

=== Newcastle Knights awards ===
==== Player of the Year ====
- National Youth Competition (NYC) Player of the Year: Sam Anderson

==== Players' Player ====
- National Youth Competition (NYC) Players' Player: Sam Anderson
