= 2012 Newcastle Knights season =

- NRL Rank: 12th
- 2012 record: Wins: 10; draws: 0; losses: 14
- Points scored: For: 448; against: 488

Team information
- CEO: Matthew Gidley
- Coach: Wayne Bennett
- Captain: Kurt Gidley
- Stadium: Hunter Stadium
- Avg. attendance: 20,919
- High attendance: 29,482

Top scorers
- Tries: Akuila Uate (18)
- Goals: Tyrone Roberts (40)
- Points: Tyrone Roberts (92)
← 2011	2013 →

The 2012 Newcastle Knights season was the 25th in the club's history. Coached by Wayne Bennett and captained by Kurt Gidley, they competed in the NRL's 2012 Telstra Premiership, finishing the regular season 12th (out of 16).

== Milestones ==
- Round 1: Darius Boyd made his debut for the club, after previously playing for the St. George Illawarra Dragons.
- Round 1: Adam Cuthbertson made his debut for the club, after previously playing for the St. George Illawarra Dragons.
- Round 1: Alex McKinnon made his debut for the club, after previously playing for the St. George Illawarra Dragons.
- Round 3: Matt Hilder kicked his 1st goal for the club.
- Round 4: Alex McKinnon scored his 1st try for the club.
- Round 4: Timana Tahu played his 100th game for the club.
- Round 6: Tyrone Roberts kicked his 1st career goal.
- Round 8: Kurt Gidley scored his 1000th point for the club, which was also his 1000th career point.
- Round 8: Willie Mason made his debut for the club, after previously playing for RC Toulonnais.
- Round 10: Chris Adams made his NRL debut for the club.
- Round 10: James McManus played his 100th game for the club, which was also his 100th career game.
- Round 12: Tyrone Roberts scored his 1st career try.
- Round 13: Chris Houston played his 100th career game.
- Round 14: Dane Gagai made his debut for the club, after previously playing for the Brisbane Broncos and scored his 1st try for the club.
- Round 14: Willie Mason scored his 1st try for the club.
- Round 17: Kevin Naiqama scored his 1st career try.
- Round 18: Kyle O'Donnell made his NRL debut for the club.
- Round 19: Robbie Rochow made his debut for the club, after previously playing for the Melbourne Storm.
- Round 19: Zeb Taia played his 100th career game.
- Round 21: Darius Boyd scored his 1st try for the club.
- Round 21: Robbie Rochow scored his 1st career try.
- Round 25: Timana Tahu scored his 88th try for the club, breaking Adam MacDougall's record of 87 tries as the highest ever try-scorer for the Knights.
- Round 25: Zeb Taia played his 100th game for the club.
- Round 26: Neville Costigan played his 150th career game.

== Squad ==
Newcastle Knights
2012 NRL premiership squad			Extended squad players	Coaching staff
103 Danny Buderus (vc) – HK; 128 Timana Tahu – CE; 143 Kurt Gidley (c) – FE, HB (gk); 172 Kade Snowden – PR; 179 Jarrod Mullen – FE, HB; 186 James McManus – WG; 198 Zeb Taia – SR, PR; 200 Richard Fa'aoso – PR (mid-season loss); 201 Matt Hilder – HK, FE (gk); 202 Chris Houston (vc) – SR; 203 Wes Naiqama – CE (gk); 208 Junior Sa'u – CE; 209 Akuila Uate – WG	217 Evarn Tuimavave – PR; 218 Joel Edwards – SR, LK; 220 Kevin Naiqama – WG, FB; 221 Neville Costigan – LK, HK; 223 Tyrone Roberts – HB, FB (gk); 225 Marvin Filipo – LK; 226 Peter Mata'utia – FB; 227 Ryan Stig – FE, HB; 228 Zane Tetevano – PR; 229 Siuatonga Likiliki – CE; 230 Darius Boyd – FB; 231 Adam Cuthbertson – PR, LK; 232 Alex McKinnon – LK, SR, CE	233 Willie Mason – PR; 234 Chris Adams – HK; 235 Dane Gagai – CE; 236 Kyle O'Donnell – PR; 237 Robbie Rochow – PR, SR; 000 Sam Anderson – PR; 000 Ethan Cook – LK; 000 Rodney Mason – PR; 000 Warren Schillings – LK; 000 Korbin Sims – PR; 000 Mark Wade – SR (mid-season loss)	Adrian Davis – HB; Albert Kelly – FE (mid-season termination); Daine Laurie – PR; Lorenzo Ma'afu – SR (mid-season loss); Chanel Mata'utia – WG; Maipele Morseau – FB; Tyler Randell – LK; Chad Redman – HK; Simione Sawene – PR; Will Smith – FE; Watisoni Votu – WG (pre-season loss)	Head coach: Wayne Bennett; Assistant coaches: Rick Stone; Rip Taylor - NSW Cup coach; Mick Crawley - NYC coach; Legend: (c) Captain(s); (vc) Vice-captain(s); (gk) Goal kicker; Updated: 31 December 2012; Source(s): Newcastle Knights Profile, Rugby League Project

== Transfers and Re-signings ==
=== Gains ===
Player/Coach	Previous club	Length
Wayne Bennett (head coach)	St. George Illawarra Dragons	2015
Darius Boyd	St. George Illawarra Dragons	2015
Danny Buderus	Leeds Rhinos	2012
Mick Crawley (assistant coach & NYC coach)	North Queensland Cowboys	2014
Adam Cuthbertson	St. George Illawarra Dragons	2014
Dane Gagai	Brisbane Broncos	2014
Albert Kelly	Cronulla-Sutherland Sharks	2012
Daine Laurie	Macquarie Scorpions	2012
Lorenzo Ma'afu	Ipswich Jets	Train and trial
Willie Mason	RC Toulonnais	2012
Alex McKinnon	St. George Illawarra Dragons	2014
Robbie Rochow	Melbourne Storm	2012
Simione Sawene	Fiji under-20s Rugby Union team	2012
Kade Snowden	Cronulla-Sutherland Sharks	2015
Timana Tahu	Penrith Panthers	2013
Watisoni Votu	Vuda Blues	Train and trial
Mark Wade	Merewether Carlton Rugby Club	2012

=== Losses ===
Player/Coach	Club
Josh Ailaomai	Sydney Roosters
Garth Brennan (NYC coach)	Penrith Panthers
Cameron Ciraldo	Penrith Panthers
Isaac De Gois	Cronulla-Sutherland Sharks
Andrew Dunemann (assistant coach)	Canberra Raiders
Beau Henry	Gold Coast Titans
Marvin Karawana	Hawke's Bay Rugby Union
Antonio Kaufusi	London Broncos
Keith Lulia	Bradford Bulls
Adam MacDougall	Retirement
Shannon McDonnell	Hull Kingston Rovers
Constantine Mika	Hull Kingston Rovers
Cory Paterson	North Queensland Cowboys
Ben Rogers	Retirement
Craig Sandercock (assistant coach)	Hull Kingston Rovers
Steve Southern	Wakefield Trinity Wildcats
Mark Taufua	Cronulla-Sutherland Sharks
Daniel Tolar	Retirement
Mitch Williams	Released
Simon Williams	Western Suburbs Rosellas

=== Promoted juniors ===
Player	Junior side
Sam Anderson	Knights National Youth Competition
Adrian Davis	Knights New South Wales Cup
Rodney Mason	Knights National Youth Competition
Chanel Mata'utia	Knights National Youth Competition
Maipele Morseau	Knights National Youth Competition
Tyler Randell	Knights National Youth Competition
Warren Schillings	Central Coast Centurions
Korbin Sims	Knights National Youth Competition
Will Smith	Knights National Youth Competition

=== Change of role ===
Player/Coach	New role
Api Pewhairangi	Knights second-tier squad
Rick Stone (head coach)	Knights assistant coach

=== Re-signings ===
Player/Coach	Re-signed to
Chris Adams	2013
Danny Buderus	2013
Adrian Davis	2013
Marvin Filipo	2013
Chris Houston	2014
Siuatonga Likiliki	2013
Rodney Mason	2013
Willie Mason	2014
Chanel Mata'utia	2013
Kevin Naiqama	2013
Tyler Randell	2015
Chad Redman	2013
Tyrone Roberts	2014
Robbie Rochow	2014
Korbin Sims	2013
Will Smith	2013

=== Player contract situations ===
2012 (left)	2013	2014	2015
Sam Anderson	Chris Adams	Adam Cuthbertson	Darius Boyd
Ethan Cook	Danny Buderus	Dane Gagai	Kurt Gidley
Joel Edwards	Neville Costigan	Chris Houston	Tyler Randell
Richard Fa'aoso	Adrian Davis	Willie Mason	Kade Snowden
Albert Kelly	Marvin Filipo	Alex McKinnon	
Daine Laurie	Matt Hilder	Jarrod Mullen	
Lorenzo Ma'afu	Siuatonga Likiliki	Tyrone Roberts	
Maipele Morseau	Rodney Mason	Robbie Rochow	
Wes Naiqama	Chanel Mata'utia		
Kyle O'Donnell	Peter Mata'utia		
Junior Sa'u	James McManus		
Simione Sawene	Kevin Naiqama		
Warren Schillings	Chad Redman		
Zeb Taia	Korbin Sims		
Evarn Tuimavave	Will Smith		
Watisoni Votu	Ryan Stig		
Mark Wade	Timana Tahu		
	Zane Tetevano		
	Akuila Uate		

== Ladder ==
2012 NRL season
Pos	Team	Pld	W	D	L	B	PF	PA	PD	Pts
1	Canterbury-Bankstown Bulldogs	24	18	0	6	2	568	369	+199	40
2	Melbourne Storm (P)	24	17	0	7	2	579	361	+218	38
3	South Sydney Rabbitohs	24	16	0	8	2	559	438	+121	36
4	Manly Warringah Sea Eagles	24	16	0	8	2	497	403	+94	36
5	North Queensland Cowboys	24	15	0	9	2	597	445	+152	34
6	Canberra Raiders	24	13	0	11	2	545	536	+9	30
7	Cronulla-Sutherland Sharks	24	12	1	11	2	445	441	+4	29
8	Brisbane Broncos	24	12	0	12	2	481	447	+34	28
9	St. George Illawarra Dragons	24	11	0	13	2	405	438	-33	26
10	Wests Tigers	24	11	0	13	2	506	551	-45	26
11	Gold Coast Titans	24	10	0	14	2	449	477	-28	24
12	Newcastle Knights	24	10	0	14	2	448	488	-40	24
13	Sydney Roosters	24	8	1	15	2	462	626	-164	21
14	New Zealand Warriors	24	8	0	16	2	497	609	-112	20
15	Penrith Panthers	24	8	0	16	2	409	575	-166	20
16	Parramatta Eels	24	6	0	18	2	431	674	-243	16

== Jerseys and sponsors ==
In 2012, the Knights' jerseys were made by ISC and their major sponsor was Hunter Ports.

2012 Home Jersey	2012 Away Jersey	2012 Heritage Jersey

== Fixtures ==
=== Pre-season trials ===
Date	Round	Opponent	Venue	Score	Tries	Goals	Attendance
Saturday, 11 February	Trial 1	Penrith Panthers	Regional Sports Centre, Port Macquarie	18 – 18	J.McManus, K.Naiqama, M.Hilder	K.Gidley (2/2), T.Roberts (1/1)	6,383
Saturday, 18 February	Trial 2	Cronulla-Sutherland Sharks	Olympic Park, Muswellbrook	22 – 18	A.Uate, J.McManus, K.Snowden, T.Tahu	K.Gidley (3/4)	
Legend: Win Loss Draw

=== Regular season ===
2012 Regular season fixtures

== Statistics ==
Name	Appearances	Tries	Goals	Field goals	Points	Captain	Age
Chris Adams	3	0	0	0	0	0	26
Darius Boyd	22	3	0	0	12	0	25
Danny Buderus	22	2	0	0	8	17	34
Neville Costigan	23	2	0	0	8	0	27
Adam Cuthbertson	22	0	0	0	0	0	27
Joel Edwards	19	0	0	0	0	0	24
Richard Fa'aoso	8	2	0	0	8	0	28
Marvin Filipo	2	0	0	0	0	0	25
Dane Gagai	12	5	0	0	20	0	21
Kurt Gidley	5	1	14	0	32	5	30
Matt Hilder	10	0	1	0	2	0	30
Chris Houston	24	4	0	0	16	2	27
Willie Mason	17	1	0	0	4	0	32
Peter Mata'utia	1	0	0	0	0	0	22
Alex McKinnon	24	2	0	0	8	0	20
James McManus	19	10	0	0	40	0	26
Jarrod Mullen	24	8	0	0	32	0	25
Kevin Naiqama	8	7	0	0	28	0	23
Wes Naiqama	6	1	9	0	22	0	30
Kyle O'Donnell	1	0	0	0	0	0	22
Tyrone Roberts	18	3	40	0	92	0	21
Robbie Rochow	8	1	0	0	4	0	22
Junior Sa'u	8	2	0	0	8	0	25
Kade Snowden	19	0	0	0	0	0	26
Timana Tahu	22	7	0	0	28	0	32
Zeb Taia	23	1	0	0	4	0	28
Zane Tetevano	13	0	0	0	0	0	22
Evarn Tuimavave	3	0	0	0	0	0	28
Akuila Uate	22	18	0	0	72	0	25
Totals	24	80	64	0	448	-	Average: 26

29 players used.

== Representative honours ==
The following players appeared in a representative match in 2012.

Australia

- Darius Boyd
- Akuila Uate

Junior Kangaroos

- Alex McKinnon (captain)
- Korbin Sims

Junior Kiwis

- Api Pewhairangi

New South Wales

- Akuila Uate

New South Wales Country

- James McManus
- Jarrod Mullen

New South Wales Residents

- Marvin Filipo
- Kyle O'Donnell

New South Wales under-16s

- Travis Edwards
- Sione Mata'utia
- Tevita Pangai Junior

New South Wales under-20s

- Chanel Mata'utia
- Alex McKinnon

NRL All Stars

- Wayne Bennett (coach)
- Kade Snowden

Prime Minister's XIII

- Darius Boyd
- Akuila Uate

Queensland

- Darius Boyd

Queensland under-20s

- Kurt Mann

== Individual honours ==
=== Teams and squads ===
National Youth Competition (NYC) Team of the Year

- Korbin Sims

New South Wales Cup Team of the Year

- Marvin Filipo
- Siuatonga Likiliki
- Josh Mantellato
- Rip Taylor (coach)

=== Dally M awards ===
Dally M Winger of the Year

- Akuila Uate

=== Newcastle Knights awards ===
==== Player of the Year ====
- National Rugby League (NRL) Player of the Year: Chris Houston
- National Youth Competition (NYC) Player of the Year: Adam Clydsdale

==== Players' Player ====
- National Rugby League (NRL) Players' Player: Danny Buderus
- National Youth Competition (NYC) Players' Player: Adam Clydsdale
