= Central Coast Roosters =

Australian rugby league club, based in Central Coast, NSW

Club information
- Full name: Central Coast Roosters
- Nickname: Roosters
- Short name: Central Coast
- Colours: Blue; Red; White
- Founded: 2005; 21 years ago

Current details
- Ground: Morrie Breen Oval
- Competition: NSWRL Women's Premiership, S. G. Ball Cup and Harold Matthews Cup

Records
- Premierships: 2 (1980 Harold Matthews Cup, 2020 Women's)
- Runners-up: 1 (1984 Harold Matthews Cup)
- Minor premierships: 1 (2020 Women's)

The Central Coast Roosters, formerly Central Coast Centurions, are an Australian rugby league football club (previously known as the Rip or Storm) based in the Central Coast region in New South Wales. They competed in the New South Wales Cup which they exited in 2011. The club still competes in the NSWRL Women's Premiership, S. G. Ball Cup and Harold Matthews Cup competitions.

== History ==
=== Rip (2005-2006) ===
The club was founded as the Central Coast Rip in 2005 and competed in the S. G. Ball Cup, Harold Matthews Cup and Jersey Flegg Cup. The players were a mix of talent from the local Central Coast Division of Country Rugby League - Group 12 Competition. At the end of the 2006 season and without a finals appearance in any of the competitions the Rip entered, the club was bought out by the Melbourne Storm who turned the Central Coast-based club into their main feeder team.

=== Storm (2007-2009) ===
In 2007 the Central Coast Storm, now a packed side with both local and interstate talent (courtesy of the Melbourne Storm's Victorian based junior's program), began to run a side in the New South Wales Cup, acting as the Storm's feeder club. Along with the new and major support from the Storm, the team received sponsorship from the private health company, Medibank Private for the next three seasons. Part of this sponsorship included more sponsorship of the actual local district competitions.

The team's first season in the New South Wales Cup in 2008 ended unsuccessfully, they did not reach the finals and finished in a disappointing 10th place. The team however was able to reveal some notable talent for the Melbourne Storm including promising prop Aiden Tolman, who later graduated to the first team towards the end of the 2008 season. Future first-graders for the Storm who grew their talent at Central Coast included Sinbad Kali, Kevin Proctor and Matt Duffie with the later two contributing to Melbourne Storm's clinching of the 2009 Toyota National Youth Competition.

The 2009 season would end up being the final season for the Central Coast Storm before they were to wound-up by the Melbourne Storm. Their final season however, turned out to be their most successful. Throughout the season, the team was always both consistent and also a very attacking football-team. This culminated with the Storm finishing a very credible 2nd place behind the Canterbury-Bankstown Bulldogs-feeder team, the Bankstown City Bulls. The team's first finals appearance turned out to be a shocker. The team went against the 7th-placed Western Suburbs in the first-week of the finals. A win would have seen the Central Coast Storm one win away from their first ever Grand Final appearance, however, in front of their home supporters, the team was trounced by the Magpies and by the end of the 80 minutes, the scoreline read an astonishing 68-4 in what was the shock result of the week by far. Instead, the Storm in the Semi-Finals faced the Balmain Tigers at Leichhardt Oval in what proved to be the club's final game of their short 4-year history. The Storm attempted to trample a Tigers side who would eventually reach the Grand Final of the competition. With the side missing the likes of Kevin Proctor, Brian Lima, Ryan Tandy as well a host of other regulars, the team went in understrength, very much similar to the game against Western Suburbs and as such went down in a surprisingly tight-encounter, 24-18 with the Storm coming back in the 2nd half. The loss meant this was the Storm's final game as they were eliminated from the finals after a very successful home/away season.

With the season over, the Melbourne Storm officially announced its intentions to pull out from the Central Coast after three seasons of both success and failure at the ever-expanding region. The Storm instead released to the media that it will now instead field a side in the NSW Cup based wholly and solely in Melbourne. As such, the team will be named exactly like the first-grade team, Melbourne Storm. As a replacement to the now-defunct Storm, Greg Florimo, the CEO of the North Sydney Bears and head of the expansion consortium of the Central Coast Bears, announced their intentions to field their own side based entirely out of the Central Coast. The side was originally to be known as the Central Coast Cubs (as a reference to the ties to the Bears) but the moniker was changed to Centurions after gaining support from the Newcastle Knights.

=== Centurions (2010-2011) ===
The Centurions acted as a feeder club to the NRL club Newcastle Knights. They started the season well with a 28-18 win against the Canterbury-Bankstown Bulldogs at the Crest Sports Complex in Round 1, but then had a horror run through the middle of the season with 13 losses and 4 wins.

Some notable players in the squad are Chris Adams, Joel Edwards, Marvin Filipo, Sinbad Kali, Marvin Karawana, Siuatonga Likiliki, Keith Lulia, Peter Mata'utia, Shannon McDonnell, Constantine Mika, Kevin Naiqama, Kyle O'Donnell, Ben Rogers, Steve Southern, Ryan Stig, Zane Tetevano and Simon Williams. The Centurions coach Rip Taylor was selected to coach alongside Jason Taylor as the assistant coach of the NSW Residents on 7 July 2010 against the Queensland residents before game III of the 2010 State of Origin series at ANZ Stadium. Centurions winger Kevin Naiqama was also in the NSW team and scored the game-breaking try. NSW went on to win the game.

Centre Marvin Filipo was named the Centurions player of the year in 2010, and Steve Southern was named in 2011.

=== Demise from NSW Cup ===
During October 2011, it was announced that the Centurions would not be continuing in 2012, with the team to be named the Newcastle Knights in the NSW Cup competition from then on.

=== Club goes on (2012-current) ===
While the Central Coast Centurions exited the NSW Cup however the side continued to play in the New South Wales Rugby League's S. G. Ball Cup and Harold Matthews Cup. In this time, the Sydney Roosters developed ties with Central Coast Rugby League and the club. In 2017 the Central Coast Centurions name was officially changed to Central Coast Roosters to highlight the strength of the arrangement. The Sydney Roosters maintain their own junior development teams by the same name in both competitions.

=== NSWRL Women's Premiers (2020) ===
The Central Coast entered a representative team, as the Roosters, in the 2020 NSWRL Women's Premiership. The commencement of the competition was delayed until July, due to the COVID-19 pandemic in Australia. The team completed the seven match regular season in first place, with five wins, one draw and one bye. Remarkably, the draw came against Wentworthville Magpies who were winless wooden spooners.

The Roosters' won a place in the Grand Final by defeating Cronulla-Sutherland Sharks in the major semi-final at Campbelltown Stadium on September 12. The win was achieved with a field goal in golden-point extra-time.

In the Grand Final at Bankwest Stadium on September 27, the Roosters scored the first two tries to take a 10 to nil lead. Their opponents, the North Sydney Bears responded with a try before Central Coast countered with their third try. The score was 14-4 at the break. North Sydney scored early in the second half, and that try was converted. The Roosters managed to protect a four point lead until the last minute, when they received a penalty. The resulting goal saw the full time score: Central Coast 16, North Sydney 10.

Members of the Central Coast Roosters received the two individual awards for the competition. Hannah Southwell (lock) was named Player of the Year. Yasmin Meakes (centre) was named Player of the Match for the Grand Final. Team captain Isabelle Kelly had previously played for Central Coast Club side Berkeley Vale Panthers in the NSWRL Women's Premiership.

== Players ==
- Daniel Abraham
- Chris Adams
- Tye Alchin
- Simon Allen
- James Api
- Kori Barber
- Mitch Barnes
- Shaun Boss
- Scott Briggs
- Joel Burraston
- Cameron Ciraldo
- Dale Clacherty
- Nathan Clarke
- Chris Cole
- Matt Cooper
- Dane Cordner
- Matt Croker
- Isaac Dargan
- Adrian Davis
- Isaac De Gois
- Sean Driver
- Scott Dureau
- Nicholas Dwan
- Joel Edwards
- Teason Fa'avae-Eli
- Aaron Fairweather
- Alec Fata
- Jimmy Fawcett
- Marvin Filipo
- Byron Fruean
- Royce Geoffrey
- Harmony Hunt
- Sinbad Kali
- Marvin Karawana
- Mitch Kennedy
- Tom Lewsley
- Siuatonga Likiliki
- Keith Lulia
- Chris Marlborough
- Rodney Mason
- Peter Mata'utia
- Shannon McDonnell
- Jayson McKenzie
- Mitch McMahon
- Alex McMillan
- Constantine Mika
- Lucas Miller
- Grant Millington
- Chris Morgan
- Maipele Morseau
- Kevin Naiqama
- George Ndaira
- Kyle O'Donnell
- Api Pewhairangi
- Daniel Phillips
- Josh Phillips
- Tyler Randell
- Ben Rogers
- Warren Schillings
- Kirran Shearer
- Brendon Simpson
- Justin Smith
- Steve Southern
- Ryan Stig
- Alai Taufa'ao
- Joel Taufa'ao
- Mark Taufua
- Zane Tetevano
- Daniel Tolar
- Sione Tovo
- Jarrod Tua
- David Uhi
- Dale Verstappen
- Corey Vlaciky
- Cooper Vuna
- Trent Walker
- Mitch Williams
- Simon Williams
- Cruise Wilson
- Sam Wooden
- Ben Wrigley
- Ben Wyborn
- Matt Ikuvalu
- Ben Thomas
- Jack Coggar
- Tom Starling
