= Daniel Smailes =

Australian rugby league footballer

Personal information
- Full name: Daniel Smailes
- Born: 14 April 1976 (age 50)

Playing information
- Position: Second-row
Club
| Years | Team | Pld | T | G | FG | P |
|---|---|---|---|---|---|---|
| 1997–00 | Newcastle Knights | 21 | 1 | 0 | 0 | 4 |
- Source: As of 7 February 2019

Daniel Smailes is an Australian former professional rugby league footballer who played for the Newcastle Knights from 1997 to 2001.

Smailes played his junior rugby league for the Cessnock Goannas in the Newcastle Rugby League, before being signed by the Newcastle Knights.
