= Sinbad Kali =

Australian rugby league footballer

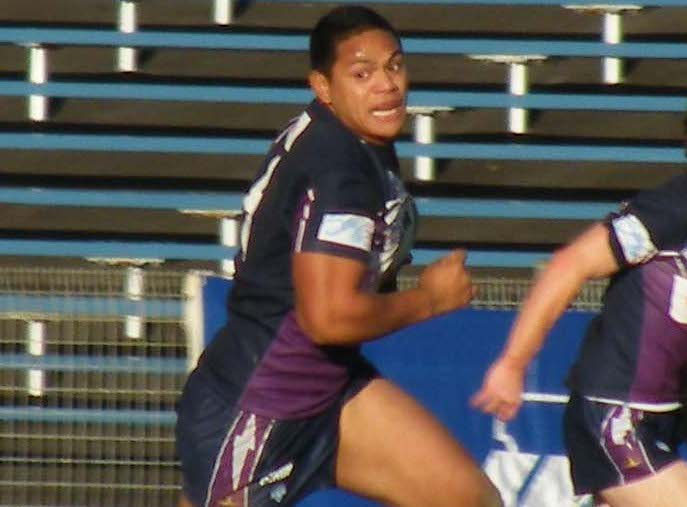

Personal information
- Full name: Sinbad Kali
- Born: 25 March 1987 (age 39) Sydney, Australia
- Height: 185 cm (6 ft 1 in)
- Weight: 112 kg (17 st 9 lb)

Playing information
- Position: Prop
Club
Years	Team	Pld	T	G	FG	P
2008	Melbourne Storm	1	0	0	0	0
- Source: RLP & NRL Stats As of 7 February 2019

Sinbad Kali born 25 March 1987 is a former professional rugby league footballer. He previously played for the Central Coast Centurions in the NSW Cup and in the NRL for the Melbourne Storm. He played as a prop.

== Playing career ==
A Wyong Roos junior, Kali made his NRL debut in round 16 of the 2008 NRL season for the Melbourne Storm against the Parramatta Eels at Parramatta Stadium. Kali played off the bench in Melbourne's 24–22 loss. While signed to the Storm, he played with their feeder club the Central Coast Storm in the 2008 NSW Cup competition, where he was named the club's best forward.

Kali was named in the Tonga training squad for the 2008 Rugby League World Cup.

Re-signed by Melbourne for 2009, he continued with the Storm until the end of the 2010 NRL season without adding appearing in another NRL match for the club.

Returning to the Central Coast in 2011, he played for the Central Coast Centurions in the NSW Cup, with the Centurions acting as the reserve grade squad for the Newcastle Knights.

Kali walked away from rugby league following the 2011 season to work in his local church, but returned to the sport during the 2012 season, joining The Entrance Tigers who were then competing in the Bundaberg Red Cup.
