= Kevin Naiqama =

Fiji international rugby league footballer

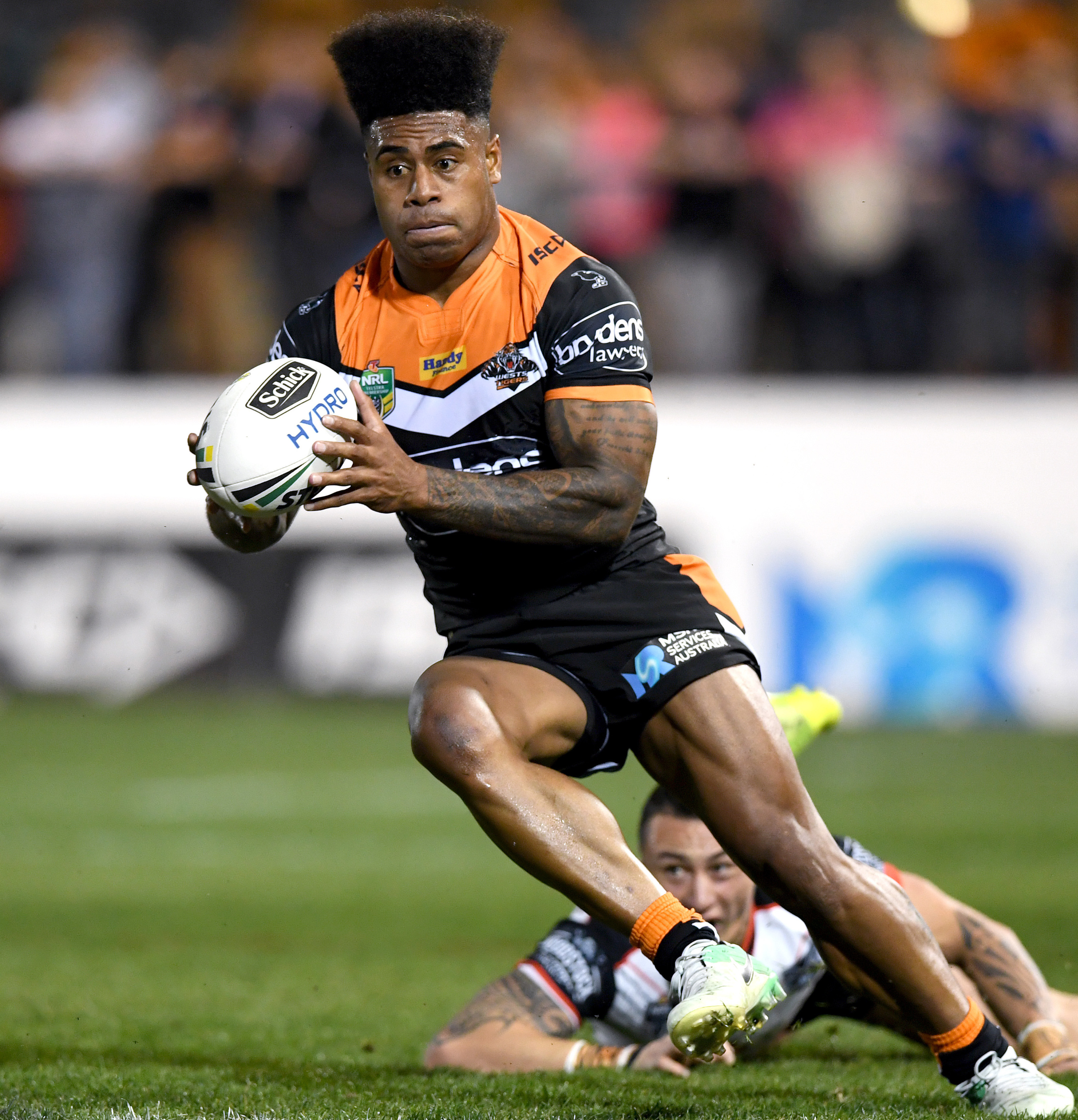

Personal information
- Full name: Kevin Ligani Naiqama
- Born: 4 February 1989 (age 37) Sutherland, New South Wales, Australia

Playing information
- Height: 177 cm (5 ft 10 in)
- Weight: 93 kg (14 st 9 lb)
- Position: Centre, Wing, Fullback
Club
Years	Team	Pld	T	G	FG	P
2010–13	Newcastle Knights	15	9	0	0	36
2014	Penrith Panthers	8	7	0	0	28
2015–18	Wests Tigers	90	35	0	0	140
2019–21	St Helens	77	39	0	0	156
2022	Sydney Roosters	7	2	0	0	8
2023–24	Huddersfield Giants	35	21	0	0	48
	Total	232	113	0	0	416
Representative
Years	Team	Pld	T	G	FG	P
2009–	Fiji	24	10	0	0	40
2010	NSW Residents	1	1	0	0	4
2019	Fiji 9s	3	1	0	0	5
- Education: Endeavour Sports High School
- Relatives: Sera Naiqama (sister); Wes Naiqama (brother)

Kevin Naiqama (born 4 February 1989) is a Fiji international former rugby league footballer who plays as a centre or winger for the Western Suburbs Rosellas in the Newcastle Rugby League and as a fullback or five-eighth for Fiji at the International level.

He previously played for the Newcastle Knights, Penrith Panthers, Wests Tigers and the Sydney Roosters in the National Rugby League (NRL), and St Helens in the Super League.

== Background ==
Naiqama was born in Sutherland, New South Wales, Australia, and is of Fijian descent.

Naiqama is the younger brother of former London Broncos player and Fijian international, Wes Naiqama.

== Playing career ==
=== Early career ===
After playing with the St. George Illawarra Dragons, Naiqama joined the Newcastle Knights alongside his brother Wes in 2008. He played for the Knights' NYC team in 2008 and 2009, scoring 21 tries in 33 games.

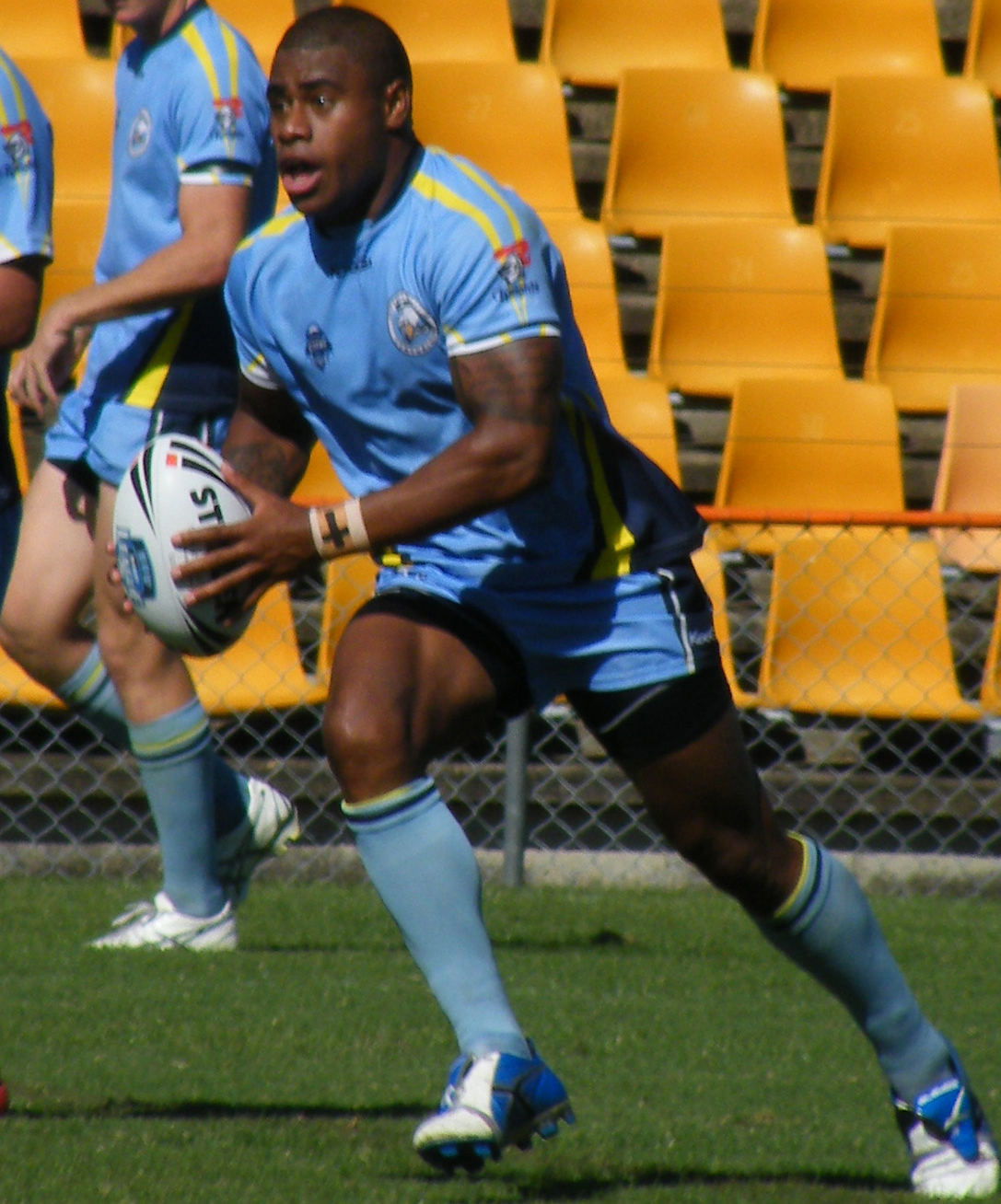
Naiqama playing for the Central Coast Centurions in 2011

=== 2009 ===
Naiqama played for Fiji in the 2009 Pacific Cup.

=== 2010 ===
Moving to the Knights' New South Wales Cup team Central Coast Centurions, Naiqama played for the New South Wales Residents against the Queensland Residents at ANZ Stadium as a curtain raiser to Game three of the State of Origin series. In Round 26, Naiqama made his NRL debut for the Knights against the Melbourne Storm on the wing in the 34–4 loss at AAMI Park. At the end of 2010, Naiqama was named on the wing in the New South Wales Cup Team of the Year.

=== 2011 ===
In June, Naiqama re-signed with the Knights on a 1-year contract, but did not make an appearance for the Knights in the 2011 season.

=== 2012 ===
On 3 August, Naiqama re-signed with the Knights on a 1-year contract. In Round 17 against the Parramatta Eels at Parramatta Stadium, he scored his first NRL try in the Knights' 20–12 win.

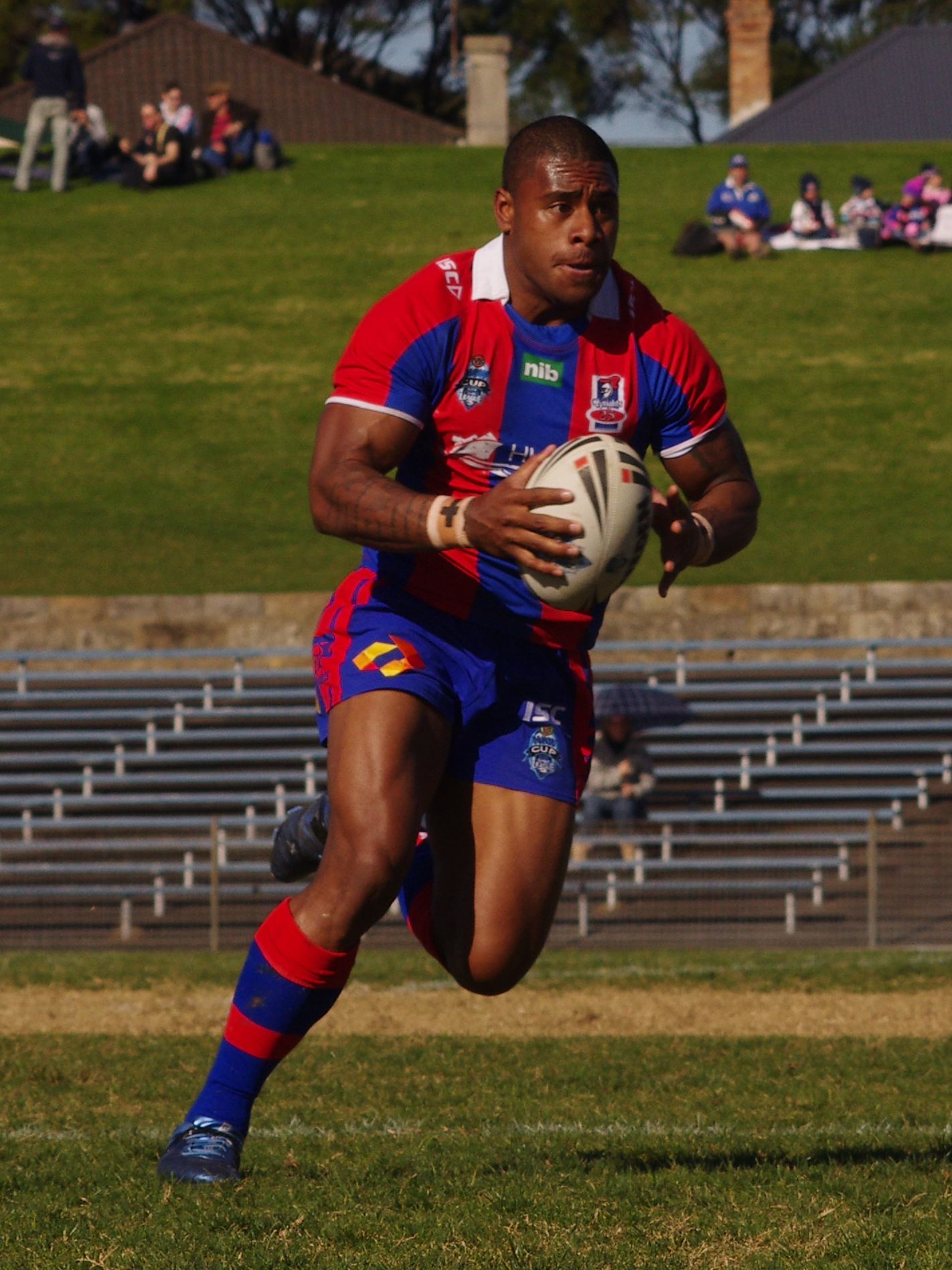
Naiqama playing for the Newcastle Knights in 2012

He finished the season with 8 matches and 7 tries.

=== 2013 ===
On 21 June, Naiqama signed a 2-year contract with the Penrith Panthers starting in 2014, to join his older brother Wes. Knights coach Wayne Bennett told Naiqama to move clubs and further his career as he was behind representative players Darius Boyd, James McManus and Akuila Uate at the Knights. He finished the 2013 season having played in 6 matches and scoring 2 tries. At the end of the season, he played for Fiji at the 2013 Rugby League World Cup, playing in 5 matches and scoring 1 try.

=== 2014 ===
In February, Naiqama played for the Panthers at the inaugural Auckland Nines. In Round 2 against the Melbourne Storm, he made his Panthers debut, scoring a double in the 18–17 loss. On 3 May, he played for Fiji in the 2014 Pacific Test, scoring a try in the 32–16 loss.

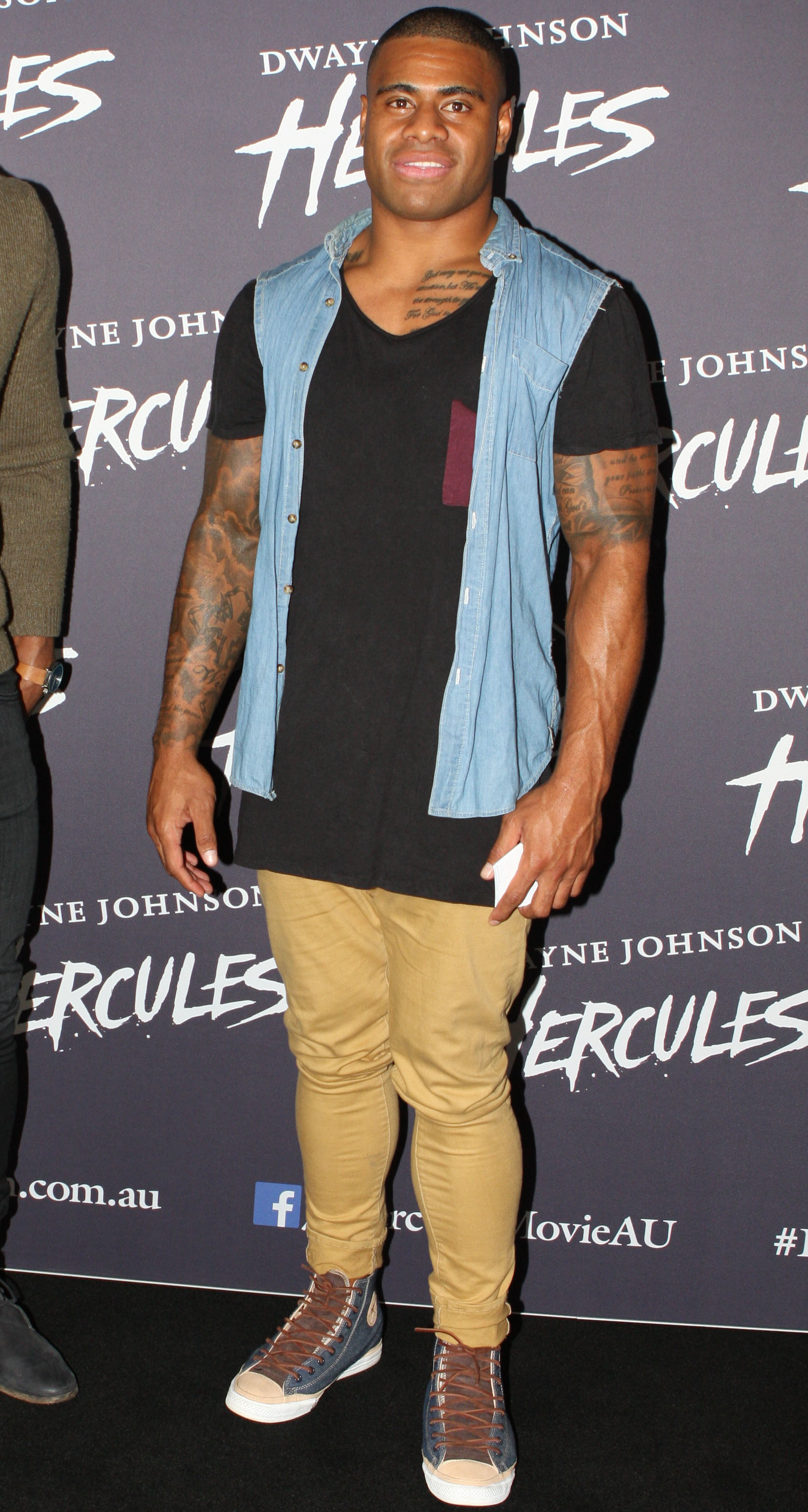
Naiqama at the premiere of Hercules in 2014

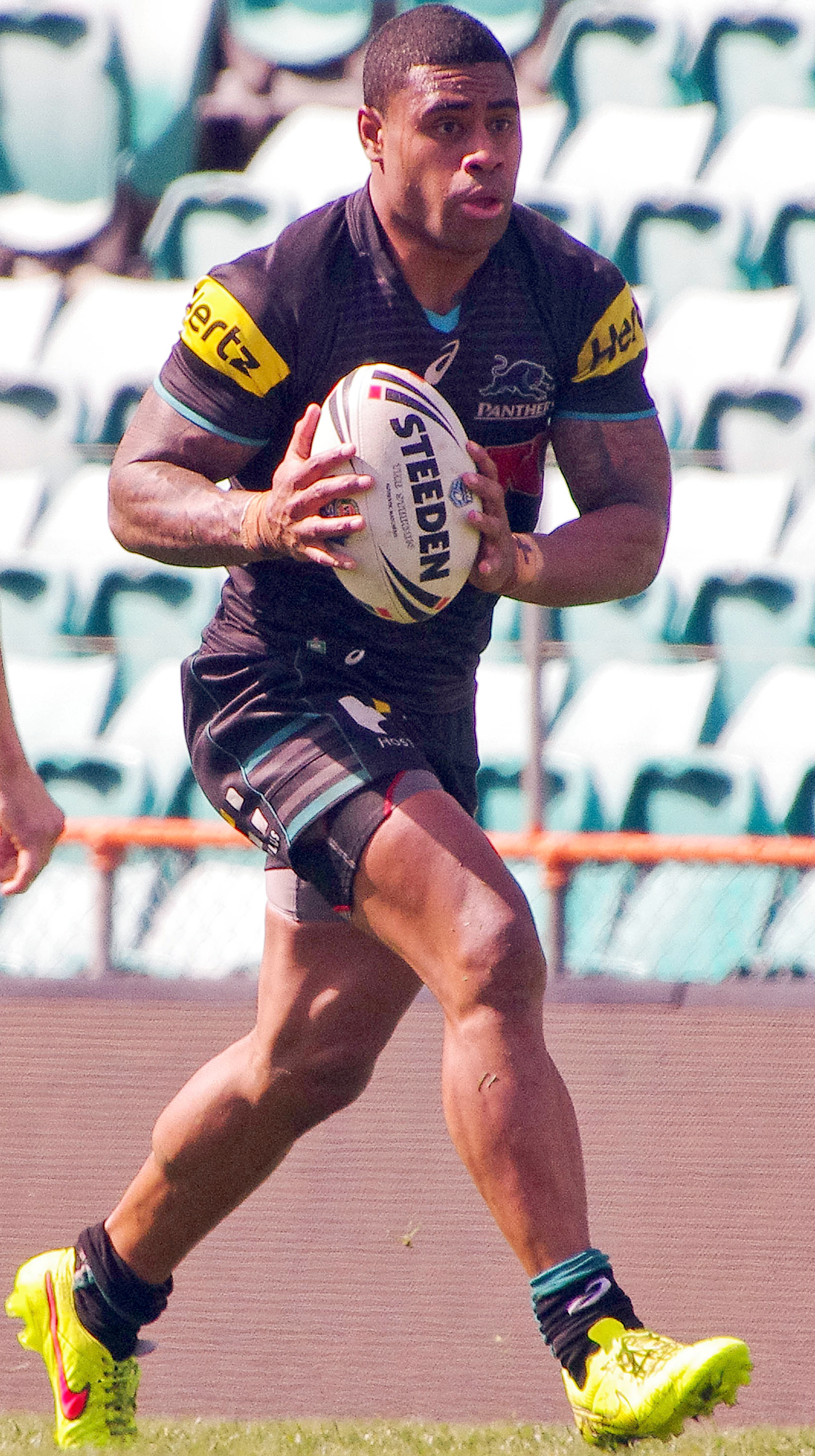
Naiqama playing for the Penrith Panthers in 2014

He finished off the NRL season with 8 matches and 7 tries. On 10 October 2014, Naiqama signed a 1-year contract with the Wests Tigers starting in 2015.

=== 2015 ===
Naiqama made his first appearance for the Wests Tigers in the Auckland Nines. After what the Sydney Morning Herald called an "impressive showing", he said, "I'm the fittest and fastest I have felt in a couple of years, having done my first full pre-season in two years." With regular winger David Nofoaluma recovering from injury, Naiqama was named in the starting side for the opening games of the season. In round 1 against the Gold Coast Titans, Naiqama made his debut for the Wests Tigers in the 19–18 loss at Robina Stadium. In Round 2 against the St George Illawarra Dragons, Naiqama scored his first try for the Tigers in the 22–4 win at Campbelltown Stadium. On 15 April 2015, Naiqama signed a two-year extension with the club.

In round 8 against the Canterbury-Bankstown Bulldogs, Naiqama did one of the best try assists of the year, when he miraculously flicked a ball, that looked go over the dead ball line, back to James Tedesco. When asked about his try assist being similar to Greg Inglis's in the 2008 ANZAC Test, Naiqama said "I think his was more acrobatic than mine. But it was just real lucky to pull it off and get the try in the end". On 2 May, Naiqama played at fullback for Fiji against Papua New Guinea in the 2015 Melanesian Cup. From Round 21 onwards, when David Nofoaluma returned from injury, Naiqama was shifted from the wing to centre. Naiqama finished his first year with the Wests Tigers with 9 tries from 24 matches.

=== 2016 ===
Naiqama was named in the Tigers Auckland Nines squad. Remaining at right centre in 2016, Naiqama scored his first treble in the Round 3 match against the Titans in the 30–18 loss at Robina Stadium. By mid-season, he was named as one of the most improved players of the year, and it was said he had, "become a genuinely dangerous player down the Tigers' right side, appearing in every game this season. His success is the result of nothing but hard work and persistence." Naiqama finished the season with 11 tries from 23 matches. On 8 October, Naiqama represented Fiji in a test against Samoa in Apia, captaining the team to a 20–18 victory.

=== 2017 ===
In February, Naiqama played in the Auckland Nines. On 6 May, Naiqama again played as captain and fullback for Fiji against Tonga in the 2017 Pacific Cup. He set up a try for Ben Nakubuwai just before half time in the thrilling match but they lost 26–24 in the dying minutes. Naiqama made 23 appearances for Wests Tigers, playing centre and wing, and covering fullback when James Tedesco was injured. At season's end, he signed an extension to stay at the club for another year. Naiqama noted he was "stoked" to be staying, and coach Ivan Cleary said, "Kevin has shown great versatility for the team this year covering a number of positions and has handled himself exceptionally well."

Playing in his second World Cup, but his first as captain of Fiji, Naiqama gained attention when he was seen crying during his team's national anthem before the first game. He scored two tries in that match against the USA, and another in the match against Italy for three tries from five games. Coach Mick Potter said of his captaincy, "The position he plays is good for him to be captain. He can boss a few people around but he also shows composure under pressure. I think that's really important. He speaks well, he speaks rugby league. He doesn't talk rubbish and he gets to the point very quickly."

=== 2018 ===
Naiqama made 20 appearances for Wests in the 2018 NRL season as the club finished in 9th place on the table and missed out on the finals.

On 22 May 2018 Naiqama signed a three-year contract with St Helens.

=== 2019 ===
After his contract ran out with the Wests Tigers, Naiqama joined English side St Helens.

He played in the 2019 Challenge Cup Final defeat by the Warrington Wolves at Wembley Stadium.

In his first season with St Helens, the club won the League Leaders Shield after finishing 16 points ahead of second placed Wigan. Naiqama then played in the 2019 Super League Grand Final against Salford which St Helens won 23–6 at Old Trafford securing the club's 14th championship.

=== 2020 ===
In the 2020 semi-final against Catalans Dragons, Naiqama scored a hat-trick in St Helens 48–2 victory at Langtree Park.

He played in the club's 8-4 2020 Super League Grand Final victory over Wigan at the Kingston Communications Stadium in Hull.

=== 2021 ===
In round 3 of the 2021 Super League season, he scored two tries for St. Helens in a 34–6 victory over Wakefield Trinity.

On 17 July, he played for St. Helens in their 26-12 2021 Challenge Cup Final victory over Castleford.

Naiqama's final game for St Helens was the 2021 Super League Grand Final where Saints won a close match 12–10 over the Catalans Dragons. Naiqama scored two tries in the final and was awarded the Harry Sunderland Trophy as man of the match. On 8 December, he joined the Sydney Roosters for the 2022 NRL season.

=== 2022 ===
In round 4 of the 2022 NRL season, he made his club debut for the Sydney Roosters scoring a try in their 28–4 victory over North Queensland. On 21 June 2022, it was reported that Naiqama would sign a two-year deal with the Huddersfield Giants. Naiqama played in all four matches at the 2021 Rugby League World Cup for Fiji including the quarter-final where he scored two tries in their controversial 24–18 loss to New Zealand.

=== 2023 ===
Naiqama played 25 matches with Huddersfield in the 2023 Super League season and scored 14 tries as the club finished ninth on the table and missed the playoffs.

=== 2024 ===
Naiqama was one of many players during the NRL Grand Final who were given a farewell to the 2024 retiring players.

== Statistics ==
Year	Team	Games	Tries	Pts
2010	Newcastle Knights	1		
2012	Newcastle Knights	8	7	28
2013	Newcastle Knights	6	2	8
2014	Penrith Panthers	8	7	28
2015	Wests Tigers	24	9	36
2016	Wests Tigers	23	11	44
2017	Wests Tigers	23	9	36
2018	Wests Tigers	20	6	24
2019	St Helens	31	20	84
2020	St Helens	21	9	36
2021	St Helens	25	10	40
2022	Sydney Roosters	7	2	8
2023	Huddersfield Giants	26	15	60
2024	Huddersfield Giants	26	11	44
	Totals	232	113	416
