= Cessnock Goannas =

Australian rugby league club, based in Cessnock, NSW

Club information
- Full name: Cessnock Goannas Rugby League Football Club
- Colours: Gold; Black
- Founded: 1911; 115 years ago

Current details
- Coach: Harry Siejka
- Captain: Harry Siejka
- Competition: Newcastle Rugby League

The Cessnock Goannas Rugby League Football Club is an Australian rugby league football club based in Cessnock, New South Wales, formed in 1911. They currently play in the Newcastle Rugby League competition

== Notable Rugby League Juniors ==
- Matthew Johns (1992-2002 Newcastle Knights, Wigan Warriors and Cronulla)
- Andrew Johns (1993-2005 Newcastle Knights)
- Bill Peden (1994-2002 Newcastle Knights)
- Daniel Smailes (1997-2001 Newcastle Knights)
- Joel Edwards (2010-12 Newcastle Knights, 2013-15 Canberra Raiders and 2016-17 Wests Tigers)
- Isaac Gordon (2010-12 Cronulla Sharks)
- Chris Adams (2012 Newcastle Knights)
- Brodie Jones (2020-current) Newcastle Knights
- Brayden Musgrove (2021 Newcastle Knights)
- Fletcher Sharpe (2024-current) Newcastle Knights
- Alex Young (2024) Sydney Roosters

== Honours ==
First Grade Premierships:1941, 1950, 1954, 1955, 1960, 1972, 1977, 2003, 2020

Reserve Grade Premierships:1934, 1951, 1952, 1954, 1957, 1958, 1964, 1977, 1978, 1980.

Third Grade Premierships: 1957

== See also ==
- List of rugby league clubs in Australia
