= Beau Henry =

Australian rugby league footballer

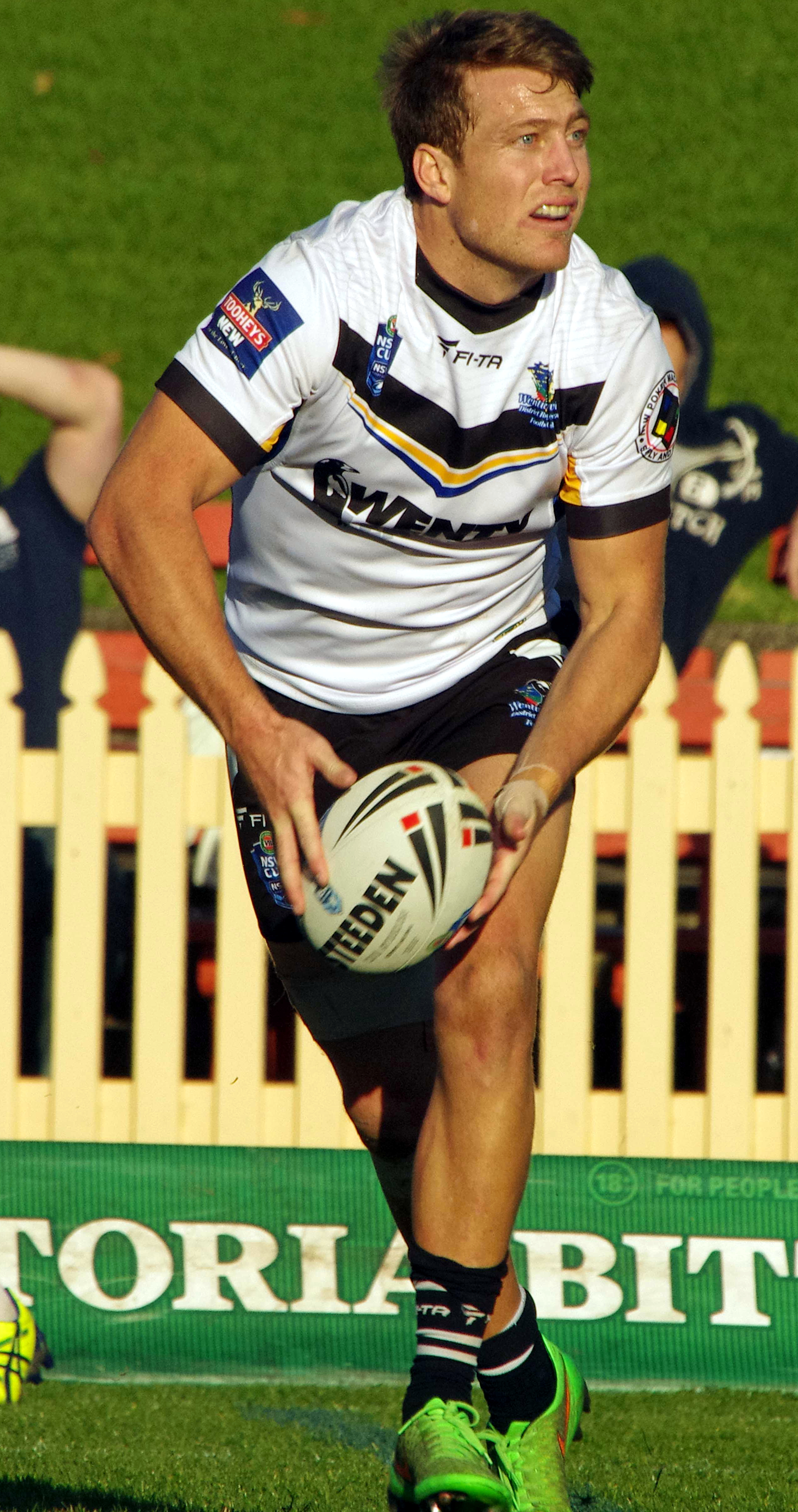
- Henry playing for the Wentworthville Magpies in 2015

Personal information
- Born: 17 January 1990 (age 36) Shellharbour, New South Wales, New South Wales, Australia
- Height: 189 cm (6 ft 2 in)
- Weight: 93 kg (14 st 9 lb)

Playing information
- Position: Halfback, Five-eighth
Club
| Years | Team | Pld | T | G | FG | P |
|---|---|---|---|---|---|---|
| 2011 | Newcastle Knights | 6 | 2 | 0 | 0 | 8 |
| 2011–14 | Gold Coast Titans | 8 | 0 | 9 | 0 | 18 |
| | Total | 14 | 2 | 9 | 0 | 26 |
- Source: As of 20 September 2014

Beau Henry (born 17 January 1990) is an Australian professional rugby league footballer who plays for the Wentworthville Magpies in the Ron Massey Cup. He formerly played for the Newcastle Knights and Gold Coast Titans in the National Rugby League. He primarily plays halfback and five-eighth.

== Background ==
Henry was born in Shellharbour, New South Wales, Australia.

He played his junior football for the Warilla Gorillas before being signed by the St. George Illawarra Dragons.

== Playing career ==
From 2008 to 2010, Henry played for the St. George Illawarra Dragons' NYC team, scoring over 400 points. At the end of 2009, Henry won the 2009 NYC Player of the Year award and was named at halfback in the 2009 NYC Team of the Year. In 2009, Henry almost signed with the North Queensland Cowboys but was convinced not to by Dragons first-grade coach, Wayne Bennett. He played on with the Dragons in 2010 without yet making his NRL debut. In June 2010, Henry signed a three-year contract with the Newcastle Knights starting in 2011.

In round 1 of the 2011 season, Henry made his NRL debut for Newcastle against the Penrith Panthers. He scored a try on debut. After the signing of Wayne Bennett to coach the Newcastle outfit in 2012, Henry was told he was unwanted for the 2012 season. He was then released mid-season in 2011 to sign a 2 1/2-year contract with the Gold Coast Titans starting effective immediately. Henry made his Gold Coast debut in round 20 of the 2011 NRL season against the North Queensland Cowboys. In 2014, Henry re-signed with the Gold Coast club on a one-year contract for the rest of the season. On 29 October 2014, Henry signed a one-year contract to return to his original club, the St. George Illawarra Dragons starting in 2015. Henry was selected by St. George Illawarra in the 2015 NRL Auckland Nines.

In March 2015, Henry was released from his St. George Illawarra contract to join the Wentworthville Magpies in the New South Wales Cup. On 10 September 2018, Henry was voted Ron Massey Cup Player of the Season. On 22 September 2018, he was part of the Wentworthville side which won the Ron Massey Cup premiership, defeating St Marys 38–4. Henry captained Wentworthville in their 2019 Ron Massey Cup grand final victory over St Mary's at Leichhardt Oval. On 5 August 2020, Henry was sent off during a game between Wentworthville and Glebe. It was alleged that Henry wiped blood from his nose on an opposition player.
