= Chris Adams (rugby league) =

Australian rugby league footballer

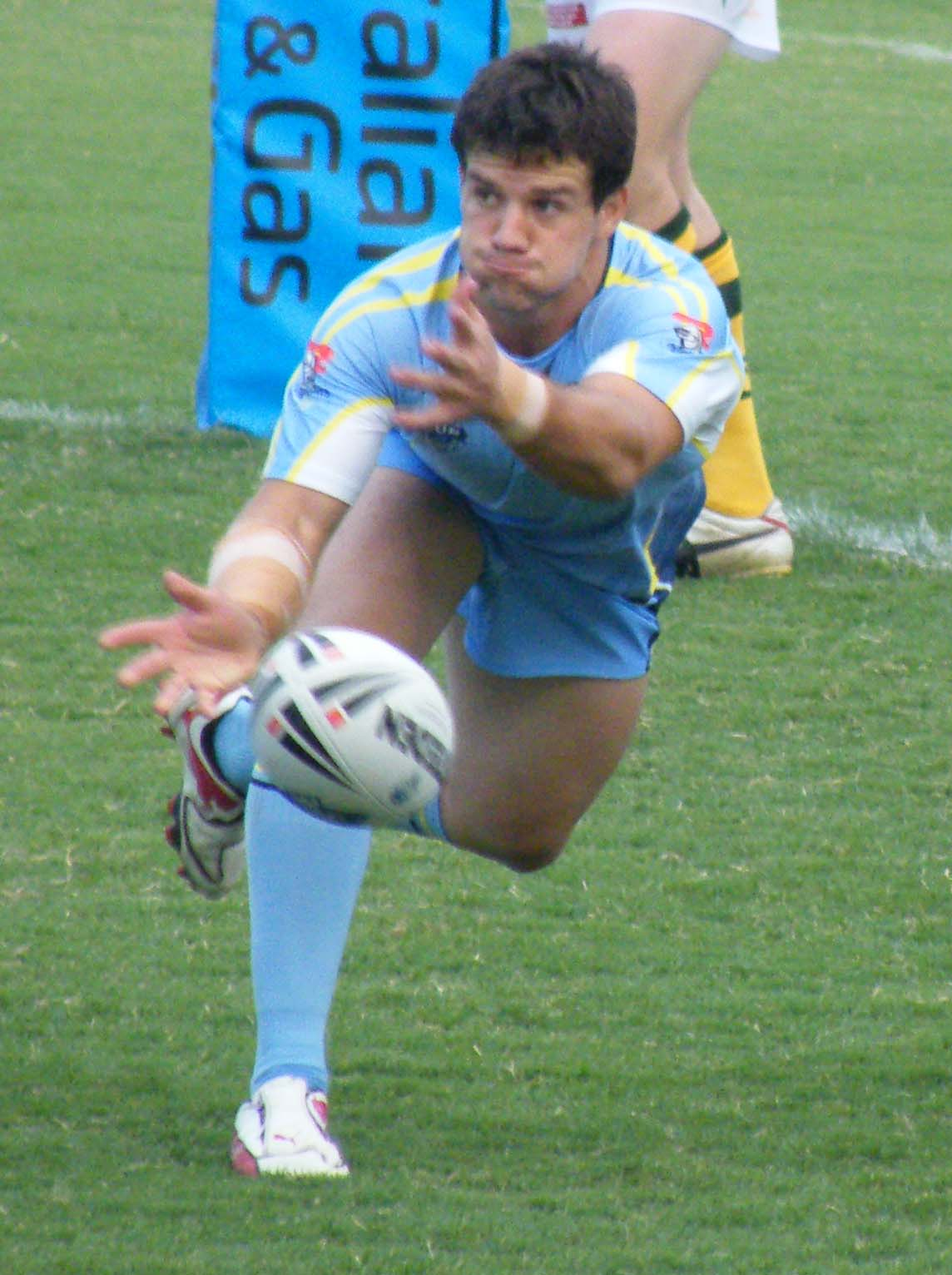
- Adams playing for the Central Coast Centurions in 2011.

Personal information
- Born: 12 August 1986 (age 39) Nambour, Queensland, Australia
- Height: 177 cm (5 ft 10 in)
- Weight: 86 kg (13 st 8 lb)

Playing information
- Position: Hooker
Club
Years	Team	Pld	T	G	FG	P
2012–16	Newcastle Knights	8	0	0	0	0
- Source: As of 6 August 2016

Chris Adams (born 12 August 1986) is an Australian professional rugby league footballer. He plays at hooker. He previously played for the Newcastle Knights in the National Rugby League.

== Background ==
Born in Nambour, Queensland, Adams played his junior football for the Bellingen Magpies, before moving down to the Central Coast, New South Wales in 2005 to play for the Wyong Roos in the Newcastle Rugby League.

== Playing career ==
=== Early career ===
In 2006, Adams played for the North Sydney Bears' Jersey Flegg Cup team, before returning to the Wyong Roos in 2007. In 2009, he joined the Cessnock Goannas. In 2010, he was signed by the Central Coast Centurions in the New South Wales Cup, before being elevated to the Newcastle Knights' NRL squad soon after.

=== 2012 ===
In Round 10 of the 2012 NRL season, Adams made his NRL debut for the Knights against the North Queensland Cowboys. He went on to play two more games that season.

=== 2013 ===
At the conclusion of the 2013 season, Adams was released by the Knights and rejoined the Cessnock Goannas in the Newcastle Rugby League.

=== 2014 ===
In June, Adams captained the Newcastle Rebels in the Country Rugby League championships.

=== 2015 ===
In 2015, Adams joined Lakes United, winning the Newcastle Rugby League premiership with them.

=== 2016 ===
On 29 June, Adams rejoined the Newcastle Knights mid-season on a contract until the end of 2016. He made his return in Round 19 against the Melbourne Storm, his first NRL game in four years. As part of the deal, Lakes United requested that he would be released in time for their finals campaign in the Newcastle Rugby League. After 5 matches with the Knights, he was released back to Lakes United.
