= Akuila Uate =

Australia & Fiji international rugby league footballer

Aku Uate
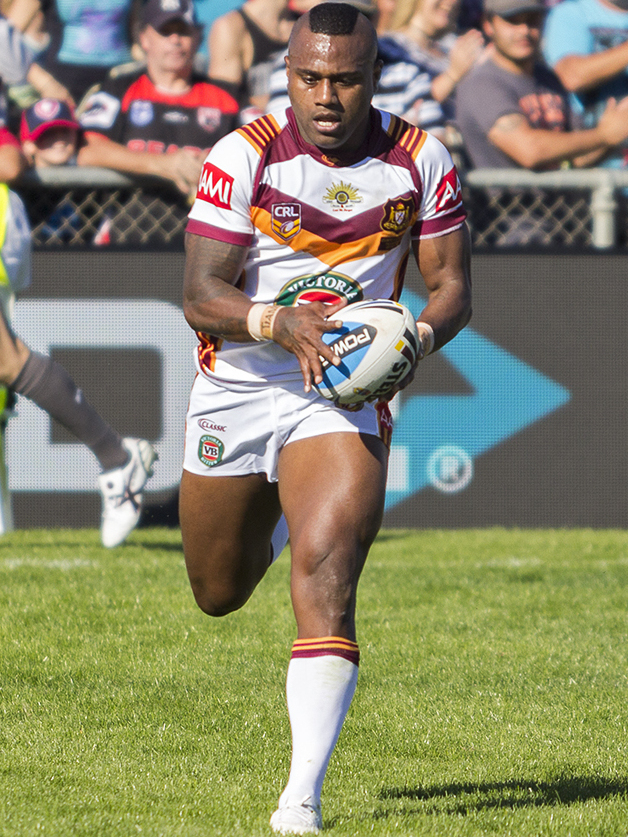

Personal information
- Full name: Akuila Uate
- Born: 6 October 1987 (age 39) Votua, Nadroga-Navosa Province, Fiji

Playing information
- Height: 6 ft 0 in (182 cm)
- Weight: 15 st 6 lb (98 kg)
- Position: Wing
Club
Years	Team	Pld	T	G	FG	P
2008–16	Newcastle Knights	161	110	0	0	440
2017–18	Manly Sea Eagles	39	19	0	0	76
2019	Huddersfield Giants	12	5	0	0	20
	Total	212	134	0	0	536
Representative
Years	Team	Pld	T	G	FG	P
2006–18	Fiji	18	14	0	0	56
2010–12	Prime Minister's XIII	2	2	0	0	8
2011–13	NRL All Stars	2	1	0	0	4
2011–15	Country NSW	3	3	0	0	12
2011–12	New South Wales	5	2	0	0	8
2011–12	Australia	5	3	0	0	12
2017	World All Stars	1	0	0	0	0

Akuila Uate (born 6 October 1987), also known by the nicknames of "Aku" and "Akuila the Thriller", is a former professional rugby league footballer who played on the wing. He was both a Fiji and Australian international.

He played for the Newcastle Knights, where he is the highest try-scorer in their history, as well as the Manly Warringah Sea Eagles in the NRL, and later the Huddersfield Giants in the Super League.

A three time Dally M Winger of the Year, he represented New South Wales in State of Origin. He also represented the Prime Minister's XIII, NRL All Stars, Country NSW and the World All Stars team.

== Background ==
Uate was born in Votua, in the province of Nadroga-Navosa, Fiji. He moved to Woy Woy, New South Wales, Australia, in 2003.

He played his junior football for the Woy Woy Roosters in New South Wales before being signed by the Newcastle Knights. As a junior, Uate came 3rd in the underage Australian sprinting finals. Uate was tipped as a future superstar by Knights legend, Andrew Johns. Johns said about Uate, "In all my years in rugby league I've never seen a better athlete than this bloke." He was also described by the talent scout who spotted him as "the next Lote Tuqiri". Uate played for the Knights' Premier League and Jersey Flegg teams in 2006. Uate scored a try in the 2006 Jersey Flegg Grand Final 22–20 defeat by the Penrith Panthers Jersey Flegg side. While attending Brisbane Waters Senior College, Uate played for the Australian schoolboys in 2005. On 7 October 2006, Uate represented Fiji in the 2008 Rugby League World Cup qualifying match against the Cook Islands, playing at centre and scoring a try in the 40–4 win at Penrith Stadium.

== Playing career ==
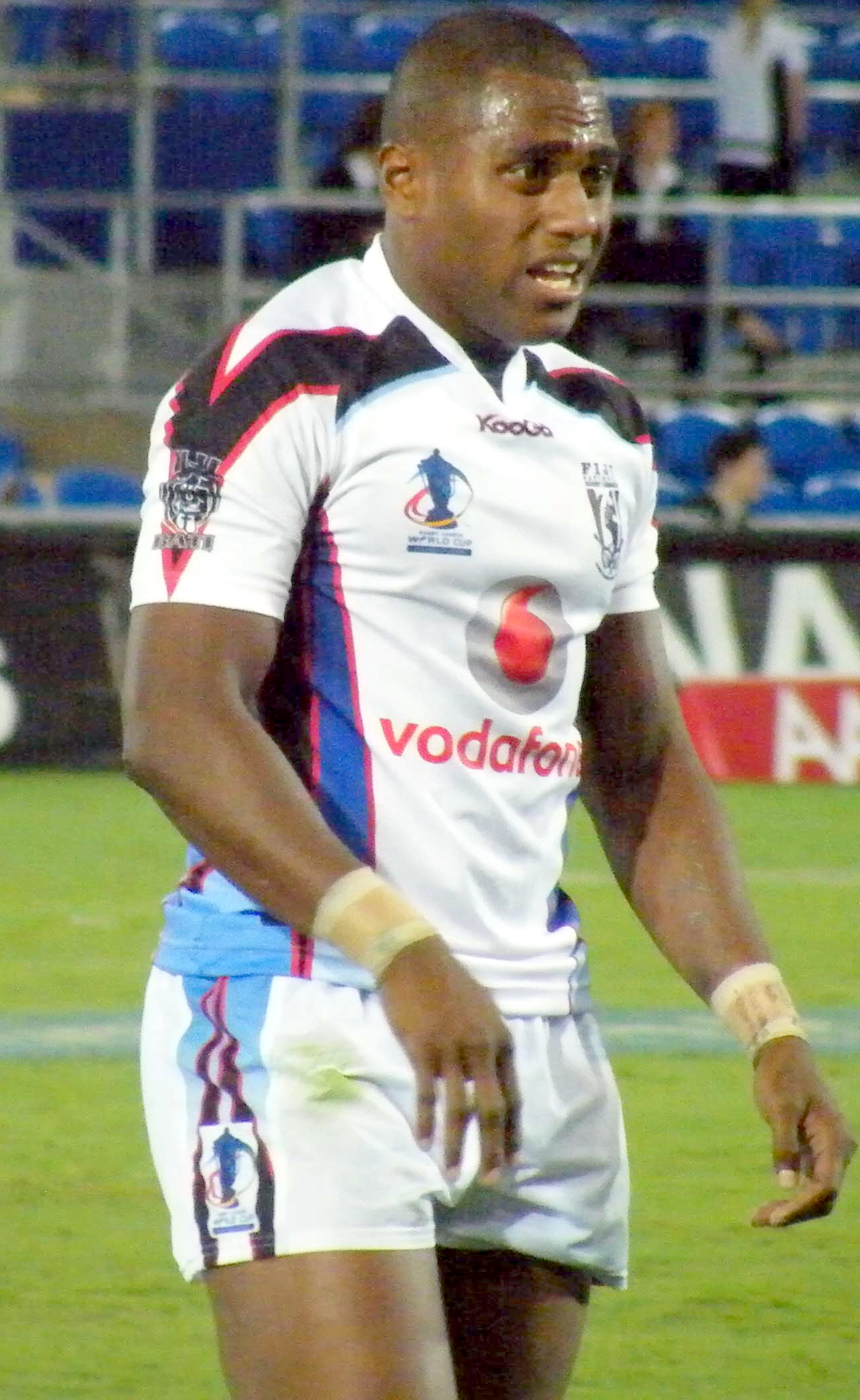
Uate playing for Fiji in 2008

=== 2008 ===
In Round 19 of the 2008 NRL season, Uate made his NRL debut for the Newcastle Knights against the Cronulla-Sutherland Sharks at centre and scored a try in the Knights 16–13 loss at Remondis Stadium. Uate finished his debut year in the NRL with him playing in 4 matches and scoring 3 tries for the Knights in the 2008 season. Uate played in the 2008 Rugby League World Cup for Fiji. Uate was considered one of the tournament's 'Players to Watch' by NRL Live pre-tournament and went on to score 5 tries in 4 matches, including a hat trick against France in Fiji's 42–6 win at WIN Stadium. He also led the competition for line-breaks as Fiji made it to the semi-finals of the tournament.

=== 2009 ===
In June 2009, Uate re-signed with the Knights on a 4-year contract. Uate finished the 2009 NRL season with him playing in 17 matches and scoring 8 tries for the Knights.

=== 2010 ===
In 2010, Uate started the season on the right wing due to regular right winger James McManus being injured. His form throughout the season kept McManus out of the right wing position. In Round 10 against the Sydney Roosters, Uate scored one of the best tries of the 2010 season, when he caught the ball from the Knights kick-off after conceding a try to the Roosters beforehand. Uate beat numerous defenders to score the try in the Knights 34–18 win at Central Coast Stadium. On 7 September 2010, at the 2010 Dally M awards, Uate won the Winger of the Year award as well as taking out the top try-scoring player award with 21 tries to his name in 24 matches. On 26 September 2010, Uate was selected in the Australian Prime Minister's XIII team to take on Papua New Guinea, Uate scored a try in the 30–18 win in Port Moresby.

=== 2011 ===
On 13 February 2011, Uate was chosen to play for the NRL All Stars on the wing and scored a try in the 28–12 victory over the Indigenous All Stars at Cbus Super Stadium. In May 2011, Uate was selected for the NSW Country Origin team in the annual City vs Country Origin match on the wing and scored the winning try for Country in the 18–12 win at Lavington Sports Ground in Albury, New South Wales. In May 2011, Uate was selected for New South Wales in Game 1 of the 2011 State of Origin series, making his debut on the wing in the Blues 16–12 loss at Suncorp Stadium. Uate played all 3 games of the series and scored a try in the 3rd game in the Blues 34–24 loss at Suncorp Stadium. In Round 26 against the South Sydney Rabbitohs, Uate scored four tries in the Knights 40–24 win at Hunter Stadium. On 6 September 2011, at the 2011 Dally M awards, Uate won the Winger of the Year for the 2nd time in a row. Uate finished the season as the highest try-scoring winger with 20 tries in 23 matches and lead the NRL in tackle-breaks. On 16 October 2011, Uate made his debut for Australia on the wing in a stand-alone test match against New Zealand held at Uate's home stadium, Hunter Stadium, scoring the first 2 tries of the match in the Kangaroos 42–6 win. In October and November 2011, Uate played for Australia in the 2011 Four Nations tournament, playing in 4 matches and scoring a try. Uate finished off the 2011 season by winning the RLPA Players' Player of the Year Award. On 3 November 2011, Uate won the RLIF's International Winger of the Year Award beating the likes of Jason Nightingale and Jharal Yow Yeh.

=== 2012 ===
On 20 April 2012, Uate played for Australia in the 2012 ANZAC Test against New Zealand on the wing in the Kangaroos 20–12 win at Eden Park. In May 2012, Uate was selected for New South Wales in Game 1 of the 2012 State of Origin series. Uate scored the opening try of the series in the Blues 18–10 loss at Etihad Stadium. Uate was later dropped for Game 3. On 4 September 2012, at the 2012 Dally M Awards, Uate was named the Winger of the Year for the 3rd consecutive season. Uate played 22 matches was the Newcastle Knights highest tryscorer of the 2012 NRL season with 18 tries. On 23 September 2012, Uate was selected for the Prime Minister's XIII team again with him scoring the last try of the game in the 24–18 victory over Papua New Guinea in Port Moresby.

=== 2013 ===
On 13 February 2013, Uate was chosen to play for the NRL All Stars team on the wing in the 32–6 loss over the Indigenous All Stars at Suncorp Stadium. On 6 March 2013, after speculation that Uate was going to sign with a Japanese rugby union club, he re-signed with the Knights on a 4-year contract to the end of the 2017 season. On 3 May 2011, Uate was selected for the NSW Country Origin in the annual City vs Country Origin match on the wing and scored a try in the 18–12 win in Coffs Harbour. In Round 11 against the New Zealand Warriors, Uate played his 100th NRL career match for the Newcastle Knights in the 28–12 loss at Mt Smart Stadium. Uate finished the 2013 NRL season having played in 24 matches and scoring 15 tries for the Newcastle Knights. In October 2013, Uate switched back his international eligibility to his native Fiji and he was named in their squad for the 2013 Rugby League World Cup. Uate played in 4 matches and scored 3 tries, all scored against Ireland in Fiji's 32–14 win at Spotland Stadium.

=== 2014 ===
In February 2014, Uate was selected in the Newcastle Knights inaugural 2014 Auckland Nines squad. In Round 13 against the Wests Tigers, Uate broke Timana Tahu's record for most tries scored for the Newcastle Knights. Uate became the Knights highest tryscorer ever with 93 tries, scoring a hat trick in the 23–20 loss at Hunter Stadium. In Round 22 against the Melbourne Storm, Uate scored a try in the corner win the match for the Knights after overcoming a 30–20 deficit with 2 minutes to go, with later Kurt Gidley kicking the winning goal resulting with the Knights 32–30 winners at Hunter Stadium. Uate finished off the 2014 NRL season with him being the Knights highest tryscorer with 12 tries in 15 matches.

=== 2015 ===
In Round 6 against the Cronulla-Sutherland Sharks, Uate scored his 100th NRL career try in the Knights' 22–6 loss at Remondis Stadium. On 3 May, he played for New South Wales Country against New South Wales City in the 2015 City vs Country Origin match, playing on the wing and scoring a try in Country's 34–22 win at Wagga Wagga. In Round 25 against the Canterbury-Bankstown Bulldogs, he played his 150th NRL match in the Knights' 20–18 loss at Hunter Stadium. He finished off the 2015 season as the Knights' highest try-scorer with 12 tries in 22 matches as the club finished last.

=== 2016 ===
In February, Uate played for the Knights in the 2016 NRL Auckland Nines. On 7 May, he played for Fiji against Papua New Guinea in the 2016 Melanesian Cup. After round 12 against the Parramatta Eels, he was demoted to the Knights' Intrust Super Premiership NSW team where he failed to break in the Knights' top 17 for the rest of the season. He finished the 2016 season having played in 10 matches and scoring 1 try. In October, he was released from the final year of his Knights contract to sign a 2-year contract with the Manly Warringah Sea Eagles starting in 2017.

=== 2017 ===
In round 1 of 2017 season, Uate made his debut for the Sea Eagles in their 12–20 loss at Brookvale Oval against the Parramatta Eels. He played 24 matches and scored 14 tries. Uate was selected in the Fiji 24-man squad for the 2017 Rugby League World Cup. On 5 November against Wales, he used his speed and foot work to beat a handful of Wales players, before pushing a one-handed passed around the back of the last defender, finding his winger Marcelo Montoya, who dived over for a try. Uate was awarded the man of a match award as Fiji won 72–6 win at 1300SMILES Stadium. He played 5 matches and scored 1 try in the tournament.

=== 2018 ===
In June, Uate signed a 3-year contract with Super League side Huddersfield Giants, starting in 2019.

=== 2020 ===
In November, Uate announced his retirement from the game.

== Statistics ==
Year	Team	Games	Tries	Pts
2008	Newcastle Knights	4	3	12
2009	Newcastle Knights	17	8	32
2010	Newcastle Knights	24	21	84
2011	Newcastle Knights	23	20	80
2012	Newcastle Knights	22	18	72
2013	Newcastle Knights	24	15	60
2014	Newcastle Knights	15	12	48
2015	Newcastle Knights	22	12	48
2016	Newcastle Knights	10	1	4
2017	Manly Warringah Sea Eagles	24	14	56
2018	Manly Warringah Sea Eagles	15	5	20
2019	Huddersfield Giants	12	5	20
	Totals	212	134	536
