= Daniel Tolar =

Australian rugby league footballer

Personal information
- Full name: Daniel Tolar
- Born: 11 April 1982 (age 43); Newcastle, New South Wales, Australia
- Height: 188 cm (6 ft 2 in)
- Weight: 102 kg (16 st 1 lb)

Playing information
- Position: Prop
Club
Years	Team	Pld	T	G	FG	P
2004–11	Newcastle Knights	101	5	0	0	20
- Source: As of 8 February 2019

Daniel Tolar (born 11 April 1982) is an Australian former professional rugby league footballer who played 101 games for the Newcastle Knights, primarily as a prop.

== Background ==
Tolar was born in Newcastle, New South Wales.

== Playing career ==
Tolar made his first grade debut in round 12 of the 2004 NRL season against Melbourne.

In 2005, Tolar made 20 appearances as Newcastle suffered a horrid season on the field finishing last with the wooden spoon.

In 2010, in reward for his long service at the club, he was awarded the captaincy of the Newcastle Knights in the Round 14 game against the New Zealand Warriors due to the absence of regular captain Kurt Gidley and vice-captain Steve Simpson.

On 26 September 2011, Tolar announced his retirement from the game after ongoing knee and Achilles tendon injuries.
