= Zane Tetevano =

New Zealand and Cook Islands international rugby league footballer

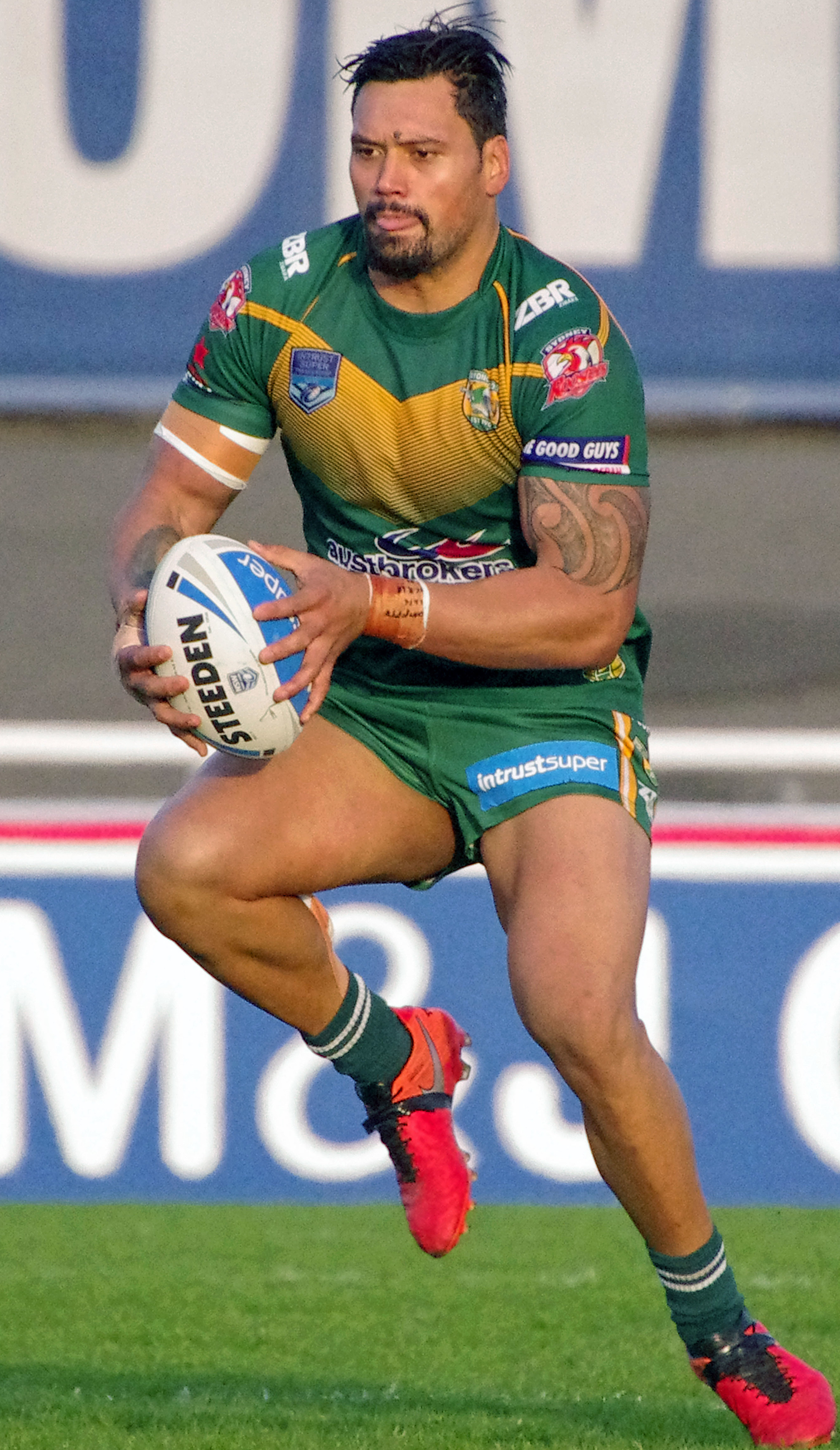

Personal information
- Full name: Zane Anthony Faulkner Tetevano
- Born: 4 November 1990 (age 36) Tokoroa, Waikato, New Zealand

Playing information
- Height: 6 ft 2 in (1.87 m)
- Weight: 16 st 7 lb (105 kg)
- Position: Prop, Lock
Club
Years	Team	Pld	T	G	FG	P
2011–14	Newcastle Knights	29	2	0	0	8
2017–19	Sydney Roosters	74	1	0	0	4
2020	Penrith Panthers	19	0	0	0	0
2021–23	Leeds Rhinos	48	3	0	0	12
	Total	170	6	0	0	24
Representative
Years	Team	Pld	T	G	FG	P
2009–24	Cook Islands	12	0	0	0	0
2019	New Zealand	3	0	0	0	0
2020	Māori All Stars	1	0	0	0	0
2022	Combined Nations All Stars	1	0	0	0	0

Zane Tetevano (born 4 November 1990) is a former professional rugby league footballer who played as a prop and represented the Cook Islands, New Zealand, and the New Zealand Māori at international level.

Tetevano played in the National Rugby League (NRL) for the Newcastle Knights, Sydney Roosters, with whom he won the 2018 NRL Grand Final, and Penrith Panthers. He also played for the Leeds Rhinos in the Super League.

== Background ==
Tetevano was born in Tokoroa, New Zealand, and is of Cook Islander and Maori descent.

Tetevano played his junior football for the Pacific Sharks before being signed by the Newcastle Knights. In 2006, Tetevano played for the New Zealand Under 16s team.

== Playing career ==
=== Newcastle Knights ===
From 2008 to 2010, Tetevano played for the Newcastle Knights' NYC team.

In 2011, Tetevano moved on to the Knights' New South Wales Cup team.

In Round 20 of the 2011 NRL season, Tetevano made his NRL debut for Newcastle against the Cronulla-Sutherland Sharks.

In August 2011, Tetevano re-signed with the Knights on a 2-year contract.

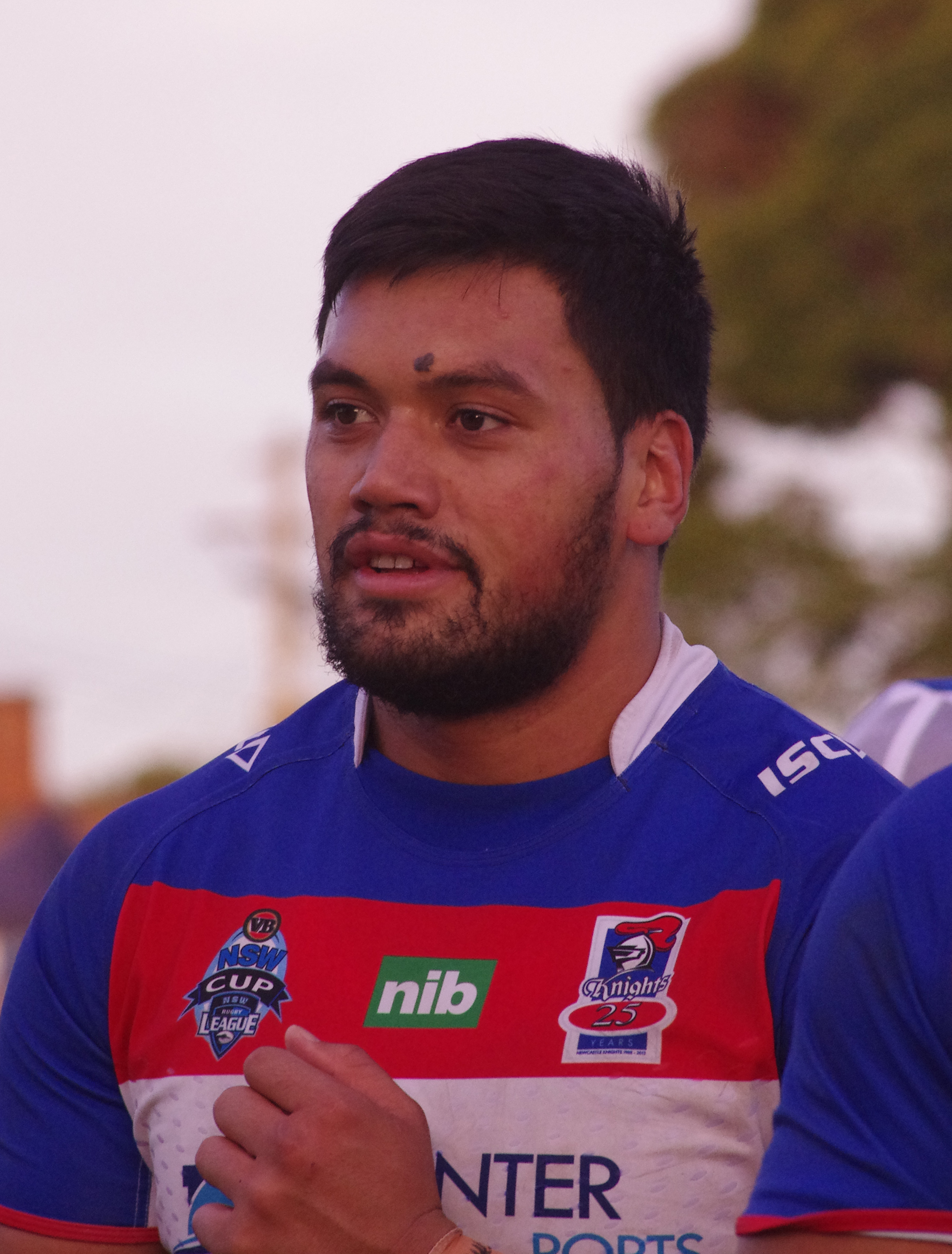
Tetevano playing for the Newcastle Knights in 2012

On 16 October 2013, Tetevano again re-signed with the Newcastle Knights on a 2-year contract.

On 14 May 2014, Tetevano was sacked by the Newcastle Knights due to disciplinary reasons.

=== Wyong Roos ===
Tetevano joined the Wyong Roos in the New South Wales Cup for the rest of 2014. On July 1, 2024 he would re-join the Wyong Roos after departing from the Canterbury-Bankstown Bulldogs.

=== Manly ===
On 1 October 2014, Tetevano signed a 1-year contract with the Manly-Warringah Sea Eagles starting in 2015.

On 2 October 2014, Tetevano had his contract with Manly-Warringah terminated after he admitted in court to bashing his girlfriend on four occasions.

In September 2016, Tetevano was named at lock in the 2016 Intrust Super Premiership NSW Team of the Year.

=== Sydney Roosters ===
On 1 October 2016, Tetevano signed a 1-year contract with the Sydney Roosters starting in 2017.

On 30 September 2018, Tetevano was part of the Sydney Roosters side which defeated Melbourne 21-6 in the 2018 NRL Grand Final.

In round 25 2019, Tetevano played his 100th NRL game in the Roosters 16-10 loss to South Sydney at ANZ Stadium. Tetevano made 24 appearances for the Sydney Roosters in the 2019 NRL season as the club reached the 2019 NRL Grand Final. Tetevano was initially named in the grand final team but was then replaced by Jake Friend and missed out on playing in the club's premiership victory over Canberra. Following the match, Sydney Roosters head coach Trent Robinson gave Tetevano his premiership ring.

=== Penrith Panthers ===
On 26 November 2019, Tetevano signed a three-year contract with Penrith worth around $350,000 starting in the 2020 NRL season.

On 25 October 2020, Tetevano played off the bench in the NRL Grand Final, as the Panthers lost 26-20 to the Melbourne Storm.

=== Leeds Rhinos ===
On 26 December 2020, it was reported that Tetevano would join Leeds for the 2021 season.

In the Challenge Cup third-round match against St Helens, Tetevano was sent off in the club's defeat for the first time in his career. He was later given a four-match ban and fined £500. Tetevano played for Leeds in their 36-8 loss against St Helens in the semi-final as the club fell one match short of the 2021 Super League Grand Final. In round 16 of the 2022 Super League season, Tetevano was given a red card for a dangerous tackle during Leeds 42-12 loss against St Helens. On 24 September 2022, Tetevano played for Leeds in their 24-12 loss to St Helens RFC in the 2022 Super League Grand Final. In round 12 of the 2023 Super League season, Tetevano was given a red card for a dangerous high tackle during Leeds 40-18 victory over Wigan. In June 2023, it was revealed that Tetevano had suffered a stroke during a training session earlier in the year and would require surgery to repair the hole in his heart. Tetevano was cleared to return to non-impact aerobic training, but not yet contact sport.

=== Canterbury-Bankstown Bulldogs ===
On 29 February 2024, Canterbury-Bankstown announced that they had signed Tetevano for the 2024 season. Tetevano played 11 reserve-grade games for the Bulldogs in 2024 as a prop and bench forward. Tetevano confirmed that he would retire from the NRL at the end of the season.

Since his exit from the Bulldogs, Tetevano has played as a prop for the Wyong Roos in the Newcastle Rugby League's Denton Engineering Cup.

== International ==
In 2009, Tetevano played for the Cook Islands in the 2009 Pacific Cup and again in 2010.

At the end of 2013, Tetevano played for the Cook Islands in the 2013 Rugby League World Cup held in England and Wales.

== Domestic violence conviction ==
In 2014, Tetevano pled guilty and was sentenced to at least nine months jail for bashing his then girlfriend on four separate occasions. However, the jail time was overturned on appeal. During the appeal Judge Roy Ellis was "impressed with his rehabilitation", and Tetevano's commitment to living "a simple life", while his lawyer argued that he had "no desire to return to the toxic environment that the NRL invites".
