= Marvin Karawana =

New Zealand rugby league footballer

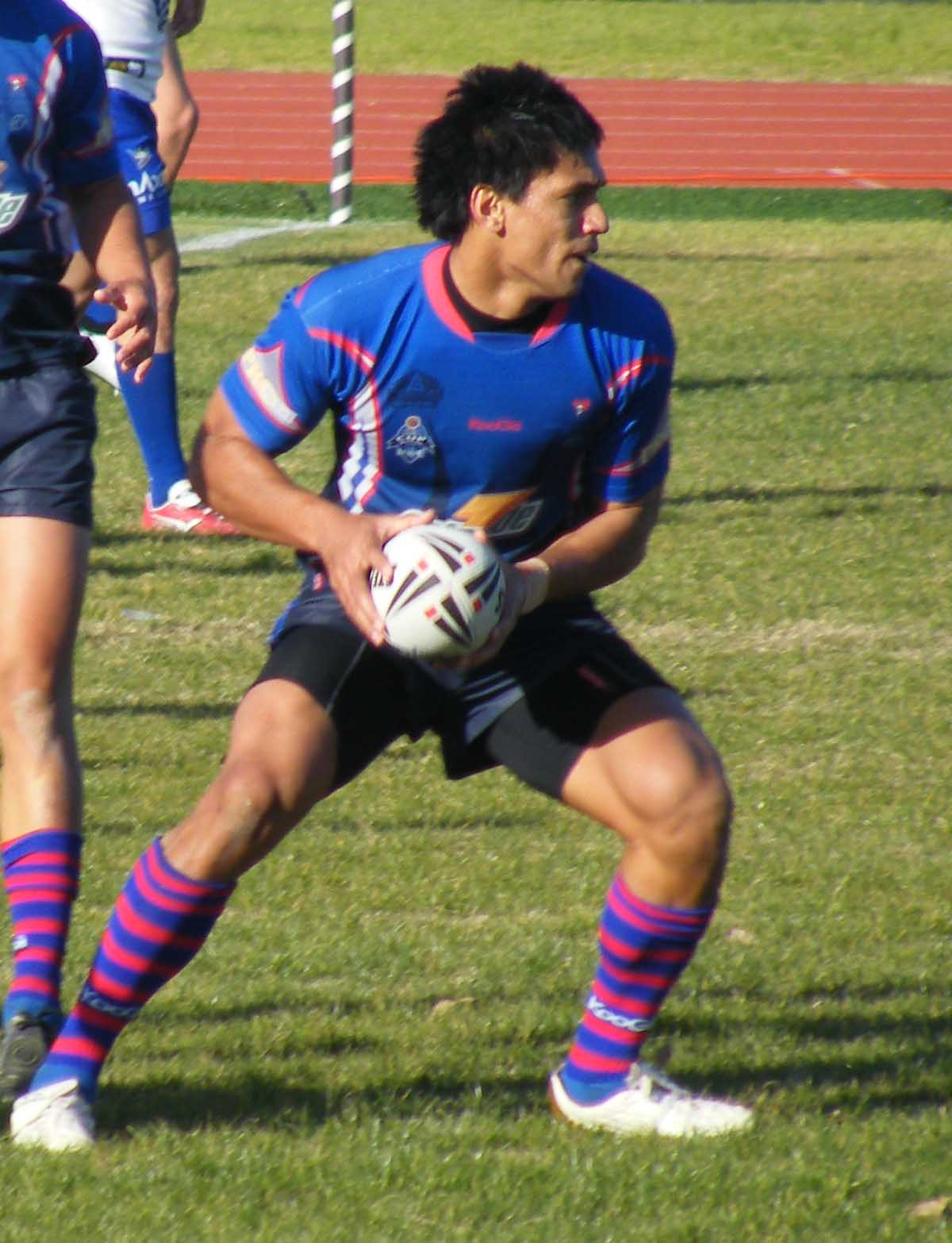

Personal information
- Born: 30 July 1986 (age 40) Wainuiomata, New Zealand
- Height: 183 cm (6 ft 0 in)
- Weight: 98 kg (15 st 6 lb)

Playing information
- Position: Lock, Second-row, Five-eighth
Club
Years	Team	Pld	T	G	FG	P
2007–11	Newcastle Knights	34	1	0	0	4
- Source: As of 8 September 2009

Marvin Karawana (born 30 July 1986, in Wainuiomata, New Zealand) is a former professional rugby union and rugby league player. He last played for Wellington in the National Rugby sevens competition in New Zealand. He previously played for the Newcastle Knights in the National Rugby League. He primarily plays lock, second-row and five-eighth.

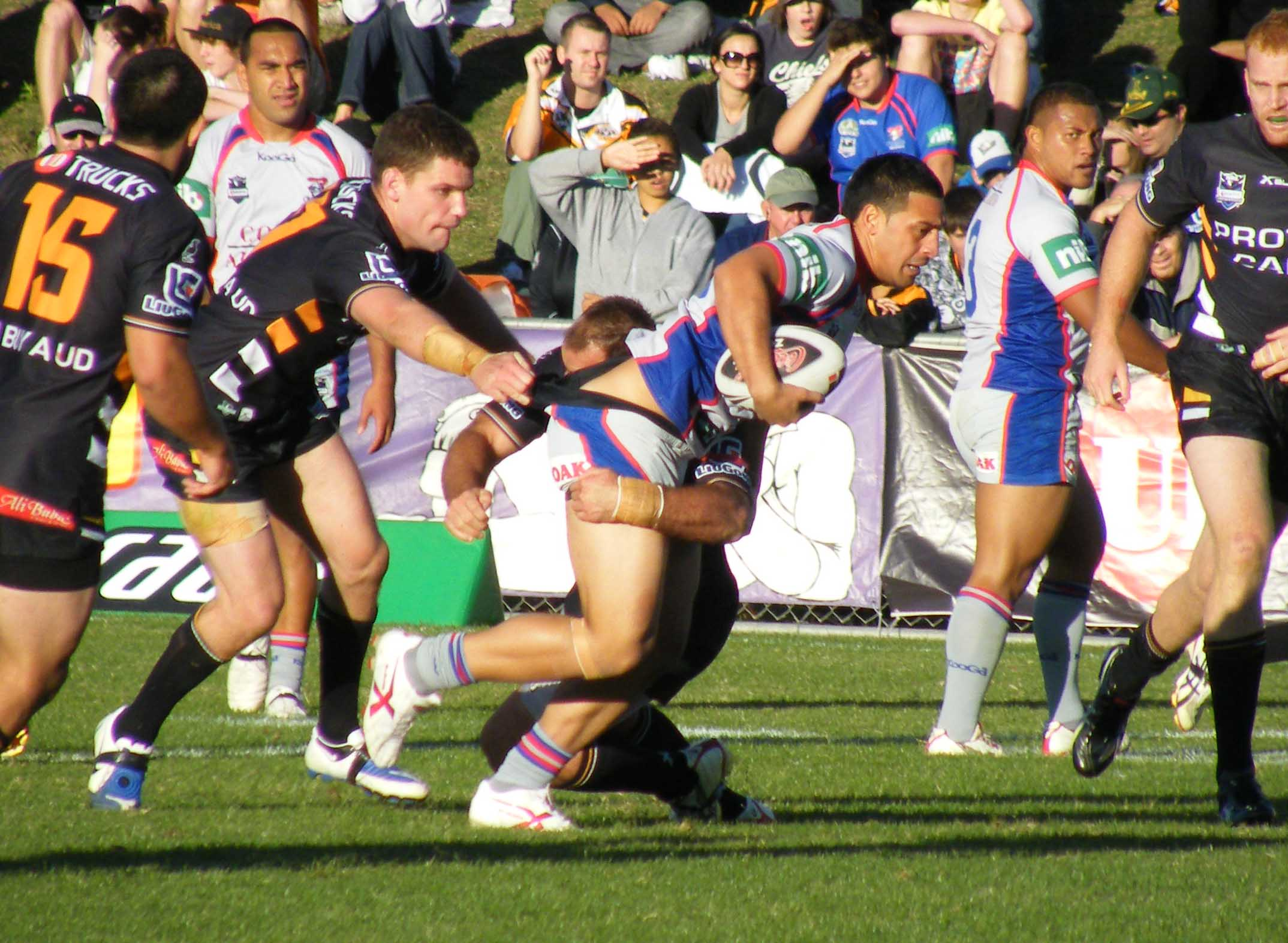
Karawana breaks through a tackle in 2009.

== Playing career ==
Karawana attended St. Bernard's College in Wellington and is a Wainuiomata Lions junior.

Karawana made his first grade debut for the Newcastle Knights during the Round 9 encounter with the New Zealand Warriors on 12 May 2007. Karawana pushed his way into the first grade team in 2009 and was used off the interchange bench as a Utility player, playing mostly in the backrow or as an extra playmaker.

He tore his anterior cruciate ligament (ACL) in a NSW Cup trial game in the 2010 pre-season which ruled him out of the entire 2010 season.

In 2011, he made his return to the NRL against the St. George Illawarra Dragons in Round 4.

After the conclusion of the 2011 season, Karawana was released by Newcastle outfit.

He returned to New Zealand in 2012 to play Rugby sevens for Wellington in the national competition. He was nicknamed by his teammates "Wainui SBW", due to his similar propensity to offload the ball in the tackle.
