= Kurt Gidley =

Australia international rugby league footballer

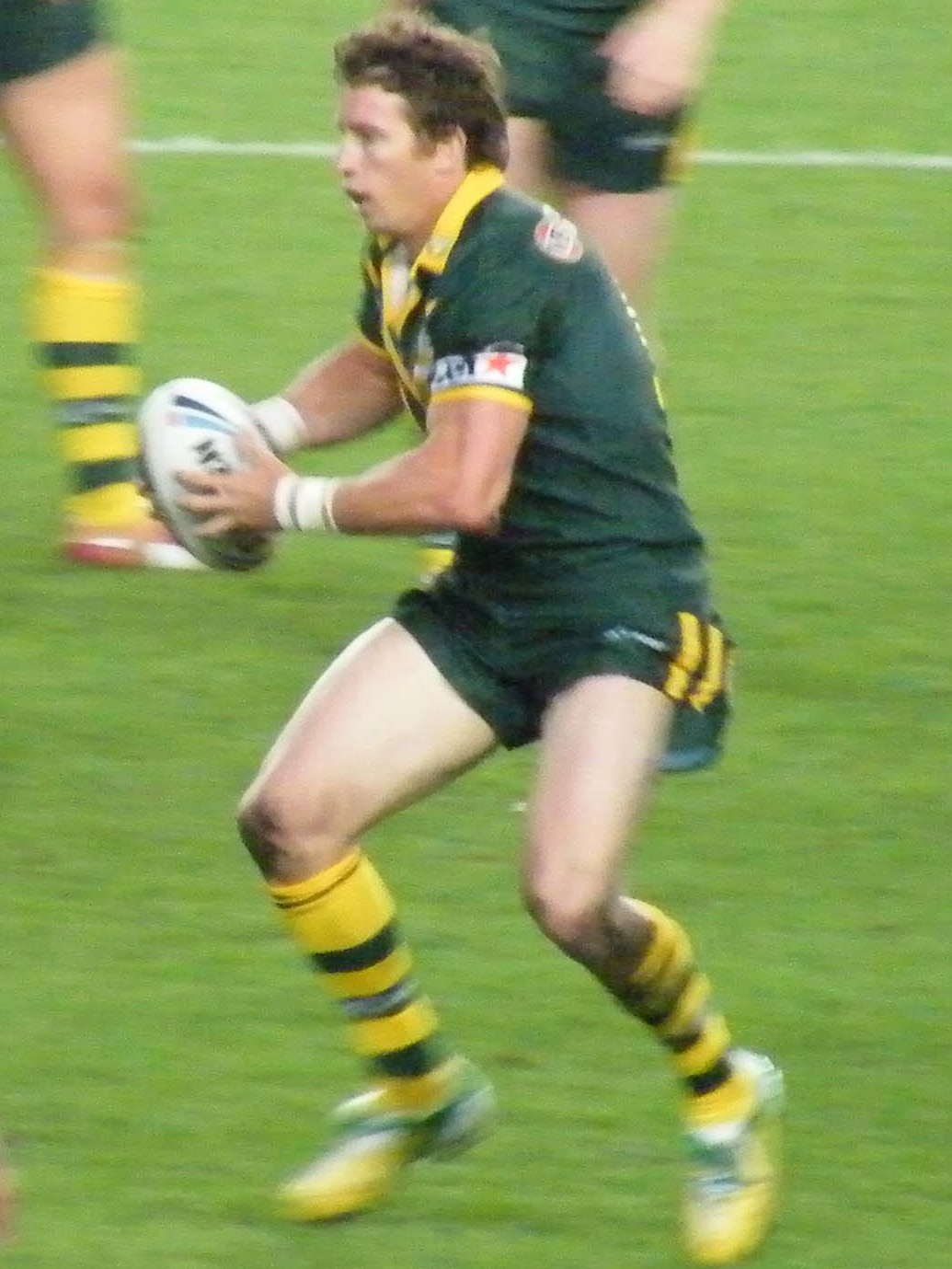

Personal information
- Full name: Kurt Geoffrey Gidley
- Born: 7 June 1982 (age 44) Newcastle, New South Wales, Australia

Playing information
- Height: 178 cm (5 ft 10 in)
- Weight: 86 kg (13 st 8 lb)
- Position: Fullback, Five-eighth, Halfback, Hooker
Club
Years	Team	Pld	T	G	FG	P
2001–15	Newcastle Knights	251	80	452	4	1228
2016–17	Warrington Wolves	55	15	116	0	282
	Total	306	95	568	4	1510
Representative
Years	Team	Pld	T	G	FG	P
2004–07	NSW Country	3	1	0	0	4
2005–07	Prime Minister's XIII	3	2	2	0	12
2007–11	New South Wales	12	1	7	0	18
2007–13	Australia	12	0	3	0	6
2010–11	NRL All Stars	2	0	1	0	2
- Relatives: Matt Gidley (brother)

Kurt Geoffrey Gidley (born 7 June 1982) is an Australian former professional rugby league footballer who last played for the Warrington Wolves in the Super League. An Australia international and New South Wales State of Origin representative and captain, he previously played in the National Rugby League for the Newcastle Knights, captaining them for 123 games. He played as a fullback, five-eighth, halfback and hooker, although due to his versatility, he was able to slip into the positions of centre and lock when needed throughout his career.

In 2011, Gidley competed in the third season of the Channel Seven television series Australia's Greatest Athlete.

== Early and personal life ==
Gidley was born in Newcastle, New South Wales, Australia.

He is the younger brother of Matthew Gidley, and is the youngest of three brothers. He was an apprentice butcher when he left high school. Gidley's current partner is Brooke McNamara. He was a Hunter Mariners junior.

== Playing career ==
=== 2000s ===
Gidley made his NRL debut for the Newcastle Knights in 2001 at 19 years of age where he played Five-eighth in a round 24 loss to St George Illawarra. However Gidley did not feature in the Knights successful finals run.

After winning the 2001 NRL Premiership, the Knights travelled to England to play the 2002 World Club Challenge against Super League champions, the Bradford Bulls. Gidley played on the wing in Newcastle's loss. Gidley had a productive 2004 season (being 18th man for the NSW Blues). In round 10 of the 2004 NRL season Gidley made history when he won the Knights' first ever golden point match by kicking the winning field goal after 3 minutes and 26 seconds of extra time. The Knights were without Andrew Johns for the season. That game was against the Broncos at Lang Park (Suncorp Stadium). Gidley missed most of the 2005 NRL season due to injury.

In 2006, Gidley travelled to Papua New Guinea to play for the Prime Minister's XIII against the Kumuls. Gidley had a productive season in 2007. He scored multiple times for the Newcastle Knights as well as having done well at converting goals. He scored 15 points against the South Sydney Rabbitohs in their round 5 clash including 2 tries 3/4 goals and a field goal. He has also represented NSW in 2007 State of Origin.

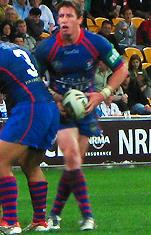
Gidley playing for the Knights in 2008

He was then selected in the 2008 State of Origin series shortly after a fractured cheekbone Gidley was the stand-out player at the club in the 2008 season as they finished ninth on the NRL ladder with 12 wins and 12 losses. Gidley led the scoring at the club with 150 points and also took the try-scoring award with nine tries. Regarded as one of the best utility players in the game, Gidley was also appointed captain of the Knights for the next season, replacing England-bound hooker and club legend Danny Buderus. In August 2008, Gidley was named in the preliminary 46-man Kangaroos squad for the 2008 Rugby League World Cup, and in October 2008 he was selected in the final 24-man Australia squad. He was selected for Australia in the one-off test match against New Zealand on 8 May 2009.

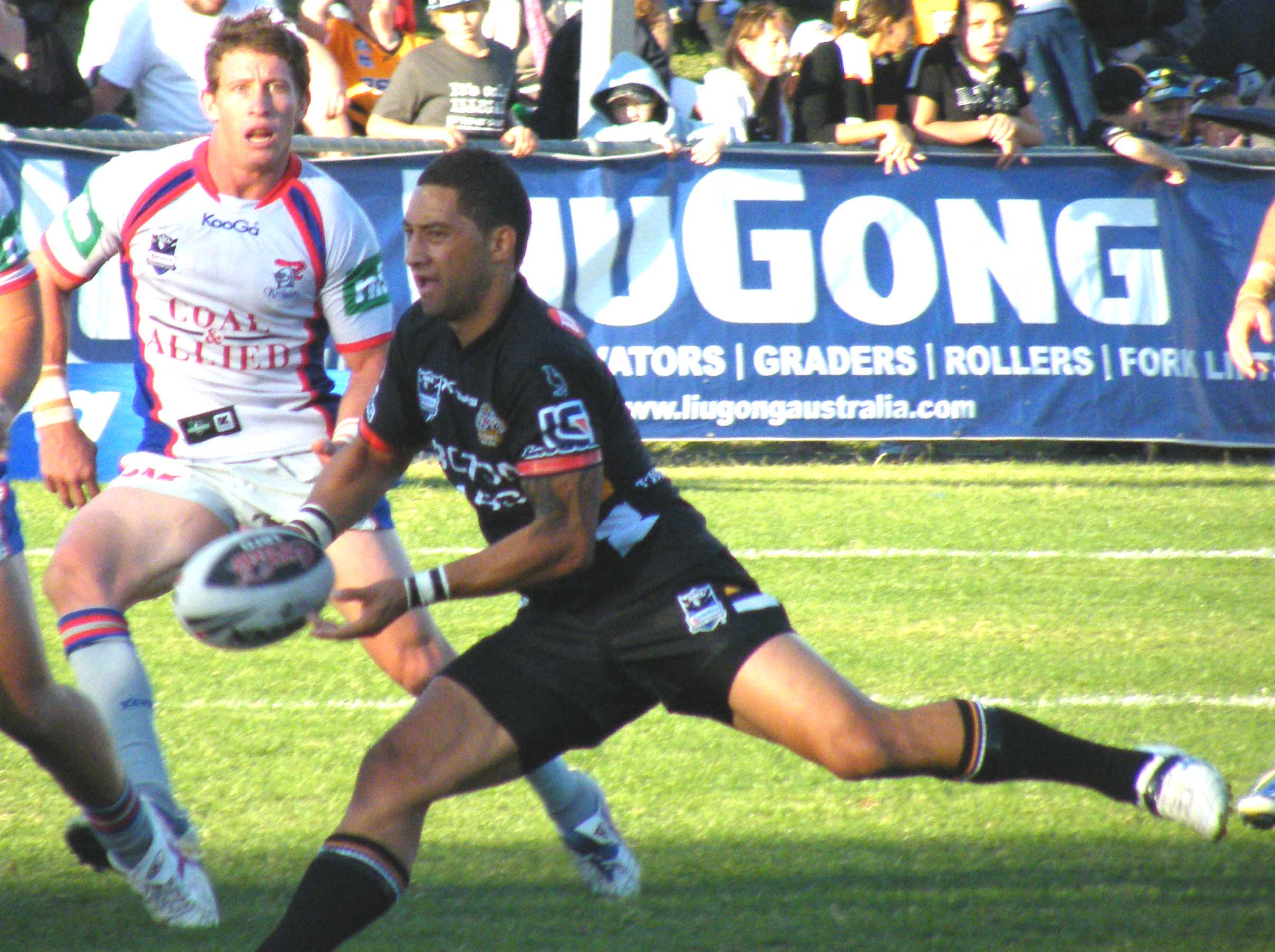
Gidley trying to tackle Benji Marshall in 2009

In May 2009, he was named as captain and fullback to represent New South Wales in the opening State of Origin match on 3 June 2009, in Melbourne. In the 2009 season Kurt Gidley again led the club's season in points as the Knights finished 7th after a good year. Kurt also achieved the second best percentage of kicking goals, with 82.1%, only being beaten by Michael Gordon with 93.4%. In November 2009, he was named in the Australian national team to take part in the 2009 Four Nations. In Australia's opening game of the tournament against New Zealand he played as the 17th man utility, making an impact in the last quarter of the game. In game three against France, he was chosen to replace regular fullback Billy Slater who was rested along with others. He successfully converted two goals which played part in the final 42–4 Australian win. On 7 November, Gidley was chosen on the interchange bench for the Four Nations final played in Leeds in which the Kangaroos thrashed England 46–16. He was brought on into the centres to replace an injured Justin Hodges early in the game.

=== 2010s ===
In January 2010, Gidley was named in the NRL All Stars team to play on 13 February 2010. He was voted as the Knight's representative after beating Ben Cross, Chris Houston and Jarrod Mullen. Kurt suffered a knee injury in the game which left him side-lined until Round 6 of the 2010 season. For the 2010 ANZAC Test, Gidley was selected to play for Australia from the interchange bench in their victory against New Zealand. On 7 May, 28 minutes into the Test match, starting Australian hooker Cameron Smith came off the field with a shoulder injury, which led to Gidley coming on and playing dummy half for the rest of the game. On 17 May 2010 Gidley was named as fullback and captain of the New South Wales Blues. For the first time in Origin history, Gidley captained the side from the reserves bench for Game 2. During a team bonding session on 10 June 2010 Gidley's ex teammate and friend Andrew Johns who at the time was the NSW assistant coach caused controversy when it emerged that he had encouraged a player to attack Queensland player Greg Inglis, referring to him as a "black cunt". Gidley defended Andrew Johns as not a racist and stipulated that "He's obviously still going to be a great mate of mine." Game 3 of the 2010 State of Origin series saw Gidley again starting from the bench, and this time stripped of his captaincy. Gidley came on to replace Michael Ennis after 30 minutes and went on to play the rest of the game. Just before half-time, Gidley set up an inside pass for second-row Paul Gallen to crash over the try line for New South Wales first try of the game. In the 47th minute, Kurt scored the next try for the Blues which narrowed the point deficit to just one. He continued to make several linebreaks and defended strong. Gidley was later awarded the Brad Fittler Medal for NSW's Player of the Series. At the end of the 2010 season, Gidley was selected to play for Australia for the Four Nations Tournament. He played in 3 out of the 4 games and played in the final against New Zealand. He played the whole 2nd half of the final in the centres due to a knee injury to teammate Brent Tate.

2011 saw Gidley selected in the NRL All Stars team for a second year in a row after Wayne Bennett used one of his two personal picks for Gidley.

Gidley was selected for Australia in the 2013 ANZAC Test and played from the interchange bench. In what was the first test match ever played in Canberra, New Zealand were defeated.

On 5 May 2015, Gidley signed a 1-year contract with Super League team Warrington Wolves, with an option for a second year, starting in 2016, ending a 15-year stint in the National Rugby League.

On his Super League début for the Wolves, Gidley converted 2 goals in a man of the match performance against 2015 champions the Leeds Rhinos. In April, he picked up the Super League Player of the Month award.

He played in the 2016 Challenge Cup Final defeat by Hull F.C. at Wembley Stadium.

He played in the 2016 Super League Grand Final defeat by the Wigan Warriors at Old Trafford.

In June 2017 it was announced that Gidley would retire at the end of the 2017 season.

== Personal life ==
Gidley is founder and co-owner of Steel City Beer Company with Andrew Johns, Matthew Johns, Danny Buderus, and Matt Hoy.
