= List of St. George Illawarra Dragons representatives =

This is a list of St. George Illawarra Dragons players who have gone on to play representative rugby league while at the club and the year(s) which they achieved the honour. Representatives from the Shellharbour City Dragons are included as they are a feeder club.

== International ==
=== Australia ===
- (Australia) Shaun Timmins (1999–2000, 2002–04)
- (Australia) Trent Barrett (2000–02, 2005)
- (Australia) Nathan Blacklock (2001)
- (Australia) Mark Gasnier (2001, 2005–08)
- (Australia) Jason Ryles (2001–02, 2004–05)
- (Australia) Luke Bailey (2003–04)
- (Australia) Matt Cooper (2004–06)
- (Australia) Ben Creagh (2005, 2011)
- (Australia) Ben Hornby (2006)
- (Australia) Darius Boyd (2009–11)
- (Australia) Brett Morris (2009–14)
- (Australia) Michael Weyman (2010)
- (Australia) Dean Young (2010)
- (Australia) Beau Scott (2011)
- (Australia) Josh Dugan (2015–16)
- (Australia) Trent Merrin (2015)
- (Australia) Tyson Frizell (2016–2017)
- (Australia) Ben Hunt (2018–19, 2022–23)
- (Australia) Paul Vaughan (2019)
- (Australia) Zac Lomax (2024)

=== Cook Islands ===
- (Cook Islands) Daniel Fepuleai (2009)
- (Cook Islands) Steven Marsters (2019)
- (Cook Islands) Valentine Holmes (2026)

=== England ===
- (England) Gareth Widdop (2014–19)
- (England) Mike Cooper (2015)
- (England) James Graham (2018)

=== Fiji ===
- (Fiji) Eto Nabuli (2015)
- (Fiji) Mikaele Ravalawa (2019, 2022–23)
- (Fiji) Korbin Sims (2019)

=== Great Britain ===
- (United Kingdom) Gareth Widdop (2019)
- (United Kingdom) James Graham (2019)

=== Italy ===
- (Italy) Paul Vaughan (2017)

=== Lebanon ===
- (Lebanon) Hassan Saleh (2003)

=== New Zealand ===
- (New Zealand) Craig Smith (1999–01)
- (New Zealand) Chase Stanley (2007)
- (New Zealand) Jason Nightingale (2008–16)
- (New Zealand) Nathan Fien (2009–12)
- (New Zealand) Jeremy Smith (2009–10)
- (New Zealand) Gerard Beale (2014)
- (New Zealand) Russell Packer (2017)

=== Papua New Guinea ===
- (Papua New Guinea) Luke Page (2015)
- (Papua New Guinea) Nene Macdonald (2017)

=== Samoa ===
- (Samoa) Lagi Setu (2008)
- (Samoa) Kyle Stanley (2009)
- (Samoa) Leeson Ah Mau (2013–17)
- (Samoa) Daniel Vidot (2013)
- (Samoa) Tim Lafai (2016–19)
- (Samoa) Luciano Leilua (2019, 2024)
- (Samoa) Francis Molo (2022, 2024)
- (Samoa) Jaydn Su'A (2022, 2024–25)
- (Samoa) Mathew Feagai (2022)

=== Scotland ===
- (Scotland) Daniel Heckenberg (2000)
- (Scotland) Euan Aitken (2016)

=== Tonga ===
- (Tonga) Moses Suli (2022–24)
- (Tonga) Junior Amone (2022)

=== Wales ===
- (Wales) Tyson Frizell (2013)

== International 9s ==
=== Australia ===
- (Australia) Tyson Frizell (2019)
- (Australia) Ben Hunt (2019)

=== Cook Islands ===
- (Cook Islands) Steven Marsters (2019)

=== England ===
- (England) Gareth Widdop (2019)
- (England) James Graham (2019)

=== Samoa ===
- (Samoa) Tim Lafai (2019)
- (Samoa) Luciano Leilua (2019)

== State Of Origin ==
=== New South Wales ===
- (New South Wales) Anthony Mundine (1999)
- (New South Wales) Jamie Ainscough (2000–01)
- (New South Wales) Shaun Timmins (2000, 2002–04)
- (New South Wales) Trent Barrett (2001–02, 2004–05)
- (New South Wales) Jason Ryles (2002–05)
- (New South Wales) Luke Bailey (2002–03, 2005–06)
- (New South Wales) Mark Gasnier (2004–06, 2008)
- (New South Wales) Matt Cooper (2004–08, 2010)
- (New South Wales) Ben Hornby (2004, 2006, 2008)
- (New South Wales) Brent Kite (2004)
- (New South Wales) Ben Creagh (2009–10)
- (New South Wales) Michael Weyman (2009–10)
- (New South Wales) Justin Poore (2009)
- (New South Wales) Brett Morris (2010–14)
- (New South Wales) Beau Scott (2010–12)
- (New South Wales) Trent Merrin (2011–15)
- (New South Wales) Jamie Soward (2011)
- (New South Wales) Dean Young (2011)
- (New South Wales) Josh Dugan (2013–15)
- (New South Wales) Tyson Frizell (2016–2020)
- (New South Wales) Jack de Belin (2018)
- (New South Wales) Paul Vaughan (2018–2019)
- (New South Wales) Tariq Sims (2018–19, 2021–22)
- (New South Wales) Zac Lomax (2024)

=== Queensland ===
- (Queensland) Darius Boyd (2009–11)
- (Queensland) Neville Costigan (2009–10)
- (Queensland) Ben Hunt (2018–24)
- (Queensland) Corey Norman (2019)
- (Queensland) Andrew McCullough (2021)
- (Queensland) Jaydn Su'a (2024)
- (Queensland) Valentine Holmes (2025)

== All Stars Game ==
=== Indigenous All Stars ===
- Jamie Soward (2010–11)
- Wendell Sailor (2010)
- George Rose (2015)
- Josh Kerr (2019–23)
- Tyrell Fuimaono (2020–23)
- Tyrell Sloan (2022–23)

=== NRL All Stars ===
- (Australia) Matt Cooper (2010)
- (Australia) Brett Morris (2011, 2013)
- (Australia) Nathan Fien (2012)
- (Australia) Jason Nightingale (2012)
- (Australia) Trent Merrin (2015)

=== Maori All Stars ===
- (Māori people) Issac Luke (2020)
- (Māori people) Zane Musgrove (2023)

== City Vs Country Origin ==
=== NSW City ===
- (New South Wales) Mark Gasnier (2001, 2003)
- (New South Wales) Lance Thompson (2001, 2003–04)
- (New South Wales) Adam Cuthbertson (2011)
- (New South Wales) Jake Marketo (2017)
- (New South Wales) Cameron McInnes (2017)
- (New South Wales) Hame Sele (2017)

=== NSW Country ===
- (New South Wales) Nathan Blacklock (2001, 2004)
- (New South Wales) Jason Ryles (2001, 2003, 2005)
- (New South Wales) Luke Bailey (2002, 2005)
- (New South Wales) Shaun Timmins (2003)
- (New South Wales) Trent Barrett (2003, 2005)
- (New South Wales) Matt Cooper (2003–04)
- (New South Wales) Brent Kite (2004)
- (New South Wales) Ben Creagh (2005–07, 2009–10)
- (New South Wales) Ben Hornby (2005–06, 2008)
- (New South Wales) Josh Morris (2007)
- (New South Wales) Michael Weyman (2009)
- (New South Wales) Justin Poore (2009)
- (New South Wales) Jamie Soward (2009, 2011)
- (New South Wales) Beau Scott (2009)
- (New South Wales) Dean Young (2010)
- (New South Wales) Dan Hunt (2011)
- (New South Wales) Trent Merrin (2011–13)
- (New South Wales) Matt Prior (2011)
- (New South Wales) Brett Morris (2012)
- (New South Wales) Mitch Rein (2014–15)
- (New South Wales) Tyson Frizell (2015–16)
- (New South Wales) Joel Thompson (2015)
- (New South Wales) Euan Aitken (2016)
- (New South Wales) Jack De Belin (2016–17)
- (New South Wales) Tariq Sims (2017)
- (New South Wales) Paul Vaughan (2017)

== Other honours ==
=== Prime Minister's XIII ===
- (Australia) Matt Cooper (2005)
- (Australia) Luke Priddis (2005)
- (Australia) Ben Creagh (2005)
- (Australia) Mark Gasnier (2007)
- (Australia) Josh Morris (2008)
- (Australia) Dan Hunt (2012)
- (Australia) Brett Morris (2013)
- (Australia) Euan Aitken (2015)
- (Australia) Trent Merrin (2015)
- (Australia) Josh Dugan (2016–17)
- (Australia) Tyson Frizell (2016–19)
- (Australia) Paul Vaughan (2017)
- (Australia) Zac Lomax (2018)
- (Australia) Ben Hunt (2018–19)
- (Australia) Reece Robson (2018)
- (Australia) Zac Lomax (2022–23)
- (Australia) Ben Hunt (2022–23)
- (Australia) Michael Molo (2023)
- (Australia) Tyrell Sloan (2023)
- (Australia) Jacob Liddle (2024)
- (Australia) Kyle Flanagan (2025)
- (Australia) Ryan Couchman (2026)
- (Australia) Toby Couchman (2026)
- (Australia) Josh Kerr (2026)
- (Australia) Hamish Stewart (2026)

=== Indigenous Dreamtime Team ===
- Jamie Soward (2008)

=== All Golds ===
- (New Zealand) Chase Stanley (2007)

=== New Zealand Māori ===
- (Māori people) Chase Stanley (2008)
- (Māori people) Jason Nightingale (2008)
- (Māori people) Ben Ellis (2008)
- (Māori people) Rangi Chase (2008)

== Representative Captains ==
=== Other honours ===
==== Prime Minister's XIII ====
- (Australia) Mark Gasnier (2007)
- (Australia) Trent Merrin (2015)

New Zealand Māori

- (New Zealand) Ben Ellis (2008)

== Representative Coaching Staff ==
=== All Stars Game ===
NRL All Stars

- (Australia) Wayne Bennett
