= Justin Poore =

Australian rugby league footballer

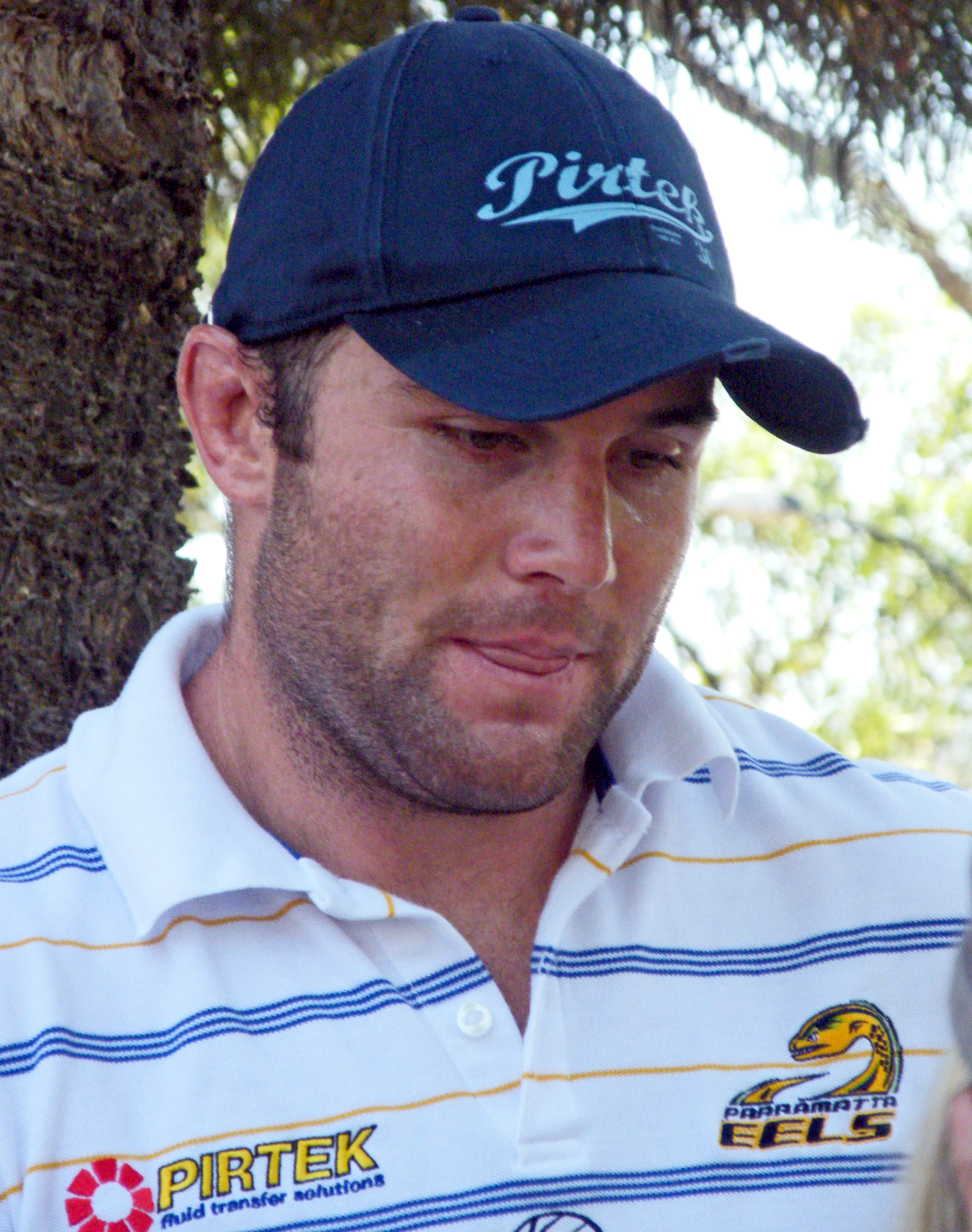

Personal information
- Born: 26 January 1985 (age 41) Perth, Western Australia, Australia

Playing information
- Height: 188 cm (6 ft 2 in)
- Weight: 108 kg (17 st 0 lb)
- Position: Prop
Club
Years	Team	Pld	T	G	FG	P
2004–09	St. George Illawarra	128	5	0	0	20
2010–12	Parramatta Eels	50	1	0	0	4
2013	Wakefield Trinity Wildcats	24	2	0	0	8
2014	Hull Kingston Rovers	7	0	0	0	0
	Total	209	8	0	0	32
Representative
Years	Team	Pld	T	G	FG	P
2009	NSW Country	1	0	0	0	0
2009	New South Wales	3	0	0	0	0

Justin Poore (born 26 January 1985) is an Australian former professional rugby league footballer. A New South Wales State of Origin representative forward, he played in Australia's NRL for the St. George Illawarra Dragons and Parramatta Eels before moving to England to play for the Wakefield Trinity Wildcats and Hull Kingston Rovers in the Super League.

== Background ==
Born in Perth, Western Australia, While attending Endeavour Sports High School in 2002, Poore was selected to play for the Australian Schoolboys team. Poore played his junior football for the Helensburgh Tigers before being signed by the St. George Illawarra Dragons.

== Professional playing career ==
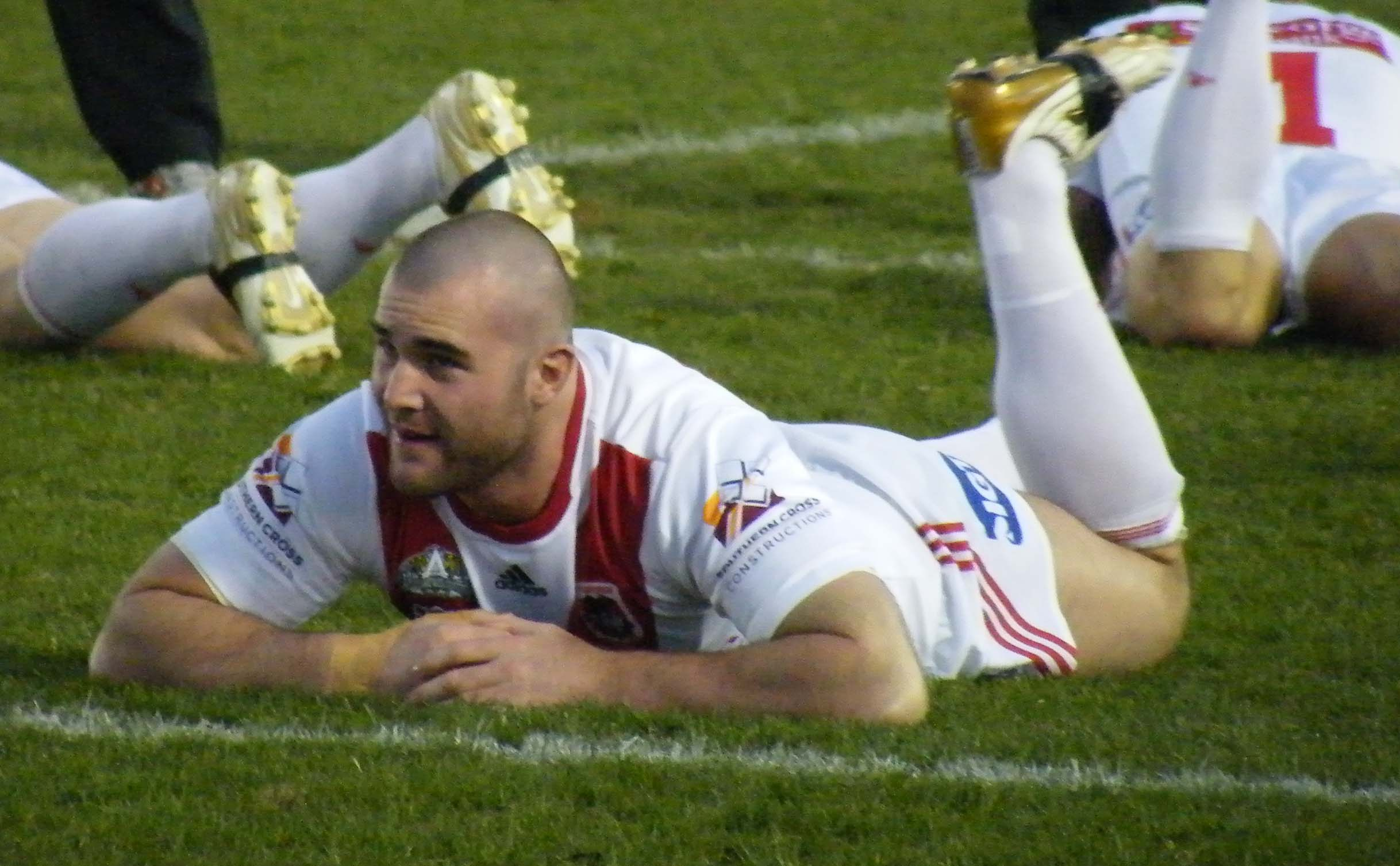
Poore warming up for the Dragons

=== St. George Illawarra Dragons ===
In round 1 of the 2004 NRL season Poore made his premiership début for St. George Illawarra against the Canberra Raiders. In August 2008, Poore was named in the 46-man Kangaroos preliminary squad for the 2008 Rugby League World Cup. After the 2008 NRL season, Poore and a group of NRL players led by former first-grader and ABC commentator Paul Osborne travelled to Rwanda on behalf of the Hope Rwanda charity, where they helped build 60 cement-rendered homes and a community hall. Poore planned to raise more money for the charity and travel to Rwanda again after the 2009 season.

In May 2009, Poore was selected for Country in the annual City vs Country match. In May 2009, Poore was named to make his Origin début for New South Wales in the opening match of the 2009 State of Origin series in Melbourne, Victoria. He was one of only four New South Wales players who played in all 3 games of the 2009 series, the others being Jarryd Hayne, Kurt Gidley and Ben Creagh.

Poore made 21 appearances for St. George in his final season at the club as they won the 2009 Minor Premiership but crashed out of the finals after losing both games against Parramatta and the Brisbane Broncos. Poore played 128 games in total for St. George before signing a three-year contract with the Parramatta Eels starting in 2010.

=== Parramatta Eels ===
At the start of the 2010 NRL season, Poore was one of Parramatta's high-profile recruits who was expected to bolster the club's forward pack. Poore made a total of 23 appearances for the club in 2010 as they missed out on the finals after finishing a disappointing 12th.

Poore was forced to sit out for the majority of the 2011 NRL season due to a knee injury. He returned in round 22 against South Sydney which ended in a 56–6 loss at ANZ Stadium. Parramatta narrowly avoided the wooden spoon that year and defeated the Gold Coast in the final game of the season to avoid finishing last.

In the 2012 NRL season, Poore and Parramatta endured a horror season as the club finished last on the table for the first time since 1972. At the end of 2012, Poore was released by the club.

=== Wakefield Trinity Wildcats ===
In October 2012, Poore signed a two-year contract with the Wakefield Trinity Wildcats of the Super League starting in 2013.

Poore signed a two-year deal with Hull Kingston Rovers in October 2013.

=== Hull Kingston Rovers ===
Poore commenced playing with Hull KR in the 2014 Super League season. He retired at the end of the season due to a knee injury.
