= Dan Hunt (disambiguation) =

Dan or Daniel Hunt may refer to

- Dan Hunt, Australian rugby league player for the St. George Illawarra Dragons
- Dan Hunt (American football), head football coach at Colgate University
- Daniel Hunt, English musician, songwriter, and producer
- Daniel Hunt, Australian musician, drummer in The View (c.2005-2011)
- Daniel J. Hunt, American politician in Massachusetts
