= Steve Morris (rugby league) =

Australia international rugby league footballer

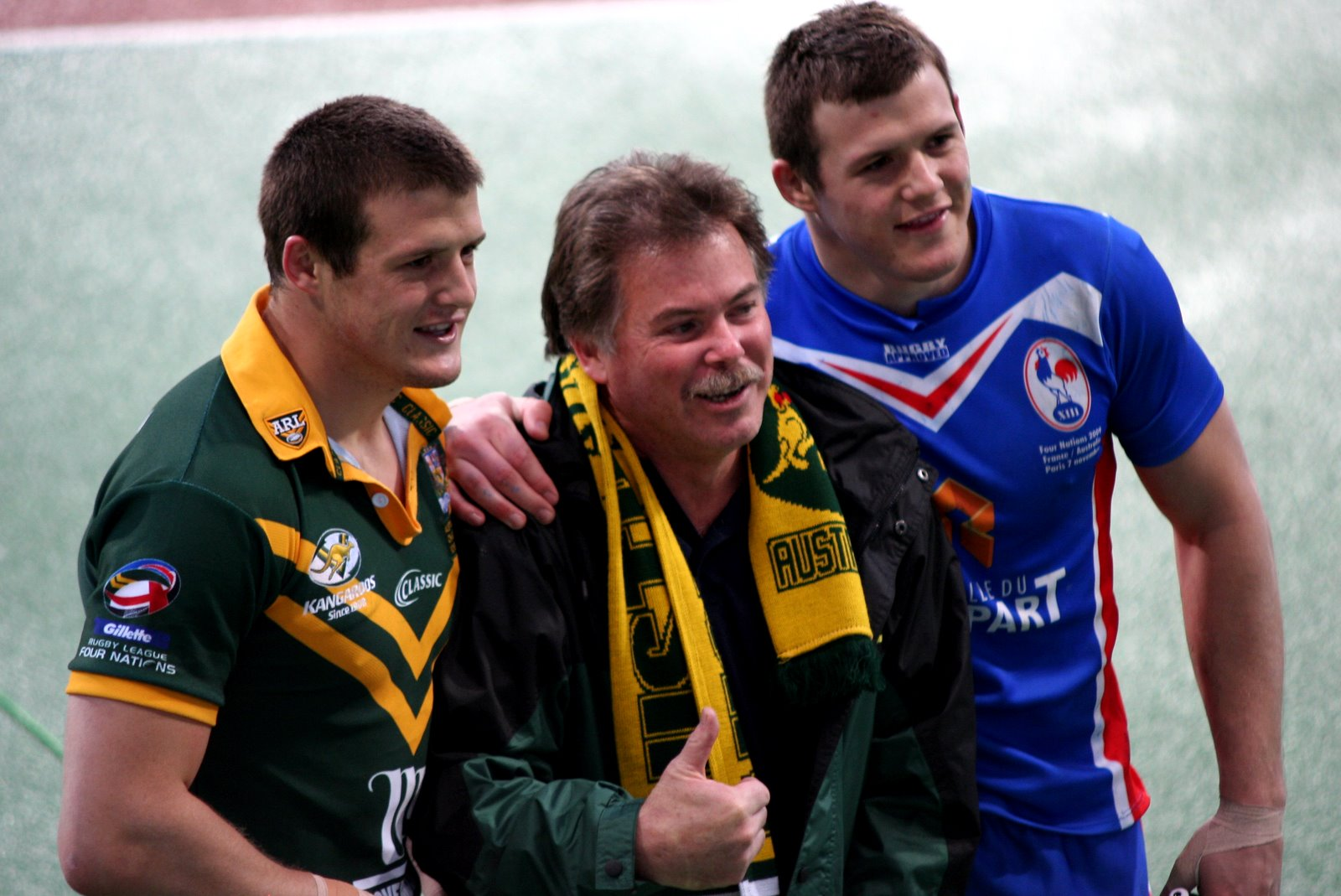
- Steve Morris (centre) with sons Josh and Brett

Personal information
- Full name: Steve Wayne Morris
- Born: 19 June 1957 (age 69) Wollongong, New South Wales, Australia

Playing information
- Height: 173 cm (5 ft 8 in)
- Weight: 75 kg (11 st 11 lb)
- Position: Halfback, Wing
Club
Years	Team	Pld	T	G	FG	P
1978	Dapto Canaries
1979–86	St. George Dragons	180	102	1	0	359
1987–90	Eastern Suburbs	67	20	0	0	80
1987–88	Leeds	19	10	0	0	40
	Total	266	132	1	0	479
Representative
Years	Team	Pld	T	G	FG	P
1978–86	New South Wales	5	1	0	0	3
1978	Australia	1	0	0	0	0
1986	NSW City	1	0	0	0	0
- Source: NRL Stats
- Relatives: Brett Morris (son); Josh Morris (son)

Steve 'Slippery' Morris (born 19 June 1957) is an Australian former rugby league footballer who played in the 1970s and 1980s. A state and national representative, his club career was played with the St. George Dragons and the Eastern Suburbs Roosters.

== Career ==
Initially a halfback, Morris came to selectors' attention when playing for the Dapto club. In the 1978 season he gained selection in the New South Wales Country Rugby League side and was then chosen to represent New South Wales and Australia. As of 2025 he is the last player to have represented Australia while still playing in the country rugby league competitions.

=== St. George Dragons ===
In season 1979 Morris joined the St George club and won a premiership in his début year in the Sydney top grade. In the 1979 Grand Final he took out the Best Player award, the Dave Brown Medal (now known as the Clive Churchill Medal).

In 1984, under Dragons coach Roy Masters, the speedy halfback made a very successful transition to the Wing position, that season he was awarded the 'Dally M' medal for winger of the year. He was the NSW Rugby Football League's top try scorer in 1984. He also played wing for St. George Dragons in the 1985 Grand Final.

In all, Morris played 180 games for the Dragons over eight years at the club and whilst he did not represent for Australia again he made further appearances for the New South Wales Blues under the State of Origin selection criteria on the wing in game III of 1984, and game I of 1986.

=== Eastern Suburbs ===
In 1987, he moved to the Eastern Suburbs club playing 58 matches over two seasons and winning a third "Dally M Winger of the Year" award. During the Australian off-season Morris enjoyed a successful stint at English club, Leeds. Morris played on the wing in Leeds' 14–15 defeat by St. Helens in the 1987–88 John Player Special Trophy Final during the 1987–88 season at Central Park, Wigan on Saturday 9 January 1988. Morris retired from the game in 1990.

== Personal life ==
His twin sons Brett and Josh Morris also played in the National Rugby League (NRL).

He currently teaches physical education at Bomaderry High School on the South Coast.

== Sources ==
- Whiticker, Alan & Hudson, Glen (2006) The Encyclopedia of Rugby League Players, Gavin Allen Publishing, Sydney
- Andrews, Malcolm (2006) The ABC of Rugby League Austn Broadcasting Corpn, Sydney
