= Jarryd Hayne =

Australian rugby player (born 1988)

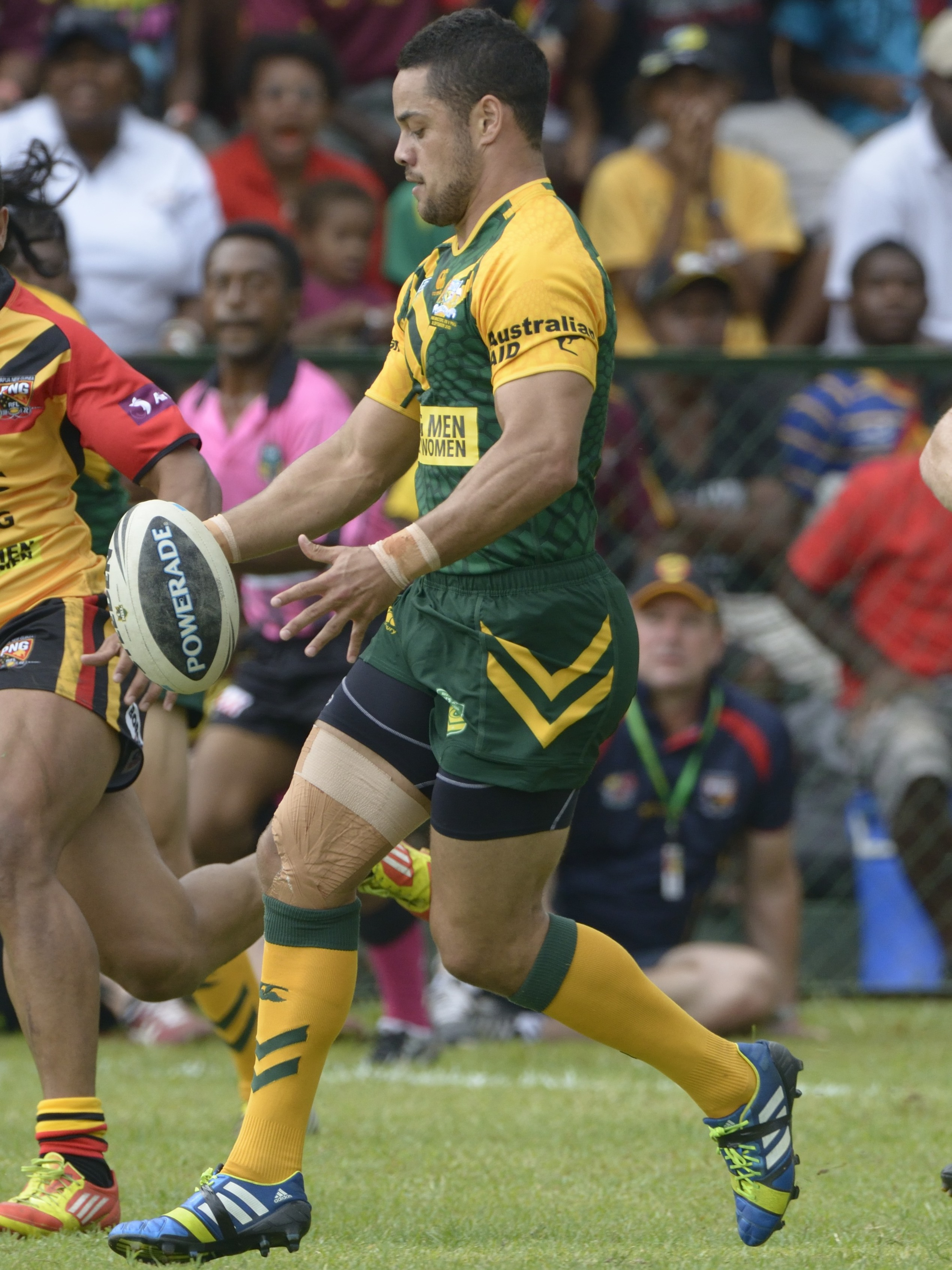

Personal information
- Full name: Jarryd Lee Hayne
- Born: 15 February 1988 (age 38) Minto, New South Wales, Australia

Playing information

Rugby league
- Position: Fullback, Wing, Centre, Five-eighth
Club
Years	Team	Pld	T	G	FG	P
2006–14	Parramatta Eels	176	103	2	3	419
2016–17	Gold Coast Titans	23	8	0	1	33
2018	Parramatta Eels	15	10	0	0	40
	Total	214	121	2	4	492
Representative
Years	Team	Pld	T	G	FG	P
2006–13	Prime Minister's XIII	3	6	0	0	24
2007–12	City NSW	5	3	0	0	12
2007–17	New South Wales	23	11	0	0	44
2007–13	Australia	11	11	0	0	44
2008–18	Fiji	10	5	0	0	20
2010–13	NRL All Stars	2	1	0	0	4

Rugby union
Representative
Years	Team	Pld	T	G	FG	P
2016	Fiji 7s (Sevens)	5	0	0	0	0
- Source: As of 22 December 2020
- Education: Westfields Sports High School
- Father: Manoa Thompson

Jarryd Lee Hayne (born 1988) is an Australian semi-professional rugby league footballer who plays for Wentworthville Magpies in the Ron Massey Cup. He briefly moved to the US to play the running back position for San Francisco 49ers in the 2015 NFL season. In 2016 he represented Fiji 7s in rugby union sevens.

Hayne began his career in 2006 as a winger for the Parramatta Eels, winning the NRL's Dally M Rookie of the Year award. The following year, he made his debut for New South Wales in State of Origin and Australia internationally, and began playing primarily as a fullback. Hayne won the Dally M Medal in 2009 and 2014 as the league's player of the year, and the Rugby League International Federation's International Player of the Year award in 2009. He represented Australia at the 2013 Rugby League World Cup, and his father's native Fiji at the 2008 and 2017 tournaments when not selected for Australia.

Hayne attracted significant attention when he made the switch from one of the NRL's top players to a rookie with the San Francisco 49ers in the 2015 NFL season. At the end of the season, Hayne ended his NFL career. In 2016, he represented Fiji 7s in rugby union sevens, but after not being selected for the 2016 Olympic squad, he returned to the NRL with the Gold Coast Titans before a final season with Parramatta in 2018.

== Background ==
Hayne was born in Sydney, New South Wales, Australia, in 1988. He is the son of a Fijian father, Manoa Thompson, and an Australian mother, Jodie Hayne. His father played professional rugby league for South Sydney, Western Suburbs and the Auckland Warriors while also representing Fiji. Hayne was one of three children raised by his single mother, and grew up in a Campbelltown housing-commission house in Minto, New South Wales.

In early life, Hayne took up athletics winning multiple titles. He still holds the under 8- and under 9-year-old Public School Sports Association (PSSA) 100 metre records. He competed in Little Athletics until under 15 age group.

Hayne attended school at John Warby Public School, Leumeah High and Westfields Sports High School but dropped out of high school early to pursue a career in rugby league.

== Rugby league career ==
Hayne began playing junior rugby league for Campbelltown City, East Campbelltown and Cabramatta at the age of six.

=== 2000s ===
Hayne made his NRL debut with the Parramatta Eels at 18 years of age on 19 May 2006 against the Penrith Panthers at CUA Stadium. Jason Taylor, who was making his first grade coaching debut, chose him on the wing. Taylor later said, "Everyone knew his talent, it wasn't just me." Hayne quickly made an impression on the competition scoring 17 tries within 16 games in his debut season. This tally included a personal best of four tries in the Parramatta Eels' 46–12 victory over Newcastle Knights. His excellent try scoring ability saw him rewarded with the 2006 Dally M 'Rookie of the Year' award and a spot on the Kangaroos Squad. He was also named the 2006 Parramatta Eels season's rookie of the year.

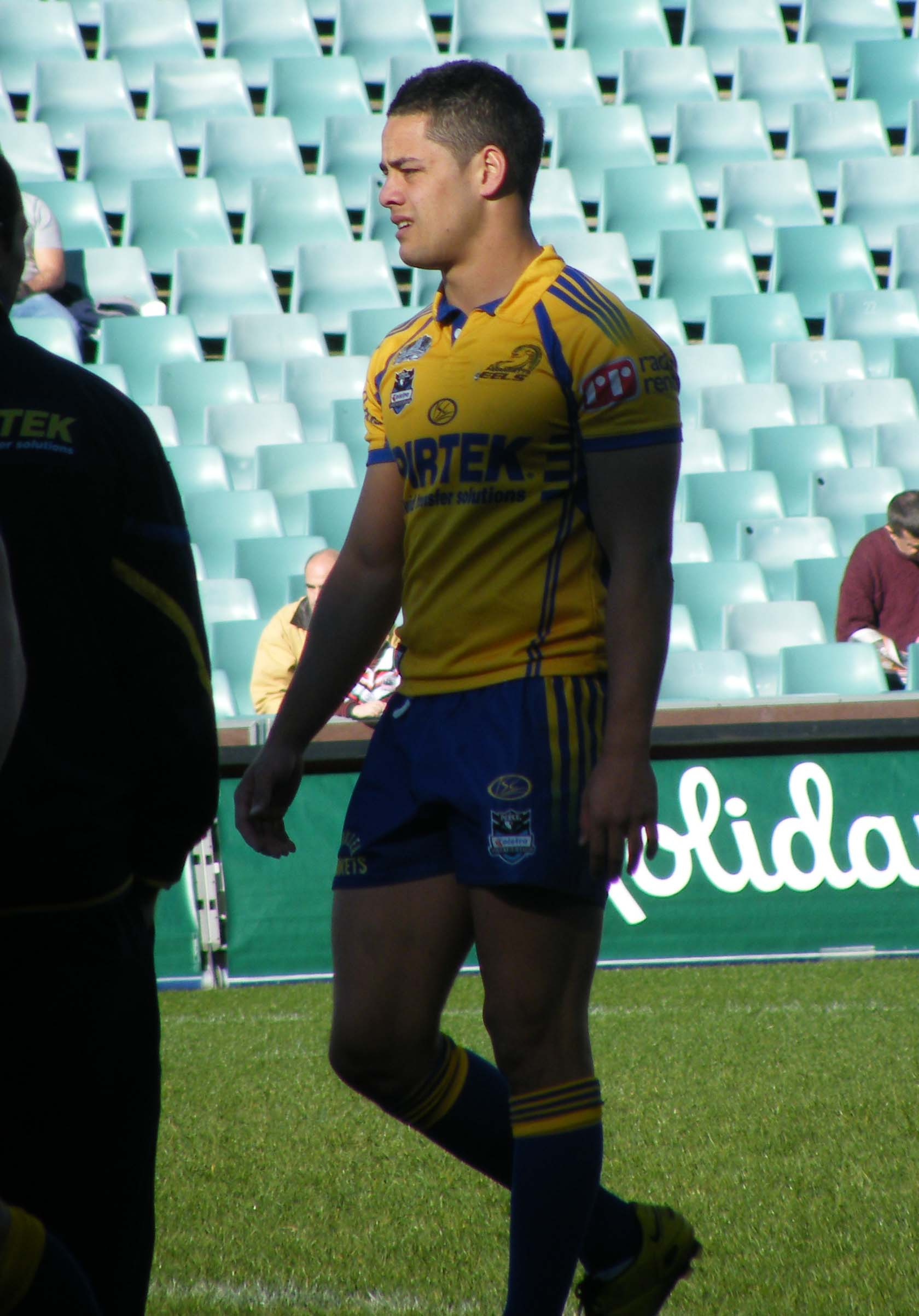
Hayne playing for Parramatta in 2008.

He started the season at centre but later moved to fullback due to an injury to Luke Burt and scored 12 tries, including the winning try against the New Zealand Warriors in the First Qualifying Final of the 2007 NRL Finals series. Following Parramatta's close victory against Brisbane in July 2007, Hayne was accused of diving to impede Brisbane's momentum after a heavy hit from Sam Thaiday. Then Brisbane coach Wayne Bennett said "You talk about ethics in our sport. You talk about not laying [sic] on the ground" and then claimed Hayne should be cited for "bringing the game into disrepute." Hayne denied that he dived to deliberately impede Brisbane's momentum and claimed that he was genuinely hurt after the collision with Thaiday. He was never found guilty of any wrongdoing by the NRL Judiciary. In the 2007 Grand Final qualifier, Hayne was again accused of diving when he stayed down and received a penalty for a high shot. Players also accused Hayne of winking after the incident, Clint Newton saying "To lay down like he did and then get up and wink, I don't think that's in the spirit of the game. Straight after he got up, he winked at Dallas Johnson – facing us." Hayne denied the accusations, saying, "I don't engage in that shit, I just score tries and make people happy".

Before the start of the 2008 season, Hayne was on a night out with St George player Mark Gasnier when a fight broke out between them and another group. Hayne and Gasnier were subsequently shot at by a gunman in a passing taxi. In the coming years, Hayne has said that the shooting incident changed his life and was a turning point in his career.

Parramatta announced Hayne had signed with the club for a $2M extension. On 15 September, he was officially announced as Rugby League's fastest man, after becoming the highest placed league player in the Gatorade Bolt, although other noted league speedsters such as David Mead, Michael Jennings, Brett Stewart and Kevin Gordon did not participate.

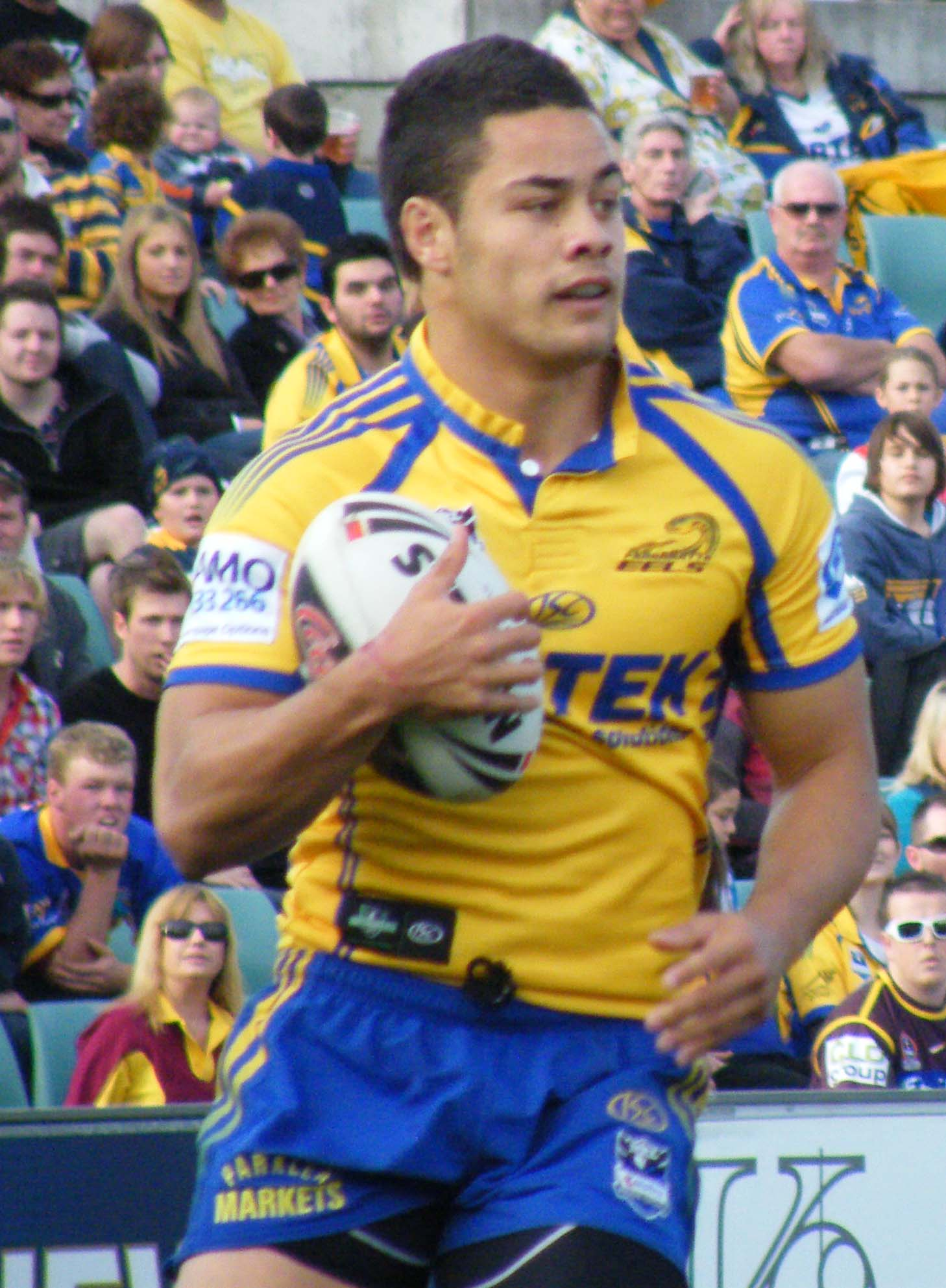
Hayne playing for Parramatta in 2009

At the start of the 2009 NRL season, Hayne played at five-eighth with very limited success. Hayne was moved back to his preferred position of fullback just before the round 8 clash with the North Queensland Cowboys. His return to form at fullback prompted Dean Ritchie of Daily Telegraph to call Hayne "the most gifted Parramatta player since the great Brett Kenny." Hayne's performances for Parramatta stepped up to another level as the 2009 season progressed. His influence on the game from fullback was lauded by many pundits as the Eels made a late season surge. From Round 19 to Round 24, he won six consecutive Man of the Match awards. He was described as "the best player in any code of football in Australia" by Phil Gould. Hayne has won the Dally M Medals for Player of the Year and Fullback of the Year respectively. He became one of the youngest winners of the prestigious award and only the second fullback in history to be crowned Dally M Player of the Year. Hayne escaped a grade two charge after coming into contact with the head of Bryson Goodwin, sliding in with his knees to stop Goodwin in the act of scoring a try during the Preliminary Final against the Canterbury-Bankstown Bulldogs. Hayne pleaded guilty to a grade one charge, however a grade two charge would have resulted in Hayne missing the 2009 NRL Grand Final. Hayne ran 4,429 metres with the ball in 2009, more than any other player in the competition. In 2009, Hayne was the Dally M Medal winner, Dally M fullback of the year, NSW State of Origin player of the series, International Federation player of the year, Parramatta player of the season, Fiji Bati player of the year and Rugby League Week player of the year.

Hayne's performance for the Parramatta Eels in the 2009 grand final against the Melbourne Storm was largely viewed in Australian and New Zealand media as disappointing. Journalist Josh Massoud, writing for The Daily Telegraph wrote, "For reasons only known to the god he recently discovered, Eels superstar Hayne failed to contest the ball." Prior to the game the media focused much on Hayne's match-up with the Melbourne Storm fullback Billy Slater which was touted as "one of the most anticipated individual match-ups in Grand Final history". Phil Gould said "Hayne was just shut out of the game, his performance wasn't actually that bad".

Hayne's 2009 season has since been described as one of the greatest individual seasons in Australian rugby league history. Such was the euphoria surrounding Parramatta's run to the 2009 grand final that the then NSW Premier Nathan Rees pledged to name one of the new trains which were due to be rolled out next year on The Sydney network "The Hayne Train" if Parramatta were to have won the match. The train was to be painted blue and gold and run on the western line.

=== 2010s ===
For the 2010 ANZAC Test, Hayne was selected to play for Australia on the wing in their victory against New Zealand.

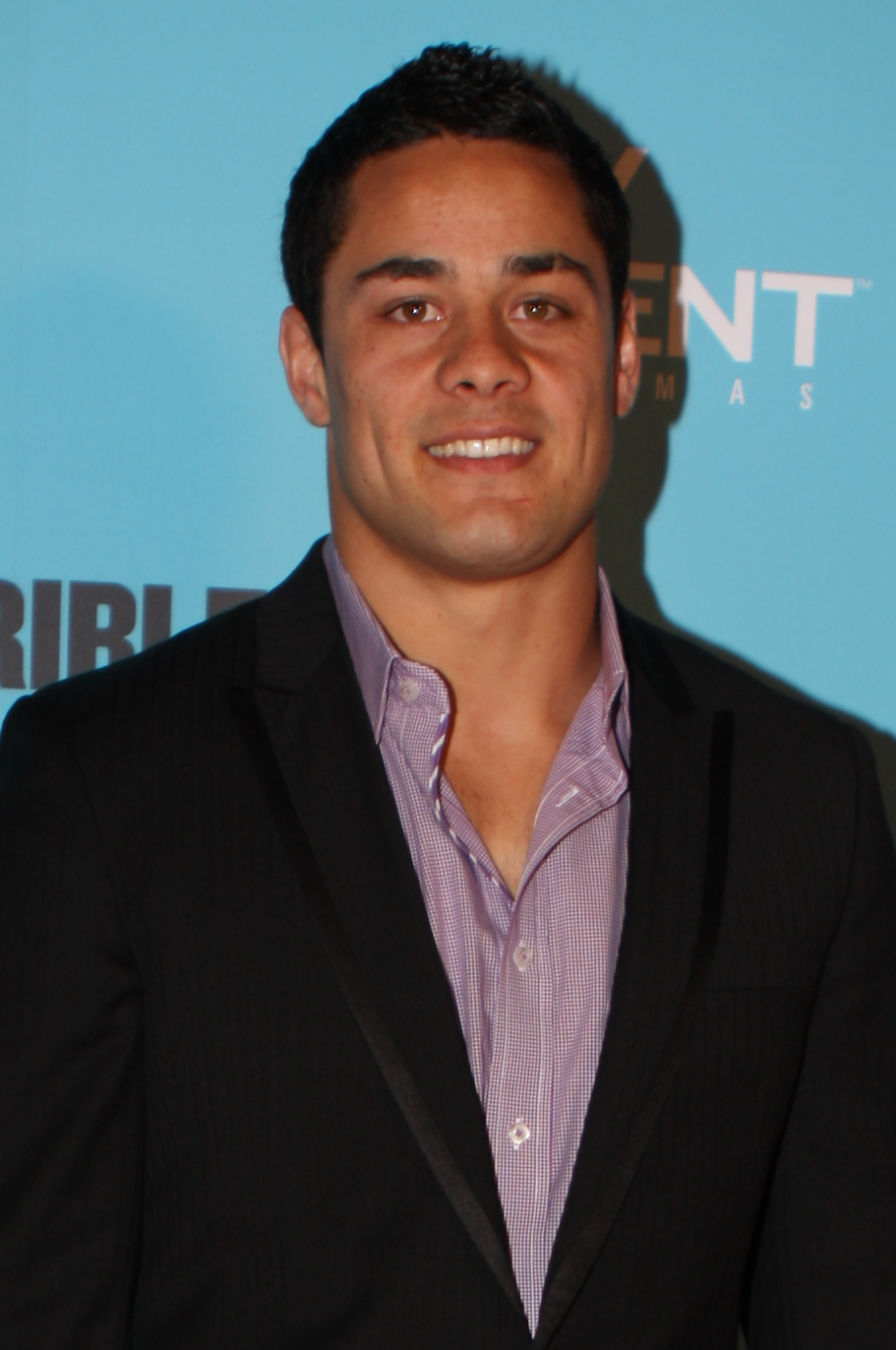
Hayne at the premiere for Horrible Bosses in 2011

Being named as co-captain of Parramatta in 2013, Hayne has had an impressive season, particularly with regards to his goal line defence. This earned him a call up for New South Wales in the first game of the 2013 Origin Series at his preferred position of fullback after incumbent Brett Stewart was injured. Hayne scored the first try of the series for NSW and was instrumental once again in their only victory of the series.

In 2014 Hayne started the season with his most consistent display of rugby league, leading the Dally M medal rankings after 10 Rounds. He was selected for New South Wales in his favoured fullback position for Game One of the 2014 State of Origin series. He produced a man of the match performance, setting up one try and scoring one to deliver New South Wales a 12–8 win in Brisbane and a 1–0 series lead. During the annual 2014 players poll, where 100 players from the 16 clubs are interviewed, Hayne was voted as 'best in the game,' the first NSW player since Andrew Johns won the honour in 2006. In Round 22 of the season, playing against the Canberra Raiders, Hayne scored another 50m solo try to bring up his 100th career try. He became only the third player behind Luke Burt and Brett Kenny to score 100 tries for Parramatta. In Round 23 of the season Hayne topped his 2006 try scoring effort, reaching his 18th for the season against the Bulldogs. Hayne finished the season as the NRL's second-highest try-scorer with 20 for the season. On 29 September 2014, on the Dally M Awards night, Hayne and North Queensland Queensland Cowboys captain Johnathan Thurston were the joint winners of the 2014 Dally M Player of the Year Award after the most thrilling countdown in the award's history. For Hayne, it is his second Dally M Player of the Year award following his win in 2009 and also claimed the Fullback of the Year and Best Representative Player awards, respectively.

==== Return to league ====
On 2 August 2016, after his time in American football and rugby sevens, it was announced that Hayne would be returning to the NRL, signing a two-year contract with the Gold Coast Titans. His contract was touted to be as worth as much as $1.2 million a season, the most any NRL player has been paid in one year. Hayne made himself available for immediate selection and made his debut for the Titans against the New Zealand Warriors on 7 August 2016. In Round 22, in his second game back, Hayne kicked the match-winning field goal in the Titans' 19–18 victory over the Wests Tigers. The win catapulted the Titans into a rare finals berth against Brisbane, resulting in a 44–28 loss in week one of the finals.

In the 2017 NRL season, Hayne was involved in a long running player-coach feud with Gold Coast coach Neil Henry. In an interview, Hayne declared he was willing to walk away from the club if Henry does not want him. He claimed the coach had stopped talking to him. After months of media speculation and poor performances on the field by Hayne and the rest of the Gold Coast side the board had an emergency meeting to discuss the future of Hayne and Henry. On 20 August 2017, the board decided to terminate Henry effective immediately. Later in the year on 30 November, just 16 months and winning just eight of 23 matches, the Gold Coast granted Hayne a release from the final year of his contract. On 1 December 2017, Hayne joined his old club, the Parramatta Eels, announcing it will be a one-year deal.

On 11 March 2018, Hayne played his 200th NRL game in his first game back for Parramatta in a 24–14 loss. In round 3 against Cronulla, Hayne was taken off the field after 30 minutes with a hip injury that ruled him out for the next four-weeks. Hayne returned in Round 7 against Manly but was taken off the field just 10 minutes into the match after re-injuring his hip. In April 2018, Parramatta went on to win their first game of the season 44–10. On 9 June 2018, Hayne returned to the starting side and scored two tries for Parramatta in their 20–14 victory over North Queensland. On 11 August 2018, Hayne scored a hat-trick in Parramatta's 40–4 victory over St George.

Hayne finished 2018 with a club best 10 tries from 15 appearances, as well as topping the Parramatta charts for line breaks and tackle busts. Parramatta finished 2018 with their third wooden spoon in just seven seasons. And although he went public with his ambition to re-sign with the Parramatta club, they resisted in making him an offer due to allegations of sexual assault. He would never play another NRL game again.

On 21 August 2019, Hayne was voted as one of the best players of the decade in the NRL team of the decade announcement which spanned from the 2010 to 2019 seasons. Premiership-winning coaches Phil Gould, Craig Bellamy, Trent Robinson and Ricky Stuart were also part of the panel along with Hall of Famers Peter Sterling, Darren Lockyer, Danny Buderus and Laurie Daley.

=== 2020s ===
On 1 February 2025, it was announced that Hayne had signed with Wentworthville Magpies in the Ron Massey Cup. He played his first match for the club on 11 May 2025, defeating Canterbury-Bankstown Bulldogs 22–14.

=== Representative rugby league ===
==== Debut ====
Hayne made his representative rugby league debut for the Australian Prime Minister's XIII on 30 September 2006 against Papua New Guinea at Lloyd Robson Oval in Port Moresby. He would be the top try scorer in his team's 28–8 victory. On 3 May 2007, Hayne was selected to make his debut on the wing for the City New South Wales team in the City vs Country Origin clash in Coffs Harbour. He impressed enough in his City debut to secure a place in the New South Wales state team for the 2007 State of Origin Game I on 23 May 2007 at Suncorp Stadium in Brisbane. He would go on to represent New South Wales in each of the three state games in 2007, scoring two tries in the process. On 21 October 2007, Hayne made his international debut for Australia in the Trans-Tasman Test against New Zealand at Westpac Stadium in Wellington. He scored a solo try on debut in Australia's record 58–0 victory.

==== New South Wales ====
After competing in each of the three State of Origin matches for New South Wales in 2007, Hayne was selected for NSW in two of the three games in 2008 and only missed Game II through suspension. In 2010, Hayne was named and played for the NSW Blues in all three losing matches in the 2010 State of Origin series against the Queensland Maroons.

In 2011, Hayne was controversially not named in the NSW Blues side for Game 1, which they lost. However, he returned to the side in Game Two, helping them win 18 – 8. He also played in the deciding Game 3, this time in the centres. To the surprise of many, Hayne's long kicking ability was utilised by the Blues, in an effort to stop the ensuing Queensland attack. Despite losing, Hayne made two line breaks, and scored one try. He also had the second highest run metres for NSW (156m) behind Paul Gallen (160m). He is likely to have played on the wing for Australia following the 2011 season, but was not selected due to injury.

Hayne was selected to play on the wing for New South Wales in all three games of the 2012 State of Origin series which was again won by Queensland. Hayne was moved to his preferred position of fullback for Game I of the 2013 State of Origin series and scored a try during New South Wales' 14–6 victory. A hamstring injury ruled Hayne out for the remainder of the series as New South Wales would again taste series defeat for the eighth straight year.

A determined Hayne returned to the fold for Game I of the 2014 State of Origin series and was selected a fullback for each of the three games. The Blues would finally secure a series victory in what would be Hayne's last State of Origin series before switching to American football. Hayne was awarded The Brad Fittler Medal for being NSW's best player in The 2014 series. One of the enduring moments in Origin history is when Hayne ran into the crowd after NSW won it first series in 9 years. In the post match interview with Andrew Johns, a visibly emotional Hayne said "Ooh, it's been a long time, it's been a long time. We fought hard. Whoah. Yes, son! Yes, son!".

Hayne was selected to play in The 2017 State of Origin series at Centre. In game one he starred for New South Wales on the field scoring a try in a convincing 28–4 victory over Queensland. In game two, Hayne scored a try in the first half as New South Wales raced out to a 16–6 lead. Just before half time, Hayne had the chance to put winger Brett Morris over for a try in the corner to make it 20–6 but decided to attempt the try himself but was tackled short of the goal line. This was seen as a turning point in the match as Queensland came back in the second half to win the game 18–16. Former Queensland coach Wayne Bennett said to the media that Hayne's decision not to pass the ball to Morris was Selfish and a Show boat move, he then said "For Jarryd Hayne, there's no excuses for why he didn't pass the ball to Morris",. Hayne kept his spot in the side for Game three where New South Wales lost to Queensland 22–6 at Suncorp Stadium.

==== 2008 World Cup ====
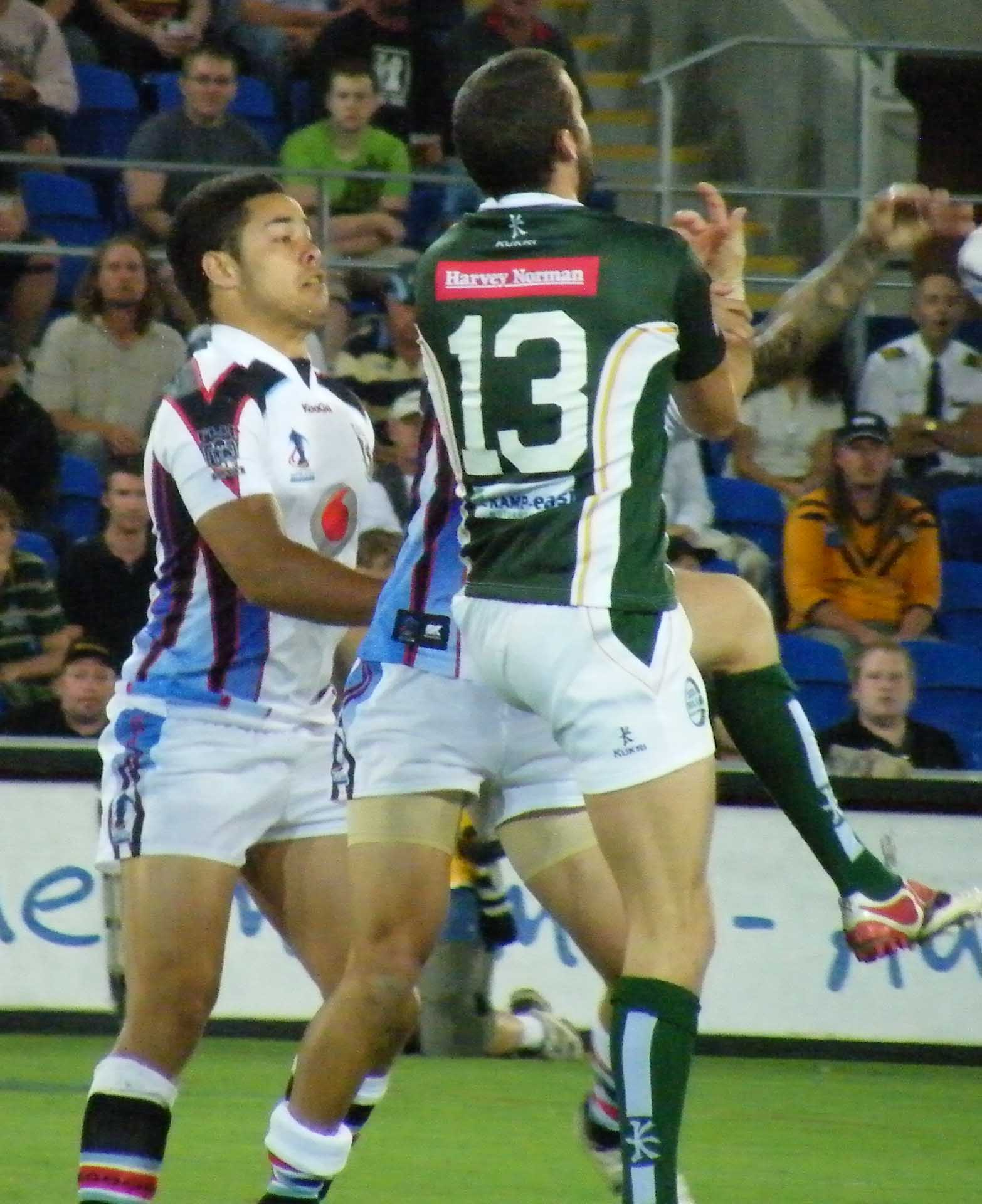
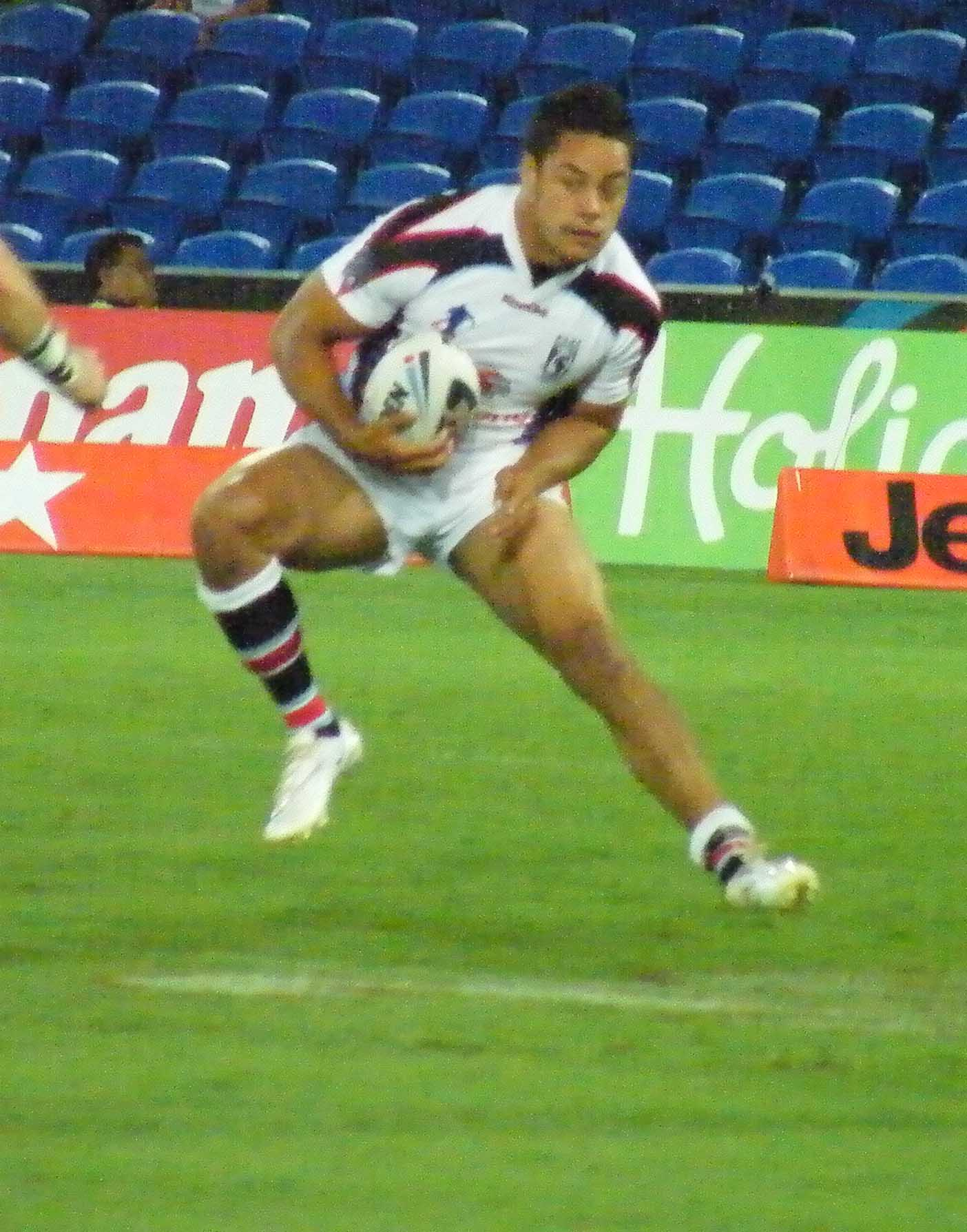
Hayne playing for Fiji in 2008.

Despite having already represented Australia, Hayne was selected to play for his father's native Fiji in the 2008 Rugby League World Cup. On 1 November 2008 he made his debut for the Fiji Bati against France at WIN Stadium in Wollongong and scored two tries. Fiji topped Group B and advanced to the semi-final qualifier against Ireland at Skilled Park on the Gold Coast. Hayne was instrumental in Fiji's 30–14 victory. Fiji then lost to Australia in the semi-final at Sydney Football Stadium. Hayne later said he found God during his 2008 World Cup experience with Fiji and believed his participation helped him become the best rugby league player in the world in 2009.

==== All Star selection ====
Hayne was voted by the public to play fullback for the NRL All Stars team in the inaugural 2010 All Stars match at Skilled Park. He was again voted as the starting fullback for the NRL All Stars team in the 2013 All Stars match at Suncorp Stadium in Brisbane and scored the only try for the NRL All Stars.

==== 2013 World Cup ====
Hayne was named at centre by Australian coach Tim Sheens for the Kangaroos' squad for the 2013 Rugby League World Cup, which was held in England, France, Wales and Ireland. He scored two tries against Ireland before becoming the sixth Australian to score four tries in a world cup match when he did so against the United States in Australia's 62–0 win. A week later Hayne scored three tries and set up two in Australia's 64–0 win over Fiji to make himself the competition's lead try scorer. Hayne continued his run of form in the Grand final against New Zealand, after almost being knocked unconscious inside the game's first five minutes. He went on to produce two remarkable try assists for winger Brett Morris as Australia were crowned 2013 world champions. He was named Australia's joint players-player alongside Johnathan Thurston. Hayne's world cup campaign was hailed by his Kangaroos teammates, Brett Morris declaring that "If there was a Harlem Globetrotters of rugby league, he'd be in it. To play outside him for the last couple of weeks is something I'll remember." By the end of the tournament Hayne was the equal top try scorer with teammate Brett Morris.

==== 2017 World Cup ====
Hayne again represented Fiji in the 2017 World Cup and the 2018 Pacific Rugby League Tests.

=== Rugby league career statistics ===
Seasons in which Hayne made the NRL Finals
Led the league/tournament

Club
Season	Team	Games	Tries	Goals	F/G	Points
2006	Parramatta	16	17	2	–	72
2007	Parramatta	25	12	–	–	48
2008	Parramatta	18	6	–	–	24
2009	Parramatta	26	14	–	1	57
2010	Parramatta	22	11	–	–	44
2011	Parramatta	21	7	–	1	29
2012	Parramatta	12	8	–	–	32
2013	Parramatta	15	8	–	1	33
2014	Parramatta	21	20	–	–	80
2016	Gold Coast	9	–	–	1	1
2017	Gold Coast	17	8	–	-	33
2018	Parramatta	15	10	–	-	40
Total		214	121	2	4	492

^{Last updated: 10 September 2018}

State
Season	Team	Games	Tries	Goals	F/G	Points
2007	New South Wales	3	2	–	–	8
2008	New South Wales	2	–	–	–	–
2009	New South Wales	3	3	–	–	12
2010	New South Wales	3	1	–	–	–
2011	New South Wales	2	1	–	–	8
2012	New South Wales	3	–	–	–	–
2013	New South Wales	1	1	–	–	4
2014	New South Wales	3	1	–	–	4
2017	New South Wales	3	2	–	–	8
Total		23	11	–	–	44

^{Last updated: 7 July 2018}

International
Season	Team	Games	Tries	Goals	F/G	Points
2007	Australia	1	1	–	–	4
2008	Fiji	4	3	–	–	12
2009	Australia	4	1	–	–	4
2010	Australia	1	–	–	–	–
2013	Australia	5	9	–	–	36
2017	Fiji	5	2	–	–	8
2018	Fiji	1	-	–	–	0
Total		21	16	–	–	64

^{Last updated: 7 July 2018}

All Star
Season	Team	Games	Tries	Goals	F/G	Points
2010	NRL All Stars	1	–	–	–	–
2013	NRL All Stars	1	1	–	–	4
Total		2	1	–	–	4

^{Last updated: 6 October 2014}

=== Awards and honours ===
==== Individual ====
- 2006: Dally M Rookie of the Year
- 2006: Parramatta Eels Rookie of the Year
- 2007: Dally M Winger of the Year
- 2007: New South Wales Player of the Year
- 2009: RLIF International Player of the Year
- 2009: Dally M Player of the Year
- 2009: Dally M Fullback of the Year
- 2009: New South Wales Player of the Year
- 2009: Parramatta Eels Player of the Year
- 2010: Parramatta Eels Player of the Year
- 2013: Rugby League World Cup Player's Player
- 2013: Rugby League World Cup Top Tryscorer
- 2014: Dally M Player of the Year
- 2014: Dally M Fullback of the Year
- 2014: Dally M Representative Player of the Year
- 2014: Dally M Top Tryscorer (20)
- 2014: New South Wales Player of the Year
- 2019: NRL team of the decade member 2010–2019.

==== Team ====
- 2009: NRL Grand Final – Parramatta Eels – Runners-Up
- 2009: Rugby League Four Nations – Australia – Winners
- 2013: Rugby League World Cup – Australia – Winners
- 2014: State of Origin series – New South Wales – Winners

=== Hayne Plane celebration ===
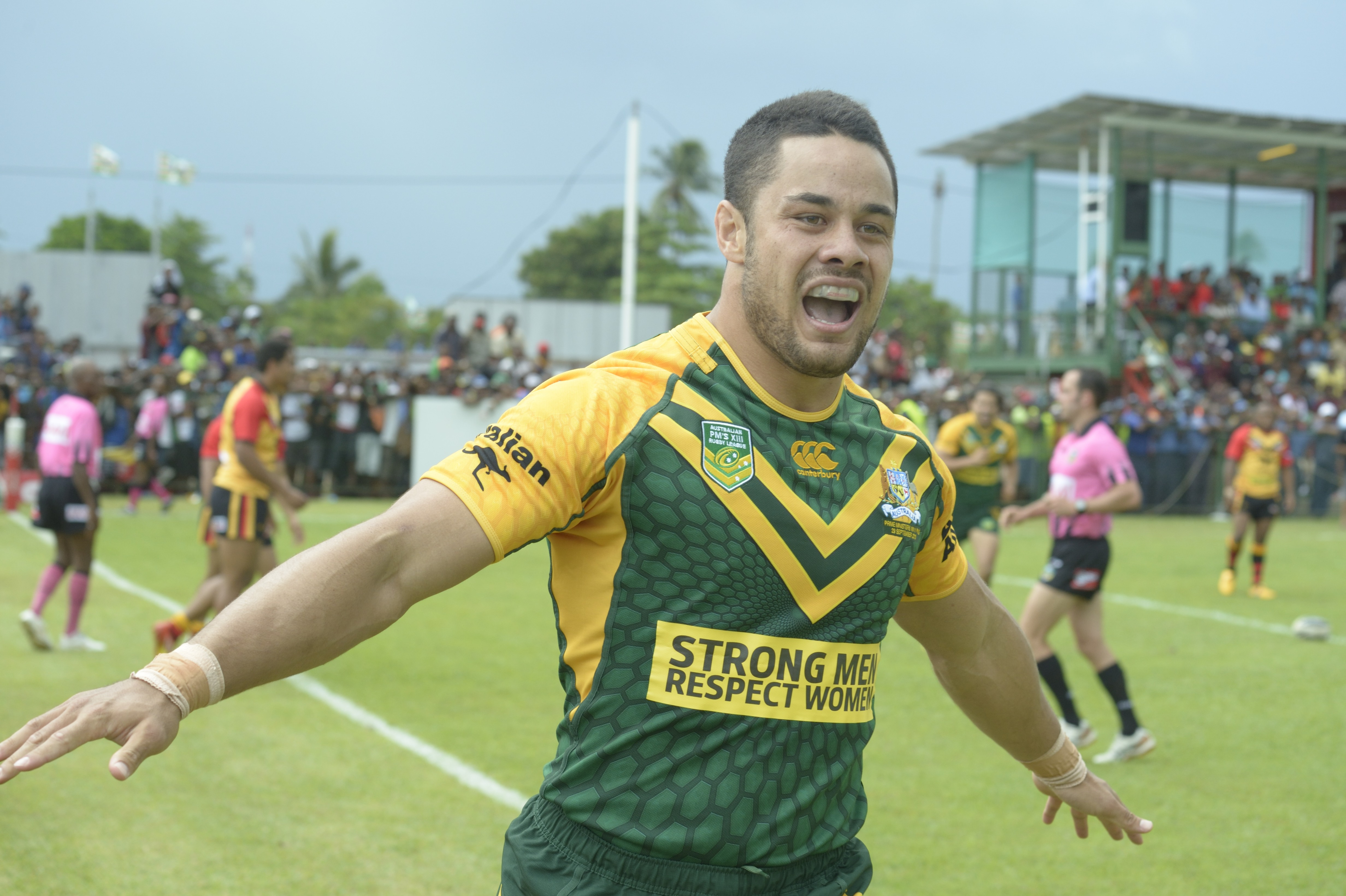
Hayne performing the Hayne Plane celebration while playing for the Australian Prime Minister's XIII in 2013.

In his rugby league career, Hayne is known for his post-try celebration nicknamed the 'Hayne Plane'. After scoring a try he would extend both arms to the side and replicate the wings of a plane.

== American football career ==
In 2009, it was reported that the new Greater Western Sydney franchise in the Australian Football League had offered Hayne a contract worth $1.5 million a season to quit rugby league and take up Australian rules football. On 17 December 2009, Hayne announced he would remain in the National Rugby League by re-signing with Parramatta for a further four years. The deal was reportedly worth $500,000 a season. Greater Western Sydney Giants CEO Dave Matthews later confirmed the club did approach Hayne about a code switch in 2009. He was also reportedly chased by several rugby union teams at the time.

In 2011, aged 23, Hayne intended to quit rugby league to pursue his dream of playing in the National Football League via the American collegiate system. However, his failure to complete 12th grade and receive his High School Certificate (HSC) meant Hayne was ineligible to play college football in the United States. In 2013, he organised two American football training sessions with college team UTS between the 2013 NRL season and the 2013 Rugby League World Cup. He also requested Gridiron Australia organise an open trial with an NFL franchise but his commitments to the Australian national rugby league team during the 2013 Rugby League World Cup prohibited him from attempting the sport switch at that time. In June 2014, NFL star and future 49ers teammate Reggie Bush viewed Hayne's rugby league highlights tape and commented "He actually looks like an NFL running back. Looks like he could come play with us tomorrow." On 15 October 2014, Hayne announced during a press conference that he would be departing rugby league in pursuit of a career in the NFL. Prior to his announcement, Hayne was reportedly in negotiations with Parramatta to sign a new five-year contract worth $1.35 million a season, which would equate to more than 20% of the NRL's 2015 salary cap of $6.55 million, which would have been the largest playing contract ever offered to an NRL player.

Jarryd Hayne
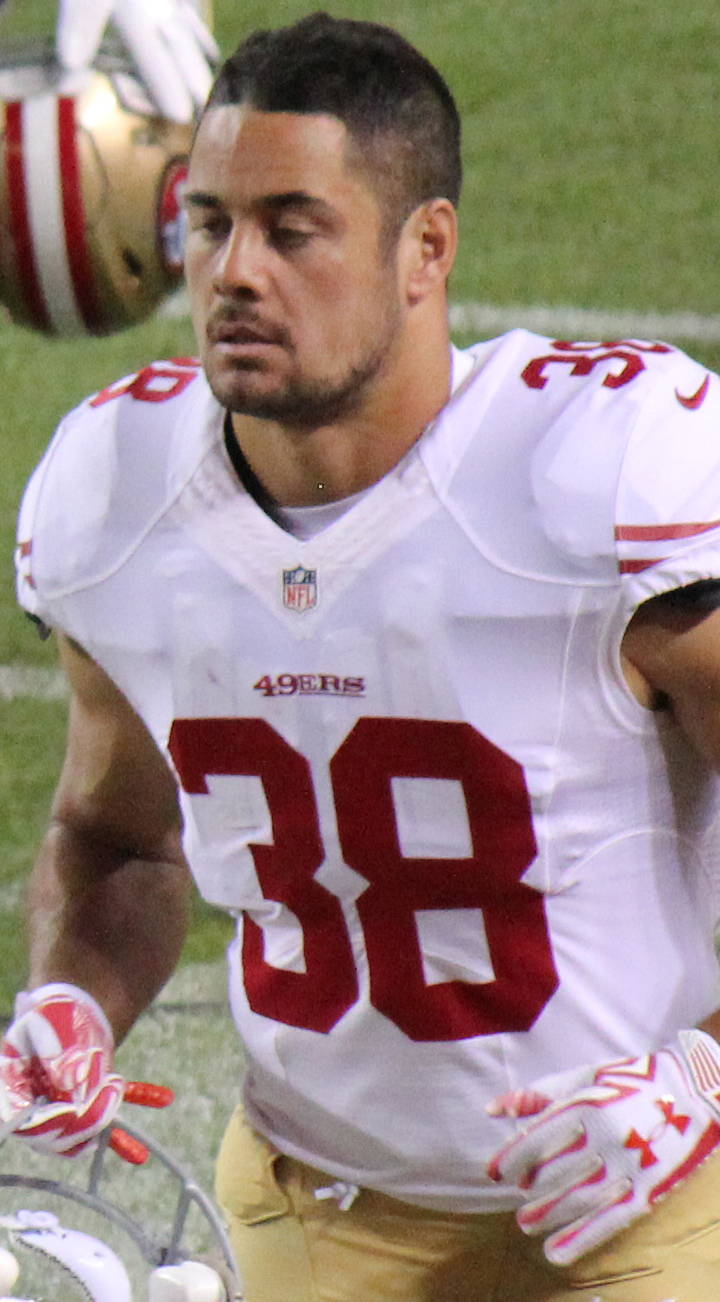

No. 38
- Position: Running back / return specialist

Personal information
- Listed height: 6 ft 2 in (1.88 m)
- Listed weight: 220 lb (100 kg)

Career information
- High school: Westfields High School (NSW)
- College: None
- NFL draft: 2015: undrafted

Career history
- San Francisco 49ers (2015)

Career NFL statistics
- Rushing yards: 52
- Receptions: 6
- Receiving yards: 27
- Return yards: 76
- Stats at Pro Football Reference

On 3 March 2015, the San Francisco 49ers of the National Football League (NFL) announced they had signed undrafted free agent Hayne to a three-year contract with a base salary of US$1,575,000 over duration of the contract and a US$115,000 guarantee should he not make 53-man roster in his first preseason. Hayne impressed several veteran Niners during the team's off season workouts in Phoenix, Arizona in early 2015. Then–starting quarterback Colin Kaepernick called him "a phenomenal athlete", adding, "It doesn't seem like there's much of a learning curve for him." Running back Reggie Bush predicted that Hayne would likely make the 49ers' 53-man roster. He was expected to compete for the running back, kick returner, and other special teams positions.

On 15 August 2015, Hayne made his preseason debut against the Houston Texans, completing a 53-yard run with his second touch of the ball. He finished the game with 5 rushes for 63 yards (avg 12.6), 2 punt returns for 24 yards (avg 12.0) and 1 kick return for 33 yards.

In Hayne's second preseason game against the Dallas Cowboys, Hayne impressed again, finishing as the game's leading rusher with 54 yards on eight carries. Again, in one of Hayne's first touches of the game, he pulled off a huge play, this time off a punt return, catching the ball over his shoulders and running for a 27-yard gain. Hayne also impressed at running back, bursting through a hole and broke free down the left sideline for a gain of 34 yards. He played all four preseason games.

On 5 September 2015, Hayne made the 53-man final roster by surviving the last day of cuts before the start of the regular season, capping a swift transition to his new sport. On 14 September 2015, Hayne made his NFL debut for the 49ers against the Minnesota Vikings at Levi's Stadium in Week 1 of the 2015 NFL season. He recorded 20 yards from scrimmage in San Francisco's 20–3 victory over the Vikings. However, Hayne also muffed his first attempt at a punt reception in front of the U.S. television audience on Monday Night Football.

On 31 October 2015, he was waived by the 49ers, and subsequently signed with their practice squad. On 26 December 2015, the 49ers promoted Hayne to the 53-man roster again after placing guard Alex Boone on their injured reserve list.

Hayne announced his retirement from the NFL on 15 May 2016, and joined the Fiji sevens team in hopes of playing in the 2016 Summer Olympics in Rio de Janeiro. He later explained that he retired due to not wanting to learn a new playbook, as the 49ers had hired Chip Kelly to be their new head coach for the 2016 season.

=== Career statistics ===
Year	Team	Games		Rushing					Receiving						Punt return				Fumbles	
Year	Team	GP	GS	Att	Yds	Avg	Lng	TD	Rec	Tgt	Yds	Avg	Lng	TD	Att	Yds	Lng	TD	Fum	Lost
2015	SF	8	1	17	52	3.1	11	0	6	6	27	4.5	7	0	8	76	37	0	3	1
Career		8	1	17	52	3.1	11	0	6	6	27	4.5	7	0	8	76	37	0	3	1

== Rugby sevens career ==
Hayne made his rugby sevens debut for Fiji on 21 May 2016 at Twickenham Stadium in the London Sevens. He competed in five of the six matches for a total game time of approximately fifteen minutes. Fiji reached the semi-final of the Cup stage which was enough to secure the 2015–16 World Rugby Sevens Series. He made the initial 23-member training squad for the Fiji team for the Olympics, but was not selected in the final squad.

=== Awards and honours ===
==== Team ====
- 2015–16: World Rugby Sevens Series winner – Fiji

== Sexual assault allegations ==
=== American allegation ===
In 2015, Hayne was accused of sexual assault in America by a woman known only by the initials JV. The woman claimed she was a virgin and heavily intoxicated when she met Hayne at a San Jose bar with friends in 2015 while he was playing in the NFL with the San Francisco 49ers. The woman alleged that Hayne went back to her apartment where he sexually assaulted her. Police investigated the incident but decided not to charge Hayne. The woman then filed a civil lawsuit against Hayne in December 2017. On 31 August 2019 Hayne settled the suit, paying almost $100,000 to the alleged victim.

=== Rape allegation ===
On 19 November 2018, Hayne was charged with aggravated sexual assault and inflicting actual bodily harm for an alleged incident that took place in the Newcastle region on 30 September 2018. On 25 July 2019, Hayne pleaded not guilty to rape charges in relation to the incident. On 7 December 2020, the judge presiding over Hayne's trial discharged the jury after they had failed to reach either a unanimous or a majority verdict.

On 16 December 2020, the case was set down for a retrial in Sydney. The retrial commenced on 8 March 2021. On 22 March 2021, Hayne was found guilty of two counts of sexual intercourse without consent, but not guilty of recklessly inflicting actual bodily harm. On 6 May 2021, Judge Syme sentenced Hayne to a maximum of 5 years and 9 months with a non-parole period of 3 years and 8 months.

In February 2022, the Court of Criminal Appeal quashed Hayne's conviction and ordered a fresh trial. Subsequently, Hayne was granted bail of $20,000 and released from Cooma Correctional Centre. In April 2023 Hayne was convicted of rape. After initially being granted bail until sentencing, Hayne was remanded into custody. On 12 May 2023, Hayne was sentenced to 4 years and 9 months in prison.

In June 2024, Hayne won an appeal against his rape conviction. He was released after spending two years in prison. It was announced that Hayne would not stand trial for a fourth time, after prosecutors dropped the charges against him.

== Personal life ==
Hayne is a Christian. He became a member of the Hillsong Church in 2008, partly inspired by his Fijian teammates at the 2008 World Cup. Hayne is a supporter of Liverpool F.C. of the English football Premier League, and considers Steven Gerrard one of his sporting heroes.

In 2016, after returning to Australia following his brief career in the American National Football League (NFL), Hayne met Amellia Bonnici. The couple have a daughter and married in January 2021.
