= Manoa Thompson =

Fijian rugby league player (born 1968)

Personal information
- Born: 11 June 1968 (age 58) Suva, Fiji

Playing information
- Height: 188 cm (6 ft 2 in)
- Weight: 95 kg (14 st 13 lb)
- Position: Centre, Fullback, Wing
Club
Years	Team	Pld	T	G	FG	P
1989–93	South Sydney	61	29	0	2	118
1994	Western Suburbs	7	0	0	0	0
1995	Auckland Warriors	7	0	0	0	0
1995–96	Warrington Wolves	9	2	0	0	8
1998	AS Saint Estève
2000	AS Carcassonne
	Total	84	31	0	2	126
Representative
Years	Team	Pld	T	G	FG	P
1996	Fiji	1	0	0	0	0
- Relatives: Jarryd Hayne (son)

Manoa Thompson (born 11 June 1968) is a Fijian former professional rugby league footballer. Primarily playing as a centre, he played his first grade career with the South Sydney Rabbitohs, Western Suburbs Magpies, and the Auckland Warriors in the NSWRL / ARL competition, as well as playing in the Super League for the Warrington Wolves. He represented the Fijian national team.

Thompson is the father of former professional NRL, NFL, and rugby sevens player, Jarryd Hayne.

== Early years ==
Thompson was born in Fiji to a Fijian mother, Elenoa Tokalautawa, and an Australian father, and moved to Australia when he was 11. He was adopted by his mother's younger sister, Ana Waqanibaravi Thompson. He played his junior football with the Alexandria Rovers. Thompson also played rugby union and toured Japan with a New South Wales schoolboys side that included Graham Mackay and Scott Gourley.

== Playing career ==
Thompson joined the South Sydney Rabbitohs, where he played in their champion under-21 side before playing in their under-23 side. He made his first grade début for Souths in round 11 of the 1989 season.

Thompson went on to play 61 first grade games for Souths between 1989 and 1993. He spent 1994 with the Western Suburbs Magpies, playing in only seven matches after having knee and ankle surgery during the off season. In 1995 he was part of the inaugural squad for the new Auckland Warriors franchise and played in the centres for the Warriors in their first ever competition game, a 25–22 loss to the Brisbane Broncos in front of 29,220 fans at the Ericsson Stadium in Auckland. However, he again only played in seven matches and was not retained for the 1996 season.

In November 1995 Thompson signed with English club Warrington and played for the club during 1996's inaugural Super League I. He left Warrington in February 1996 after failing to settle in Britain. Thompson represented Fiji in 1996. His only appearance saw a 72–4 loss to Great Britain at the Prince Charles Park in Nadi, the score being the record for the largest test win by the Lions.

After returning from England, Thompson trialed with the Canberra Raiders before signing with the Penrith Panthers. However he spent the season in reserve grade and returned to South Sydney during the off season.

After not securing a contract, Thompson moved to France and played for AS Saint Estève before spending a year in rugby union, playing for RC Narbonne alongside David Knox. Thompson then returned to league, spending a season with AS Carcassonne before retiring.

== Later years ==
In 2007 he was working as a delivery driver. He is still involved in rugby league, sitting on the Australian Fiji rugby league board and helping to coach that organisation's youth sides.
