= 2009 State of Origin series =

Australian rugby league series

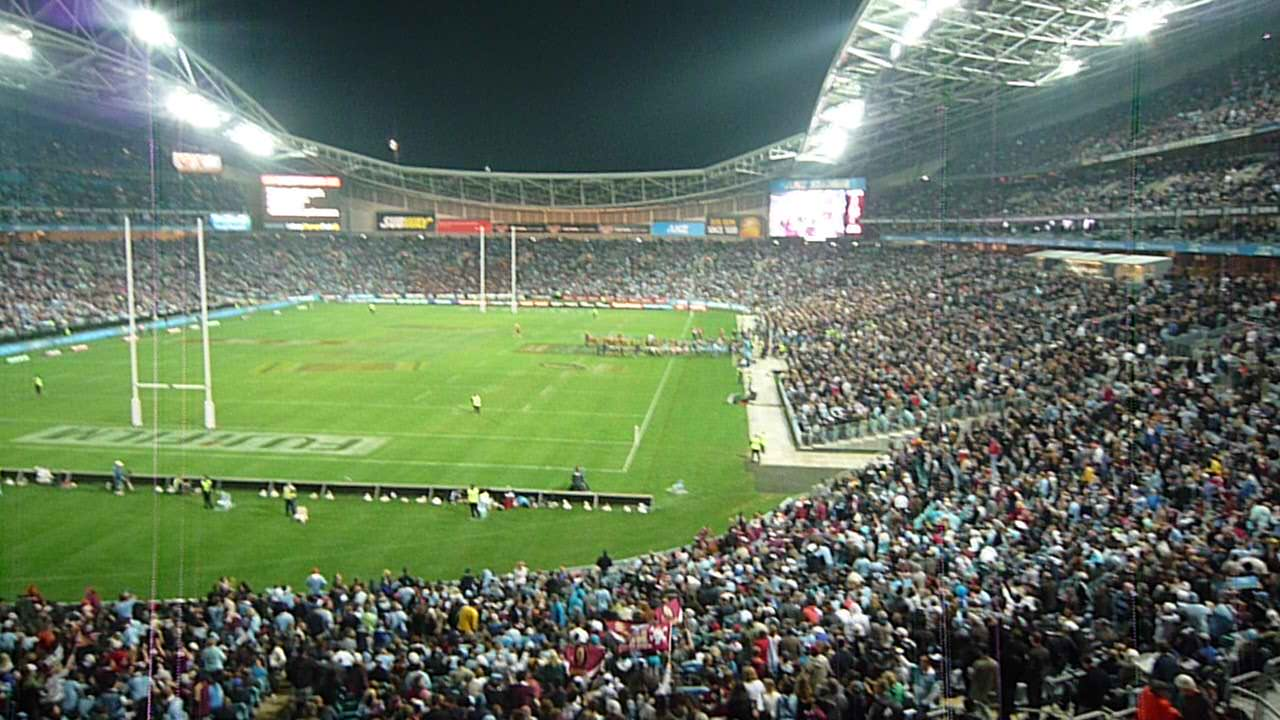
- State of Origin 2 at Stadium Australia, Sydney
- Won by: Queensland (14th title)
- Series margin: 2–1
- Points scored: 128
- Attendance: 183,865 (ave. 61,288 per match)
- Top points scorer(s): Johnathan Thurston (24)
- Top try scorer(s): Greg Inglis (3); Ben Creagh (3); Jarryd Hayne (3)

The 2009 State of Origin series was the 28th time that the annual three-game series between the Queensland and New South Wales representative rugby league football teams was played entirely under 'state of origin' selection rules. Queensland won their first two matches to retain the shield and to record 14 series wins, as well as the first time in Origin history that a state had won the series for four consecutive years. Maroon centre Greg Inglis was awarded the Wally Lewis Medal as player of the series.

== Game I ==
For the first time, game one of the series was played in Melbourne. The stakes were high for New South Wales in the face of the genuine possibility of a four consecutive series defeat – never yet suffered since the introduction of the three match series format. Blues selectors opted for eight debutantes, dropping fourteen of the seventeen players who appeared in game I of 2008. The new faces were McManus, Jennings, Stewart, Campese, Farah, Creagh, Weyman and Poore. With abundant talent and experience to choose from, Queensland selectors opted for the international backline who had represented Australia in April against New Zealand, meaning Slater at fullback dislodged incumbent Maroon fullback Hunt to the interchange bench. The entire Queensland squad had previous Origin experience with thirteen of them having represented on six or more occasions.

Wednesday, 3 June 2009

Queensland	28 – 18	New South Wales
Tries; Inglis (15', 43') 2 Slater (10') 1 Thurston (18') 1 Boyd (80') 1 Goals; Thurston 4/5	(Report) (Game stats)	Tries; 1 (33') Creagh; 1 (61') Wing; 1 (69') Hayne; Goals; 3/4 Gidley

Etihad Stadium, Melbourne
Attendance: 50,967
Referee: Shayne Hayne, Tony Archer
Player of the Match: Johnathan Thurston

New South Wales took a 2–0 lead after an early penalty goal but then in the eighth minute a try to their winger Hayne was disallowed after a long video-referee deliberation. Hayne's right boot was ruled to have brushed the touch line on his way to score, overruling the on field decision of the touch judge. This decision appeared to rock the confidence of the young Blues squad and soon after Queensland took a commanding lead with a succession of tries to Slater, Inglis and then Thurston. Creagh crossed for the Blues before half-time picking up a pass from Hayne after he had chased a kick. The scoreline was 18–6 at the break.

As the second half kicked off, Inglis struck quickly with a spectacular try from long range to take the score to 24–6 and his tally to two. New South Wales from that point found some structure and the game played more like the traditional origin arm wrestle till Craig Wing made his entrance from the Blues interchange bench at the 53 minute mark. Two minutes later, off a deflected kick, Wing scored to bring New South Wales within twelve and the Blues dummy halves – Wing and Farah double tagging in the role – began to find gaps in amongst the tiring Queensland forwards. In the 69th minute, another lucky kick deflection, this time off Maroons prop Steve Price and into the hands of Farah which was then passed to Hayne, resulted in Hayne's second try and a 24–18 scoreline with 10 minutes to go. However, in the 78th minute, following a handling error from Blues fullback Kurt Gidley, Darius Boyd crossed in the corner after the scrum, to seal Queensland a 28–18 victory and first blood in the series.

The game was watched by a national audience of 3.48 million people which was a record.

== Game II ==
Although the media speculated immediately after game I that New South Wales selectors would stick firm with the initial squad, by the time the game II team was announced on 15 June a number of injuries paved the way for numerous changes including the selection of shadow players to cover some players in doubt: Trent Barrett was recalled in his first season back in the NRL since 2007 replacing Terry Campese (dropped); Paul Gallen was selected at lock, replacing Anthony Laffranchi (dropped); Glenn Stewart and Anthony Watmough were moved onto the interchange bench replacing the injured Lewis and Luke Bailey; David Williams was picked on the wing to replace the injured James McManus. Blues selectors also named three shadow players – Tom Learoyd-Lahrs, Joel Monaghan and Josh Morris to cover injuries doubts over Michael Jennings, Jamie Lyon and Craig Wing. Ultimately, Monaghan and Morris came into the side for Jennings and Wing respectively who failed to overcome injury.

Despite seven players being struck by a virus 24 hours before kick-off, for Queensland the only change was Willie Tonga who was selected to replace the injured Justin Hodges and to make his first Origin appearance since 2004. Neville Costigan was put on stand-by as 18th man instead of Matthew Scott. This was also the first time ever that every club in the NRL provided a player for State of Origin.

Wednesday, 24 June 2009

New South Wales	14 – 24	Queensland
Tries; Hayne (28', 37') 2 Williams (62') 1 Goals; Gidley 1/3	(Report) (Game stats)	Tries; 1 (6') Inglis; 1 (17') Folau; 1 (24') Lockyer; 1 (79') Smith; Goals; 4/4 Thurston

ANZ Stadium, Sydney
Attendance: 80,459
Referee: Shayne Hayne, Tony Archer
Player of the Match: Sam Thaiday

Queensland were set to make history by achieving four series wins in a row. They looked on their way when they went out to an 18–0 lead after 25 minutes with tries to Greg Inglis, Israel Folau and Darren Lockyer. A 22nd minute high shot from Trent Barrett on Inglis, fractured his jaw and saw the Queenslander sidelined for the remainder of the match. Petero Civoniceva also suffered a season-ending foot injury in the first half. Two miraculous tries to Jarryd Hayne had NSW on the comeback trail at halftime. New South Wales then scored again with just under 20 minutes to go to make it an 18–14 scoreline with debutant David Williams scoring. It looked as though NSW could snatch an upset but Queensland put the game beyond doubt when Cameron Smith scored with a minute remaining making the final score 24–14. The Maroons therefore become the first side to win 4 series in a row, since the State of Origin began in 1980 winning 2006, 2007, 2008 and now 2009.

== Game III ==
Injuries saw Queenslanders Hannant and Civoniceva replaced by Scott and Shillington. Neville Costigan moved from 18th man in game II to an interchange spot replacing Nate Myles.

New South Wales selectors made a number of changes. Kimmorley was brought in to replace Wallace, making the Blues' halves combination the oldest in Origin history. Morris was brought in for Lyon and Ennis brought in for Farah. Perry, Waterhouse and White, all experienced Origin campaigners, made a return to the side at the expense of Weyman and O'Donnell. Jennings and Poore returned from injury, replacing Monaghan and Kite.

The Blues also took a leaf out of Queensland's book by having past New South Wales Origin players join the pre-match camp to help the team prepare.

Wednesday, 15 July 2009

Queensland	16 – 28	New South Wales
Tries; Johnson (13') 1 Hodges (43') 1 Slater (53') 1 Goals; Thurston 2/3	(Report)	Tries; 2 (19', 66') Creagh; 1 (37') Williams (pen.); 1 (46') Morris; Goals; 3/3 Ennis; 3/3 Gidley

Suncorp Stadium, Brisbane
Attendance: 52,439
Referee: Tony Archer, Shayne Hayne
Player of the Match: Anthony Watmough

Game III saw New South Wales looking down the barrel of not just a fourth straight series win to Queensland, but a clean sweep series. Sam Thaiday and Ashley Harrison were approved to play for Queensland in spite of carrying injuries into the game. The heroes for NSW were Kurt Gidley, playing injured and who hadn't been potent in attack in the first two games, Brett Kimmorley making his first Origin return since game II of 2007 and Anthony Watmough who was tireless in attack and defence.

Queensland took the lead in the 13th minute with a try to Dallas Johnson before Ben Creagh powered over the line six minutes later for the Blues off a short-pass from Watmough. In the 34th minute New South Wales winger David Williams was awarded a try after juggling the ball picked up from a Trent Barrett kick. Thurston lashed out with his boot in desperate defence and kicked Williams in the mouth as he attempted to score. The Blues were thus awarded the first eight-point try in Origin history.

Kimmorley ran down Greg Inglis with a tackle that took the giant centre across the touchline and stopped a certain Queensland try and moments later Kurt Gidley did likewise to a runaway Darius Boyd.

The tension was high right to the end. In the 78th minute Jarryd Hayne crossed but the try was disallowed since in the previous play Steve Price had been illegally concussed. After being knocked out by a Brett White punch, Price was "blindsided" on his way down by Trent Waterhouse and then medi-cabbed off several minutes later in a state of severe concussion. Queensland players became particularly incensed by the actions of Justin Poore who appeared to pick up and then let fall to the ground the concussed Price. This act was labelled by some Queensland players as 'a dog act'. Waterhouse became the first Blues player in Origin history to be sent off, and the third played player to be sent off in State of Origin after Gordon Tallis in Game I of 2000 while Justin Hodges challenged Brett White to a one-on-one fight. White accepted the challenge by way of a nod and can be seen in several alternate angles (as shown on The Footy Show) responding "Come on!", shortly after licking the blood from his lips in a provocative manner. Hodges then signalled for White to come to him and fight, in an attempt to goad White into precipitating a new fight and get sent off, however White ultimately did not accept. Queensland were then awarded a penalty and kicked the ball to New South Wales full back Kurt Gidley who was swamped by Johnathan Thurston, Sam Thaiday, Neville Costigan and Karmichael Hunt. Creagh then pushed Hodges who had come in as support and quickly backpedaled behind his teammates, precipitating a new altercation. Both Creagh and Thaiday were sin binned although the officials were criticised for allowing White, Hodges and Price's replacement to remain on the field. When the fight was finished and Gidley played the ball Williams took the game's final hit-up tackled by Johnathan Thurston which then sparked Michael Crocker to try to fight Blues hooker Michael Ennis before Referee Shayne Hayne broke up their melee and ended the match.

== Teams ==
The 18th man is a reserve to cover for any forthcoming injuries and, unless chosen, does not actually play.

=== New South Wales Blues ===
Position	Game 1	Game 2	Game 3
Fullback	Kurt Gidley (c)		
Wing	Jarryd Hayne		
Centre	Michael Jennings	Joel Monaghan ^{3}	Michael Jennings
Centre	Jamie Lyon ^{5}		Josh Morris
Wing	James McManus	David Williams	
Five-Eighth	Terry Campese	Trent Barrett	
Halfback	Peter Wallace		Brett Kimmorley
Prop	Brent Kite		Justin Poore
Hooker	Robbie Farah		Michael Ennis
Prop	Luke Bailey	Michael Weyman	Josh Perry
Second Row	Luke O'Donnell		Trent Waterhouse
Second Row	Ben Creagh		
Lock	Anthony Laffranchi ^{2}	Paul Gallen	Anthony Watmough
Interchange	Craig Wing	Josh Morris ^{4}	Brett White
Interchange	Justin Poore		Craig Wing
Interchange	Michael Weyman	Anthony Watmough	Tom Learoyd-Lahrs
Interchange	Luke Lewis ^{1}	Glenn Stewart	
18th Man	Anthony Watmough	Tom Learoyd-Lahrs	Chris Houston
Coach	Craig Bellamy		

^{1} – Glenn Stewart was originally selected for game one, but subsequently forced to withdraw following suspension for a dangerous tackle. He was replaced by Luke Lewis.

^{2} – Paul Gallen was originally selected to play for game one, but withdrew due to injury. He was replaced by Anthony Laffranchi.

^{3} – Michael Jennings was originally selected to play for game two, but withdrew due to injury. He was replaced by Joel Monaghan.

^{4} – Craig Wing was originally selected to play for game 2, but withdrew due to injury. He was replaced by Josh Morris.

^{5} – Jamie Lyon was originally selected to play for game 3, but withdrew due to injury. He was replaced by Josh Morris.

=== Queensland Maroons ===
Position	Game 1	Game 2	Game 3
Fullback	Billy Slater		
Wing	Darius Boyd		
Centre	Greg Inglis		
Centre	Justin Hodges	Willie Tonga	Justin Hodges
Wing	Israel Folau		Willie Tonga
Five-Eighth	Darren Lockyer (c)		
Halfback	Johnathan Thurston		
Prop	Steve Price		
Hooker	Cameron Smith		
Prop	Petero Civoniceva		Matthew Scott
Second Row	Ashley Harrison		
Second Row	Sam Thaiday		
Lock	Dallas Johnson		
Interchange	Karmichael Hunt		
Interchange	Ben Hannant		David Shillington
Interchange	Nate Myles		Neville Costigan
Interchange	Michael Crocker		
18th man	Matthew Scott	Neville Costigan	Cooper Cronk
Coach	Mal Meninga		

== See also ==
- 2009 NRL season
