= Brett Morris =

Australia international rugby league footballer

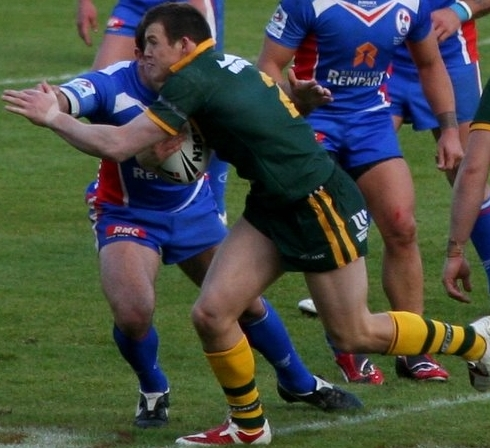

Personal information
- Full name: Brett Morris
- Born: 23 August 1986 (age 40) Kiama, New South Wales, Australia

Playing information
- Height: 183 cm (6 ft 0 in)
- Weight: 96 kg (15 st 2 lb)
- Position: Wing, Fullback
Club
Years	Team	Pld	T	G	FG	P
2006–14	St. George Illawarra	172	114	0	0	456
2015–18	Canterbury Bulldogs	68	34	0	0	136
2019–21	Sydney Roosters	41	28	0	0	120
	Total	281	176	0	0	712
Representative
Years	Team	Pld	T	G	FG	P
2009–14	Australia	18	23	0	0	92
2010–17	New South Wales	15	5	0	0	20
2011	NRL All Stars	1	1	0	0	4
2012	NSW Country	1	0	0	0	0
2013	Prime Minister's XIII	1	0	0	0	0
- Father: Steve Morris
- Relatives: Josh Morris (brother)

Brett Morris (born 23 August 1986) is an Australian former professional rugby league footballer who played on the wing and as a fullback for the St George Illawarra Dragons, Canterbury-Bankstown Bulldogs and the Sydney Roosters in the National Rugby League (NRL) and Australia at international level.

He played for New South Wales in the State of Origin series, NRL All Stars, Country Origin and the Prime Minister's XIII. Early in his career he played as a fullback . Between 2006 and 2014 he played for the St. George Illawarra Dragons with whom he won the 2010 NRL Grand Final. In 2019 with the Sydney Roosters he won a second NRL premiership title.

Morris is the fifth highest try scorer for in premiership history, with 176 tries.

== Background ==
Morris was born at St George Hospital in Kogarah, New South Wales, but went to school in Kiama, New South Wales, Australia.

He played his junior rugby league with the Kiama Knights alongside his twin brother Josh Morris before signing with the St. George Illawarra Dragons.

Morris is the son of St. George Dragons, New South Wales, and Australian rugby league representative Steve "Slippery" Morris, and the twin brother of Josh Morris who also played for the Roosters in the NRL and was previously a state and national representative.

== Playing career ==
=== Early career ===
In round 9 of the 2006 NRL season, Morris made his first grade debut for the St. George Illawarra, playing against Cronulla on the wing in a 30–12 loss at Remondis Stadium. In round 15, against the Brisbane Broncos at Suncorp Stadium, Morris scored his first NRL try in the 79th minute off a Mathew Head kick. Morris finished his debut year with 12 tries from 19 matches.

In the 2007 round 4 match against Cronulla, Morris played his first match of the season and his first match alongside his twin brother Josh Morris in St. George Illawarra's 40–4 loss. In round 7 of that year, against the Sydney Roosters in the ANZAC Day match, Morris suffered a season-ending shoulder injury, managing just two games for the season.

In 2008, Morris made his return to the St. George Illawarra first grade team in round 1, playing against the Wests Tigers. In round 7, on the ANZAC Day match against the Sydney Roosters, Brett and his twin Josh scored tries in the same match together in the Dragons 26–6 win at ANZ Stadium. Morris finished the year with 16 matches and eight tries.

=== 2009 ===
Morris had an outstanding 2009 NRL season for St. George Illawarra, including scoring four tries in round 9 against the North Queensland Cowboys in the club's 24–20 loss at 1300SMILES Stadium, a hat trick in round 11 against Cronulla, and another hat-trick in round 26 against the Parramatta Eels. He was named Dally M highest tryscorer of the year with 25 tries in 24 matches.

Morris was selected to play for Australia in the 2009 Four Nations tournament. He crossed six times in 4 matches to finish the tournament as top try-scorer, including scoring 2 tries in the 46-16 Final win over England at Elland Road. Morris re-signed with the Dragons until the end of 2012 and said after his re-signing: "I enjoy living in Wollongong, it is where my family and friends are and the Dragons are the team I grew up supporting so I'm very happy to be staying."

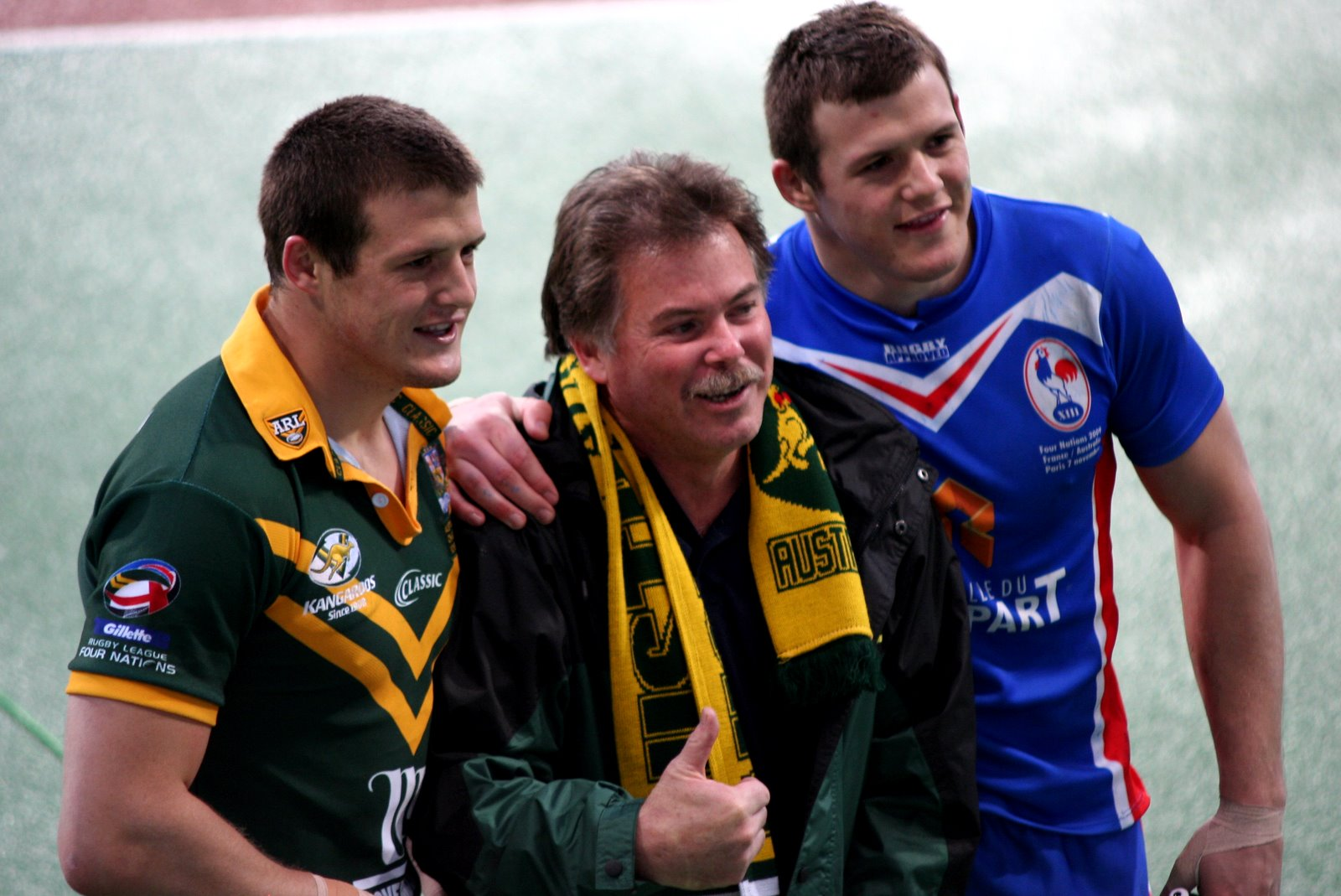
Brett Morris (right) with father Steve (centre) with brother Josh (left)

=== 2010 ===
Morris kept up his try-scoring form early in the season, scoring a hat-trick in round 2 against his twin brother's team, Canterbury. He was selected on the wing for Australia in the 2010 Anzac Test, scoring both of Australia's tries in the 12–8 win. Morris made his debut for New South Wales in game 1 of the 2010 State of Origin series, playing on the wing in the Blues 28–24 loss at ANZ Stadium, He played all three matches of the series in the NSW 3–0 series loss. Later on the season, Morris played on the wing in 2010 NRL Grand Final against the Sydney Roosters, helping St. George Illawarra to their first premiership as a joint-venture in their 32–8 win. The grand final victory ended 31 years of hurt for St. George fans of the joint-venture as the club had gone close on numerous occasions to ending their drought. Morris finished the 2010 NRL season as the Dragons highest tryscorer with 20 tries in 25 matches. He was later selected for Australia 2010 Four Nations squad, playing in 4 matches and scoring 3 tries in the tournament, including playing on the wing in the loss against New Zealand in the Final.

=== 2011 ===
During the pre-season, Morris played for the NRL All Stars against the Indigenous All Stars. In the 2011 World Club Challenge match, against Super League premiers the Wigan Warriors, Morris was named man-of-the-match after scoring two tries in the Dragons 21–15 victory at DW Stadium. In the 2011 Anzac Test, Morris played in the 20–10 win over New Zealand. He played in 2 matches for New South Wales in the 2011 State of Origin series. In round 20, against the Canberra Raiders, Morris played his 100th NRL match, scoring a try in St. George Illawarra's 24–19. He scored 10 tries in his 21 matches for the Dragons.

=== 2012 ===
On 21 February 2012, Morris re-signed with St. George Illawarra for a further three years until the end of the 2015 NRL season. From the Dragons 36–12 win against the Wests Tigers at Jubilee Oval in round 3, Morris was shifted from his usual position on the wing to fullback by coach Steve Price. Morris also played at fullback for NSW Country Origin in their 24–22 loss to NSW City in Mudgee. Morris played a match for the New South Wales in the 2012 State of Origin series, playing in game 3 on the wing and scoring a try in the Blues 21–20 loss at Suncorp Stadium. Morris finished the 2012 NRL season as the Dragons highest tryscorer with 14 tries in 23 matches.

=== 2013 ===
Morris played for Australia on the wing and scored a try in the 2013 Anzac Test 32–12 victory against New Zealand at Canberra Stadium. Morris played in all of the New South Wales' 3 matches and scored a try in the 2013 State of Origin series. In round 25, against the Parramatta Eels, Morris played his 150th NRL career match in the Dragons 26–22 loss at Parramatta Stadium. Morris finished the 2013 NRL season with him playing 21 matches and scoring 9 tries for the Dragons.

On 29 September 2013, Morris played for Prime Minister's XIII against Papua New Guinea, playing on the wing in the 50–10 win at Kokopo. Morris was selected for the Australia Kangaroos 24-man squad for the 2013 World Cup. Morris played in 5 matches and scored 8 tries, which including scoring 4 tries against the USA Tomahawks in the Kangaroos' 62–0 win at Racecourse Ground in Wrexham, Wales, and 2 tries in the World Cup final against New Zealand.

=== 2014 ===
In February 2014, Morris was selected as captain of the Dragons inaugural 2014 Auckland Nines squad. In the 2014 Anzac Test, Morris played for Australia on the wing and scored 2 tries in the 30–18 victory against New Zealand at the SFS. During game 1 of the 2014 State of Origin series, Morris dislocated his shoulder while scoring a try in New South Wales 12–8 win at Suncorp Stadium. He continued playing on during the match, later finding out that he had also suffered a broken bone and ligament damage. Morris was ruled for the other two 2014 Origin matches. In round 22, against the Canberra Raiders, Morris took over captaincy, after usual captain Ben Creagh was ruled out with injury, and had a brilliant match, scoring a hat trick to help the Dragons win in Canberra for the first time since round 14 of the 2000 NRL season. Morris finished the 2014 NRL season with him playing in 18 matches and scoring 14 tries for the Dragons.

On 9 September 2014, Morris was selected for the Australia Kangaroos 2014 Four Nations train-on squad but was later ruled out from the final 24-man squad with injury. On 23 October 2014, Brett Morris reunited with twin brother, Josh Morris, at Canterbury, signing on a four-year contract, through until the end of 2018.

=== 2015 ===
In round 1, against the Penrith Panthers, Morris made his club debut for Canterbury at fullback, scoring a try in the 24–18 loss at Penrith Stadium. In round 5, against the South Sydney Rabbitohs, he injured his hamstring in a man-of-the-match performance in the Bulldogs' controversial 18–17 loss at ANZ Stadium. He missed 7 rounds, before returning in round 13 against his former club, the St. George Illawarra Dragons, in Canterbury's 29–16 win at ANZ Stadium. Morris played in games two and three of the 2015 State of Origin series, starting on the wing. Morris finished his first year with Canterbury playing in 16 matches and scoring 9 tries in the 2015 NRL season.

=== 2016 ===
In March 2016, Morris was ruled out for four months with a knee injury. Morris made his return in round 16, playing against the Brisbane Broncos and scoring a hat trick of tries in the 40–14 win at ANZ Stadium. In June 2016, Morris, alongside his twin brother Josh were approached by England coach Wayne Bennett to make the switch for the upcoming 2016 Four Nations series. Morris is eligible for England due to his grandparents. Morris finished the 2016 NRL season with him playing in 11 matches and scoring 10 tries for the Canterbury club.

=== 2017 ===
In round 4, against Manly, Morris played in his 200th NRL career match in Canterbury's 36–0 loss at Brookvale Oval. On 18 July Morris announced his retirement from representative rugby league. He had played 15 origins for NSW and had an "incredible record" of 23 tries in his 18 matches for Australia. He said, "I'm so proud to have been able to represent my state and my family in the toughest arena of all and have now made the decision to retire from rep football".

=== 2018 ===
In 2018, Morris signed a contract to join the Sydney Roosters for the 2019 NRL season.

=== 2019 ===
Morris scored a hat-trick on his Roosters debut in the World Club Challenge victory over Wigan on 17 February. In round 2 against Manly-Warringah, Morris scored a try for the Roosters in their 26–18 victory at Brookvale Oval but was later taken from the field with a knee injury after the turf gave way underneath him.

After the game had finished, Morris was asked by reporters if he was angry at the state of the field following his latest injury. Morris replied "I'd be lying if I said I wasn't, to be honest, "If it was the first time it happened to me I could brush it off, but it's the second time I've been to Brookvale and my knee has dug in and I've had an injury as a result. As a player you work so hard to get out there, and to have this happen as a result of the ground is frustrating. Don't get me wrong, I love being able to play at suburban grounds. I'm a country boy and any time that happens I love that stuff. But it's frustrating that this has happened as a result of the surface".

Morris was subsequently ruled out for 2–3 weeks with a medial collateral ligament (MCL) tear in his left knee.

In round 19, Morris scored a try against his former club Canterbury-Bankstown in a 20–12 victory at ANZ Stadium. In Round 20 against the Gold Coast, Morris scored a Hat-Trick as the Sydney Roosters won the match 58–6 at the Sydney Cricket Ground.

On 21 August, Morris was voted as one of the best players of the decade in the NRL team of the decade announcement which spanned from the 2010 to 2019 seasons. Premiership-winning coaches Phil Gould, Craig Bellamy, Trent Robinson and Ricky Stuart were also part of the panel along with Hall of Famers Peter Sterling, Darren Lockyer, Danny Buderus and Laurie Daley.

Morris played on the wing in the club's 2019 NRL Grand Final victory over Canberra at ANZ Stadium. Morris made a total of 15 appearances and scored 7 tries in the 2019 NRL season.

=== 2020 ===
Brett's twin brother, Josh, requested to be released by Cronulla and then joined the Sydney Roosters from round 3 of 2020.

In round 7 of the 2020 NRL season, Morris scored a hat-trick against one of his former clubs as the Sydney Roosters defeated St. George Illawarra 26–12 at Bankwest Stadium.

In round 15, Morris scored two tries as the Sydney Roosters defeated Wests Tigers 38–16 at Leichhardt Oval.

Morris made a total of 17 appearances and scored 12 tries in the 2020 NRL season as the club fell short of a third successive premiership.

=== 2021 ===
In round 1 of the 2021 NRL season, Morris scored a hat-trick in the Sydney Roosters 46–4 victory over Manly-Warringah at the Sydney Cricket Ground.

The following week, Morris scored another hat-trick in the Sydney Roosters 40–6 victory over the Wests Tigers. Morris became the first player in history to score consecutive hat-tricks in the opening two rounds of the competition. In round 4, he scored another two tries in the Sydney Roosters 32–12 victory over the New Zealand Warriors.

In round 8, Morris led the Sydney Roosters out as captain in absence of James Tedesco who was ruled out at the last-minute. He was taken from the field in the 77th minute of the Sydney Roosters 38–4 victory over Newcastle with an ACL injury. Sydney Roosters coach, Trent Robinson stated that he believed the injury may have ended Morris' career

Morris announced his retirement from rugby league on 7 June 2021.

== Coaching career ==
Morris was announced as assistant coach for 2022 for the Sydney Roosters. In 2024, Morris was announced as the NSW Cup coach for the Sydney Roosters.
