= Josh Morris (rugby league) =

Australia international rugby league footballer

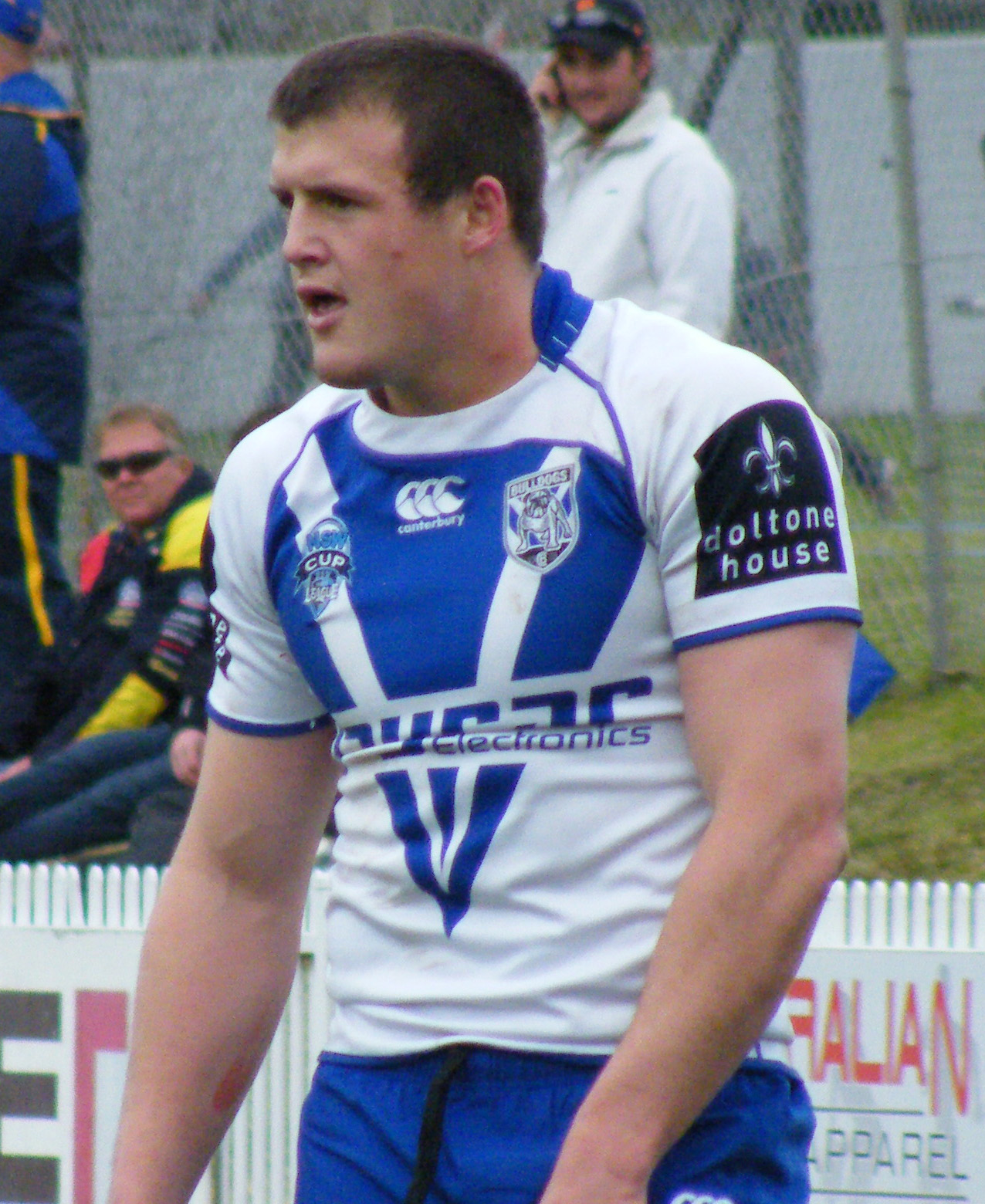
- Morris in 2011

Personal information
- Full name: Joshua Anthony Morris
- Born: 23 August 1986 (age 40) Kiama, New South Wales, Australia
- Height: 182 cm (6 ft 0 in)
- Weight: 98 kg (15 st 6 lb)

Playing information
- Position: Centre, Wing, Fullback
Club
Years	Team	Pld	T	G	FG	P
2007–08	St. George Illawarra	46	20	0	0	80
2009–18	Canterbury Bulldogs	217	103	0	0	412
2019–20	Cronulla Sharks	25	15	0	0	60
2020–21	Sydney Roosters	37	20	0	0	80
	Total	325	158	0	0	632
Representative
Years	Team	Pld	T	G	FG	P
2007–12	Country Origin	3	0	0	0	0
2008–13	Prime Minister's XIII	3	3	0	0	12
2009–19	New South Wales	14	6	0	0	24
2009–14	Australia	6	4	0	0	16
2010	NRL All Stars	1	1	0	0	4
- Source: As of 17 Sept 2021
- Father: Steve Morris
- Relatives: Brett Morris (brother)

Joshua Morris (born 23 August 1986) is a former Australian professional rugby league footballer who last played as a centre for the Sydney Roosters in the NRL and Australia at international level.

He also played for the St. George Illawarra Dragons, Canterbury-Bankstown Bulldogs and Cronulla-Sutherland Sharks in the National Rugby League. Morris played for the Country Origin, Prime Minister's XIII, New South Wales State of Origin and NRL All Stars sides.

== Background ==
Morris was born in Kiama, New South Wales, Australia.

He is the twin brother of Brett Morris, and they played for the Sydney Roosters, St. George Illawarra Dragons and Canterbury-Bankstown Bulldogs together. They are the sons of former St. George Dragons, New South Wales, and Australian rugby league representative Steve "Slippery" Morris.

== St George Illawarra ==
Following his 2007 first grade debut, he played two seasons for the St. George Illawarra Dragons in a variety of backline positions, his preferred position being left centre.

He joined the Canterbury-Bankstown Bulldogs for the 2009 NRL season in the hope of securing a permanent starting spot in the centres. Injury permitting, Josh achieved this throughout the season.

He made his representative debut for Country in the 2007 City vs Country Origin match. In 2008, he played wing in the Australian Prime Minister's XIII side in its match against Papua New Guinea.

== Canterbury-Bankstown ==
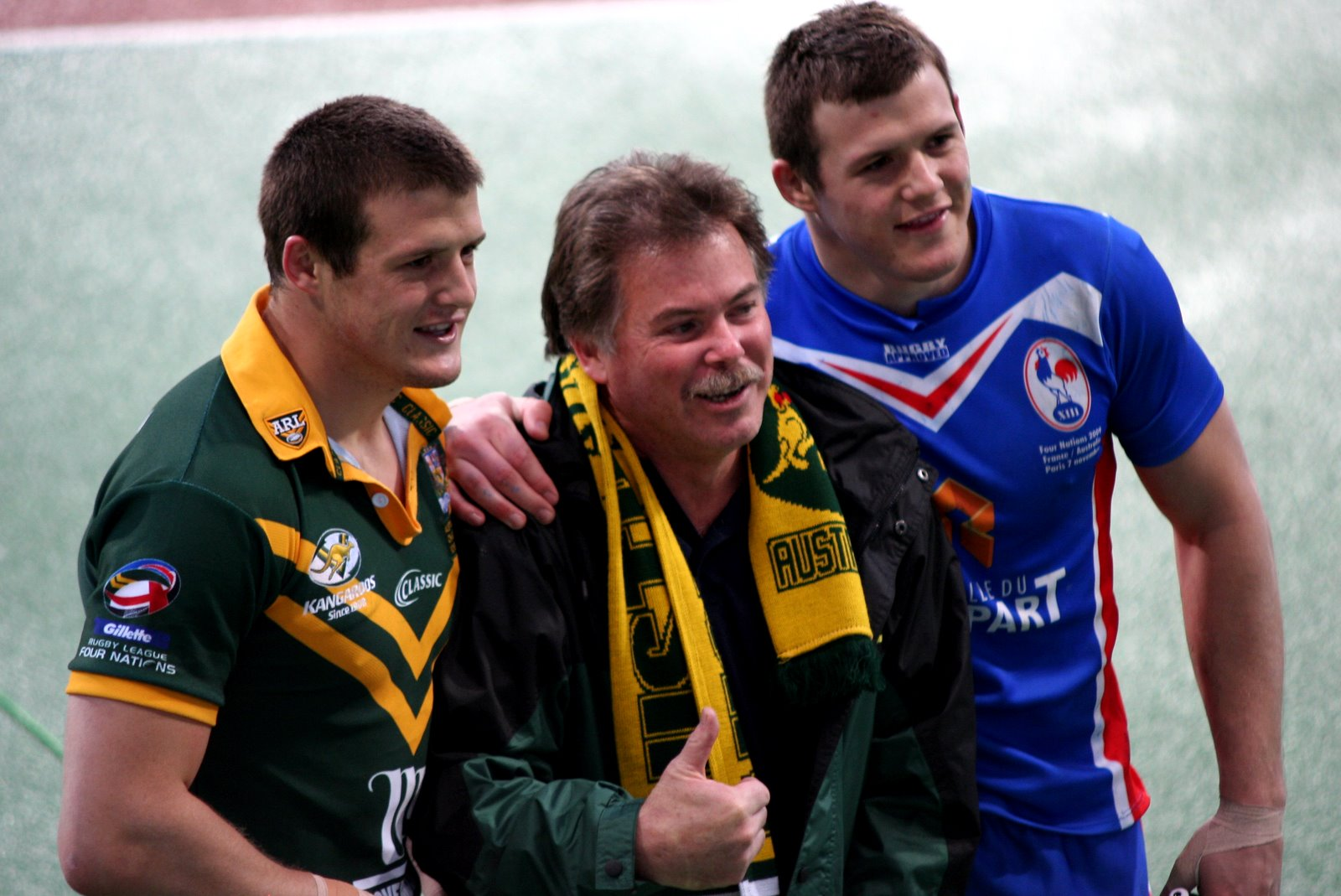
Josh Morris (left) with father Steve (centre) and brother Brett (right)

Morris moved to the Canterbury-Bankstown Bulldogs for the 2009 NRL season. In the 2009 State of Origin series Josh was named in the 40-man New South Wales preliminary squad for State of Origin. He was then selected for game 2 and 3, having missed the first game through injury. Morris made his State of Origin debut for NSW 31 years to the day that his dad Steve had made his only test appearance for Australia in 1978.

Morris finished as Canterbury's top try scorer in 2009 as the club finished the regular season in second place. Morris played in the club's preliminary final defeat against arch rivals Parramatta at ANZ Stadium.

He was selected in the 24-man squad for the Gilette Four Nations Tour at the end of the 2009 season and made his international debut for Australia against France at Charlety Stadium in Paris on 7 November, scoring two tries playing inside his brother Brett, who also scored twice.

In round 3 of the 2010 NRL season, he scored the first 4-try haul of his first grade career in Canterbury's 60–14 drubbing of the Sydney Roosters.

Morris was selected to play on the right wing against Wales in the 2011 Rugby League Four Nations.

At the 2012 Dally M Awards Morris was named the NRL's centre of the year. Morris played in the 2012 NRL grand final loss to Melbourne at Centre and nearly scored a try which would have brought Canterbury back into the game but the ball was knocked out of his hands by Melbourne fullback Billy Slater.

Morris played for Canterbury in the 2014 NRL Grand Final loss to Souths at centre. On 10 July 2018, Morris signed a two-year deal to join Cronulla-Sutherland starting in 2019 due to the salary cap crisis at Canterbury where the club needed to offload players. Morris was in talks with the Gold Coast Titans but ultimately decided to join Cronulla as he would have a chance to play under coach Shane Flanagan.

== Cronulla-Sutherland ==
Morris made his first appearance for Cronulla in round 1 of the 2019 NRL season against Newcastle which ended in a 14–8 loss. Morris scored his first and second try for the club against North Queensland in round 3 as Cronulla won 42–16.

Morris was selected to play for New South Wales in the 2019 State of Origin series. Morris played in Game 1 which New South Wales lost 18–14 at Suncorp Stadium. Morris was subsequently dropped from the New South Wales team by coach Brad Fittler for the second game.

In round 16 against Brisbane, Morris scored a hat-trick but it was ultimately not enough as Cronulla lost the match 24–22 at Shark Park. In Round 23 against the New Zealand Warriors, Morris scored 2 tries as Cronulla won the match 42–16.

Morris played 23 games for Cronulla in the 2019 NRL season as the club finished 7th on the table and qualified for the finals. Morris scored a try in the club's elimination final defeat against Manly at Brookvale Oval. Morris finished the year as Cronulla's top try scorer with 15 tries.

In February 2020, it was reported by the media that Morris had handed in a transfer request to the Cronulla board citing that he wished to join his brother Brett at the Sydney Roosters. Morris spoke to the media saying “I spoke to the boys at Cronulla and I know the timing isn’t ideal. It’s not because I’m unhappy with any of the boys at the Sharks, But this is a unique opportunity. My brother isn’t just any old mate, this is the bloke who I started this journey with, “Now another opportunity has presented itself and I’d regret it for the rest of my life if I didn’t try and make it happen". On 11 March, the request was granted. The Cronulla club released a statement saying "The 33-year-old will be released following the Sharks round two match against the Melbourne Storm. After much internal discussion and following lengthy negotiations with the Sydney Roosters, the release request has been granted ultimately due to circumstances surrounding the Sharks salary cap, a situation which has been impacted by previous infringements." A transfer of up to $75,000 was also included by the Roosters to help alleviate the Sharks’ well-publicised salary cap issues.

== Sydney Roosters ==
In round 3 of the 2020 NRL season, Morris made his debut for the Sydney Roosters in their 28-12 win over rivals South Sydney.

In round 15, Morris scored two tries for the Sydney Roosters in a 38-16 victory over the Wests Tigers at Leichhardt Oval.

The following week, he scored two tries in a 58-12 victory over Brisbane at the Sydney Cricket Ground.

In the 2020 qualifying final, Morris scored two tries for the Sydney Roosters in a 29-28 loss against Penrith.

Morris made 17 appearances for the Sydney Roosters in the 2020 NRL season scoring 11 tries. However, premiership success once again eluded him as the club fell short of winning a third straight premiership losing to Canberra in the second week of the finals.

In round 2 of the 2021 NRL season, the Sydney Roosters defeated Wests Tigers 40-6. Following the game, Morris was sent a vile message on Instagram by 21-year old Koen Thwaite which read “F*** you dog c***, you f***ed up my multi, I’m out the front of leumeah stadium waiting for your bus to rock up, Wait till you walk out of the that [sic] back door, you won’t know what hit ya".

Morris later shared the message online saying "This stuff needs to stop". Australian betting company Sportsbet issued a statement later that day saying Thwaite had been banned for life from betting with their company.

In round 8 of the 2021 NRL season, Morris scored a hat-trick in the Sydney Roosters 38-4 victory over Newcastle. On 2 August 2021, it was announced that Morris would miss at least five weeks with a hamstring injured he suffered in the club's 28-0 victory over Parramatta. On 30 August 2021, Morris announced he would retire from rugby league following the conclusion of the 2021 NRL season.

== Honours ==
=== Individual ===
- 2x Dally M Centre of the Year: 2009, 2012
- Provan-Summons Medal: 2021

=== Club ===
- 2x NRL Grand Final Runner-Up: 2012, 2014
- 2012 NRL Minor Premiership Winners

=== New South Wales ===
- State of Origin Series Wins: 2014, 2019

=== Australia ===
- Rugby League World Cup squad: 2009, 2011
- Rugby League Four Nations squad: 2013
