= Dan Hunt =

Australian rugby league footballer

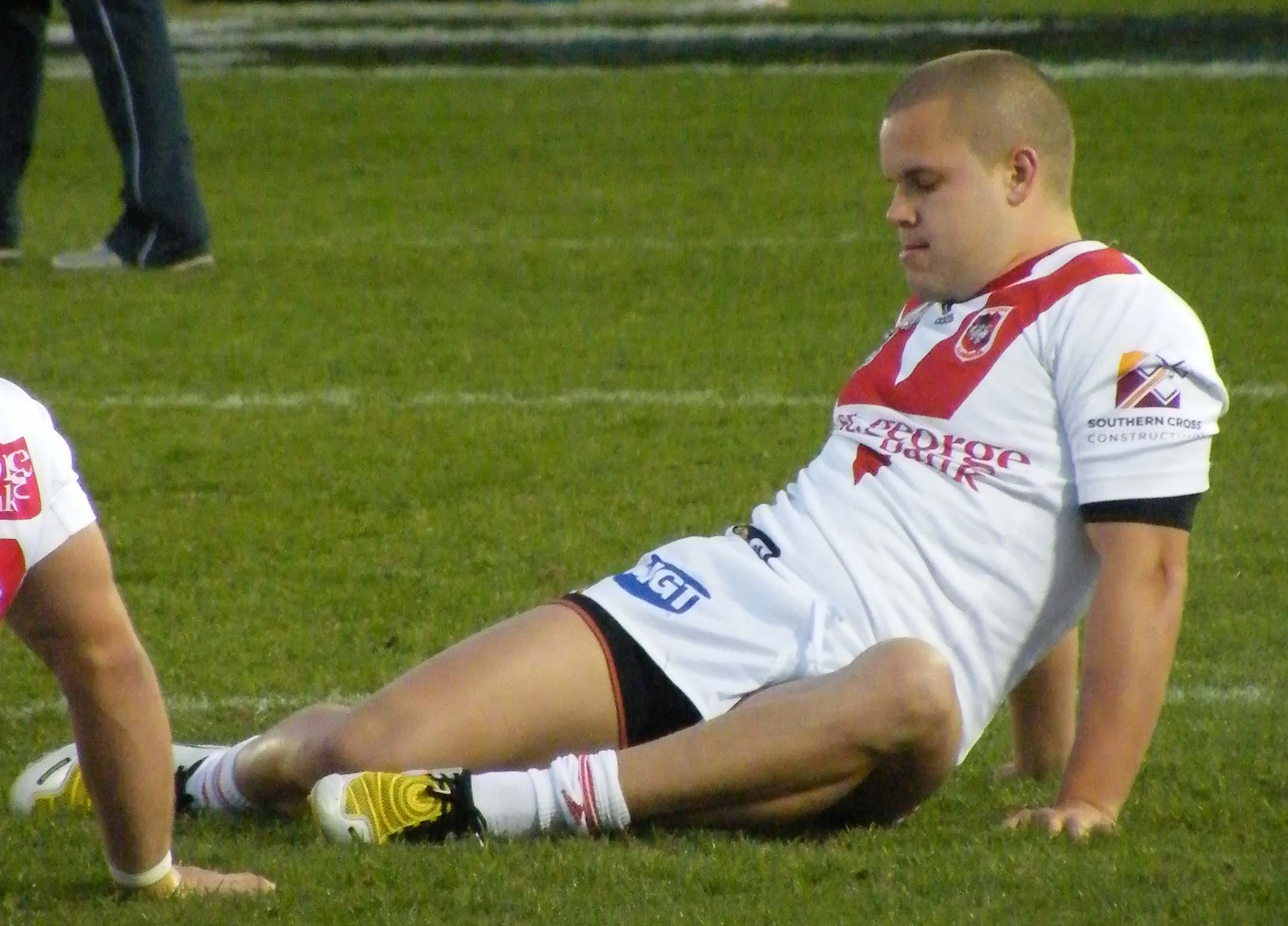

Personal information
- Full name: Daniel Hunt
- Born: 8 September 1986 (age 40) Sydney, New South Wales, Australia

Playing information
- Height: 185 cm (6 ft 1 in)
- Weight: 106 kg (16 st 10 lb)
- Position: Prop
Club
Years	Team	Pld	T	G	FG	P
2007–14	St. George Illawarra	151	8	0	0	32
Representative
Years	Team	Pld	T	G	FG	P
2011	NSW Country	1	0	0	0	0
2012	Prime Minister's XIII	1	0	0	0	0

Dan Hunt (born 8 September 1986 in Sydney, New South Wales) is an Australian former professional rugby league footballer who played for the St. George Illawarra Dragons in the National Rugby League competition. His position of choice was as a prop.

== Playing career ==
Hunt made his first grade debut in Round 1 of 2007 against the Gold Coast Titans

In 2010, Hunt was unfortunate to not play a part in the 2010 NRL Premiership due to an Achilles tendon injury sustained in the warmup of the round 11 match against the Canberra Raiders at WIN Stadium.

On 8 February 2011, it was confirmed that Hunt had agreed to a contract extension that would keep him at the St. George Illawarra Dragons until the end of 2013.

On 29 July 2015, Hunt announced his retirement from rugby league due to injury.
