= Ben Creagh =

Australia international rugby league footballer

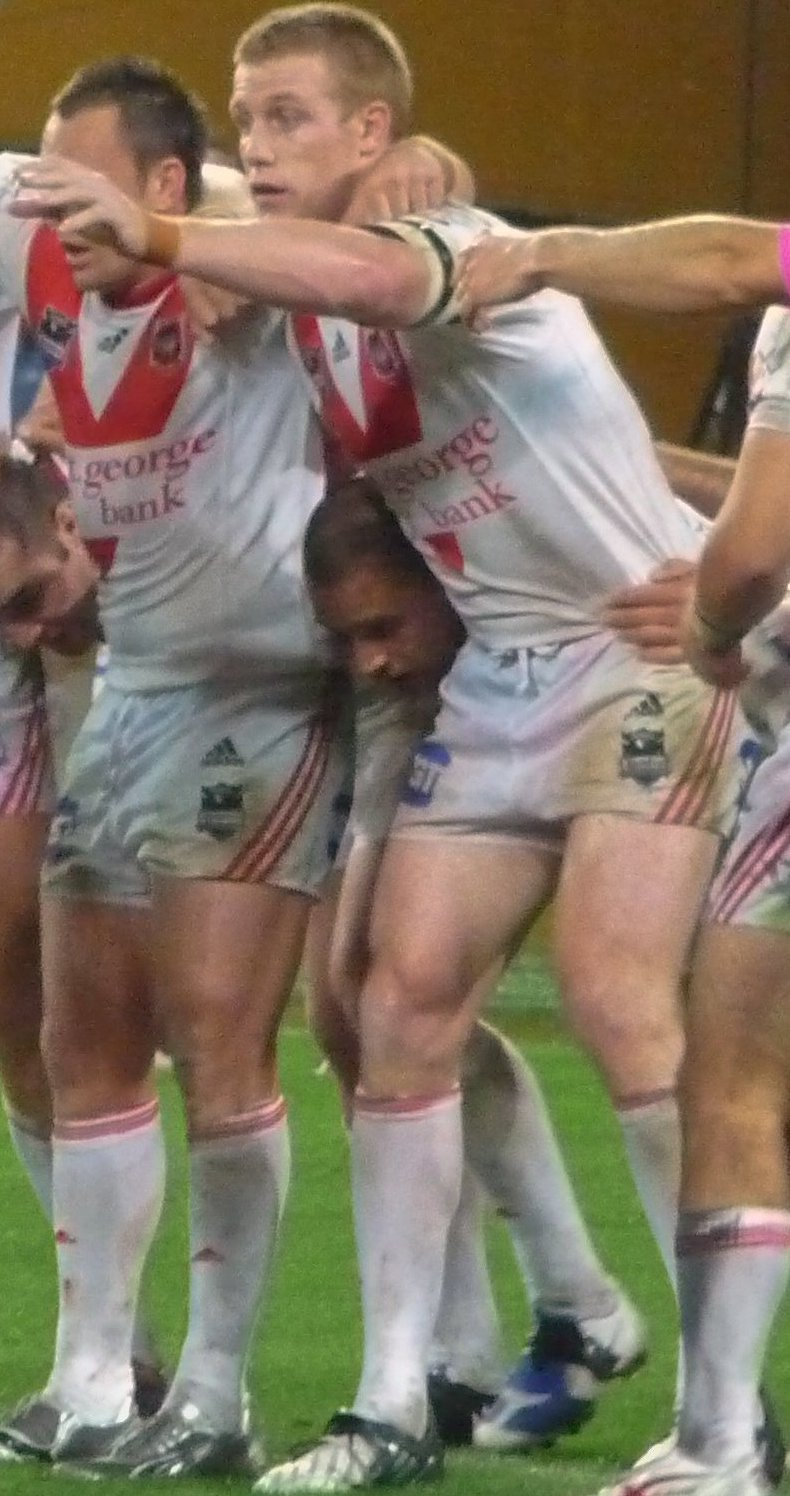

Personal information
- Full name: Benjamin Creagh
- Born: 6 February 1985 (age 41) Blacktown, New South Wales, Australia

Playing information
- Height: 191 cm (6 ft 3 in)
- Weight: 103 kg (16 st 3 lb)
- Position: Second-row, Prop, Lock
Club
Years	Team	Pld	T	G	FG	P
2003–16	St George Illawarra	270	54	0	0	216
Representative
Years	Team	Pld	T	G	FG	P
2005–12	NSW Country	6	0	0	0	0
2005–11	Australia	2	0	0	0	0
2009–12	New South Wales	11	4	0	0	16

Benjamin Creagh (born 6 February 1985) is an Australian former professional rugby league footballer who co-captained the St George Illawarra Dragons of the National Rugby League. An Australian international and New South Wales State of Origin representative forward, he played his whole NRL career with the Dragons, with whom he won the 2010 NRL Premiership.

== Early years ==
Creagh was born in Blacktown in Greater Western Sydney on 6 February 1985. In high school, Edmund Rice College in Wollongong, he excelled at basketball and rugby league. He later had the choice of joining the Wollongong Hawks NBL side or the St George Illawarra Dragons.

== Playing career ==
Creagh joined National Rugby League club St. George Illawarra and made his premiership debut in round 22 of the 2003 NRL season, against the New Zealand Warriors at Oki Jubilee Oval on 10 August 2003. He was chosen to play for the Australian team for the test against France in 2005.

In August, 2008, Creagh was named in the preliminary 46-man Kangaroos squad for the 2008 Rugby League World Cup. He was selected for Country in the City vs Country match on 8 May 2009. In May 2009, he was named in the 17-man squad to represent New South Wales in the opening State of Origin match, held in Melbourne on 3 June 2009. He scored a try on this debut for NSW. On 14 May 2009, he officially signed to stay with the Dragons until the end of 2013. In game three of the 2009 State of Origin series Creagh was sin binned for pushing Justin Hodges in the back.

Creagh capped a memorable 2010 by winning the 2010 NRL Grand Final, making more metres than any forward on the park; 149 metres. In the annual club awards night, Creagh was named Dragons Player of the Year. This was the third time he had received the award. In 2012, Creagh set the record for most appearances for New South Wales Country, playing in his sixth game.

St. George Illawarra announced on 18 August 2016 that Creagh was to retire at the conclusion of the 2016 NRL season. At the time, he was the second most capped player in the club's history with 270 first grade games, behind Ben Hornby who played in 273 games.

== Post playing ==
In 2024, Creagh was made a life member of the St. George Illawarra Dragons. On 6 November 2025, the Dragons announced that Creagh would step down from the board and become the club's Chief Operating Officer.
