= 2011 New Zealand Warriors season =

New Zealand Warriors 17th first-grade season

- NRL rank: 6th
- 2011 record: Wins: 16; draws: 0; losses: 12
- Points scored: For: 504; against: 393

Team information
- CEO: Wayne Scurrah
- Coach: Ivan Cleary
- Assistant coach: Tony Iro
- Captain: Simon Mannering
- Stadium: Mt Smart Stadium
- Avg. attendance: 13,842

Top scorers
- Tries: Manu Vatuvei (12)
- Goals: James Maloney (82)
- Points: James Maloney (206)
← 2010	2012 →

The New Zealand Warriors 2011 season was the New Zealand Warriors 17th first-grade season. The club competed in Australasia's National Rugby League. The coach of the team is Ivan Cleary while Simon Mannering is the club's captain. The Warriors lost to the Manly Sea Eagles 10-24 in the 2011 NRL Grand Final. The Junior Warriors won the Toyota Cup for the second consecutive year while the Auckland Vulcans finished second in the NSW Cup.

The finals form of the Warriors in 2011 increased the NRL's television audience in New Zealand by 29 per cent this year.

== Milestones ==
- 12 February – All Stars Match: Feleti Mateo represents the NRL All Stars and Joel Moon represents the Indigenous All Stars in the pre-season All Stars Match.
- 16 April – Round 6: Micheal Luck played in his 200th National Rugby League match.
- 4 June – Round 13: Lewis Brown played in his 50th match for the club.
- 8 July – Round 18: Jacob Lillyman played in his 50th match for the club.
- 15 July – Round 19: Aaron Heremaia played in his 50th National Rugby League match.
- 24 July – Round 20: Shaun Berrigan played in his 200th National Rugby League match.
- 3 September – Round 26: Joel Moon played in his 50th match for the club.
- 10 September – Qualifying final: Kevin Locke played in his 50th match for the club.
- 24 September – Preliminary final: James Maloney played in his 50th match for the club.

== Jersey and sponsors ==

In 2011 the Warriors jerseys were again made by Canterbury of New Zealand. They retained their black and white home and away jerseys originally released in 2009. They will wear a special all-black jersey with silver ferns around the logo for the Eden Park match. During the Heritage Round the Warriors wore a jersey based on the New Zealand Flag. Both special jerseys were worn again later in the season.

The Junior Warriors have their own jersey in 2011, designed by Daryl John, who won a competition run by sponsors Vodafone and Canterbury of New Zealand to design a New Jersey for the team.

Vodafone New Zealand were again the naming rights sponsor of the Warriors in 2011.

SKYCITY joined as a major sponsor for 2011, becoming the 'Home of the Vodafone Warriors'.

== Fixtures ==
The Warriors opened the season by hosting the Parramatta Eels at Eden Park in Auckland. This was the first time that the Warriors played a home match away from Mount Smart Stadium. The remaining 11 home games were played at Mount Smart Stadium, their only home ground since they entered the competition in 1995.

=== Pre-season training ===
The main squad returned to training on 15 November 2010 to start preparing for the 2011 season. Players involved in the 2010 Four Nations and other representative matches returned to training later.

=== Pre-season matches ===
A fourth match was added to the Warriors schedule to raise money for the West Coast region after the Pike River Mine disaster. In a joint partnership with the NZRL, NRL and Newcastle Knights, all money raised was donated to the Pike River mining relief fund and the West Coast Rugby League. The teams arrived early on 3 February to carry out community appearances in the region.

The final trial match against the Manly-Warringah Sea Eagles was also later made a fundraiser match, with North Harbour Stadium donating all profits of the match to the February 2011 Christchurch earthquake victims.

Date	Round	Opponent	Venue	Result	Score	Tries	Goals	Attendance	Report
5 February	Trial 1	Newcastle Knights	Wingham Park, Greymouth	Draw	22-22	Fisiiahi (2), Tupou, Godinet	Inu (3)	6,500	
12 February	Trial 2	Parramatta Eels	Rotorua International Stadium, Rotorua	Win	24-4	Fisiiahi (2), Vatuvei, Inu, Brown	Inu (2)	8,600	
19 February	Trial 3	Burleigh Bears	Toll Stadium, Whangārei	Win	30-0	Locke (2), Inu, Aranga, Fisiiahi, Mara	Maloney (2), Inu (1)	8,500	
26 February	Trial 4	Manly-Warringah Sea Eagles	North Harbour Stadium, Auckland	Loss	12-14	Matulino, Locke	Maloney (2)	14,000	

=== Regular season ===
Date	Round	Opponent	Venue	Result	Score	Tries	Goals	Attendance	Report
12 March	Round 1	Parramatta Eels	Eden Park, Auckland	Loss	18-24	Ropati (2), Brown	Maloney (3)	38,412	
19 March	Round 2	Wests Tigers	Leichhardt Oval, Sydney	Loss	12-20	Mannering, Inu	Seymour (2)	13,161	
27 March	Round 3	St George-Illawarra Dragons	Mt Smart Stadium, Auckland	Loss	12-25	Matulino, Berrigan	Maloney (2)	11,651	
3 April	Round 4	Cronulla-Sutherland Sharks	Owen Delany Park, Taupō	Win	26-18	Fisiiahi (2), Maloney, Inu	Maloney (5)	8,680	
8 April	Round 5	Sydney Roosters	Mt Smart Stadium, Auckland	Win	24-12	Inu, Brown, Hohaia, Berrigan	Maloney (4)	13,312	
16 April	Round 6	Manly-Warringah Sea Eagles	Brookvale Oval, Sydney	Loss	10-20	Brown, Taylor	Maloney (1)	8,680	
24 April	Round 7	Melbourne Storm	AAMI Park, Melbourne	Win	18-14	Inu, Luck, Lillyman	Maloney (3)	22,694	
1 May	Round 8	Penrith Panthers	Mt Smart Stadium, Auckland	Win	26-18	Locke (2), Inu, Hohaia	Maloney (4)	11,412	
8 May	Round 9	Gold Coast Titans	Skilled Park, Gold Coast	Win	34-14	Maloney (2), Brown, Mannering, Taylor, Vatuvei	Maloney (5)	17,285	
15 May	Round 10	Newcastle Knights	EnergyAustralia Stadium, Newcastle	Win	25-16	Hohaia (2), Vatuvei, Maloney	Maloney (4 & FG)	18,158	
22 May	Round 11	South Sydney Rabbitohs	Mt Smart Stadium, Auckland	Win	12-6	Seymour, Inu	Maloney (2)	16,872	
	Round 12	Bye							
4 June	Round 13	Sydney Roosters	Sydney Football Stadium, Sydney	Loss	6-13	Mannering	Maloney (1)	10,116	
12 June	Round 14	Wests Tigers	Mt Smart Stadium, Auckland	Loss	22-26	Vatuvei (2), Johnson, Inu, Locke	Maloney (1)	15,889	
18 June	Round 15	North Queensland Cowboys	Dairy Farmers Stadium, Townsville	Loss	10-30	Johnson, Maloney	Maloney (1)	16,081	
26 June	Round 16	Melbourne Storm	Mt Smart Stadium, Auckland	Loss	8-16	Hohaia	Maloney (2)	13,362	
	Round 17	Bye							
8 July	Round 18	Gold Coast Titans	Mt Smart Stadium, Auckland	Win	22-6	Vatuvei, Berrigan, Tupou, Mannering	Maloney (3)	10,780	
15 July	Round 19	Canterbury-Bankstown Bulldogs	Mt Smart Stadium, Auckland	Win	36-12	Heremaia (2), Hohaia, Taylor, Maloney, Mateo	Maloney (6)	12,012	
24 July	Round 20	South Sydney Rabbitohs	ANZ Stadium, Sydney	Win	48-16	Vatuvei (3), Moon (2), Johnson, Tupou, Maloney, Godinet	Maloney (6)	11,208	
31 July	Round 21	Canberra Raiders	Mt Smart Stadium, Auckland	Win	29-10	Vatuvei, Maloney, Sam Rapira, Tupou, Moon, Berrigan	Maloney (2 & FG)	14,731	
6 August	Round 22	Brisbane Broncos	Suncorp Stadium, Brisbane	Loss	20-21	Johnson, Berrigan, Locke	Maloney (4)	31,000	
13 August	Round 23	Newcastle Knights	Mount Smart Stadium, Auckland	Win	20-12	Berrigan, Johnson, Mannering, Mateo	Maloney (2)	13,279	
20 August	Round 24	Penrith Panthers	Penrith Stadium, Sydney	Win	26-12	Matulino, Vatuvei, Johnson, Locke	Maloney (5)	11,644	
28 August	Round 25	St George-Illawarra Dragons	WIN Stadium, Illawarra	Loss	22-26	Inu, Mateo, Locke, Tupou	Maloney (3)	15,732	
3 September	Round 26	North Queensland Cowboys	Mt Smart Stadium, Auckland	Win	18-6	Inu (2), Hohaia	Maloney (3)	20,082	

=== Finals ===
Qualifying finals
1	Melbourne	18
8	Newcastle	8
2	Manly	42
7	North Queensland	8
3	Brisbane	40
6	New Zealand	10
4	Wests	21
5	St. George Illawarra	12

Semifinals
4W	Wests	20
2L	New Zealand	22
3W	Brisbane	13
1L	St. George Illawarra	12

Preliminary finals
1W	Melbourne	12
New Zealand	20
2W	Manly	26
Brisbane	14

Final
Manly	24
New Zealand	10

Date	Round	Opponent	Venue	Result	Score	Tries	Goals	Attendance	Report
10 September	Qualifying final	Brisbane Broncos	Suncorp Stadium, Brisbane	Loss	10-40	Mateo, Vatuvei	Maloney (1)	48,943	
16 September	Semifinal	Wests Tigers	Sydney Football Stadium, Sydney	Win	22-20	Mateo, Maloney, Hohaia, Inu	Maloney (3)	27,109	
24 September	Preliminary final	Melbourne Storm	AAMI Park, Melbourne	Win	20-12	Brown, Maloney, Tupou	Maloney (4)	28,580	
2 October	Grand final	Manly Sea Eagles	ANZ Stadium, Sydney	Loss	10-24	Taylor, Vatuvei	Maloney (1)	81,988	

=== Grand Final ===
Manly Warringah Sea Eagles	Position	New Zealand Warriors
Brett Stewart	Fullback	Kevin Locke
Michael Robertson	Wing	Bill Tupou
Jamie Lyon (c)	Centre	Lewis Brown
Steve Matai	Centre	Krisnan Inu
Will Hopoate	Wing	Manu Vatuvei
Kieran Foran	Five-eighth	James Maloney
Daly Cherry-Evans	Halfback	Shaun Johnson
Joe Galuvao	Prop	15 Russell Packer
Matt Ballin	Hooker	14 Lance Hohaia
Brent Kite	Prop	Jacob Lillyman
Anthony Watmough	2nd Row	17 Elijah Taylor
Tony Williams	2nd Row	Simon Mannering (c)
Glenn Stewart	Lock	Micheal Luck
Shane Rodney	Interchange	8 Sam Rapira
Jamie Buhrer	Interchange	9 Aaron Heremaia
George Rose	Interchange	11 Feleti Mateo
Darcy Lussick	Interchange	16 Ben Matulino
Des Hasler	Coach	Ivan Cleary

== Ladder ==
2011 NRL Telstra Premiership
Pos.	Team	Pld	W	D	L	B	PF	PA	PD	Pts
1	Melbourne Storm	24	19	0	5	2	521	308	213	42
2	Manly Warringah Sea Eagles (P)	24	18	0	6	2	539	331	208	40
3	Brisbane Broncos	24	18	0	6	2	511	372	139	40
4	Wests Tigers	24	15	0	9	2	519	430	89	34
5	St. George Illawarra Dragons	24	14	1	9	2	483	341	142	33
6	New Zealand Warriors	24	14	0	10	2	504	393	111	32
7	North Queensland Cowboys	24	14	0	10	2	532	480	52	32
8	Newcastle Knights	24	12	0	12	2	478	443	35	28
9	Canterbury-Bankstown Bulldogs	24	12	0	12	2	449	489	-40	28
10	South Sydney Rabbitohs	24	11	0	13	2	531	562	-31	26
11	Sydney Roosters	24	10	0	14	2	417	500	-83	24
12	Penrith Panthers	24	9	0	15	2	430	517	-87	22
13	Cronulla-Sutherland Sharks	24	7	0	17	2	428	557	-129	18
14	Parramatta Eels	24	6	1	17	2	385	538	-153	17
15	Canberra Raiders	24	6	0	18	2	423	623	-200	16
16	Gold Coast Titans	24	6	0	18	2	363	629	-266	16

== Squad ==
The Warriors used thirty players during the season. Eight players made their debut for the club, including five who made their NRL debuts.

No.	Name	Position	Warriors debut	App	T	G	FG	Pts
99	Lance Hohaia	UB	6 April 2002	22	8	0	0	32
108	Jerome Ropati	CE / FE	31 August 2003	3	2	0	0	8
115	Manu Vatuvei	WG	23 May 2004	19	12	0	0	48
125	Simon Mannering	CE	26 June 2005	28	5	0	0	20
126	Micheal Luck	SR	12 March 2006	26	1	0	0	4
131	Sam Rapira	PR	20 May 2006	20	1	0	0	4
141	Russell Packer	PR	4 May 2008	27	0	0	0	0
142	Ben Matulino	SR	14 June 2008	28	2	0	0	8
145	Joel Moon	CE	14 March 2009	11	3	0	0	12
146	Jacob Lillyman	PR	14 March 2009	26	1	0	0	4
149	Ukuma Ta'ai	SR	22 March 2009	10	0	0	0	0
151	Lewis Brown	SR	3 May 2009	22	5	0	0	20
152	Kevin Locke	FB/WG	31 May 2009	24	6	0	0	24
153	Aaron Heremaia	HK	31 May 2009	24	2	0	0	8
154	Isaac John	HB	19 July 2009	1	0	0	0	0
157	Brett Seymour	HB	14 March 2010	9	1	2	0	8
156	James Maloney	HB	14 March 2010	27	10	82	2	206
158	Jeremy Latimore	PR	14 March 2010	8	0	0	0	0
159	Sione Lousi	SR	14 March 2010	2	0	0	0	0
160	Bill Tupou	WG	4 April 2010	17	5	0	0	20
161	Mataupu Poching	PR	15 May 2010	0	0	0	0	0
162	Alehana Mara	HK	21 August 2010	7	0	0	0	0
163	Glen Fisiiahi	FB	12 March 2011	4	2	0	0	8
164	Feleti Mateo	SR	12 March 2011	28	5	0	0	20
165	Shaun Berrigan	HK	12 March 2011	19	6	0	0	24
166	Krisnan Inu	CE	19 March 2011	18	11	0	0	44
167	Elijah Taylor	FE	3 April 2011	21	4	0	0	16
168	Shaun Johnson	HB	4 June 2011	16	6	0	0	24
169	Steve Rapira	SR	4 June 2011	5	0	0	0	0
170	Pita Godinet	HB	24 July 2011	4	1	0	0	4

== Staff ==
- Chief executive officer: Wayne Scurrah
- General manager: Don Mann Jr
- Recruitment and development manager: Dean Bell
- High performance manager: Craig Walker
- High performance assistant: Ruben Wiki
- Medical services manager: John Mayhew
- Welfare and education manager: Jerry Seuseu
- Media and communications manager: Richard Becht

=== NRL staff ===
- NRL head coach: Ivan Cleary
- NRL assistant coach: Tony Iro
- NRL assistant coach: David Fairleigh
- NRL trainer: Dayne Norton
- NRL physiotherapist: Hamish Craighead

=== NYC staff ===
- NYC head coach & assistant NRL coach: John Ackland
- NYC assistant coach: Frank Harold
- NYC trainer: Andrew Souter
- Development coach: Ricky Henry

== Transfers ==
=== Gains ===
Player	Previous club	Length	Notes
Krisnan Inu	Parramatta Eels	2013	
Feleti Mateo	Parramatta Eels	2013	
Steve Rapira	North Queensland Cowboys	2012, with option	
Shaun Berrigan	Hull	2011, with option	

=== Losses ===
Player	Club	Notes
Brent Tate	North Queensland Cowboys	
Patrick Ah Van	Bradford Bulls	
Siuatonga Likiliki	Newcastle Knights	
Steve Price	Retired	
Jesse Royal	Retired	
Ian Henderson	Catalans Dragons	
Wade McKinnon	Wests Tigers (Mid-Season 2010)	
Elijah Niko	Melbourne Storm	
Nafe Seluini	Penrith Panthers	
Mark Ioane	Canberra Raiders	

=== Re-signings ===
Playerb	Length	Notes
Sione Lousi	2013 + option	
Sam Lousi	2013	
Glen Fisiiahi	2015	
Sam Rapira	2012	

== Other teams ==
In 2011, the Junior Warriors again competed in the Toyota Cup while senior players who were not required for the first team played with the Auckland Vulcans in the NSW Cup.

=== 2011 Auckland Vulcans ===
The Auckland Vulcans were coached by former Warrior, Richie Blackmore. The Vulcans lost the NSW Cup Grand Final to the Canterbury-Bankstown Bulldogs 28-30.

Grand Final Team: Glen Fisiiahi, Willie Peace, Sione Lousi, Ivan Penehe, Niuvao Taka; Brett Seymour, Pita Godinet; James Gavet, Alehana Mara, Jeremy Latimore; Ukuma Ta'ai, Matt Robinson; Isaac John (c). Interchange: Darin Kingi, Upu Poching, Steve Rapira, Anthony Gelling.

On 18 February the Vulcans announced the following eight-man squad, with a six-man reserve squad. The squad was topped up with Warriors squad members each week.

Upu Poching was the Player of the Year with Darin Kingi named as runner up. Willie Pearce Jnr was named the Rookie of the Year.

Full-time squad

Name	Position	2010 Club
Anthony Gelling	CE/SR	Sydney Roosters NYC
Darin Kingi	HK	Manurewa Marlins
Johnny Aranga	FB/WG	Mt Albert Lions
Peter-George Rata	PR/SR	Waicoa Bay Stallions
Sema Mataora	LK/HB	Otahuhu Leopards
Shaun Metcalf	CE/SR	Auckland Vulcans
Sonny Walker	WG/CE	Pukekohe Pythons
Tulson Caird	SR/LK	Te Atatu Roosters

Reserve squad

Name	Position	2010 Club
Atelea Nafetalai	CE/SR	Otahuhu Leopards
Joel Freeman	HK	Mt Albert Lions
Kitiona Pasene	PR/SR	Mt Albert Lions
Sione Nuivoa Taka	CE	Richmond Bulldogs
William Heta	LK/HB	Otahuhu Leopards
Willie Peace	WG/CE	Otara Scorpions

=== 2011 Junior Warriors ===
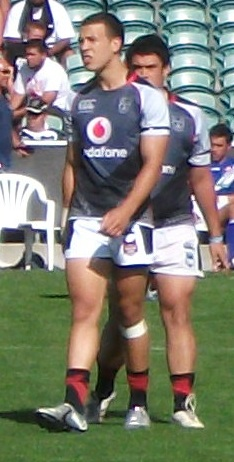
Junior Warriors player Carlos Tuimavave

The Junior Warriors won the Toyota Cup, defeating the North Queensland Cowboys 31-30 in extra time in the Grand Final.

Grand Final Team: George Maka, Adam Henry, Sosaia Feki, Konrad Hurrell, DJ Collier, Carlos Tuimavave, Jordan Meads, Ligi Sao, Eko Malu, Donald Tony, Samiuela Lousi, Ben Henry [c], Sebastine Ikahihifo. Siliva Havili, Agnatius Paasi, Siua Taukeiaho, Toka Likiliki, Siulongua Fotofili, John Palavi.

Along with players from the Melbourne Storm, Cronulla Sharks, Sydney Roosters and Manly Sea Eagles, the new members of the Junior Warriors attended a Toyota Cup Rookie Camp on 11–12 December 2010 which was held in New Zealand for the first time. The camp provided extensive training in media, cultural awareness, drugs and alcohol, social media, money matters, community work, social responsibility and personal presentation.

The Junior Warriors squad was again captained by Ben Henry and included Stephen Shennan, Omar Slaimankhel, Vili Lolohea, Sio Siua Taukeiaho, Konrad Hurrell, Sosaia Feki, James TePou, Carlos Tuimavave, Jordan Meads, Siliva Havili, Henry Chan-Ting, Sam Lousi, Sheldon Brown, Adam Henry, Toka Likiliki, Agnatius Paasi, Lance Su'a-Poe, Anthony Lama, Siulongua Fotofili, Eddie Aki, Donald Tony, Levi Holland, DJ Collier, Sebastine Ikahihifo, Nathaniel Peteru, Sirovai Makatoa, Simon Gibson, Ben Kingi, Falaniko Leilua, Kane Hannan, Eko Malu, John Palavi, Malakai Houma and Chris Ofanoa.

Omar Slaimankhel, Konrad Hurrell, Carlos Tuimavave and coach John Ackland were all named in the Toyota Cup team of the year. John Palavi was named the Vodafone NYC Player of the Year, Siliva Havili won the TNT NYC Young Player of the Year award and Donald Tony was named the DeWalt NYC Club Person of the Year.

2011 National Youth Competition season
Pos.	Team	Pld	W	D	L	B	PF	PA	PD	Pts
1	New Zealand Warriors (P)	24	19	1	4	2	851	494	+357	43
2	North Queensland Cowboys	24	17	0	7	2	758	509	+249	38
3	Cronulla-Sutherland Sharks	24	16	1	7	2	707	600	+107	37
4	Melbourne Storm	24	16	0	8	2	678	517	+161	36
5	Sydney Roosters	24	15	1	8	2	639	523	+116	35
6	Canterbury-Bankstown Bulldogs	24	14	0	10	2	659	458	+201	32
7	Wests Tigers	24	12	2	10	2	607	529	+78	30
8	Newcastle Knights	24	12	1	11	2	638	660	-22	29
9	Brisbane Broncos	24	11	2	11	2	752	551	+201	28
10	Penrith Panthers	24	12	0	12	2	558	709	-151	28
11	St. George Illawarra Dragons	24	10	2	12	2	562	594	-32	26
12	Parramatta Eels	24	10	1	13	2	547	556	-9	25
13	Canberra Raiders	24	8	1	15	2	683	749	-66	21
14	Gold Coast Titans	24	5	1	18	2	467	779	-312	15
15	South Sydney Rabbitohs	24	4	1	19	2	454	881	-427	13
16	Manly Warringah Sea Eagles	24	4	0	20	2	432	843	-411	12

== Awards ==
Simon Mannering won the Lion Red Player of the Year award, becoming only the second double winner of the award. Shaun Johnson won the Vodafone NRL Young Player of the Year Award while Jerome Ropati won the Canterbury of New Zealand Club Person of the Year Award and Kevin Locke won the Vodafone People's Choice Award.
