= 2013 New Zealand Warriors season =

Team information
- CEO: Wayne Scurrah
- Coach: Matthew Elliott
- Assistant coach: Andrew McFadden; Ricky Henry
- Captains: Simon Mannering; Sam Rapira
- Stadium: Mount Smart Stadium

Top scorers
- Tries: Manu Vatuvei (16)
- Goals: Shaun Johnson (67)
- Points: Shaun Johnson (177)
← 2012	2014 →

The 2013 New Zealand Warriors season was the nineteenth season in the club's history. Coached by Matthew Elliott and captained by Simon Mannering, the Warriors competed in the National Rugby League's 2013 Telstra Premiership. They finished the regular season in 11th (out of 16 teams), failing to make the finals for the second consecutive year.

== Milestones ==
- 12 October 2012: Matthew Elliot was appointed coach for the next two seasons.
- 16 January: Simon Mannering is reconfirmed as captain for the 2013 season.
- 9 February - All Stars match: Feleti Mateo and Shaun Johnson represent the NRL All Stars team and Dane Nielsen represents the Indigenous All Stars in the 2013 All Stars match.
- 9 March - Round 1: Dane Nielsen and Todd Lowrie made their debuts for the club.
- 24 March - Round 3: Ngani Laumape made his first grade debut.
- 19–21 April: The Warriors provided 7 players to the three representative matches held over the weekend. Ben Matulino, Elijah Taylor and Shaun Johnson played for New Zealand, Glen Fisiiahi and Siliva Havili played for Tonga, Carlos Tuimavave played for Samoa and Feleti Mateo played for City.
- 11 May - Round 9: Suaia Matagi made his first grade debut.
- 18 May - Round 10: Feleti Mateo plays in his 150th NRL match. The Warriors lose 6-62 to the Penrith Panthers, their largest ever loss in the club's history.
- 3 June - Round 12: Jacob Lillyman played in his 150th NRL match, Shaun Johnson played in his 50th NRL match and Dominique Peyroux made his debut for the club.
- 7 July - Round 17: Charlie Gubb made his debut for the club.
- 7 September - Round 26: Sio Siua Taukeiaho made his debut for the club. Jacob Lillyman played in his 100th match for the club.
- October - November: 15 players from the club participated in the World Cup: Kevin Locke, Manu Vatuvei, Thomas Leuluai, Shaun Johnson, Elijah Taylor, Simon Mannering, Ben Matulino (New Zealand), Pita Godinet, Suaia Matagi, Michael Sio (Samoa), Glen Fisiiahi, Konrad Hurrell, Siliva Havili (Tonga), Dominique Peyroux, Hikule'o Malu (Cook Islands).

== Jersey and sponsors ==
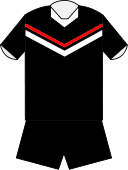

In 2013 the Warriors jerseys is again to be made by Canterbury of New Zealand.

The Warriors are the best selling club in the NRL for merchandise sales. In 2013 they had seven different playing shirts on sale.

Red Bull was announced as a new sponsor of the club, signing a three-year deal.

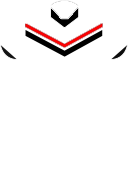

== Fixtures ==
=== Pre-season training ===
Pre-season training began on 5 November 2012. Australian wrestler and mixed martial arts fighter Brad Morris was employed on the Warriors coaching staff. The team was based at the Millennium Institute of Sport and Health and North Harbour Stadium during the pre-Christmas period. Four players joined the squad on pre-season trial contracts; Charlie Gubb, Suaia Matagi, Atelea Nafetalai, Nathaniel Peteru.

=== Pre-season matches ===
Date	Round	Opponent	Venue	Result	Score	Tries	Goals	Attendance	Report
9 February	Trial 1	Gold Coast Titans	Pizzey Park, Burleigh Heads	Loss	24-42	Godinet, Fusitua, Hurrell, Laumape, Nafetalai	Siejka (1), Godinet (1)		
16 February	Trial 2	Penrith Panthers	Waikato Stadium, Hamilton	Loss	18-32	Vatuvei, Laumape, Locke, Fishiiahi	Johnson (1)	12,000	
23 February	Trial 3	Brisbane Broncos	Forsyth Barr Stadium, Dunedin	Win	16-10	Vatuvei, Fisiiahi, Lowrie	Johnson (1), Godinet (1)	15,000	

=== Regular season ===
The Warriors will play ten home matches at Mount Smart Stadium, one at Eden Park and another at Westpac Stadium in Wellington. This will be the Warriors first home match held outside of Auckland.

Date	Round	Opponent	Venue	Result	Score	Tries	Goals	Attendance	Report
9 March	Round 1	Parramatta Eels	Parramatta Stadium, Sydney	Loss	10-40	Lillyman, Nielsen	Johnson (1)	13,351	
16 March	Round 2	Sydney Roosters	Eden Park, Auckland	Loss	14-16	Johnson, Godinet, Tupou	Johnson (1)	32,740	
24 March	Round 3	Cronulla-Sutherland Sharks	Shark Stadium, Sydney	Loss	4-28	Hurrell		12,183	
1 April	Round 4	North Queensland Cowboys	Mount Smart Stadium, Auckland	Win	20-18	Taylor, Hurrell, Johnson	Johnson (4)	10,572	
7 April	Round 5	South Sydney Rabbitohs	Mount Smart Stadium, Auckland	Loss	22-24	Matulino, Hurrell, Laumape, Godinet	Johnson (3)	13,513	
13 April	Round 6	Canberra Raiders	Canberra Stadium, Canberra	Loss	16-20	Vatuvei (2), Henry	Johnson (2)	9,699	
25 April	Round 7	Melbourne Storm	AAMI Park, Melbourne	Loss	18-28	Henry, Tupou, Johnson	Johnson (3)	25,480	
5 May	Round 8	Gold Coast Titans	Mount Smart Stadium, Auckland	Win	25-24	Vatuvei, Mateo, Tupou, Johnson, Henry	Johnson (2 & FG)	9,465	
11 May	Round 9	Canterbury-Bankstown Bulldogs	Westpac Stadium, Wellington	Loss	16-24	Vatuvei, Leuluai, Fisiiahi	Johnson (2)	30,116	
18 May	Round 10	Penrith Panthers	Centrebet Stadium, Sydney	Loss	6-62	Vatuvei	Henry (1)	9,386	
26 May	Round 11	Newcastle Knights	Mount Smart Stadium, Auckland	Win	28-12	Vatuvei, Leuluai, Rapira, Mannering, Taylor	Johnson (4)	9,257	
3 June	Round 12	Brisbane Broncos	Suncorp Stadium, Brisbane	Win	56-18	Vatuvei (2), Fisiiahi (2), Hurrell (2), Leuluai (2), Packer, Locke	Johnson (8)	21,259	
9 June	Round 13	Manly-Warringah Sea Eagles	Mount Smart Stadium, Auckland	Win	18-16	Taylor, Fishiiahi, Hurrell	Johnson (3)	11,143	
16 June	Round 14	Sydney Roosters	Allianz Stadium, Sydney	Win	23-12	Taylor, Laumape, Fishiiahi, Vatuvei	Mateo (2), Johnson (1 & FG)	11,040	
	Round 15	Bye							
30 June	Round 16	Brisbane Broncos	Mount Smart Stadium, Auckland	Win	18-16	Vatuvei, Taylor, Hurrell	Johnson (3)	15,515	
7 July	Round 17	South Sydney Rabbitohs	NIB Stadium, Perth	Loss	13-30	Mannering, Hurrell	Johnson (2 & FG)	20,221	
	Round 18	Bye							
19 July	Round 19	Wests Tigers	Leichhardt Oval, Sydney	Win	24-14	Johnson (2), Hurrell, Mannering	Johnson (4)	11,436	
28 July	Round 20	Melbourne Storm	Mount Smart Stadium, Auckland	Win	30-22	Laumape (2), Leuluai, Hurrell, Locke	Johnson (5)	20,126	
3 August	Round 21	Cronulla-Sutherland Sharks	Mount Smart Stadium, Auckland	Loss	14-18	Vatuvei (2), Hurrell	Johnson (1)	15,209	
11 August	Round 22	Manly-Warringah Sea Eagles	Central Coast Stadium, Gosford	Loss	12-27	Laumape, Johnson	Johnson (2)	12,090	
18 August	Round 23	Penrith Panthers	Mount Smart Stadium, Auckland	Loss	24-28	Leuluai, Taylor, Matagi, Hurrell	Johnson (4)	11,596	
24 August	Round 24	Gold Coast Titans	Skilled Park, Gold Coast	Win	24-22	Ropati (2), Nielsen, Hurrell	Johnson (4)	15,786	
31 August	Round 25	Canberra Raiders	Mount Smart Stadium, Auckland	Win	50-16	Vatuvei (3), Johnson (3), Taylor, Mannering, Laumape	Johnson (7)	15,121	
7 September	Round 26	St. George-Illawarra Dragons	WIN Stadium, Wollongong	Loss	10-19	Taylor, Vatuvei	Johnson (1)	9,022	

== Ladder ==
2013 NRL season
Pos	Team	Pld	W	D	L	B	PF	PA	PD	Pts
1	Sydney Roosters (P)	24	18	0	6	2	640	325	+315	40
2	South Sydney Rabbitohs	24	18	0	6	2	588	384	+204	40
3	Melbourne Storm	24	16	1	7	2	589	373	+216	37
4	Manly Warringah Sea Eagles	24	15	1	8	2	588	366	+222	35
5	Cronulla-Sutherland Sharks	24	14	0	10	2	468	460	+8	32
6	Canterbury-Bankstown Bulldogs	24	13	0	11	2	529	463	+66	30
7	Newcastle Knights	24	12	1	11	2	528	422	+106	29
8	North Queensland Cowboys	24	12	0	12	2	507	431	+76	28
9	Gold Coast Titans	24	11	0	13	2	500	518	−18	26
10	Penrith Panthers	24	11	0	13	2	495	532	−37	26
11	New Zealand Warriors	24	11	0	13	2	495	554	−59	26
12	Brisbane Broncos	24	10	1	13	2	434	477	−43	25
13	Canberra Raiders	24	10	0	14	2	434	624	−190	24
14	St. George Illawarra Dragons	24	7	0	17	2	379	530	−151	18
15	Wests Tigers	24	7	0	17	2	386	687	−301	18
16	Parramatta Eels	24	5	0	19	2	326	740	−414	14

== Squad ==
No.	Name	Position	Warriors debut	App	T	G	FG	Pts
105	Thomas Leuluai	HB	2 May 2003	24	6	0	0	24
108	Jerome Ropati	CE	31 August 2003	4	2	0	0	8
115	Manu Vatuvei	WG	23 May 2004	19	16	0	0	64
125	Simon Mannering	SR	26 June 2005	23	4	0	0	16
131	Sam Rapira	PR	20 May 2006	22	1	0	0	4
141	Russell Packer	PR	4 May 2008	9	1	0	0	4
142	Ben Matulino	PR	14 June 2008	24	1	0	0	4
146	Jacob Lillyman	PR	14 March 2009	22	1	0	0	4
152	Kevin Locke	FB	31 May 2009	20	2	0	0	8
159	Sione Lousi	SR	14 March 2010	0	0	0	0	0
160	Bill Tupou	WG	4 April 2010	9	3	0	0	12
162	Alehana Mara	HK	21 August 2010	0	0	0	0	0
163	Glen Fisiiahi	FB	12 March 2011	11	5	0	0	20
164	Feleti Mateo	SR	12 March 2011	24	1	2	0	8
167	Elijah Taylor	SR	3 April 2011	23	8	0	0	32
168	Shaun Johnson	HB	4 June 2011	24	10	67	3	177
169	Steve Rapira	SR	4 June 2011	3	0	0	0	0
170	Pita Godinet	HB	24 July 2011	10	2	0	0	8
171	Ben Henry	SR	4 March 2012	7	3	1	0	14
172	Nathan Friend	HK	4 March 2012	21	0	0	0	0
173	Konrad Hurrell	CE	4 March 2012	20	13	0	0	52
175	Sam Lousi	SR	21 July 2012	0	0	0	0	0
176	Sebastine Ikahihifo	LK	28 July 2012	8	0	0	0	0
177	Carlos Tuimavave	FE	5 August 2012	3	0	0	0	0
178	Dane Nielsen	CE	9 March 2013	17	2	0	0	8
179	Todd Lowrie	SR	9 March 2013	21	0	0	0	0
180	Ngani Laumape	WG	24 March 2013	14	6	0	0	24
181	Suaia Matagi	PR	11 May 2013	11	1	0	0	4
182	Dominique Peyroux	CE	3 June 2013	13	0	0	0	0
183	Charlie Gubb	PR	7 July 2013	1	0	0	0	0
184	Sio Siua Taukeiaho	SR	7 September 2013	1	0	0	0	0

== Staff ==
- Chief executive officer: Wayne Scurrah
- General manager: Don Mann Jr
- General manager football operations: Dean Bell
- Medical services manager: John Mayhew
- Welfare and education manager: Jerry Seuseu
- Media and communications manager: Richard Becht

=== Coaching staff ===
- NRL head coach: Matthew Elliott
- NRL assistant coach: Andrew McFadden
- NRL assistant coach: Ricky Henry
- NYC head coach: John Ackland
- NYC assistant coach: Kelvin Wright
- Junior recruitment and pathways coach: Stacey Jones

=== Strength and Conditioning ===
- Strength and conditioning coach: Carl Jennings
- Strength and conditioning coach: Ruben Wiki
- Sports science manager: Brad Morris
- Rehab and speed coach: Dayne Norton
- Performance analyst: Adam Sadler

== Transfers ==
=== Gains ===
Player	Previous club	Length	Notes
Thomas Leuluai	Wigan Warriors	2013–2015	
Harry Siejka	Penrith Panthers	2013–20??	
Dane Nielsen	Melbourne Storm	2013–2015	
Todd Lowrie	Melbourne Storm	2013-2014	
Matthew Elliott	Sydney Roosters	2013-2014	Coach
Dominique Peyroux	Gold Coast Titans	2013-2015	

=== Losses ===
Player	Club	Notes
James Maloney	Sydney Roosters	
Lewis Brown	Penrith Panthers	
Micheal Luck	Retirement	
Ukuma Ta'ai	Huddersfield Giants	
Krisnan Inu	Canterbury-Bankstown Bulldogs	Left 24 May 2012
Omar Slaimankhel	Canon Eagles	

== Other teams ==
The Junior Warriors again competed in the Holden Cup while senior players who were not required for the first team played with the Auckland Vulcans in the NSW Cup.

=== Holden Cup Squad ===
In John Ackland's last season with the club, the Junior Warriors made the grand final, before losing 30-42 to the Penrith Panthers juniors.

Grand Final team: David Fusitua, Metia Lisati, Adam Tuimavave-Gerrard, Ngataua Hukatai, Viliami Lolohea, Tuimoala Lolohea, Mason Lino, James Taylor, Siliva Havili, Albert Vete, Michael Sio, Raymond Faitala-Mariner and David Bhana (c). Bench: Eko Malu, Sam Lisone, Kouma Samson, Solomone Kata.

Seventeen Junior Warriors attended an NRL rookie camp on 24 and 25 November 2012. They were Vincent Afoa, Katamiro Atera, Trent Bishop, Raymond Faitala-Mariner, Sione Feao, David Fusitua, Ngani Laumape, Mason Lino, Sam Lisone, Kouma Samson, Kurt Robinson, Lafu Feagaiga, Tama Koopu, Kenneth Maumalo, Eric Newbigging, Sam Cook and Esera Esera.

=== Vulcans squad ===
The Vulcans were coached by Willie Swann, who was assisted by Brent Gemmel.

The Vulcans made the finals, losing to the Wests Tigers 24-34 in an elimination final.

The 2013 squad was Aaron Nootai, Agnatius Paasi, Atelea Nafetalai, Daniel Palavi, Murray Iti, Nathaniel Peteru, Steve Waetford, Tangi Ropati and Zoram Watene. In addition, the Vulcans were able to select players contracted to the Warriors and not selected for first grade, including four under 20 players; Ngani Laumape, Siliva Havili, Trent Bishop and Visesio Setefano.

Suaia Matagi was named the player of the year, ahead of runner up Tangi Ropati. John Palavi was named the rookie of the year.

== Awards ==
Captain Simon Mannering won the Player of the Year award while Ngani Laumape won Rookie of the Year. The Clubman of the Year was Manu Vatuvei and Shaun Johnson won the People's Player of the Year, decided by public vote. Jerome Ropati was presented with a special Legacy Award.
