= 2012 New Zealand Warriors season =

- NRL rank: 14th
- 2012 record: Wins: 8; draws: 0; losses: 16
- Points scored: For: 497; against: 609

Team information
- CEO: Wayne Scurrah
- Coach: Brian McClennan; Tony Iro
- Assistant coach: Tony Iro
- Captains: Simon Mannering; Micheal Luck Manu Vatuvei
- Stadium: Mount Smart Stadium
- Avg. attendance: 15,257

Top scorers
- Tries: Manu Vatuvei (12); Shaun Johnson (12); Konrad Hurrell (12)
- Goals: James Maloney (67)
- Points: James Maloney (153)
← 2011	2013 →

The New Zealand Warriors 2012 season is the New Zealand Warriors 18th first-grade season. The club is competing in Australasia's National Rugby League. The coach of the team was Brian McClennan, until he was sacked on 21 August after Round 22, while Simon Mannering is the club's captain. Assistant Coach Tony Iro was appointed caretaker coach for the final two matches.

== Milestones ==
- 4 February – All Stars Match: Manu Vatuvei represents the NRL All Stars in the pre-season All Stars Match.
- 5 March – Round One: Ben Henry and Konrad Hurrell make their first grade debuts while Nathan Friend plays his first match for the Warriors.
- 24 March – Round Four: Simon Mannering played in his 150th NRL match and his 50th match as captain.
- 12 May – Round 10: Ukuma Ta'ai played in his 50th NRL match.
- 16 June – Round 15: Omar Slaimankhel made his first grade debut.
- 16 June – Round 15: Ben Matulino played in his 100th NRL match. He became the first player from the Toyota Cup to play 100 matches in the National Rugby League.
- 11 August – Round 23: Manu Vatuvei becomes the first player to score 100 tries for the club.
- 11 August – Round 23: Bill Tupou played in his 50th NRL match.
- 19 August – Round 24: Manu Vatuvei played in his 150th NRL match.
- 19 August – Round 24: Feleti Mateo played in his 50th match for the club.
- 2 September – Round 26: In Micheal Luck's last NRL match, the Warriors lost their eight straight match, a record for the club. The streak included two back-to-back losses involving comebacks of eighteen points or more, an NRL first.

== Jersey and sponsors ==
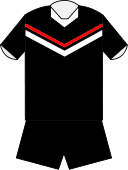

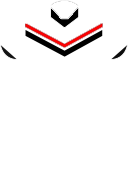

In 2012 the Warriors jerseys is again to be made by Canterbury of New Zealand. They were unveiled on 21 November 2011 at the first day of training. The jerseys feature a traditional rugby league "v" for the first time since 2003.

The Junior Warriors play in a red strip with a white away jersey.

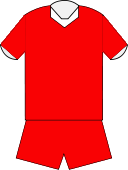

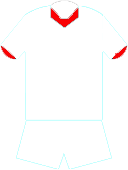

== Change of ownership ==
On 2 March owner Eric Watson announced that he had bought out the minority shareholders, including Mark Hotchin, and would form a new 50–50 venture with Owen Glenn to control the club.

== Fixtures ==
The Warriors opened the season by hosting a match at Eden Park in Auckland. This was only the second time that the Warriors have played a home match away from Mount Smart Stadium. The remaining 11 home games will be played at Mount Smart Stadium, their only home ground since they entered the competition in 1995.

=== Pre-season training ===
The main squad returned to training on 21 November 2011 to start preparing for the 2012 season. Players involved in the 2011 Four Nations and other representative matches returned to training later. Twenty three first graders were present on the first day of training.

=== Pre-season matches ===
North Harbour Stadium hosted a Warriors trial match for the tenth time. The Warriors also played a match in Whangārei.

Date	Round	Opponent	Venue	Result	Score	Tries	Goals	Attendance	Report
4 February	Trial 1	Gold Coast Titans	North Harbour Stadium, Auckland	Win	26–10	Hurrell, Brown, Johnson, Fisiiahi, Tupou	Maloney (2)	10,500	
11 February	Trial 2	South Sydney Rabbitohs	BCU International Stadium, Coffs Harbour	Win	22–14	Vatuvei (2), Mannering, Hurrell	Johnson (2), Maloney	5,376	
19 February	Trial 3	Sunshine Coast Sea Eagles	Toll Stadium, Whangārei	Win	68–10	Penehe (2), Matulino (2), Mara, Godinet, Ta'ai, Locke, Inu, Brown, Ropati, Fishiiahi, Henry	Inu (4), Locke (3), Henry	9,000	

=== Regular season ===
Date	Round	Opponent	Venue	Result	Score	Tries	Goals	Attendance	Report
4 March	Round 1	Manly-Warringah Sea Eagles	Eden Park, Auckland	Loss	20–26	Vatuvei (2), Johnson, Locke	Maloney (2)	37,502	
12 March	Round 2	Parramatta Eels	Parramatta Stadium, Sydney	Win	36–20	Tupou (2), Mateo, Hurrell, Maloney, Locke	Maloney (6)	12,000	
18 March	Round 3	Canterbury-Bankstown Bulldogs	Mount Smart Stadium, Auckland	Loss	18–32	Maloney, Lousi, Mateo	Maloney (3)	17,067	
24 March	Round 4	Gold Coast Titans	Mount Smart Stadium, Auckland	Win	26–6	Johnson (2), Taylor, Vatuvei, Mannering	Maloney (3)	12,915	
31 March	Round 5	Sydney Roosters	Sydney Football Stadium, Sydney	Loss	26–8	Ropati, Fisiiahi		13,021	
8 April	Round 6	Canberra Raiders	Canberra Stadium, Canberra	Loss	12–32	Henry, Maloney	Maloney (2)	10,800	
15 April	Round 7	South Sydney Rabbitohs	Mount Smart Stadium, Auckland	Win	44–22	Mannering (2), Henry, Brown, Ropati, Tupou, Ta'ai, Inu	Maloney (6)	15,378	
25 April	Round 8	Melbourne Storm	AAMI Park, Melbourne	Loss	14–32	Tupou (2), Brown	Maloney (1)	20,333	
5 May	Round 9	Brisbane Broncos	Mount Smart Stadium, Auckland	Win	30–20	Henry, Johnson, Taylor, Lillyman, Mateo	Maloney (5)	19,012	
12 May	Round 10	Sydney Roosters	Mount Smart Stadium, Auckland	Win	30–26	Hurrell (2), Johnson (2), Vatuvei	Maloney (5)	16,220	
18 May	Round 11	Wests Tigers	Leichhardt Oval, Sydney	Loss	22–24	Hurrell (2), Henry, Tupou	Maloney (3)	16,406	
	Round 12	Bye							
3 June	Round 13	Melbourne Storm	Mount Smart Stadium, Auckland	Loss	12–22	Hurrell, Vatuvei	Maloney (2)	20,487	
11 June	Round 14	Penrith Panthers	Centrebet Stadium, Sydney	Win	30–16	Vatuvei (2), Hurrell, Locke, Maloney	Maloney (5)	5,778	
16 June	Round 15	Cronulla-Sutherland Sharks	Toyota Stadium, Sydney	Loss	19–20	Hurrell, Locke, Johnson	Maloney (3 & FG)	9,271	
	Round 16	Bye							
1 July	Round 17	North Queensland Cowboys	Mount Smart Stadium, Auckland	Win	35–18	Henry (2), Hurrell, Lillyman, Friend, Brown	Maloney (5 & FG)	15,274	
8 July	Round 18	Gold Coast Titans	Skilled Park, Gold Coast	Win	32–14	Hurrell (3), Johnson, Locke, Matunlino	Maloney (4)	17,134	
13 July	Round 19	Brisbane Broncos	Suncorp Stadium, Brisbane	Loss	8–10	Locke, Vatuvei		32,148	
21 July	Round 20	Newcastle Knights	Mount Smart Stadium, Auckland	Loss	19–24	Johnson, Matulino, Friend	Maloney (3 & FG)	15,112	
29 July	Round 21	Manly-Warringah Sea Eagles	Patersons Stadium, Perth	Loss	22–24	Locke, Johnson, Brown, Vatuvei	Maloney (3)	20,095	
5 August	Round 22	Cronulla-Sutherland Sharks	Mount Smart Stadium, Auckland	Loss	4–45	Tupou		13,812	
11 August	Round 23	North Queensland Cowboys	Dairy Farmers Stadium, Townsville	Loss	12–52	Tuimavave, Vatuvei	Malony (2)	13,616	
19 August	Round 24	Penrith Panthers	Mount Smart Stadium, Auckland	Loss	16–18	Henry (2), Johnson	Malony (2)	11,000	
25 August	Round 25	St George-Illawarra Dragons	WIN Stadium, Wollongong	Loss	6–38	Johnson	Malony (1)	11,261	
2 September	Round 26	Canberra Raiders	Mount Smart Stadium, Auckland	Loss	42–22	Vatuvei (2), Matulino, Godinet	Henry (2), Maloney	11,455	

== Ladder ==
2012 NRL season
Pos	Team	Pld	W	D	L	B	PF	PA	PD	Pts
1	Canterbury-Bankstown Bulldogs	24	18	0	6	2	568	369	+199	40
2	Melbourne Storm (P)	24	17	0	7	2	579	361	+218	38
3	South Sydney Rabbitohs	24	16	0	8	2	559	438	+121	36
4	Manly Warringah Sea Eagles	24	16	0	8	2	497	403	+94	36
5	North Queensland Cowboys	24	15	0	9	2	597	445	+152	34
6	Canberra Raiders	24	13	0	11	2	545	536	+9	30
7	Cronulla-Sutherland Sharks	24	12	1	11	2	445	441	+4	29
8	Brisbane Broncos	24	12	0	12	2	481	447	+34	28
9	St. George Illawarra Dragons	24	11	0	13	2	405	438	-33	26
10	Wests Tigers	24	11	0	13	2	506	551	-45	26
11	Gold Coast Titans	24	10	0	14	2	449	477	-28	24
12	Newcastle Knights	24	10	0	14	2	448	488	-40	24
13	Sydney Roosters	24	8	1	15	2	462	626	-164	21
14	New Zealand Warriors	24	8	0	16	2	497	609	-112	20
15	Penrith Panthers	24	8	0	16	2	409	575	-166	20
16	Parramatta Eels	24	6	0	18	2	431	674	-243	16

== Squad ==
The Warriors used twenty nine players during the season. Seven players made their debut for the club, including six who were making their NRL debuts – all of these players were graduates from the Warriors Toyota Cup programme.

No.	Name	Position	Warriors debut	App	T	G	FG	Pts
108	Jerome Ropati	CE	31 August 2003	8	2	0	0	8
115	Manu Vatuvei	WG	23 May 2004	20	12	0	0	48
125	Simon Mannering	SR	26 June 2005	19	3	0	0	12
126	Micheal Luck	LK	12 March 2006	6	0	0	0	0
131	Sam Rapira	PR	20 May 2006	7	0	0	0	0
141	Russell Packer	PR	4 May 2008	24	0	0	0	0
142	Ben Matulino	PR	14 June 2008	22	3	0	0	12
146	Jacob Lillyman	PR	14 March 2009	16	2	0	0	8
149	Ukuma Ta'ai	SR	22 March 2009	12	1	0	0	4
151	Lewis Brown	SR	3 May 2009	24	4	0	0	16
152	Kevin Locke	FB/WG	31 May 2009	14	7	0	0	28
156	James Maloney	FE	14 March 2010	24	4	67	3	153
159	Sione Lousi	SR	14 March 2010	22	1	0	0	4
160	Bill Tupou	WG	4 April 2010	23	7	0	0	28
162	Alehana Mara	HK	21 August 2010	6	0	0	0	0
163	Glen Fisiiahi	FB	12 March 2011	4	1	0	0	4
164	Feleti Mateo	SR	12 March 2011	24	3	0	0	12
166	Krisnan Inu	WG/CE	19 March 2011	3	1	0	0	4
167	Elijah Taylor	SR	3 April 2011	23	2	0	0	8
168	Shaun Johnson	HB	4 June 2011	22	12	0	0	48
169	Steve Rapira	SR	4 June 2011	6	0	0	0	0
170	Pita Godinet	HB/HK	24 July 2011	4	1	0	0	4
171	Ben Henry	CE/SR	4 March 2012	24	8	2	0	36
172	Nathan Friend	HK	4 March 2012	17	2	0	0	8
173	Konrad Hurrell	CE	4 March 2012	17	12	0	0	48
174	Omar Slaimankhel	FB	16 June 2012	5	0	0	0	0
175	Sam Lousi	SR	21 July 2012	2	0	0	0	0
176	Sebastine Ikahihifo	LK	28 July 2012	4	0	0	0	0
177	Carlos Tuimavave	FE	5 August 2012	5	1	0	0	4

== Staff ==
- Chief executive officer: Wayne Scurrah
- General manager: Don Mann Jr
- Recruitment and development manager: Dean Bell
- High performance manager: Craig Walker
- High performance assistant: Ruben Wiki
- Medical services manager: John Mayhew
- Welfare and education manager: Jerry Seuseu
- Media and communications manager: Richard Becht

=== NRL staff ===
- NRL head coach: Brian McClennan, until 21 August 2012, replaced by Tony Iro.
- NRL assistant coach: Tony Iro
- Defence coach: Ruben Wiki
- Halves coach: Andrew Johns

=== NYC staff ===
- NYC head coach & assistant NRL coach: John Ackland
- Development coach: Willie Swann

== Transfers ==
=== Gains ===
Player	Previous club	Length	Notes
Nathan Friend	Gold Coast Titans	2013 with option	
Brian McClennan	Leeds Rhinos	2012–2013 with option	Coach

=== Losses ===
Player	Club	Notes
Lance Hohaia	St Helens R.F.C.	
Aaron Heremaia	Hull F.C.	
Brett Seymour	Hull F.C.	
Jeremy Latimore	St. George Illawarra Dragons	
Joel Moon	Salford City Reds	
Shaun Berrigan	Canberra Raiders	
Isaac John	Wakefield Trinity Wildcats	
Ivan Cleary	Penrith Panthers	Coach
Adam Henry	Sydney Roosters	
James Gavet	Canterbury-Bankstown Bulldogs	
Anthony Gelling	Wigan Warriors	
Sosaia Feki	Cronulla-Sutherland Sharks	

=== Mid-season Losses ===
Player	Club	Notes
Krisnan Inu	Canterbury-Bankstown Bulldogs	24 May

== Junior team ==
In 2012 the Junior Warriors competed in the Toyota Cup, while senior players who are not required for the first team play with the Auckland Vulcans in the NSW Cup.

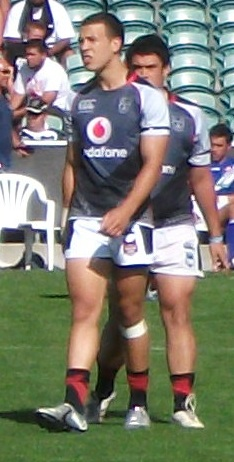
Junior Warriors player Carlos Tuimavave

New Zealand Warriors Under 20's
Toyota Cup squad		Coaching staff
Siulongoua Fotofili – PR; Siliva Havili – HK; Malakai Houma – LK; Falaniko Leilua – PR; Toka Likiliki – PR; Vili Lolohea – CE; Eko Malu – HB; Jordan Meads – HB; Chris Ofanoa – SR	John Palavi (c) – SR; Nathaniel Peteru – WG; Ligi Sao – PR; Visesio Setefano – SR; Omar Slaimankhel – FB; Donald Tony – PR; Honeti Tuha – SR; Carlos Tuimavave – FE; Sio Siua Taukeiaho – SR	Head coach: John Ackland; Legend: (c) Captain(s); (vc) Vice-captain(s); Updated: 24 November 2011; Source(s): Player Profiles

== Awards ==
Ben Matulino won the club's Player of the Year award. Ben Henry was named Young Player of the Year and Elijah Taylor was the clubman of the year. Konrad Hurrell was the Vodafone People's choice award winner.
