= 2010 New Zealand Warriors season =

- NRL rank: 5th
- 2010 record: Wins: 14; draws: 0; losses: 10
- Points scored: For: 539; against: 486

Team information
- CEO: Wayne Scurrah
- Coach: Ivan Cleary
- Assistant coach: Tony Iro
- Captains: Simon Mannering; Micheal Luck Brent Tate
- Stadium: Mt Smart Stadium
- Avg. attendance: 13,313

Top scorers
- Tries: Manu Vatuvei (20)
- Goals: James Maloney (73)
- Points: James Maloney (188)
← 2009	2011 →

The New Zealand Warriors 2010 season was the New Zealand Warriors 16th first-grade season. The club competed in Australasia's National Rugby League and finished fifth in regular season before being eliminated in the first round of the playoffs. The coach of the team was Ivan Cleary while Simon Mannering was the club's captain. The Warriors won the club championship award for having the best combined results between the first grade team and the under-20s. The Junior Warriors then went on to win the Toyota Cup grand final, the club's first grand final win in sixteen years.

In 2010 Warriors games were broadcast on New Zealand's Sky network averaged 181,200 viewers.

== Milestones ==
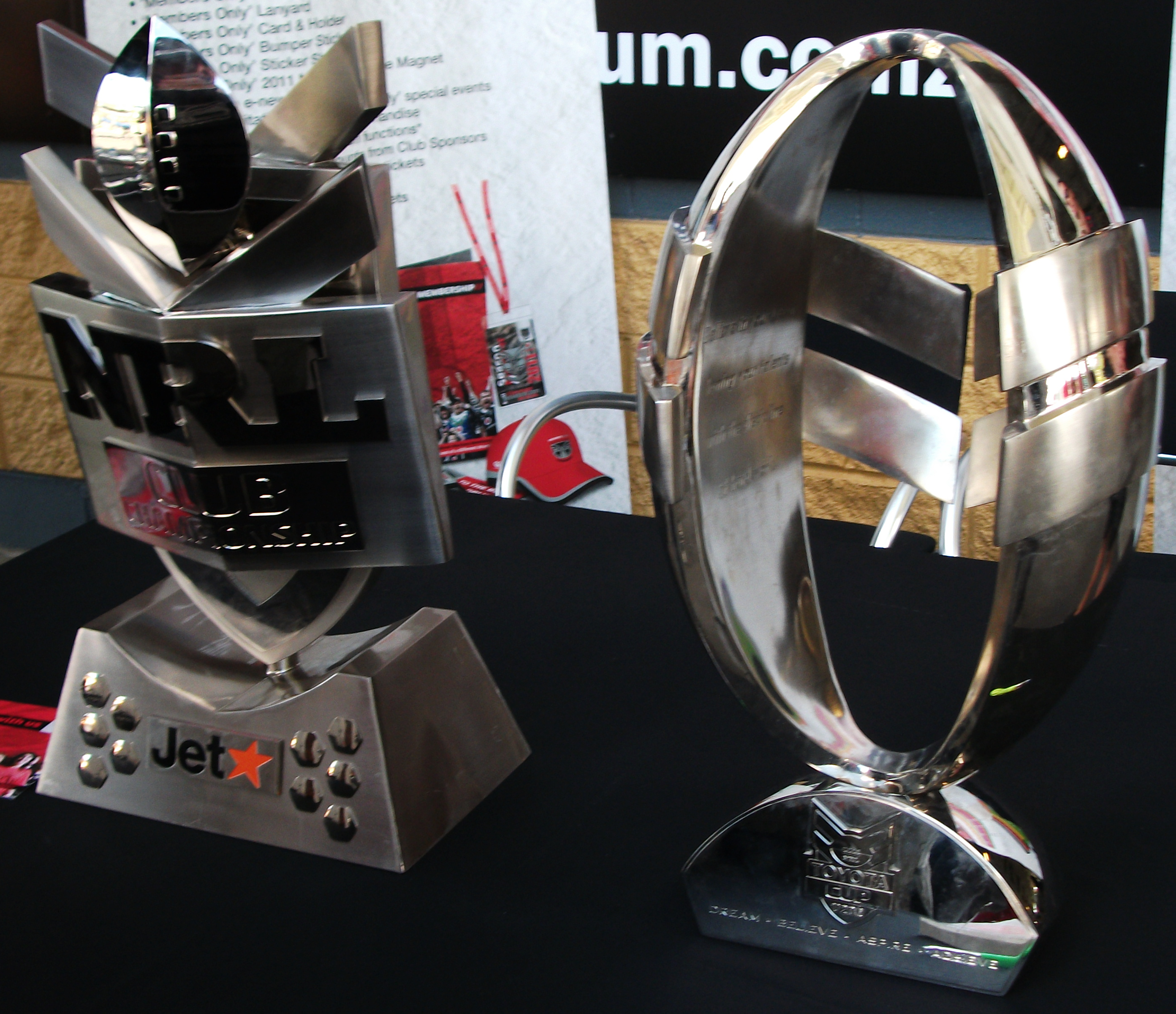
The Club Championship (left) and the Toyota Cup (right)

- 13 February – All Stars Match: Manu Vatuvei represents the NRL All Stars in the pre-season All Stars Match.
- 14 March – Round 1: Four players made their debuts for the club; Brett Seymour, James Maloney, Jeremy Latimore and Sione Lousi. Lousi also made his NRL debut.
- 20 March – Round 2: Micheal Luck plays in his 100th game for the club.
- 28 March – Round 3: James Maloney equals the points club scoring record by scoring 28 points in a match. The record was previously shared by Ivan Cleary and Gene Ngamu.
- 28 March – Round 3: Wade McKinnon played in his 50th game for the club.
- 4 April – Round 4: Bill Tupou made his debut for the club and his debut in the NRL.
- 18 April – Round 6: Ian Henderson played in his 50th game for the club.
- 15 May – Round 10: Mataupu Poching made his debut for the club and his debut in the NRL.
- 23 May – Round 11: Lance Hohaia played in his 150th game for the club and his 150th NRL match.
- 6 June – Round 13: Manu Vatuvei played in his 100th match for the club.
- 17 July – Round 19: Ben Matulino played in his 50th match for the club.
- 21 August – Round 24: Alehana Mara made his debut for the club and his debut in the NRL.
- 27 August – Round 25: Sam Rapira played in his 100th match for the club.
- 10 September – Qualifying Final: Manu Vatuvei became the club's all-time leading try scorer, surpassing Stacey Jones' total of 77.
- 10 September – Qualifying Final: Russell Packer played in his 50th match for the club.
- 4 October – Grand Final: The club was presented with the Club Championship and the Junior Warriors won the Toyota Cup.

== Jersey and sponsors ==

In 2010 the Warriors jerseys were again made by Canterbury of New Zealand. They retained their black and white home and away jerseys from 2009, however they added a 15-year anniversary blue jersey and a grey Heritage design, similar to the jersey worn for the Awen Guttenbeil testimonial match. The club also had a new white and black training jersey.

The Warriors wore their blue strip in the first round of the season after the Gold Coast Titans opted to wear their white away jerseys for the match in the Gold Coast. This decision was repeated in round three after Brisbane opted to wear white in another Sunday afternoon game in Queensland.

Vodafone New Zealand was again the naming rights sponsor of the Warriors in 2009. Lion Red was the sleeve sponsor. Suzuki and HiFX were featured on the shorts while Loadlift was on the back of the jersey.

== Fixtures ==
The Warriors again use Mt Smart Stadium as their home ground in 2010, their only home ground since they entered the competition in 1995.

=== Pre-season training ===
The main squad returned to training on 2 November 2009 to start preparing for the 2010 season. Players involved in the 2009 Four Nations and 2009 Pacific Cup returned to training later.

=== Pre-season matches ===
Date	Round	Opponent	Venue	Result	Score	Tries	Goals	Attendance	Report
13 February	Trial 1	Sydney Roosters	Rotorua International Stadium, Rotorua	Win	26–8	Heremaia (2), Locke, Ah Van, Ta'ai	Seymour (3)	9,600	
20 February	Trial 2	North Queensland Cowboys	Barlow Park, Cairns	Win	28–6	Hohaia (2), Heremaia, Ah Van, Tupou	Seymour, Locke, Heremaia, Johnson	10,000	
27 February	Trial 3	Manly-Warringah Sea Eagles	North Harbour Stadium, Auckland	Draw	16–16	Vatuvei, Moon, Latimore	Seymour, Johnson	17,362	

=== Regular season ===
Date	Round	Opponent	Venue	Result	Score	Tries	Goals	Attendance	Report
14 March	Round 1	Gold Coast Titans	Skilled Park, Gold Coast	Loss	18–24	Vatuvei (2), Locke	Seymour (3)	16,112	
20 March	Round 2	Cronulla Sharks	Mt Smart Stadium, Auckland	Win	30–16	Vatuvei (3), Heremaia, Mannering, Rapira	Locke (2), Maloney (1)	15,314	
28 March	Round 3	Brisbane Broncos	Suncorp Stadium, Brisbane	Win	48–16	Maloney (3), Ropati (2), Mannering, Hohaia, Moon	Maloney (8)	32,338	
4 April	Round 4	Manly-Warringah Sea Eagles	Mt Smart Stadium, Auckland	Loss	6–14	Ropati	Maloney (1)	19,230	
10 April	Round 5	Canterbury-Bankstown Bulldogs	ANZ Stadium, Sydney	Win	30–24	Tate, Vatuvei, Lillyman, Locke, Hohaia	Maloney (5)	17,095	
18 April	Round 6	Penrith Panthers	Mt Smart Stadium, Auckland	Loss	12–40	Ta'ai, Tate	Maloney (2)	14,620	
25 April	Round 7	Melbourne Storm	Etihad Stadium	Loss	6–40	Ta'ai	Maloney (1)	23,906	
1 May	Round 8	Canberra Raiders	Mt Smart Stadium, Auckland	Loss	16–23	Ta'ai, Ah Van, Tate	Maloney (2)	11,499	
	Round 9	Bye			–				
15 May	Round 10	North Queensland Cowboys	Mt Smart Stadium, Auckland	Win	24–12	Ta'ai, Brown, Henderson, Locke	Maloney (4)	10,800	
23 May	Round 11	South Sydney Rabbitohs	Mt Smart Stadium, Auckland	Win	26–24	Ropati (2), Hohaia, Tate, Packer	Seymour (3)	10,485	
28 May	Round 12	Wests Tigers	Campbelltown Stadium, Sydney	Loss	6–50	Moon	Seymour (1)	10,061	
6 June	Round 13	St George Illawarra Dragons	Mt Smart Stadium, Auckland	Loss	20–22	Maloney, Mannering, John	Maloney (4)	8,312	
13 June	Round 14	Newcastle Knights	EnergyAustralia Stadium, Newcastle	Win	32–24	Vatuvei (2), Moon, Latimore, Maloney	Maloney (6)	10,535	
	Round 15	Bye			–				
27 June	Round 16	Sydney Roosters	AMI Stadium, Christchurch	Win	20–18	Locke (3), Vatuvei	Maloney (2)	20,721	
4 July	Round 17	Parramatta Eels	Mt Smart Stadium, Auckland	Win	35–6	Brown (2), Matulino, Ta'ai, Vatuvei, Maloney	Maloney (5), John (FG)	9,912	
11 July	Round 18	Penrith Panthers	CUA Stadium, Sydney	Win	12–6	Maloney, Vatuvei	Maloney (2)	9,983	
17 July	Round 19	Melbourne Storm	Mt Smart Stadium, Auckland	Win	13–6	Vatuvei, Ropati	Maloney (1 & FG)	13,118	
25 July	Round 20	South Sydney Rabbitohs	ANZ Stadium, Sydney	Loss	28–38	Brown (2), Vatuvei, Latimore, Maloney	Maloney (4)	13,895	
1 August	Round 21	Gold Coast Titans	Mt Smart Stadium, Auckland	Loss	20–28	Mannering, Hohaia, Vatuvei, Seymour	Maloney (2)	12,017	
7 August	Round 22	Cronulla-Sutherland Sharks	Toyota Stadium, Sydney	Win	37–10	Tupou (3), Tate, Maloney, Moon	Maloney (6 & FG)	7,510	
15 August	Round 23	Newcastle Knights	Mt Smart Stadium, Auckland	Win	22–10	Vatuvei (3), Tupou	Maloney (3)	12,824	
21 August	Round 24	Manly-Warringah Sea Eagles	Brookvale Oval, Sydney	Loss	16–19	Maloney, Mannering	Maloney (4)	13,095	
27 August	Round 25	Brisbane Broncos	Mt Smart Stadium, Auckland	Win	36–4	Brown(2), Hohaia(2), Vatuvei, Mannering, Matulino	Maloney(4)	21,627	
4 September	Round 26	Parramatta Eels	Parramatta Stadium, Sydney	Win	26–12	Ropati, Tate, Royal, Locke, Vatuvei	Maloney (3)	11,383	

=== Finals ===
Qualifying finals
1	St. George Illawarra	28
8	Manly	0
2	Penrith	22
7	Canberra	24
3	Wests	15
6	Sydney	19
4	Gold Coast	28
5	New Zealand	16

Semifinals
4W	Canberra	24
2L	Wests	26
3W	Sydney	34
1L	Penrith	12

Preliminary finals
1W	St. George Illawarra	13
Wests	12
2W	Gold Coast	6
Sydney	32

Final
St. George Illawarra	32
Sydney	8

Date	Round	Opponent	Venue	Result	Score	Tries	Goals	Attendance	Report
10 September	Qualifying Final	Gold Coast Titans	Skilled Park, Gold Coast	Loss	16-28	Heremaia, Moon, Vatuvei	Maloney (2)	27,026	

== Ladder ==
2010 NRL season
Pos.	Team	Pld	W	D	L	B	PF	PA	PD	Pts
1	St. George Illawarra Dragons (P)	24	17	0	7	2	518	299	+219	38
2	Penrith Panthers	24	15	0	9	2	645	489	+156	34
3	Wests Tigers	24	15	0	9	2	537	503	+34	34
4	Gold Coast Titans	24	15	0	9	2	520	498	+22	34
5	New Zealand Warriors	24	14	0	10	2	539	486	+53	32
6	Sydney Roosters	24	14	0	10	2	559	510	+49	32
7	Canberra Raiders	24	13	0	11	2	499	493	+6	30
8	Manly Warringah Sea Eagles	24	12	0	12	2	545	510	+35	28
9	South Sydney Rabbitohs	24	11	0	13	2	584	567	+17	26
10	Brisbane Broncos	24	11	0	13	2	508	535	−27	26
11	Newcastle Knights	24	10	0	14	2	499	569	−70	24
12	Parramatta Eels	24	10	0	14	2	413	491	−78	24
13	Canterbury-Bankstown Bulldogs	24	9	0	15	2	494	539	−45	22
14	Cronulla-Sutherland Sharks	24	7	0	17	2	354	609	−255	18
15	North Queensland Cowboys	24	5	0	19	2	425	667	−242	14
16	Melbourne Storm	24	14	0	10	2	489	363	+126	0^{1}

^{1} Melbourne were deducted eight premiership points and barred from receiving premiership points for the rest of the season due to gross long-term salary cap breaches.

== Squad ==
Twenty nine players played for the Warriors during the season. Seven players made their debut for the club, including four making their NRL debuts.

No.	Name	Position	Warriors debut	App	T	G	FG	Pts
99	Lance Hohaia	UB	6 April 2002	23	6	0	0	24
108	Jerome Ropati	CE / FE	31 August 2003	19	7	0	0	28
115	Manu Vatuvei	WG	23 May 2004	19	20	0	0	80
121	Steve Price	PR	13 March 2005	0	0	0	0	0
125	Simon Mannering	CE	26 June 2005	18	6	0	0	24
126	Micheal Luck	SR	12 March 2006	20	0	0	0	0
129	Patrick Ah Van	WG	9 April 2006	1	1	0	0	4
131	Sam Rapira	PR	20 May 2006	16	1	0	0	4
132	Wade McKinnon	FB	17 March 2007	6	0	0	0	0
137	Brent Tate	CE	17 March 2008	21	6	0	0	24
138	Ian Henderson	HK	23 March 2008	17	1	0	0	4
141	Russell Packer	PR	4 May 2008	24	1	0	0	4
142	Ben Matulino	SR	14 June 2008	25	2	0	0	8
145	Joel Moon	CE / FE	14 March 2009	17	5	0	0	20
146	Jacob Lillyman	PR / SR	14 March 2009	12	1	0	0	4
148	Jesse Royal	PR	22 March 2009	21	1	0	0	4
149	Ukuma Ta'ai	SR	22 March 2009	20	5	0	0	20
151	Lewis Brown	HK / LK	3 May 2009	23	7	0	0	28
152	Kevin Locke	FB / WG	31 May 2009	17	7	2	0	32
153	Aaron Heremaia	HB / HK	31 May 2009	25	2	0	0	8
154	Isaac John	FE / HB	19 July 2009	5	1	0	1	5
155	Siuatonga Likiliki	CE	15 August 2009	0	0	0	0	0
157	Brett Seymour	FE / HB	14 March 2010	13	1	8	0	18
156	James Maloney	HB	14 March 2010	24	10	73	2	188
158	Jeremy Latimore	PR	14 March 2010	16	2	0	0	8
159	Sione Lousi	SR	14 March 2010	7	0	0	0	0
160	Bill Tupou	WG	4 April 2010	12	4	0	0	16
161	Mataupu Poching	PR	15 May 2010	1	0	0	0	0
162	Alehana Mara	HK	21 August 2010	3	0	0	0	0
-	Elijah Taylor	FE	Uncapped	0	0	0	0	0

== Staff ==
- Chief executive officer: Wayne Scurrah
- Football operations manager: Don Mann Jr
- Recruitment and development manager: Dean Bell
- High performance manager: Craig Walker
- High performance assistant: Ruben Wiki
- Medical services manager: Jude Spiers
- Welfare and education manager: Jerry Seuseu

=== NRL staff ===
- NRL head coach: Ivan Cleary
- NRL assistant coach: Tony Iro
- NRL technical assistant: David Fairleigh
- NRL assistant trainer: Dayne Norton
- Club doctor: John Mayhew
- Kicking coach: Daryl Halligan

=== NYC staff ===
- NYC head coach & assistant NRL coach: John Ackland
- NYC assistant coach: Frank Harold
- NYC manager: Jerry Seuseu

== Transfers ==
=== Gains ===
Player	Previous club	Length	Notes
Brett Seymour	Cronulla Sharks	2010, with option	
James Maloney	Melbourne Storm	2011, with option	
Jeremy Latimore	Parramatta Eels	2010, with option	

=== Losses ===
Player	Club	Notes
Stacey Jones	Retired	
Evarn Tuimavave	Newcastle Knights	
Denan Kemp	Brisbane Broncos	
Leeson Ah Mau	North Queensland Cowboys	
Aidan Kirk	Released	
Malo Solomona	Released	
Daniel O'Regan	Melbourne Storm	

=== Mid-season losses ===
Player	Club	Notes
Wade McKinnon	Wests Tigers	

=== Contract extensions ===
- Micheal Luck – until end of 2012.

== Other teams ==
In 2010 the Junior Warriors again competed in the Toyota Cup while senior players who were not required for the first team play with the Auckland Vulcans in the NSW Cup. The Vulcans finished ninth out of twelve teams and missed the finals by just one point. Brent Gemmell was the coach of the Vulcans. Pita Godinet was the Vulcans player of the year while Johnny Aranga won the Rookie of the year award.

=== 2010 Junior Warriors ===
National Youth Competition season 2010
	Team	Pld	W	D	L	B	PF	PA	PD	Pts
1	South Sydney Rabbitohs	24	17	0	7	2	687	567	+120	38
2	New Zealand Warriors (P)	24	16	1	7	2	731	481	+250	37
3	Canterbury-Bankstown Bulldogs	24	15	2	7	2	773	596	+177	36
4	North Queensland Cowboys	24	14	3	7	2	673	540	+133	35
5	Sydney Roosters	24	14	1	9	2	695	588	+107	33
6	Canberra Raiders	24	14	1	9	2	764	734	+30	33
7	Manly Warringah Sea Eagles	24	13	0	11	2	568	583	-15	30
8	Gold Coast Titans	24	12	1	11	2	581	663	-82	29
9	Wests Tigers	24	12	0	12	2	620	532	+88	28
10	Brisbane Broncos	24	11	1	12	2	690	635	+55	27
11	St. George Illawarra Dragons	24	10	1	13	2	568	543	+25	25
12	Newcastle Knights	24	9	1	14	2	612	732	-120	23
13	Melbourne Storm	24	8	2	14	2	683	782	-99	22
14	Cronulla-Sutherland Sharks	24	8	1	15	2	492	634	-142	21
15	Penrith Panthers	24	8	0	16	2	643	838	-195	20
16	Parramatta Eels	24	3	1	20	2	454	786	-332	11

Qualifying finals
1	South Sydney	24
8	Gold Coast	22
2	New Zealand	25
7	Manly Warringah	22
3	Canterbury	54
6	Canberra	18
4	North Queensland	46
5	Sydney	12

Semifinals
4W	North Queensland	18
2L	Canberra	22
3W	Canterbury	24
1L	Sydney	22

Preliminary finals
1W	South Sydney	64
Canberra	18
2W	New Zealand	23
Canterbury	16

Final
South Sydney	28
New Zealand	42

==== Grand Final ====
The match was the club's sixth grand final appearance in sixteen seasons after the 2002 NRL, 1996 and 1997 Reserve Grade, 1997 Under 19's and 1995 Lion Red Cup grand finals. The club led 12–10 at halftime before going on to win 42–28.

Under-20s: Glen Fisiiahi, Omar Slaimankhel, Sosaia Feki, Siuatonga Likiliki, Elijah Niko, Carlos Tuimavave, Shaun Johnson, Neccrom Areaiiti, Henry Chan-Ting, Mark Ioane, Matt Robinson, Elijah Taylor (C), Sebastine Ikahihifo. Bench: Nafe Seluini, Charlie Gubb, Sam Lousi, Daniel Palavi. Coach: John Ackland.

Captain Ben Henry withdrew before the match started due to injury while John Palavi was omitted from the bench. Carlos Tuimavave won the man of the match award.

Date	Round	Opponent	Venue	Result	Score	Tries	Goals	Attendance	Report
4 October	Grand Final	South Sydney Rabbitohs	ANZ Stadium, Sydney	Win	42-28	Taylor (2), Likiliki, Fisiiahi, Lousi, Niko, Seluini	Johnson (7)	82,334	

== Awards ==
Manu Vatuvei was named the Lion Red Player of the Year and the Vodafone One Tribe Player of the Year at the club's annual awards function. James Maloney was the Vodafone Young Player of the Year while Aaron Heremaia was named the Canterbury of New Zealand Clubperson of the Year.

Micheal Luck, Vatuvei and Sam Rapira were all presented with rings to celebrate them playing there 100th match for the club during the season.
