= Mataupu Poching =

NZ rugby league footballer

Upu Poching
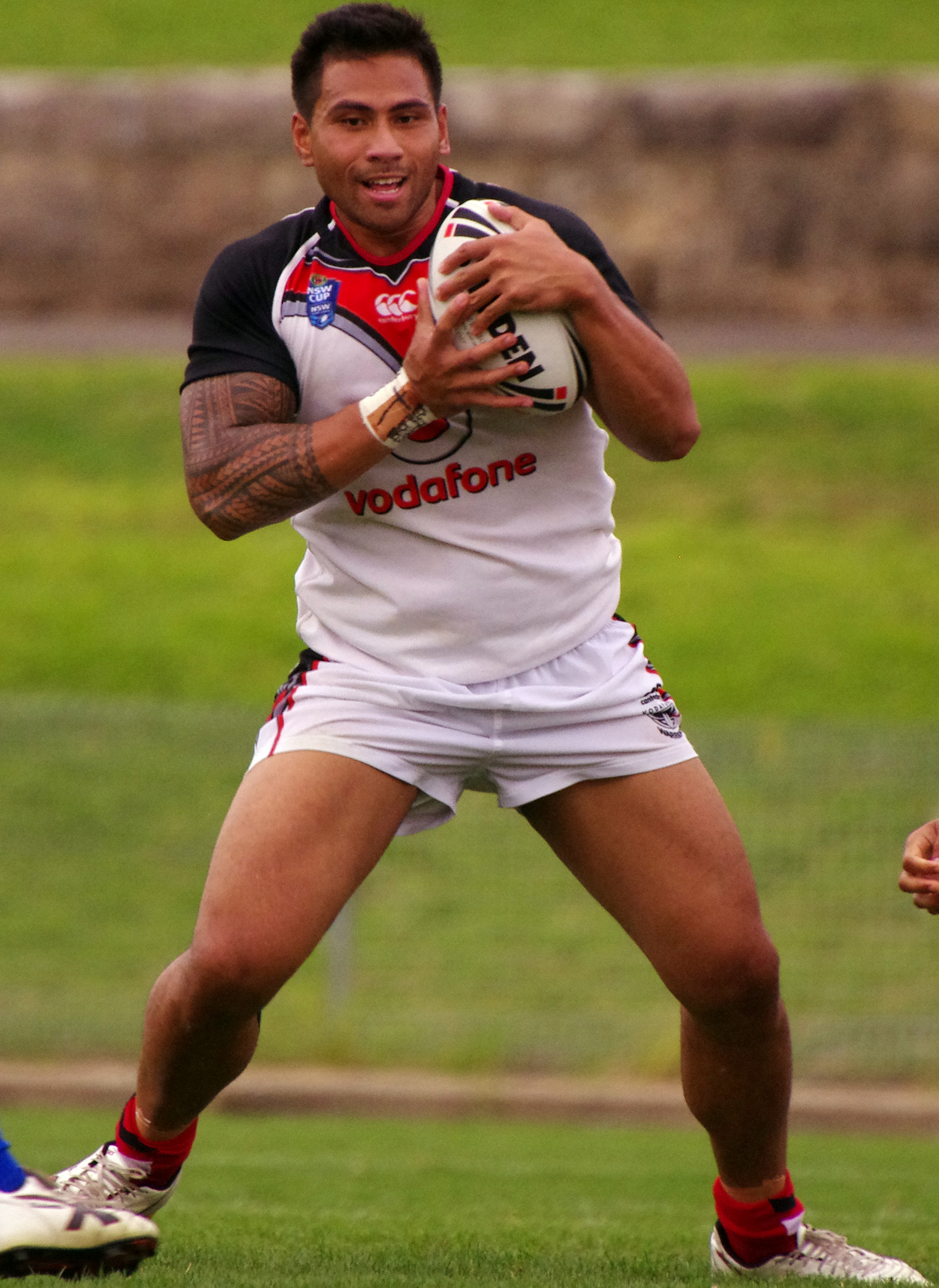

Personal information
- Full name: Mataupu Poching
- Born: 7 February 1988 (age 37); Auckland, New Zealand
- Height: 187 cm (6 ft 2 in)
- Weight: 106 kg (16 st 10 lb)

Playing information
- Position: Prop
Club
| Years | Team | Pld | T | G | FG | P |
|---|---|---|---|---|---|---|
| 2010 | New Zealand Warriors | 1 | 0 | 0 | 0 | 0 |
| 2012 | AS Carcassonne | | 0 | 0 | 0 | 0 |
| | Total | 1 | 0 | 0 | 0 | 0 |
- Source: As of 14 Sep 2022

Mataupu Poching (born 7 February 1988 in Auckland, New Zealand) is a professional rugby league footballer who currently plays for in NSW Cup. He has previously played in the National Rugby League for the New Zealand Warriors and the AS Carcassonne in the French Elite One Championship.

== Early years ==
Poching attended Aorere College and played for the Mangere East Hawks in the Auckland Rugby League competition. He also played for the Counties Manukau Jetz in the Bartercard Cup.

== Warriors ==
As a 19-year-old he played in the NSWRL Premier League for the Auckland Lions in twenty matches before joining the Junior Warriors in 2008 with the creation of the Toyota Cup. He played in 24 of the team's 27 games and scored one try. This led to him being resigned for the 2009 and 2010 seasons.

He joined the New Zealand Warriors senior side in 2009 but his season was hampered with injury. He made his first grade debut on 15 May 2010, against the North Queensland Cowboys.

In 2011 he was named the Auckland Vulcans Player of the Year. He played in the French Elite One Championship for AS Carcassonne in 2012.

He played for the Counties Manukau Stingrays in the 2013 and 2015 National Competitions and in 2014 played in the NSW Cup for the New Zealand Warriors.

== Representative career ==
Poching was a Junior Kiwi in 2006 and played for the NZ Under-18s in 2007.
