= Aaron Heremaia =

Former New Zealand and Maori international rugby league footballer

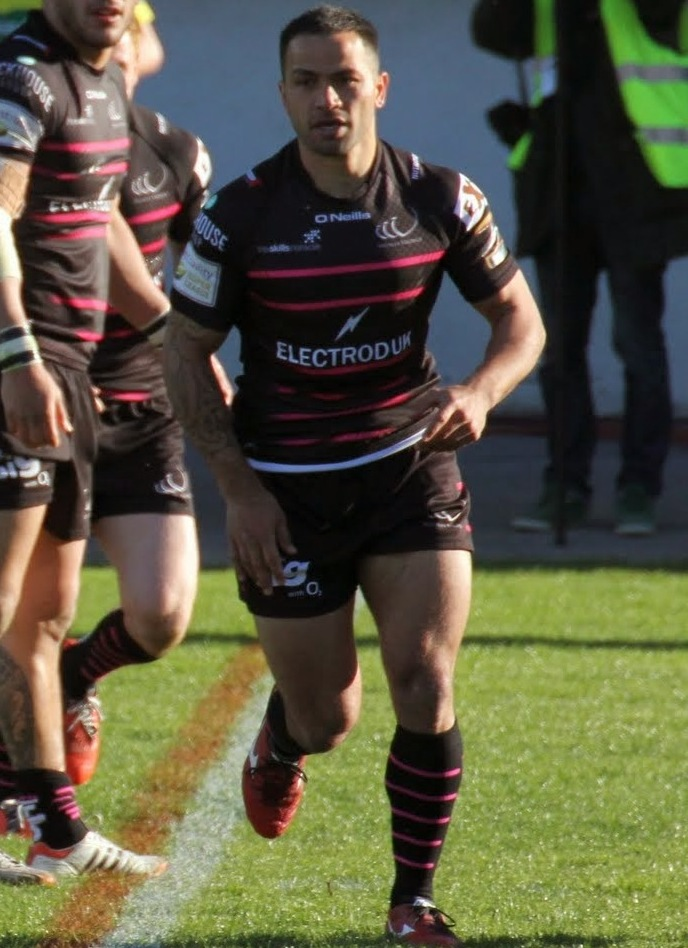

Personal information
- Full name: Aaron Aspin Heremaia
- Born: 19 September 1982 (age 44) Auckland, New Zealand

Playing information
- Height: 175 cm (5 ft 9 in)
- Weight: 88 kg (13 st 12 lb)
- Position: Hooker, Halfback, Five-eighth
Club
Years	Team	Pld	T	G	FG	P
2006–07	Leigh Centurions	54	31	26	3	179
2009–11	New Zealand Warriors	60	5	0	0	20
2012–14	Hull F.C.	70	13	10	0	72
2015–18	Widnes Vikings	103	9	0	0	36
	Total	287	58	36	3	307
Representative
Years	Team	Pld	T	G	FG	P
2002–10	New Zealand Māori	6	0	8	0	16
2010	New Zealand	1	0	0	0	0

Aaron Aspin Heremaia (born 19 September 1982) is a New Zealand former professional rugby league footballer who last played as a goal-kicking hooker or halfback for the Widnes Vikings in the Super League.

== Background ==
Heremaia was born in Auckland, New Zealand.

== Playing career ==
Educated at Tangaroa College and a Manurewa Marlins junior, Heremaia started his career in 2001 playing for the Hibiscus Coast Raiders in the Bartercard Cup whilst on a New Zealand Warriors development contract. where he played under successful coaches Tony Benson and Brian McClennan. Heremaia however failed to be picked up by the Warriors. In 2004 Heremaia moved to Australia to play in the NSWRL Premier League, where he represented the Western Suburbs Magpies and North Sydney Bears in successive years.

In 2006 he moved to England to play for the Leigh Centurions in the National League One, again linking up with Tony Benson. That year Heremaia was part of the team that won the Northern Rail Cup. He has also conditionally signed but never played for the Widnes Vikings in 2007 and Halifax in 2008.

Returning to New Zealand and the Manurewa Marlins, Heremaia was able to make the Auckland Vulcans team for 2008, playing in the NSW Cup. From here he was able to impress the New Zealand Warriors and was signed to a contract for the 2009 season. He made his first grade début in Round Twelve against the Wests Tigers. He was re-signed by the Warriors until the end of the 2011 season. Heremaia joined Hull F.C. in 2012 on a two-year deal with an option for a third.

On 8 May 2014, Hull F.C. announced that they would release Heremaia at the end of the 2014 season.

One day after Hull announced Aaron would leave at the end of the season, the Widnes Vikings announced he will arrive at the club at the end of the 2014 season to play in 2015.

== Representative career ==
Heremaia played for the Junior Kiwis in 2001. He made his début for the New Zealand Māori side in 2002. He regularly appeared for the side while based in New Zealand and captained New Zealand Māori on several occasions.

For the 2010 Anzac Test, Heremaia was selected to play for New Zealand from the interchange bench in their loss against Australia.
