= Hikule'o Malu =

Cook Islands international rugby league footballer

Personal information
- Born: 5 April 1993 (age 32); Auckland, New Zealand
- Height: 175 cm (5 ft 9 in)
- Weight: 84 kg (13 st 3 lb)

Playing information
- Position: Halfback, Hooker
Representative
Years	Team	Pld	T	G	FG	P
2013	Cook Islands	1	0	0	0	0

Hikule'o Malu (Eko Malu) is a New Zealand rugby league player who represented the Cook Islands national rugby league team in the 2013 World Cup.

== Playing career ==
A Mangere East Hawks junior, Malu was educated at Aorere College.

He was signed by the New Zealand Warriors and made his National Youth Competition debut in 2011. He played in the 2011 and 2013 grand finals.

He was named in the Cook Islands squad for the 2013 World Cup.

In 2014 he played for the Howick Hornets in the Auckland Rugby League competition. He played for the Akarana Falcons in the 2015 National Competition.
