= Konrad Hurrell =

Tonga international rugby league footballer

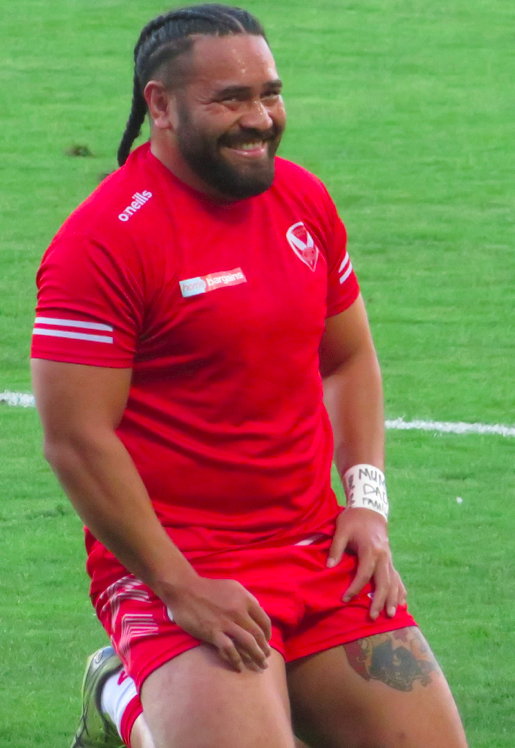

Personal information
- Full name: Konileti Hurrell
- Born: 5 August 1991 (age 35) Tofoa, Tonga

Playing information
- Height: 6 ft 0 in (1.83 m)
- Weight: 17 st 5 lb (110 kg)
- Position: Centre
Club
| Years | Team | Pld | T | G | FG | P |
|---|---|---|---|---|---|---|
| 2012–16 | New Zealand Warriors | 71 | 41 | 0 | 0 | 164 |
| 2016–18 | Gold Coast Titans | 45 | 14 | 0 | 0 | 56 |
| 2019–21 | Leeds Rhinos | 55 | 23 | 0 | 0 | 92 |
| 2022–25 | St Helens | 64 | 26 | 0 | 0 | 104 |
| 2025(DR) | → Halifax Panthers | 4 | 0 | 0 | 0 | 0 |
| 2025(DR) | → Swinton Lions | 1 | 0 | 0 | 0 | 0 |
| 2025(loan) | → Bradford Bulls | 3 | 0 | 0 | 0 | 0 |
| 2025–26 | Lézignan Sangliers | 14 | 8 | 0 | 0 | 32 |
| | Total | 257 | 112 | 0 | 0 | 448 |
Representative
| Years | Team | Pld | T | G | FG | P |
| 2013–23 | Tonga | 13 | 2 | 0 | 0 | 8 |
| 2016 | World All Stars | 1 | 1 | 0 | 0 | 4 |

Konileti "Konrad" Hurrell, born on August 5, 1991, in Tongatapu (Tonga), is a former Tongan international rugby league footballer. A powerful centre renowned for his destructive runs and ability to break the defensive line, he began his professional career in the National Rugby League with the New Zealand Warriors in 2012, where he quickly established himself as one of the most impactful three-quarters in the Australian competition. After a notable spell with the Gold Coast Titans, he moved to Super League in 2019 with the Leeds Rhinos, and later St Helens, with whom he won several major titles, including the Challenge Cup (2020), the Super League (2022) and the World Club Challenge (2023). His performances earned him two selections in the Super League Dream Team, in 2019 and 2020.

A regular feature of the Tongan national side, he played in three editions of the Rugby League World Cup (2013, 2017 and 2022). As a starting centre during the 2017 campaign, he was part of his country’s historic run to the semi-finals, narrowly lost against England. Two years later, he was also in the squad that achieved a landmark victory by defeating Australia (16–12) in the 2019 Oceania Cup, a result regarded as a milestone in international rugby league.

In 2025, he featured in only one Challenge Cup match for St Helens without making an appearance in Super League, before going on to play for Halifax Panthers, Swinton Lions and Bradford Bulls. In September of the same year, he announced his move to the French Championship with F.C. Lézignan.

== Early life ==
Hurrell was born in Tofoa, Tonga, and moved to New Zealand in late 2009 on a rugby union scholarship with Auckland Grammar School.

He played for their first XV, earning vice captain in his second year, and represented Auckland Secondary Schools as a centre and second five-eighth. Hurrell was also a member of the athletics team and was New Zealand's national champion in weightlifting for the open weight category in 2010. Hurrell switched to rugby league in 2011. In 2011, he played for the Junior Warriors in the Toyota Cup. In this, his first year of playing rugby league, he scored 22 tries in 21 games and was named in the competition's Team of the Year. At the end of 2011, Hurrell was selected for the Junior Kiwis but was ineligible due to not having New Zealand Residency.

== Playing career ==
=== 2012 ===
In 2012, Hurrell was promoted into the New Zealand Warriors first grade squad by new coach Brian McClennan and played in all three trial matches. In February he signed a contract extension until the end of the 2013 season. Hurrell made his NRL debut for the New Zealand Warriors in round 1 against the Manly-Warringah Sea Eagles, impressing off the bench in the Warriors 26–20 loss at Eden Park. In round 2, Hurrell scored his first NRL career try in the 36–20 victory over the Parramatta Eels at Parramatta Stadium. In round 18 in the 32–14 victory over the Gold Coast Titans at Cbus Super Stadium, Hurrell scored his first hat-trick in the NRL, which made it twelve tries from twelve games at that stage of the season. On 15 July, he re-signed with the New Zealand Warriors until the end of 2015. On the day before the Warriors Round 24 game, Hurrell was dropped from the first grade team to the Auckland Vulcans NSW Cup team, following a poor defensive display in the Warriors embarrassing 12–52 loss against the North Queensland Cowboys at 1300SMILES Stadium. Hurrell, along with Shaun Johnson and Manu Vatuvei, finished the Warriors season as joint top try-scorer with 12 tries from 17 matches.

=== 2013 ===
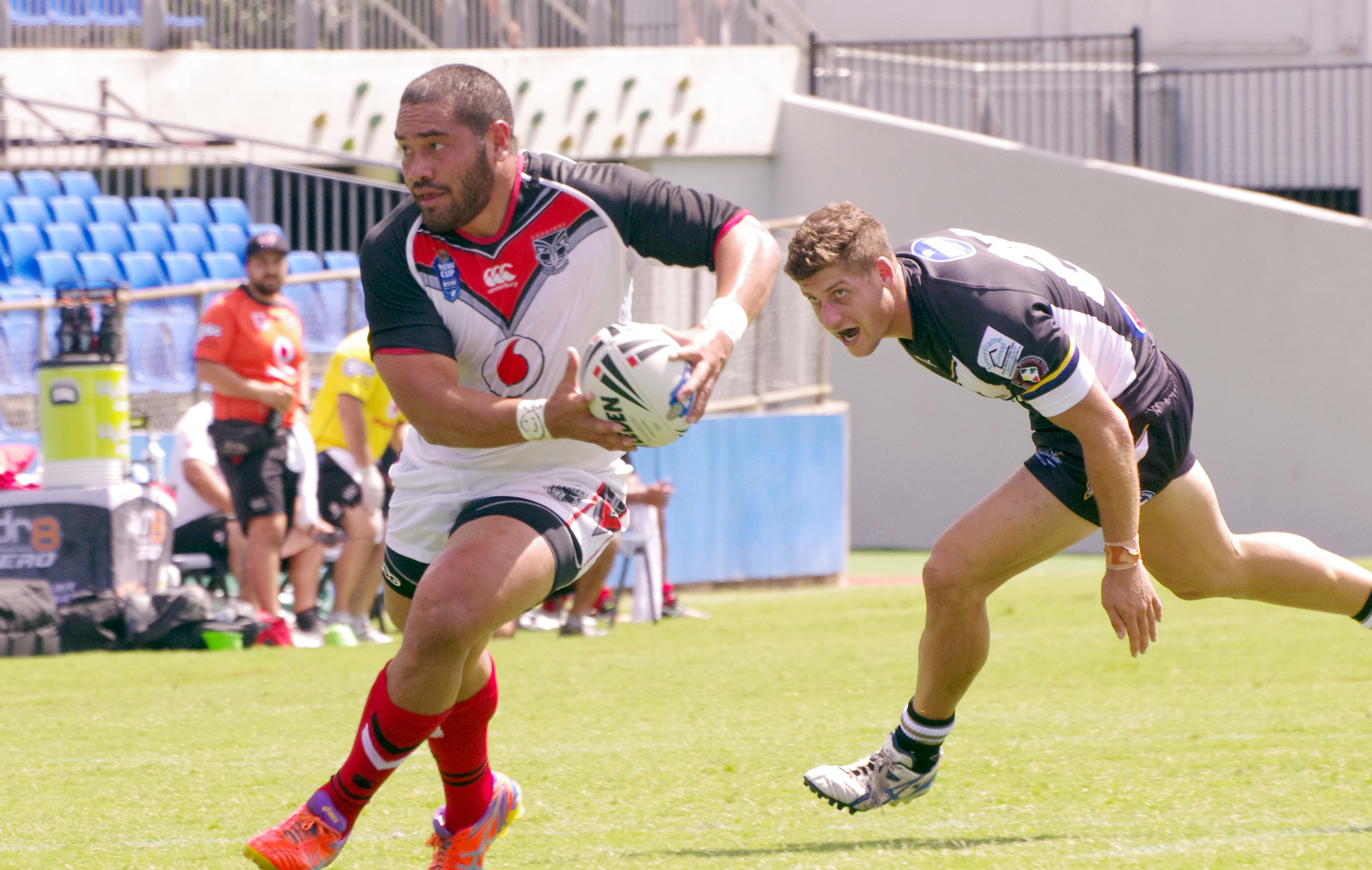
Hurrell playing for the Warriors in 2014

Hurrell finished the New Zealand Warriors season with 20 matches and 13 tries. In 2012, the Tonga-born Hurrell had signed a letter of intent with the New Zealand Rugby League, stating that he wanted to represent the New Zealand national rugby league team after qualifying on a residency basis. Despite this, he was named in the Tongan World Cup squad, playing in three matches and scoring a try against the Cook Islands in Tonga's 22–16 win.

=== 2014 ===
In February, Hurrell played in the New Zealand Warriors inaugural 2014 Auckland Nines. He was overlooked for Round 1 and 2 matches, instead playing in the NSW Cup, before returning for the round 3 match against the North Queensland Cowboys, scoring a try off the interchange bench. On 8 May 2014, Hurrell was fined $5,000 over a social media sex tape involving Shortland Street actress Teuila Blakely. Hurrell was later allowed to play the round 9 match against the Canberra Raiders at Eden Park, scoring a try in the New Zealand Warriors 54–12 win. Hurrell finished off the Warriors 2014 NRL season with him playing in 19 matches and scoring 12 tries. On 9 September, Hurrell was selected for the New Zealand national rugby league team Four Nations train-on squad, but didn't make the final 24-man squad.

=== 2015 ===
On 18 March, Hurrell re-signed with the New Zealand Warriors to the end of the 2018 season. On 2 May 2015, Hurrell played for Tonga in the 2015 Polynesian Cup against Samoa, playing at centre in their 18–16 loss at Cbus Super Stadium. In round 9 against the Cronulla-Sutherland Sharks, Hurrell was placed on report after he kneed Sharks forward Anthony Tupou in the face while taking a hit-up, leaving Tupou with a quadruple fracture of his jaw in the clubs 20–16 win at Remondis Stadium. Tupou later had surgery that required four metal plates, screws and wiring. Hurrell was charged with a grade three dangerous contact, taking an early plea and was suspended for three matches. Hurrell later returned in Round 14 against the Sydney Roosters in the Warriors 25–21 loss at Mt Smart Stadium. Hurrell finished the 2015 NRL season with him playing in 12 matches and scoring four tries for the New Zealand Warriors.

=== 2016 ===
On 29 January, Hurrell was named in the Warriors 2016 Auckland Nines squad. On 13 February, he played for the World All Stars against the Indigenous All Stars in the 2016 All Stars match, playing off the interchange bench and scoring a try in the World All Stars' 12–8 win at Suncorp Stadium.

On 25 May, the New Zealand Warriors announced that they had released him from the remainder of his contract effective immediately. The next day, he signed a contract with the Gold Coast Titans for the rest of the season and 2017.

=== 2017 ===
After making a significant impact to the Gold Coast Titans on his arrival mid 2016, Hurrell signed a contract extension until the end of 2019. Hurrell finished the regular season at the club winning the Members Most Valuable Player (MVP) as well as the Preston Award for his ongoing work within the community.

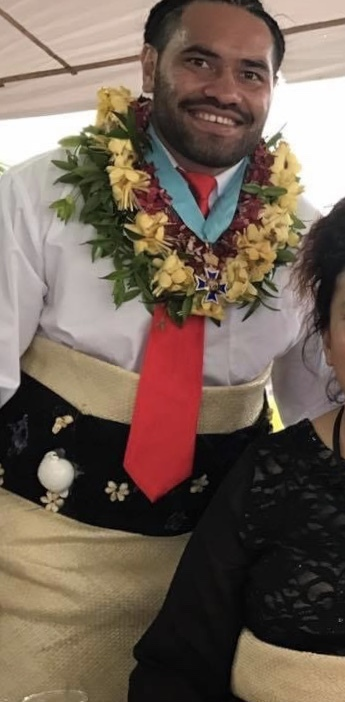
Hurrell representing Tonga in 2017

Hurrell then competed in the 2017 World Cup representing his home country, Tonga.

=== 2018 ===
Hurrell began the season with scoring the game winning try against Canberra at Cbus Stadium on the Gold Coast. Hurrell played his 100th NRL game in a loss against the St. George in Toowoomba, Queensland. Hurrell was selected to play for Tonga in the Pacific Test in July versing Samoa, resulting in a win and try for the centre. After a dip in form in the beginning of 2018, Hurrell played several games for the Tweed Heads Seagulls where he regained form and played out the rest of the season with the Gold Coast Titans.

On the 12 October, it was announced that Hurrell requested a release from the final year in his contract with the Gold Coast outfit, to sign as a Marquee Player for Leeds in the English Super League for the next three years.

=== 2019 ===
Hurrell had a stellar first year in the English Super League, becoming a crowd favourite and scoring a total of 14 tries in the season which made him the second highest try scorer for the year at the club. In April, while versing Hull Kingston Rovers, Hurrell scored four tries which surpassed his personal record of three tries in a single game. Hurrell won the Fans Player of the Year Award at the Presentation Night for the Leeds Rhinos on 9 October 2019.

=== 2020 ===
On 17 October 2020, he played in the 2020 Challenge Cup Final victory for Leeds over Salford at Wembley Stadium.

=== 2021 ===
Hurrell played a total of 17 games for Leeds in the 2021 Super League season including the club's 36–8 loss against St Helens in the semi-final. Following the conclusion of Super League XXVI, St Helens announced the signing of Hurrell on a one-year deal.

=== 2022 ===
In round 1 of the 2022 Super League season, Hurrell made his club debut for St Helens R.F.C. where they defeated Catalans Dragons 28-8. In June, Hurrell signed a one-year contract extension to remain at St Helens until the end of 2023. In round 16, Hurrell scored two tries in a 42-12 victory over his former club Leeds. In round 23, Hurrell scored two tries in a 60-6 victory over Hull F.C. In the Grand Final against Leeds on 24 September 2022, Hurrell scored a try in the 24 -12 win which saw Saints win their fourth Grand Final win in a row.

=== 2023 ===
On 18 February, Hurrell played in St Helens 13-12 upset victory over Penrith in the 2023 World Club Challenge. In round 3 of the 2023 Super League season, Hurrell was sent off in the final seconds of the match against Leeds after a tackle on Richie Myler. Leeds would then kick a drop goal right on the full-time siren to win 25-24. In round 7, Hurrell scored two tries in St Helens 38-0 victory over Wakefield Trinity.

=== 2024 ===
In round 6 of the 2024 Super League season, Hurrell scored the winning try for St Helens in their 12-4 victory over arch-rivals Wigan. Hurrell was limited to only 13 matches for St Helens in the 2024 Super League season which saw the club finish sixth on the table. On 19 November, it was announced that Hurrell had re-signed with the club on a one year deal.

=== 2025 ===
In February, Hurrell was sent out on dual-registration loan to Championship side Halifax with St Helens head coach Paul Wellens preferring Harry Robertson in the centre position.

On 30 May, it was reported that he had signed for Swinton in the RFL League 1 on loan.

On 9 June 2025, it was reported that he had signed for Bradford in the RFL Championship on two-week loan.

On 29 August 2025, Hurrell was officially deregistered by St Helens and it was announced he would depart the club at the end of the 2025 Super League season.

On 16 September 2025 it was reported that he had signed for FC Lézignan XIII in the Super XIII

=== 2026 ===
On 11 May 2026, Hurrell announced his retirement from rugby league after 14 years as professional rugby league player.

== Statistics ==
| Year | Team | Games | Tries | Pts |
|---|---|---|---|---|
| 2012 | New Zealand Warriors | 17 | 12 | 48 |
| 2013 | New Zealand Warriors | 20 | 13 | 52 |
| 2014 | New Zealand Warriors | 19 | 12 | 48 |
| 2015 | New Zealand Warriors | 12 | 4 | 16 |
| 2016 | New Zealand Warriors | 3 | | |
| 2016 | Gold Coast Titans | 10 | 3 | 12 |
| 2017 | Gold Coast Titans | 16 | 9 | 36 |
| 2018 | Gold Coast Titans | 19 | 2 | 8 |
| 2019 | Leeds Rhinos | 25 | 14 | 56 |
| 2020 | Leeds Rhinos | 13 | 7 | 32 |
| 2021 | Leeds Rhinos | 17 | 2 | 8 |
| 2022 | St Helens | 27 | 11 | 48 |
| 2023 | St Helens | 21 | 8 | 32 |
| 2024 | St Helens | 15 | 7 | 28 |
| 2025 | St Helens | 1 | | |
| 2025 | Halifax Panthers (loan) | 4 | | |
| 2025 | Swinton Lions (loan) | 1 | 0 | 0 |
| 2025 | Bradford Bulls (loan) | 3 | | |
| | Totals | 243 | 102 | 408 |
