= Ben Matulino =

New Zealand international rugby league footballer

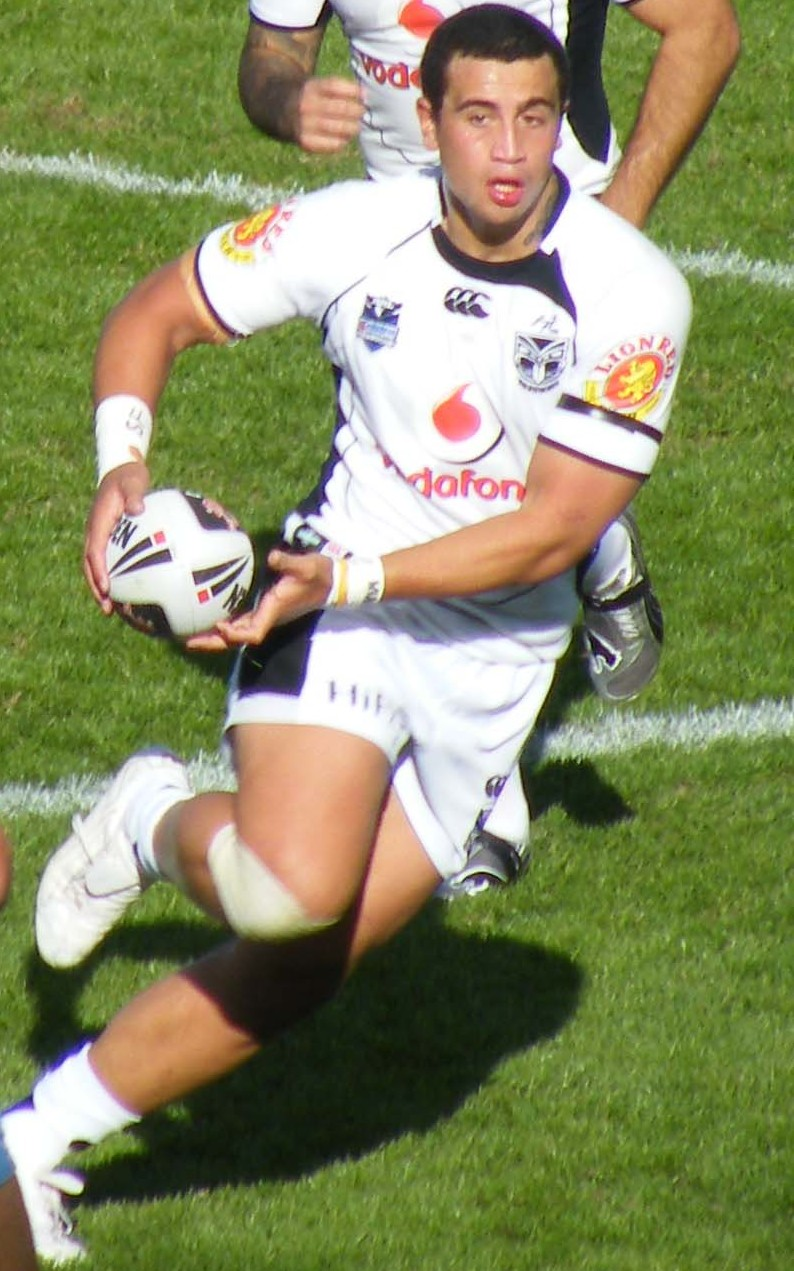

Personal information
- Full name: Ben Andrew Matulino
- Born: 3 January 1989 (age 37) Wellington, New Zealand
- Height: 193 cm (6 ft 4 in)
- Weight: 107 kg (16 st 12 lb)

Playing information
- Position: Prop, Second-row
Club
Years	Team	Pld	T	G	FG	P
2008–17	New Zealand Warriors	212	17	0	0	68
2018–19	Wests Tigers	36	1	0	0	4
	Total	248	18	0	0	72
Representative
Years	Team	Pld	T	G	FG	P
2009–15	New Zealand	23	1	0	0	4
- Source: As of 16 June 2019

Ben Andrew Matulino (born 3 January 1989) is a New Zealand former professional rugby league footballer who played in the 2000s and 2010s as a prop or second-row.

He played for the New Zealand Warriors and the Wests Tigers in the NRL, and New Zealand at international level.

Matulino is the first NRL player that graduated from the National Youth Competition to play 150 NRL career matches.

== Early years ==
Matulino was born in Wellington, New Zealand, and is of Samoan descent.

Growing up in Lower Hutt, he was educated at St Bernard's College, playing 1st XV rugby union for the college. Matulino decided to convert to rugby league due to lack of game time in union. He was named in the squad to attend the 2005 New Zealand under-16 high performance camp. Matulino won the College Sport Wellington Rugby League footballer of the year in 2006. Also that year he made the Junior Kiwis, and in 2007 he played for the New Zealand under 18s. Matulino played for Te Aroha Eels before making the Wellington Orcas squad for the Bartercard Cup.

== Playing career ==
=== 2008 ===
Matulino signed with the Newcastle Knights before changing his mind as he wished to stay in New Zealand, and was signed by the New Zealand Warriors soon after. He started the season playing for the Junior Warriors in the Toyota Cup. Matulino made his NRL debut in Round 14 against the Cronulla-Sutherland Sharks at Remondis Stadium off the interchange bench in the 24–8 loss. In Round 22 against the Brisbane Broncos, Matulino scored his first career try in the 16–12 win at Mt Smart Stadium. In August, he was named in both the Samoan and New Zealand training squads for the 2008 Rugby League World Cup but was not selected in either final 24-man squad. Matulino was named in the Toyota Cup Under 20 Team of the Year alongside teammate Russell Packer. He finished his Toyota Cup career with thirteen appearances and two tries. Matulino played in 15 matches and scored a try in his debut year in the NRL.

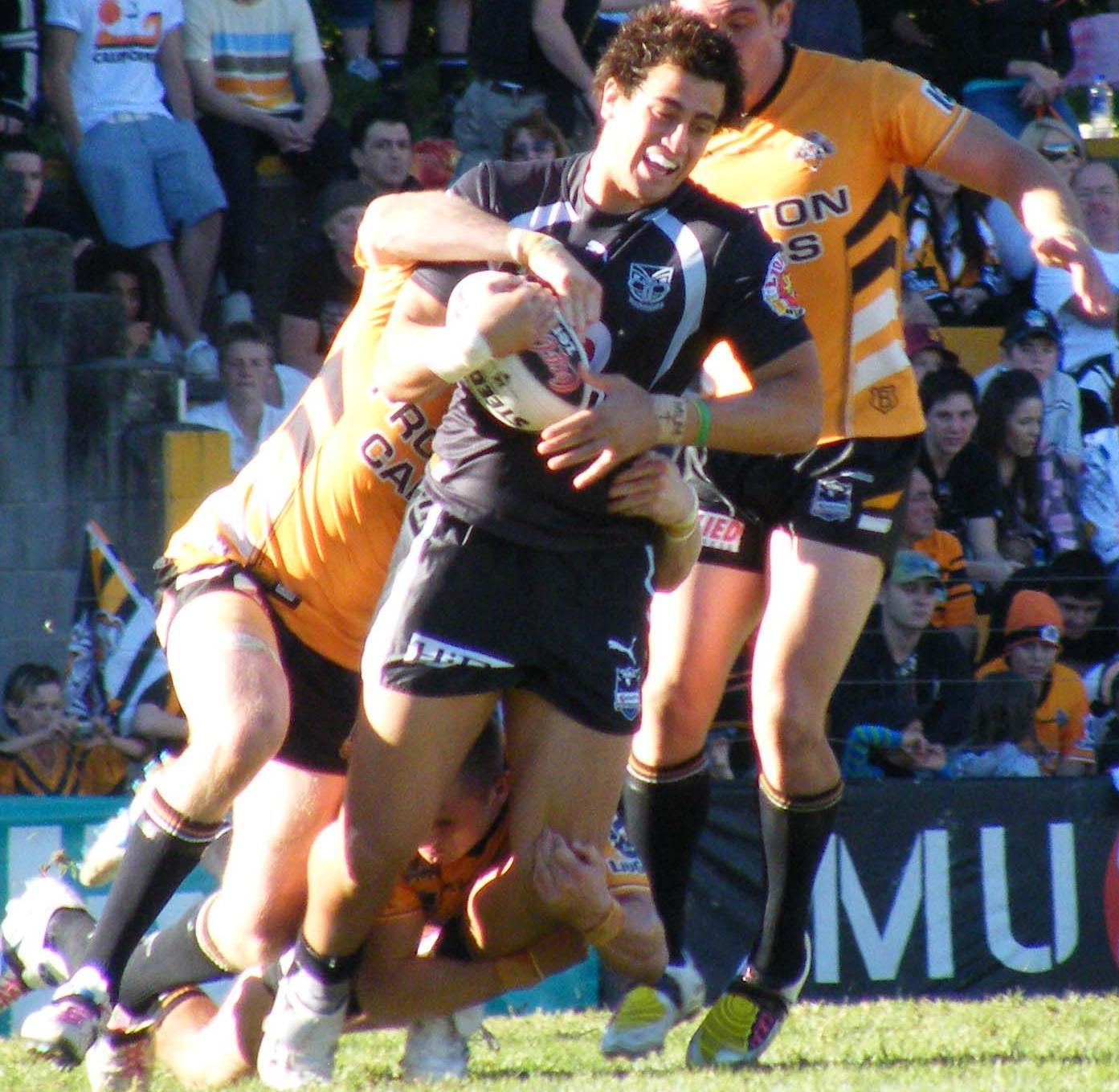
Matulino in 2009

=== 2009 ===
Matulino played 18 NRL matches in the 2009 NRL season. He was named in the New Zealand Kiwis Four Nations squad and made his debut in the 62–12 win over France on 1 November at Stade Ernest Wallon. Matulino scored his first international try in the loss to England at Alfred McAlpine Stadium. They were his only appearances for the series.

=== 2010 ===
For the 2010 Anzac Test, Matulino was selected to play from the interchange bench in the 12–8 loss against Australia. On 4 August, Matulino extended his contract with the Warriors until 2013. Matulino finished the 2010 NRL season with him playing in all the Warriors' 25 matches and scoring 2 tries. He was selected for the New Zealand squad for the 2010 Four Nations series, playing off the interchange bench in 16–12 win over Australia at Suncorp Stadium, making the Kiwis 2010 Four Nations champions.

=== 2011 ===
Matulino again played off the bench in the 2011 Anzac Test loss. He was selected to play for the Warriors on the interchange bench in the 2011 NRL Grand Final in which the Warriors were defeated 24–10 by the Manly-Warringah Sea Eagles. Matulino finished the 2011 NRL season having played in all of the Warriors' 28 matches and scoring 2 tries. In the post season, Matulino selected for the Kiwis squad for the 2011 Four Nations series, playing in 3 matches.

=== 2012 ===
For the 2012 Anzac Test, Matulino was selected to play for New Zealand at prop in the Kiwis' 20–12 loss against Australia at Eden Park. In Round 15 against the Sharks at Remondis Stadium, Matulino played his 100th NRL career match in the Warriors 20–19 loss. On 28 June 2012, Matulino extended his contract his with the Warriors to the end of the 2015 season. Matulino finished the 2012 NRL season with him being named the Warriors Player of the Year with him playing in 22 matches and scoring 3 tries. In October 2012, Matulino was selected to play for New Zealand in the one off October test at 1300SMILES Stadium off the interchange bench in the Kiwis' 18–10 loss.

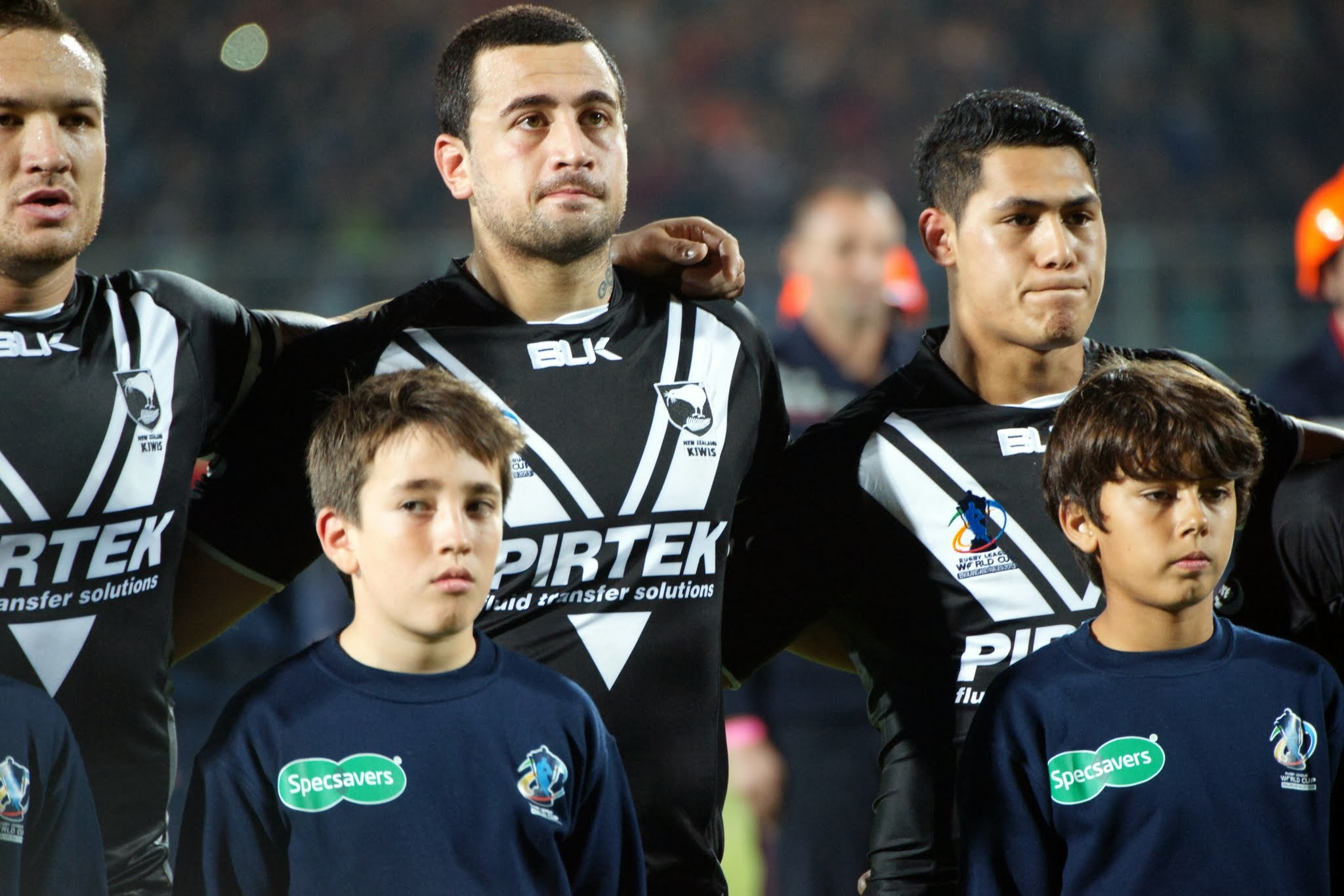
Ben Matulino in 2013

=== 2013 ===
For the 2013 Anzac Test, Matulino was selected to play for New Zealand from the interchange bench in the Kiwis' 32–12 loss against Australia at Canberra Stadium. Matulino finished the 2013 NRL season with him playing in all of the Warriors' 24 matches and scoring a try. In the post season, Matulino was included in the New Zealand 2013 Rugby League World Cup squad, playing in 5 matches, including playing off the interchange bench in the Kiwis' 34–2 loss to Australia in the World Cup final at Old Trafford.

=== 2014 ===
In Round 24 against the Sydney Roosters at Mt Smart Stadium, Matulino played his 150th match in the Warriors' 46–12 loss. Matulino is the first player who graduated from the NYC to play in 150 NRL matches. Matulino finished off the Warriors 2014 NRL season with him playing in 20 matches and scoring 4 tries. On 7 September, Matulino was selected for the New Zealand Kiwis 2014 Four Nations 24-man squad.

=== 2015 ===
On 16 January 2015, Matulino was named in the Warriors' 2015 Auckland Nines squad. On 5 February, Matulino re-signed with the New Zealand Warriors on a 2-year contract to the end of the 2017 season. Matulino was selected for New Zealand in the 2015 Anzac Test against Australia at Suncorp Stadium, which the Kiwis won 26–12. Matulino finished the 2015 NRL season with him playing in 21 matches and scoring 2 tries for the Warriors. On 8 September 2015, Matulino was named in the New Zealand Kiwis' training squad. On 15 September 2015, Matulino was named as the New Zealand Warriors' Player of the Year for the second time in four years. On 8 October, Matulino was selected in the 23-man New Zealand squad to tour England. Matulino played in all 3 matches against England in the Kiwis 2-1 Baskerville Shield series loss.

=== 2016 ===
On 29 January 2016, Matulino was selected in the Warriors' 2016 Auckland Nines squad. In April 2016, Matulino was one of six players to be dropped by coach Andrew McFadden after him alongside Manu Vatuvei, Bodene Thompson, Konrad Hurrell, Sam Lisone and Albert Vete after they allegedly mixed prescription pills with energy drinks on a night out in Auckland, a day after the Warriors heavy 42–0 loss to the Melbourne Storm at AAMI Park in Round 8. Matulino finished the 2016 NRL season with him playing in 23 matches and scoring 1 try for the Warriors.

=== 2017 ===
Matulino missed the first eight rounds of the season after suffering a knee injury at training during the Christmas break. On 25 April 2017, Matulino signed with the Wests Tigers from 2018 on a three-year deal, reuniting with coach Ivan Cleary. Matulino said, "He's the one that gave me my debut and brought me up to full-time training at the Warriors. I have a lot of respect for him and he's shown me a lot of faith. Just his approach to coaching stood out for me. You don't want to upset him in any way, so you want to play for him." Matulino finished his last year with the New Zealand Warriors with him playing in 16 matches and scoring 1 try in the 2017 NRL season.

=== 2018 ===
In Round 1, Matulino made his club debut for the Wests Tigers against the Sydney Roosters, playing off the interchange bench in the upset 10–8 win at ANZ Stadium.

=== 2019 ===
In the 2019 NRL season, Matulino made 13 appearances for the Wests Tigers as the club finished 9th on the table. On 31 October, Matulino announced his retirement from rugby league.

== Statistics ==
Year	Team	Games	Tries	Pts
2008	Warriors	15	1	4
2009	Warriors	18		
2010	Warriors	25	2	8
2011	Warriors	28	2	8
2012	Warriors	22	3	12
2013	Warriors	24	1	4
2014	Warriors	20	4	16
2015	Warriors	21	2	8
2016	Warriors	23	1	4
2017	Warriors	16	1	4
2018	Wests Tigers	23		
2019	Wests Tigers	13	1	4
	Totals	248	18	72
