= Bill Tupou =

Tonga international rugby league footballer (born 1990)

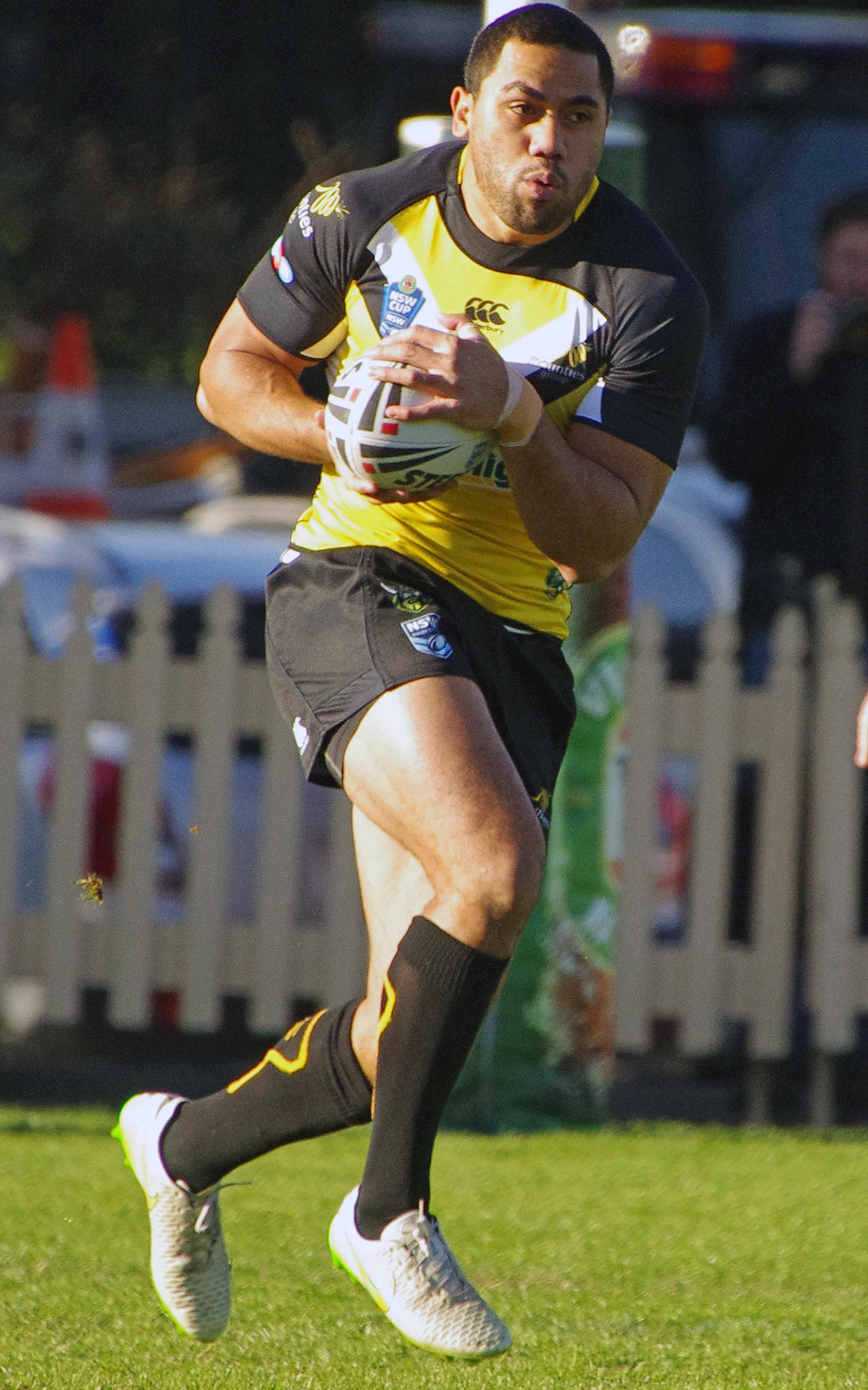

Personal information
- Full name: Pio Bill Tupou
- Born: 2 July 1990 (age 36) Auckland, New Zealand

Playing information
- Height: 6 ft 0 in (1.83 m)
- Weight: 15 st 8 lb (99 kg)
- Position: Centre, Wing
Club
Years	Team	Pld	T	G	FG	P
2010–13	New Zealand Warriors	64	31	0	0	124
2014–15	Canberra Raiders	14	3	0	0	12
2015–22	Wakefield Trinity	126	40	0	0	160
	Total	204	74	0	0	296
Representative
Years	Team	Pld	T	G	FG	P
2014	Tonga	1	1	0	0	4

Bill Tupou (born 2 July 1990) (Tongan: Pila Tupou) is a former Tonga international rugby league footballer who last played as a centre or on the wing for Wakefield Trinity in the Super League.

He previously played for the New Zealand Warriors and the Canberra Raiders in the National Rugby League (NRL).

== Background ==
Tupou was born in Auckland, New Zealand.

== Early years ==
Tupou attended Kelston Boys High School and played for the Bay Roskill Vikings and Marist Saints in the Auckland Rugby League competition.

Tupou represented the New Zealand Under-16 side and also represented Auckland Under-16 teams.

== Playing career ==
With the creation of the Toyota Cup in 2008 Tupou joined the New Zealand Warriors under-20 side and scored 14 tries in 19 games. He repeated this effort in 2009, scoring 14 tries in just 17 games.

Tupou was one of a small group of players still eligible for the side in 2010. In all, Tupou played 51 Toyota Cup games for the Junior Warriors, scoring thirty seven tries.

In 2010 he trained during the pre-season with the senior side and was named to make his first grade début for the Warriors on 4 April 2010 against the Manly-Warringah Sea Eagles.

In 2010 he was picked for the Junior Kiwis.

In the 2011 NRL season, Tupou played 17 games for the New Zealand Warriors as the club reached the 2011 NRL Grand Final. Tupou played on the wing in the club's loss against Manly-Warringah.

On 12 October 2011 he was called into the New Zealand national rugby league team squad for the Four Nations tournament.

In 2012, Tupou re-signed with the New Zealand Warriors until the end of the 2014 NRL season.

Tupou joined Canberra on 25 June 2013. He had felt as though he was on the outer with the New Zealand Warriors under new coach Matt Elliot who had preferred others to him on the wing during the 2013 season.

Tupou joined Wakefield Trinity in July 2015 and was well known by Wakefield Trinity fans and Super League fans alike for his aggressive and fearless style of play as a powerful centre. Tupou scored a memorable eleventh-minute hat trick in Wakefield's 42–30 win away at Wigan. On 16 June 2021 he ruptured his patella tendon, resulting in surgery ending his 2021 campaign. Tupou announced on 5 July 2022 he would retire immediately due to complications from the previous injury.
