= Alehana Mara =

Vanuatu international rugby league footballer

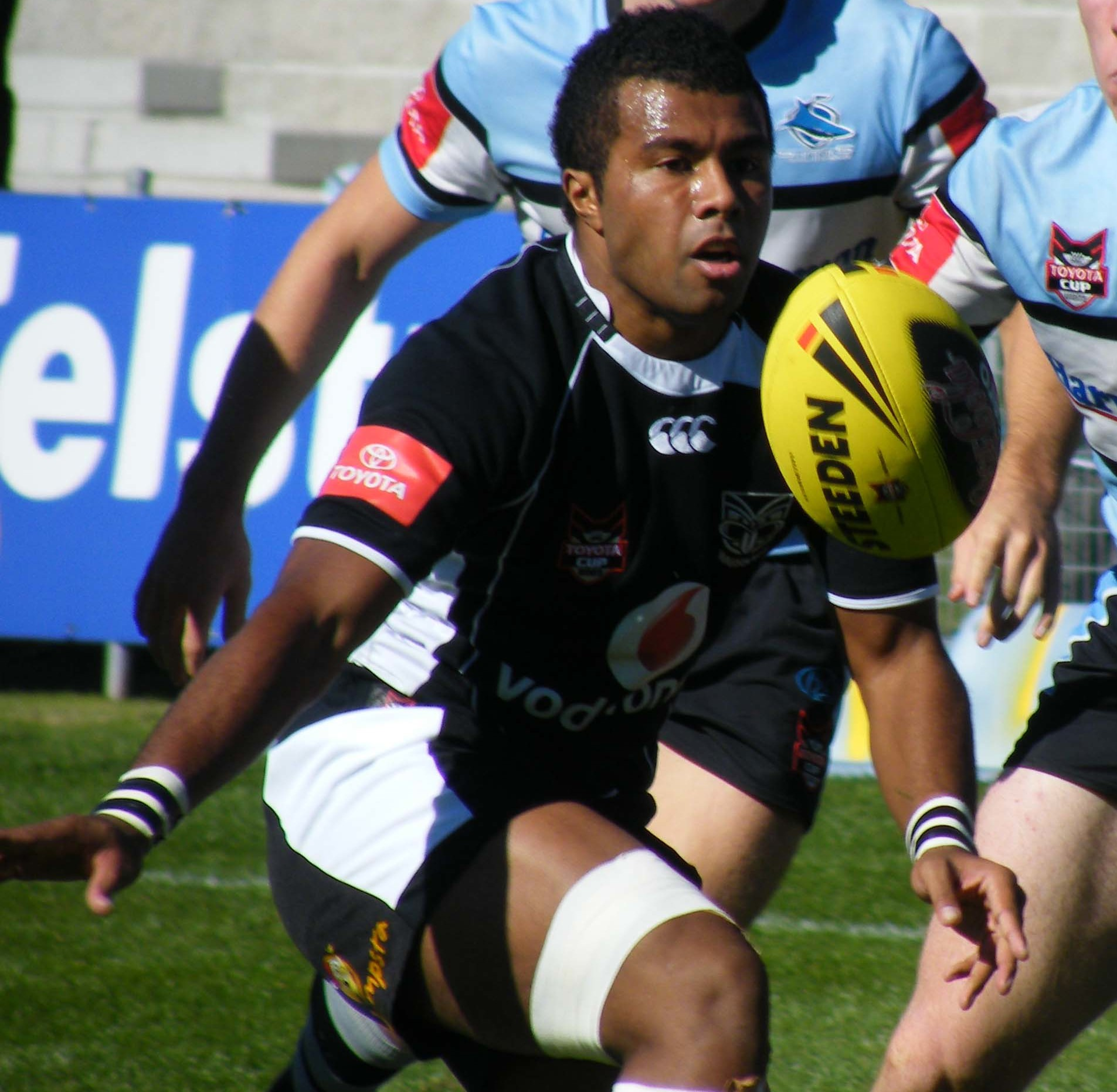

Personal information
- Born: 1 November 1989 (age 37) Porirua, Wellington, New Zealand
- Height: 178 cm (5 ft 10 in)
- Weight: 105 kg (16 st 7 lb)

Playing information
- Position: Hooker
Club
Years	Team	Pld	T	G	FG	P
2010–12	New Zealand Warriors	16	0	0	0	0
Representative
Years	Team	Pld	T	G	FG	P
2012–	Vanuatu	3	0	0	1	1

Alehana Mara (born 6 November 1989) is a Tokelauan former professional international rugby league footballer who last played for the Wynnum Manly Seagulls in the Queensland Cup. Mara previously played for the New Zealand Warriors in the National Rugby League.

== Early life ==
Born in Wellington, New Zealand, Mara is of Ni-Vanuatu descent through his father, and Tokelauan descent through his mother. He attended St Patrick's College and represented the school in rugby union. Mara played his junior rugby league for the St George club in the Wellington Rugby League competition. He represented the Junior Kiwis in 2006 and the NZ under-18 team in 2007 before going onto play for the Wellington Orcas in the Bartercard Cup.

== Playing career ==
Mara joined the New Zealand Warriors in 2008 for the inaugural season of the Under 20's National Youth Competition. He played 39 games for the Juniors Warriors over two seasons, scoring eleven tries and finishing the 2009 season as the squads' captain.

When he moved into the Warriors' first grade squad, Mara found himself behind Nathan Friend as the team's first choice hooker. He spent much of his time playing for the Warriors' feeder team, the Auckland Vulcans, in the New South Wales Cup. He made his NRL for the Warriors on 21 August 2010 against the Manly-Warringah Sea Eagles. In May 2011, Mara re-signed with the Warriors until the end of 2013. Mara represented Vanuatu in their first ever Test match, against Greece on 20 October 2012.

In 2014, Mara joined the Wynnum Manly Seagulls in the Queensland Cup competition. Mara played with Wynnum Manly up until the end of 2016.
