= Lewis Brown (rugby league) =

New Zealand international rugby league footballer

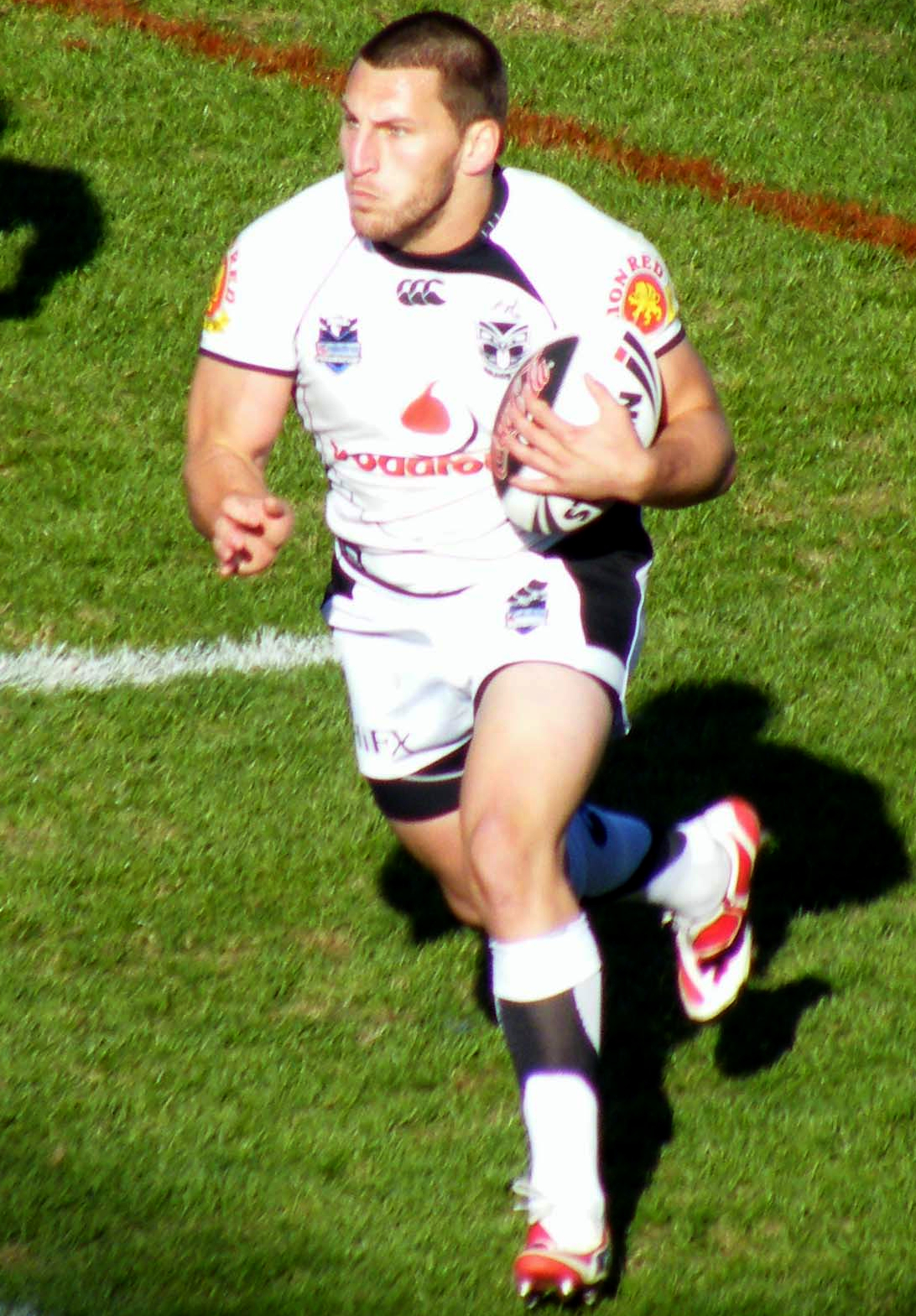

Personal information
- Born: 3 October 1986 (age 40) Christchurch, New Zealand

Playing information
- Height: 179 cm (5 ft 10 in)
- Weight: 96 kg (15 st 2 lb)
- Position: Second-row, Centre, Hooker
Club
Years	Team	Pld	T	G	FG	P
2009–12	New Zealand Warriors	84	19	0	0	76
2013–16	Penrith Panthers	66	9	0	0	36
2016–18	Manly Sea Eagles	48	5	0	0	20
	Total	198	33	0	0	132
Representative
Years	Team	Pld	T	G	FG	P
2010	New Zealand Māori	1	0	0	0	0
2010–16	New Zealand	15	1	0	0	4

Lewis Brown (born 3 October 1986), also known by the nickname of "Sharky", is a New Zealand former professional rugby league footballer who played in the 2000s and 2010s, who played for the New Zealand Warriors, Penrith Panthers and Manly Warringah Sea Eagles in the National Rugby League. He primarily played at second-row, but could also fill in at centre or hooker.

== Background ==
Brown was born in Christchurch, New Zealand.

== Early years ==
Brown who is of Māori Descent started his rugby league career playing for the Riccarton Knights in Christchurch and attending Papanui High School. He played junior representative football for Canterbury and was a New Zealand under-16 representative. He debuted for the Canterbury Bulls in the 2005 Bartercard Cup.

Brown is related to former New Zealand representative Brendon Tuuta.

== Playing career ==
Brown moved to Sydney, playing for Cronulla's feeder side Griffith. There he was spotted by scouts from the Sydney Roosters and they signed him for their Jersey Flegg Cup side.

He later moved to join Balmain-Ryde and the Wests Tigers, playing for their New South Wales Cup side. While he was a feature in the Premier League side, he could not break into the first grade side due to the presence of Robbie Farah and John Morris.

In 2008, the Warriors announced that they had secured Brown for the 2009 season on a one-year deal, with an option for another year. He joined the Warriors in October 2008 but arrived with a major foot injury, which hampered his pre-season. He made his National Rugby League debut for the Warriors on 3 May 2009, playing against the St George Illawarra Dragons. In 2010, he signed an extended contract that kept him at the Warriors until 2012.

In the 2011 NRL season, Brown played 22 games including the 2011 NRL Grand Final which the New Zealand Warriors lost 24–10 against Manly-Warringah at ANZ Stadium. On 28 March 2012, Brown signed a three-year contract with the Penrith Panthers, commencing in the 2013 NRL season.

In the 2014 NRL season, Brown played 22 games including Penrith's preliminary final defeat by Canterbury-Bankstown at ANZ Stadium.

On 20 June 2015, Brown signed a three-year contract with the Manly Warringah Sea Eagles starting in 2016. Brown was released by Manly-Warringah Sea Eagles at the end of the 2018 NRL season which saw the club finish second last after a horror year on and off the field. On 16 January 2019, Brown announced his retirement from rugby league.

== Post playing ==
On 27 May 2024, it was announced that Brown had returned to the New Zealand Warriors club in a behind the scenes role to help design future club merchandise and team jerseys.

== Representative career ==
Brown was named in the New Zealand national rugby league team for the 2010 Four Nations and played for the New Zealand Māori against England in the build up to the tournament.

Lewis Brown made his international debut for the New Zealand national rugby league team in the 2011 ANZAC Test against Australia. He was originally named on an extended bench, and made his debut after Greg Eastwood withdrew through injury. He also set up Kiwis' debutant winger Matt Duffie for a try in the 36th minute of the game. Made a tremendous impact within minutes of taking the field during the first half of the Australia V. New Zealand Four Nations game, scoring an impressive try as a result of a Greg Inglis knock on.
