= Simon Mannering =

New Zealand rugby league footballer

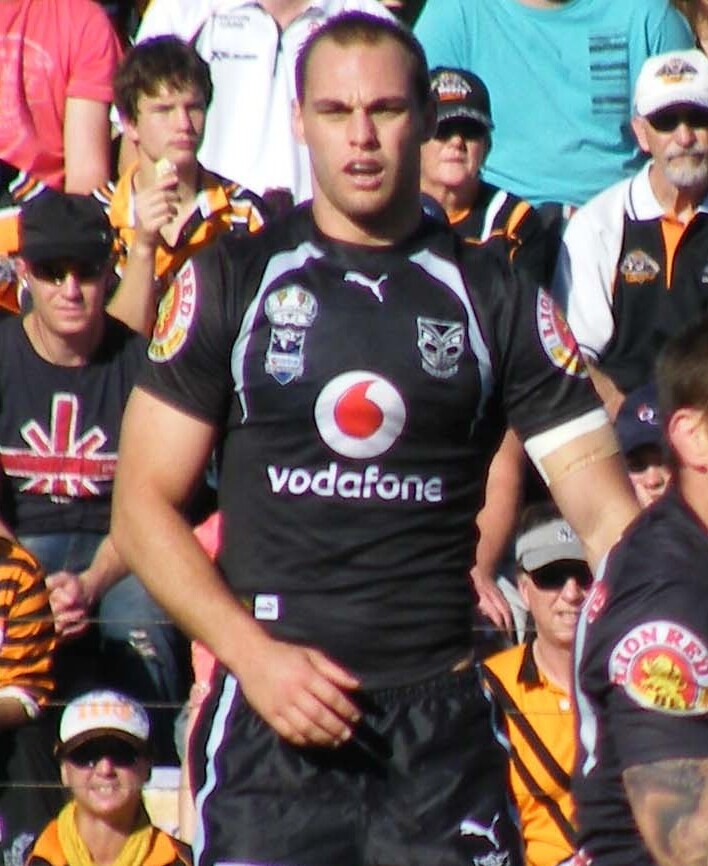

Personal information
- Full name: Simon Alexander Mannering
- Born: 28 August 1986 (age 40) Napier, Hawkes Bay, New Zealand

Playing information
- Height: 193 cm (6 ft 4 in)
- Weight: 105 kg (16 st 7 lb)
- Position: Second-row, Lock, Centre
Club
| Years | Team | Pld | T | G | FG | P |
|---|---|---|---|---|---|---|
| 2005–18 | New Zealand Warriors | 301 | 63 | 0 | 0 | 252 |
Representative
| Years | Team | Pld | T | G | FG | P |
| 2006–17 | New Zealand | 45 | 7 | 0 | 0 | 24 |

Simon Alexander Mannering (born 28 August 1986) is a New Zealand former professional rugby league footballer who played in the 2000s and 2010s. He played for the New Zealand Warriors in the NRL. A New Zealand international second row forward, who could also play as a centre. He was appointed the New Zealand national team's captain in 2013 and was replaced by Jesse Bromwich in 2016 and was part of the 2008 World Cup-winning Kiwis team. Mannering was a one-club player who played his whole NRL career with the Warriors. With 301 appearances for the Warriors, Mannering is the club's most capped player.

== Early years ==
Mannering moved to Motueka at an early age and was educated at Motueka High School and then at Nelson College from 2000 to 2004, where he played rugby union. After being spotted by rugby league development officer Paul Bergman, Mannering switched codes and was an instant success, making the national secondary schools team after just three games of rugby league.

In 2004 Mannering moved to Wellington to play for the Wellington under-18 side, joining the Wellington Rugby League Academy at WelTec. He then was selected for the Paul Bergman-coached Wellington Orcas in the Bartercard Cup. In 2004, Mannering made the Junior Kiwi's and the New Zealand A side. Mannering received interest from the Bulldogs and Parramatta before deciding to move to Auckland and join the New Zealand Warriors.

== Professional playing career ==
=== 2005 ===
Mannering made his NRL debut for the Warriors against the Brisbane Broncos in 2005. The match was special as it marked the Warriors' 10th-anniversary match and they upset the then competition leaders for the second time that year.

=== 2006 ===
In 2006, Mannering was selected in the New Zealand national rugby league team squad for the 2006 Tri Nations tournament. He played in every game of the series for the Kiwis and was named Rookie of the Year for the Kiwis.

=== 2007 ===
Mannering was selected to play for the New Zealand national team at centre in the 2007 ANZAC Test loss against Australia. Mannering was also one of the nominees for 2007 New Zealand Rugby League Player of the Year.

=== 2008 ===
Mannering played all 26 games for the Warriors in 2008 and was named the club's player of the year. In August 2008, Mannering was named in the New Zealand training squad for the 2008 Rugby League World Cup, and in October 2008 he was named in the final 24-man Kiwi squad. In the Kiwis' second match of the tournament, against Papua New Guinea, he scored two tries. He also played in the side that won the final.

=== 2009 ===
In 2009 Mannering signed a new contract with the club that expires after the 2012 season. He played centre for 20 games in the season for the Warriors to forget.

=== 2010 ===
Mannering was appointed the Warriors club captain for the 2010 season.

Mannering missed the Kiwis' ANZAC Test match clash with Australia due to injury. Following the 2010 NRL Season, he was selected in the Kiwis' Squad for the 2010 Four Nations tournament and played off the bench in the Four Nations warm-up Test game against Samoa at Auckland's Mount Smart Stadium, which the Kiwis won 50–6.

During the Four Nations, Mannering featured in all of the Kiwis' regular tournament games at Second Row. Following New Zealand's lost to Australia at Eden Park (Round 3 of the tournament), coach Stephen Kearney selected him in the centres for the Grand final against Australia at Brisbane's Suncorp Stadium. New Zealand won the game 16-12 and the 2010 Four Nations tournament.

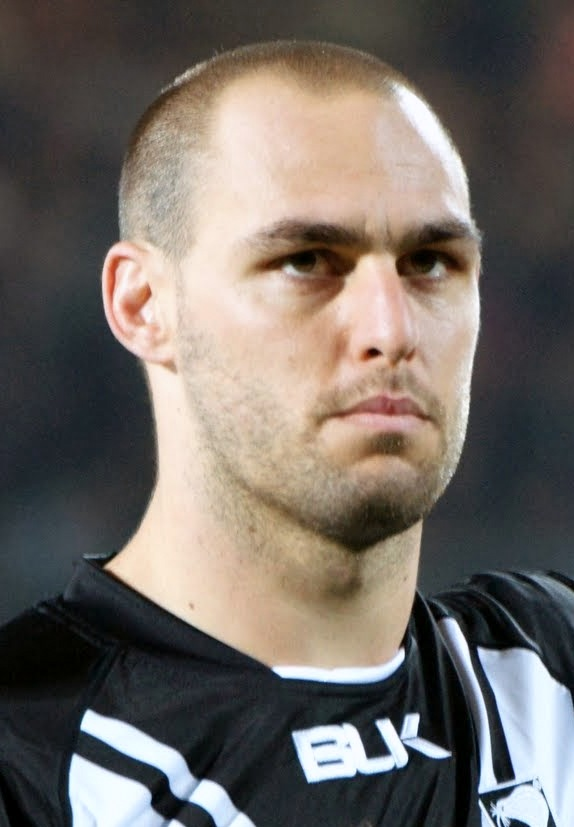
Mannering playing for New Zealand

=== 2011 ===
In 2011, Mannering lead the Warriors to their second Grand Final appearance and he captained the side in the 2011 NRL Grand Final, playing at Second Row against Manly at ANZ Stadium. The Warriors lost the game 24–10. Following the NRL Grand Final, he was selected in the New Zealand Kiwis' Squad for the Newcastle Trans-Tasman Test game against Australia and for the 2011 Four Nations Tournament.

=== 2012 ===
In February 2012, Mannering extended his contract once more to see him linked to the club for another three years, with his new contract expiring in 2015. This new contract will see Mannering become one of the New Zealand Warriors' longest serving players, only beaten by Stacey Jones.

In April 2012, Mannering was selected to play centre for New Zealand in the 2012 ANZAC Test at Eden Park in Auckland. However, Australia won the game 20–12.

In October 2012, Mannering was selected to play lock for the Kiwis in the post-season Trans-Tasman Test game against the Australian Kangaroos at Dairy Farmers Stadium in Townsville, Queensland. However, Australia won the game 18–10.

=== 2013 ===
In February 2013, Mannering replaced Benji Marshall as New Zealand Kiwis captain.

In April 2013, Mannering was originally selected to play New Zealand in the 2013 Anzac Test against Australia at Canberra Stadium and to captain New Zealand for the first time. However, only hours before the test game he was ruled out with a calf injury and Kieran Foran took over the captaincy.

Following the 2013 NRL Season, he was named in the Kiwis' 2013 Rugby League World Cup Squad.

Mannering played in the Kiwis' World Cup warm-up game against the Cook Islands captaining the Kiwis for the first time, playing at second row. The Kiwis went on to win the game 50–0. He played in the Kiwis' first 2013 Rugby League World Cup game against Samoa, playing at lock, and scoring 2 tries in the Kiwis' 42–24 win. The following week, he played in the Kiwis' 48–0 win over France, playing at lock.

Coach Stephen Kearney rested him for the Kiwis' clash against Papua New Guinea.

| Preceded by Benji Marshall | New Zealand national rugby league team captain 2013–2016 | Succeeded by Jesse Bromwich |
