= 2011 St. George Illawarra Dragons season =

- 2011 record: Wins: 14; draws: 1; losses: 9
- Points scored: For: 507; against: 375

Team information
- CEO: (Australia) Peter Doust
- Coach: (Australia) Wayne Bennett
- Assistant coach: (Australia) Steve Price
- Captain: (Australia) Ben Hornby
- Stadium: WIN Jubilee Oval WIN Stadium

Top scorers
- Tries: Matt Cooper (14)
- Goals: Jamie Soward (68)
- Points: Jamie Soward (157)
← 2010	2012 →

The 2011 St. George Illawarra Dragons season was the 13th in the joint venture club's history. Coached by Wayne Bennett and captained by Ben Hornby they competed in the NRL's 2011 Telstra Premiership as defending champions. The Dragons finished the regular season 5th (out of 16) before being knocked out of the finals by the Brisbane Broncos. This was Bennett's last match with the Dragons, as he moved to the Newcastle Knights for the 2012 NRL season.

== Pre-season ==
In the pre-season, the Dragons won their annual Charity Shield match against South Sydney before travelling to take on reigning Super League champions, Wigan Warriors.

The Dragons won all three of their pre-season games. This included a victory in the 2011 World Club Challenge, giving them the title of best club rugby league team in the world.

Date	Round	Opponent	Venue	Score	Attendance	Report
13 February	Charity Shield	South Sydney Rabbitohs	ANZ Stadium, Sydney	32–10	19,267	
18 February	Mercury Challenge	Canterbury-Bankstown Bulldogs	WIN Stadium, Wollongong	28–12	6,174	
27 February	2011 World Club Challenge	Wigan Warriors	DW Stadium, Wigan	21–15	24,268	
Legend: Win Loss Draw

== Regular season ==
By the middle of the regular season the Dragons were leading the competition.

Date	Round	Opponent	Venue	Score	Attendance	Report
12 March	1	Gold Coast Titans	Skilled Park, Gold Coast	25–16	21,709	
21 March	2	Cronulla-Sutherland Sharks	Toyota Stadium, Cronulla	10–16	12,183	
27 March	3	New Zealand Warriors	Mount Smart Stadium, Auckland	25–12	11,651	
3 April	4	Newcastle Knights	Ausgrid Stadium, Newcastle	20–18	20,986	
10 April	5	Canterbury-Bankstown Bulldogs	Sydney Cricket Ground, Sydney	25–6	31,122	
18 April	6	South Sydney Rabbitohs	ANZ Stadium, Sydney	16–0	22,771	
25 April	7 (ANZAC Day Test)	Sydney Roosters	Sydney Football Stadium, Sydney	24–10	34,976	
1 May	8	Parramatta Eels	WIN Jubilee Oval, Kogarah	30–0	19,319	
8 May	9	North Queensland Cowboys	WIN Jubilee Oval, Kogarah	22–8	13,056	
13 May	10	Canterbury-Bankstown Bulldogs	ANZ Stadium, Sydney	15–10	34,322	
	11					
29 May	12	Wests Tigers	WIN Jubilee Oval, Kogarah	24–18	19,892	
3 June	13	Parramatta Eels	Parramatta Stadium, Parramatta	14–14	16,066	
10 June	14	Gold Coast Titans	WIN Jubilee Oval, Kogarah	14–28	10,139	
17 June	15	Brisbane Broncos	Suncorp Stadium, Brisbane	14–21	34,185	
27 June	16	Manly-Warringah Sea Eagles	WIN Stadium, Wollongong	24–6	18,974	
3 July	17	Newcastle Knights	WIN Stadium, Wollongong	10–14	17,205	
	18					
18 July	19	Cronulla-Sutherland Sharks	WIN Jubilee Oval, Kogarah	38–8	16,897	
25 July	20	Canberra Raiders	Canberra Stadium, Canberra	19–24	10,425	
31 July	21	South Sydney Rabbitohs	WIN Stadium, Wollongong	24–34	18,980	
5 August	22	Wests Tigers	Sydney Football Stadium, Sydney	14–16	27,687	
14 August	23	Sydney Roosters	WIN Stadium, Wollongong	12–20	14,141	
19 August	24	Melbourne Storm	AAMI Park, Melbourne	6–8	24,081	
28 August	25	New Zealand Warriors	WIN Stadium, Wollongong	26–22	15,732	
2 September	26	Penrith Panthers	WIN Stadium, Wollongong	32–12	13,621	
Legend: Win Loss Draw Bye

== Finals ==
Date	Round	Opponent	Venue	Score	Attendance	Report
9 September	Qualifying Final	Wests Tigers	ANZ Stadium, Sydney	12 – 21	45,631	
17 September	Semi Final	Brisbane Broncos	Suncorp Stadium, Brisbane	12 – 13	48,474	
Legend: Win Loss Draw Bye

== Ladder ==
2011 NRL Telstra Premiership
Pos.	Team	Pld	W	D	L	B	PF	PA	PD	Pts
1	Melbourne Storm	24	19	0	5	2	521	308	213	42
2	Manly Warringah Sea Eagles (P)	24	18	0	6	2	539	331	208	40
3	Brisbane Broncos	24	18	0	6	2	511	372	139	40
4	Wests Tigers	24	15	0	9	2	519	430	89	34
5	St. George Illawarra Dragons	24	14	1	9	2	483	341	142	33
6	New Zealand Warriors	24	14	0	10	2	504	393	111	32
7	North Queensland Cowboys	24	14	0	10	2	532	480	52	32
8	Newcastle Knights	24	12	0	12	2	478	443	35	28
9	Canterbury-Bankstown Bulldogs	24	12	0	12	2	449	489	-40	28
10	South Sydney Rabbitohs	24	11	0	13	2	531	562	-31	26
11	Sydney Roosters	24	10	0	14	2	417	500	-83	24
12	Penrith Panthers	24	9	0	15	2	430	517	-87	22
13	Cronulla-Sutherland Sharks	24	7	0	17	2	428	557	-129	18
14	Parramatta Eels	24	6	1	17	2	385	538	-153	17
15	Canberra Raiders	24	6	0	18	2	423	623	-200	16
16	Gold Coast Titans	24	6	0	18	2	363	629	-266	16

== Squad ==
St. George Illawarra Dragons
Current NRL premiership squad			Coaching staff
Jack Bosden – PR, SR; Darius Boyd – CE, FB, WG; Matt Cooper – CE; Ben Creagh – SR; Peter Cronin – CE, WG; Adam Cuthbertson – PR, SR; Nick Emmett – CE, SR; Nathan Fien – HK; Mark Gasnier – CE; Bronx Goodwin – FB; David Gower – PR, SR; Jon Green – PR; Michael Greenfield – PR	Ben Hornby (c) – HB, FB; Dan Hunt – PR; Nathan Jones – SR, LK; Cameron King – HK; Jake Marketo – SR, LK; Trent Merrin – PR; Brett Morris – FB, WG; Jason Nightingale – FB, WG; Daniel Penese – SR, LK; Matt Prior – PR, SR; Mitch Rein – HK; Beau Scott – CE, SR; Reece Simmonds – WG	Jamie Soward (gk) – FE; Kyle Stanley – FB, FE; Peni Tagive – CE, WG; Michael Weyman – PR; Dean Young (vc) – HK, LK	Head coach: Wayne Bennett; Assistant coaches: Steve Price; Jeremy Hickmans (performance director); Scott Campbell (strength & conditioning); Adrian Lam (NYC head coach); Legend: (c) Captain(s); (vc) Vice-captain(s); (gk) Goal kicker; Injured; Updated: 29 May 2011; Source(s): Player profiles, Rugby League Project

== Transfers ==
Gains

Player	Gained from
Adam Cuthbertson	Cronulla-Sutherland Sharks
Daniel Penese	Penrith Panthers
David Gower	Wests Tigers

Losses

Player	Lost to
Neville Costigan	Newcastle Knights
Jeremy Smith	Cronulla-Sutherland Sharks
Jarrod Saffy	Melbourne Rebels
Ricky Thorby	North Queensland Cowboys
Michael Lett	Canterbury Bankstown Bulldogs
Beau Henry	Newcastle Knights
Kalifa Faifai Loa	North Queensland Cowboys
Junior Paulo	Penrith Panthers
Luke Priddis	Retirement
