= 2011 Canterbury-Bankstown Bulldogs season =

Canterbury-Bankstown Bulldogs
- 2011 season
- CEO: Todd Greenberg
- Head coach: Kevin Moore (till round 18); Jim Dymock (round 19 onwards)
- Captain: Andrew Ryan
- Top try scorer: Club: Ben Barba 23
- Top points scorer: Club: Steve Turner 124
- Highest home attendance: 32,283
- Lowest home attendance: 8,654
- Average home attendance: 20,787

The 2011 Canterbury-Bankstown Bulldogs season is the 77th in the club's history. They are competing in the National Rugby League's 2011 Telstra Cup Premiership under coach Jim Dymock after Kevin Moore stepped down from the position on 14 July 2011 . The Canterbury-Bankstown Bulldogs finished the regular season in 9th place, failing to qualify for the finals.

== Telstra Premiership ==
=== Draw and Results ===
Round	Home	Score	Away	Match Information
Round	Home	Score	Away	Date and Time	Venue
1	Canterbury Bankstown Bulldogs	24-14	Wests Tigers	Mon 14 March 2011, 7:00pm AEDT	Stadium Australia
2	South Sydney Rabbitohs	19-28	Canterbury Bankstown Bulldogs	Sun 20 March 2011, 2:00pm AEDT	Stadium Australia
3	Canterbury Bankstown Bulldogs	24-20	Sydney Roosters	Sun 27 Mar 2011, 2:00pm AEDT	Stadium Australia
4	Melbourne Storm	30-16	Canterbury Bankstown Bulldogs	Mon 4 Apr 2011, 7:00pm AEST	Stadium Australia
5	Canterbury Bankstown Bulldogs	6-25	St. George Illawarra Dragons	Sun 10 Apr 2011, 3:00pm AEST	Sydney Cricket Ground
6	Parramatta Eels	14-34	Canterbury Bankstown Bulldogs	Fri 15 Apr 2011, 7:30pm AEST	Stadium Australia
7	Canterbury Bankstown Bulldogs	36-24	South Sydney Rabbitohs	Sat 23 Apr 2011, 7:30pm AEST	Stadium Australia
8	Brisbane Broncos	20-12	Canterbury Bankstown Bulldogs	Fri 29 Apr 2011, 7:30pm AEST	Suncorp Stadium
9		BYE
10	Canterbury Bankstown Bulldogs	10-15	St. George Illawarra Dragons	Fri 13 May 2011, 7:30pm AEST	Stadium Australia
11	Canberra Raiders	20-12	Canterbury Bankstown Bulldogs	Fri 20 May 2011, 7:30pm AEST	Canberra Stadium
12	Canterbury Bankstown Bulldogs	28-6	Gold Coast Titans	Fri 27 May 2011, 8:45pm AEST	Suncorp Stadium
13	Canterbury Bankstown Bulldogs	4-38	Manly-Warringah Sea Eagles	Sat 4 Jun 2011, 7:30pm AEST	Stadium Australia
14		BYE
15	Canterbury Bankstown Bulldogs	10-26	Cronulla-Sutherland Sharks	Sun 19 Jun 2011, 2:00pm AEST	Lang Park
16	Wests Tigers	6-16	Canterbury Bankstown Bulldogs	Fri 24 Jun 2011, 7:30pm AEST	Canberra Stadium
17	Penrith Panthers	20-6	Canterbury Bankstown Bulldogs	Sat 2 Jul 2011, 7:30pm AEST	Central Coast Stadium
18	Canterbury Bankstown Bulldogs	18-28	Melbourne Storm	Sat 9 Jul 2011, 7:00pm AEST	Adelaide Oval
19	New Zealand Warriors	36-12	Canterbury Bankstown Bulldogs	Fri 15 Jul 2011, 8:30pm NZST	Mount Smart Stadium
20	Canterbury Bankstown Bulldogs	8-7	Parramatta Eels	Fri 22 Jul 2011, 7:30pm AEST	Stadium Australia
21	Sydney Roosters	32-28	Canterbury Bankstown Bulldogs	Sat 30 Jul 2011, 5:30pm AEST	Sydney Football Stadium
22	Canterbury Bankstown Bulldogs	14-6	North Queensland Cowboys	Fri 5 Aug 2011, 7:30 AEST	Stadium Australia
23	Cronulla-Sutherland Sharks	12-19	Canterbury Bankstown Bulldogs	Mon 15 Aug 2011, 7:00pm AEST	Toyota Stadium
24	Manly-Warringah Sea Eagles	27-16	Canterbury Bankstown Bulldogs	Sun 21 Aug 2011, 2:00pm AEST	Brookvale Oval
25	Canterbury Bankstown Bulldogs	32-22	Newcastle Knights	Sat 27 Aug 2011, 5:30pm AEST	Stadium Australia
26	Canterbury Bankstown Bulldogs	34-22	Canberra Raiders	Sun 4 Sep 2011, 2:00pm AEST	Stadium Australia
Legend: Win Loss Draw Bye

=== Ladder ===
2011 NRL Telstra Premiership
Pos.	Team	Pld	W	D	L	B	PF	PA	PD	Pts
1	Melbourne Storm	24	19	0	5	2	521	308	213	42
2	Manly Warringah Sea Eagles (P)	24	18	0	6	2	539	331	208	40
3	Brisbane Broncos	24	18	0	6	2	511	372	139	40
4	Wests Tigers	24	15	0	9	2	519	430	89	34
5	St. George Illawarra Dragons	24	14	1	9	2	483	341	142	33
6	New Zealand Warriors	24	14	0	10	2	504	393	111	32
7	North Queensland Cowboys	24	14	0	10	2	532	480	52	32
8	Newcastle Knights	24	12	0	12	2	478	443	35	28
9	Canterbury-Bankstown Bulldogs	24	12	0	12	2	449	489	-40	28
10	South Sydney Rabbitohs	24	11	0	13	2	531	562	-31	26
11	Sydney Roosters	24	10	0	14	2	417	500	-83	24
12	Penrith Panthers	24	9	0	15	2	430	517	-87	22
13	Cronulla-Sutherland Sharks	24	7	0	17	2	428	557	-129	18
14	Parramatta Eels	24	6	1	17	2	385	538	-153	17
15	Canberra Raiders	24	6	0	18	2	423	623	-200	16
16	Gold Coast Titans	24	6	0	18	2	363	629	-266	16

== Players ==
=== 2011 Squad ===
2011 Canterbury Bulldogs Season
First team squad			Coaching staff
Chris Armit – PR; Ben Barba – FE, HB; Tim Browne – SR, PR; Greg Eastwood – SR, LK; Michael Ennis – HK; Jake Foster – LK, FE, SR; Bryson Goodwin – WG, FB, CE; Dene Halatau – LK, HK, CE, SR; Michael Hodgson – PR, SR; Trent Hodkinson – HB; Jamal Idris – CE; Sam Kasiano – PR; Kris Keating – FE, HB	Michael Lett – WG, CE, FB; Grant Millington – PR, SR; Josh Morris – WG, CE, FB; Mickey Paea – PR, SR; Corey Payne – SR; Frank Pritchard – SR; Josh Reynolds – HB, HK; Ben Roberts – FE; Joel Romelo – HK; Andrew Ryan (c) – SR; David Stagg – LK, SR; Martin Taupau – PR; Junior Tia-Kilifi – WG	Aiden Tolman – PR, SR; Treya Te Whetu Marama – WG, FB; Robbie Ovseev – SR, LK; Jonathan Wright – CE, WG	Head coach: Jim Dymock; Assistant coaches: Harry Harris (high performance); Tony Grimaldi (head conditioner); Brett Kimmorley; Garry Carden (assistant strength & conditioning); Larry Britton (head trainer); Legend: (c) Captain(s); (vc) Vice-captain(s); Injured; Updated: 25 May 2011; Source(s): Bulldogs NRL Squad, Bulldogs Coaching Staff

*Flags mean countries that players represent.

=== Player movements ===
Signings

- Aiden Tolman from Melbourne Storm
- Trent Hodkinson from Manly-Warringah Sea Eagles
- Kris Keating from Parramatta Eels
- Frank Pritchard from Penrith Panthers
- Greg Eastwood from Leeds Rhinos
- Michael Lett from St George Illawarra Dragons
- Grant Millington from Cronulla Sharks
- Jonathon Wright from Parramatta Eels

Transfers/Leaving

- Luke Patten to Salford City Reds
- Ben Hannant to Brisbane Broncos
- Brett Kimmorley retired
- Jarrad Hickey released
- Danny Williams released
- Yileen Gordon to Penrith Panthers
- Blake Green to Hull Kingston Rovers
- Tim Winitana to Penrith Panthers
- Ratu Tagive to Wests Tigers
- Nathan Massey to Canberra Raiders
- Daniel Harrison to Manly Sea Eagles
- Ryan Tandy released

Re-Signed

- Ben Barba till 2015
- Michael Hodgson till 2011
- Andrew Ryan till 2011
- David Stagg till 2012
- Jake Foster till 2013
- Corey Payne till 2013
- Josh Morris till 2014
- Michael Ennis Till 2014

== See also ==
- List of Canterbury-Bankstown Bulldogs seasons
