= 2011 Gold Coast Titans season =

Sports season

Coordinates: 28°4′1″S 153°22′44″E

- NRL Rank: 16th
- 2011 record: Wins: 6; draws: 0; losses: 18
- Points scored: For: 363; against: 629

Team information
- CEO: Michael Searle
- Coach: John Cartwright
- Captain: Scott Prince
- Stadium: Skilled Park
- Avg. attendance: 15,428
- High attendance: 21,729

Top scorers
- Tries: David Mead (16)
- Goals: Scott Prince (38)
- Points: Scott Prince (96)
← 2010	List of seasons	2012 →

The 2011 Gold Coast Titans season was the 5th in the club's history. They competed in the NRL's 2011 Telstra Premiership coached by John Cartwright and captained by Scott Prince. Gold Coast finished the regular season 16th (out of 16), failing to make the finals and collecting the wooden spoon for the first time in the club's history.

== Season summary ==
The Gold Coast Titans started the season poorly with three first up losses to the reigning premiers St. George Illawarra Dragons, then a 40–12 smashing at the hands of the Melbourne Storm before losing to archrivals the Brisbane Broncos at home. It seemed after the loss to Melbourne that the Titans would never recover and its fans were forecasting a very long season ahead.

Round 4 saw the Titans register their first win for the 2011 season with a 23–22 golden point win over the Canberra Raiders thanks to a Greg Bird field goal in the 2nd minute of extra time. The winning feeling was short-lived with a 10-point loss to the North Queensland Cowboys the following week. Things improved however with the signing of Bulldogs centre Jamal Idris for 5 years and a win against the Wests Tigers in round 6. Round 7 saw the Titans lose their fifth game of the season with the Parramatta Eels scoring a try with 37 seconds remaining to give them a 22–18 victory. A win over the Sydney Roosters in round 8 saw the Titans improve their win–loss record 3–5, and Nathan Friend become the first player to play 100 games for the Titans. This would be the Titans' last win for a while as they lost their next four games, including three at home.

The Titans emerged briefly from their losing streak to beat a depleted St. George Illawarra Dragons missing six players due to Origin before entering a five-game losing streak which included a 36–12 loss to the Cronulla-Sutherland Sharks, which is their worst ever defeat at Skilled Park. To help counter their poor form and last place on the ladder, the Titans lured former dual-international Mat Rogers out of retirement to play out the remainder of the 2011 NRL season. The return did little to change the luck of the Titans with Rogers breaking his foot in his very first game back (although he did achieve a milestone in his comeback, with this being his 200th NRL game) and their poor season continuing with a 22–6 loss against the New Zealand Warriors in round 18. It only got worse for the Titans, with 3 more losses from as many games, including a 30-point thrashing from the Newcastle Knights in round 21.

Round 22 saw the Titans rebound with a gutsy 20–16 win over the Cronulla-Sutherland Sharks but came at a price, with captain Scott Prince breaking his arm and being ruled out for the remainder of the season. The loss of Prince saw retiring club legend Preston Campbell elevated to captain but faced a tough debut against the ladder leading Melbourne Storm. Melbourne easily handled the Titans beating them by 24 points, the game also saw Preston Campbell play his 100th game for the Titans. Round 24 saw the Titans jump two spaces clear of the bottom of the ladder thanks to a 26–18 victory over the Canberra Raiders in front of their lowest ever home crowd of just 10,230.

The Titans had a chance to secure safety from the wooden spoon with a win in Round 25 against the Tigers but instead were soundly beaten by 19 points. Round 26 saw the 15th-placed Titans play the 16th-placed Parramatta Eels in the so-called "Wooden Spoon Showdown", with the loser taking out the wooden spoon for the 2011 season. Despite home ground advantage and wanting to send retiring Preston Campbell out a winner, the Titans gave the Eels a 22-point lead at halftime. The lead proved too much for the Titans, eventually losing 32–12 and collecting the club's first wooden spoon.

=== Milestones ===
- Round 1: Luke Capewell made his debut for the club, after previously playing for the South Sydney Rabbitohs.
- Round 1: Kevin Gordon played his 50th game for the club and his 50th career game.
- Round 2: Preston Campbell played his 250th career game.
- Round 4: Anthony Laffranchi scored his 50th career try.
- Round 5: Matthew White and William Zillman both played their 50th career game for the club.
- Round 6: Michael Henderson played his 100th career game.
- Round 7: Luke Bailey played his 200th career game.
- Round 8: Nathan Friend became the first player to play 100 career games for the club.
- Round 12: Matt Srama made his debut for the club and his debut in the NRL.
- Round 12: Sam Tagataese played his 50th career game.
- Round 14: Mark Minichiello played his 100th career game for the club.
- Round 14: Matt Srama scored his 1st career try.
- Round 15: Scott Prince played his 250th career game.
- Round 16: Brenton Lawrence made his debut for the club and his debut in the NRL.
- Round 18: Mat Rogers played his 200th career game.
- Round 20: Beau Henry made his debut for the club, after previously played for the Newcastle Knights.
- Round 20: Scott Prince played his 100th career game for the club.
- Round 21: Anthony Laffranchi played his 200th career game.
- Round 21: Dominique Peyroux made his debut for the club and his debut in the NRL.
- Round 23: Preston Campbell played his 100th career game for the club.
- Round 23: David Mead played his 50th game for the club and his 50th career game.
- Round 24: Anthony Laffranchi played his 100th career game for the club.
- Round 24: Will Matthews scored his 1st career try.

=== Awards ===
Luke Bailey won a record third Paul Broughton Medal for the club's best and fairest player and also won Clubman of the Year. Matt Srama won Titan's Rookie of the Year while Kevin Gordon who missed the majority of the season with a knee injury won the Community Award. David Mead was awarded Try of the Year for his impressive one-handed pickup from a Scott Prince kick in Round 22 against the Cronulla-Sutherland Sharks. Retiring club legend Preston Campbell took home the Members Choice Player of the Year and became the second inductee into the Titan's Hall of Fame.

== Squad List ==
Gold Coast Titans
First team squad			Coaching staff
Luke Bailey – PR; Greg Bird – FE, LK; Riley Brown – HK; Preston Campbell – FB, FE, HB; Luke Capewell – FE; Nathan Friend – HK; Kevin Gordon – WG, CE; Ashley Harrison – LK, SR; Michael Henderson – PR; Beau Henry – FE (Mid-season gain); Ryan James – LK, SR; Anthony Laffranchi – SR	Brenton Lawrence – PR; Kayne Lawton – HK, HB, CE; Will Matthews – PR, SR; David Mead – WG, FB, CE; Brad Meyers – PR; Steve Michaels – CE; Mark Minichiello – SR; Luke O'Dwyer – SR; Dominique Peyroux – WG; Scott Prince (c) – HB; Jordan Rankin – FE, HB	Ben Ridge – SR; Matt Srama – HB, FE, HK; Sam Tagataese – SR (Mid-season loss); Bodene Thompson – SR; Joe Tomane – CE, WG, FB (Mid-season loss); Esi Tonga – CE; Clinton Toopi – CE; Joe Vickery – WG; Shannon Walker – FB, WG (Mid-season loss); Matt White – PR; William Zillman – FB	Head coach: John Cartwright; Assistant coaches: Trevor Gillmeister; Steve Murphy; Chris McLellan (head strength & conditioning); Ronnie Palmer (strength & conditioning / rehab); Dan Ferris (strength & conditioning assistant); Legend: (c) Captain(s); (vc) Vice-captain(s); Updated: 16 August 2011; Source(s): Titans Squad, Coaches & Trainers

== Squad Movement ==
=== Gains ===
Players	Previous club	Until End of	Notes
Luke Capewell	South Sydney Rabbitohs	?	
Beau Henry	Newcastle Knights (Mid-season)	2013	
Mat Rogers	Retired	2011	
Joe Vickery	St George Illawarra Dragons	?	

=== Losses ===
Players	Club	Until End of	Notes
Jordan Atkins	Parramatta Eels	2012	
Mat Rogers	Retired		
Sam Tagataese	Cronulla Sharks (Mid-season)	2013	
Joe Tomane	Brumbies (Mid-season)	2013	
Shannon Walker	ARU 7's (Mid-season)	?	

=== Re-signings ===
Players	Club	Until End of	Notes
Luke Bailey	Gold Coast Titans	2013	
Preston Campbell	Gold Coast Titans	2012	
Ashley Harrison	Gold Coast Titans	2013	
Matt Srama	Gold Coast Titans	2014	

== Ladder ==
2011 NRL Telstra Premiership
Pos.	Team	Pld	W	D	L	B	PF	PA	PD	Pts
1	Melbourne Storm	24	19	0	5	2	521	308	213	42
2	Manly Warringah Sea Eagles (P)	24	18	0	6	2	539	331	208	40
3	Brisbane Broncos	24	18	0	6	2	511	372	139	40
4	Wests Tigers	24	15	0	9	2	519	430	89	34
5	St. George Illawarra Dragons	24	14	1	9	2	483	341	142	33
6	New Zealand Warriors	24	14	0	10	2	504	393	111	32
7	North Queensland Cowboys	24	14	0	10	2	532	480	52	32
8	Newcastle Knights	24	12	0	12	2	478	443	35	28
9	Canterbury-Bankstown Bulldogs	24	12	0	12	2	449	489	-40	28
10	South Sydney Rabbitohs	24	11	0	13	2	531	562	-31	26
11	Sydney Roosters	24	10	0	14	2	417	500	-83	24
12	Penrith Panthers	24	9	0	15	2	430	517	-87	22
13	Cronulla-Sutherland Sharks	24	7	0	17	2	428	557	-129	18
14	Parramatta Eels	24	6	1	17	2	385	538	-153	17
15	Canberra Raiders	24	6	0	18	2	423	623	-200	16
16	Gold Coast Titans	24	6	0	18	2	363	629	-266	16

== Fixtures ==
=== Pre-season ===
Date	Round	Opponent	Venue	Score	Tries	Goals	Attendance
Saturday, 12 February	Trial 1	Brisbane Broncos	Kougari Oval	18 – 42	Tonga (2), Tagataese, O'Dwyer	Vickery (1)	3,500
Saturday, 19 February	Trial 2	South Sydney Rabbitohs	BCU International Stadium	42 – 4	Campbell (2), Toopi, Mead, Vickery, Bird, Michaels, Peyroux	Vickery (3), Prince (1), Rankin (1)	6,125
Saturday, 26 February	Trial 3	North Queensland Cowboys	Barlow Park	24 – 22	Gordon, Prince, Mead, Tomane	Prince (4)	-
Legend: Win Loss Draw

=== Regular season ===
Date	Round	Opponent	Venue	Score	Tries	Goals	Attendance
Saturday, 12 March	Round 1	St. George Illawarra Dragons	Skilled Park	16 – 25	Michaels, Harrison, Tagataese	Prince (2/3)	21,729
Saturday, 19 March	Round 2	Melbourne Storm	AAMI Park	12 – 40	Capwell, Zillman	Prince (2/2)	12,391
Friday, 25 March	Round 3	Brisbane Broncos	Skilled Park	8 – 14	Michaels	Prince (2/2)	20,226
Saturday, 2 April	Round 4	Canberra Raiders	Canberra Stadium	23 – 22	Bird, Meyers, Thompson, Laffranchi	Campbell (2/2), Bird (1/2) & (FG)	12,165
Friday, 8 April	Round 5	North Queensland Cowboys	Dairy Farmers Stadium	12 – 22	Michaels, Tonga	Prince (2/2)	13,651
Friday, 15 April	Round 6	Wests Tigers	Skilled Park	20 – 14	Zillman (2), Prince, Minichiello	Prince (2/4)	17,221
Sunday, 24 April	Round 7	Parramatta Eels	Parramatta Stadium	18 – 22	Michaels, Bird, Zillman	Prince (3/3)	10,052
Saturday, 30 April	Round 8	Sydney Roosters	Skilled Park	24 – 13	Zillman (2), Michaels, Mead	Prince (4/4)	15,177
Sunday, 8 May	Round 9	New Zealand Warriors	Skilled Park	14 – 34	Mead (3)	Prince (1/3)	17,285
Monday, 16 May	Round 10	Manly-Warringah Sea Eagles	Skilled Park	12 – 16	Prince, Tonga	Prince (2/2)	12,360
	Round 11	Bye					
Friday, 27 May	Round 12	Canterbury-Bankstown Bulldogs	Suncorp Stadium	6 – 28	Prince	Prince (1/1)	32,283
Saturday, 4 June	Round 13	Penrith Panthers	Skilled Park	10 – 23	Mead, Campbell	Prince (1/2)	12,262
Friday, 10 June	Round 14	St. George Illawarra Dragons	WIN Jubilee Oval	28 – 14	Tomane, Prince, Minichiello, Mead, Srama	Prince (4/6)	10,139
Friday, 17 June	Round 15	South Sydney Rabbitohs	ANZ Stadium	8 – 31	Mead, Tomane	Prince (0/2)	8,021
Saturday, 25 June	Round 16	Cronulla-Sutherland Sharks	Skilled Park	12 – 36	Mead, Tonga, Michaels	Prince (0/3)	12,997
	Round 17	Bye					
Friday, 8 July	Round 18	New Zealand Warriors	Mt Smart Stadium	6 – 22	Zillman	Prince (1/2)	10,780
Friday, 15 July	Round 19	Brisbane Broncos	Suncorp Stadium	10 – 30	Michaels, Mead	Prince (1/2)	31,035
Saturday, 23 July	Round 20	North Queensland Cowboys	Skilled Park	20 – 28	Zillman (2), Michaels	Prince (4/4)	15,741
Sunday, 31 July	Round 21	Newcastle Knights	Ausgrid Stadium	20 – 50	Mead, Prince, Bird, Thompson	Prince (2/4)	17,327
Saturday, 6 August	Round 22	Cronulla-Sutherland Sharks	Toyota Stadium	20 – 16	Mead (2), Zillman	Prince (4/5)	6,313
Saturday, 13 August	Round 23	Melbourne Storm	Skilled Park	16 – 40	Michaels, Thompson, Mead	Campbell (2/4)	11,663
Saturday, 20 August	Round 24	Canberra Raiders	Skilled Park	26 – 18	Peyroux, Matthews, Mead, Michaels	Campbell (5/5)	10,230
Monday, 29 August	Round 25	Wests Tigers	Campbelltown Stadium	10 – 39	Minichiello, Mead	Campbell (1/2)	14,378
Saturday, 3 September	Round 26	Parramatta Eels	Skilled Park	12 – 32	O'Dwyer, Mead	Campbell (1/1), Laffranchi (1/1)	18,265
Legend: Win Loss Draw Bye

== Statistics ==
Name	App	T	G	FG	Pts
Luke Bailey	21	0	0	0	0
Greg Bird	19	3	1	1	15
Riley Brown	6	0	0	0	0
Preston Campbell	19	1	11	0	26
Luke Capewell	7	1	0	0	4
Nathan Friend	4	0	0	0	0
Kevin Gordon	2	0	0	0	0
Ashley Harrison	13	1	0	0	4
Michael Henderson	16	0	0	0	0
Beau Henry	4	0	0	0	0
Ryan James	14	0	0	0	0
Anthony Laffranchi	14	1	1	0	6
Brenton Lawrence	9	0	0	0	0
Kayne Lawton	1	0	0	0	0
Will Matthews	5	1	0	0	4
David Mead	24	16	0	0	64
Brad Meyers	2	1	0	0	4
Steve Michaels	23	10	0	0	40
Mark Minichiello	23	3	0	0	12
Luke O'Dwyer	19	1	0	0	4
Dominique Peyroux	4	1	0	0	4
Scott Prince	19	5	38	0	96
Jordan Rankin	8	0	0	0	0
Ben Ridge	11	0	0	0	0
Mat Rogers	1	0	0	0	0
Matt Srama	14	1	0	0	4
Sam Tagataese	8	1	0	0	4
Bodene Thompson	22	3	0	0	12
Joe Tomane	3	2	0	0	8
Esikeli Tonga	12	3	0	0	12
Clinton Toopi	13	0	0	0	0
Matthew White	23	0	0	0	0
William Zillman	24	10	0	0	40
Totals	–	65	51	1	363

== Representative honours ==
The following players played a representative match during the 2011 NRL Season.

Indigenous All Stars

- Greg Bird
- Ryan James
- Scott Prince

NSW Blues

- Greg Bird

NSW City Origin

- Mark Minichiello

NRL All Stars

- Ashley Harrison

Queensland Maroons

- Ashley Harrison

Prime Minister's XIII

- Greg Bird
