= 2011 Sydney Roosters season =

- NRL rank: 11th
- 2011 record: Wins: 10; draws: 0; losses: 14
- Points scored: For: 417 (74tries, 59goals, 3fieldgoals);

Team information
- CEO: Steve Noyce
- Coach: Brian Smith
- Captain: Braith Anasta
- Stadium: Sydney Football Stadium

Top scorers
- Tries: Joseph Leilua 11
- Goals: Braith Anasta 41
- Points: Braith Anasta 91
← 2010	2012 →

The 2011 Sydney Roosters season was the 104th in the club's history. Coached by Brian Smith and captained by Braith Anasta, they competed in the NRL's 2011 Telstra Premiership . However, the Roosters finished 11th (out of 16), failing to reach the finals.

2011 NRL Telstra Premiership
Pos.	Team	Pld	W	D	L	B	PF	PA	PD	Pts
1	Melbourne Storm	24	19	0	5	2	521	308	213	42
2	Manly Warringah Sea Eagles (P)	24	18	0	6	2	539	331	208	40
3	Brisbane Broncos	24	18	0	6	2	511	372	139	40
4	Wests Tigers	24	15	0	9	2	519	430	89	34
5	St. George Illawarra Dragons	24	14	1	9	2	483	341	142	33
6	New Zealand Warriors	24	14	0	10	2	504	393	111	32
7	North Queensland Cowboys	24	14	0	10	2	532	480	52	32
8	Newcastle Knights	24	12	0	12	2	478	443	35	28
9	Canterbury-Bankstown Bulldogs	24	12	0	12	2	449	489	-40	28
10	South Sydney Rabbitohs	24	11	0	13	2	531	562	-31	26
11	Sydney Roosters	24	10	0	14	2	417	500	-83	24
12	Penrith Panthers	24	9	0	15	2	430	517	-87	22
13	Cronulla-Sutherland Sharks	24	7	0	17	2	428	557	-129	18
14	Parramatta Eels	24	6	1	17	2	385	538	-153	17
15	Canberra Raiders	24	6	0	18	2	423	623	-200	16
16	Gold Coast Titans	24	6	0	18	2	363	629	-266	16

== Player Summary ==
Sydney Roosters 2011	Appearance	Interchange	Tries	Goals	F/G	Points
Braith Anasta	24	-	2	41	1	91
Tinirau Arona	-	13	-	-	-	0
Mitchell Aubusson	6	2	1	-	-	4
Justin Carney	12	-	3	-	-	12
Todd Carney	16	-	6	18	1	61
Daniel Conn	-	5	-	-	-	0
Boyd Cordner	6	1	-	-	-	0
Jonathan Ford	-	1	-	-	-	0
Jake Friend	18	6	3	-	-	12
Phil Graham	11	-	3	-	-	12
Aidan Guerra	11	3	6	-	-	24
Martin Kennedy	8	-	1	-	-	4
Shaun Kenny-Dowall	20	-	9	-	-	36
Mark Khierallah	1	-	-	-	-	0
Joseph Leilua	23	-	11	-	-	44
Kane Linnett	10	-	2	-	-	8
Mose Masoe	3	17	1	-	-	4
Willie Mataka	2	-	-	-	-	0
Anthony Minichiello	20	-	6	-	-	24
Anthony Mitchell	1	9	-	-	-	0
Nate Myles	16	1	1	-	-	4
Steve Naughton	3	-	-	-	-	0
Frank-Paul Nuuausala	17	2	4	-	-	16
Mitchell Pearce	21	-	3	-	1	13
Sam Perrett	12	-	5	-	-	20
Rhys Pritchard	2	-	-	-	-	0
Mark Riddell	5	6	-	-	-	0
Jason Ryles	17	3	2	-	-	8
Tom Symonds	9	3	2	-	-	8
Brad Takairangi	4	7	2	-	-	8
Lama Tasi	2	7	-	-	-	0
Francis Vaiotu	1	-	-	-	-	0
Jared Waerea-Hargreaves	11	10	1	-	-	4
Total	312	96	74	59	3	417
