= 2011 Canberra Raiders season =

- NRL Rank: 15th
- 2011 record: Wins: 6; losses: 18
- Points scored: For: 293; against: 355

Team information
- CEO Chairman: Don Furner Jr. John McIntyre
- Coach: David Furner
- Captain: Alan Tongue
- Stadium: Canberra Stadium
- Avg. attendance: 13,413
- High attendance: 16,146 (vs. Brisbane Broncos)

Top scorers
- Tries: 10 – Blake Ferguson
- Goals: 40 – Jarrod Croker
- Points: 104 – Jarrod Croker
← 2010	List of seasons	2012 →

The 2011 Canberra Raiders season was the 30th in the club's history. Coached by David Furner and captained by Alan Tongue, they competed in the NRL's 2011 Telstra Premiership, finishing the regular season 15th (out of 16) so failing to make the play-offs.

== Season summary ==
Following on from an encouraging 2010 season where the Raiders made it to the second week of the finals for the first time in 7 years, the Raiders will be looking to seriously challenge for the title in 2011. The club has managed to keep the bulk of its exciting young roster together, whilst adding experienced campaigners Brett White and former Dally M medalist Matt Orford to the team. Young speedster Blake Ferguson has also been recruited by the Raiders from the Cronulla Sharks for the 2011 season.

The Raiders have performed well below expectations since their convincing Round 1 victory against the Cronulla Sharks. New recruit Blake Ferguson has been a shining light, having scored a team high 10 tries so far this season for the Canberra Raiders, including a hat-trick against the Wests Tigers in Round 3. Matt Orford is yet to make a considerable impact for the Green Machine in 2011.

The Raiders equalled their longest ever losing streak of 8 matches between Round 2 and Round 9, and only managed to avoid breaking their longest ever losing streak with a shock win against the Melbourne Storm in Round 10. Melbourne were at odds of $1.14 to win the game before going on to lose 20–12. Canberra holds on to slim hopes of making the finals at the end of the 2011 season. Based on previous seasons, Raiders would be expected to need to win at least 7 of their remaining 9 matches to make the Top 8.

== Results ==
Trial Games
Round	Opponent	Result	Can.	Opp.	Date	Venue	Crowd
Trial 1	Melbourne Storm	Loss	4	24	19 Feb	Bega Recreation Ground	6,169
Trial 2	Canterbury-Bankstown Bulldogs	Loss	18	30	26 Feb	Scully Park Tamworth	4,000

Colour	Result
Green	Win
Red	Loss
Yellow	Golden point Win

=== Telstra Premiership ===
Round 1; 13 March 2011; 2:00pm Local	Canberra Raiders	40–12	Cronulla Sharks	Canberra Stadium, Canberra
	Tries: Ferguson, Vidot, Tilse, Fensom, Picker, Croker, McCrone; Goals: Croker 6/7; Field Goals:		Tries: Douglas, Gardner; Goals: Williams 2/2; Field Goals:	Attendance: 13,450; Referee: Ashley Klein, Adam Devcich Report:

Round 2; 18 March 2011; 8:30pm Local	Canberra Raiders	4–20	Brisbane Broncos	Canberra Stadium, Canberra
	Tries: Ferguson; Goals: Croker 0/1; Field Goals:		Tries: Gillett, Yow Yeh, Hoffman; Goals: Parker 4/4; Field Goals:	Attendance: 16,146; Referee: Matt Cecchin, Steve Lyons Report:

Round 3; 26 March 2011; 7:30pm Local	Wests Tigers	34–24	Canberra Raiders	Campbelltown Stadium, Campbelltown
	Tries: Fifita, Utai, Lui, Lawrence, Heighington, Ayshford; Goals: Marshall 5/8; Field Goals:		Tries: Ferguson (3), Dugan, Vidot; Goals: Croker 2/5; Field Goals:	Attendance: 14,091; Referee: Jason Robinson, Chris James Report:

Round 4; 2 April 2011; 5:30pm Local	Canberra Raiders	22 – 23 AET	Gold Coast Titans	Canberra Stadium, Canberra
	Tries: Thompson, Vidot, Croker, Tilse; Goals: Croker 3/4; Field Goals:		Tries: Thompson, Bird, Laffranchi, Meyers; Goals: Campbell 2/2, Bird 1/2; Field Goals: Bird	Attendance: 12,165; Referee: Steve Lyons, Matt Cecchin Report:

Round 5 (Heritage Round); 9 April 2011; 7:30pm Local	Penrith Panthers	36–10	Canberra Raiders	Centrebet Stadium, Penrith
	Tries: Simmons (3), Burns, Gordon, Civoniceva; Goals: Gordon 6/7; Field Goals:		Tries: Robinson, Vidot; Goals: Croker 1/2; Field Goals:	Attendance: 10,229; Referee: Gavin Badger, Brett Suttor Report:

Round 6; 16 April 2011; 7:30pm Local	North Queensland Cowboys	26–18	Canberra Raiders	Dairy Farmers Stadium, Townsville
	Tries: Thurston, Hall, Winterstein, Bolton; Goals: Thurston 5/5; Field Goals:		Tries: Ferguson (2), Fensom; Goals: Croker 3/3; Field Goals:	Attendance: 10,741; Referee: Gavin Badger, Steve Lyons Report:

Round 7 (ANZAC Day/Easter); 24 April 2011; 2:00pm Local	Canberra Raiders	12–22	Newcastle Knights	Canberra Stadium, Canberra
	Tries: Thompson, Harrison; Goals: Croker 2/2; Field Goals:		Tries: Uate (2), McDonnell, McManus; Goals: Gidley 3/4; Field Goals:	Attendance: 11,879; Referee: Matt Cecchin, Gavin Reynolds Report:

Round 8; 1 May 2011; 2:00pm Local	Canberra Raiders	12–49	Wests Tigers	Canberra Stadium, Canberra
	Tries: Dugan (2); Goals: Croker 2/2; Field Goals:		Tries: McKinnon (2), Utai, Marshall, Fifita, Dwyer, Fulton, Heighington; Goals: Marshall 7/7, Moltzen 1/1; Field Goals: Marshall	Attendance: 13,425; Referee: Ashley Klein, Gerard Sutton Report:

Round 9; 9 May 2011; 7:00pm Local	Manly Sea Eagles	20–0	Canberra Raiders	Brookvale Oval, Brookvale
	Tries: B. Stewart (3), Robertson; Goals: Cherry-Evans 2/4; Field Goals:		Tries: Goals: Field Goals:	Attendance: 6,148; Referee: Tony Archer, Steve Lyons Report:

Round 10; 14 May 2011; 5:30pm Local	Melbourne Storm	12–20	Canberra Raiders	AAMI Park, Melbourne
	Tries: Duffie, Proctor; Goals: Smith 2/2; Field Goals:		Tries: Robinson, McCrone, Ferguson; Goals: Croker 4/4; Field Goals:	Attendance: 9,628; Referee: Gerard Sutton, Chris James Report:

Round 11; 20 May 2011; 7:30pm Local	Canberra Raiders	20–12	Canterbury-Bankstown Bulldogs	Canberra Stadium, Canberra
	Tries: Thompson, Robinson, Picker; Goals: Croker 4/5; Field Goals:		Tries: Morris, Barba; Goals: Goodwin 2/2; Field Goals:	Referee: Report:

Round 12	.	Bye	.

Round 13; 5 June 2011; 2:00pm Local	Canberra Raiders	24–40	North Queensland Cowboys	Canberra Stadium, Canberra
	Tries: Goals: Field Goals:		Tries: Goals: Field Goals:

Round 14; 12 June 2011; TBC	Brisbane Broncos	25–24	Canberra Raiders	Suncorp Stadium, Brisbane
	Tries: Goals: Wallace 4/5; Field Goals: Wallace		Tries: Goals: Ferguson 4/4; Field Goals:

Round 15	.	Bye	.

Round 16; 25 June 2011; TBC	Canberra Raiders	25–12	Parramatta Eels	Canberra Stadium, Canberra
	Tries: Goals: Field Goals:		Tries: Goals: Field Goals:

Round 17; 4 July 2011; TBC	Sydney Roosters	12–38	Canberra Raiders	Sydney Football Stadium, Sydney
	Tries: Goals: Field Goals:		Tries: Goals: Field Goals:

Round 18; TBC; TBC	Cronulla Sharks	26–12	Canberra Raiders	Toyota Park, Cronulla
	Tries: Goals: Field Goals:		Tries: Goals: Field Goals:

Round 19; TBC; TBC	Canberra Raiders	0–26	Melbourne Storm	Canberra Stadium, Canberra
	Tries: Goals: Field Goals:		Tries: Goals: Field Goals:

Round 20; TBC; TBC	Canberra Raiders	24–19	St George-Illawarra Dragons	Canberra Stadium, Canberra
	Tries: Goals: Field Goals:		Tries: Goals: Field Goals:

Round 21; TBC; TBC	New Zealand Warriors	29–10	Canberra Raiders	Mt Smart Stadium, Auckland
	Tries: Goals: Field Goals:		Tries: Goals: Field Goals:

Round 22 (Close the Gap Round); TBC; TBC	Newcastle Knights	40–8	Canberra Raiders	Ausgrid Stadium, Newcastle
	Tries: Goals: Field Goals:		Tries: Goals: Field Goals:

Round 23; TBC; TBC	Canberra Raiders	18–47	South Sydney Rabbitohs	Canberra Stadium, Canberra
	Tries: Goals: Field Goals:		Tries: Goals: Field Goals:

Round 24; TBC; TBC	Gold Coast Titans	26–18	Canberra Raiders	Skilled Park, Gold Coast
	Tries: Goals: Field Goals:		Tries: Goals: Field Goals:

Round 25; TBC; TBC	Canberra Raiders	18–19	Penrith Panthers	Canberra Stadium, Canberra
	Tries: Goals: Field Goals:		Tries: Goals: Field Goals:

Round 26; TBC; TBC	Canterbury-Bankstown Bulldogs	36–22	Canberra Raiders	ANZ Stadium, Sydney
	Tries: Goals: Field Goals:		Tries: Goals: Field Goals:

== Squad ==
No.

Position
Player

Glen Buttriss – HK Terry Campese (captain) – FE Jarrod Croker – CE (GK) Josh Dugan – FB Blake Ferguson – CE Shaun Fensom – LK Danny Galea – SR Bronson Harrison – SR Tom Learoyd-Lahrs – PR Drury Low – WG Josh McCrone – FE Nathan Massey – SR Sam Mataora – SR David Milne – FB

No.

Position
Player

Matt Orford – HB Josh Papalii – SR Joe Picker – SR Reece Robinson – WG David Shillington – PR James Stuart – CE Joel Thompson – CE Trevor Thurling – SR Dane Tilse – PR Alan Tongue (captain) – LK Daniel Vidot – WG Travis Waddell – HK Brett White – PR Sam Williams – HB

=== Preseason transfers ===
IN

- Blake Ferguson (from Cronulla Sharks)
- Matt Orford (from Bradford Bulls)
- Brett White (from Melbourne Storm

OUT

- Justin Carney (to Sydney Roosters)
- Marc Herbert (to Bradford Bulls)
- Brett Kelly (to Avignion)
- Adam Mogg (Retirement)
- Joel Monaghan (to Warrington Wolves)
- Scott Logan (Retirement)
- Troy Thompson (to Melbourne Storm)

== Player statistics ==
Name	App	T	G	FG	Pts
Glen Buttriss	11	0	0	0	0
Jarrod Croker	11	2	27	0	62
Josh Dugan	5	3	0	0	12
Shaun Fensom	11	2	0	0	8
Blake Ferguson	11	8	0	0	32
Danny Galea	3	0	0	0	0
Bronson Harrison	11	1	0	0	4
Tom Learoyd-Lahrs	8	0	0	0	0
Josh McCrone	11	2	0	0	8
Nathan Massey	2	0	0	0	0
Sam Mataora	3	0	0	0	0
Josh Miller	8	0	0	0	0
David Milne	2	0	0	0	0
Matt Orford	4	0	0	0	0
Josh Papalii	2	0	0	0	0
Joe Picker	5	2	0	0	8
Reece Robinson	5	3	0	0	12
David Shillington	8	0	0	0	0
Joel Thompson	10	3	0	0	12
Trevor Thurling	9	0	0	0	0
Dane Tilse	10	2	0	0	8
Alan Tongue	6	0	0	0	0
Daniel Vidot	8	4	0	0	16
Travis Waddell	5	0	0	0	0
Brett White	10	0	0	0	0
Sam Williams	5	0	0	0	0
Totals	–	32	27	0	182

== Ladders ==
2011 NRL Telstra Premiership
Pos.	Team	Pld	W	D	L	B	PF	PA	PD	Pts
1	Melbourne Storm	24	19	0	5	2	521	308	213	42
2	Manly Warringah Sea Eagles (P)	24	18	0	6	2	539	331	208	40
3	Brisbane Broncos	24	18	0	6	2	511	372	139	40
4	Wests Tigers	24	15	0	9	2	519	430	89	34
5	St. George Illawarra Dragons	24	14	1	9	2	483	341	142	33
6	New Zealand Warriors	24	14	0	10	2	504	393	111	32
7	North Queensland Cowboys	24	14	0	10	2	532	480	52	32
8	Newcastle Knights	24	12	0	12	2	478	443	35	28
9	Canterbury-Bankstown Bulldogs	24	12	0	12	2	449	489	-40	28
10	South Sydney Rabbitohs	24	11	0	13	2	531	562	-31	26
11	Sydney Roosters	24	10	0	14	2	417	500	-83	24
12	Penrith Panthers	24	9	0	15	2	430	517	-87	22
13	Cronulla-Sutherland Sharks	24	7	0	17	2	428	557	-129	18
14	Parramatta Eels	24	6	1	17	2	385	538	-153	17
15	Canberra Raiders	24	6	0	18	2	423	623	-200	16
16	Gold Coast Titans	24	6	0	18	2	363	629	-266	16

2011 National Youth Competition season
Pos.	Team	Pld	W	D	L	B	PF	PA	PD	Pts
1	New Zealand Warriors (P)	24	19	1	4	2	851	494	+357	43
2	North Queensland Cowboys	24	17	0	7	2	758	509	+249	38
3	Cronulla-Sutherland Sharks	24	16	1	7	2	707	600	+107	37
4	Melbourne Storm	24	16	0	8	2	678	517	+161	36
5	Sydney Roosters	24	15	1	8	2	639	523	+116	35
6	Canterbury-Bankstown Bulldogs	24	14	0	10	2	659	458	+201	32
7	Wests Tigers	24	12	2	10	2	607	529	+78	30
8	Newcastle Knights	24	12	1	11	2	638	660	-22	29
9	Brisbane Broncos	24	11	2	11	2	752	551	+201	28
10	Penrith Panthers	24	12	0	12	2	558	709	-151	28
11	St. George Illawarra Dragons	24	10	2	12	2	562	594	-32	26
12	Parramatta Eels	24	10	1	13	2	547	556	-9	25
13	Canberra Raiders	24	8	1	15	2	683	749	-66	21
14	Gold Coast Titans	24	5	1	18	2	467	779	-312	15
15	South Sydney Rabbitohs	24	4	1	19	2	454	881	-427	13
16	Manly Warringah Sea Eagles	24	4	0	20	2	432	843	-411	12
