= 2011 South Sydney Rabbitohs season =

- NRL rank: First Grade
- 2011 record: Wins: 11; draws: 0; losses: 12
- Points scored: For: 531; against: 562

Team information
- CEO: Shane Richardson
- Coach: John Lang
- Captain: Roy Asotasi Michael Crocker
- Stadium: ANZ Stadium
- Avg. attendance: 17,990

Top scorers
- Tries: Nathan Merritt (23)
- Goals: Chris Sandow (82)
- Points: Chris Sandow (195)
← 2010	2012 →

The 2011 South Sydney Rabbitohs season was the 102nd in South Sydney Rabbitohs's history.

They competed in the NRL's 2011 Telstra Premiership coached by John Lang and captained by Roy Asotasi. The Rabbitohs placed 10th on the competition ladder, after losing a sudden death match against the Knights in Round 26.

The season was the last in the career of coach John Lang, concluding a coaching career spanning 20 years.

Individually, Nathan Merritt received the Dally M Try Scorer of the Year award, finishing equal with the Bulldog's Ben Barba on 23 tries. Chris Sandow received the Dally M Point Scorer of the Year award, after scoring 195 points over the year.

== Preseason ==
In the pre-season the Rabbitohs defeated Newtown in the annual Return to Redfern, before losing to St. George Illawarra in the Charity Shield. Their final trial match against the Titans resulted in a loss.

Date	Round	Opponent	Venue	Score	Attendance	Report
5 February	Return to Redfern	Newtown Jets	ATP Performance Centre, Redfern	10–4	5,000	
13 February	Charity Shield	St. George Illawarra Dragons	ANZ Stadium, Sydney	10–32	19,267	
19 February	Coffs Harbour Trial	Gold Coast Titans	BCU International Stad., Coffs Harbour	4– 42	6,125	
Legend: Win 13+ Win Loss 13+ Loss Draw

== Regular season ==
Date	Round	Opponent	Venue	Score	Attendance	Report
Fri 11 March	1	Sydney Roosters	Sydney Football Stadium, Sydney	29–40	28,703	
Sun 20 March	2	Canterbury-Bankstown Bulldogs	ANZ Stadium, Sydney	19–28	18,271	
Fri 25 March	3	Parramatta Eels	ANZ Stadium, Sydney	32–18	22,153	
Fri 1 April	4	Manly-Warringah Sea Eagles	Bluetongue Stadium, Central Coast	32–30	18,108	
Fri 8 April	5	Wests Tigers	Sydney Football Stadium, Sydney	6–30	22,677	
Mon 18 April	6	St. George Illawarra Dragons	ANZ Stadium, Sydney	0–16	22,771	
Sat 23 April	7	Canterbury-Bankstown Bulldogs	ANZ Stadium, Sydney	24–36	22,352	
Fri 29 April	8	Cronulla Sharks	ANZ Stadium, Sydney	31–12	9,363	
	9	BYE				
Sat 14 May	10	Wests Tigers	ANZ Stadium, Sydney	29–18	18,245	
Sun 22 May	11	New Zealand Warriors	Mount Smart Stadium, Auckland	6–12	16,872	
Mon 30 May	12	Penrith Panthers	Centrebet Stadium, Penrith	10–22	5,703	
Sun 5 June	13	Melbourne Storm	ANZ Stadium, Sydney	6–16	11,528	
	14	BYE				
Fri 17 June	15	Gold Coast Titans	ANZ Stadium, Sydney	31–8	8,021	
Fri 24 June	16	Brisbane Broncos	nib Stadium, Perth	16–12	15,371	
Sun 3 July	17	Cronulla-Sutherland Sharks	Toyota Stadium, Cronulla	4–26	18,829	
Sun 10 July	18	Manly-Warringah Sea Eagles	Brookvale Oval, Manly	22–36	19,856	
Sat 16 July	19	Sydney Roosters	ANZ Stadium, Sydney	21–20	14,671	
Sun 24 July	20	New Zealand Warriors	ANZ Stadium, Sydney	16–48	11,208	
Sun 31 July	21	St. George Illawarra Dragons	WIN Stadium, Wollongong	34–24	18,980	
Mon 8 August	22	Parramatta Eels	ANZ Stadium, Sydney	56–6	13,908	
Sun 14 August	23	Canberra Raiders	Canberra Stadium, Canberra	47–18	12,150	
Fri 19 August	24	North Queensland Cowboys	ANZ Stadium, Sydney	26–24	11,208	
Sun 28 August	25	Brisbane Broncos	Suncorp Stadium, Brisbane	10–22	40,094	
Fri 2 September	26	Newcastle Knights	Ausgrid Stadium, Newcastle	24–42	30,729	
Legend: Win 13+ Win Loss 13+ Loss Draw Bye

== Ladder ==
2011 NRL Telstra Premiership
Pos.	Team	Pld	W	D	L	B	PF	PA	PD	Pts
1	Melbourne Storm	24	19	0	5	2	521	308	213	42
2	Manly Warringah Sea Eagles (P)	24	18	0	6	2	539	331	208	40
3	Brisbane Broncos	24	18	0	6	2	511	372	139	40
4	Wests Tigers	24	15	0	9	2	519	430	89	34
5	St. George Illawarra Dragons	24	14	1	9	2	483	341	142	33
6	New Zealand Warriors	24	14	0	10	2	504	393	111	32
7	North Queensland Cowboys	24	14	0	10	2	532	480	52	32
8	Newcastle Knights	24	12	0	12	2	478	443	35	28
9	Canterbury-Bankstown Bulldogs	24	12	0	12	2	449	489	-40	28
10	South Sydney Rabbitohs	24	11	0	13	2	531	562	-31	26
11	Sydney Roosters	24	10	0	14	2	417	500	-83	24
12	Penrith Panthers	24	9	0	15	2	430	517	-87	22
13	Cronulla-Sutherland Sharks	24	7	0	17	2	428	557	-129	18
14	Parramatta Eels	24	6	1	17	2	385	538	-153	17
15	Canberra Raiders	24	6	0	18	2	423	623	-200	16
16	Gold Coast Titans	24	6	0	18	2	363	629	-266	16

== Statistics ==
Player	Tries	Goals	Field goals	Total points
John Sutton	3	0	0	12
Nathan Merritt	23	0	0	92
Greg Inglis	8	0	0	32
Eddy Pettybourne	3	0	0	12
Chris Sandow	6	78	7	187
Rhys Wesser	6	0	0	24
Fetuli Talanoa	4	0	0	16
Michael Crocker	1	0	0	4
Dylan Farrell	12	0	0	48
Issac Luke	3	2	0	16
David Taylor	3	0	0	12
Chris McQueen	8	0	0	32
James Roberts	5	0	0	20
Jason Clark	1	0	0	4
Nathan Peats	1	0	0	4
Ben Ross	1	0	0	4
Shaune Corrigan	1	0	0	4

== Kit and Sponsors ==
=== Star City Casino ===
The Star City Casino is the Rabbitohs major home sponsor for the 2011 Telstra Premiership.

=== DeLonghi ===
DeLonghi are again the major away sponsor for the Rabbitohs in the 2011 Telstra Premiership.

=== V8 Supercars Australia ===
V8 Supercars are the Rabbitohs major sleeve sponsor for the 2011 Telstra Premiership.

=== Kenwood ===
Kenwood are the Rabbitohs major training sponsor for the 2011 Telstra Premiership.

== playing kit ==
=== Sponsors ===
Period	Kit manufacturer	Naming rights	Shorts sponsor	Youth team sponsor
2011	ISC	The Star and De'Longhi	Alcatel One Touch	Souths Cares

== Squad ==
The following list comprises players who are in the Rabbitohs full-time first-grade squad for the 2011 season in the NRL Telstra Premiership.

South Sydney Rabbitohs
First team squad			Coaching staff
Roy Asotasi (c) – PR; George Burgess – PR; Sam Burgess – SR; Jason Clark – LK, HK; Shaune Corrigan – CE, WG; Michael Crocker (vc) – LK, SR; Beau Falloon – HK; Dylan Farrell – CE, FE; Scott Geddes – PR; Greg Inglis – CE; Blake Judd – LK; Ben Lowe – LK, SR, CE; Issac Luke (gk) – HK	Josh Mansour – WG; Shannan McPherson – SR, PR; Chris McQueen – WG, SR; Nathan Merritt (gk) – WG, FB; Kane Morgan – WG, CE; Matt Mundine – FE, LK; Nathan Peats – HK, SR; Eddy Pettybourne – SR, PR; Adam Reynolds – HB; Ben Ross – PR; Chris Sandow (gk) – HB; Luke Stuart – PR; John Sutton – FE	Fetuli Talanoa – WG; David Taylor – SR, PR; Dave Tyrrell – SR, LK; Taioalo Vaivai – CE, WG; Malcolm Webster – FE, HB; Rhys Wesser – FB; Deon Apps – LK, SR; Luke Burgess – PR	Head coach: John Lang; Assistant coaches: Kurt Wrigley; Gorden Tallis; Legend: (c) Captain(s); (vc) Vice-captain(s); (gk) Goal kicker; Injured; Updated: 21 July 2011; Source(s): Rabbitohs Squad, Rugby League Project

== Transfers ==
Gains

Player	Gained From
Greg Inglis	Melbourne Storm
George Burgess	Bradford Bulls – Super League
Luke Burgess	Leeds Rhinos – Super League (Mid-Season)

Losses

Player	Lost To
Colin Best	Cronulla-Sutherland Sharks
Luke Capewell	Gold Coast Titans
Jaiman Lowe	Melbourne Storm
Beau Champion	Melbourne Storm
Jamie Simpson	Huddersfield Giants – Super League

== Player statistics ==
Player	Appearances	Tries	Goals	Field Goals	Total Points
–	–	–	–	–	–

== Representative honours ==
Player	All Stars	Anzac Test	Pacific Test	City / Country	State of Origin 1	State of Origin 2	State of Origin 3	Four Nations
