= Daniel Penese =

New Zealand rugby league footballer

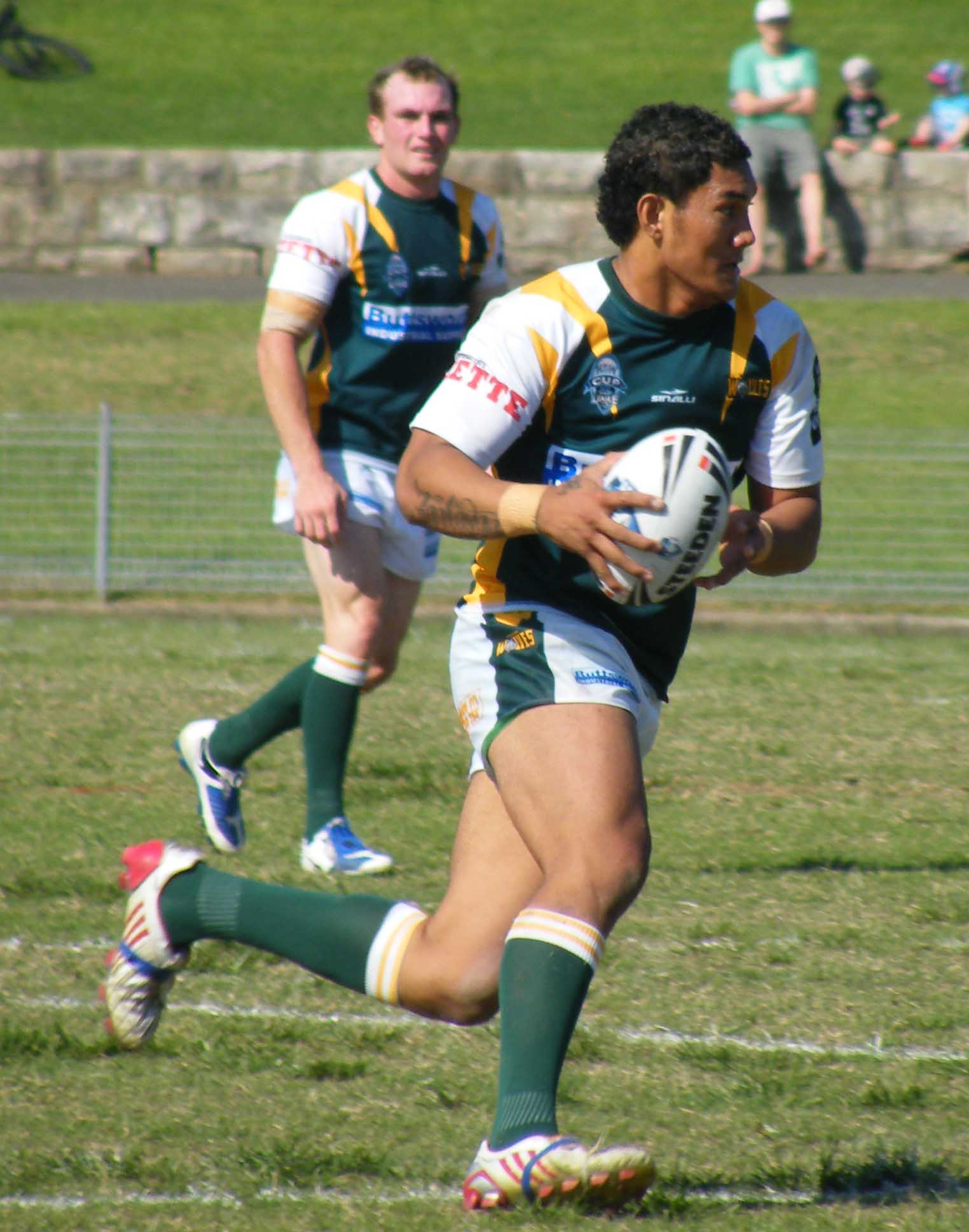

Personal information
- Full name: Daniel Penese
- Born: 1 January 1989 (age 36) Auckland, New Zealand
- Weight: 97 kg (15 st 4 lb)

Playing information
- Position: Second-row, Lock, Centre
Club
Years	Team	Pld	T	G	FG	P
2008	Penrith Panthers	2	0	0	0	0
2013	Sporting Olympique Avignon	25	7	0	0	0
	Total	27	7	0	0	0
- Source: As of 10 Sep 2022

Daniel Penese (born 1 December 1989) in New Zealand is a former professional rugby league footballer who last played in the second-row for the Wyong Roos in the New South Wales Cup competition.

== Early life ==
Penese was educated at Patrician Brothers' College Blacktown and played his junior rugby league for the St Mary's Saints before being signed by the Penrith Panthers.

== Playing career ==
Penese was part of Penrith's Jersey Flegg premiership winning team in 2007 and was a member of the inaugural Under 20s Toyota Cup squad in 2008. Penese made his first grade debut for Penrith in round 25 of the 2008 NRL season against the New Zealand Warriors at Mt Smart Stadium. Penese made one further appearance the following week against Manly. Penese agreed to a deal with the St. George Illawarra Dragons for the 2011 NRL season, although he did not get an opportunity in first grade. Penese then signed a new deal with the Parramatta Eels from 2012 onwards, spending all season with their feeder team, the Wentworthville Magpies. Penese then made his way overseas to France to play for Elite One Championship team Sporting Olympique Avignon. In 2014, Penese joined the Wyong Roos in the New South Wales Cup. In 2015, Penese played for St Mary's in the Penrith Rugby League Competition.
