= 2011 Manly Warringah Sea Eagles season =

- 2011 NRL premiers
- NRL rank: 1st
- 2011 record: Wins: 21; draws: 0; losses: 5
- Points scored: For: 613; against: 340

Team information
- CEO: (Australia) David Perry
- Coach: (Australia) Des Hasler
- Captain: (Australia) Jamie Lyon and Jason King
- Stadium: Brookvale Oval

Top scorers
- Tries: Brett Stewart (15)
- Goals: Jamie Lyon (59)
- Points: Jamie Lyon (154)
← 2010	2012 →

The 2011 Manly Warringah Sea Eagles season was the 62nd in the club's history. Coached by Des Hasler and co-captained by Jamie Lyon and Jason King, they competed in the National Rugby League (NRL) 2011 Telstra Premiership, and finished the regular season in second place (out of 16 teams). The Sea Eagles then qualified for the NRL grand final, in which they defeated the New Zealand Warriors, claiming the club's eighth first-grade premiership.

== Background ==
The Manly Warringah Sea Eagles had finished eighth in the previous season, barely qualifying for the finals series (in fact, had the Melbourne Storm not been heavily penalised for their salary cap breach, Manly would have actually missed the finals). They were defeated by the St George Illawarra Dragons in a qualifying final; the Dragons subsequently won the premiership. Manly lost four first-team players at the end of the season: first-choice halfback Trent Hodkinson, forwards Chris Bailey and Josh Perry, and utility back Ben Farrar. Joining the club were the unheralded Tim Robinson, Liam Foran and Daniel Harrison. Between them, only Foran had first-grade experience.

However, Manly's squad was boosted by the return of star fullback Brett Stewart. After Manly had won the NRL premiership in 2008, Stewart missed all but six matches of the following two seasons with knee injuries and legal issues. Manly's season would also see the emergence of key youngsters such as Queensland born halfback Daly Cherry-Evans, who would win the NRL's Dally M Rookie of the Year award, the continued rise of New Zealand born five-eighth Kieran Foran, and winger Will Hopoate, son of Manly's 1996 premiership-winner John Hopoate, who would debut for New South Wales in the 2011 State of Origin series.

== Season ==
=== Regular season ===
In New Zealand, each of the Sea Eagles matches of the 2011 season were televised free-to-air by Māori Television on Monday nights, dubbed "Manly Night Football". Manly opened their season with an 18–6 loss to the Melbourne Storm, their grand final opponents from 2007 and 2008. Daly Cherry-Evans made his first-grade debut as Manly's starting halfback, but was penalised for a "foot fault" when kicking a line dropout. The following week, Manly played the grand finalists from the previous season, the Sydney Roosters, without co-captains Jamie Lyon and Jason King, and Glenn Stewart and Steve Matai. Despite the losses of key players, the Sea Eagles scored their first win of the season, 27–16, thanks to performances from Cherry-Evans and his halves partner Kieran Foran that the ABC described as "outstanding". Manly won again the following weekend, defeating the Newcastle Knights 26–12. It was Manly's first match of the season at their home ground, Brookvale Oval. An aggressive physical performance from the Sea Eagles saw the Knights reduced to just 13 fit players by the second half, enough to put a full team on the field but with an empty substitutes bench.

April started badly for the Sea Eagles, losing 32–30 to the South Sydney Rabbitohs, and suspending two players—long-serving club veteran Anthony Watmough and squad player Terence Seu Seu—after they were arrested by police and fined for public urination. The following weekend, Manly bounced back with a victory over the Cronulla Sharks in Cronulla, the win being sealed with a try to rookie winger Michael Oldfield in the final seconds of the match. The team then took their record to five wins from seven matches, defeating the New Zealand Warriors at Brookvale, then the Penrith Panthers in Penrith, before their winning streak came to an end with a narrow loss to the North Queensland Cowboys in Townsville. The defeat to the Cowboys came in controversial circumstances. Jamie Lyon was denied a try by the video referee that may have won Manly the match; later, the video referee was removed from duties for the following round after officials considered his decision to have been in error.

Manly started the month of May with a home win over the lowly Canberra Raiders in which Brett Stewart scored his 99th, 100th and 101st tries for the Sea Eagles. It was the first in a six-match winning streak, as Manly then defeated the Gold Coast, Brisbane, Canterbury, North Queensland and arch-rivals Parramatta. The run of wins took the team to second on the NRL ladder. It also helped Manly's players with representative ambitions. Four Sea Eagles featured in the mid-season State of Origin series: Jason King, Anthony Watmough, Glenn Stewart, and, at the age of 19, William Hopoate, who scored a try in his first match for New South Wales and followed his father John in playing for both Manly and his state. At the time, Hopoate announced that he would be leaving professional football at the end of the season to embark on a two-year mormon mission.

Manly's winning streak came to an end in late June, when the team was defeated by the reigning premiers St George Illawarra. The match was played a week after the death of the well-known former Manly player turned commentator Rex Mossop. Manly returned to winning form quickly, defeating South Sydney in their next match, before thrashing Newcastle, 32–10, and defeating Penrith, 12–8. A defeat to the Wests Tigers followed, in a home game that Manly decided to play at Gosford's Central Coast Stadium. Manly responded to the defeat to the Tigers with another winning streak, beating the Sydney Roosters, the Parramatta Eels and the Canterbury Bulldogs in successive weeks. The cost to Manly was an injury to their co-captain Jason King in the Roosters match. He would miss the remainder of the season with a torn pectoral muscle.

King's loss was only the start of things to come for Manly. On Friday, 26 August 2011, Manly hosted the Melbourne Storm at Brookvale Oval for the penultimate match of the regular season. Melbourne was then on top of the NRL ladder and looking to secure the minor premiership; Manly was in second place. The two clubs had been rivals since they played 2007 and 2008 grand finals, winning one apiece. The one thing that united the club's fans was a mutual dislike for the NRL's chief executive David Gallop. Gallop had decided to strip Melbourne of its 2007 and 2009 premierships for salary cap breaches. He had also angered Manly by suspending Brett Stewart in 2009 for his behaviour at an official event; Stewart was charged with, and subsequently acquitted of, committing rape after the event. Gallop decided to attend the Friday night match, in front of a packed Brookvale Oval crowd of 20,059, leaving Manly to consider hiring security guards to protect him. The match that ensued earned the name "The Battle of Brookvale". In the first half of the match, a skirmish broke out between Manly's Darcy Lussick and Melbourne's Ryan Hinchcliffe. A number of players joined the brawl, including Manly's Glenn Stewart and Melbourne's Adam Blair, who the referee decided to send to the sin bin. As Stewart and Blair left the field for their ten minutes on the sidelines, a fight broke out between them. A series of Manly and Melbourne players ran from the field and the sideline benches to join the fight, giving rise to a large brawl in front of Brookvale Oval's main stand. Stewart and Blair were both sent off for the remainder of the match, which Manly went on to win. Manly suffered four suspensions arising from the match: Stewart and Lussick were suspended for three weeks each as the brawls' principal protagonists, while Foran and Stewart's brother Brett received lesser suspensions for their parts in the melee. Each club was fined $50,000 by the NRL. Gallop said after the match: "The sight of so many players from both teams fighting, of people running in and leaving the bench area, was an horrendous look for the game." The fallout from the match also claimed the scalp of Manly's long-serving media manager and former player Peter Peters, who was stood down and then sacked for making a sexist comment to a female reporter when leaving an NRL judiciary hearing for Glenn Stewart. Meanwhile, Manly winger David Williams suffered a neck injury in the match that would end his season.

Manly thus fielded a depleted side for their final regular season match against the Brisbane Broncos at Suncorp Stadium. Even though the Broncos won 18–10, Manly had already secured second place on the NRL ladder behind Melbourne; the Broncos finished third.

==== Ladder ====
2011 NRL Telstra Premiership
Pos.	Team	Pld	W	D	L	B	PF	PA	PD	Pts
1	Melbourne Storm	24	19	0	5	2	521	308	213	42
2	Manly Warringah Sea Eagles (P)	24	18	0	6	2	539	331	208	40
3	Brisbane Broncos	24	18	0	6	2	511	372	139	40
4	Wests Tigers	24	15	0	9	2	519	430	89	34
5	St. George Illawarra Dragons	24	14	1	9	2	483	341	142	33
6	New Zealand Warriors	24	14	0	10	2	504	393	111	32
7	North Queensland Cowboys	24	14	0	10	2	532	480	52	32
8	Newcastle Knights	24	12	0	12	2	478	443	35	28
9	Canterbury-Bankstown Bulldogs	24	12	0	12	2	449	489	-40	28
10	South Sydney Rabbitohs	24	11	0	13	2	531	562	-31	26
11	Sydney Roosters	24	10	0	14	2	417	500	-83	24
12	Penrith Panthers	24	9	0	15	2	430	517	-87	22
13	Cronulla-Sutherland Sharks	24	7	0	17	2	428	557	-129	18
14	Parramatta Eels	24	6	1	17	2	385	538	-153	17
15	Canberra Raiders	24	6	0	18	2	423	623	-200	16
16	Gold Coast Titans	24	6	0	18	2	363	629	-266	16

=== Finals series ===
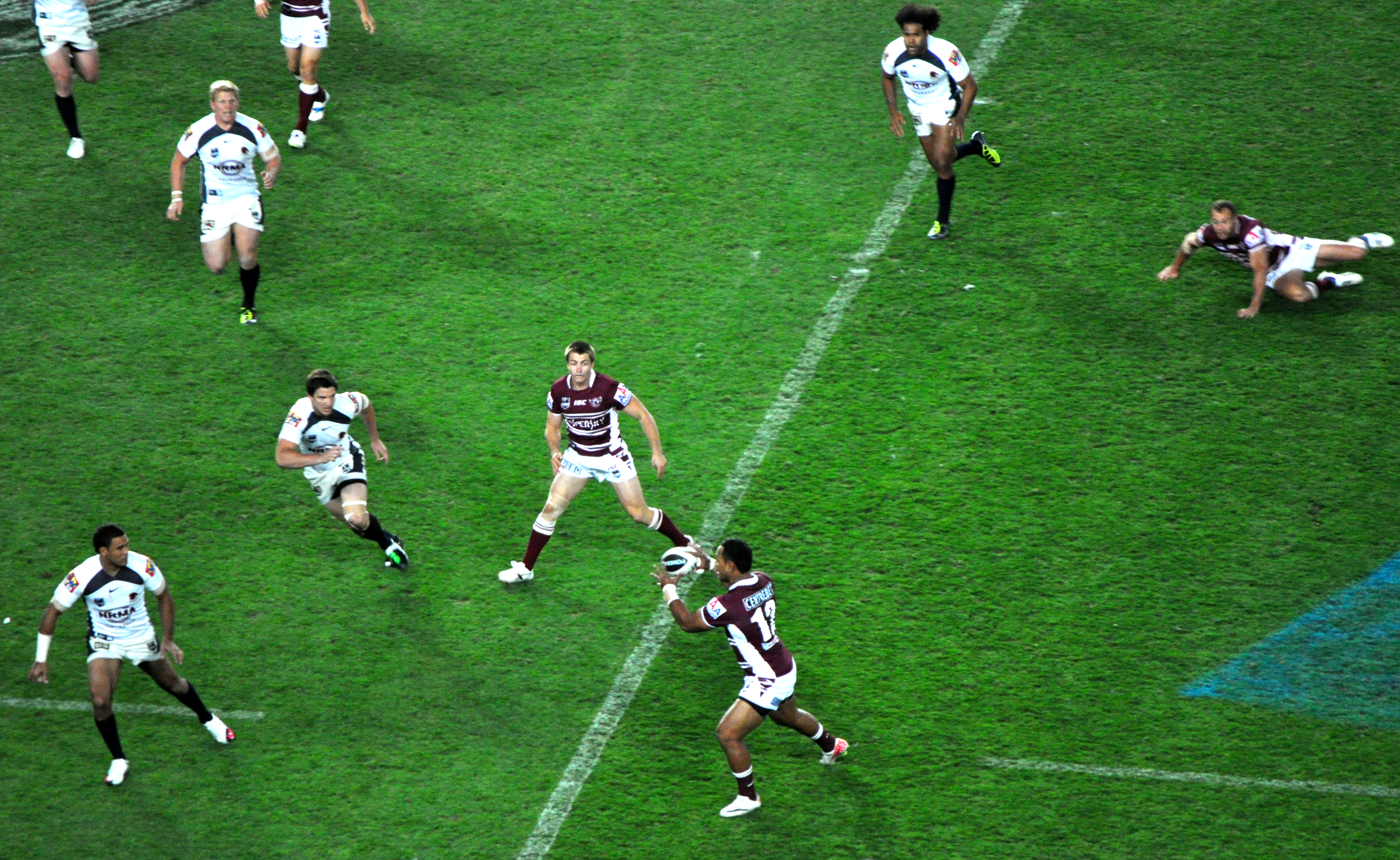
Manly forward Tony Williams catches the ball in the preliminary final against the Brisbane Broncos.

Finishing second on the ladder gave Manly the comfort of knowing that they would not be eliminated from the finals series if they lost their opening match, and that if they won, they would move straight into the series' third and final week. Their opponents in the qualifying final were the North Queensland Cowboys. Manly were disappointed that their right to a "home final" could not be exercised at Brookvale Oval, where they had been undefeated during the regular season. The NRL forced Manly to play the match at the Sydney Football Stadium, in front of a crowd of only 13,972. Nonetheless, despite trailing the Cowboys at half-time, Manly scored 42 points in the second half to win 42–8.

Defeating the Cowboys put Manly one win away from the NRL grand final. Their opponents in the preliminary final would be the Brisbane Broncos, who had defeated them three weeks earlier. Much of the focus in the week leading up to the match was on whether Darren Lockyer, Brisbane's retiring captain and 355-game veteran, would play after fracturing his cheekbone in the second week of the finals. Lockyer was initially named in the Brisbane team, but withdrew from the match late in the week. Lockyer's withdrawal made Manly the firm favourites, and they won 26–14.

=== Grand final ===
Sunday 2 October
5:00PM AEST

Manly-Warringah Sea Eagles	24 – 10	New Zealand Warriors
Tries: Brett Stewart; Daly Cherry-Evans; Glenn Stewart; Jamie Lyon; Goals: Jamie Lyon (3/3); Michael Robertson (1/1)		Tries: Manu Vatuvei; Elijah Taylor Goals: James Maloney (1/3)

ANZ Stadium, Sydney
Attendance: 81,988
Referee: Matt Cecchin, Tony Archer
Player of the Match: Glenn Stewart

Manly-Warringah	New Zealand

FB	1	Brett Stewart
LW	2	Michael Robertson
RC	3	Jamie Lyon (c)
LC	4	Steve Matai
RW	5	William Hopoate
FE	6	Kieran Foran
HB	7	Daly Cherry-Evans
PR	8	Joe Galuvao
HK	9	Matt Ballin
PR	10	Brent Kite
SR	11	Anthony Watmough
SR	12	Tony Williams
LK	13	Glenn Stewart
Substitutions:
IC	14	Shane Rodney
IC	15	Jamie Buhrer
IC	16	Vic Mauro
IC	17	George Rose
Coach:
(Australia) Des Hasler

FB	1	Kevin Locke
RW	2	Bill Tupou
RC	3	Lewis Brown
LC	4	Krisnan Inu
LW	5	Manu Vatuvei
FE	6	James Maloney
HB	7	Shaun Johnson
PR	8	Russell Packer
HK	9	Lance Hohaia
PR	10	Jacob Lillyman
SR	11	Elijah Taylor
SR	12	Simon Mannering (c)
LK	13	Micheal Luck
Substitutions:
IC	14	Sam Rapira
IC	15	Aaron Heremaia
IC	16	Feleti Mateo
IC	17	Ben Matulino
Coach:
(Australia) Ivan Cleary

Manly's opponents for the grand final, held at Stadium Australia on 2 October, were the New Zealand Warriors, who had finished sixth on the NRL ladder. The Warriors had pulled off a major upset when they defeated the minor premiers Melbourne Storm 20–12 in the second qualifying final in Melbourne, ruining the chances of a "Battle of Brookvale" grand final re-match. The Warriors were playing in their second first-grade grand final; it was Manly's 18th. Manly would also become the first club to play in grand finals in seven consecutive decades. Reflecting on this record, rugby league historian David Middleton said leading up to the match: "No other club has done what they have, it's a unique achievement."

Manly fielded a near full strength team for the grand final. Ten of its 17-man squad had previous grand final experience. Glenn Stewart returned from his "Battle of Brookvale" suspension, while 2008 premiership winners Jason King and David Williams were the only players missing through injury. While the grand final was held in Sydney, Manly received little support from Sydneysiders other than their own fans. Reflecting what the Irish Times observed from abroad was a long-standing "inherent hatred" for Manly, many Australians supported the foreign Warriors to win the match.

The match was played in front of 81,988 spectators and, for the third year in a row, in the rain. After a tight opening 30 minutes, the Warriors led 2–0 thanks to a James Maloney penalty goal. However, Manly broke clear with two tries before half-time, the first to fullback Brett Stewart and the second to rookie halfback Daly Cherry-Evans, one play after an audacious kick from forward Glenn Stewart in his own half allowed winger Michael Robertson to break free down the right flank. Manly stretched its lead to 16 points after half-time following a try to Glenn Stewart, set up by a blind flick pass from William Hopoate as he was pushed out of play. The Warriors scored two unconverted tries in the final fifteen minutes by Manu Vatuvei and Elijah Taylor to narrow the deficit to eight points; however, Manly held onto its lead and celebrated victory with a try to captain Jamie Lyon in the final minute of play. The final score was 24–10. Glenn Stewart was awarded the Clive Churchill Medal as the player of the match.

=== Season statistics ===
Player	Appearances: Starting (interchange)	Tries	Goals	Field Goals	Points
Matt Ballin	27	3	0	0	12
Daly Cherry-Evans	27	7	25/40	3	81
Kieran Foran	26	8	0	0	32
Jamie Lyon	25	9	59/80	0	154
Anthony Watmough	24	5	0	0	20
Glenn Stewart	23	4	0	0	16
Brent Kite	23	0	0	0	0
Steve Matai	22	9	0	0	36
Michael Robertson	21	11	2/2	0	48
Brett Stewart	20	15	0	0	60
William Hopoate	19	14	0	0	56
Joe Galuvao	16 (11)	1	0	0	4
Jason King	16	0	0	0	0
Michael Oldfield	12	6	0	0	24
David Williams	12	8	0	0	32
George Rose	10 (16)	3	0	0	12
Tony Williams	8 (12)	6	0	0	24
Shane Rodney	8 (4)	0	0	0	0
Jamie Buhrer	7 (19)	4	0	0	16
Vic Mauro	4 (17)	0	0	0	0
Dean Whare	1	0	0	0	0
Tim Robinson	0 (13)	0	0	0	0
Darcy Lussick	0 (8)	0	0	0	0
Terence Seu Seu	0 (5)	0	0	0	0
Daniel Harrison	0 (3)	0	1	0	4

Source: Rugby League Project

== Representative Players ==
=== International ===
- Australia – Daly Cherry-Evans, Anthony Watmough, Tony Williams
- New Zealand – Kieran Foran

=== State ===
- New South Wales – Jason King, William Hopoate, Glenn Stewart, Anthony Watmough

=== City vs Country ===
- City Origin – William Hopoate
- Country Origin – Glenn Stewart (c)

== Awards and honours ==
Two Manly players were recognised in the official Dally M Awards for the NRL season. Daly Cherry-Evans was named the best rookie in the league, for a season in which he started at half-back in every single match. Steve Menzies was the last Manly player to have won the award, in 1994. Jamie Lyon was named in the NRL's team of the season, as the league's best centre.

On 3 November 2011 the annual RLIF Awards dinner was held at the Tower of London. Manly coach Des Hasler was named the world's top coach of the year, while Cherry-Evans and Lyon added to their Dally M awards by being named the best players in their positions. In the Golden Boot Awards decided by Rugby League World, Lyon and Anthony Watmough were named in the international team of the season.

At Manly's club awards, Glenn Stewart was named the best and fairest player for the season, Steve Matai the "players' player", and Daly Cherry-Evans the best rookie. Five Manly players were selected in the Australian Kangaroos squad for the post-season Four Nations: Glenn and Brett Stewart, Anthony Watmough, Tony Williams and Cherry-Evans, although the Stewart brothers subsequently withdrew from the squad before the tournament.

== Post-season turmoil and sacking of Des Hasler ==
Even as Manly was still celebrating its grand final victory, it was struggling to hold on to some of its key people. Prior to the finals series, long serving winger Michael Robertson had already announced his intention to leave the club to play for the London Broncos in the Super League, fulfilling an ambition to play in England. Barely days after the grand final, the other grand final winger, star rookie Will Hopoate, signed to play for the Parramatta Eels upon his return from a two-year Mormon mission.

Hopoate's loss was shortly followed by that of the club's head coach, Des Hasler. Hasler had won two premierships with the club in a long playing career (1987 and 1996), and two as the club's coach (2008 and 2011). Speculation about Hasler's future had been building in the weeks leading up to the grand final, but he appeared to quash the rumours by announcing after the match that he would be at Manly for 2012, the last year of his contract. However, within days, Hasler signed an agreement to coach the Canterbury-Bankstown Bulldogs from 2013. He agreed with Manly's board to remain as Manly's head coach for 2012, while the club would appoint Hasler's assistant Geoff Toovey from 2013.

Within the following weeks, a series of Manly staff followed Hasler in signing for the Bulldogs, including the club's recruitment manager and Hasler's 1987 premiership winning teammate Noel Cleal, who cited "factional infighting" as his reason for leaving. In early November, the Manly board suspended Hasler from his duties, alleging that he had been trying to entice fellow Manly staff to defect to the Bulldogs, which the board considered amounted to "serious breaches" of Hasler's employment contract (rumours also surfaced that he had tried to entice players Kieran Foran, Brett Stewart and Tony Williams to join him at Belmore). Ultimately, on 11 November, less than six weeks after winning the premiership, the board terminated Hasler's contract and immediately appointed Toovey as his successor. Hasler initially threatened to sue Manly for the termination of his contract; Manly's chairman Scott Penn claimed in response that the club had "verbal and email evidence that he was involved in coercing staff to leave". The 82-year-old former Manly player, coach and club secretary Ken Arthurson said: "To do what [Hasler] has done is beyond the pale". The club's 1978 premiership-winning captain Max Krilich called Hasler a "mercenary", while another former premiership-winning captain Fred Jones called his defection to Canterbury "disgraceful". After reaching an agreement to commence as the Bulldogs' head coach from 2012, a year earlier than first agreed, Hasler dropped his threat of legal action against Manly.
