= 2011 Cronulla-Sutherland Sharks season =

- NRL rank: 12th(as of RND 23)
- 2011 record: Wins: 7; losses: 17

Team information
- CEO: Richard Fisk
- Coach: Shane Flanagan
- Captain: Paul Gallen
- Stadium: Toyota Stadium
- Avg. attendance: 10,551

Top scorers
- Tries: Ben Pomeroy (9)
- Goals: John Williams(26)
- Points: John Williams (76)
← 2010	2012 →

The 2011 Cronulla-Sutherland Sharks season is the 45th in the club's history. They are competing in the NRL's 2011 Telstra Premiership.

== Ladder ==
2011 NRL Telstra Premiership
Pos.	Team	Pld	W	D	L	B	PF	PA	PD	Pts
1	Melbourne Storm	24	19	0	5	2	521	308	213	42
2	Manly Warringah Sea Eagles (P)	24	18	0	6	2	539	331	208	40
3	Brisbane Broncos	24	18	0	6	2	511	372	139	40
4	Wests Tigers	24	15	0	9	2	519	430	89	34
5	St. George Illawarra Dragons	24	14	1	9	2	483	341	142	33
6	New Zealand Warriors	24	14	0	10	2	504	393	111	32
7	North Queensland Cowboys	24	14	0	10	2	532	480	52	32
8	Newcastle Knights	24	12	0	12	2	478	443	35	28
9	Canterbury-Bankstown Bulldogs	24	12	0	12	2	449	489	-40	28
10	South Sydney Rabbitohs	24	11	0	13	2	531	562	-31	26
11	Sydney Roosters	24	10	0	14	2	417	500	-83	24
12	Penrith Panthers	24	9	0	15	2	430	517	-87	22
13	Cronulla-Sutherland Sharks	24	7	0	17	2	428	557	-129	18
14	Parramatta Eels	24	6	1	17	2	385	538	-153	17
15	Canberra Raiders	24	6	0	18	2	423	623	-200	16
16	Gold Coast Titans	24	6	0	18	2	363	629	-266	16

== Results ==
- Round 1 – Raiders vs Sharks (Loss 40 – 12)

Tries – Luke Douglas, Nathan Gardner

- Round 2 – Sharks vs Dragons (Win 16 – 10)

Tries – Ben Pomeroy(2), Anthony Tupou

- Round 3 – Panthers vs Sharks (Win 12 – 44)

Tries – Albert Kelly(2), Paul Gallen, Nathan Gardner, Jeremy Smith, Jon Mannah, Colin Best

- Round 4 – Sharks vs Warriors (Loss 18 – 26)

Tries – Jeremy Smith, Wade Graham, John Williams

- Round 5 – Sharks vs Sea Eagles (Loss 13 – 19)

Tries – Matthew Wright, Stuart Flanagan

- Round 6 – Knights vs Sharks (Loss 24 – 20)

Tries – Nathan Gardner(2), John Williams, Ben Pomeroy

- Round 7 – Sharks vs Cowboys (Loss 12 – 30)

Tries – Luke Douglas, Paul Gallen

- Round 8 – Rabbitohs vs Sharks (Loss 31 – 12)

Tries – Paul Aiton, Wade Graham

- Round 9 – BYE

- Round 10 – Sharks vs Roosters (Win 18 – 4)

Tries – Ben Pomeroy(2), Paul Gallen, Stewart Mills

- Round 11 – Eels vs Sharks (Loss 40 – 6)

Tries – Taulima Tautai

- Round 12 – Storm vs Sharks (Loss 14 – 8)

Tries – Isaac Gordon

- Round 13 – Sharks vs Broncos (Loss 16 – 34)

Tries – Jayson Bukuya, Jon Mannah, Colin Best

- Round 14 – BYE
- Round 15 – Bulldogs vs Sharks (Win 10 – 26)

Tries – Nathan Gardner, Ben Pomeroy, Paul Gallen, Wade Graham

- Round 16 – Titans vs Sharks (Win 12 – 36)

Tries – Nathan Gardner(2), Paul Gallen(2), Nathan Stapleton(2)

- Round 17 – Sharks vs Rabbitohs (Win 26 – 4)

Tries – Matthew Wright(2), Luke Douglas, Colin Best, Chad Townsend

- Round 18 – Sharks vs Raiders (Win 26 – 12)

Tries – Jayson Bukuya, Wade Graham, Colin Best, Taulima Tautai, Ben Pomeroy

- Round 19 – Dragons vs Sharks (Loss 38 - 8)

Tries - Colin Best, Josh Cordoba

- Round 20 – Sharks vs Knights (Loss 0 - 18)

Tries - (Scoreless)

- Round 21 – Broncos vs Sharks (Loss 46 - 16)

Tries - Chad Townsend, Matthew Wright, Jeremy Smith

- Round 22 – Sharks vs Titans (Loss 16 - 20)

Tries - John Morris, Ben Pomeroy, Ricky Leutele

- Round 23 – Sharks vs Bulldogs (Loss 12 - 19)

Tries - Nathan Gardner, Sam Tagataese

- Round 24 – Roosters vs Sharks (Loss 36 - 25)

Tries - John Williams (2), Wade Graham, Ben Pomeroy

- Round 25 – Cowboys vs Sharks (Loss 28 - 20)

Tries - Wade Graham, Isaac Gordon, Paul Aiton

- Round 26 – Sharks vs Tigers (Loss 22 - 30)

Tries - John Williams (2), Jeremy Smith, Stewart Mills

== Team Stats ==
- Most Points – John Williams (76)
- Most Tries – Ben Pomeroy (9)
- Most Conversions – John Williams (26)
- Most Penalty Goals – Chad Townsend, John Williams (4)
- Most Field Goals – Wade Graham (2)
- Most Try Assists – Paul Gallen (7)
- Most Line Breaks – Nathan Gardner, Wade Graham (10)
- Most All Runs – Paul Gallen (414)
- Most Offloads – Anthony Tupou (57)
- Most Kicks in Play – Wade Graham (154)
