= Mark Minichiello =

Former Italy international rugby league footballer

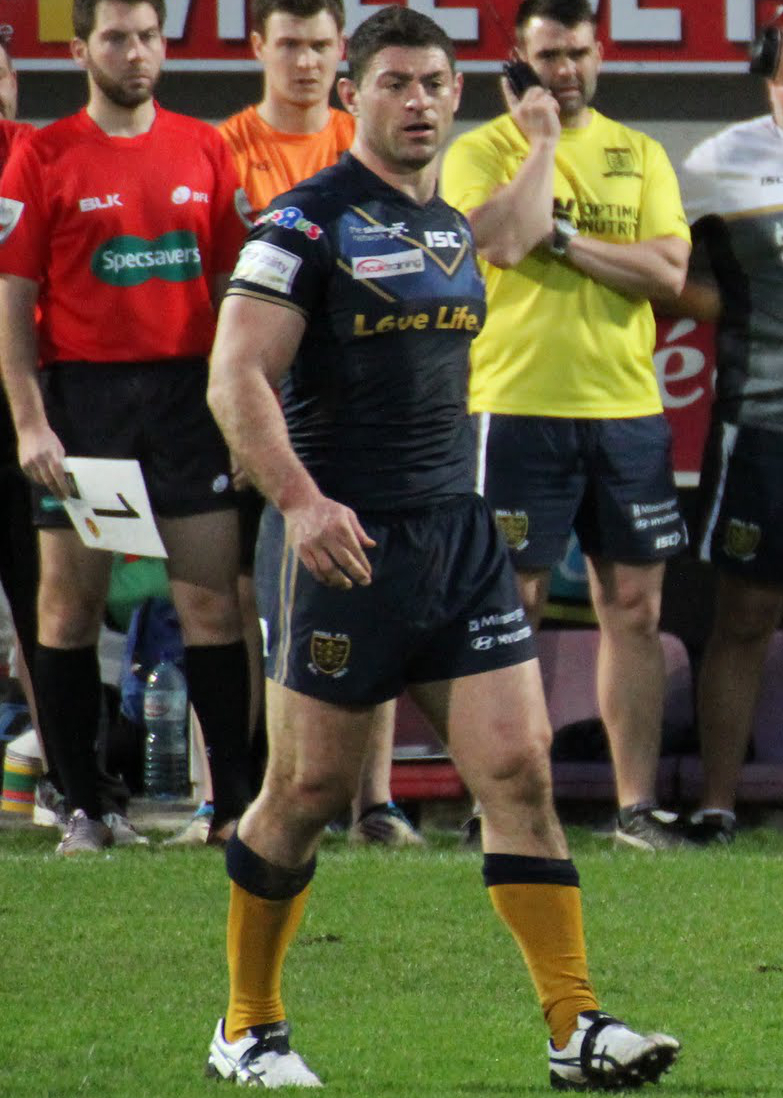

Personal information
- Full name: Markus Antonio Minichiello
- Born: 30 January 1982 (age 44) Sydney, New South Wales, Australia

Playing information
- Height: 180 cm (5 ft 11 in)
- Weight: 100 kg (15 st 10 lb)
- Position: Second-row
Club
Years	Team	Pld	T	G	FG	P
2002	Sydney Roosters	1	0	0	0	0
2003–06	South Sydney	85	16	0	0	64
2007–14	Gold Coast Titans	173	32	0	0	128
2015–19	Hull F.C.	138	21	0	0	84
	Total	397	69	0	0	276
Representative
Years	Team	Pld	T	G	FG	P
2007–11	NSW City	5	2	0	0	8
2013–17	Italy	6	1	0	0	4
- Relatives: Anthony Minichiello (brother)

Markus Antonio "Mark" Minichiello (born 30 January 1982) is a former Italy international rugby league footballer who played as a second-row forward.

He previously played for the Sydney Roosters, South Sydney Rabbitohs and the Gold Coast Titans in the NRL, and Hull F.C. in the Super League. He represented NSW City between 2007 and 2011.

== Background ==
Minichiello was born in Sydney, New South Wales, Australia. He is the younger brother of former Golden Boot winner Anthony Minichiello.

== Early career ==
While attending Westfields Sports High, Minichiello played for the Australian Schoolboys team in 1999.

== Club career ==
=== Sydney Roosters ===
Minichiello started his career with Sydney Roosters in 2002. He only played one game for the club before switching to the arch rivals South Sydney Rabbitohs.

=== South Sydney Rabbitohs ===
He played 85 games with the club during a tough time in their history as South Sydney finished last in 2003, 2004 and 2006. He signed for Gold Coast Titans in 2007 which was the club's inaugural season.

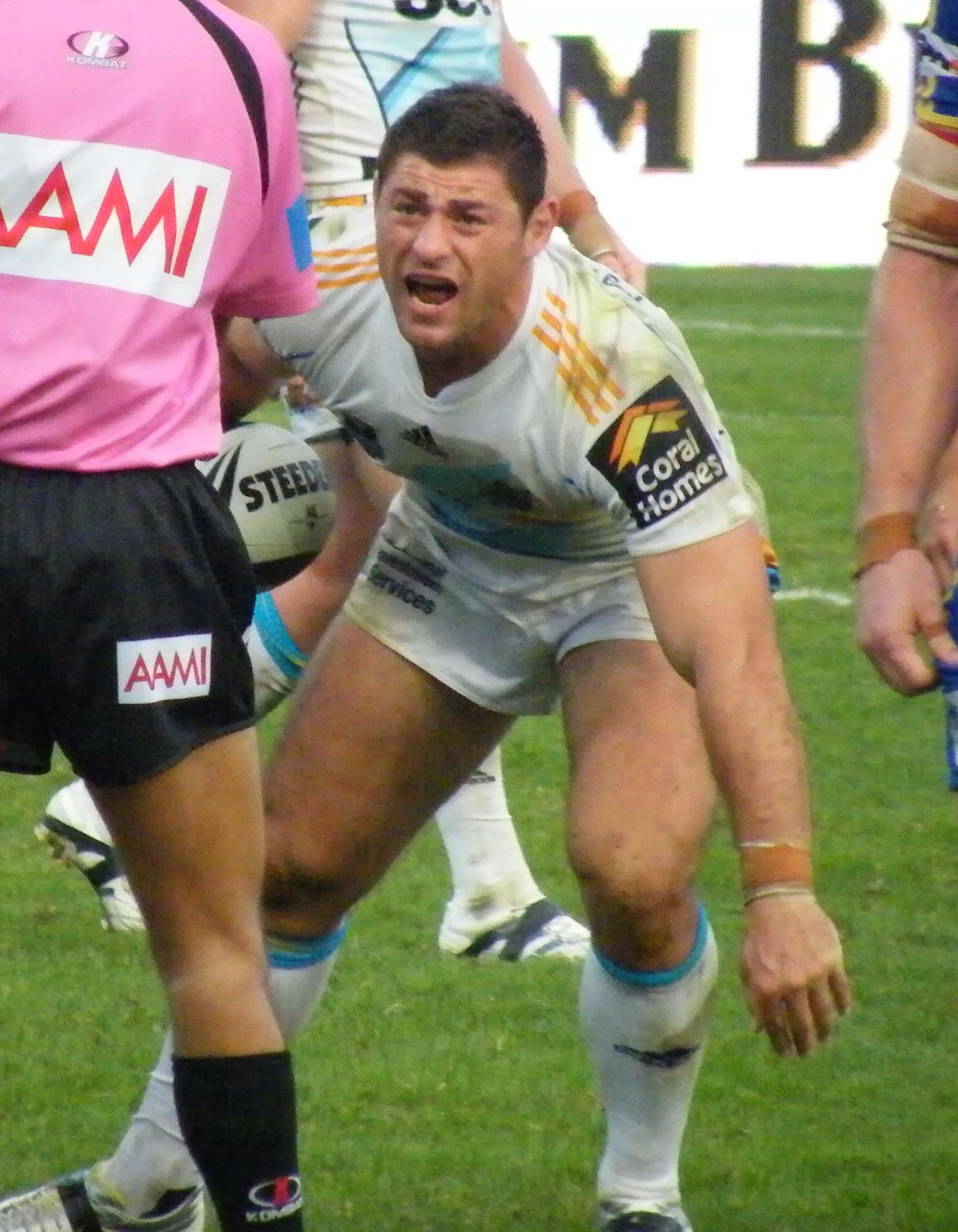
Minichiello playing for the Gold Coast Titans

=== Gold Coast Titans ===
He was an important member for the Gold Coast club since he joined in 2007. In the 2009 NRL season, he was part of the Gold Coast side which qualified for the finals for the first time in their history. The following year, he played in the club's preliminary final defeat against the Sydney Roosters at Suncorp Stadium.

In 2011, he played 23 games as the Gold Coast finished last on the table and claimed the wooden spoon. In total, he played 173 first grade games for the club between 2007 and 2014.

=== Hull FC ===
On 15 August 2014, Minichiello announced that he was joining Hull F.C. in the Super League on a two-year deal starting in 2015. Minichiello enjoyed a successful season with Hull F.C. in 2015, winning the Supporters' Player of the Year award & the club's Player of the Year award with Liam Watts.

On 27 January 2016, Minichiello extended his contract with Hull until the end of the 2017 season.

He played in the 2016 Challenge Cup Final victory over the Warrington Wolves at Wembley Stadium.

He played in the 2017 Challenge Cup Final victory over the Wigan Warriors at Wembley Stadium.

== Representative career ==
=== City ===
He was selected for City in the City vs Country match on 8 May 2009.

=== Italy ===
Minichiello played for Italy at the 2013 and 2017 Rugby League World Cup.

== Personal life ==
In 2017 Mark launched his own functional training and rehabilitation equipment company Xer360.
