= 2011 NRL season =

Rugby league competition

2011 National Rugby League
- Duration: 11 March – 2 October 2011
- Teams: 16
- Premiers: Manly Warringah Sea Eagles (8th title)
- Minor premiers: Melbourne Storm (1st title)
- Matches played: 201
- Average attendance: 17,235
- Total attendance: 3,464,207
- Top points scorer: Benji Marshall (211)
- Wooden spoon: Gold Coast Titans (1st spoon)
- Dally M Medal: Billy Slater
- Top try-scorer(s): Nathan Merritt (23); Ben Barba (23)

The 2011 NRL season was the 104th season of professional rugby league football club competition in Australia, and the fourteenth and last run by the National Rugby League's partnership committee of the Australian Rugby League and News Ltd. The NRL's main championship, called the 2011 Telstra Premiership due to sponsorship from Telstra, was contested by sixteen teams for the fifth consecutive year. Alongside was the fourth season of the Toyota Cup taking place.

The season's Premiership title was awarded to the Manly Warringah Sea Eagles who took out their 8th title, only three years after their previous title, defeating the New Zealand Warriors in the grand final.

== Season summary ==
The 2011 competition draw was announced on Thursday, 7 October 2010, with the season's first match between NRL teams to be played on Friday, 11 March. The first round of the premiership season became the highest attended round in NRL history, with 201,212 fans attending. However, the first NRL match of the year was the second annual NRL All Stars vs Indigenous All Stars game played at Skilled Park on the Gold Coast on 12 February. The annual ANZAC Test was also held at Skilled Park, on 6 May, with City vs Country Origin held on the same night at the Lavington Sports Ground in Albury. The Test match was to have been held at Christchurch in New Zealand, but was moved due to the destruction wrought on that city by the earthquake in February 2011. Byes began on 6 May, being the day of those representative matches, and continued throughout the 2011 State of Origin series, covering in total rounds 9 to 18. Themed rounds included the Heritage Round (round 5), Women in League Round (round 16), and Rivalry Round (round 19).

The regular 26 round season finished with the Melbourne Storm winning the J. J. Giltinan Shield for being the minor premiers. However the grand final match-up ended up between the second placed Manly Warringah Sea Eagles and the sixth placed New Zealand Warriors in which the Sea Eagles sought victory and claimed their 8th premiership title.

The coveted Dally M Medal award for player of the year in 2011 was awarded to Melbourne Storm fullback Billy Slater, who becomes the second Storm player to be given the award. (see 2011 Dally M Awards for full award listing)

=== Records set in 2011 ===
- Canberra Raiders equalled their longest losing streak with 8-matches (Round 2 - Round 9).
- Brisbane Broncos round-26 match was the biggest ever regular home game crowd for the Broncos at Suncorp Stadium with 50,859.
- South Sydney Rabbitohs winger Nathan Merritt equaled the club record for the most tries in a match with 5-tries against the Parramatta Eels in Round 22.
- Manly Warringah Sea Eagles set the record for the most points scored in a half of finals football when they scored 42 unanswered points against the North Queensland Cowboys.
- Sea Eagles halves Kieran Foran (21) and Daly Cherry-Evans (22) became the youngest halves pairing to win a grand final since Brett Kenny (20) and Peter Sterling (21) in 1981

== Teams ==
The number of teams in the NRL remained unchanged for the fourth consecutive season, with sixteen participating in the regular season: ten from New South Wales, three from Queensland and one from each of Victoria, the Australian Capital Territory and New Zealand. Of the ten from New South Wales, eight are from Sydney's metropolitan area, with St. George-Illawarra being a Sydney and Wollongong joint venture. Just two foundation clubs from New South Wales Rugby League season 1908 played in the competition: the Sydney Roosters (formerly known as Eastern Suburbs) and the South Sydney Rabbitohs.

Brisbane Broncos; 24th season Ground: Suncorp Stadium; Coach: Anthony Griffin; Captain: Darren Lockyer	Canterbury-Bankstown Bulldogs; 77th season Ground: ANZ Stadium; Coach: Kevin Moore→Jim Dymock; Captain: Andrew Ryan	Canberra Raiders; 30th season Ground: Canberra Stadium; Coach: David Furner; Captain: Alan Tongue	Cronulla-Sutherland Sharks; 45th season Ground: Toyota Stadium; Coach: Shane Flanagan; Captain: Paul Gallen
Gold Coast Titans; 5th season Ground: Skilled Park; Coach: John Cartwright; Captain: Scott Prince	Manly Warringah Sea Eagles; 62nd season Ground: Brookvale Oval; Coach: Des Hasler; Captain: Jamie Lyon & Jason King	Melbourne Storm; 14th season Ground: AAMI Park; Coach: Craig Bellamy; Captain: Cameron Smith	Newcastle Knights; 24th season Ground: Ausgrid Stadium; Coach: Rick Stone; Captain: Kurt Gidley
2009 New Zealand Warriors; 17th season Ground: Mt. Smart Stadium; Coach: Ivan Cleary; Captain: Simon Mannering	North Queensland Cowboys; 17th season Ground: Dairy Farmers Stadium; Coach: Neil Henry; Captain: Johnathan Thurston & Matt Scott	Parramatta Eels; 65th season Ground: Parramatta Stadium; Coach: Stephen Kearney; Captain: Nathan Hindmarsh	Penrith Panthers; 45th season Ground: Centrebet Stadium; Coach: Matthew Elliott→Steve Georgallis; Captain: Petero Civoniceva
South Sydney Rabbitohs; 102nd season Ground: ANZ Stadium; Coach: John Lang; Captains: Roy Asotasi & Michael Crocker	Sydney Roosters; 104th season Ground: Sydney Football Stadium; Coach: Brian Smith; Captain: Braith Anasta	St George Illawarra Dragons; 13th season Ground: Jubilee Oval & WIN Stadium; Coach: Wayne Bennett; Captain: Ben Hornby	Wests Tigers; 12th season Grounds: Campbelltown Stadium & Leichhardt Oval; Coach: Tim Sheens; Captain: Robbie Farah

== Regular season ==
Team	1	2	3	4	5	6	7	8	9	10	11	12	13	14	15	16	17	18	19	20	21	22	23	24	25	26	F1	F2	F3	GF
Brisbane Broncos	**NQL** **−2**	CAN +16	GCT +6	**PEN** **+8**	**NEW** **+11**	SYD +18	WTI +13	**CBY** **+8**	**MEL** **−7**	PEN −23	X	**MAN** **−24**	CRO +18	**CAN** **+1***	**SGI** **+7**	SOU −4	PAR +4	X	**GCT** **+20**	MEL −20	**CRO** **+30**	**NZL** **+1**	NQL +18	NEW +20	**SOU** **+12**	**MAN** **+8**	**NZL** **+30**	**SGI** **+1***	MAN −12	
Canberra Raiders	**CRO** **+28**	**BRI** **−16**	WTI −10	**GCT** **−1***	PEN −26	NQL −8	**NEW** **−10**	**WTI** **−37**	MAN −20	MEL +8	**CBY** **+8**	X	**NQL** **−16**	BRI −1*	X	**PAR** **+13**	SYD +26	CRO −14	**MEL** **−26**	**SGI** **+5**	NZL −19	NEW −32	**SOU** **−29**	GCT −8	**PEN** **−1**	CBY −14				
Canterbury-Bankstown Bulldogs	**WTI** **+10**	**SOU** **+9**	**SYD** **+4**	MEL −14	SGI −19	**PAR** **+20**	**SOU** **+12**	BRI −8	X	**SGI** **−5**	CAN −8	GCT +22	**MAN** **−34**	X	**CRO** **−16**	WTI +10	PEN −14	**MEL** **−10**	NZL −24	**PAR** **+1***	SYD −4	**NQL** **+8**	CRO +7	MAN −11	**NEW** **+10**	**CAN** **+14**				
Cronulla-Sutherland Sharks	CAN −28	**SGI** **+6**	PEN +32	NZL −8	**MAN** **−6**	NEW −4	**NQL** **−18**	SOU −19	X	**SYD** **+14**	PAR −34	MEL −6	**BRI** **−18**	X	CBY +16	GCT +24	**SOU** **+22**	**CAN** **+14**	SGI −30	**NEW** **−18**	BRI −30	**GCT** **−4**	**CBY** **−7**	SYD −11	NQL −8	**WTI** **−8**				
Gold Coast Titans	**SGI** **−9**	MEL −28	**BRI** **−6**	CAN +1*	NQL −10	**WTI** **+6**	PAR −4	**SYD** **+11**	**NZL** **−20**	**MAN** **−4**	X	**CBY** **−22**	**PEN** **−13**	SGI +14	SOU −23	**CRO** **−24**	X	NZL −16	BRI −20	**NQL** **−8**	NEW −30	CRO +4	**MEL** **−24**	**CAN** **+8**	WTI −29	**PAR** **−20**				
Manly Warringah Sea Eagles	MEL −12	SYD +11	**NEW** **+14**	SOU −2	CRO +6	**NZL** **+10**	**PEN** **+6**	NQL −2	**CAN** **+20**	GCT +4	X	BRI +24	CBY +34	**NQL** **+20**	**PAR** **+4**	SGI −18	X	**SOU** **+14**	NEW +22	PEN +4	**WTI** **−2**	**SYD** **+28**	PAR +6	**CBY** **+11**	**MEL** **+14**	BRI −8	**NQL** **+34**	X	**BRI** **+12**	**NZL** **+14**
Melbourne Storm	**MAN** **+12**	**GCT** **+28**	NQL −28	**CBY** **+14**	**PAR** **+38**	PEN +15	**NZL** **−4**	**NEW** **+30**	BRI +7	**CAN** **−8**	X	**CRO** **+6**	SOU +10	**SYD** **+17**	WTI +8	NZL +8	X	CBY +10	CAN +26	**BRI** **+20**	PAR +4	**PEN** **+20**	GCT +24	**SGI** **+2**	MAN −14	SYD −32	**NEW** **+10**	X	**NZL** **−8**	
Newcastle Knights	PEN +34	NQL +12	MAN −14	**SGI** **−2**	BRI −11	**CRO** **+4**	CAN +10	MEL −30	X	**NZL** **−9**	SYD −2	**PAR** **+2**	WTI −1*	X	**PEN** **+4**	**SYD** **+8**	SGI +4	**NQL** **−10**	**MAN** **−22**	CRO +18	**GCT** **+30**	**CAN** **+32**	NZL −8	**BRI** **−20**	CBY −10	**SOU** **+16**	MEL −10			
New Zealand Warriors	**PAR** **−6**	WTI −8	**SGI** **−13**	**CRO** **+8**	**SYD** **+12**	MAN −10	MEL +4	**PEN** **+8**	GCT +20	NEW +9	**SOU** **+6**	X	SYD −7	**WTI** **−4**	NQL −20	**MEL** **−8**	X	**GCT** **+16**	**CBY** **+24**	SOU +32	**CAN** **+19**	BRI −1	**NEW** **+8**	PEN +14	SGI −4	**NQL** **+12**	BRI −30	WTI +2	MEL +8	MAN −14
North Queensland Cowboys	BRI +2	**NEW** **−12**	**MEL** **+28**	PAR −2	**GCT** **+10**	**CAN** **+8**	CRO +18	**MAN** **+2**	SGI −14	**PAR** **+14**	X	**SYD** **+14**	CAN +16	MAN −20	**NZL** **+20**	PEN −10	X	NEW +10	**WTI** **−20**	GCT +8	**PEN** **+12**	CBY −8	**BRI** **−18**	SOU −2*	**CRO** **+8**	NZL −12	MAN −34			
Parramatta Eels	NZL +6	**PEN** **−14**	SOU −14	**NQL** **+2**	MEL −38	CBY −20	**GCT** **+4**	SGI −30	X	NQL −14	**CRO** **+34**	NEW −2	**SGI**; **0***	X	MAN −4	CAN −13	**BRI** **−4**	**WTI** **+16**	PEN −1*	CBY −1*	**MEL** **−4**	SOU −50	**MAN** **−6**	WTI −19	**SYD** **−1***	GCT +20				
Penrith Panthers	**NEW** **−34**	PAR +14	**CRO** **−32**	BRI −8	**CAN** **+26**	**MEL** **−15**	MAN −6	NZL −8	X	**BRI** **+23**	WTI −2	**SOU** **+12**	GCT +13	X	NEW −4	**NQL** **+10**	**CBY** **+14**	SYD −8	**PAR** **+1***	**MAN** **−4**	NQL −12	MEL −20	**WTI** **−14**	**NZL** **−14**	CAN +1	SGI −20				
South Sydney Rabbitohs	SYD −11	CBY −9	**PAR** **+14**	**MAN** **+2**	WTI −24	**SGI** **−16**	CBY −12	**CRO** **+19**	X	**WTI** **+11**	NZL −6	PEN −12	**MEL** **−10**	X	**GCT** **+23**	**BRI** **+4**	CRO −22	MAN −14	**SYD** **+1***	**NZL** **−32**	SGI +10	**PAR** **+50**	CAN +29	**NQL** **+2***	BRI −12	NEW −16				
St. George Illawarra Dragons	GCT +9	CRO −6	NZL +13	NEW +2	**CBY** **+19**	SOU +16	SYD +14	**PAR** **+30**	**NQL** **+14**	CBY +5	X	**WTI** **+6**	PAR; 0*	**GCT** **−14**	BRI −7	**MAN** **+18**	**NEW** **−4**	X	**CRO** **+30**	CAN −5	**SOU** **−10**	WTI −2	**SYD** **−8**	MEL −2	**NZL** **+4**	**PEN** **+20**	WTI −9	BRI −1*		
Sydney Roosters	**SOU** **+11**	**MAN** **−11**	CBY −4	**WTI** **+18**	NZL −12	**BRI** **−18**	**SGI** **−14**	GCT −11	X	CRO −14	**NEW** **+2**	NQL −14	**NZL** **+7**	MEL −17	X	NEW −8	**CAN** **−26**	**PEN** **+8**	SOU −1*	WTI −7	**CBY** **+4**	MAN −28	SGI +8	**CRO** **+11**	PAR +1*	**MEL** **+32**				
Wests Tigers	CBY −10	**NZL** **+8**	**CAN** **+10**	SYD −18	**SOU** **+24**	GCT −6	**BRI** **−13**	CAN +37	X	SOU −11	**PEN** **+2**	SGI −6	**NEW** **+1***	NZL +4	**MEL** **−8**	**CBY** **−10**	X	PAR −16	NQL +20	**SYD** **+7**	MAN +2	**SGI** **+2**	PEN +14	**PAR** **+19**	**GCT** **+29**	CRO +8	**SGI** **+9**	**NZL** **−2**		
Team	1	2	3	4	5	6	7	8	9	10	11	12	13	14	15	16	17	18	19	20	21	22	23	24	25	26	F1	F2	F3	GF

Bold – Home game
X – Bye
* – Golden point game
Opponent for round listed above margin

== Ladder ==
2011 NRL Telstra Premiership
Pos.	Team	Pld	W	D	L	B	PF	PA	PD	Pts
1	Melbourne Storm	24	19	0	5	2	521	308	213	42
2	Manly Warringah Sea Eagles (P)	24	18	0	6	2	539	331	208	40
3	Brisbane Broncos	24	18	0	6	2	511	372	139	40
4	Wests Tigers	24	15	0	9	2	519	430	89	34
5	St. George Illawarra Dragons	24	14	1	9	2	483	341	142	33
6	New Zealand Warriors	24	14	0	10	2	504	393	111	32
7	North Queensland Cowboys	24	14	0	10	2	532	480	52	32
8	Newcastle Knights	24	12	0	12	2	478	443	35	28
9	Canterbury-Bankstown Bulldogs	24	12	0	12	2	449	489	-40	28
10	South Sydney Rabbitohs	24	11	0	13	2	531	562	-31	26
11	Sydney Roosters	24	10	0	14	2	417	500	-83	24
12	Penrith Panthers	24	9	0	15	2	430	517	-87	22
13	Cronulla-Sutherland Sharks	24	7	0	17	2	428	557	-129	18
14	Parramatta Eels	24	6	1	17	2	385	538	-153	17
15	Canberra Raiders	24	6	0	18	2	423	623	-200	16
16	Gold Coast Titans	24	6	0	18	2	363	629	-266	16

=== Ladder progression ===
- Numbers highlighted in green indicate that the team finished the round inside the top 8.
- Numbers highlighted in blue indicates the team finished first on the ladder in that round.
- Numbers highlighted in red indicates the team finished last place on the ladder in that round.
- Underlined numbers indicate that the team had a bye during that round.

	Team	1	2	3	4	5	6	7	8	9	10	11	12	13	14	15	16	17	18	19	20	21	22	23	24	25	26
1	Melbourne	2	4	4	6	8	10	10	12	14	14	16	18	20	22	24	26	28	30	32	34	36	38	40	42	42	42
2	Manly-Warringah	0	2	4	4	6	8	10	10	12	14	16	18	20	22	24	24	26	28	30	32	32	34	36	38	40	40
3	Brisbane	0	2	4	6	8	10	12	14	14	14	16	16	18	20	22	22	24	26	28	28	30	32	34	36	38	40
4	Wests	0	2	4	4	6	6	6	8	10	10	12	12	14	16	16	16	18	18	20	22	24	26	28	30	32	34
5	St George Illawarra	2	2	4	6	8	10	12	14	16	18	20	22	23	23	23	25	25	27	29	29	29	29	29	29	31	33
6	New Zealand	0	0	0	2	4	4	6	8	10	12	14	16	16	16	16	16	18	20	22	24	26	26	28	30	30	32
7	North Queensland	2	2	4	4	6	8	10	12	12	14	16	18	20	20	22	22	24	26	26	28	30	30	30	30	32	32
8	Newcastle	2	4	4	4	4	6	8	8	10	10	10	12	12	14	16	18	20	20	20	22	24	26	26	26	26	28
9	Canterbury-Bankstown	2	4	6	6	6	8	10	10	12	12	12	14	14	16	16	18	18	18	18	20	20	22	24	24	26	28
10	South Sydney	0	0	2	4	4	4	4	6	8	10	10	10	10	12	14	16	16	16	18	18	20	22	24	26	26	26
11	Sydney	2	2	2	4	4	4	4	4	6	6	8	8	10	10	12	12	12	14	14	14	16	16	18	20	22	24
12	Penrith	0	2	2	2	4	4	4	4	6	8	8	10	12	14	14	16	18	18	20	20	20	20	20	20	22	22
13	Cronulla-Sutherland	0	2	4	4	4	4	4	4	6	8	8	8	8	10	12	14	16	18	18	18	18	18	18	18	18	18
14	Parramatta	2	2	2	4	4	4	6	6	8	8	10	10	11	13	13	13	13	15	15	15	15	15	15	15	15	17
15	Canberra	2	2	2	2	2	2	2	2	2	4	6	8	8	8	10	12	14	14	14	16	16	16	16	16	16	16
16	Gold Coast	0	0	0	2	2	4	4	6	6	6	8	8	8	10	10	10	12	12	12	12	12	14	14	16	16	16

== Finals series ==
To decide the grand finalists from the top eight finishing teams, the NRL adopts the McIntyre final eight system. The 2011 finals series sees the Manly Warringah Sea Eagles, Wests Tigers, St George Illawarra Dragons and the New Zealand Warriors all return from last year. The Melbourne Storm and Brisbane Broncos both return after last year's absence whilst the North Queensland Cowboys and the Newcastle Knights appear in this year's finals for the first time since 2007 and 2009, respectively. This is currently the last finals series to feature the Wests Tigers.

Home	Score	Away	Match Information
Home	Score	Away	Date and Time (Local)	Venue	Referees	Crowd
QUALIFYING FINALS
Wests Tigers	21 – 12	St. George Illawarra Dragons	9 September 2011, 7:45pm	ANZ Stadium	Tony Archer; Matt Cecchin	45,631
Brisbane Broncos	40 – 10	New Zealand Warriors	10 September 2011, 6:45pm	Suncorp Stadium	Jared Maxwell; Shayne Hayne	48,943
Manly Warringah Sea Eagles	42 – 8	North Queensland Cowboys	10 September 2011, 8:30pm	Sydney Football Stadium	Ben Cummins; Gavin Badger	13,972
Melbourne Storm	18 – 8	Newcastle Knights	11 September 2011, 4:00pm	AAMI Park	Ashley Klein; Adam Devcich	14,845
SEMI FINALS
Wests Tigers	20 – 22	New Zealand Warriors	16 September 2011, 7:45pm	Sydney Football Stadium	Shayne Hayne; Jared Maxwell	27,109
Brisbane Broncos †	13 – 12	St. George Illawarra Dragons	17 September 2011, 6:45pm	Suncorp Stadium	Tony Archer; Matt Cecchin	48,474
PRELIMINARY FINALS
Manly Warringah Sea Eagles	26 – 14	Brisbane Broncos	23 September 2011, 7:45pm	Sydney Football Stadium	Shayne Hayne; Jared Maxwell	31,894
Melbourne Storm	12 – 20	New Zealand Warriors	24 September 2011, 7:45pm	AAMI Park	Tony Archer; Matt Cecchin	28,580

† - Match decided in golden point extra time

=== Finals chart ===
Qualifying finals
1	Melbourne	18
8	Newcastle	8
2	Manly	42
7	North Queensland	8
3	Brisbane	40
6	New Zealand	10
4	Wests	21
5	St. George Illawarra	12

Semifinals
4W	Wests	20
2L	New Zealand	22
3W	Brisbane	13
1L	St. George Illawarra	12

Preliminary finals
1W	Melbourne	12
New Zealand	20
2W	Manly	26
Brisbane	14

Final
Manly	24
New Zealand	10

== Grand Final ==
Sunday, 2 October
5:00pm (AEDT)

Manly-Warringah Sea Eagles	24 – 10	New Zealand Warriors
Tries: Brett Stewart (30') 1 Daly Cherry-Evans (40') 1 Glenn Stewart (57') 1 Jamie Lyon (79') 1 Goals: Jamie Lyon 3/3 (32', 40', 58'); Michael Robertson 1/1 (80')	1st: 12 - 2; 2nd: 12 - 8 report	Tries: Manu Vatuvei (62') 1 Elijah Taylor (68') 1 Goals: James Maloney 1/3 (28' pen)

ANZ Stadium
Attendance: 81,988
Clive Churchill Medal: Glenn Stewart
Referee: Tony Archer, Matt Cecchin

== Club and player records ==
The following statistics are correct as of the conclusion of Round 26.

Top 5-point scorers

Points	Player	Tries	Goals	Field Goals
195	Chris Sandow	6	82	7
186	Benji Marshall	11	70	2
180	James Maloney	8	73	2
164	Luke Burt	10	62	0
158	Johnathan Thurston	10	59	0

Top 5 try scorers

Tries	Player
23	Ben Barba
23	Nathan Merritt
21	Ashley Graham
19	Akuila Uate
16	David Mead

Top 5 goal scorers

Goals	Player
82	Chris Sandow
73	James Maloney
73	Cameron Smith
70	Benji Marshall
65	Corey Parker

Most points in a match by an individual

Points	Player	Tries	Goals	FG	Opponent	Score	Venue	Round
20	Luke Burt	2	6/7	0	Cronulla-Sutherland Sharks	40–6	Sydney Football Stadium	Round 11
20	Nathan Merritt	5	0	0	Parramatta Eels	56–6	ANZ Stadium	Round 22
20	Chris Sandow	1	8/10	0	Parramatta Eels	56–6	ANZ Stadium	Round 22
20	Johnathan Thurston	2	6/7	0	Parramatta Eels	40–26	Dairy Farmers Stadium	Round 10

Most tries in a match by an individual

Tries	Player	Opponent	Score	Venue	Round
5	Nathan Merritt	Parramatta Eels	56–6	ANZ Stadium	Round 22
4	Ben Barba	Canberra Raiders	36–22	ANZ Stadium	Round 26
4	Akuila Uate	South Sydney Rabbitohs	40–24	Ausgrid Stadium	Round 26

Paul Gallen ran 3,670 metres with the ball in 2011, more than any other player in the competition.

== Attendances ==
The regular season attendances for the 2011 season aggregated to a total of 3,123,055 (average 16,267), becoming the second highest attended NRL season (after 2010).

The highest twenty regular season match attendances:

Crowd	Venue	Home team	Opponent	Round
50,859	Suncorp Stadium	Brisbane Broncos	Manly Warringah Sea Eagles	Round 26
45,119	Suncorp Stadium	Brisbane Broncos	North Queensland Cowboys	Round 1
40,094	Suncorp Stadium	Brisbane Broncos	South Sydney Rabbitohs	Round 25
38,412	Eden Park	New Zealand Warriors	Parramatta Eels	Round 1
37,173	Suncorp Stadium	Brisbane Broncos	New Zealand Warriors	Round 22
34,976	Sydney Football Stadium	Sydney Roosters	St George Illawarra Dragons	Round 7
34,322	ANZ Stadium	Canterbury-Bankstown Bulldogs	St George Illawarra Dragons	Round 10
34,185	Suncorp Stadium	Brisbane Broncos	St George Illawarra Dragons	Round 15
34,175	Suncorp Stadium	Brisbane Broncos	Melbourne Storm	Round 9
32,283	Suncorp Stadium (Double Header)	Manly Warringah Sea Eagles; Canterbury-Bankstown Bulldogs	Brisbane Broncos; Gold Coast Titans	Round 12
31,122	Sydney Cricket Ground	St George Illawarra Dragons	Canterbury-Bankstown Bulldogs	Round 5
31,035	Suncorp Stadium	Brisbane Broncos	Gold Coast Titans	Round 19
30,729	Ausgrid Stadium	Newcastle Knights	South Sydney Rabbitohs	Round 26
30,687	ANZ Stadium	Parramatta Eels	Canterbury-Bankstown Bulldogs	Round 6
30,127	Suncorp Stadium	Brisbane Broncos	Wests Tigers	Round 17
30,538	Suncorp Stadium	Brisbane Broncos	Canterbury-Bankstown Bulldogs	Round 8
28,703	Sydney Football Stadium	Sydney Roosters	South Sydney Rabbitohs	Round 1
27,687	Sydney Football Stadium	Wests Tigers	St George Illawarra Dragons	Round 22
26,737	ANZ Stadium	Canterbury-Bankstown Bulldogs	Wests Tigers	Round 1
26,463	Dairy Farmers Stadium	North Queensland Cowboys	Brisbane Broncos	Round 23
25,623	Suncorp Stadium	Brisbane Broncos	Penrith Panthers	Round 4

== 2011 Transfers ==
=== Players ===
Player	2010 Club	2011 Club
Israel Folau	Brisbane Broncos	Greater Western Sydney Giants (Australian rules football)
Lagi Setu	Brisbane Broncos	Hiatus
Ashton Sims	Brisbane Broncos	North Queensland Cowboys
Antonio Winterstein	Brisbane Broncos	North Queensland Cowboys
Scott Logan	Canberra Raiders	Retirement
Adam Mogg	Canberra Raiders	Retirement
Joel Monaghan	Canberra Raiders	Super League: Warrington Wolves
Troy Thompson	Canberra Raiders	Melbourne Storm
Yileen Gordon	Canterbury-Bankstown Bulldogs	Penrith Panthers
Ben Hannant	Canterbury-Bankstown Bulldogs	Brisbane Broncos
Jarrad Hickey	Canterbury-Bankstown Bulldogs	Super League: Wakefield Trinity Wildcats
Brett Kimmorley	Canterbury-Bankstown Bulldogs	Retirement
Luke Patten	Canterbury-Bankstown Bulldogs	Super League: Salford City Reds
Trent Barrett	Cronulla-Sutherland Sharks	Retirement
Luke Covell	Cronulla-Sutherland Sharks	Retirement
Adam Cuthbertson	Cronulla-Sutherland Sharks	St. George Illawarra Dragons
Blake Ferguson	Cronulla-Sutherland Sharks	Canberra Raiders
Grant Millington	Cronulla-Sutherland Sharks	Canterbury-Bankstown Bulldogs
Jordan Atkins	Gold Coast Titans	Parramatta Eels
Aaron Cannings	Gold Coast Titans	Tweed Heads Seagulls (Intrust Super Cup)
Josh Graham	Gold Coast Titans	Retirement
Chris Bailey	Manly Warringah Sea Eagles	Super League: Harlequins RL
Matthew Cross	Manly Warringah Sea Eagles	Retirement
Ben Farrar	Manly Warringah Sea Eagles	Super League: Catalans Dragons
Trent Hodkinson	Manly Warringah Sea Eagles	Canterbury-Bankstown Bulldogs
Josh Perry	Manly Warringah Sea Eagles	Super League: St. Helens
Brett Finch	Melbourne Storm	Super League: Wigan Warriors
Ryan Hoffman	Melbourne Storm	Super League: Wigan Warriors
Greg Inglis	Melbourne Storm	South Sydney Rabbitohs
Jeff Lima	Melbourne Storm	Super League: Wigan Warriors
Aiden Tolman	Melbourne Storm	Canterbury-Bankstown Bulldogs
Brett White	Melbourne Storm	Canberra Raiders
Ben Cross	Newcastle Knights	Super League: Leeds Rhinos
Scott Dureau	Newcastle Knights	Super League: Catalans Dragons
Steve Simpson	Newcastle Knights	Retirement
Cooper Vuna	Newcastle Knights	Melbourne Rebels (Super Rugby)
Patrick Ah Van	New Zealand Warriors	Super League: Bradford Bulls
Ian Henderson	New Zealand Warriors	Super League: Catalans Dragons
Jesse Royal	New Zealand Warriors	Retirement
Brent Tate	New Zealand Warriors	North Queensland Cowboys
Ben Harris	North Queensland Cowboys	Retirement
Manase Manuokafoa	North Queensland Cowboys	Parramatta Eels
Willie Mason	North Queensland Cowboys	Super League: Hull Kingston Rovers
Luke O'Donnell	North Queensland Cowboys	Super League: Huddersfield Giants
Steve Rapira	North Queensland Cowboys	New Zealand Warriors
Grant Rovelli	North Queensland Cowboys	Mackay Cutters (Intrust Super Cup)
Steve Southern	North Queensland Cowboys	Newcastle Knights
Anthony Watts	North Queensland Cowboys	N/A
Carl Webb	North Queensland Cowboys	Parramatta Eels
John Williams	North Queensland Cowboys	Cronulla-Sutherland Sharks
Ty Williams	North Queensland Cowboys	Retirement
Nathan Cayless	Parramatta Eels	Retirement
Eric Grothe Jr.	Parramatta Eels	Retirement
Krisnan Inu	Parramatta Eels	New Zealand Warriors
Kris Keating	Parramatta Eels	Canterbury-Bankstown Bulldogs
Feleti Mateo	Parramatta Eels	New Zealand Warriors
Timana Tahu	Parramatta Eels	Penrith Panthers
Maurice Blair	Penrith Panthers	Melbourne Storm
Gavin Cooper	Penrith Panthers	North Queensland Cowboys
Shane Elford	Penrith Panthers	Retirement
Wade Graham	Penrith Panthers	Cronulla-Sutherland Sharks
Frank Pritchard	Penrith Panthers	Canterbury-Bankstown Bulldogs
Frank Puletua	Penrith Panthers	Retirement
Colin Best	South Sydney Rabbitohs	Cronulla-Sutherland Sharks
Luke Capewell	South Sydney Rabbitohs	Gold Coast Titans
Beau Champion	South Sydney Rabbitohs	Melbourne Storm
Garret Crossman	South Sydney Rabbitohs	Retirement
Jaiman Lowe	South Sydney Rabbitohs	Melbourne Storm
Jamie Simpson	South Sydney Rabbitohs	Super League: Huddersfield Giants
Craig Stapleton	South Sydney Rabbitohs	Retirement
Neville Costigan	St. George Illawarra Dragons	Newcastle Knights
Luke Priddis	St. George Illawarra Dragons	Retirement
Jarrod Saffy	St. George Illawarra Dragons	Melbourne Rebels (Super Rugby)
Jeremy Smith	St. George Illawarra Dragons	Cronulla-Sutherland Sharks
James Aubusson	Sydney Roosters	Retirement
Ben Jones	Sydney Roosters	North Queensland Cowboys
Nick Kouparitsas	Sydney Roosters	Super League: Harlequins RL
Lopini Paea	Sydney Roosters	Super League: Catalans Dragons
Jason Cayless	Wests Tigers	Retirement
Daniel Fitzhenry	Wests Tigers	Retirement
John Skandalis	Wests Tigers	Retirement
Glenn Hall	Super League: Bradford Bulls	North Queensland Cowboys
Matt Orford	Super League: Bradford Bulls	Canberra Raiders
Dane Carlaw	Super League: Catalans Dragons	Brisbane Broncos
Dallas Johnson	Super League: Catalans Dragons	North Queensland Cowboys
Casey McGuire	Super League: Catalans Dragons	Parramatta Eels
Chris Walker	Super League: Catalans Dragons	Parramatta Eels
Paul Whatuira	Super League: Huddersfield Giants	Parramatta Eels
Shaun Berrigan	Super League: Hull F.C.	New Zealand Warriors
Greg Eastwood	Super League: Leeds Rhinos	Canterbury-Bankstown Bulldogs
Shane Tronc	Super League: Wakefield Trinity Wildcats	Brisbane Broncos
Chris Hicks	Super League: Warrington Wolves	Parramatta Eels
Mark Riddell	Super League: Wigan Warriors	Sydney Roosters
Chris Houston	N/A	Newcastle Knights
Reni Maitua	N/A	Parramatta Eels
Reece Simmonds	N/A	St. George Illawarra Dragons
Matt Utai	N/A	Wests Tigers
Dayne Weston	N/A	Penrith Panthers
Adam Woolnough	N/A	Melbourne Storm

== See also ==
- 2011 NRL season results
- 2011 NRL Under-20s season
