= Michael Lett =

Australian rugby league footballer

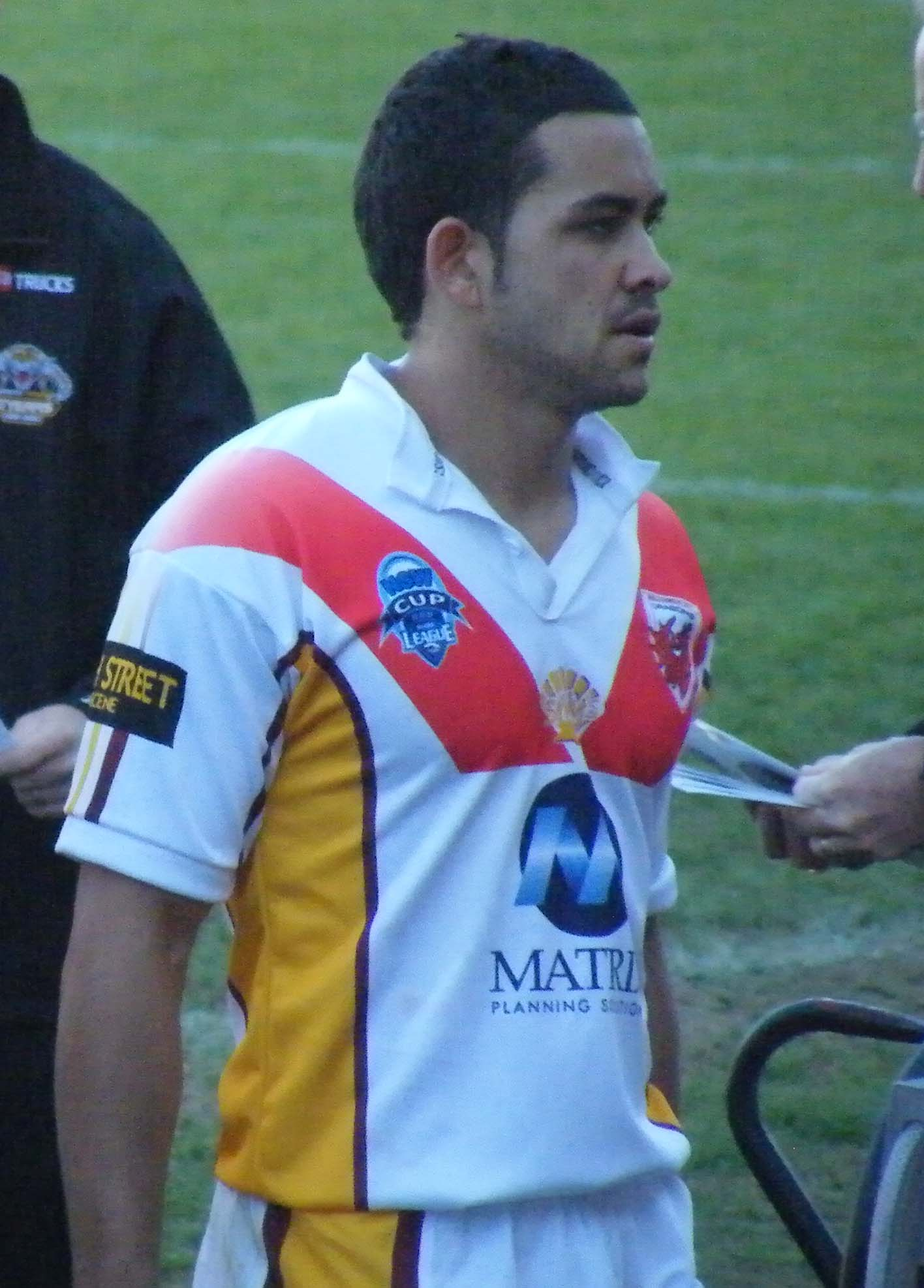
- Lett playing in the NSW Cup in 2009

Personal information
- Full name: Michael Lett
- Born: 11 March 1987 (age 38); Penrith, New South Wales, Australia

Playing information
- Height: 180 cm (5 ft 11 in)
- Weight: 83 kg (13 st 1 lb)
- Position: Wing, Centre, Fullback
Club
Years	Team	Pld	T	G	FG	P
2005–06	Sydney Roosters	3	0	0	0	0
2008–10	St George Illawarra	8	4	0	0	16
2011	Canterbury-Bankstown	3	2	0	0	8
	Total	14	6	0	0	24

Michael Lett (born 11 March 1987) is an Australian former professional rugby league footballer who played in the 2000s and 2010s. He played in the NRL for the Sydney Roosters, St. George Illawarra Dragons and the Canterbury-Bankstown Bulldogs usually in the centres.

== Early life ==
Lett was born in Penrith, New South Wales, Australia. He attended Sarah Redfern High School and whilst there played for the Australian Schoolboys team in 2004.

He played for the Junior Kangaroos on 8 October 2005 against Papua New Guinea in Darwin.

== Playing career ==
Lett joined the Sydney Roosters and on 17 June 2005 played his first National Rugby League game for them in their Round 15 match of the 2005 NRL Premiership season against the Cronulla-Sutherland Sharks at Toyota Park. He played three games for the club in that season.

Lett then went to play for St. George Illawarra Dragons for three seasons (2008–2010). He scored his first try for St. George Illawarra in Round 10 of the 2008 NRL season against the Melbourne Storm at ANZ Stadium.

Lett joined the Canterbury-Bankstown Bulldogs in 2011 where he played just two games scoring two tries. Lett then returned to the NSW Cup team and helped them to a grand final victory. Lett then played for the Picton Magpies in the Group 6 Rugby League competition. In May 2012 it was announced that Lett retired from football to pursue a career in mining to gain a better income to support his young family.
