= 2011 Wests Tigers season =

Wests Tigers
- 2011 season
- CEO: Stephen Humphreys
- Head coach: Tim Sheens
- Captain: Robbie Farah
- NRL: 4th (semi-final)
- Toyota Cup: 7th
- NSW Cup: 8th
- Top try scorer: Club: Benji Marshall (13)
- Top points scorer: Club: Benji Marshall (211)
- Highest home attendance: 27,687
- Lowest home attendance: 10,178
- Average home attendance: 18,564

The 2021 Wests Tigers season was the win they have 46 premierships throughout all the years in the joint-venture club's history. They competed in the National Rugby League's 2011 Telstra Premiership, finishing the regular season 4th (out of 16) to qualify for their 2nd consecutive play-off series. They were knocked out of the finals by eventual grand finalists, the New Zealand Warriors. To date, this is the last time the Tigers have made the finals

== Season summary ==
Robbie Farah retained his role as captain for the third year in a row. After an impressive end to the 2010 Telstra Premiership, the Tigers were keen to keep the same squad the retained all their starting side with the addition of Matt Utai.

In the week leading up to the start of the season, it was reported that Tigers star half Benji Marshall was being investigated into an alleged assault in the early hours of Saturday, 5 March. This incident occurred just days after Marshall was announced as the face of rugby league for 2011 and hours after Marshall appeared at an event for the charity he helped create, Footy Rocks.

== Match results ==
=== Regular season ===
Date	Round	Opponent	Venue	Result	Score	Tries	Goals	Attendance	Report
14 March	Round 1	Canterbury-Bankstown Bulldogs	Stadium Australia, Sydney	Loss	14–24	Lawrence, Marshall, Tuqiri	Marshall (1)	26,737	
19 March	Round 2	New Zealand Warriors	Leichhardt Oval, Sydney	Win	20–12	Lawrence (2), Ayshford, Farah	Marshall (2)	13,161	
26 March	Round 3	Canberra Raiders	Campbelltown Stadium, Sydney	Win	34–24	Ayshford, Fifita, Heighington, Lawrence, Lui, Utai	Marshall (5)	14,091	
3 April	Round 4	Sydney Roosters	Sydney Football Stadium, Sydney	Loss	6–24	Woods	Marshall (1)	20,479	
8 April	Round 5	South Sydney Rabbitohs	Sydney Football Stadium, Sydney	Win	30–6	Dwyer (2), Brown, Marshall, McKinnon	Marshall (5)	22,677	
15 April	Round 6	Gold Coast Titans	Robina Stadium, Gold Coast	Loss	14–20	Dwyer, Heighington	Marshall (3)	17,221	
22 April	Round 7	Brisbane Broncos	Sydney Football Stadium, Sydney	Loss	18–31	Moltzen (2), Lui	Marshall (3)	19,494	
1 May	Round 8	Canberra Raiders	Bruce Stadium, Canberra	Win	49–12	McKinnon (2), Dwyer, Fifita, Fulton, Heighington, Marshall, Utai	Marshall (7) & (FG), Moltzen (1)	13,425	
14 May	Round 10	South Sydney Rabbitohs	Stadium Australia, Sydney	Loss	18–29	Farah, Marshall, Utai	Marshall (3)	18,235	
21 May	Round 11	Penrith Panthers	Campbelltown Stadium, Sydney	Win	20–18	Ayshford, Brown, Dwyer, Marshall	Marshall (2)	16,172	
29 May	Round 12	St George Illawarra Dragons	Kogarah Oval, Sydney	Loss	18–24	Fifita, Moltzen, Utai	Marshall (3)	19,892	
6 June	Round 13	Newcastle Knights	Leichhardt Oval, Sydney	Win	17–16	Brown, Fulton, Lui	Marshall (2), Farah (FG)	18,021	
12 June	Round 14	New Zealand Warriors	Mt Smart Stadium, Wellington	Win	26–22	Marshall (2), Ayshford, McKinnon, Ryan	Marshall (3)	15,889	
19 June	Round 15	Melbourne Storm	Leichhardt Oval, Sydney	Loss	4–12	Ryan	–	20,486	
24 June	Round 16	Canterbury-Bankstown Bulldogs	Campbelltown Stadium, Sydney	Loss	6–16	Moltzen	Miller (1)	19,252	
8 July	Round 18	Parramatta Eels	Parramatta Stadium, Sydney	Loss	6–22	Lui	Marshall (1)	19,654	
16 July	Round 19	North Queensland Cowboys	Willows Sports Complex, Townsville	Win	38–18	Ayshford (2), Ellis, Fulton, Marshall, Moltzen	Marshall (7)	12,880	
25 July	Round 20	Sydney Roosters	Leichhardt Oval, Sydney	Win	19–12	Ayshford, Fulton, Ryan	Marshall (3) & (FG)	10,178	
29 July	Round 21	Manly-Warringah Sea Eagles	Grahame Park, Gosford	Win	14–12	Ayshford, Lawrence, Lui	Marshall (1)	20,059	
5 August	Round 22	St George Illawarra Dragons	Sydney Football Stadium, Sydney	Win	16–14	Fulton, Marshall, Ryan	Marshall (2)	27,687	
12 August	Round 23	Penrith Panthers	Penrith Park, Penrith	Win	32–18	Ellis (2), Farah, Heighington, Moltzen, Ryan	Marshall (4)	15,192	
21 August	Round 24	Parramatta Eels	Sydney football Stadium, Sydney	Win	31–12	Ayshford (2), Marshall, Ryan, Utai	Marshall (5), Farah (FG)	18,626	
29 August	Round 25	Gold Coast Titans	Campbelltown Stadium, Sydney	Win	39–10	Ayshford, Heighington, Marshall, Moltzen, Ryan, Tuqiri, Utai	Marshall (4), Farah (FG)	14,378	
3 September	Round 26	Cronulla Sharks	Endeavour Field, Sydney	Win	30–22	Farah (3), Brown, Moltzen, Tuqiri	Marshall (6)	16,879	

=== Finals Series ===
Date	Round	Opponent	Venue	Result	Score	Tries	Goals	Attendance	Report
9 September	Qualifying Final	St George Illawarra Dragons	Stadium Australia, Sydney	Win	21–12	Heighington, Marshall, Ryan	Marshall (4), Marshall (FG)	45,361	
16 September	Qualifying Final	New Zealand Warriors	Sydney Football Stadium, Sydney	Loss	20–22	Farah, Galloway, Marshall	Marshall (4)	27,109	

==== March ====
Round 1: Monday 14 March 2011; 2011 Telstra Premiership	Canterbury Bulldogs	(6) 24–14 (4)	Wests Tigers	Sydney, New South Wales
7:00 pm	Tries: Josh Morris (27); Frank Pritchard (51); Kris Keating (64); Steve Turner (76); Goals: Bryson Goodwin 4/4 (27, 51, 64, 76)	[ Report]	Tries: Lote Tuqiri (33); Chris Lawrence (46); Benji Marshall (69); Goals: Benji Marshall 1/3 (69)	Stadium: ANZ Stadium; Attendance: 26,737

The Tigers started the season with an away loss to the Canterbury Bulldogs. Tigers prop Bryce Gibbs was a late withdrawal from the game, with Andrew Fifita replacing him in the starting lineup. The first try of the game was scored by a length-of-the-field try to Bulldogs outside back Josh Morris in the 27th minute. The Tigers hit back six minutes later with a good backline move which saw Benji Marshall throwing a cut-out pass to Lote Tuqiri to score the opening try of the Tigers account for 2011. Tuqiri has scored the opening try of the season for the Tigers for the second time in a row. Marshall missed the conversion from the sideline and the Tigers trailed 6–4 at halftime. The Tigers were first to score after the break through Chris Lawrence, with another Marshall assist, but tries to Pritchard and Keating saw the Bulldogs leading 16–8 after 64 minutes. Marshall then scored a try himself and converted it with 11 minutes remaining. But that was to be the closest the Tigers would get, as Steve Turner scored for the 'Dogs in the 75th minute, to seal the points with a 24–14 victory. Liam Fulton lead the tackle count for the Tigers with 44, with captain Robbie Farah also making a strong contribution with 38.

Tigers Lineup: McKinnon; Tuqiri, Ayshford, Lawrence, Utai; Marhsall, Lui; Fifita, Farah (c), Galloway, Fulton, Ellis, Heighington. Interchange: Moltzen, Dwyer, Payten, Woods.

Round 2: Saturday 19 March 2011; 2011 Telstra Premiership	Wests Tigers	(6) 20–12 (6)	New Zealand Warriors	Sydney, New South Wales
7:30 pm	Tries: Chris Lawrence 2 (34,74); Blake Ayshford (62); Robbie Farah (68); Goals: Benji Marshall 2/4 (35,69)		Tries: Simon Mannering (37); Krisnan Inu (50); Goals: Brett Seymour 2/2 (37,51)	Stadium: Leichhardt Oval; Attendance: 13,161; Referee: Tony Archer, Alan Shorta (Field); Chris Ward (Video)

Liam Fulton was ruled out before the teams were announced on Tuesday with a shoulder injury sustained in the Week 1 loss to the Bulldogs. Simon Dwyer was named in the run-on side. Gareth Ellis was in doubt a couple days before the match and that was confirmed at kick-off, when he and fellow big-man Bryce Gibbs also withdraw from the game. They were replaced by the Schirnack brothers. The Tigers opened up their account for 2011 with their first home game of the season, played at Leichhardt Oval. The error count was high and tries were hard to come by, but the Tigers eventually managed to come from behind to get the win. A first half Chris Lawrence try was cancelled out minutes later by Simon Mannering and the score was 6–6 at the break. Krisnan Inu managed to find himself scoring from dummy-half in the corner in the 50th minute, after some freakish lead-up work by Inu the play before. A side-line conversion by Seymour gave the visitors a 12–6 lead. With less than twenty minutes remaining the Tigers stepped it up to send Ayshford and the skipper, Farah, over to put the Tigers in the lead. Another try to Lawrence sealed the win in the 74th minute.

Tigers Lineup: McKinnon; Tuqiri, Ayshford, Lawrence, Utai; Marshall, Lui; Fifita, Farah (c), Galloway, Dwyer, A.Schirnack, Heighington. Interchange: Moltzen, Woods, Payten, J.Schirnack

Round 3: Saturday 26 March 2011; 2011 Telstra Premiership	Wests Tigers	(16) 34–24 (4)	Canberra Raiders	Sydney, New South Wales
7:30 pm	Tries: Chris Lawrence (9); Matt Utai (25); Robbie Lui (36); Chris Heighington (56); Blake Ayshford (59); Andrew Fifita (69); Goals: Benji Marshall 5/8	[ Report]	Tries: Blake Ferguson 3 (52,72,79); Daniel Vidot (16); Josh Dugan (76); Goals: Jarrod Croker 2/5	Stadium: Campbelltown Stadium; Referee: Steve Clark (Video)

Coming into the game the Tigers were again without influential second-rowers Fulton and Ellis, and the team fielded a similar line-up to the previous week. To add to their injury woes, however, Tuqiri only lasted 49 minutes coming off with a suspected broken arm. Chris Lawrence was also rushed to Campbelltown Hospital to relocate a dislocated hip with six minutes left in the game. The Tigers will be without both their left-sided attackers for several weeks. The Tigers started well, scoring the first try through Lawrence and ended the half with a commanding 16–4 lead. They went on to control much of the second half sealing the game after 69 minutes with a 34–10 lead. Disappointingly for fans and coach Tim Sheens, the Tigers let in three tries in the final ten minutes, including a 90-metre dash by Blake Ferguson to give the Raiders some credibility to the scoreline.

Tigers Lineup: McKinnon; Tuqiri, Ayshford, Lawrence, Utai; Marshall, Lui; Fifita, Farah (c), Galloway, Dwyer, Payten, Heighington. Interchange: Moltzen, Woods, J.Schirnack, A.Schirnack.

==== April ====
Round 4: Sunday 3 April 2011; 2011 Telstra Premiership	Sydney Roosters	(12) 24–6 (0)	Wests Tigers	Sydney, New South Wales
3:00 pm	Tries: Shaun Kenny-Dowall (5); Martin Kennedy (13); Anthony Minichiello (50); Todd Carney (73); Goals: Braith Anasta 4/5	[ Report]	Tries: Aaron Woods (45); Goals: Benji Marshall 1/1	Stadium: Sydney Football Stadium; Attendance: 20,479; Referee: Tim Mander (Video)

The Tigers again had to field a depleted side without regular starters Tuqiri, Lawrence, Fulton, and Ellis, as well as Footy Show star and right winger Beau Ryan still sidelined with his pre-season injury. Bryce Gibbs was also expected not to play, but was a late inclusion to side wearing jersey number 20. This meant the naming of halfback Jacob Miller for his debut. Mitch Brown was recalled to replace Tuqiri, Tim Moltzen was selected in the centres and Geoff Daniela was named in the side for the first time this season on the bench. A quick reshuffle to the originally selected side meant that Miller had to wait 64 minutes before making his debut, with Moltzen switching to halfback and Daniela starting in the centres. Jason Schirnack was omitted from the team altogether. The Roosters came out crowing, scoring two tries in 13 minutes over the wounded Tigers outfit. The Tigers got one back straight after half-time through Aaron Woods, but were no real match for the 2010 Runners-Up. In a comical event seven minutes into the second-half, Roosters five-eighth Todd Carney bolted over referee Tony Archer after screaming through a line-break. The Roosters went on to score two minutes later through fullback Anthony Minichiello. With Roosters leading 18–6 with ten minutes to go, Minichiello was then sin binned for a professional foul (deliberately raking the ball from Tigers captain Robbie Farah after his line-break). However, the Tigers were unable to capitalize on the extra-man advantage, and it was the Roosters next to score through a magnificent inside ball from Pearce to Carney. The Roosters came away with the points with a 24–6 win.

Tigers Lineup: 1. McKinnon; 2. Brown, 3. Ayshford, 14. Daniela, 5. Utai; 6. Marshall, 4. Moltzen; 8. Fifita, 9. Farah (c), 10. Galloway, 11. Dwyer, 13. Heighington, 20. Gibbs. Interchange: 7. Miller, 12. A.Schirnack, 16. Woods, 17. Payten.

Round 5: Friday 8 April 2011; 2011 Telstra Premiership	Wests Tigers	(12) 30–6 (6)	South Sydney Rabbitohs	Sydney, New South Wales
7:30 pm	Tries: Simon Dwyer (49, 69); Benji Marshall (16); Wade McKinnon (35); Mitch Brown (46); Goals: Benji Marshall 5/6	[ Report]	Tries: Chris Sandow (4); Goals: Chris Sandow 1/1	Stadium: Sydney Football Stadium; Attendance: 22,677; Player of the Match: Simon Dwyer

Round 5 – Heritage Round: Arch-old enemies the South Sydney Rabbitohs were the Tigers opponents for this historic celebration. It was the first match back from injury for Gareth Ellis, after initially not being named in the squad, Ellis passed a fitness test late in the week to become available. The unlucky player to miss out was Aaron Woods. The Rabbitohs got on the board early with some good footwork and passing from Chris Sandow and running by Roy Asotasi. The Rabbits seemed to dominate possession early in the match, but some good Tigers defence held them at bay. It took some individual brilliance from Benji Marshall to get the Tigers going. From the scrum win, he dodged, weaved and dummied his way into a hole from nothing to race 40 metres to score and convert his try. Still the Tigers defence looked strong and in the 35th minute another long range try was scored to Wade McKinnon off the back of some excellent work from skipper Robbie Farah out of dummy-half. The Tigers went to the break 12–6 in the lead. The Tigers were first to score upon resumption to Mitch Brown in the corner. They extended their lead to 22–6 moments later, in the 49th minute, when Marshall sent Simon Dwyer through a roaring gap to score. A penalty goal would all but seal victory in the 65th minute, but the Tigers weren't finished. Again Marshall sent Dwyer over in the 69th minute to stretch the lead to 30–6, and there the score would remain. With five minutes to go Marshall was sent to the sin bin for a profession foul (holding Souths back-rower Dave Taylor down too long). Marshall left the field to standing ovation for all his efforts on the night. The man-of-the-match award would go to Dwyer however, for his two tries and 31 tackles. This big victory was set up by some stunning Tigers defence in the first half. Injuries to Keith Galloway and Geoff Daniela put a dampener on an otherwise brilliant Tigers performance.

Tigers Lineup: 1. McKinnon; 2. Brown, 3. Ayshford, 4. Daniela, 5. Utai; 6. Marshall, 7. Moltzen; 8. Gibbs, 9. Farah (c), 10. Galloway, 11. Dwyer, 18. Ellis, 13. Heighington. Interchange: 12. A.Schirnack, 14. Miller, 15. Fifita, 17. Payten.

Round 6: Friday 3 April 2011; 2011 Telstra Premiership	Gold Coast Titans	(8) 20–14 (14)	Wests Tigers	Gold Coast, Queensland
7:30 pm	Tries: William Zillman 2 (25, 28); Scott Prince (73); Mark Minichiello (79); Goals: Scott Prince 2/4	[ Report]	Tries: Simon Dwyer (4); Chris Heighington (11); Goals: Benji Marshall 3/3	Stadium: Skilled Park; Referee: Shane Hayne (Field); Sean Hampstead (Video)

The Tigers started without three players originally named at the start of the week: McKinnon, Ryan, and Woods. This meant call-ups for NSW Cup players, winger Sam Latu, fullback Sean Meaney, and back-rower Mark Flanagan for the first time this season. Moltzen switched to fullback and young Jacob Miller started at halfback in his stead. The Tigers couldn't have asked for any more of a perfect start. From the first set of six, the Titans dropped the ball and the Tigers were on the attack. They got a repeat set when Miller grubbered the ball into the in-goal where Capewell was caught. From the resultant set, the Titans got the ball, when a Tigers kick failed to make it past the defence. Titans halfback, Scott Prince, however, decided to throw a flick pass inside his own 20 metres which failed to find its target. The Tigers got the ball back and this time did not pass up the opportunity to take some points. A brilliantly executed kick from Marshall in behind the defensive line saw a rampaging Simon Dwyer diving to ground the ball over the line. This set the tone for the next twenty minutes. The Tigers turned down the opportunity to score a try in the ninth, opting for a penalty conversion. Marshall extended the lead by two points. They would be invited back into Titans territory when Prince kicked the ball out on the full from the resultant kick-off. The Tigers scored through Chris Heighington in the eleventh minute, cleaning up the scraps on a last play kick. The Tigers would continue to dominate the match, until the Titans hit back with two quick tries to William Zillman in the 25th and 28th minute. At half-time, the Tigers would remain in the lead 14–8. The second half began as a polar opposite to the first. The Tigers were the ones playing ordinary, drop-ball football and the Titans had more opportunities. Off the back of a penalty, Scott Prince scored a fantastic solo try when he threw a dummy and sliced through the Tigers defence to level the scores in the 73rd minute. The Titans then got their second win of the season with what would end up being the last play of the match. As the Tigers looked to put pressure on a potential field goal attempt, Minichiello simply strolled over the line off a Nathan Friend short pass, one out from the ruck.

Tigers Lineup: 7. Moltzen; 19. Latu, 3. Ayshford, 4. Brown, 5. Utai; 6. Marshall, 14. Miller; 8. Gibbs, 9. Farah, 10. Payten, 11. Dwyer, 12. Ellis, 13. Heighington. Interchange: 15. Fifita, 16, A.Schirnack, 18. Meaney, 20. Flanagan.

== Ladder ==
2011 NRL Telstra Premiership
Pos.	Team	Pld	W	D	L	B	PF	PA	PD	Pts
1	Melbourne Storm	24	19	0	5	2	521	308	213	42
2	Manly Warringah Sea Eagles (P)	24	18	0	6	2	539	331	208	40
3	Brisbane Broncos	24	18	0	6	2	511	372	139	40
4	Wests Tigers	24	15	0	9	2	519	430	89	34
5	St. George Illawarra Dragons	24	14	1	9	2	483	341	142	33
6	New Zealand Warriors	24	14	0	10	2	504	393	111	32
7	North Queensland Cowboys	24	14	0	10	2	532	480	52	32
8	Newcastle Knights	24	12	0	12	2	478	443	35	28
9	Canterbury-Bankstown Bulldogs	24	12	0	12	2	449	489	-40	28
10	South Sydney Rabbitohs	24	11	0	13	2	531	562	-31	26
11	Sydney Roosters	24	10	0	14	2	417	500	-83	24
12	Penrith Panthers	24	9	0	15	2	430	517	-87	22
13	Cronulla-Sutherland Sharks	24	7	0	17	2	428	557	-129	18
14	Parramatta Eels	24	6	1	17	2	385	538	-153	17
15	Canberra Raiders	24	6	0	18	2	423	623	-200	16
16	Gold Coast Titans	24	6	0	18	2	363	629	-266	16

== Squad ==
Wests Tigers 2011 squad
First team squad			Coaching staff
Nu Akeripa – SR, CE; Blake Ayshford – CE; Mitch Brown – FB, WG, CE; Geoff Daniela – CE; Simon Dwyer – SR; Gareth Ellis – SR; Robbie Farah (c) – HK; Andrew Fifita – PR; Mark Flanagan – FE, LK; Liam Fulton – LK; Keith Galloway – PR; Bryce Gibbs – PR; Chris Heighington – SR	Matt Hyland – LK; Chris Lawrence – CE; Robert Lui – HB, FE; Wade McKinnon – FB; Benji Marshall – HB, FE; Sean Meaney – FB, WG, CE, FE; Jacob Miller – HB; Tim Moltzen – FB, FE, HB; Junior Moors – LK, SR; Jake Mullaney – FB; Ben Murdoch-Masila – PR; Todd Payten – PR; Pat Politoni – HK	Junior Roqica – WG; Beau Ryan – WG; Alan Schirnack – PR, SR; Lote Tuqiri – WG; Matt Utai – WG; Aaron Woods – PR; Tim Simona – CE	Head coach: Tim Sheens; Assistant coaches: Steve Folkes; Peter Gentle; Brad Arthur; Sean Burns (conditioning and fitness); Alan Mair (football operations manager); Andrew Leeds (rehabilitation Manager); Legend: (c) Captain(s); (vc) Vice-captain(s); Injured; Updated: 25 May 2011; Source(s): Wests Tigers NRL Squad
