= 2010 NRL season results =

Australia/New Zealand rugby league results

The 2010 NRL season consisted of 26 weekly regular season rounds, starting on 12 March and ending on 5 September, followed by four weeks of play-offs culminating in the grand final on 3 October.

== Regular season ==
=== Round 1 ===
Home	Score	Away	Match Information
Home	Score	Away	Date and Time (Local)	Venue	Referees	Crowd
Brisbane Broncos	30 – 24	North Queensland Cowboys	12 March 2010, 7:35 pm	Suncorp Stadium	Jared Maxwell; Gerard Sutton	48,516
Parramatta Eels	12 – 18	St. George Illawarra Dragons	12 March 2010, 7:35 pm	Parramatta Stadium	Tony Archer; Gavin Badger	18,293
Canterbury-Bankstown Bulldogs	16 – 20	Newcastle Knights	13 March 2010, 5:30 pm	ANZ Stadium	Jason Robinson; Bernard Sutton	18,110
Penrith Panthers	34 – 16	Canberra Raiders	13 March 2010, 7:30 pm	CUA Stadium	Steve Lyons; Alan Shortall	11,133
Cronulla-Sutherland Sharks	10 – 14	Melbourne Storm	13 March 2010, 7:30 pm	Toyota Stadium	Ben Cummins; Brett Suttor	11,820
Gold Coast Titans	24 – 18	New Zealand Warriors	14 March 2010, 1:00 pm	Skilled Park	Matt Cecchin; Chris James	16,112
South Sydney Rabbitohs	10 – 36	Sydney Roosters	14 March 2010, 3:00 pm	ANZ Stadium	Tony De Las Heras; Ashley Klein	23,149
Wests Tigers	26 – 22	Manly Warringah Sea Eagles	15 March 2010, 7:00 pm	Sydney Football Stadium	Gavin Badger; Jared Maxwell	18,421

- For the first time since 2006, the Penrith Panthers opened their season with a victory.

=== Round 2 ===
Home	Score	Away	Match Information
Home	Score	Away	Date and Time (Local)	Venue	Referees	Crowd
St. George-Illawarra Dragons	26 – 6	Canterbury-Bankstown Bulldogs	19 March 2010, 7:35 pm	WIN Stadium	Tony Archer; Matt Cecchin	16,177
South Sydney Rabbitohs	18 – 19	Gold Coast Titans	19 March 2010, 8:35 pm	ANZ Stadium	Tony De Las Heras; Ashley Klein	10,943
New Zealand Warriors	30 – 16	Cronulla-Sutherland Sharks	20 March 2010, 7:30 pm	Mt Smart Stadium	Jason Robinson; Bernard Sutton	15,314
Newcastle Knights	14 – 20	Melbourne Storm	20 March 2010, 7:30 pm	EnergyAustralia Stadium	Steve Lyons; Alan Shortall	16,242
North Queensland Cowboys	28 – 20	Penrith Panthers	20 March 2010, 8:30 pm	Dairy Farmers Stadium	Ben Cummins; Chris James	13,335
Parramatta Eels	24 – 20	Manly Warringah Sea Eagles	21 March 2010, 2:00 pm	Parramatta Stadium	Shayne Hayne; Brett Suttor	15,602
Sydney Roosters	44 – 32	Wests Tigers	21 March 2010, 3:00 pm	Sydney Football Stadium	Jarred Maxwell; Gerard Sutton	19,021
Canberra Raiders	22 – 14	Brisbane Broncos	22 March 2010, 7:00 pm	Canberra Stadium	Gavin Badger; Phil Haines	14,200

- Greg Inglis of the Melbourne Storm played his 100th club game.

=== Round 3 ===
Home	Score	Away	Match Information
Home	Score	Away	Date and Time (Local)	Venue	Referees	Crowd
Wests Tigers	23 – 12	Parramatta Eels	26 March 2010, 7:35 pm	Sydney Football Stadium	Tony Archer; Matt Cecchin	21,318
St. George Illawarra Dragons	33 – 8	North Queensland Cowboys	26 March 2010, 8:35 pm	WIN Stadium	Jared Maxwell; Gerard Sutton	13,267
Penrith Panthers	10 – 16	Melbourne Storm	27 March 2010, 5:30 pm	CUA Stadium	Gavin Badger; Phil Haines	11,024
Manly Warringah Sea Eagles	36 – 12	Newcastle Knights	27 March 2010, 7:30 pm	Bluetongue Stadium	Tony De Las Heras; Ashley Klein	12,138
Gold Coast Titans	24 – 4	Canberra Raiders	27 March 2010, 7:30 pm	Skilled Park	Ben Cummins; Chris James	11,521
Brisbane Broncos	16 – 48	New Zealand Warriors	28 March 2010, 1:00 pm	Suncorp Stadium	Steve Lyons; Alan Shortall	32,338
Canterbury-Bankstown Bulldogs	60 – 14	Sydney Roosters	28 March 2010, 3:00 pm	ANZ Stadium	Jason Robinson; Bernard Sutton	19,738
Cronulla-Sutherland Sharks	8 – 30	South Sydney Rabbitohs	29 March 2010, 7:30 pm	Toyota Stadium	Shayne Hayne; Brett Suttor	10,741

- The Cronulla-Sutherland Sharks lost their 13th straight match, squalling the competition record for a losing streak since the NRL's inception in 1998.
- The St. George Illawarra Dragons' victory meant for the first time they won the first three matches of the season.
- The Brisbane Broncos conceded the highest number of points ever in a home game.
- The Roosters' 60–14 defeat was the highest number of points conceded for the team since the NRL inception in 1998.
- Fuifui Moimoi of the Parramatta Eels played his 100th career club game.

=== Round 4 ===
Home	Score	Away	Match Information
Home	Score	Away	Date and Time (Local)	Venue	Referees	Crowd
Melbourne Storm	17 – 4	St. George Illawarra Dragons	2 April 2010, 2:10pm	Etihad Stadium	Jared Maxwell; Gerard Sutton	25,480
Sydney Roosters	25 – 6	Brisbane Broncos	2 April 2010, 8:35pm	Sydney Football Stadium	Tony Archer; Matt Cecchin	17,106
Cronulla-Sutherland Sharks	11 – 0	Parramatta Eels	3 April 2010, 5:30pm	Toyota Stadium	Tony De Las Heras; Ashley Klein	13,213
North Queensland Cowboys	32 – 18	Gold Coast Titans	3 April 2010, 6:30pm	Dairy Farmers Stadium	Steve Lyons; Alan Shortall	15,551
Canberra Raiders	22 – 35	Wests Tigers	4 April 2010, 3:00pm	Canberra Stadium	Shayne Hayne; Brett Suttor	17,112
New Zealand Warriors	6 – 14	Manly Warringah Sea Eagles	4 April 2010, 4:00pm	Mt Smart Stadium	Ben Cummins; Chris James	19,230
Newcastle Knights	30 – 34	Penrith Panthers	5 April 2010, 4:00pm	EnergyAustralia Stadium	Jason Robinson; Bernard Sutton	15,894
South Sydney Rabbitohs	38 – 16	Canterbury-Bankstown Bulldogs	5 April 2010, 7:00pm	ANZ Stadium	Gavin Badger; Phil Haines	30,120

- Nathan Cayless of the Parramatta Eels became the first player to record 200 games as club captain.
- The crowd of 25,480 at Etihad Stadium recorded Melbourne's highest ever regular season home crowd figure.
- The Sydney Roosters defeated the Brisbane Broncos at the SFS on Good Friday for the first time since 2003.
- Tim Sheens of the Wests Tigers recorded his 300th victory as a coach.
- The Cronulla-Sutherland Sharks ended their longest losing streak (13) this round.
- The North Queensland Cowboys defeated the Gold Coast Titans at home for the first time.

=== Round 5 ===
Home	Score	Away	Match Information
Home	Score	Away	Date and Time (Local)	Venue	Referees	Crowd
St. George Illawarra Dragons	34 – 16	Brisbane Broncos	9 April 2010, 7:35 pm	WIN Stadium	Matt Cecchin; Ashley Klein	15,374
Gold Coast Titans	20 – 16	Melbourne Storm	9 April 2010, 7:35 pm	Skilled Park	Ben Cummins; Jared Maxwell	20,083
South Sydney Rabbitohs	28 – 10	Newcastle Knights	10 April 2010, 5:30 pm	Bluetongue Stadium	Phil Haines; Steve Lyons	16,098
Canterbury-Bankstown Bulldogs	24 – 30	New Zealand Warriors	10 April 2010, 7:30 pm	ANZ Stadium	Tony De Las Heras; Jason Robinson	17,095
North Queensland Cowboys	16 – 23	Wests Tigers	10 April 2010, 7:30 pm	Dairy Farmers Stadium	Gavin Badger; Brett Suttor	16,273
Manly Warringah Sea Eagles	40 – 12	Cronulla-Sutherland Sharks	11 April 2010, 2:00 pm	Brookvale Oval	Tony Archer; Alan Shortall	16,055
Penrith Panthers	28 – 6	Sydney Roosters	11 April 2010, 3:00 pm	CUA Stadium	Jared Maxwell; Bernard Sutton	14,023
Parramatta Eels	14 – 24	Canberra Raiders	12 April 2010, 7:00 pm	Parramatta Stadium	Ben Cummins; Gerard Sutton	15,122

=== Round 6 ===
Home	Score	Away	Match Information
Home	Score	Away	Date and Time (Local)	Venue	Referees	Crowd
Gold Coast Titans	6 – 19	St. George Illawarra Dragons	16 April 2010, 7:35 pm	Skilled Park	Tony Archer; Jason Robinson	21,336
Wests Tigers	4 – 24	Canterbury-Bankstown Bulldogs	16 April 2010, 7:35 pm	Sydney Football Stadium	Jared Maxwell; Bernard Sutton	19,491
Newcastle Knights	36 – 18	North Queensland Cowboys	17 April 2010, 5:30pm	EnergyAustralia Stadium	Chris James; Ashley Klein	14,205
Sydney Roosters	36 – 6	Canberra Raiders	17 April 2010, 7:30pm	Sydney Football Stadium	Matt Cecchin; Steve Lyons	9,308
New Zealand Warriors	12 – 40	Penrith Panthers	18 April 2010, 2:00pm	Mt Smart Stadium	Gavin Badger; Brett Suttor	14,620
Brisbane Broncos	44 – 16	Cronulla-Sutherland Sharks	18 April 2010, 2:00pm	Suncorp Stadium	Tony De Las Heras; Jason Robinson	25,688
Parramatta Eels	22 – 8	South Sydney Rabbitohs	18 April 2010, 3:00pm	ANZ Stadium	Ben Cummins; Gerard Sutton	25,152
Melbourne Storm	16 – 18	Manly Warringah Sea Eagles	19 April 2010, 7:00pm	Etihad Stadium	Tony Archer; Alan Shortall	14,171

- Nathan Hindmarsh became the Parramatta Eels' most capped player, overtaking Brett Kenny by playing his 266th game.
- Glenn Stewart of the Manly Warringah Sea Eagles played his 100th club game.
- Luke Priddis played his 300th career match with the St. George Illawarra Dragons.
- The Melbourne Storm fell to its first defeat at Etihad Stadium since 2001.
- The Canberra Raiders' loss to the Roosters was their 12th successive defeat at the Sydney Football Stadium against that opposition, a record that stretches back to 1995.

=== Round 7 ===
Home	Score	Away	Match Information
Home	Score	Away	Date and Time (Local)	Venue	Referees	Crowd
Canterbury-Bankstown Bulldogs	36 – 18	Brisbane Broncos	23 April 2010, 7:35pm	ANZ Stadium	Gavin Badger; Jared Maxwell	17,014
North Queensland Cowboys	18 – 24	Parramatta Eels	23 April 2010, 7:35pm	Dairy Farmers Stadium	Tony De Las Heras; Jason Robinson	11,335
Penrith Panthers	26 – 18	Wests Tigers	24 April 2010, 5:30pm	CUA Stadium	Shayne Hayne; Chris James	19,220
Cronulla-Sutherland Sharks	26 – 6	Newcastle Knights	24 April 2010, 7:30pm	Toyota Stadium	Phil Haines; Ashley Klein	10,662
Canberra Raiders	24 – 26	South Sydney Rabbitohs	25 April 2010, 2:00pm	Canberra Stadium	Matt Cecchin; Steve Lyons	13,145
St. George Illawarra Dragons	28 – 6	Sydney Roosters	25 April 2010, 4:00pm	Sydney Football Stadium	Tony Archer; Alan Shortall	36,212
Melbourne Storm	40 – 6	New Zealand Warriors	25 April 2010, 6:00pm	Etihad Stadium	Gavin Badger; Brett Suttor	23,906
Manly Warringah Sea Eagles	22 – 24	Gold Coast Titans	26 April 2010, 7:00pm	Brookvale Oval	Jared Maxwell; Bernard Sutton	15,195

- From round 7, the Melbourne Storm will not be allowed to earn any further competition points for the rest of the 2010 season due to salary cap breaches.
- The Parramatta Eels won its first match at Dairy Farmers Stadium since 2000, whilst the South Sydney Rabbitohs won its first match in Canberra Stadium since 2005.

=== Round 8 ===
Home	Score	Away	Match Information
Home	Score	Away	Date and Time (Local)	Venue	Referees	Crowd
Parramatta Eels	26 – 10	Canterbury-Bankstown Bulldogs	30 April 2010, 7:35pm	ANZ Stadium	Tony Archer; Shayne Hayne	31,911
Brisbane Broncos	22 – 30	Newcastle Knights	30 April 2010, 7:35pm	Suncorp Stadium	Matt Cecchin; Steve Lyons	25,178
New Zealand Warriors	16 – 23	Canberra Raiders	1 May 2010, 5:00pm	Mt Smart Stadium	Ben Cummins; Adam Devcich	11,499
Gold Coast Titans	38 – 24	Penrith Panthers	1 May 2010, 5:30pm	Skilled Park	Jared Maxwell; Bernard Sutton	15,430
North Queensland Cowboys	6 – 34	Melbourne Storm	1 May 2010, 7:30pm	Dairy Farmers Stadium	Gavin Badger; Bernard Sutton	19,853
St. George Illawarra Dragons	38 – 0	Cronulla-Sutherland Sharks	1 May 2010, 7:30pm	WIN Stadium	Tony De Las Heras; Jason Robinson	15,779
Wests Tigers	8 – 12	Sydney Roosters	2 May 2010, 2:00pm	Campbelltown Stadium	Ashley Klein; Matt Cecchin	19,901
South Sydney Rabbitohs	22 – 30	Manly Warringah Sea Eagles	2 May 2010, 3:00pm	ANZ Stadium	Tony Archer; Alan Shortall	15,459

- This round Wests Tigers coach Tim Sheens became the first coach ever to reach 600 games.

=== Round 9 ===
Home	Score	Away	Match Information
Home	Score	Away	Date and Time (Local)	Venue	Referees	Crowd
Manly Warringah Sea Eagles	24 – 6	St. George Illawarra Dragons	8 May 2010, 7:30pm	Brookvale Oval	Gavin Badger; Shayne Hayne	16,745
Newcastle Knights	36 – 38	Gold Coast Titans	9 May 2010, 2:00pm	EnergyAustralia Stadium	Ben Cummins; Alan Shortall	13,384
Melbourne Storm	14 – 36	Brisbane Broncos	9 May 2010, 3:00pm	AAMI Park	Tony Archer; Steve Lyons	20,032
Sydney Roosters	14 – 32	North Queensland Cowboys	10 May 2010, 7:00pm	Sydney Football Stadium	Ashley Klein; Jason Robinson	6,478
BYE Round for: 8 teams - Canterbury-Bankstown Bulldogs, Canberra Raiders, Parramatta Eels, Penrith Panthers, Cronulla-Sutherland Sharks, South Sydney Rabbitohs, New Zealand Warriors & Wests Tigers .

- No club games were played on Friday night due to the 2010 ANZAC Test and City vs Country Origin representative matches being played on that day.
- The Gold Coast Titans won their first ever game at EnergyAustralia Stadium.
- The Brisbane Broncos became the first team to post a NRL victory at AAMI Park by defeating home team the Melbourne Storm. Their win was also the first in any Storm home ground (Olympic Park Stadium and Docklands Stadium) since 2003.

=== Round 10 - Heritage Round ===
Home	Score	Away	Match Information
Home	Score	Away	Date and Time (Local)	Venue	Referees	Crowd
Brisbane Broncos	28 – 6	Gold Coast Titans	14 May 2010, 7:35pm	Suncorp Stadium	Matt Cecchin; Shayne Hayne	40,168
Canterbury-Bankstown Bulldogs	6 – 19	St. George Illawarra Dragons	14 May 2010, 7:35pm	ANZ Stadium	Tony Archer; Bernard Sutton	37,773
Canberra Raiders	6 – 17	Melbourne Storm	15 May 2010, 7:30pm	Canberra Stadium	Ben Cummins; Chris James	12,165
New Zealand Warriors	24 – 12	North Queensland Cowboys	15 May 2010, 7:30pm	Mt Smart Stadium	Ashley Klein; Gerard Sutton	10,800
Sydney Roosters	18 – 34	Newcastle Knights	15 May 2010, 7:30pm	Bluetongue Stadium	Gavin Badger; Adam Devcich	10,018
Wests Tigers	10 – 50	South Sydney Rabbitohs	16 May 2010, 2:00pm	Sydney Cricket Ground	Tony De Las Heras; Steve Lyons	30,685
Cronulla-Sutherland Sharks	14 – 34	Penrith Panthers	16 May 2010, 3:00pm	Toyota Stadium	Jason Robinson; Brett Suttor	10,352
Manly Warringah Sea Eagles	12 – 19	Parramatta Eels	17 May 2010, 7:00pm	Brookvale Oval	Matt Cecchin; Jared Maxwell	11,023

- The South Sydney Rabbitohs recorded their biggest win at the Sydney Cricket Ground.

=== Round 11 ===
Home	Score	Away	Match Information
Home	Score	Away	Date and Time (Local)	Venue	Referees	Crowd
Newcastle Knights	6 – 23	Wests Tigers	21 May 2010, 7:35pm	EnergyAustralia Stadium	Jason Robinson; Alan Shortall	14,458
Parramatta Eels	18 – 22	Cronulla-Sutherland Sharks	22 May 2010, 7:30pm	Parramatta Stadium	Jared Maxwell; Brett Suttor	13,058
St. George Illawarra Dragons	14 – 22	Canberra Raiders	23 May 2010, 3:00pm	WIN Stadium	Tony De Las Heras; Steve Lyons	14,728
New Zealand Warriors	26 – 24	South Sydney Rabbitohs	23 May 2010, 4:00pm	Mt Smart Stadium	Gavin Badger; Gerard Sutton	10,485
Penrith Panthers	31 – 16	Canterbury-Bankstown Bulldogs	24 May 2010, 7:00pm	CUA Stadium	Matt Cecchin; Ben Cummins	11,278
BYE Round for: 6 teams - Brisbane Broncos, North Queensland Cowboys, Manly Warringah Sea Eagles, Melbourne Storm, Sydney Roosters & Gold Coast Titans.

- Players selected for Game One of the 2010 State of Origin series were unavailable to play NRL matches for this round.

=== Round 12 ===
Home	Score	Away	Match Information
Home	Score	Away	Date and Time (Local)	Venue	Referees	Crowd
St. George Illawarra Dragons	30 – 0	Parramatta Eels	28 May 2010, 7:35pm	WIN Jubilee Oval	Ben Cummins; Jared Maxwell	15,068
Wests Tigers	50 – 6	New Zealand Warriors	28 May 2010, 7:35pm	Campbelltown Stadium	Tony De Las Heras; Steve Lyons	10,061
Cronulla-Sutherland Sharks	4 – 20	Brisbane Broncos	29 May 2010, 5:30pm	Toyota Stadium	Gavin Badger; Gerard Sutton	7,826
North Queensland Cowboys	20 – 24	Manly Warringah Sea Eagles	29 May 2010, 7:30pm	Dairy Farmers Stadium	Jason Robinson; Alan Shortall	13,538
Melbourne Storm	23 – 12	Canterbury-Bankstown Bulldogs	30 May 2010, 2:00pm	AAMI Park	Shayne Hayne; Ashley Klein	12,420
South Sydney Rabbitohs	42 – 22	Penrith Panthers	30 May 2010, 3:00pm	ANZ Stadium	Tony Archer; Bernard Sutton	11,108
Gold Coast Titans	16 – 30	Sydney Roosters	31 May 2010, 7:00pm	Skilled Park	Jarred Maxwell; Steve Lyons	13,235
BYE Round for: 2 teams - Canberra Raiders & Newcastle Knights.

- The Sydney Roosters ended their losing streak against Gold Coast Titans, having not beaten them since the 2007 NRL Season.

=== Round 13 ===
Home	Score	Away	Match Information
Home	Score	Away	Date and Time (Local)	Venue	Referees	Crowd
Canterbury-Bankstown Bulldogs	12 – 19	Wests Tigers	4 June 2010, 7:35pm	ANZ Stadium	Shayne Hayne; Alan Shortall	11,837
Parramatta Eels	24 – 10	Melbourne Storm	4 June 2010, 7:35pm	Parramatta Stadium	Tony Archer; Gerard Sutton	7,572
Penrith Panthers	28 – 10	Newcastle Knights	5 June 2010, 5:30pm	CUA Stadium	Jason Robinson; Brett Suttor	10,969
Sydney Roosters	18 – 42	Cronulla-Sutherland Sharks	5 June 2010, 7:30pm	Sydney Football Stadium	Ben Cummins; Tony De Las Heras	7,934
Canberra Raiders	28 – 24	Gold Coast Titans	6 June 2010, 2:00pm	Canberra Stadium	Gavin Badger; Phil Haines	10,425
New Zealand Warriors	20 – 22	St. George Illawarra Dragons	6 June 2010, 2:00pm	Mt Smart Stadium	Ashley Klein; Bernard Sutton	8,312
Manly Warringah Sea Eagles	6 – 22	Brisbane Broncos	6 June 2010, 3:00pm	Brookvale Oval	Jared Maxwell; Chris James	11,316
South Sydney Rabbitohs	32 – 4	North Queensland Cowboys	7 June 2010, 7:00pm	ANZ Stadium	Matt Cecchin; Steve Lyons	9,688

=== Round 14 ===
Home	Score	Away	Match Information
Home	Score	Away	Date and Time (Local)	Venue	Referees	Crowd
Gold Coast Titans	28 – 14	Manly Warringah Sea Eagles	11 June 2010, 7:35pm	Skilled Park	Gavin Badger; Ben Cummins	17,508
North Queensland Cowboys	16 – 8	Canberra Raiders	12 June 2010, 7:30pm	Dairy Farmers Stadium	Matt Cecchin; Gerard Sutton	12,058
Newcastle Knights	24 – 32	New Zealand Warriors	13 June 2010, 2:00pm	EnergyAustralia Stadium	Tony De Las Heras; Steve Lyons	10,535
Brisbane Broncos	50 – 22	South Sydney Rabbitohs	13 June 2010, 3:00pm	Suncorp Stadium	Jared Maxwell; Brett Suttor	30,311
Melbourne Storm	6 – 38	Sydney Roosters	14 June 2010, 7:00pm	AAMI Park	Ashley Klein; Bernard Sutton	10,449
BYE Round for: 6 teams - Canterbury-Bankstown Bulldogs, St. George Illawarra Dragons, Parramatta Eels, Penrith Panthers, Cronulla-Sutherland Sharks & Wests Tigers.

- Players selected for Game Two of the 2010 State of Origin series were unavailable to play NRL matches for this round.

=== Round 15 ===
Home	Score	Away	Match Information
Home	Score	Away	Date and Time (Local)	Venue	Referees	Crowd
Brisbane Broncos	12 – 22	Penrith Panthers	18 June 2010, 7:00pm	Suncorp Stadium (DH)	Gavin Badger; Brett Suttor	42,233
Canterbury-Bankstown Bulldogs	24 – 25	Gold Coast Titans	18 June 2010, 8:45pm	Suncorp Stadium (DH)	Tony De Las Heras; Steve Lyons	42,233
Melbourne Storm	58 – 12	North Queensland Cowboys	19 June 2010, 5:30pm	AAMI Park	Ben Cummins; Bernard Sutton	10,661
Manly Warringah Sea Eagles	26 – 25	South Sydney Rabbitohs	19 June 2010, 7:30pm	Brookvale Oval	Shayne Hanye; Jason Robinson	11,661
Cronulla-Sutherland Sharks	4 – 22	St. George Illawarra Dragons	20 June 2010, 2:00pm	Toyota Stadium	Tony Archer; Alan Shortall	16,773
Wests Tigers	18 – 8	Canberra Raiders	20 June 2010, 3:00pm	Leichhardt Oval	Ashley Klein; Jared Maxwell	19,428
Newcastle Knights	6 – 4	Parramatta Eels	21 June 2010, 7:00pm	EnergyAustralia Stadium	Gavin Badger; Matt Cecchin	8,474
BYE Round for: 2 teams - New Zealand Warriors & Sydney Roosters.

- Beau Ryan recorded the milestone of 1000 tries for the Wests Tigers.
- Brett Finch of the Melbourne Storm played his 250th first grade game.

=== Round 16 - Women in League Round ===
Home	Score	Away	Match Information
Home	Score	Away	Date and Time (Local)	Venue	Referees	Crowd
Penrith Panthers	40 – 22	Manly Warringah Sea Eagles	25 June 2010, 7:35pm	CUA Stadium	Tony Archer; Tony De Las Heras	14,978
St. George Illawarra Dragons	34 – 10	Wests Tigers	25 June 2010, 7:35pm	WIN Jubilee Oval	Shayne Hayne; Jason Robinson	16,574
Parramatta Eels	6 – 10	Brisbane Broncos	26 June 2010, 5:30pm	Parramatta Stadium	Jarred Maxwell; Phil Haines	15,929
North Queensland Cowboys	19 – 20	Cronulla-Sutherland Sharks	26 June 2010, 7:30pm	Dairy Farmers Stadium	Gavin Badger; Brett Suttor	13,063
South Sydney Rabbitohs	16 – 14	Melbourne Storm	26 June 2010, 7:30pm	Perth Oval	Ashley Klein; Matt Cecchin	13,164
Gold Coast Titans	16 – 24	Newcastle Knights	27 June 2010, 3:00pm	Skilled Park	Steve Lyons; Alan Shortall	13,396
Sydney Roosters	18 – 20	New Zealand Warriors	27 June 2010, 4:00pm	AMI Stadium	Ben Cummins; Gerard Sutton	20,721
Canberra Raiders	10 – 18	Canterbury-Bankstown Bulldogs	28 June 2010, 7:00pm	Canberra Stadium	Shayne Hayne; Chris James	11,194

- Darren Lockyer reached 329 club games to achieve an individual record for the most club games at a single club and overtook Andrew Ettingshausen to become sixth for most club games played.
- The St. George Illawarra Dragons played their 300th premiership match.
- The Cronulla Sharks' golden point extra-time victory over the Cowboys equalled their greatest comeback in their club's history, coming from 18–0 down at halftime to achieve a 19–20 victory.
- The South Sydney Rabbitohs defeated the Melbourne Storm for the first time since 2004.
- The New Zealand Warriors won its first New Zealand match outside of Auckland since 2006.

=== Round 17 ===
Home	Score	Away	Match Information
Home	Score	Away	Date and Time (Local)	Venue	Referees	Crowd
Brisbane Broncos	14 – 16	Wests Tigers	2 July 2010, 7:35pm	Suncorp Stadium	Matt Cecchin; Ben Cummins	30,127
Cronulla-Sutherland Sharks	12 – 24	Canterbury-Bankstown Bulldogs	3 July 2010, 7:30pm	Bluetongue Stadium	Jason Robinson; Alan Shortall	9,826
Canberra Raiders	12 – 22	Sydney Roosters	4 July 2010, 2:00pm	Canberra Stadium	Tony De Las Heras; Steve Lyons	10,767
New Zealand Warriors	35 – 6	Parramatta Eels	4 July 2010, 4:00pm	Mt Smart Stadium	Gavin Badger; Ashley Klein	9,912
St. George Illawarra Dragons	8 – 12	Penrith Panthers	5 July 2010, 7:00pm	WIN Jubilee Oval	Jared Maxwell; Brett Suttor	12,974
BYE Round for: 6 teams - Gold Coast Titans, Manly Warringah Sea Eagles, Melbourne Storm, Newcastle Knights, North Queensland Cowboys, South Sydney Rabbitohs.

- Players selected for Game Three of the 2010 State of Origin series were unavailable to play NRL matches for this round.
- Nathan Cayless of the Parramatta Eels played his 250th club game.
- The Wests Tigers defeated the Brisbane Broncos for the first time since 2006.
- The Penrith Panthers recorded just its third win overall at WIN Jubilee Oval.

=== Round 18 ===
Home	Score	Away	Match Information
Home	Score	Away	Date and Time (Local)	Venue	Referees	Crowd
Sydney Roosters	18 – 14	South Sydney Rabbitohs	9 July 2010, 7:35pm	Sydney Football Stadium	Jason Robinson; Alan Shortall	18,424
Wests Tigers	15 – 14	Gold Coast Titans	9 July 2010, 7:35pm	Campbelltown Stadium	Gavin Badger; Ashley Klein	14,050
Manly Warringah Sea Eagles	22 – 24	Canberra Raiders	10 July 2010, 5:30pm	Brookvale Oval	Ben Cummins; Brett Suttor	10,027
Canterbury-Bankstown Bulldogs	20 – 18	Melbourne Storm	10 July 2010, 7:30pm	Adelaide Oval	Matt Cecchin; Tony De Las Heras	10,350
Newcastle Knights	21 – 10	Cronulla-Sutherland Sharks	11 July 2010, 2:00pm	EnergyAustralia Stadium	Tony Archer; Gerard Sutton	12,909
Penrith Panthers	6 – 12	New Zealand Warriors	11 July 2010, 3:00pm	CUA Stadium	Shayne Hayne; Chris James	9,983
Parramatta Eels	36 – 24	North Queensland Cowboys	12 July 2010, 7:00pm	Parramatta Stadium	Ashley Klein; Jared Maxwell	11,177
BYE Round for: 2 teams - Brisbane Broncos & St. George Illawarra Dragons.

=== Round 19 - Rivalry Round ===
Home	Score	Away	Match Information
Home	Score	Away	Date and Time (Local)	Venue	Referees	Crowd
Gold Coast Titans	10 – 24	Brisbane Broncos	16 July 2010, 7:35pm	Skilled Park	Jason Robinson; Matt Cecchin	26,197
South Sydney Rabbitohs	13 – 16	St. George Illawarra Dragons	16 July 2010, 7:35pm	ANZ Stadium	Shayne Hayne; Chris James	22,238
Cronulla-Sutherland Sharks	18 – 48	Manly Warringah Sea Eagles	17 July 2010, 7:30pm	Toyota Stadium	Jared Maxwell; Åland Shortall	8,863
New Zealand Warriors	13 – 6	Melbourne Storm	17 July 2010, 7:30pm	Mt Smart Stadium	Steve Lyons; Gerard Sutton	13,118
Penrith Panthers	28 – 34	Parramatta Eels	17 July 2010, 7:30pm	CUA Stadium	Ben Cummins; Brett Suttor	22,582
Canberra Raiders	52 – 18	Newcastle Knights	18 July 2010, 2:00pm	Canberra Stadium	Jason Robinson; Ashley Klein	9,459
Sydney Roosters	36 – 32	Canterbury-Bankstown Bulldogs	18 July 2010, 3:00pm	Sydney Football Stadium	Gavin Badger; Tony De Las Heras	19,121
Wests Tigers	26 – 16	North Queensland Cowboys	19 July 2010, 7:00pm	Leichhardt Oval	Shayne Hayne; Matt Cecchin	11,364

- Brett Kimmorley and Braith Anasta played their 300th and 200th games respectively.
- The match between the Penrith Panthers and the Parramatta Eels recorded a CUA Stadium attendance record of 22,582.

=== Round 20 ===
Home	Score	Away	Match Information
Home	Score	Away	Date and Time (Local)	Venue	Referees	Crowd
Canterbury-Bankstown Bulldogs	16 – 32	Parramatta Eels	23 July 2010, 7:35pm	ANZ Stadium	Tony Archer; Gavin Badger	34,662
St. George Illawarra Dragons	10 – 11	Gold Coast Titans	23 July 2010, 7:35pm	WIN Jubilee Oval	Ben Cummins; Tony De Las Heras	12,668
Canberra Raiders	20 – 13	Cronulla-Sutherland Sharks	24 July 2010, 5:30pm	Canberra Stadium	Matt Cecchin; Ashley Klein	9,280
Melbourne Storm	18 – 10	Penrith Panthers	24 July 2010, 7:30pm	AAMI Park	Jason Robinson; Brett Suttor	11,212
North Queensland Cowboys	28 – 24	Newcastle Knights	24 July 2010, 7:30pm	Dairy Farmers Stadium	Chris James; Steve Lyons	12,146
South Sydney Rabbitohs	38 – 28	New Zealand Warriors	25 July 2010, 2:00pm	ANZ Stadium	Gavin Badger; Tony De Las Heras	13,895
Manly Warringah Sea Eagles	38 – 20	Wests Tigers	25 July 2010, 3:00pm	Bluetongue Stadium	Shayne Hayne; Gerard Sutton	20,059
Brisbane Broncos	30 – 34	Sydney Roosters	26 July 2010, 7:00pm	Suncorp Stadium	Tony Archer; Alan Shortall	26,486

- The Gold Coast Titans became the first Gold Coast franchise to ever win at Jubilee Oval.
- The match between Wests Tigers and Manly Warringah Sea Eagles at Bluetongue Stadium equaled the attendance record for the second time, being at full capacity.

=== Round 21 ===
Home	Score	Away	Match Information
Home	Score	Away	Date and Time (Local)	Venue	Referees	Crowd
Canterbury-Bankstown Bulldogs	32 – 12	South Sydney Rabbitohs	30 July 2010, 7:35pm	ANZ Stadium	Matt Cecchin; Jared Maxwell	15,312
Penrith Panthers	24 – 16	North Queensland Cowboys	30 July 2010, 7:35pm	CUA Stadium	Tony De Las Heras; Steve Lyons	7,080
Parramatta Eels	12 – 48	Sydney Roosters	31 July 2010, 5:30pm	Parramatta Stadium	Shayne Hayne; Gerard Sutton	19,824
Wests Tigers	24 – 22	Cronulla-Sutherland Sharks	31 July 2010, 7:30pm	Leichhardt Oval	Jason Robinson; Brett Suttor	14,942
Melbourne Storm	36 – 12	Canberra Raiders	1 August 2010, 2:00pm	AAMI Park	Ben Cummins; Phil Haines	9,112
New Zealand Warriors	20 – 28	Gold Coast Titans	1 August 2010, 2:00pm	Mt Smart Stadium	Tony Archer; Alan Shortall	12,017
Brisbane Broncos	10 – 6	St. George Illawarra Dragons	1 August 2010, 3:00pm	Suncorp Stadium	Gavin Badger; Ashley Klein	42,269
Newcastle Knights	32 – 14	Manly Warringah Sea Eagles	2 August 2010, 7:00pm	EnergyAustralia Stadium	Matt Cecchin; Jared Maxwell	14,267

- Anthony Minichiello of the Sydney Roosters played his 200th NRL game.
- Jamie Soward of the St. George Illawarra Dragons played his 100th NRL game.

=== Round 22 ===
Home	Score	Away	Match Information
Home	Score	Away	Date and Time (Local)	Venue	Referees	Crowd
Gold Coast Titans	34 – 12	Parramatta Eels	6 August 2010, 7:35pm	Skilled Park	Gavin Badger; Tony De Las Heras	19,568
North Queensland Cowboys	26 – 34	Brisbane Broncos	6 August 2010, 7:35pm	Dairy Farmers Stadium	Ben Cummins; Gerard Sutton	20,148
Manly Warringah Sea Eagles	26 – 6	Melbourne Storm	7 August 2010, 5:30pm	Brookvale Oval	Matt Cecchin; Brett Suttor	12,550
Cronulla-Sutherland Sharks	10 – 37	New Zealand Warriors	7 August 2010, 7:30pm	Toyota Stadium	Chris James; Steve Lyons	7,510
South Sydney Rabbitohs	34 – 30	Wests Tigers	7 August 2010, 7:30pm	ANZ Stadium	Jared Maxwell; Jason Robinson	23,298
Newcastle Knights	30 – 6	Canterbury-Bankstown Bulldogs	8 August 2010, 2:00pm	EnergyAustralia Stadium	Gavin Badger; Ashley Kevin	17,316
Sydney Roosters	12 – 19	St. George Illawarra Dragons	8 August 2010, 3:00pm	Sydney Cricket Ground	Tony Archer; Alan Shortall	37,994
Canberra Raiders	30 – 26	Penrith Panthers	9 August 2010, 7:00pm	Canberra Stadium	Ben Cummins; Phil Haines	8,850

- Brad Tighe of the Penrith Panthers played his 100th game.

=== Round 23 ===
Home	Score	Away	Match Information
Home	Score	Away	Date and Time (Local)	Venue	Referees	Crowd
Brisbane Broncos	14 – 30	Parramatta Eels	13 August 2010, 7:35pm	Suncorp Stadium	Tony Archer; Alan Shortall	38,193
Cronulla-Sutherland Sharks	18 – 12	Sydney Roosters	13 August 2010, 7:35pm	Toyota Stadium	Matt Cecchin; Tony De Las Heras	8,911
Gold Coast Titans	37 – 18	North Queensland Cowboys	14 August 2010, 5:30pm	Skilled Park	Jason Robinson; Ashley Klein	14,032
Canterbury-Bankstown Bulldogs	14 – 28	Canberra Raiders	14 August 2010, 7:30pm	ANZ Stadium	Jared Maxwell; Brett Suttor	10,116
Melbourne Storm	18 – 16	South Sydney Rabbitohs	15 August 2010, 2:00pm	AAMI Park	Steve Lyons; Chris James	9,172
New Zealand Warriors	22 – 10	Newcastle Knights	15 August 2010, 2:00pm	Mt Smart Stadium	Ben Cummins; Gerard Sutton	12,824
Wests Tigers	43 – 18	Penrith Panthers	15 August 2010, 3:00pm	Campbelltown Stadium	Tony Archer; Gavin Badger	17,208
St. George Illawarra Dragons	32 – 10	Manly Warringah Sea Eagles	16 August 2010, 7:00pm	WIN Jubilee Oval	Matt Cecchin; Shayne Hayne	14,740

- Shane Flanagan won his first game as replacement coach for the Cronulla Sharks.
- Nathan Merritt of the South Sydney Rabbitohs recorded 100 career tries.
- The Penrith Panthers lost its first match at Campbelltown Stadium since 1996.

=== Round 24 ===
Home	Score	Away	Match Information
Home	Score	Away	Date and Time (Local)	Venue	Referees	Crowd
Newcastle Knights	44 – 18	Brisbane Broncos	20 August 2010, 7:35pm	EnergyAustralia Stadium	Gavin Badger; Ben Cummins	16,668
Penrith Panthers	54 – 18	South Sydney Rabbitohs	20 August 2010, 7:35pm	CUA Stadium	Tony Archer; Alan Shortall	13,411
Manly Warringah Sea Eagles	19 – 16	New Zealand Warriors	21 August 2010, 5:30pm	Brookvale Oval	Steve Lyons; Jared Maxwell	13,095
Melbourne Storm	24 – 4	Cronulla-Sutherland Sharks	21 August 2010, 7:30pm	AAMI Park	Ashley Klein; Luke Phillips	8,902
North Queensland Cowboys	20 – 22	Canterbury-Bankstown Bulldogs	21 August 2010, 7:30pm	Dairy Farmers Stadium	Gavin Reynolds; Jason Robinson	11,742
Canberra Raiders	32 – 16	St. George Illawarra Dragons	22 August 2010, 2:00pm	Canberra Stadium	Matt Cecchin; Tony De Las Heras	20,445
Parramatta Eels	18 – 20	Wests Tigers	22 August 2010, 3:00pm	Parramatta Stadium	Shayne Hayne; Ben Cummins	19,854
Sydney Roosters	14 – 23	Gold Coast Titans	23 August 2010, 7:00pm	Sydney Football Stadium	Gavin Badger; Steve Lyons	9,113

- Anthony Minichiello of the Sydney Roosters recorded 100 career tries.
- Cooper Vuna of the Newcastle Knights recorded four tries against the Broncos to equal with Andrew Johns, Adam Macdougall and Darren Albert for the club record of most tries scored by a player in a match.
- Michael Gordon of the Penrith Panthers scored 30 points (3 tries, 9 goals) against the Rabbitohs to surpass Ryan Girdler for the club record of most points in a match by a player.

=== Round 25 ===
Home	Score	Away	Match Information
Home	Score	Away	Date and Time (Local)	Venue	Referees	Crowd
South Sydney Rabbitohs	24 – 16	Parramatta Eels	27 August 2010, 7:35pm	ANZ Stadium	Matt Cecchin; Ben Cummins	19,098
New Zealand Warriors	36 – 4	Brisbane Broncos	27 August 2010, 8:05pm	Mt Smart Stadium	Tony De Las Heras; Jared Maxwell	21,627
Cronulla-Sutherland Sharks	30 – 16	Gold Coast Titans	28 August 2010, 5:30pm	Toyota Park	Chris James; Jason Robinson	10,116
Canberra Raiders	48 – 4	North Queensland Cowboys	28 August 2010, 7:30pm	Canberra Stadium	Ashley Klein; Brett Suttor	11,434
Newcastle Knights	18 – 26	St. George Illawarra Dragons	28 August 2010, 7:30pm	EnergyAustralia Stadium	Shayne Hayne; Gerard Sutton	23,148
Wests Tigers	26 – 14	Melbourne Storm	29 August 2010, 2:00pm	Leichhardt Oval	Gavin Badger; Alan Shortall	20,168
Sydney Roosters	30 – 14	Manly Warringah Sea Eagles	29 August 2010, 3:00pm	Sydney Football Stadium	Tony Archer; Matt Cecchin	18,962
Canterbury-Bankstown Bulldogs	18 – 24	Penrith Panthers	30 August 2010, 7:00pm	ANZ Stadium	Tony De Las Heras; Steve Lyons	13,794

- Adam MacDougall of the Newcastle Knights broke his club's all-time individual tryscoring record, surpassing Timana Tahu with 83 tries.
- Canberra Raiders' captain Alan Tongue played his 200th first grade game.
- Petero Civoniceva became the first (and only) player to be sent off this season and the first captain since the NRL's inception in 1998 to be sent off.

=== Round 26 ===
Home	Score	Away	Match Information
Home	Score	Away	Date and Time (Local)	Venue	Referees	Crowd
Brisbane Broncos	16 – 18	Canberra Raiders	3 September 2010, 7:35pm	Suncorp Stadium	Jared Maxwell; Gerard Sutton	38,872
Gold Coast Titans	21 – 18	Wests Tigers	3 September 2010, 7:35pm	Skilled Park	Tony Archer; Gavin Badger	26,103
Parramatta Eels	12 – 26	New Zealand Warriors	4 September 2010, 5:30pm	Parramatta Stadium	Matt Cecchin; Tony De Las Heras	11,383
North Queensland Cowboys	8 – 18	Sydney Roosters	4 September 2010, 7:30pm	Dairy Farmers Stadium	Steve Lyons; Brett Suttor	12,033
Penrith Panthers	50 – 12	Cronulla-Sutherland Sharks	4 September 2010, 7:30pm	CUA Stadium	Chris James; Jason Robinson	10,997
Melbourne Storm	34 – 4	Newcastle Knights	5 September 2010, 2:00pm	AAMI Park	Ashley Klein; Gavin Morris	20,517
Manly Warringah Sea Eagles	24 – 30	Canterbury-Bankstown Bulldogs	5 September 2010, 3:00pm	Brookvale Oval	Gavin Badger; Shayne Hayne	15,933
St. George Illawarra Dragons	38 – 24	South Sydney Rabbitohs	5 September 2010, 7:00pm	WIN Jubilee Oval	Ben Cummins; Alan Shortall	18,274

- Matthew Bowen of the North Queensland Cowboys played his 200th club game.
- Matt Cooper of the St. George Illawarra Dragons recorded 100 career tries.
- The Canberra Raiders won its first match at Suncorp Stadium since 2004 and the first in Queensland since 2006.
- The Brisbane Broncos will miss the finals series for the first time since 1991.
- Parramatta Legend Nathan Cayless played his final game in the NRL due to his retirement. He holds the record for most games as captain in the NRL.

== Finals series ==
Qualifying finals
1	St. George Illawarra	28
8	Manly	0
2	Penrith	22
7	Canberra	24
3	Wests	15
6	Sydney	19
4	Gold Coast	28
5	New Zealand	16

Semifinals
4W	Canberra	24
2L	Wests	26
3W	Sydney	34
1L	Penrith	12

Preliminary finals
1W	St. George Illawarra	13
Wests	12
2W	Gold Coast	6
Sydney	32

Final
St. George Illawarra	32
Sydney	8

=== Qualifying finals ===
Home	Score	Away	Match Information
Home	Score	Away	Date and Time (Local)	Venue	Referees	Crowd
Gold Coast Titans	28 – 16	New Zealand Warriors	10 September 2010, 7:35pm	Skilled Park	Gavin Badger; Tony Archer	27,026
Wests Tigers	15 – 19	Sydney Roosters (details)	11 September 2010, 6:30pm	Sydney Football Stadium	Matt Cecchin; Shayne Hayne	33,315
Penrith Panthers	22 – 24	Canberra Raiders	11 September 2010, 8:30pm	CUA Stadium	Ben Cummins; Steve Lyons	16,668
St. George Illawarra Dragons	28 – 0	Manly Warringah Sea Eagles	12 September 2010, 4:00pm	WIN Jubilee Oval	Jared Maxwell; Jason Robinson	15,574
Eliminated: New Zealand Warriors, Manly Warringah Sea Eagles

- By defeating the Warriors, the Gold Coast Titans achieved their first finals victory.
- Manu Vatuvei of the New Zealand Warriors broke his club's all-time try scoring record, surpassing Stacey Jones with 78 tries.
- Matt Cooper of the St. George Illawarra Dragons broke his club's all-time try scoring record, surpassing Nathan Blacklock with 102 tries.
- The match between the Wests Tigers and Sydney Roosters became the first finals match to be decided in golden point extra-time since its introduction in 2003, with the game taking 100 minutes before being decided. It was the Roosters first win in a finals series since 2004 and the Wests Tigers first ever finals loss.
- The Canberra Raiders achieved their first finals victory since 2000, coincidentally against the Panthers, whilst the St. George Illawarra Dragons achieved their first since 2006, again coincidentally against the same opposition and by the same score of 28–0.

==== 2nd qualifying final ====
2010 NRL Second Qualifying Final
Wests Tigers	Sydney Roosters
15	19
	1	2	Total
WST	10	5	15
SYD	2	13 (4)	19
- Date: 11 September 2010
- Stadium: Sydney Football Stadium
- Location: Sydney, NSW, Australia
- Referees: Shayne Hayne, Matt Cecchin
- Attendance: 33,315

Broadcast partners
- Broadcasters: Nine Network
- Commentators: Ray Warren; Peter Sterling; Phil Gould

The 2010 NRL Second Qualifying Final was a rugby league match contested between the Wests Tigers and Sydney Roosters in the first week of the 2010 NRL finals series on 11 September 2010. The match is notable as it was the first finals match to be played under the golden point rule since it was introduced in 2003. The match was hailed as "one of the greatest matches in recent memory".

===== Background =====
Both the Sydney Roosters and Wests Tigers had qualified for the NRL finals series, held annually during September of every NRL season, after varying absences: the Roosters had finished last in 2009 after reaching the finals in 2008, whilst the Tigers had not reached the finals since winning the premiership in 2005. The Tigers recorded their best ever regular season by winning 15 of its 24 matches and finishing third on the ladder, both surpassing the previous records set in 2005, whilst the Roosters won 14 of their 24 matches to finish sixth at the end of the regular season.

The McIntyre final eight system, which was in place at the time, meant that the two teams were to be drawn against each other in the first week of the finals. The Roosters had won both of their meetings in the regular season, by 12 points in Round 2 and by four points in Round 8.

===== Match details =====
====== Team lists ======
Wests Tigers	Position	Sydney Roosters
Mitch Brown	Fullback	Anthony Minichiello
Lote Tuqiri	Wing	Phil Graham
Blake Ayshford	Centre	Kane Linnett
Geoff Daniela	Centre	Shaun Kenny-Dowall
Beau Ryan	Wing	Sam Perrett
Benji Marshall	Five-eighth	Todd Carney
Robert Lui	Halfback	Mitchell Pearce
Bryce Gibbs	Prop	Jason Ryles
Robbie Farah (captain)	Hooker	James Aubusson
Keith Galloway	Prop	Frank-Paul Nu'uausala
Todd Payten	2nd Row	Braith Anasta (captain)
Gareth Ellis	2nd Row	Mitchell Aubusson
Chris Heighington	Lock	Nate Myles
Liam Fulton	Interchange	Jake Friend
Andrew Fifita	Interchange	Martin Kennedy
Simon Dwyer	Interchange	Jared Waerea-Hargreaves
Ben Murdoch-Masila	Interchange	Daniel Conn
Tim Sheens	Coach	Brian Smith

====== 1st half ======
The Tigers had three chances, through Gareth Ellis, to score the first try of the match within the first 13 minutes, however, on each occasion, he was denied: first after Todd Carney had dislodged the ball from his hands, the second after he was held up over the line by some desperate Roosters defence, and the third after Benji Marshall was penalised for an off-the-ball incident with Mitchell Pearce. They were, however, the most dominant team of the first half, scoring two tries, through Lote Tuqiri and Beau Ryan, to the Roosters' sole penalty goal (kicked by Carney), and taking a 10–2 lead into half-time.

Ellis was placed on report in the 18th minute for a high shot on Carney; he subsequently escaped any judiciary sanction over the incident.

====== 2nd half ======
Blake Ayshford scored first for the Tigers eight minutes into the second half, and, following by a field goal by captain Robbie Farah soon after, the Tigers' lead had stretched to 15–2, and it appeared the match was won. However, the Roosters would score two converted tries, both set up by Todd Carney for captain Braith Anasta and Mitchell Pearce, to narrow the margin to 15–14 with less than ten minutes left to play in regular time.

Simon Dwyer later appeared to win the match for the Tigers with two minutes remaining when he hit Jared Waerea-Hargreaves hard in the 78th minute of play, thus dislodging the ball from the latter's hands. This won the Tigers a scrum feed inside the Roosters' half, however, after Benji Marshall had fed the scrum, the Roosters pounced on the loose ball, giving them one last chance to win the match in the final minute. After initially trying to go for a match winning try, the ball found the hands of Braith Anasta, who kicked the match-tying field goal with mere seconds left, to send the match into golden point extra time.

====== Golden point period ======
For the first time since golden point was introduced by the NRL in 2003, a finals match was to be decided by golden point. Whereas in a regular season match the final result would be a draw after neither team scored in ten minutes of golden point, in finals matches, the match goes on for an indefinite period until any team scored through any method (try, penalty goal, field goal).

Following a scoreless first five minutes of extra time, play continued indefinitely during which Robbie Farah, Todd Carney and Mitchell Pearce all missed attempted field goal shots until Shaun Kenny-Dowall was able to intercept a Liam Fulton pass and run sixty metres to score the match winning try in the 100th minute of the match, thus completing one of the greatest comebacks in Roosters history, winning the match 19–15.

====== Summary ======
15	Wests Tigers
Tries	1 Tuqiri (30'); 1 Ryan (37'); 1 Ayshford (50')
Goals	1/3 B Marshall 1/3 (30')
Field goals	1 Robbie Farah (54')
19	Sydney Roosters
Tries	1 Anasta (61'); 1 Pearce (75'); 1 Kenny-Dowall (101')
Goals	3/4 Carney (20' pen, 62', 76')^{1}
Field goals	1 Braith Anasta (80')
Half Time	Tigers 10–2
Score Progression	20th: Roosters 2–0 (Penalty goal: Carney); 30th: Tigers 6–2 (Try: Tuqiri, Goal: Marshall); 37th: Tigers 10–2 (Try: Ryan); 50th: Tigers 14–2 (Try: Ayshford); 54th: Tigers 15–2 (Field goal: Farah); 61st: Tigers 15–8 (Try: Anasta, Goal: Carney); 75th: Tigers 15–14 (Try: Pearce, Goal: Carney); 80th: Tied 15–all (Field goal: Anasta); 101st: Roosters 19–15 (Try: Kenny-Dowall)

^{1} No conversion on goal was required following Kenny-Dowall's try, as golden point rules stipulate that a try scored in golden point is not needed to be converted.

===== Legacy =====
In a match which pitted two of the game's entertainers (Benji Marshall and Todd Carney) up against each other, the match did not disappoint. It has been remembered as "one of the greatest Roosters victories of all time", as well as "one of the most epic matches in recent times". In particular, the final five minutes in regular time proved to be the most dramatic of the match, whereby Benji Marshall left the field injured, leaving the Tigers with only 12 men. The Tigers had failed to capitalise on a Roosters error with two minutes remaining in the match, allowing the Roosters to kick the match-levelling field goal in the final seconds of regular time, sending the match into extra time, which was remembered by many for its nail-biting finish.

===== Teams' subsequent schedules =====
The result of this match, and the format of the final eight system, meant that the Tigers would only survive in the finals series if at least one of the two higher-ranked teams (St. George Illawarra or Penrith) won their respective qualifying final ties against the Sea Eagles and the Raiders. The Panthers' loss to the Raiders left the Tigers at risk of an early elimination, however they survived after the Dragons defeated the Sea Eagles in their qualifying final. They were then drawn against the Canberra Raiders, the lowest-ranked of the qualifying final winners, in a match that was to be played at Canberra Stadium.

The Tigers narrowly defeated Canberra by 26–24, thus progressing them to the preliminary finals, where they were eventually defeated by the eventual premiers, St. George Illawarra, 13–12.

The Roosters were guaranteed to remain in the finals series, regardless of any other subsequent results. However, as the third-highest ranked of the four winning teams from the first weekend of the finals series, they had to play in the second week of the finals series; they were subsequently drawn against the Penrith Panthers, the highest-ranked loser from the qualifying finals. The Roosters won 34–12, to progress to the semi-finals, where they defeated the Gold Coast Titans by 26 points to eventually make the grand final. However, the finals series eventually took its toll on the Roosters and they were soundly beaten by the Dragons 32–8 in the premiership deciding match.=

=== Semi finals ===
Home	Score	Away	Match Information
Home	Score	Away	Date and Time	Venue	Referees	Crowd
Canberra Raiders	24 – 26	Wests Tigers	17 September 2010, 7:45pm	Canberra Stadium	Tony Archer; Jared Maxwell	26,476
Sydney Roosters	34 – 12	Penrith Panthers	18 September 2010, 7:35pm	Sydney Football Stadium	Shayne Hayne; Ben Cummins	23,459
Eliminated: Canberra Raiders, Penrith Panthers

- The Sydney Roosters and Penrith Panthers played each other for the first time in the finals since the 2003 NRL Grand Final.

=== Preliminary finals ===
Home	Score	Away	Match Information
Home	Score	Away	Date and Time	Venue	Referees	Crowd
Gold Coast Titans	6 – 32	Sydney Roosters	24 September 2010, 7:35pm	Suncorp Stadium	Tony Archer; Jared Maxwell	44,787
St. George Illawarra Dragons	13 – 12	Wests Tigers	25 September 2010, 7:35pm	ANZ Stadium	Shayne Hayne; Ben Cummins	71,212
Eliminated: Gold Coast Titans, Wests Tigers

- The Gold Coast Titans played their 100th game.

=== Grand final ===
	Score		Match Information
	Score		Date and Time	Venue	Referees	Crowd
Sydney Roosters	8 – 32	St. George Illawarra Dragons	3 October 2010, 5:00pm	ANZ Stadium	Tony Archer; Shayne Hayne	82,334

== See also ==
- 2010 NRL season
- 2010 in rugby league
