= Matt Utai =

NZ & Samoa international rugby league footballer (born 1981)

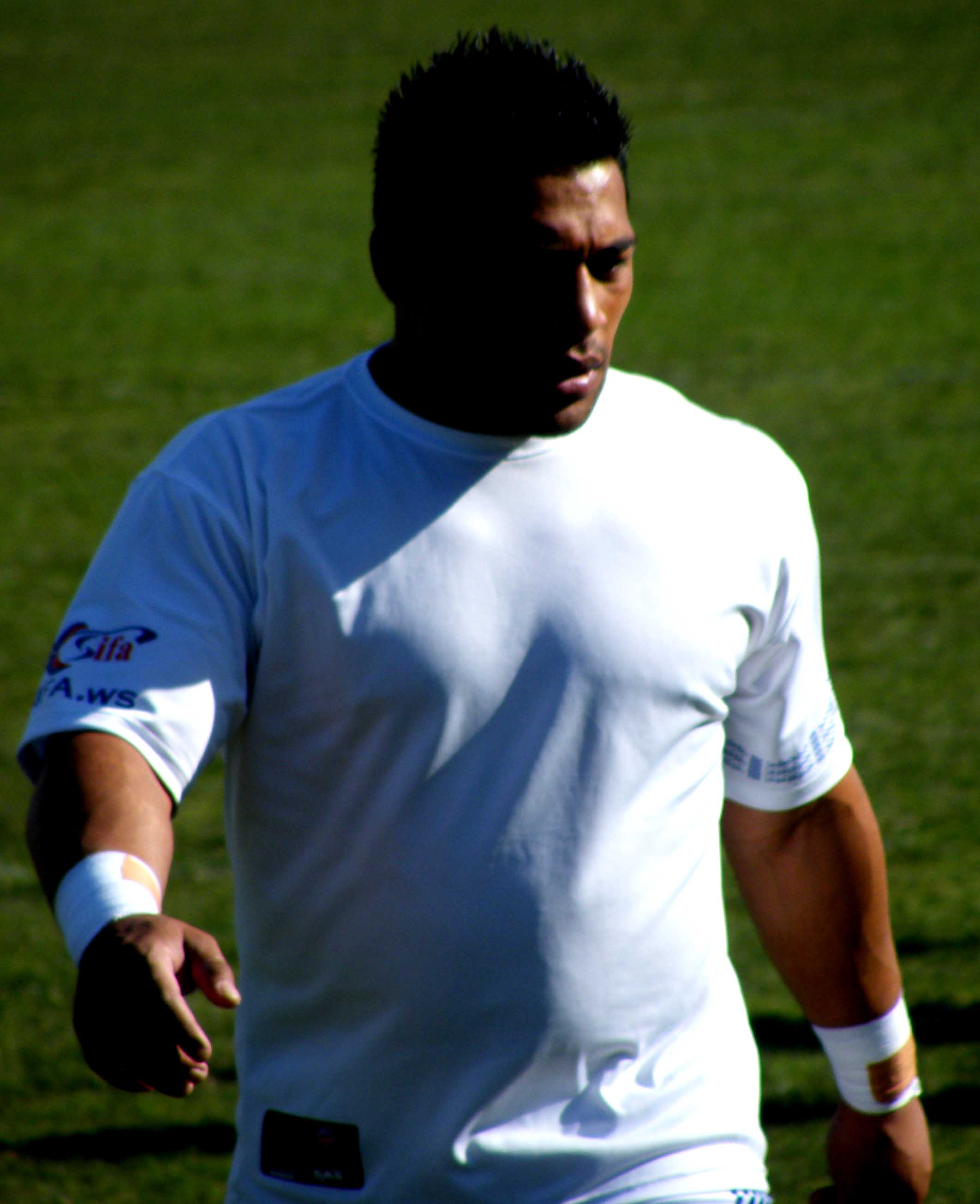

Personal information
- Full name: Matthew Okeuy Utai
- Born: 25 May 1981 (age 45) Auckland, New Zealand

Playing information
- Height: 169 cm (5 ft 7 in)
- Weight: 103 kg (16 st 3 lb)
- Position: Wing
Club
Years	Team	Pld	T	G	FG	P
2002–09	Canterbury Bulldogs	127	71	0	0	284
2011–13	Wests Tigers	40	14	0	0	56
	Total	167	85	0	0	340
Representative
Years	Team	Pld	T	G	FG	P
2002–05	New Zealand	4	2	0	0	8
2008	Samoa	3	2	0	0	8

Matthew Utai (born 25 May 1981) is a former professional rugby league footballer who last played as a winger for the Auburn Warriors in the Ron Massey Cup. A New Zealand and Samoa international representative, he previously played for the Wests Tigers and the Canterbury-Bankstown Bulldogs, with whom he won the 2004 NRL premiership.

== Background ==
Utai was born in Auckland, New Zealand, of Samoan descent.

== Playing career ==
=== Early career ===
Utai was a Berala Bears junior and came through the development squads at the Canterbury-Bankstown Bulldogs. In 2000, he started the year in Jersey Flegg, but his form warranted promotion to the Reserve Grade side and he played in 16 matches including scoring two tries in the Grand Final victory.

=== Canterbury- Bankstown Bulldogs ===
Making his NRL debut in 2002 NRL season, he scored 13 tries in 21 appearances and played in only 2 losses all year. However, the club did not play in the semis because of salary cap breaches. He was named the Dally M Rookie of the Year. In 2003, he scored 21 tries in 27 games, including scoring triples in three consecutive games.

Near the end of 2004, Utai scored 11 tries in the space of 7 games. He was a member of Canterbury's Premiership-winning team, playing in the 2004 NRL grand final on the wing in their 16–13 victory over the Sydney Roosters, scoring two tries in the match.

In a 2006 match, Utai became the first player that season to be sent off, for a swinging arm on the Wests Tigers' Stuart Flanagan. He was suspended for five weeks. He played in the club's 2006 preliminary final defeat against the Brisbane Broncos where he scored a try in a 37–20 loss. At halftime, Canterbury had led the match 20–6.

In the 2007 NRL season, Utai missed nearly the entire year through injury, but returned in 2008 and made 12 appearances as Canterbury endured a horror year on and off the field which included star player Sonny Bill Williams walking out on the club midway through the season. Canterbury would finish last in 2008 after winning five games all year.

In 2009, Utai spent most of the season playing for the Bankstown City side in the NSW Cup. He became the only Canterbury-Bankstown player to win five premierships across all grades when Bankstown City won the grand final that year.

=== Crusaders RL ===
He originally signed the Crusaders Super League club for 2010 but failed to recover from a knee injury. Instead Utai joined NSW Country Rugby League Club, Young in Group 9. Utai was then released from Young and joined the Auburn Warriors. He would have signed with the Wests Tigers but Welsh Super League club Crusaders demanded a compensation fee of $130,00.

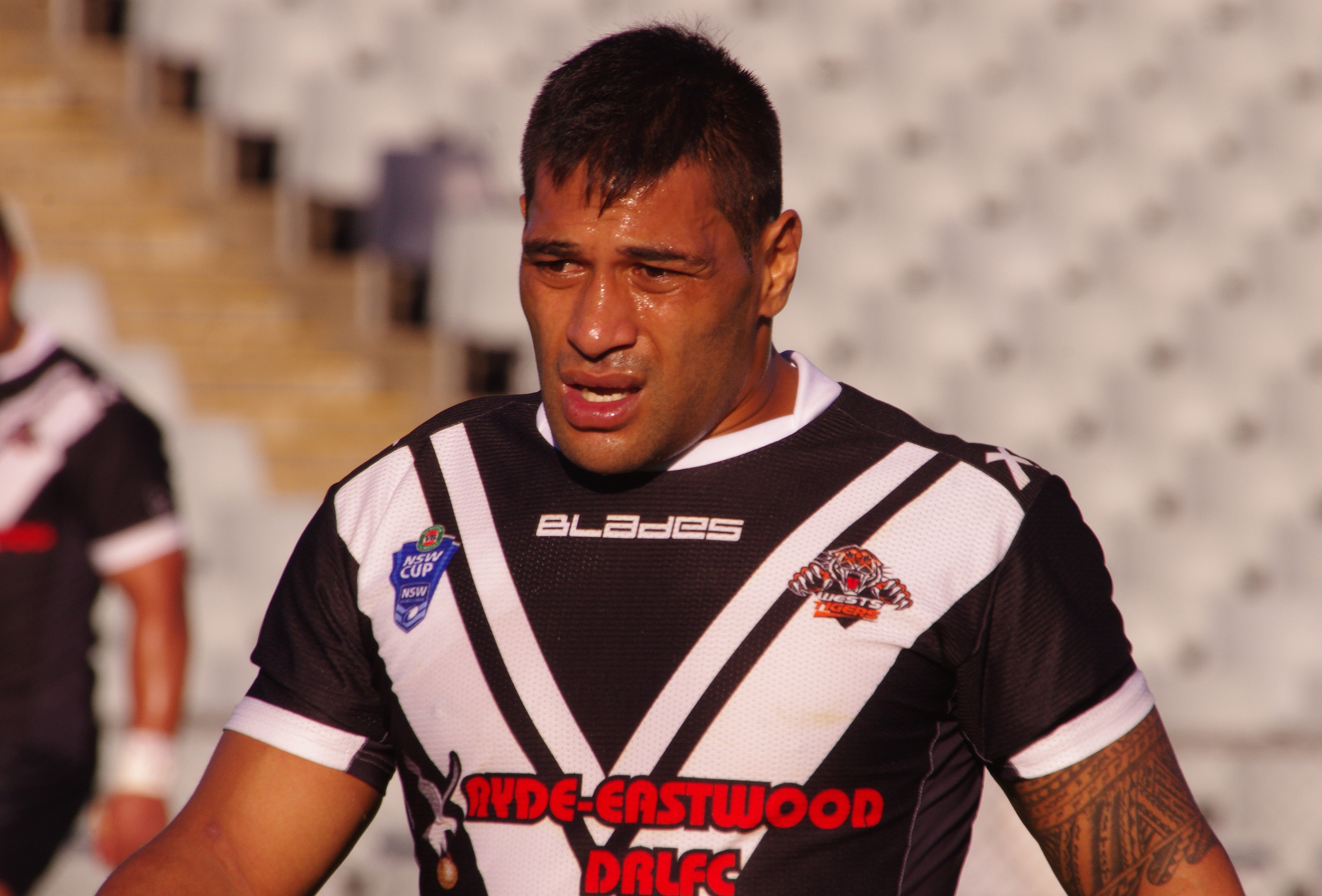
Utai playing for the Wests Tigers side in the NSW Cup

=== Wests Tigers ===
Utai joined the Wests Tigers in 2011, making his first appearance in the first round of the season. He was a regular on the wing throughout the season, and was re-signed for 2012, and signed a one-year extension in October 2012.

=== Auburn Warriors ===
In 2017, Utai signed on with the Auburn Warriors in the Ron Massey cup. On 24 September, he scored the only try for Auburn in their Ron Massey Cup grand final defeat by The Wentworthville Magpies.

== Representative career ==
Utai was selected to represent the New Zealand National Team on four occasions between 2002 and 2005, all matches against Australia.

Utai is of Samoan descent and made himself available for Samoa's 2008 Rugby League World Cup campaign. He was named in the Samoa squad, and went on to score two tries in his three appearances on the wing.

== Career highlights ==
- First Grade debut: 2002 - Round 4, Canterbury-Bankstown vs South Sydney Rabbitohs at Aussie Stadium, 5 April
- Premierships: 2004 - Canterbury-Bankstown vs Sydney Roosters
- Representative selection: 2002 - New Zealand vs Australia, Wellington, New Zealand, scoring one try
- Awards: 2002 - Dally M Rookie of the Year
- Falcon: 2011 - Best Falcon Ever

== Personal life ==
Utai was shot twice in a targeted drive-by shooting in Greenacre, Sydney, Australia on 17 February 2026 and was rushed to hospital in a serious condition. He sustained a gunshot to his lower leg and his shoulder, upper chest area during a drive-by shooting. Four teenagers were charged over the drive-by shooting and the alleged arson attacks targeting the Utai family in Sydney.
