= Mitch Brown (rugby league) =

Australian rugby league footballer

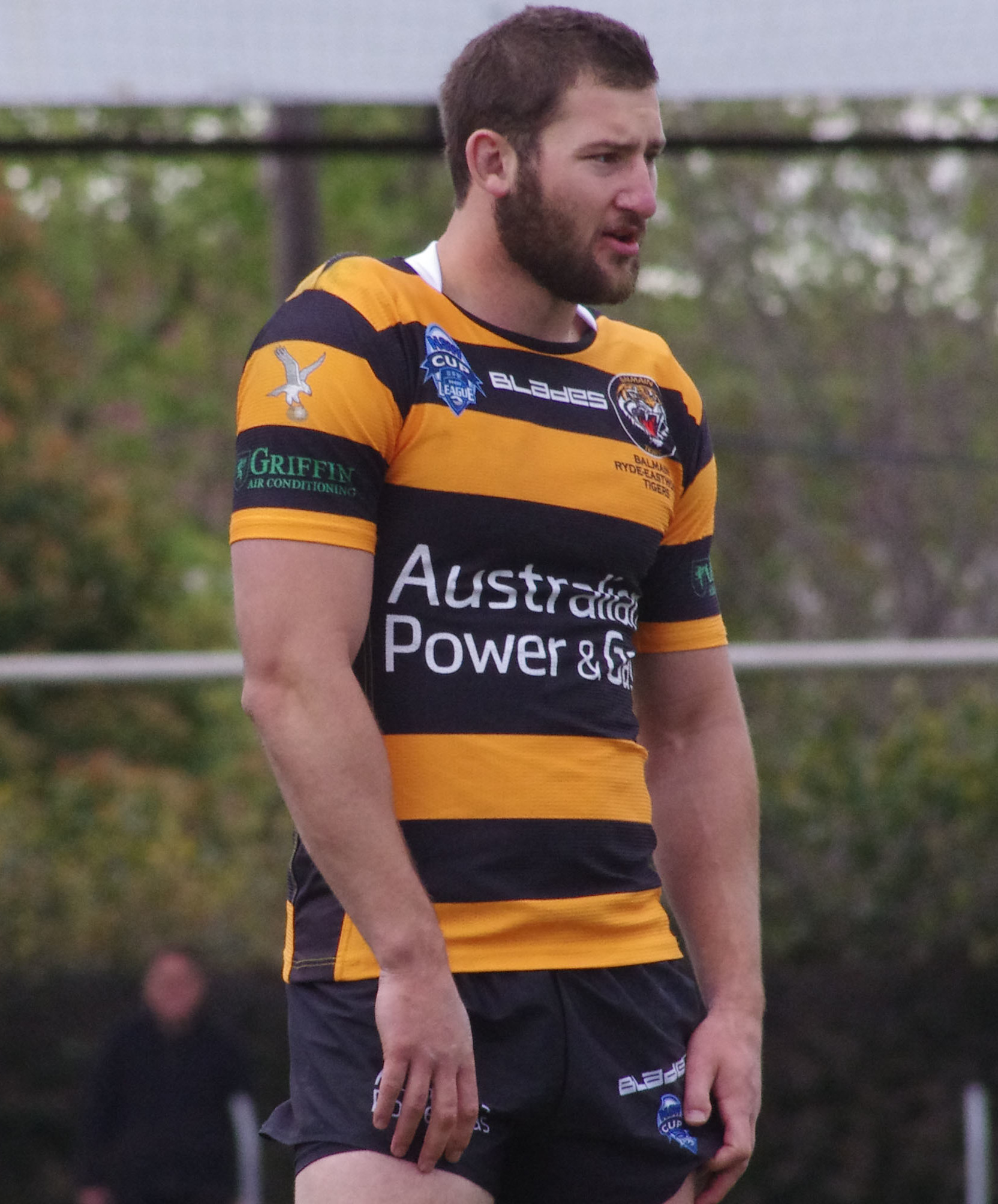

Personal information
- Full name: Mitchell Ronald Edwin Brown
- Born: 7 November 1987 (age 39) Sutherland, New South Wales, Australia
- Height: 188 cm (6 ft 2 in)
- Weight: 95 kg (14 st 13 lb)

Playing information
- Position: Wing, Centre, Fullback
Club
Years	Team	Pld	T	G	FG	P
2006–09	Cronulla Sharks	41	8	0	0	32
2010–12	Wests Tigers	40	8	1	0	34
2013–14	Canterbury Bulldogs	48	22	0	0	88
2015–16	Cronulla Sharks	3	1	0	0	4
2016–17	Leigh Centurions	33	11	0	0	44
2018	Warrington Wolves	12	2	0	0	8
	Total	177	52	1	0	210
Representative
Years	Team	Pld	T	G	FG	P
2015	NSW Residents	1	0	0	0	0
- Source: As of 9 January 2024

Mitchell Ronald Edwin Brown (born 7 November 1987) is a former Australian professional footballer who played for the Warrington Wolves in the Super League. He previously played for the Canterbury-Bankstown Bulldogs, the Cronulla-Sutherland Sharks, the Leigh Centurions and the Wests Tigers.

== Background ==
Brown was born in Sutherland, New South Wales, Australia.

== Playing career ==
Brown began playing junior rugby league for his local club side the Gymea Gorillas. He went to school at Endeavour Sports High School in the Sutherland Shire, working his way up through the age groups and representing the school at fullback in their back to back Arrive Alive Cup tournament wins.

While attending Endeavour, Brown played for the Australian Schoolboys team in 2005.

=== Cronulla-Sutherland Sharks ===
At the beginning of the 2006 NRL season, many pundits earmarked Brown as playing a major part in the Sharks new season campaign. However, for the majority of the season, Brown had to settle for playing in the lower grades for the Cronulla side after being behind David Simmons in the order for the fullback spot and both Darren Albert and Luke Covell on the wings. His chance didn't come until late in the season with the dropping of Darren Albert allowing Brown to make his debut on the wing for the Sharks.

2007 was a successful season for Brown, as he played in 14 of the 24 first games for the Sharks. An injury to fullback Brett Kearney early in the season gave Brown the opportunity at his preferred position of fullback. In 2008, Brown had limited opportunities as Brett Kearney played the majority of the season.

During the 2009 season, Brown played the majority of his games at fullback, due to Brett Kearney's season-ending injury towards the start of the season. On 17 July, Brown signed with the Wests Tigers for 2010 and 2011.

=== Wests Tigers ===
Brown was left out of the Wests Tigers side for the first games of the 2010 NRL season, but injuries to players like Tim Moltzen saw him make 20 appearances throughout season, and he was chosen as fullback for all three of the club's final matches. Noted for his versatility, Brown made 20 appearances in 2011, playing wing and centre when the Wests Tigers suffered long injuries to Chris Lawrence and Lote Tuqiri. Having started the 2012 season with the Wests Tigers, Brown was released to join Canterbury Bulldogs after round one. Tigers CEO Stephen Humphreys said, "he felt he needed to position himself somewhere where he could secure a starting spot. His preferred position is centre."

=== Canterbury-Bankstown Bulldogs ===
An anterior cruciate ligament (ACL) knee injury early in the 2012 season saw him play no games that year.

Playing all but one game on the wing in 2013, Brown scored 12 tries from 24 appearances, both personal bests. In round 7, playing against old club Cronulla, Brown scored his first ever double. He went on the score another two doubles before the end of the year.

Brown was on the wing again in 2014, apart from a 4-week stint at fullback when Sam Perrett was unavailable. He played in all four of the Bulldogs post-season games, including the grand final which they lost 30–6 against South Sydney.

=== Return to Cronulla ===
Brown returned to Cronulla for the 2015 season, saying, "I've lived here my whole life, I've never moved, I just travelled. I've been a Sharks supporter since I can remember and I was born in Sutherland Hospital so I'm a Shire boy through and through. I've always supported the Sharks and I always wanted to come back when I left. I'm the only local junior apart from Anthony Moratis."

After being chosen on the wing for the first game of the season, Brown made just one further appearance for the 2015 season after being dropped due to poor form.

He joined the Leigh Centurions part way through the 2016 season. In November 2017 he signed a one-year deal with Warrington Wolves.
