= Tim Moltzen =

Australian rugby league footballer

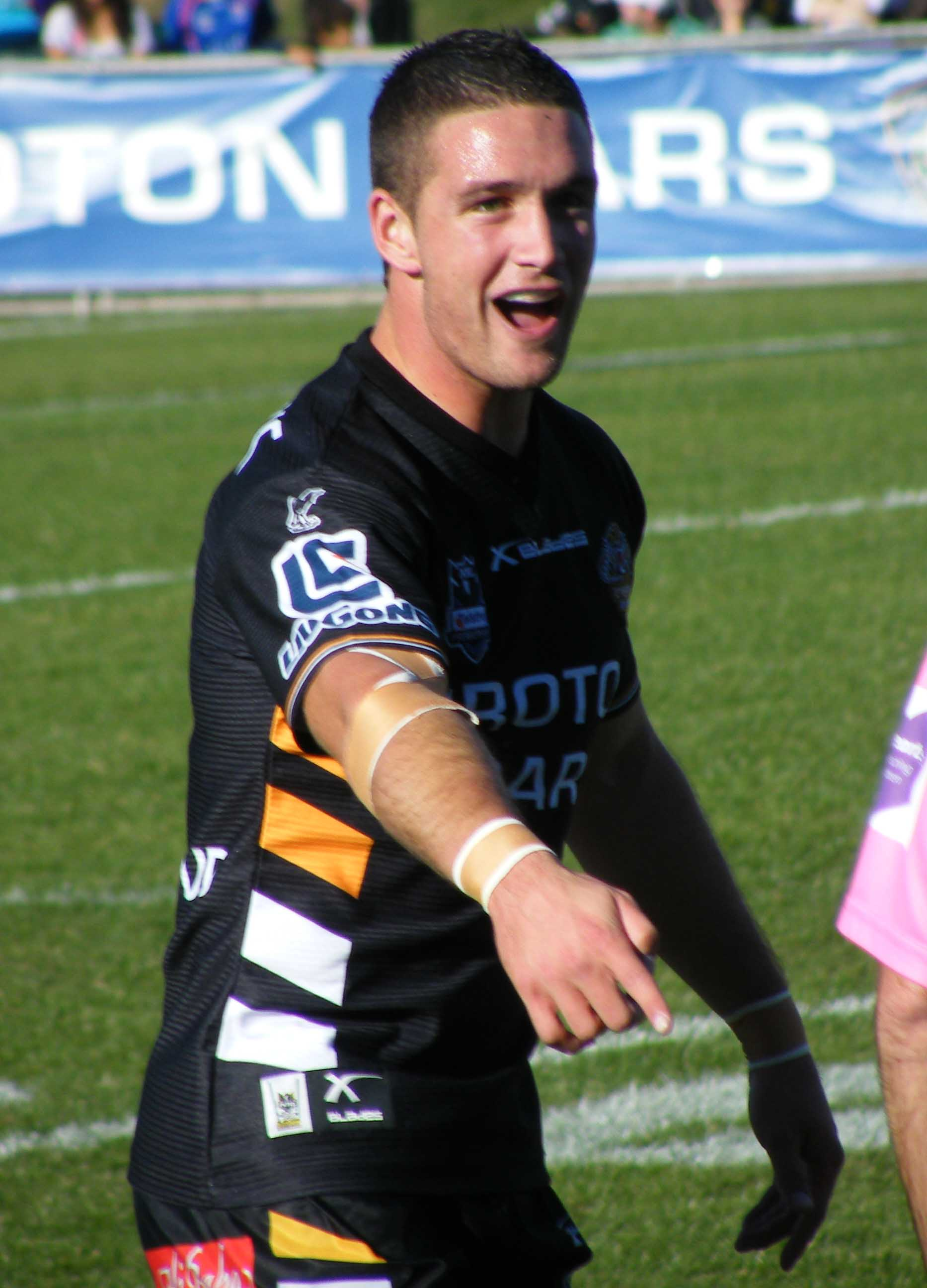

Personal information
- Full name: Tim Paul Moltzen
- Born: 15 September 1988 (age 38) Wahroonga, New South Wales, Australia
- Height: 185 cm (6 ft 1 in)
- Weight: 85 kg (13 st 5 lb)

Playing information
- Position: Fullback, Halfback, Five-eighth, Centre
Club
| Years | Team | Pld | T | G | FG | P |
|---|---|---|---|---|---|---|
| 2008–13 | Wests Tigers | 90 | 39 | 2 | 0 | 160 |
Representative
| Years | Team | Pld | T | G | FG | P |
| 2011 | NSW Country | 1 | 0 | 0 | 0 | 0 |

Tim Moltzen (born 15 September 1988) is an Australian former professional rugby league footballer who played for the Wests Tigers in the National Rugby League. He mostly played at fullback, halfback and five-eighth, but could also fill in at centre.

== Wests Tigers, 2008–2011 ==
Moltzen played junior football with the Terrigal Sharks. He has a metal plate at the back of his skull from an injury that occurred in junior football.

Playing in the inaugural under-20s competition in 2008, Moltzen was considered to be one of the young stars of competition.

Moltzen made his first grade debut in the first game of the 2008 season. Scoring a try in each of his first two games, he made ten appearances for the season, and was named the club's rookie of the year.

In November 2009, Moltzen signed a contract extension to remain with the Tigers until the end of the 2012 season. At the time, Tigers chief executive Stephen Humphreys described Moltzen as, "a crucial member in Wests Tigers going forward."

Playing against the Cowboys in round 5 of the 2010 season, Moltzen ruptured the anterior cruciate ligament in his left knee. He was ruled out for the rest of the year and required a knee reconstruction.

Before the start of the 2011 season, Ricky Stuart named Moltzen in a "Blues in Waiting" squad, for potential future NSW State of Origin players. He was described as one of the players, "on the cusp of selection."

Moltzen made a slow recovery from injury, starting from the bench in first games of the 2011 season, saying it took time to get back, "into the old ways, getting tackled and not worried about getting up and, you know, my leg's fallen off." By round 8 he had recovered enough to make his representative debut for Country Origin, but was struggling to refind his form from before the injury. By the end of the season, Moltzen's performances were being praised, and he had replaced Wade McKinnon as starting fullback. He played in every game of the 2011 season.

== 2011 contract controversy ==
Newspapers were reporting that Moltzen had been given permission to negotiate with other clubs partway through 2011. Moltzen denied he wished to leave the Wests Tigers in May, saying, "I'm definitely committed to the Tigers and I love the Tigers and all the boys at the club so I'm not looking to go anywhere."

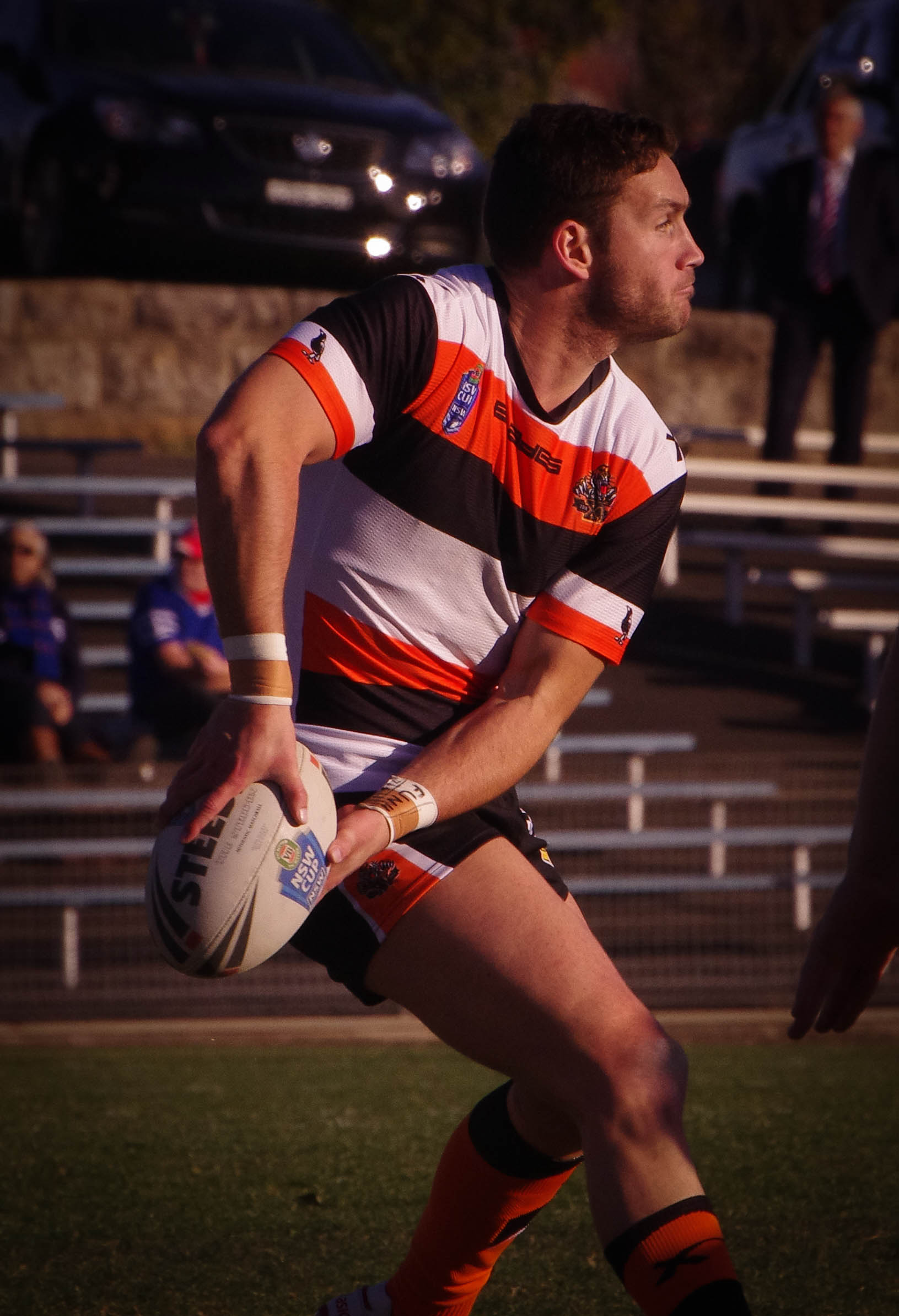
Moltzen, 2014

The St George Illawarra Dragons announced the signing of Moltzen to a 3-year contract midway through the 2011 season, commencing from 2012. Controversially, Wests Tigers CEO Stephen Humphreys claimed the club had not yet officially released Moltzen from the last year of his contract, labelling the actions, "arrogant and disrespectful."

On 7 October 2011, it was reported that Moltzen did not want to honour his contract with the Dragons, with the Wests Tigers club stating that Moltzen had never been formally released from his contract. Humphreys said of the contract dispute, "Tim is contracted to us for 2012. We have the only contract of his that is registered by the NRL." Three days later, Wests Tigers appeared to do a backflip with CEO Humphreys stating "The way that it is likely to play out is that he will be going to the Dragons. We will have a conversation with them in the next few days about it, but we have been working on the assumption that he won't be here next season." Another two days on, St George Dragons referred the matter to the NRL after Wests Tigers announced Moltzen would be staying at the club.

On 3 November it was announced that St. George Illawarra would not be seeking registration of Moltzen's contract, and he would remain with the Wests Tigers.

== Wests Tigers, 2012–2015 ==
Moltzen finished the 2011 season, "as one of the form players of the competition," but the departure of Robert Lui saw Moltzen starting 2012 as the Wests Tigers halfback. Coach Tim Sheens said of the move, "With Moltzen and Marshall, we'll have the fastest halves combination in the game. No other team is going to have more speed over 80 metres than that pair."

Moltzen lasted just 3 games at halfback, averaging a lowly 35 metres per game in attack and making 5 errors. His poor form, and a season-ending injury to James Tedesco in the first game of the season, saw him moved back to fullback. The move had effect, with Moltzen scoring 7 tries in his next 8 games.

Midway through the season, Moltzen signed a contract to remain at the club for another three years. It was said that while Moltzen, "appeared to suffer from the speculation surrounding his future, having failed to consistently find form this year, there is no doubt on his day he can be a gamebreaker." Moltzen said of the decision, "I wouldn't say I was close to leaving. There was some interest floating around but obviously my main priority was to stay where I am. I didn't want to go through all the drama I had gone through previously. Being able to stick around was my main focus." Despite his variable form, Moltzen was the club's top try-scorer for the year, with 12 tries from 20 appearances, and led the club in line-breaks.

In 2013, Moltzen played the first six games at fullback. In round seven, he was moved to halfback to cover for an injured Braith Anasta. In the second half of the match he ruptured the anterior cruciate ligament (ACL) on the same knee that had suffered the injury three years previously, and took no further part in the season. Moltzen had returned from injury and was in pre-season training in December 2013, when he suffered a further injury to the same knee He later said, "From there it was downhill. I had no appetite. I was lethargic. I just felt and looked like shit. I was gaunt and pale. I kept going back week on week to get blood tests. They kept saying nothing was wrong. I went to bed [one] night and woke up and felt like my leg was wet. I had white sheets and my bed was covered in blood. I looked down and the stitches had popped." He remained at the club for a further two seasons without appearing in first grade.

== Retirement ==
On 12 August 2015, Moltzen signed a 1-year contract with the Manly-Warringah Sea Eagles starting in 2016, however he announced on 6 May 2016 that he was forced to retire due to a chronic knee injury before getting to play any games for Manly.

== Career highlights ==
- First Grade Debut: 2008 – Round 1, Wests Tigers vs St. George Illawarra Dragons, 16 March, scoring one try
- Wests Tigers 2008 NRL Rookie of the Year.
