= Simon Dwyer =

Australian rugby league footballer

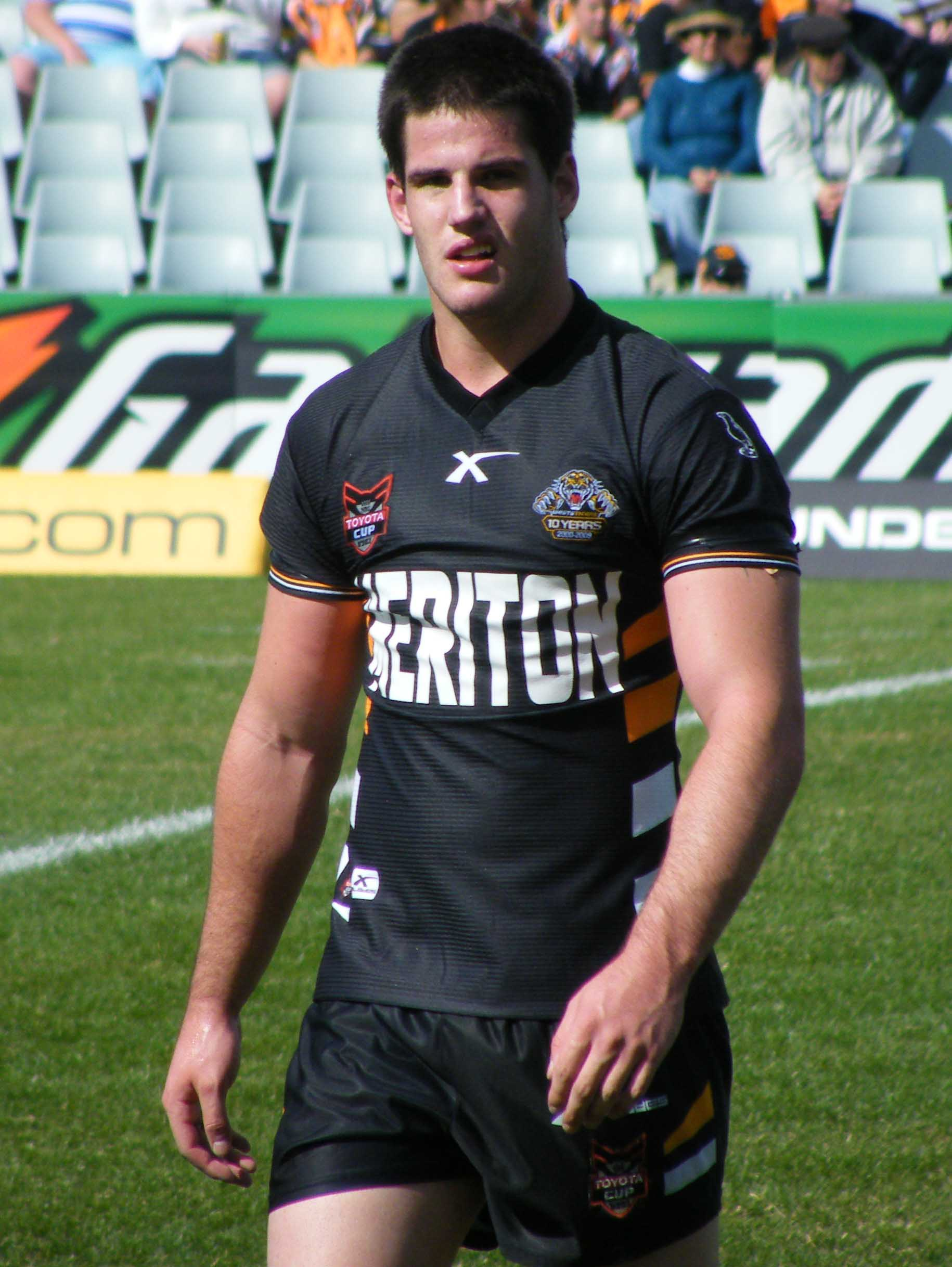
- Dwyer playing for the Wests Tigers U20s

Personal information
- Full name: Simon Dwyer
- Born: 12 January 1989 (age 37) Sydney, Australia
- Height: 192 cm (6 ft 4 in)
- Weight: 91 kg (14 st 5 lb)

Playing information
- Position: Second-row
Club
Years	Team	Pld	T	G	FG	P
2009–11	Wests Tigers	35	6	0	0	24
Representative
Years	Team	Pld	T	G	FG	P
2011	NSW City	1	1	0	0	4
- Source: As of 30 January 2019

Simon Dwyer (born 12 January 1989) is an Australian former professional rugby league footballer, he played for the Wests Tigers in the National Rugby League (NRL). He primarily played in the back-row. He was described as "one of the brightest prospects in the game" before a career-ending injury in 2011.

== Playing career ==
Hailing from Macquarie Fields, Dwyer played junior football with the Ingleburn Bulldogs and Western Suburbs.

Before his debut Royce Simmons described him as, "a big, strong back-rower, who plays on the right edge and hits a good line, has a good offload..."

Impressing coach Tim Sheens with his two appearances in 2009, Dwyer was named in the first-grade squad for 2010. He was a regular in the first grade team in the second half of 2010, mostly starting on the bench. He was named the club's rookie of the year at the end of the season, and noted as "one of the most improved players in the NRL in 2010." Before the end of the year, he signed a contract extension to remain with the Wests Tigers until the end of 2012.

Dwyer received some recognition in the press for a tackle he made on Jared Waerea-Hargreaves in the 2010 qualifying final against the Sydney Roosters. It was described as "the best hit in a century", and received praise from noted defender David Gillespie.

In 2011, Dwyer made his representative debut, playing for City Origin and scoring a try. He was also chosen to participate in a NSW developmental squad. Unfortunately, halfway through the season, Dwyer suffered a brachial plexus injury in a match against the Canterbury-Bankstown Bulldogs, which saw him unable to play for the rest of the season. Some months later, full feeling had not returned to his right hand, and there was serious doubt as to whether he would be able to play again. Dwyer was de-registered by Wests Tigers and there was hope he would re-sign with them if he made a full recovery.

Dwyer underwent surgery at the Royal North Shore Hospital, with nerves redirected from his diaphragm and scapula into his right shoulder and arm. As of 2012, the operation was deemed a success, and Dwyer hoped to return to rugby league in the future. Since the nerve redirection surgery and subsequent rehabilitation, it had become apparent that Dwyer will not regain functionality in his right arm. While he will not return to the football field, Dwyer does not allow his ailment to stop his positivity and drive to succeed in other areas of his life.

== Post playing ==
In 2012, Dwyer was named as the assistant coach for the City Origin side, under head-coach Brad Fittler.

As of 2018, Dwyer works with the Wests Tigers as a Performance Analyst.

In 2022, Dwyer was inducted as a life member of the Wests Tigers.

== Career highlights ==
- First Grade Debut: 2009 – Round 19, Wests Tigers vs North Queensland Cowboys, 19 July.
