= Liam Fulton =

Australian rugby league footballer (born 1984)

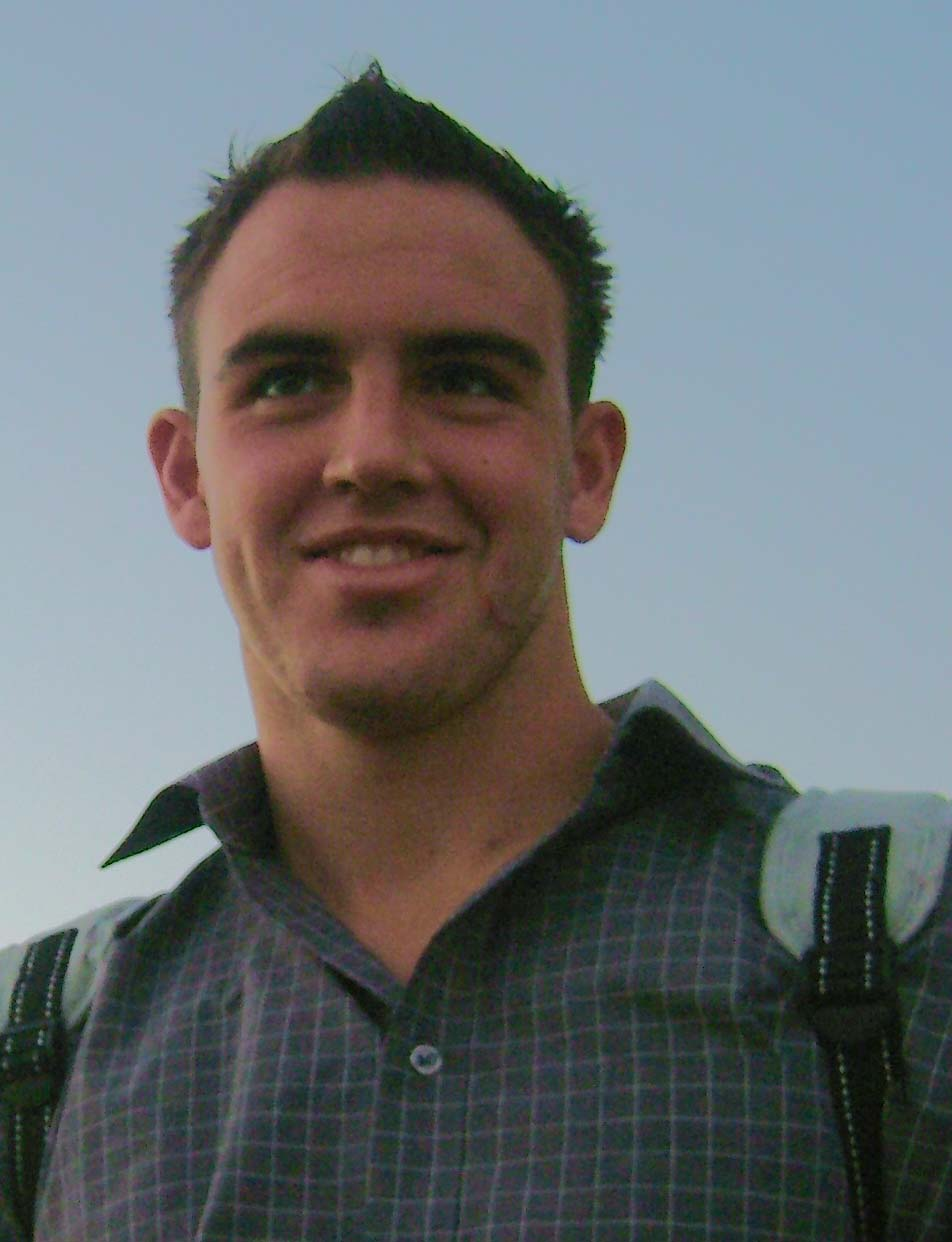

Personal information
- Full name: Liam Mark Fulton
- Born: 8 August 1984 (age 42) Sydney, New South Wales, Australia

Playing information
- Height: 187 cm (6 ft 2 in)
- Weight: 95 kg (14 st 13 lb)
- Position: Second-row, Lock, Five-eighth
Club
Years	Team	Pld	T	G	FG	P
2003–08	Wests Tigers	77	18	0	0	72
2009	Huddersfield Giants	17	4	0	0	16
2010–14	Wests Tigers	85	19	0	0	76
	Total	179	41	0	0	164
Representative
Years	Team	Pld	T	G	FG	P
2011	NRL All Stars	1	0	0	0	0
2011–12	City Origin	2	0	0	0	0

Liam Mark Fulton (born 8 August 1984), also known by the nickname of "Bozo", is an Australian former professional rugby league footballer who played in the 2000s and 2010s. He played for the Wests Tigers in the National Rugby League (NRL) competition. Fulton primarily played at lock. Considered to be a jokester, known for making prank phone calls, Fulton was also a noted clubman. Former team-mate Benji Marshall described him as, "not the biggest, he's not the strongest in the gym, he doesn't look athletic with his shirt off. He weighs only 96 kilograms. But he puts that body on the line every week, he makes his tackles and I have never played with a second-rower who runs a better line. He is so talented."

== Early life ==
Fulton was born in Westmead, New South Wales and started playing junior rugby league football for Greystanes Devils under-7s when he was four years old. While attending Westfields Sports High School, Fulton played for the Australian Schoolboys team in 2002. He captained the SG Ball Cup team to victory in the Grand Final in 2002 while playing for the Western Suburbs Magpies, coming back from 16-0 down to win 18–16. Later in his career, Fulton said, "My father used to film the SG Ball matches and often when I go to his house, we will put on the videos and watch the games again. Those memories will always be with me."

== Playing career ==
=== 2000s ===
Having recently turned 19, Fulton made his National Rugby League début for the Wests Tigers from the bench in the last game of the 2003 NRL season. He played three games in 2004, before becoming a regular fixture in first grade in 2005. Fulton again tasted success in 2005 when the Wests Tigers defeated the North Queensland Cowboys in the 2005 NRL grand final to win the club's first NRL premiership. As NRL Premiers Wests faced Super League champions Bradford Bulls in the 2006 World Club Challenge. Fulton played from the interchange bench in the Tigers' 30–10 loss. This early success in his career was tempered by a serious shoulder injury in the opening game of the 2006 season, which sidelined him for the whole season.

Due to salary cap issues Wests Tigers were forced to let Fulton go to English Super League club Huddersfield Giants for the 2009 season, and there he was a member of the team that played in the Challenge Cup final. In October 2009, Fulton signed a two-year contract to return to the Wests Tigers from 2010.

=== 2010s ===
In 2011, Fulton made his representative debut, playing for first NRL All Stars, and later City Origin. Midway through 2011, Fulton was given permission to negotiate with other clubs as Wests Tigers struggled to fit incoming forward Adam Blair under the salary cap. Fulton said of the opportunity, "There's a lot of talk going around signing players and people having to leave but at the end of the day I've got another two years here." He ended up remaining with the club, with former team-mate Mark O'Neill describing his end-of-season form as, "career best."

An injury-disrupted season for the Wests Tigers saw Fulton playing games at hooker and five-eighth in 2012. He still made 778 tackles, placing him in the top 20 for most tackles in the NRL for the regular season. At the end of the year, he received the club's Noel Kelly Medal for the best forward.

Before the beginning of the 2013 NRL season, Fulton signed a new contract to remain with club until the end of the 2016 season, saying, "I'm really pleased with this new contract. To be a one NRL club player means a lot to me." He played in 21 games in 2013, leading the team with 834 tackles. At the end of the season he was awarded the club's Best and Fairest and Player's Player.

Knocked unconscious in the first game of the 2014 season, Fulton was unable to return to the field. Wests Tigers, who were winning at the time, went on to suffer a defeat. Fulton later said, "I've been concussed that many times that I'm probably beyond it now, to be honest. You get paid well and I think everyone knows that there's going to be head knocks involved and if you don't want to cop a head knock you don't play really." Fulton announced his immediate retirement from the game on 10 July 2014, after receiving further concussions which had caused short-term memory loss and confusion. While told that the effects of the head-knocks may reversed, he was also warned he risk permanent damage if he suffered any more. "Rugby league has given me everything, to be honest. It's up there with the best thing that's ever happened to me in my life," he said.

== Post playing ==
In 2017, Fulton was appointed Head Coach of the Campbelltown City Kangaroos and proved an instant success, leading the 1st Grade team to their first Group 6 title in 34 years. He was also made a Wests Tigers Life Member.

== Statistics ==
Year	Team	Games	Tries	Pts
2003	Wests Tigers	1		
2004	Wests Tigers	3		
2005	Wests Tigers	28	7	28
2006	Wests Tigers	1		
2007	Wests Tigers	23	6	24
2008	Wests Tigers	21	5	20
2009	Huddersfield Giants	17	4	16
2010	Wests Tigers	18	6	24
2011	Wests Tigers	20	5	20
2012	Wests Tigers	20	6	24
2013	Wests Tigers	21	2	8
2014	Wests Tigers	6		
	Totals	179	41	164

== Highlights ==
- First Grade Debut: 2003 – Round 26, Wests Tigers v New Zealand Warriors, Mount Smart Stadium, Auckland, New Zealand, 6 September.
- Premierships: 2005 – Wests Tigers defeated North Queensland Cowboys 30 - 16 in the Grand Final, Stadium Australia, Sydney, 2 October.
- NSW City Origin Debut: 2011 – NSW City Origin v NSW Country Origin, Lavington Sports Ground, Albury, New South Wales, 6 May.
- NSW City Origin Selection: 2011-2012
