= Robert Lui =

Australian professional rugby league footballer

Rob Lui
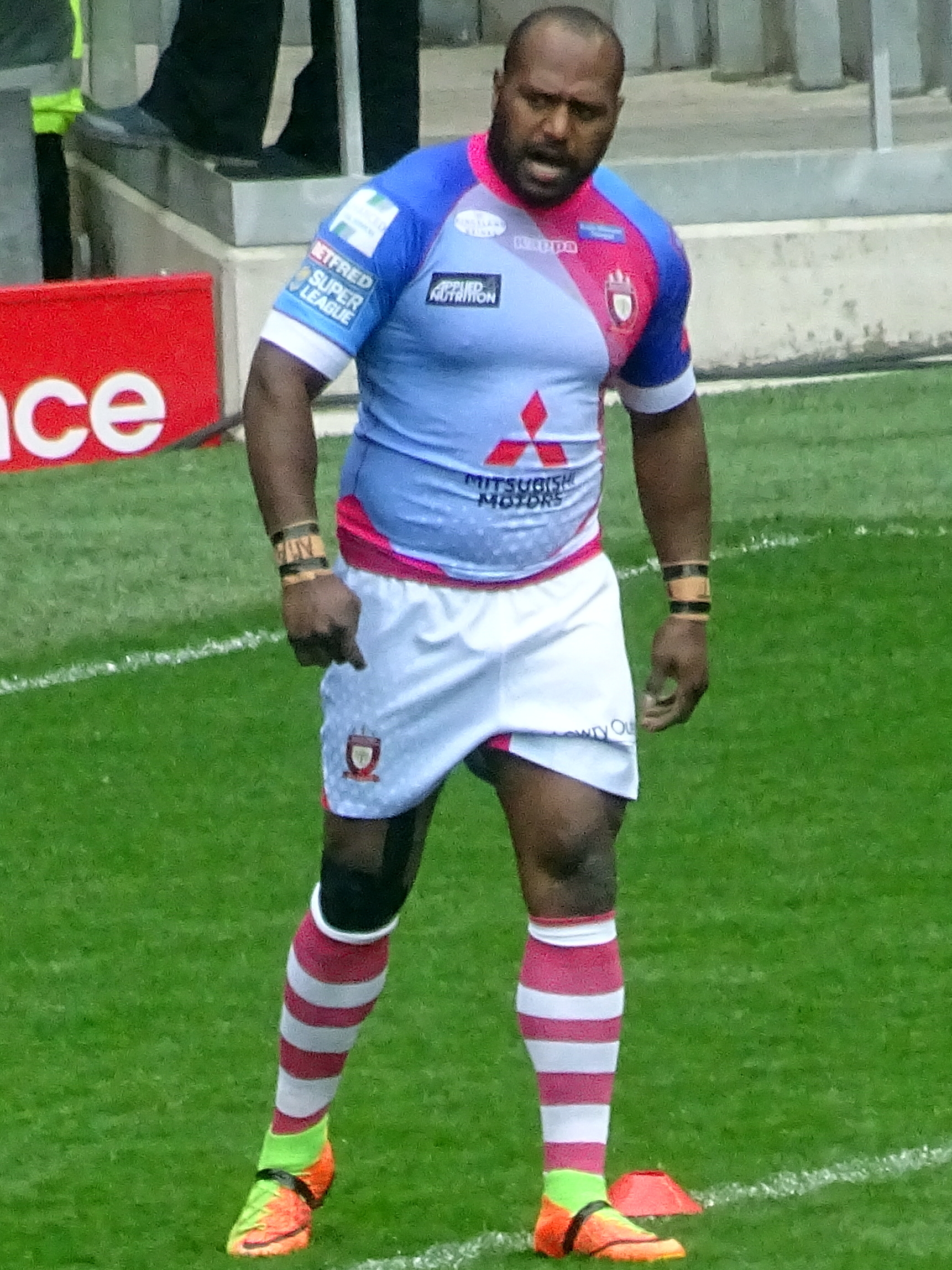

Personal information
- Full name: Robert Lui
- Born: 23 February 1990 (age 36) Townsville, Queensland, Australia
- Height: 5 ft 10 in (1.77 m)
- Weight: 15 st 2 lb (96 kg)

Playing information
- Position: Five-eighth, Halfback
Club
Years	Team	Pld	T	G	FG	P
2009–11	Wests Tigers	43	9	0	1	37
2012–15	North Qld Cowboys	46	13	5	0	62
2016–19	Salford Red Devils	109	35	33	0	206
2019(loan)	→ Leeds Rhinos	10	3	0	0	12
2020–21	Leeds Rhinos	27	8	0	1	33
	Total	235	68	38	2	350
- Source: As of 8 June 2021

Robert Lui (born 23 February 1990) is an Australian professional rugby league footballer who plays as a five-eighth or halfback for the Townsville Blackhawks in the Queensland Cup.

He has previously played for the Wests Tigers and the North Queensland Cowboys in the NRL and the Salford Red Devils in the Super League. He spent the latter part of the 2019 Super League season on loan from Salford at the Leeds Rhinos. He moved to Leeds on a permanent basis at the conclusion of his loan move.

== Background ==
Lui was born and brought up in Townsville, Queensland, Australia. He is of Torres Strait Islander descent.

He played his junior football with the Upper Ross Rams and later for the Centrals Tigers before being spotted by the Tigers and undertaking a scholarship at Keebra Park High on the Gold Coast, Queensland. In 2007, he made the Queensland Open Schoolboys side and accepted a scholarship with the Australian Institute of Sport. After completing high school, Lui joined the Wests Tigers NYC team in 2008.

== Playing career ==
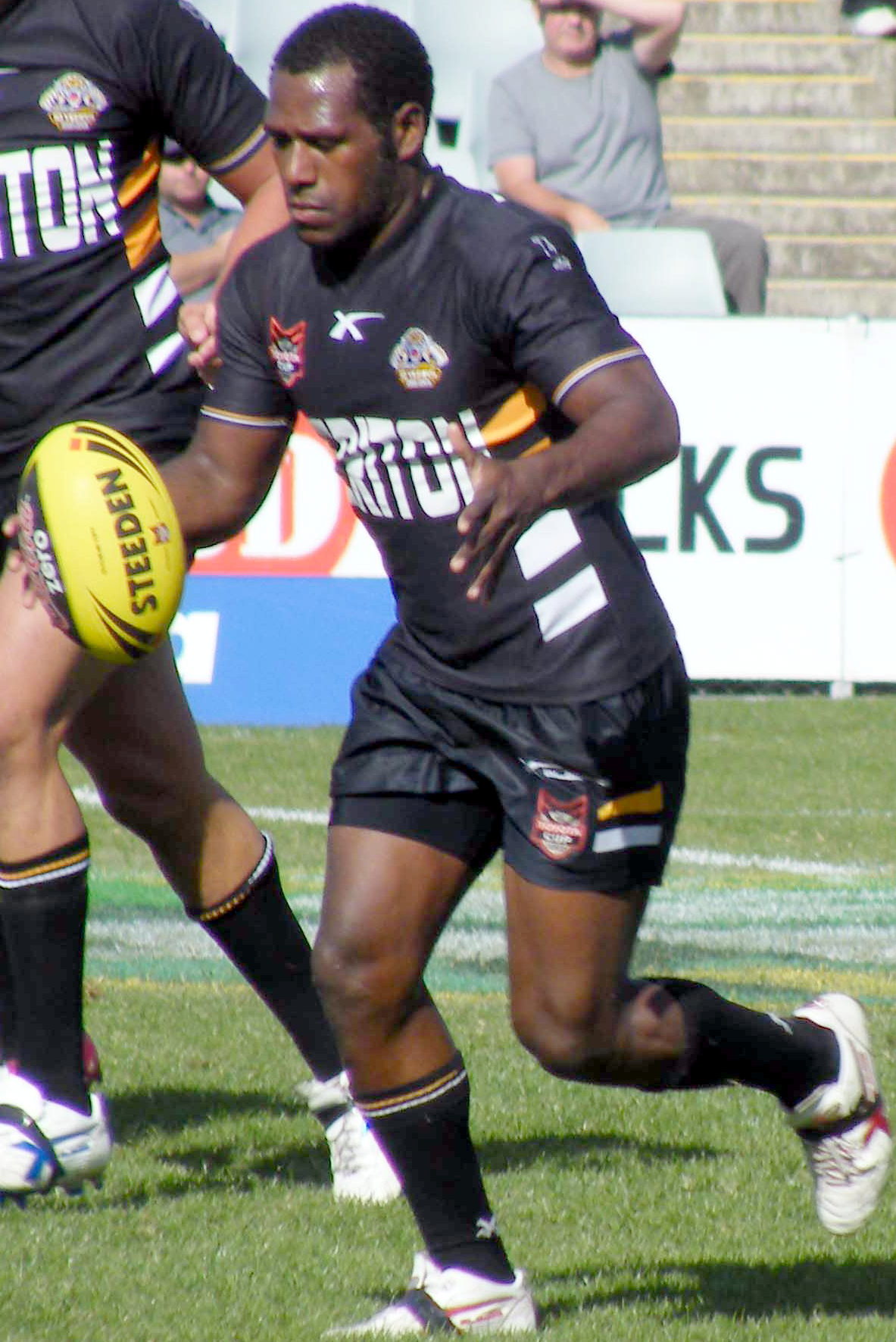
Lui playing for Wests' under-20s in 2009

=== 2009 ===
Lui started the season playing for the Tigers' NYC team. He made his NRL debut in Round 23, in a 56–10 win over Cronulla Sharks, and played 2 further games near the end of the season. Returning to the Wests Tigers' NYC team, he played in the team that lost the Grand Final to Melbourne Storm, scoring a try in the second half. At the end of the season, Lui was named in the Toyota Cup Team of the Year.

=== 2010 ===
In March, Lui re-signed for the Wests Tigers to the end of the 2012 season, with coach Tim Sheens describing him as, "an integral part of the team."

Lui was named to start the season at halfback, but suffered an injury in round 2. Upon his return, in round 10, he scored his first try. Lui played 17 games in 2010, improving as the season progressed, with one newspaper describing his last game of the year, in the preliminary final, as the, "best game of his career."

=== 2011 ===
Lui played in 23 games in 2011, scoring 5 tries. From round 17 onward, Lui was halfback as Wests Tigers won nine games straight, eventually losing in the semi-final. Lui was said to be, "the first halfback in years to properly gel with Benji Marshall."

At the end of the 2011 season, Lui was released from his contract with the Wests Tigers after he was charged with assaulting his partner, Taleah Rae Backo, in her North Strathfield home. He had previously been charged with similar offences after an incident at the end of 2010 season, with those charges being dismissed in April. He pleaded guilty to assault occasioning actual bodily harm on his former partner and was placed on a two-year good behaviour bond and fined $2000.

=== 2012 ===
Lui signed a two-year contract to play for his hometown team, the North Queensland Cowboys. He made his debut for the Cowboys in Round 1, coming off the bench to play in the halves. The next few weeks Lui was pushed back to reserve grade to regain match fitness after his pre-season was hindered by a serious knee injury. He played in five games for the Northern Pride. Lui's 2012 campaign was cut short however after being suspended from playing any form of rugby league for the rest of the season after pleading guilty to an assault charge placed against him several months earlier. His ban was placed on him from Round 8. He was free to start playing rugby league again in the 2013 trials.

=== 2013 ===
Although being suspended for a majority of the 2012 season, Lui retained his job at the North Queensland Cowboys and remained training with the club full-time for the rest of his suspension. Before his suspension, Lui was regarded as a possible future representative player and was included in the 2011 Emerging Origin Squad for Queensland.

=== 2014 ===
In February 2014, Lui was a member of North Queensland's victorious Auckland Nines side. On 2 September 2014, Lui agreed to a one-year contract extension with the club, keeping him in Townsville until the end of 2015.

=== 2015 ===
Lui spent the majority of the 2015 season playing for North Queensland's feeder side, the Townsville Blackhawks. On 3 October, Lui signed a one-year deal with the Salford Red Devils, reuniting him with former coach Tim Sheens.

=== 2016 ===
Lui made a total of 21 appearances for Salford in 2016 scoring 11 tries.

=== 2017 ===
On 23 June 2017, Salford were up by three converted tries with less than five minutes to play against St Helens. St Helens then scored three converted tries in four minutes to make the score 24–24. With seconds remaining, Lui tried and in-field kick which was picked up by Saints player Matty Smith who kicked a long range field goal to win the match for St Helens 25–24.

On 27 June 2017, Lui signed a long-term contract to remain at Salford.

=== 2018 ===
Lui made 21 appearances for Salford in 2018 and finished as the top point scorer for the club. At the start of the year he was subject to a bid by Hull Kingston Rovers which was rejected by Salford.

=== 2019 ===
Lui signed on loan from the Salford Red Devils until the end of the 2019 season, and later signed a two-year contract with Leeds from the 2020 season onwards.

=== 2020 ===
On 17 October, Lui played in the 2020 Challenge Cup Final which Leeds won 17–16 over Salford at Wembley Stadium.

=== 2021 ===
Lui played a total of 11 games for Leeds in the 2021 Super League season including the club's 36–8 loss against St Helens in the semi-final. The match was Lui's last as a player due to him announcing his retirement earlier in the year.

On 22 November 2021, it was reported that he had rejoined Townsville Blackhawks, a feeder club to the North Queensland Cowboys

=== 2022 ===
Lui played 12 games for Townsville in the 2022 Queensland Cup season. In December, Lui signed for Centrals in the local Townsville district rugby league competition.

== Statistics ==
=== NRL ===
Statistics are correct to the end of the 2021 season

Season	Team	Matches	T	G	GK %	F/G	Pts
2009	Wests Tigers	3	0	0	—	0	0
2010	Wests Tigers	17	4	0	—	1	17
2011	Wests Tigers	23	5	0	—	0	20
2012	North Queensland Cowboys	1	0	0	—	0	0
2013	North Queensland Cowboys	16	7	5	71.4	0	38
2014	North Queensland Cowboys	25	6	0	—	0	24
2015	North Queensland Cowboys	4	0	0	—	0	0
2016	Salford Red Devils	29	13	1			54
2017	Salford Red Devils	32	6	1			26
2018	Salford Red Devils	28	9	31			98
2019	Salford Red Devils	20	7				28
2019	Leeds Rhinos	10	3				12
2020	Leeds Rhinos	16	3				12
2021	Leeds Rhinos	11	5			1	21
Career totals		235	68	38	71.4	2	350

== Personal life ==
Phillip Lui, Robert's father, played for Queensland A in the late 1980s.

Former Cowboys' teammate and good friend Ray Thompson is godfather to Lui's son.

Upon his return from the Super League, Lui played in the Queensland Cup for the Townsville Blackhawks before transitioning to a coaching role for the Centrals Tigers in the A-grade competition within the Townsville District Rugby League.
