= 2011 Parramatta Eels season =

Australia Rugby League Parramatta Eels 2011 season

- NRL Rank: 14th
- Play-off result: DNQ
- World Club Challenge: DNQ
- 2011 record: Wins: 6; draws: 1; losses: 17
- Points scored: For: 385; against: 538

Team information
- CEO: Paul Osborne
- Coach: (New Zealand) Stephen Kearney
- Captain: (Australia) Nathan Hindmarsh
- Stadium: Parramatta Stadium (Capacity: 20,741); ANZ Stadium (Capacity: 83,500)
- Avg. attendance: 15,150 (Home); 16,431 (Home & Away)
- Agg. attendance: 181,796 (Home); 394,339 (Home & Away)
- High attendance: 30,687 (15 April vs Canterbury-Bankstown Bulldogs, Round 6)

Top scorers
- Tries: (Australia) Luke Burt (10)
- Goals: (Australia) Luke Burt (62)
- Points: (Australia) Luke Burt (164)
← 2010	List of seasons	2012 →

The 2011 Parramatta Eels season is the 65th in the club's history. Coached by Stephen Kearney and captained by Nathan Hindmarsh, they competed in the NRL's 2011 Telstra Premiership. The Eels finished the regular season in 14th place, failing to make the finals for the second consecutive year.

== Summary ==
The Parramatta club made several new player signings for the 2011 season. In the forwards, the Eels added former Queensland centre Carl Webb and former Canterbury and Cronulla as well as one-time Kangaroo Reni Maitua. To bolster the backs after the retirement of Eric Grothe Jr and the departure of Timana Tahu, the Eels signed the experienced pair of Chris Walker and Chris Hicks.

2011 can be considered to have been a year of "almost" for Parramatta, with the team losing over half of their matches by four points or less, many of which were conceded after attaining leads over their opponents. The Eels pushed a record four games into Golden Point during the season, however were unable to win any, resulting in a draw against the St George Illawarra Dragons and one-point losses to the Penrith Panthers, Sydney Roosters and the Canterbury-Bankstown Bulldogs.

Throughout the 2011 season, coach Stephen Kearney motioned several reshuffles of the Parramatta side, the most high-profile change being fullback Jarryd Hayne's switch to five-eighth after his ball-playing abilities were considered by several experts including the NSW State of Origin coach Ricky Stuart, as his strongest point. Other switches include the moving of Luke Burt to fullback, second-rower Ben Smith to right centre, and the resting of five-eighth Daniel Mortimer.

Before the final match of their season, Parramatta had won only five of their 24 games and were in contention for the dreaded wooden spoon. During their final match, the Parramatta side emerged victorious over the Gold Coast Titans who were also direct contenders for last place. The wooden spoon was awarded to the Gold Coast side, finishing 16th on the NRL ladder with Parramatta finishing in 14th position.

== Standings ==
=== National Rugby League ===
2011 NRL Telstra Premiership
Pos.	Team	Pld	W	D	L	B	PF	PA	PD	Pts
1	Melbourne Storm	24	19	0	5	2	521	308	213	42
2	Manly Warringah Sea Eagles (P)	24	18	0	6	2	539	331	208	40
3	Brisbane Broncos	24	18	0	6	2	511	372	139	40
4	Wests Tigers	24	15	0	9	2	519	430	89	34
5	St. George Illawarra Dragons	24	14	1	9	2	483	341	142	33
6	New Zealand Warriors	24	14	0	10	2	504	393	111	32
7	North Queensland Cowboys	24	14	0	10	2	532	480	52	32
8	Newcastle Knights	24	12	0	12	2	478	443	35	28
9	Canterbury-Bankstown Bulldogs	24	12	0	12	2	449	489	-40	28
10	South Sydney Rabbitohs	24	11	0	13	2	531	562	-31	26
11	Sydney Roosters	24	10	0	14	2	417	500	-83	24
12	Penrith Panthers	24	9	0	15	2	430	517	-87	22
13	Cronulla-Sutherland Sharks	24	7	0	17	2	428	557	-129	18
14	Parramatta Eels	24	6	1	17	2	385	538	-153	17
15	Canberra Raiders	24	6	0	18	2	423	623	-200	16
16	Gold Coast Titans	24	6	0	18	2	363	629	-266	16

=== National Youth Competition ===
2011 National Youth Competition season
Pos.	Team	Pld	W	D	L	B	PF	PA	PD	Pts
1	New Zealand Warriors (P)	24	19	1	4	2	851	494	+357	43
2	North Queensland Cowboys	24	17	0	7	2	758	509	+249	38
3	Cronulla-Sutherland Sharks	24	16	1	7	2	707	600	+107	37
4	Melbourne Storm	24	16	0	8	2	678	517	+161	36
5	Sydney Roosters	24	15	1	8	2	639	523	+116	35
6	Canterbury-Bankstown Bulldogs	24	14	0	10	2	659	458	+201	32
7	Wests Tigers	24	12	2	10	2	607	529	+78	30
8	Newcastle Knights	24	12	1	11	2	638	660	-22	29
9	Brisbane Broncos	24	11	2	11	2	752	551	+201	28
10	Penrith Panthers	24	12	0	12	2	558	709	-151	28
11	St. George Illawarra Dragons	24	10	2	12	2	562	594	-32	26
12	Parramatta Eels	24	10	1	13	2	547	556	-9	25
13	Canberra Raiders	24	8	1	15	2	683	749	-66	21
14	Gold Coast Titans	24	5	1	18	2	467	779	-312	15
15	South Sydney Rabbitohs	24	4	1	19	2	454	881	-427	13
16	Manly Warringah Sea Eagles	24	4	0	20	2	432	843	-411	12

== Fixtures ==
=== Pre-season ===
Date	Opponent	Venue	Result	Score	Tries	Goals	Attendance	Report
12 February	New Zealand Warriors	Rotorua International Stadium, Rotorua	Loss	24–4	Lasalo	Nil	8,600	
19 February	Wests Tigers	Campbelltown Sports Stadium, Campbelltown	Win	10–30	Horo (2), Robson, McGuire, Hayne	Burt 2	12,761	
26 February	Penrith Panthers	CUA Stadium, Penrith	Win	0–30	Lasalo, B. Smith, Whatuira, Horo, M. Keating	Burt 5		

=== Home and away season ===
Date	Round	Opponent	Venue	Result	Score	Tries	Goals	Attendance	Report
12 March	Round 1	New Zealand Warriors	Eden Park, Auckland	Win	18–24	Burt (2), Hayne, Robson	Burt 4/5	38,405	
18 March	Round 2	Penrith Panthers	Parramatta Stadium, Parramatta	Loss	6–20	M. Keating	Burt 1/1	15,974	
25 March	Round 3	South Sydney	ANZ Stadium, Sydney	Loss	18–32	Moimoi, Robson, Walker	Burt 3/3	22,153	
2 April	Round 4	North Queensland Cowboys	Parramatta Stadium, Parramatta	Win	22–20	Burt (2), Morgan, Uaisele	Burt 3/4	12,226	
10 April	Round 5	Melbourne Storm	AAMI Park, Melbourne	Loss	38–0	Nil	Nil	11,805	
15 April	Round 6	Canterbury Bankstown Bulldogs	ANZ Stadium, Sydney	Loss	14–34	Hayne (2)	Burt 3/3	30,687	
24 April	Round 7	Gold Coast Titans	Parramatta Stadium, Parramatta	Win	22–18	Loko, Reddy, Robson, Shackleton	Burt 3/4	10,052	
1 May	Round 8	St George Illawarra Dragons	WIN Jubilee Stadium, Kogarah	Loss	30–0	Nil	Nil	19,319	
6–9 May	Round 9	Bye							
14 May	Round 10	North Queensland Cowboys	Dairy Farmers Stadium, Townsville	Loss	40–26	Hayne, Loko, McGuire, Reddy, B. Smith	Burt 3/5	13,610	
23 May	Round 11	Cronulla Sutherland Sharks	Parramatta Stadium, Parramatta	Win	40–6	Atkins (2), Burt (2), Horo, Walker, B. Smith	Burt 6/7	10,628	
28 May	Round 12	Newcastle Knights	Ausgrid Stadium, Newcastle	Loss	8–6	McGuire	Burt 1/1	18,723	
3 June	Round 13	St George Illawarra Dragons	Parramatta Stadium, Parramatta	Draw	14–14	Lasalo, Moimoi	Burt 3/3	16,066	
10–13 June	Round 14	Bye							
20 June	Round 15	Manly Warringah Sea Eagles	Brookvale Oval, Manly	Loss	22–18	Burt, Horo, Loko, B. Smith	Burt 1/4	13,959	
25 June	Round 16	Canberra Raiders	Canberra Stadium, Canberra	Loss	25–12	M. Keating, B. Smith	Burt 2/2	13,457	
1 July	Round 17	Brisbane Broncos	Parramatta Stadium, Parramatta	Loss	12–16	Burt (2)	Burt 2/2	11,079	
8 July	Round 18	Wests Tigers	Parramatta Stadium, Parramatta	Win	22–6	Atkins, Maitua, Morgan	Burt 5/5	19,654	
16 July	Round 19	Penrith Panthers	Centrebet Stadium, Penrith	Loss	23–22	Horo, Maitua, McGuire, Uaisele	Burt 3/4	17,333	
22 July	Round 20	Canterbury Bankstown Bulldogs	ANZ Stadium, Sydney	Loss	8–7	Hayne	Burt 1/1, Hayne FG: 1	15,126	
1 August	Round 21	Melbourne Storm	Parramatta Stadium, Parramatta	Loss	18–22	Lasalo, Maitua	Burt 5/5	10,078	
8 August	Round 22	South Sydney Rabbitohs	ANZ Stadium, Sydney	Loss	56–6	Burt	Burt 1/1	13,908	
13 August	Round 23	Manly Warringah Sea Eagles	Parramatta Stadium, Parramatta	Loss	26–20	Hicks, Horo, Morgan	Burt 4/5	11,102	
21 August	Round 24	Wests Tigers	Sydney Football Stadium, Sydney	Loss	31–12	Hicks, B. Smith	Burt 2/2	18,626	
26 August	Round 25	Sydney Roosters	Parramatta Stadium, Parramatta	Loss	12–13	Hayne, Hicks	Burt 2/2	12,097	
3 September	Round 26	Gold Coast Titans	Skilled Park, Robina	Win	12–32	Morgan (2), B. Smith (2), Hayne, Sio	Burt 4/6	18,265	

== Players and staff ==
The playing squad and coaching staff of the Parramatta Eels for the 2011 NRL season as of 29 May 2011.

Parramatta Eels
NRL Premiership Squad			Coaching staff
Mitchell Allgood – PR, SR; Jordan Atkins – WG, WG; Marmin Barba – FB, FE; Luke Burt – WG, FB; Karlos Filiga – CE; Jarryd Hayne – FB; Chris Hicks – WG; Nathan Hindmarsh (c) – SR; Justin Horo – SR; Tom Humble – HB, FB; Matt Keating – HK; Taniela Lasalo – SR; Jacob Loko – CE, SR	Manase Manuokafoa – PR; Casey McGuire – HK; Fuifui Moimoi – PR; Ryan Morgan – CE; Daniel Mortimer – FE, HB; Pat O'Hanlon – SR; Pele Peletelese – PR; Joseph Paulo – SR; Justin Poore – PR; Joel Reddy – CE; Jeff Robson – HB; Shane Shackleton – SR, LK; Ben Smith – SR, CE	Chris Walker – WG; Carl Webb – PR	Head coach: Stephen Kearney; Assistant coaches: Matthew Cameron (Toyota Cup head coach); Peter Sharp; Brad Arthur; Legend: (c) Captain(s); (vc) Vice-captain(s); Updated: 29 May 2011; Source(s): Player profiles, Coaching staff, Injury update, & the Rugby League Project

== Awards ==
The following awards were awarded in the post-season:

- Michael Cronin clubman of the year award: Les 'Tex' Brooker
- Ken Thornett Medal (Players' player): Fuifui Moimoi
- Jack Gibson Award (Coach's award): Fuifui Moimoi
- Eric Grothe Rookie of the Year Award: Mitchell Allgood
