= 2008 NRL season results =

Australia/New Zealand rugby league results

The 2008 National Rugby League season consisted of 26 weekly regular season rounds, starting on 14 March, followed by four weeks of play-offs, culminating in a grand final on 5 October.

== Regular season ==
Times for Rounds 1–3 were Australian Eastern Daylight Saving Time. Times for Round 4 and the remainder of the season were Australian Eastern Standard Time.

=== Round 1 ===
- This round marked the first premiership round of the centenary season of rugby league in Australia.
- Skilled Park on the Gold Coast became the 70th first-grade venue used, and was filled to capacity for its first NRL match with the Gold Coast Titans against the North Queensland Cowboys.
- The Titans' Jordan Atkins equalled the competition record of four tries on debut, emulating Johnno Stuntz (1908), Viv Farnsworth (1910), and Tony Nash (1942).
- The Bulldogs suffered their worst collapse when they led Parramatta 20–0 at halftime to lose 28–20 at ANZ Stadium, while that comeback was Parramatta's second largest.
- Brisbane's Corey Parker surpassed Darren Lockyer's and Michael De Vere's club record of most goals kicked in a match, scoring 10 goals out of 10.

| Home | Score | Away | Match information |
| Home | Score | Away | Date and time | Venue | Referee | Crowd |
|---|---|---|---|---|---|---|
| South Sydney Rabbitohs | 20-34 | Sydney Roosters | 14 March 2008, 7:30 pm | ANZ Stadium | Tony Archer | 29,386 |
| Gold Coast Titans | 36-18 | North Queensland Cowboys | 14 March 2008, 8:30 pm | Skilled Park | Shayne Hayne | 26,974 |
| Parramatta Eels | 28-20 | Bulldogs | 15 March 2008, 5:30 pm | ANZ Stadium | Jason Robinson | 25,065 |
| Manly-Warringah Sea Eagles | 10-16 | Cronulla Sharks | 15 March 2008, 7:30 pm | Brookvale Oval | Jared Maxwell | 15,424 |
| Newcastle Knights | 30-14 | Canberra Raiders | 15 March 2008, 7:30 pm | EnergyAustralia Stadium | Tony De Las Heras | 17,233 |
| Brisbane Broncos | 48-12 | Penrith Panthers | 16 March 2008, 2:00 pm | Suncorp Stadium | Gavin Badger | 31,250 |
| Wests Tigers | 24-16 | St George Illawarra Dragons | 16 March 2008, 3:00 pm | Sydney Football Stadium | Sean Hampstead | 18,211 |
| Melbourne Storm | 32-18 | New Zealand Warriors | 17 March 2008, 7:00 pm | Telstra Dome | Ben Cummins | 20,084 |

=== Round 2 ===
- Newcastle Knights and Manly-Warringah Sea Eagles played out the first golden point game of the season.
- The Melbourne Storm lost their 100th ever game and their first game at Olympic Park since round 24, 2006.
- Both of National Rugby League season 2007's grand finalists, Manly-Warringah Sea Eagles and the Melbourne Storm, were beaten this round both by one point by Newcastle and Cronulla.

| Home | Score | Away | Match information |
| Home | Score | Away | Date and time | Venue | Referee | Crowd |
|---|---|---|---|---|---|---|
| Sydney Roosters | 14-20 | Brisbane Broncos | 21 March 2008, 7:30 pm | Sydney Football Stadium | Jared Maxwell | 18,724 |
| South Sydney Rabbitohs | 12-25 | Bulldogs | 21 March 2008, 7:30 pm | ANZ Stadium | Sean Hampstead | 21,839 |
| Penrith Panthers | 16-20 | Canberra Raiders | 22 March 2008, 5:30 pm | CUA Stadium | Jason Robinson | 7,503 |
| Newcastle Knights | 13-12 | Manly-Warringah Sea Eagles | 22 March 2008, 7:30 pm | EnergyAustralia Stadium | Ben Cummins | 18,117 |
| North Queensland Cowboys | 10-30 | Wests Tigers | 22 March 2008, 9:30 pm | Dairy Farmers Stadium | Tony De Las Heras | 20,655 |
| New Zealand Warriors | 30-16 | Parramatta Eels | 23 March 2008, 2:00 pm | Mt Smart Stadium | Shayne Hayne | 15,250 |
| Melbourne Storm | 16-17 | Cronulla Sharks | 23 March 2008, 3:00 pm | Olympic Park Stadium | Tony Archer | 10,720 |
| St George Illawarra Dragons | 30-12 | Gold Coast Titans | 24 March 2008, 7:00 pm | WIN Stadium | Gavin Badger | 10,521 |

=== Round 3 ===
- All matches this round were won by home teams.
- A new Suncorp Stadium attendance record for premiership games was set with 50,612.
- Brisbane Broncos made it three wins from their first three matches of the season for the first time since 2003.
- Newcastle Knights played their second consecutive golden point game but lost to the Parramatta Eels.
- Melbourne Storm suffered their first back-to-back loss since rounds 3 and 4, 2006.
- Manly-Warringah Sea Eagles got their biggest ever win over the New Zealand Warriors.

| Home | Score | Away | Match information |
| Home | Score | Away | Date and time | Venue | Referee | Crowd |
|---|---|---|---|---|---|---|
| Brisbane Broncos | 36-2 | North Queensland Cowboys | 28 March 2008, 8:30 pm | Suncorp Stadium | Ben Cummins | 50,612 |
| Parramatta Eels | 24-23 | Newcastle Knights | 28 March 2008, 7:30 pm | Parramatta Stadium | Tony Archer | 15,176 |
| Sydney Roosters | 10-6 | Melbourne Storm | 29 March 2008, 5:30 pm | Sydney Football Stadium | Shayne Hayne | 12,137 |
| Canberra Raiders | 21-14 | St George Illawarra Dragons | 29 March 2008, 7:30 pm | Canberra Stadium | Gavin Badger | 14,400 |
| Gold Coast Titans | 18-4 | Cronulla Sharks | 29 March 2008, 9:30 pm | Skilled Park | Jason Robinson | 19,050 |
| Penrith Panthers | 26-22 | South Sydney Rabbitohs | 30 March 2008, 2:00 pm | CUA Stadium | Tony De Las Heras | 10,839 |
| Bulldogs | 32-12 | Wests Tigers | 30 March 2008, 3:00 pm | ANZ Stadium | Jared Maxwell | 21,546 |
| Manly-Warringah Sea Eagles | 52-6 | New Zealand Warriors | 31 March 2008, 7:00 pm | Brookvale Oval | Sean Hampstead | 10,175 |

=== Round 4 ===
- A new ANZ Stadium regular season attendance record (excluding double headers) was set when 36,526 came to the match between the Bulldogs and the Sydney Roosters.
- Golden point was invoked for the third time in 2008, the Cronulla v St. George Illawarra match going to extra time.
- The South Sydney Rabbitohs were the remaining team to yet win a game after falling for their fourth consecutive game against the Manly Sea Eagles, who managed to keep them tryless by 20 points to 2.
- The Sydney Roosters' and the Bulldogs' match was labelled the "Grudge Match of the Year", as many of the Roosters high-profile players were former Bulldogs and it was their first clash since forward Willie Mason left the Bulldogs for the Roosters. However the match was one-sided as the Roosters scored a 28-point victory. Braith Anasta, a former Bulldog, was named man of the match while Mason scored two tries.

| Home | Score | Away | Match information |
| Home | Score | Away | Date and time | Venue | Referee | Crowd |
|---|---|---|---|---|---|---|
| Bulldogs | 12-40 | Sydney Roosters | 4 April 2008, 7:30 pm | ANZ Stadium | Tony Archer | 36,526 |
| Melbourne Storm | 28-8 | Brisbane Broncos | 4 April 2008, 7:30 pm | Olympic Park Stadium | Jared Maxwell | 13,831 |
| St George Illawarra Dragons | 16-18 | Cronulla Sharks | 5 April 2008, 5:30 pm | ANZ Stadium | Sean Hampstead | 15,318 |
| Gold Coast Titans | 32-12 | Canberra Raiders | 5 April 2008, 7:30 pm | Skilled Park | Ben Cummins | 17,381 |
| North Queensland Cowboys | 38-14 | Parramatta Eels | 5 April 2008, 9:30 pm | Dairy Farmers Stadium | Bernard Sutton | 19,231 |
| New Zealand Warriors | 26-20 | Newcastle Knights | 6 April 2008, 2:00 pm | Mt Smart Stadium | Tony Le Las Heras | 11,518 |
| Manly-Warringah Sea Eagles | 20-2 | South Sydney Rabbitohs | 6 April 2008, 3:00 pm | Brookvale Oval | Shayne Hayne | 14,426 |
| Wests Tigers | 8-30 | Penrith Panthers | 7 April 2008, 7:00 pm | Campbelltown Stadium | Jason Robinson | 11,898 |

=== Round 5 ===
- For the fifth time in their ten-year history, St. George Illawarra Dragons started the season with one win and four losses.
- The New Zealand Warriors won their first match against the Bulldogs since the first week of the finals in 2003.
- Canberra Raiders won the inaugural 1989 League Legends Cup against the Wests Tigers.
- The Brisbane Broncos won their fourth straight match over the Newcastle Knights.

| Home | Score | Away | Match information |
| Home | Score | Away | Date and time | Venue | Referee | Crowd |
|---|---|---|---|---|---|---|
| Melbourne Storm | 26-4 | Manly-Warringah Sea Eagles | 11 April 2008, 7:30 pm | Olympic Park Stadium | Tony Archer | 13,632 |
| Parramatta Eels | 20-28 | Gold Coast Titans | 11 April 2008, 7:30 pm | Parramatta Stadium | Jared Maxwell | 13,321 |
| St George Illawarra Dragons | 16-20 | North Queensland Cowboys | 12 April 2008, 5:30 pm | WIN Stadium | Tony De Las Heras | 11,639 |
| Penrith Panthers | 12-28 | Sydney Roosters | 12 April 2008, 7:30 pm | CUA Stadium | Bernard Sutton | 16,294 |
| New Zealand Warriors | 36-16 | Bulldogs | 13 April 2008, 12:00 pm | Mt Smart Stadium | Ben Cummins | 15,912 |
| Canberra Raiders | 30-24 | Wests Tigers | 13 April 2008, 2:00 pm | Canberra Stadium | Sean Hampstead | 12,240 |
| Newcastle Knights | 22-34 | Brisbane Broncos | 13 April 2008, 3:00 pm | EnergyAustralia Stadium | Shayne Hayne | 21,614 |
| South Sydney Rabbitohs | 10-12 | Cronulla Sharks | 14 April 2008, 7:00 pm | ANZ Stadium | Jason Robinson | 12,998 |

=== Round 6: heritage round ===
This premiership round, the heritage round, was set down to celebrate the anniversary of the first round of the 1908 premiership. Teams wore jerseys reflecting their club or region's first season in the competition.

- Corey Parker played his 150th career game for the Brisbane Broncos.
- Cronulla played their first home game of the season after five rounds on the road when waiting for their home venue (Toyota Stadium) to be upgraded. It resulted in a golden point loss to Penrith.
- The Newcastle Knights put their season back into the positive after defeating the Sydney Roosters, bouncing back from a 20-12 half time deficit by scoring four tries within the remaining ten minutes.
- Melbourne win their twelfth straight match against Canberra after coming from 16-4 down at halftime.
- This round saw a change in the lead on the competition ladder, with the Gold coast Titans edging ahead of the Brisbane Broncos.

| Home | Score | Away | Match information |
| Home | Score | Away | Date and time | Venue | Referee | Crowd |
|---|---|---|---|---|---|---|
| Gold Coast Titans | 26-24 | Brisbane Broncos | 18 April 2008, 7:30 pm | Skilled Park | Tony Archer | 27,176 |
| Parramatta Eels | 16-20 | Manly-Warringah Sea Eagles | 18 April 2008, 7:30 pm | Parramatta Stadium | Shayne Hayne | 14,025 |
| Bulldogs | 30-18 | St George Illawarra Dragons | 19 April 2008, 5:30 pm | ANZ Stadium | Bernard Sutton | 14,767 |
| North Queensland Cowboys | 48-20 | New Zealand Warriors | 19 April 2008, 7:30 pm | Dairy Farmers Stadium | Jason Robinson | 20,554 |
| Cronulla Sharks | 20-21 | Penrith Panthers | 19 April 2008, 7:30 pm | Toyota Stadium | Sean Hampstead | 13,852 |
| Sydney Roosters | 20-34 | Newcastle Knights | 20 April 2008, 2:00 pm | Bluetongue Stadium | Steve Lyons | 14,176 |
| Wests Tigers | 30-10 | South Sydney Rabbitohs | 20 April 2008, 3:00 pm | Sydney Cricket Ground | Ben Cummins | 19,122 |
| Canberra Raiders | 16-23 | Melbourne Storm | 21 April 2008, 7:00 pm | Canberra Stadium | Jared Maxwell | 15,550 |

=== Round 7 ===
- South Sydney Rabbitohs lost their ninth consecutive match (from round 24, 2007), this time to the Brisbane Broncos. This was also Tonie Carroll's 200th game for the Broncos.
- The Dragons bounced back from their four-game slump, causing the Sydney Roosters' first back-to-back losses for this season.
- Gold Coast recorded their fifth successive win, becoming the first of any Gold Coast team in the top grade ever to do so.
- Wests Tigers extended their winning streak against Cronulla to nine.

| Home | Score | Away | Match information |
| Home | Score | Away | Date and time | Venue | Referee | Crowd |
|---|---|---|---|---|---|---|
| St George Illawarra Dragons | 26-6 | Sydney Roosters | 25 April 2008, 3:15 pm | ANZ Stadium | Sean Hampstead | 21,596 |
| Brisbane Broncos | 32-18 | South Sydney Rabbitohs | 25 April 2008, 7:45 pm | Suncorp Stadium | Jason Robinson | 34,112 |
| Manly-Warringah Sea Eagles | 30-22 | Bulldogs | 26 April 2008, 5:30 pm | Brookvale Oval | Tony Archer | 15,229 |
| North Queensland Cowboys | 10-12 | Melbourne Storm | 26 April 2008, 7:30 pm | Dairy Farmers Stadium | Gavin Badger | 24,053 |
| Gold Coast Titans | 36-24 | New Zealand Warriors | 27 April 2008, 2:00 pm | Skilled Park | Steve Lyons | 25,310 |
| Cronulla Sharks | 16-20 | Wests Tigers | 27 April 2008, 3:00 pm | Toyota Stadium | Shayne Hayne | 17,241 |
| Parramatta Eels | BYE | Newcastle Knights |
| Penrith Panthers | BYE | Canberra Raiders |

=== Round 8 ===
- The Newcastle Knights get their first win over the Gold Coast Titans with a thrilling 13-12 match.
- Referee Ben Cummins was hit by a foam football thrown by angry Penrith fans after the Parramatta Eels 26-18 win over the Panthers.
- The South Sydney Rabbitohs got their first win of the season.
- This round was followed by the 2008 ANZAC Test in what was the first test match played at the Sydney Cricket Ground since 1986.

| Home | Score | Away | Match information |
| Home | Score | Away | Date and time | Venue | Referee | Crowd |
|---|---|---|---|---|---|---|
| Newcastle Knights | 13-12 | Gold Coast Titans | 3 May 2008, 5:30 pm | EnergyAustralia Stadium | Gavin Badger | 21,280 |
| Penrith Panthers | 18-26 | Parramatta Eels | 3 May 2008, 7:30 pm | CUA Stadium | Ben Cummins | 18,724 |
| Wests Tigers | 22-34 | Brisbane Broncos | 3 May 2008, 8:30 pm | ANZ Stadium | Tony Archer | 11,177 |
| New Zealand Warriors | 14-6 | Canberra Raiders | 4 May 2008, 2:00 pm | Mt Smart Stadium | Sean Hampstead | 7,358 |
| South Sydney Rabbitohs | 28-24 | North Queensland Cowboys | 4 May 2008, 3:00 pm | ANZ Stadium | Shayne Hayne | 9,818 |
| Bulldogs | BYE | St George Illawarra Dragons |
| Manly-Warringah Sea Eagles | BYE | Sydney Roosters |
| Cronulla Sharks | BYE | Melbourne Storm |

=== Round 9 ===
- The 0-0 halftime scoreline during the Melbourne and Newcastle match was the fourth time in three years that the first half of an NRL match was scoreless.
- Melbourne's win over Newcastle placed the 2007 minor premiership winning Storm to the top of the table for the first time in 2008. Meanwhile, last year's second finishing team, the Sea Eagles, entered the top four.

| Home | Score | Away | Match information |
| Home | Score | Away | Date and time | Venue | Referee | Crowd |
|---|---|---|---|---|---|---|
| Sydney Roosters | 30-4 | Canberra Raiders | 10 May 2008, 5:30 pm | Sydney Football Stadium | Jason Robinson | 10,241 |
| Bulldogs | 4-30 | Penrith Panthers | 10 May 2008, 7:30 pm | ANZ Stadium | Jared Maxwell | 10,257 |
| North Queensland Cowboys | 18-24 | Cronulla Sharks | 10 May 2008, 7:30 pm | Dairy Farmers Stadium | Tony Archer | 17,065 |
| Brisbane Broncos | 12-30 | Manly-Warringah Sea Eagles | 11 May 2008, 2:00 pm | Suncorp Stadium | Shayne Hayne | 27,469 |
| Parramatta Eels | 19-18 | St George Illawarra Dragons | 11 May 2008, 3:00 pm | ANZ Stadium | Sean Hampstead | 16,313 |
| Melbourne Storm | 18-4 | Newcastle Knights | 12 May 2008, 7:00 pm | Olympic Park Stadium | Ben Cummins | 10,624 |
| South Sydney Rabbitohs | BYE | Gold Coast Titans |
| Wests Tigers | BYE | New Zealand Warriors |

=== Round 10 ===
- The 34 players selected for State of Origin were required to stand down for this round's club matches.
- The Gold Coast Titans finally defeated the Bulldogs, the first Gold Coast team of any era - Giants, Seagulls, Chargers or Titans - to do so.
- The Brisbane Broncos recorded their first back-to-back losses of the season.
- The St. George Illawarra Dragons defeated Melbourne for the first time since 2004. Up to eight players from the usual Melbourne squad were omitted from the match due to State of Origin duties.
- The Penrith Panthers made the top eight for the first time in 2008 by beating the Warriors.

| Home | Score | Away | Match information |
| Home | Score | Away | Date and time | Venue | Referee | Crowd |
|---|---|---|---|---|---|---|
| Parramatta Eels | 12-32 | Sydney Roosters | 16 May 2008, 7:45 pm | Parramatta Stadium | Shayne Hayne | 16,211 |
| Gold Coast Titans | 24-20 | Bulldogs | 16 May 2008, 7:45 pm | Skilled Park | Jason Robinson | 22,676 |
| Cronulla Sharks | 13-6 | Brisbane Broncos | 17 May 2008, 5:30 pm | Toyota Stadium | Jared Maxwell | 13,431 |
| St George Illawarra Dragons | 36-12 | Melbourne Storm | 17 May 2008, 7:30 pm | ANZ Stadium | Phil Haines | 6,881 |
| Manly-Warringah Sea Eagles | 38-6 | North Queensland Cowboys | 17 May 2008, 7:30 pm | Bluetongue Stadium | Ben Cummins | 9,343 |
| Penrith Panthers | 46-22 | New Zealand Warriors | 18 May 2008, 2:00 pm | CUA Stadium | Tony De Las Heras | 9,450 |
| Newcastle Knights | 26-38 | Wests Tigers | 18 May 2008, 3:00 pm | EnergyAustralia Stadium | Sean Hampstead | 20,154 |
| Canberra Raiders | 38-10 | South Sydney Rabbitohs | 19 May 2008, 7:00 pm | Canberra Stadium | Gavin Badger | 11,115 |

=== Round 11 ===
- The Warriors' loss to the Roosters was the first home game they lost in 2008.

| Home | Score | Away | Match information |
| Home | Score | Away | Date and time | Venue | Referee | Crowd |
|---|---|---|---|---|---|---|
| Manly-Warringah Sea Eagles | 18-20 | St George Illawarra Dragons | 23 May 2008 7:45 pm | Brookvale Oval | Jason Robinson | 12,058 |
| South Sydney Rabbitohs | 10-15 | Melbourne Storm | 24 May 2008 7:30 pm | Bluetongue Stadium | Jared Maxwell | 8,761 |
| New Zealand Warriors | 12-38 | Sydney Roosters | 25 May 2008 2:00 pm | Mt Smart Stadium | Ben Cummins | 11,922 |
| Wests Tigers | 20-18 | Gold Coast Titans | 25 May 2008 3:00 pm | Leichhardt Oval | Shayne Hayne | 17,493 |
| Bulldogs | 30-22 | Cronulla Sharks | 26 May 2008 7:00 pm | ANZ Stadium | Tony Archer | 9,289 |
| Brisbane Broncos | BYE | North Queensland Cowboys |
| Parramatta Eels | BYE | Newcastle Knights |
| Penrith Panthers | BYE | Canberra Raiders |

=== Round 12 ===
- Manly's Adam Cuthbertson was sent off during Manly's win over Canberra.
- Denan Kemp equalled the club record for most tries in a match for the Brisbane Broncos, with four, one of which was the match-winner scored after the final siren.
- The Bulldogs became the first team for 2008 to be held scoreless in a match.
- North Queensland's Luke O'Donnell was also sent off in the Cowboys loss to Penrith in golden point extra time.
- Brett Finch played his 200th NRL game. He became only the 5th player to reach this milestone before reaching the age of 27.

| Home | Score | Away | Match information |
| Home | Score | Away | Date and time | Venue | Referee | Crowd |
|---|---|---|---|---|---|---|
| Brisbane Broncos | 30-26 | Parramatta Eels | 30 May 2008, 7:45 pm | Suncorp Stadium | Jason Robinson | 25,564 |
| Canberra Raiders | 18-31 | Manly-Warringah Sea Eagles | 30 May 2008, 7:45 pm | Canberra Stadium | Sean Hampstead | 13,120 |
| Melbourne Storm | 46-0 | Bulldogs | 31 May 2008, 5:30 pm | Olympic Park Stadium | Shayne Hayne | 12,251 |
| North Queensland Cowboys | 18-19 | Penrith Panthers | 31 May 2008, 7:30 pm | Dairy Farmers Stadium | Alan Shortall | 16,553 |
| Newcastle Knights | 16-18 | New Zealand Warriors | 31 May 2008, 7:30 pm | EnergyAustralia Stadium | Jared Maxwell | 15,489 |
| South Sydney Rabbitohs | 12-26 | St George Illawarra Dragons | 1 June 2008, 2:00 pm | ANZ Stadium | Gavin Badger | 12,978 |
| Cronulla Sharks | 30-14 | Gold Coast Titans | 1 June 2008, 3:00 pm | Toyota Stadium | Ben Cummins | 8,214 |
| Sydney Roosters | 19-10 | Wests Tigers | 2 June 2008, 7:45 pm | Sydney Football Stadium | Tony Archer | 15,204 |

=== Round 13 ===
- Players selected for State of Origin were again absent from this round's fixtures.
- South Sydney's rare win over the Warriors was their first win against them since 1999.
- Wendell Sailor returned to the NRL with St. George Illawarra after a seven-year absence.
- The Sydney Roosters failed to score against Manly for the second time in a row, having lost 0-56 in Round 17, 2007.
- For the first time, the Gold Coast Titans held their opposition scoreless with an 18-0 win over the Melbourne Storm at Skilled Park, in the process maintaining their undefeated home record in 2008.

| Home | Score | Away | Match information |
| Home | Score | Away | Date and time | Venue | Referee | Crowd |
|---|---|---|---|---|---|---|
| St George Illawarra Dragons | 28-10 | Brisbane Broncos | 6 June 2008, 7:45 pm | ANZ Stadium | Ben Cummins | 11,234 |
| New Zealand Warriors | 28-35 | South Sydney Rabbitohs | 6 June 2008, 8:00 pm | Mt Smart Stadium | Tony De Las Heras | 13,112 |
| Bulldogs | 12-22 | Newcastle Knights | 7 June 2008, 5:30 pm | ANZ Stadium | Sean Hampstead | 9,565 |
| Wests Tigers | 40-16 | North Queensland Cowboys | 7 June 2008, 7:30 pm | Campbelltown Stadium | Gavin Badger | 10,488 |
| Parramatta Eels | 30-12 | Canberra Raiders | 7 June 2008, 7:30 pm | Parramatta Stadium | Alan Shortall | 10,195 |
| Penrith Panthers | 22-24 | Cronulla Sharks | 8 June 2008, 2:00 pm | CUA Stadium | Jared Maxwell | 10,543 |
| Manly-Warringah Sea Eagles | 42-0 | Sydney Roosters | 8 June 2008, 3:00 pm | Brookvale Oval | Shayne Hayne | 13,842 |
| Gold Coast Titans | 18-0 | Melbourne Storm | 9 June 2008, 7:00 pm | Skilled Park | Jason Robinson | 19,409 |

=== Round 14 ===
- For the first time since 2005, the Cronulla Sharks managed to win three consecutive games.
- The Cowboys lost their seventh consecutive match for the first time since 1999.

| Home | Score | Away | Match information |
| Home | Score | Away | Date and time | Venue | Referee | Crowd |
|---|---|---|---|---|---|---|
| Sydney Roosters | 32-12 | Penrith Panthers | 13 June 2008, 7:45 pm | Sydney Football Stadium | Sean Hampstead | 9,724 |
| Cronulla Sharks | 24-8 | New Zealand Warriors | 14 June 2008, 7:30 pm | Toyota Stadium | Ben Cummins | 9,023 |
| Canberra Raiders | 34-16 | Brisbane Broncos | 15 June 2008, 2:00 pm | Canberra Stadium | Jason Robinson | 11,157 |
| Wests Tigers | 6-44 | Parramatta Eels | 15 June 2008, 3:00 pm | ANZ Stadium | Tony Archer | 22,170 |
| North Queensland Cowboys | 18-30 | Newcastle Knights | 16 June 2008, 7:00 pm | Dairy Farmers Stadium | Shayne Hayne | 14,234 |
| Bulldogs | BYE | St George Illawarra Dragons |
| Manly-Warringah Sea Eagles | BYE | South Sydney Rabbitohs |
| Melbourne Storm | BYE | Gold Coast Titans |

=== Round 15 ===
- Both Friday night games were won by the home teams by one point, so both avoided heading into extra time.
- The Bulldogs suffered their second thrashing in five weeks, this time 18-58 by Canberra, the most points the Bulldogs had ever conceded in 49 seasons (since 1959).
- The Cowboys suffered their 8th loss in a row, this time going down 48-20 to the Melbourne Storm in Melbourne, and were in grave danger along with South Sydney for wooden spoon contenders.
- The Roosters maintained their seven-year undefeated streak in Newcastle, grittingly winning 16-14.
- The Sharks ended Parramatta's clean run with their Toyota Park Stadium. However, this resulted in Cronulla losing their key man and Blues five-eighth Greg Bird, having been injured in Cronulla's 16-14 win over Parramatta.
- South Sydney earned their third win of the season in a tough affair with Gold Coast 24-23 with only a penalty goal from Isaac Luke putting them in front into full-time. Their win saw the Rabbitohs move out of last place for the first time this season after 15 rounds, slipping North Queensland to their long-held position.

| Home | Score | Away | Match information |
| Home | Score | Away | Date and time | Venue | Referee | Crowd |
|---|---|---|---|---|---|---|
| Brisbane Broncos | 19-18 | Wests Tigers | 20 June 2008, 7:45 pm | Suncorp Stadium | Sean Hampstead | 27,864 |
| St George Illawarra Dragons | 13-12 | Penrith Panthers | 20 June 2008, 7:45 pm | ANZ Stadium | Jared Maxwell | 9,032 |
| Bulldogs | 18-58 | Canberra Raiders | 21 June 2008, 5:30 pm | ANZ Stadium | Gavin Badger | 9,845 |
| Melbourne Storm | 48-20 | North Queensland Cowboys | 21 June 2008, 7:30 pm | Olympic Park Stadium | Bernard Sutton | 10,880 |
| New Zealand Warriors | 14-20 | Manly-Warringah Sea Eagles | 22 June 2008, 2:00 pm | Mt Smart Stadium | Tony De Las Heras | 7,141 |
| Newcastle Knights | 14-16 | Sydney Roosters | 22 June 2008, 2:00 pm | EnergyAustralia Stadium | Tony Archer | 19,253 |
| Cronulla Sharks | 16-14 | Parramatta Eels | 22 June 2008, 3:00 pm | Toyota Stadium | Shayne Hayne | 17,547 |
| South Sydney Rabbitohs | 24-23 | Gold Coast Titans | 23 June 2008, 7:00 pm | ANZ Stadium | Steve Lyons | 9,827 |

=== Round 16 ===
- Once again, players selected for State of Origin duties were unable to play in this round.
- The Penrith Panthers and the Brisbane Broncos played out the first draw of the season, and the sixth golden point game.
- The Gold Coast Titans finally lost at home, going down to the St George Illawarra Dragons.
- The South Sydney Rabbitohs equalled the second-biggest ever comeback in rugby league history, coming from 24 points down to win by a point against wooden spoon contenders the North Queensland Cowboys at Dairy Farmers Stadium.
- The New Zealand Warriors defeated the Wests Tigers at Leichhardt Oval for the first time in the Warriors' history.
- The Parramatta Eels' win over the Melbourne Storm was their first since 2005, and first at home since 2001.
- The Cronulla Sharks maintained their four-year unbeaten streak against the Canberra Raiders at Canberra Stadium.

| Home | Score | Away | Match information |
| Home | Score | Away | Date and time | Venue | Referee | Crowd |
|---|---|---|---|---|---|---|
| Sydney Roosters | 24-14 | Bulldogs | 27 June 2008, 7:45 pm | Sydney Football Stadium | Jared Maxwell | 9,271 |
| Penrith Panthers | 12-12 | Brisbane Broncos | 27 June 2008, 7:45 pm | CUA Stadium | Gavin Badger | 9,967 |
| Gold Coast Titans | 22-26 | St George Illawarra Dragons | 28 June 2008, 5:30 pm | Skilled Park | Bernard Sutton | 26,453 |
| Manly-Warringah Sea Eagles | 28-12 | Newcastle Knights | 28 June 2008, 7:30 pm | Bluetongue Stadium | Shayne Hayne | 13,798 |
| North Queensland Cowboys | 28-29 | South Sydney Rabbitohs | 28 June 2008, 7:30 pm | Dairy Farmers Stadium | Tony De Las Heras | 15,631 |
| Wests Tigers | 26-28 | New Zealand Warriors | 29 June 2008, 2:00 pm | Leichhardt Oval | Steve Lyons | 15,027 |
| Parramatta Eels | 24-22 | Melbourne Storm | 29 June 2008, 3:00 pm | Parramatta Stadium | Ben Cummins | 12,597 |
| Canberra Raiders | 24-36 | Cronulla Sharks | 30 June 2008, 7:00 pm | Canberra Stadium | Sean Hampstead | 9,136 |

=== Round 17 ===
- The Dragons protected their five-year unbeaten streak in Newcastle with a 24–16 victory over the Knights, which was also St George Illawarra's seventh consecutive victory.
- The Melbourne Storm won their 13th straight match against the Canberra Raiders, ensuring their coach Craig Bellamy was unbeaten as coach against his old club.
- Penrith's win over Parramatta was somewhat soured when Penrith captain Petero Civoniceva was racially taunted by Eels fans at Parramatta Stadium.
- For the second week in a row, the South Sydney Rabbitohs came back to win, this time coming from 18 points down early in the second half against the Bulldogs in extra time, scoring four consecutive games for the first time in 14 years.

| Home | Score | Away | Match information |
| Home | Score | Away | Date and time | Venue | Referee | Crowd |
|---|---|---|---|---|---|---|
| Gold Coast Titans | 14-34 | Manly-Warringah Sea Eagles | 4 July 2008, 7:45 pm | Skilled Park | Jared Maxwell | 21,374 |
| Newcastle Knights | 16-24 | St George Illawarra Dragons | 5 July 2008, 7:30 pm | EnergyAustralia Stadium | Sean Hampstead | 22,348 |
| Melbourne Storm | 30-14 | Canberra Raiders | 6 July 2008, 2:00 pm | Olympic Park Stadium | Ben Cummins | 11,719 |
| Parramatta Eels | 16-22 | Penrith Panthers | 6 July 2008, 3:00 pm | Parramatta Stadium | Shayne Hayne | 14,459 |
| Bulldogs | 30-34 | South Sydney Rabbitohs | 7 July 2008, 7:00 pm | ANZ Stadium | Jason Robinson | 15,562 |
| Brisbane Broncos | BYE | North Queensland Cowboys |
| Sydney Roosters | BYE | Cronulla Sharks |
| Wests Tigers | BYE | New Zealand Warriors |

=== Round 18 ===
- The Gold Coast Titans beat the Sydney Roosters at the Sydney Football Stadium, becoming the first Gold Coast team of any era to do so.
- The New Zealand Warriors condemned the North Queensland Cowboys to their record 10th loss in succession.
- South Sydney won their fifth match in succession for the first time since 1994.
- The Manly-Warringah Sea Eagles took the outright top spot on the NRL ladder after beating the Cronulla Sharks at Toyota Stadium.
- The St George Illawarra Dragons were, for the second time in three years, denied a record-equalling 8th-straight victory when they succumbed to the Canberra Raiders, who won their first match at WIN Stadium since 1995.
- Darren Lockyer made a successful comeback for the Brisbane Broncos, who suffered a defeat to the Bulldogs.
- Wests Tigers captain Brett Hodgson, the only remaining player to have played for the now merged Western Suburbs Magpies club, played his last ever match at Campbelltown Stadium. The team wore the iconic black-and-white Magpies uniform to celebrate this occasion.
- During the Monday night match with the Tigers, Melbourne Storm veteran Matt Geyer became the first Storm player to play 250 games for the club.

| Home | Score | Away | Match information |
| Home | Score | Away | Date and time | Venue | Referee | Crowd |
|---|---|---|---|---|---|---|
| Penrith Panthers | 18-30 | Newcastle Knights | 11 July 2008, 7:45 pm | CUA Stadium | Gavin Badger | 10,029 |
| Sydney Roosters | 28-32 | Gold Coast Titans | 11 July 2008, 7:45 pm | Sydney Football Stadium | Ben Cummins | 10,762 |
| New Zealand Warriors | 24-14 | North Queensland Cowboys | 12 July 2008, 5:30 pm | Mt Smart Stadium | Sean Hampstead | 7,722 |
| Cronulla Sharks | 6-34 | Manly-Warringah Sea Eagles | 12 July 2008, 7:30 pm | Toyota Stadium | Jason Robinson | 18,217 |
| South Sydney Rabbitohs | 32-20 | Parramatta Eels | 12 July 2008, 7:30 pm | ANZ Stadium | Matt Cecchin | 17,897 |
| St George Illawarra Dragons | 12-19 | Canberra Raiders | 13 July 2008, 2:00 pm | WIN Stadium | Tony De Las Heras | 14,040 |
| Brisbane Broncos | 18-26 | Bulldogs | 13 July 2008, 3:00 pm | Suncorp Stadium | Tony Archer | 37,683 |
| Wests Tigers | 18-30 | Melbourne Storm | 14 July 2008, 7:00 pm | Campbelltown Stadium | Jared Maxwell | 16,653 |

=== Round 19 ===
- North Queensland's eleventh consecutive loss was the worst such streak in the club's history.
- The Manly Sea Eagles beat the Parramatta Eels despite losing captain/halfback Matt Orford, five-eighth Jamie Lyon and forwards Jason King and Luke Williamson. Lyon and King were injured early in the first half (Orford and Williamson had been ruled unfit to play before the game).
- The Warriors posted just their third away win of 2008 by thumping the Bulldogs by 40 points to 22 to achieve their first win over the Bulldogs at ANZ Stadium.
- Dragons prop Jason Ryles became the fourth player to be sent off this season for intentionally kicking Storm prop Jeff Lima. Melbourne's Billy Slater and Adam Blair and Dragons' Jamie Soward were also sin-binned for fighting. St. George Illawarra failed to score for the first time since Round 3, 2000 – a scoring streak of 219 matches.
- Gavin Badger was dropped from refereeing for the following week as a result of several bad decisions in the Melbourne Storm – St. George Illawarra game.

| Home | Score | Away | Match information |
| Home | Score | Away | Date and time | Venue | Referee | Crowd |
|---|---|---|---|---|---|---|
| North Queensland Cowboys | 18-32 | Brisbane Broncos | 18 July 2008, 7:35 pm | Dairy Farmers Stadium | Ben Cummins | 22,048 |
| Manly-Warringah Sea Eagles | 28-10 | Parramatta Eels | 18 July 2008, 7:35 pm | Brookvale Oval | Shayne Hayne | 18,970 |
| Gold Coast Titans | 22-36 | Penrith Panthers | 19 July 2008, 5:30 pm | Skilled Park | Matt Cecchin | 17,759 |
| Bulldogs | 22-40 | New Zealand Warriors | 19 July 2008, 7:30 pm | ANZ Stadium | Tony De Las Heras | 12,973 |
| Cronulla Sharks | 16-13 | Newcastle Knights | 19 July 2008, 7:30 pm | Toyota Stadium | Tony Archer | 10,112 |
| Canberra Raiders | 34-12 | Sydney Roosters | 20 July 2008, 2:00 pm | Canberra Stadium | Jarred Maxwel | 13,417 |
| South Sydney Rabbitohs | 12-36 | Wests Tigers | 20 July 2008, 3:00 pm | ANZ Stadium | Jason Robinson | 21,818 |
| Melbourne Storm | 26-0 | St George Illawarra Dragons | 21 July 2008, 7:00 pm | Olympic Park Stadium | Gavin Badger | 9,335 |

=== Round 20 ===
- All matches on this round were won by the home teams.
- Top two sides Melbourne and Manly were beaten by 2 and 22 points respectively.
- The St. George Illawarra Dragons defeated the Bulldogs for the first time since 2003. Future Dally M Medallist and Sharks 2016 premiership player Ben Barba made his NRL debut for the Bulldogs in this match.
- There were four games with crowds under 10,000.

| Home | Score | Away | Match information |
| Home | Score | Away | Date and time | Venue | Referee | Crowd |
|---|---|---|---|---|---|---|
| Parramatta Eels | 16-4 | North Queensland Cowboys | 25 July 2008, 7:35 pm | Parramatta Stadium | Steve Lyons | 7,253 |
| Brisbane Broncos | 18-12 | Cronulla Sharks | 25 July 2008, 7:35 pm | Suncorp Stadium | Shayne Hayne | 27,905 |
| Canberra Raiders | 46-4 | Gold Coast Titans | 26 July 2008, 5:30 pm | Canberra Stadium | Tony De Las Heras | 8,700 |
| Penrith Panthers | 24-10 | Wests Tigers | 26 July 2008, 7:30 pm | CUA Stadium | Tony Archer | 14,075 |
| New Zealand Warriors | 8-6 | Melbourne Storm | 27 July 2008, 12:00 pm | Mt Smart Stadium | Jarred Maxwell | 8,752 |
| Newcastle Knights | 39-12 | South Sydney Rabbitohs | 27 July 2008, 2:00 pm | EnergyAustralia Stadium | Ben Cummins | 23,182 |
| Sydney Roosters | 34-12 | Manly-Warringah Sea Eagles | 27 July 2008, 3:00 pm | Sydney Football Stadium | Jason Robinson | 22,681 |
| St George Illawarra Dragons | 30-0 | Bulldogs | 28 July 2008, 7:00 pm | ANZ Stadium | Sean Hampstead | 7,802 |

=== Round 21 ===
- The Sharks defeated the Dragons for the fourth consecutive time.
- The Cowboys lost their 13th match in succession, leading up to a possible wooden spoon battle with the Bulldogs.
- The Wests Tigers equalled their 2005 record for best victory (54-2) by beating the Bulldogs 56-4.

| Home | Score | Away | Match information |
| Home | Score | Away | Date and time | Venue | Referee | Crowd |
|---|---|---|---|---|---|---|
| Melbourne Storm | 44-4 | Gold Coast Titans | 1 August 2008, 7:35 pm | Olympic Park Stadium | Tony De Las Heras | 9,400 |
| Manly-Warringah Sea Eagles | 30-10 | Penrith Panthers | 1 August 2008, 7:35 pm | Brookvale Oval | Shayne Hayne | 7,862 |
| Cronulla Sharks | 13-12 | St George Illawarra Dragons | 2 August 2008, 5:30 pm | Toyota Stadium | Jared Maxwell | 18,256 |
| South Sydney Rabbitohs | 18-16 | New Zealand Warriors | 2 August 2008, 7:30 pm | ANZ Stadium | Steve Lyons | 9,276 |
| North Queensland Cowboys | 20-32 | Sydney Roosters | 2 August 2008, 7:30 pm | Dairy Farmers Stadium | Sean Hampstead | 14,061 |
| Wests Tigers | 56-4 | Bulldogs | 3 August 2008, 2:00 pm | ANZ Stadium | Ben Cummins | 16,121 |
| Brisbane Broncos | 34-6 | Canberra Raiders | 3 August 2008, 3:00 pm | Suncorp Stadium | Tony Archer | 28,103 |
| Newcastle Knights | 32-12 | Parramatta Eels | 4 August 2008, 7:00 pm | Energy Australia Stadium | Jason Robinson | 16,435 |

=== Round 22 ===
- Melbourne's victory over Manly was their first win at Brookvale Oval since 1999, and their third straight against the Sea-Eagles.
- North Queensland ended a 13-game losing streak with a win over the Bulldogs.
- The Canberra Raiders recorded their highest score in a match, beating the previous best of 68, set in 1993, it was the equal 3rd highest score in history and the highest score by any team since 2003 when Parramatta also scored 74. Raiders' five-eighth Terry Campese scored 36 points (four tries and 10 goals), a feat bettered only three times in history.
- The Eels and Roosters contested the inaugural Jack Gibson Cup this round, with Parramatta claiming the trophy.

| Home | Score | Away | Match information |
| Home | Score | Away | Date and time | Venue | Referee | Crowd |
|---|---|---|---|---|---|---|
| Manly-Warringah Sea Eagles | 10-16 | Melbourne Storm | 8 August 2008, 7:35 pm | Brookvale Oval | Tony Archer | 18,442 |
| St George Illawarra Dragons | 10-18 | Wests Tigers | 8 August 2008, 7:35 pm | WIN Stadium | Shayne Hayne | 14,207 |
| New Zealand Warriors | 16-12 | Brisbane Broncos | 9 August 2008, 5:30 pm | Mt Smart Stadium | Sean Hampstead | 13,007 |
| Bulldogs | 12-36 | North Queensland Cowboys | 9 August 2008, 7:30 pm | Suncorp Stadium | Bernard Sutton | 8,549 |
| Cronulla Sharks | 28-14 | South Sydney Rabbitohs | 9 August 2008, 7:30 pm | Toyota Stadium | Ben Cummins | 12,618 |
| Canberra Raiders | 74-12 | Penrith Panthers | 10 August 2008, 2:00 pm | Canberra Stadium | Jason Robinson | 6,500 |
| Sydney Roosters | 24-28 | Parramatta Eels | 10 August 2008, 3:00 pm | Sydney Football Stadium | Jared Maxwell | 12,468 |
| Gold Coast Titans | 12-32 | Newcastle Knights | 11 August 2008, 7:00 pm | Skilled Park | Steve Lyons | 15,136 |

=== Round 23 ===
- The St George Illawarra Dragons recorded their seventh-straight victory over the Brisbane Broncos, with ex-Bronco Wendell Sailor scoring his first NRL try since he switched to rugby union against his former club.
- The Gold Coast Titans got one step closer to completing a clean sweep over the fellow Queensland teams in the competition this season, beating the North Queensland Cowboys.
- Manly-Warringah conceded more than 40 points in a match for the first time since 2005. This was also South Sydney's highest score achieved under coach Jason Taylor.
- Parramatta's win over the Wests Tigers brought them to eight consecutive wins against their opposing club.
- After the completion of round 23, the Melbourne Storm reclaimed the top spot on the competition ladder, taking advantage of Manly's loss to Souths.
- Panthers Vs Bulldogs became the longest match without extra time due to referee Gavin Badger's referrals to video referee Russell Smith.

| Home | Score | Away | Match information |
| Home | Score | Away | Date and time | Venue | Referee | Crowd |
|---|---|---|---|---|---|---|
| Melbourne Storm | 30-6 | Sydney Roosters | 15 August 2008, 7:35 pm | Olympic Park Stadium | Shayne Hayne | 13,335 |
| Brisbane Broncos | 20-24 | St George Illawarra Dragons | 15 August 2008, 7:35 pm | Suncorp Stadium | Jared Maxwell | 33,237 |
| New Zealand Warriors | 18-4 | Cronulla Sharks | 16 August 2008, 5:30 pm | Mt Smart Stadium | Tony Archer | 10,417 |
| North Queensland Cowboys | 20-26 | Gold Coast Titans | 16 August 2008, 7:30 pm | Dairy Farmers Stadium | Bernard Sutton | 17,065 |
| Penrith Panthers | 52-16 | Bulldogs | 16 August 2008, 7:30 pm | CUA Stadium | Gavin Badger | 7,841 |
| Canberra Raiders | 38-18 | Newcastle Knights | 17 August 2008, 2:00 pm | Canberra Stadium | Ben Cummins | 12,206 |
| South Sydney Rabbitohs | 40-32 | Manly-Warringah Sea Eagles | 17 August 2008, 3:00 pm | ANZ Stadium | Steve Lyons | 11,114 |
| Parramatta Eels | 40-12 | Wests Tigers | 18 August 2008, 7:00 pm | Parramatta Stadium | Matt Cecchin | 13,065 |

=== Round 24 ===
- For the second time this season, the Sydney Roosters were held scoreless, against a top four team.
- For the second consecutive time at Suncorp Stadium, the Brisbane Broncos and Gold Coast Titans were brought into golden point, with the Broncos taking out both games. This denied the Titans a complete clean sweep over their fellow Queensland teams.
- The NRL schedule staged its first double-header since Round 1 of the 2004 season. ANZ Stadium featured both the Wests Tigers vs Manly-Warringah Sea Eagles match, and the Bulldogs vs Parramatta Eels game, in sequence with one another on Saturday night, 23 August 2008.
- After trailing 19–6 at halftime, the Canberra Raiders tallied 34 points in the second half to stun the South Sydney Rabbitohs 25–40.
- The New Zealand Warriors' poor record at Wollongong's WIN Stadium continued as they had not won at that ground since 1996.
- Melbourne won their first match at CUA Stadium since 2003.

| Home | Score | Away | Match information |
| Home | Score | Away | Date and time | Venue | Referee | Crowd |
|---|---|---|---|---|---|---|
| Cronulla Sharks | 20-0 | Sydney Roosters | 22 August 2008, 7:35 pm | Toyota Stadium | Jason Robinson | 10,013 |
| Brisbane Broncos | 25-21 | Gold Coast Titans | 22 August 2008, 7:35 pm | Suncorp Stadium | Ben Cummins | 39,757 |
| Wests Tigers | 16-48 | Manly-Warringah Sea Eagles | 23 August 2008, 5:30 pm | ANZ Stadium | Tony Archer | 27,564 |
| Bulldogs | 12-26 | Parramatta Eels | 23 August 2008, 7:30 pm | ANZ Stadium | Steve Lyons | 27,564 |
| Newcastle Knights | 38-24 | North Queensland Cowboys | 23 August 2008, 7:30 pm | EnergyAustralia Stadium | Sean Hampstead | 10,323 |
| South Sydney Rabbitohs | 25-40 | Canberra Raiders | 24 August 2008, 2:00 pm | ANZ Stadium | Jared Maxwell | 10,128 |
| St George Illawarra Dragons | 34-6 | New Zealand Warriors | 24 August 2008, 3:00 pm | WIN Stadium | Shayne Hayne | 11,583 |
| Penrith Panthers | 6-40 | Melbourne Storm | 25 August 2008, 7:00 pm | CUA Stadium | Matt Cecchin | 8,813 |

=== Round 25 ===
- After nine previous meetings, the Cronulla Sharks defeated the Wests Tigers for the first time since 2003.
- The Canterbury Bulldogs suffered their 7th straight loss in a game to farewell long time Bulldogs hooker Corey Hughes.
- Wendell Sailor scored his first NRL hat-trick since 2001.
- The Cowboys broke the Raiders' top four hopes.
- Steve Menzies played his last Premiership match at Brookvale Oval.
- The Brisbane Broncos won their fifth match in a row at ANZ Stadium.

| Home | Score | Away | Match information |
| Home | Score | Away | Date and time | Venue | Referee | Crowd |
|---|---|---|---|---|---|---|
| Sydney Roosters | 22-20 | South Sydney Rabbitohs | 29 August 2008, 7:35 pm | Sydney Football Stadium | Steve Lyons | 18,127 |
| Wests Tigers | 6-32 | Cronulla Sharks | 29 August 2008, 7:35 pm | Leichhardt Oval | Sean Hampstead | 10,766 |
| Newcastle Knights | 17-16 | Melbourne Storm | 30 August 2008, 5:30 pm | EnergyAustralia Stadium | Shayne Hayne | 19,568 |
| North Queensland Cowboys | 22-10 | Canberra Raiders | 30 August 2008, 7:30 pm | Dairy Farmers Stadium | Matt Cecchin | 14,981 |
| St George Illawarra Dragons | 40-14 | Parramatta Eels | 30 August 2008, 7:30 pm | ANZ Stadium | Tony Archer | 17,103 |
| New Zealand Warriors | 42-20 | Penrith Panthers | 31 August 2008, 2:00 pm | Mt Smart Stadium | Ben Cummins | 15,214 |
| Bulldogs | 22-36 | Brisbane Broncos | 31 August 2008, 3:00 pm | ANZ Stadium | Jared Maxwell | 7,685 |
| Manly-Warringah Sea Eagles | 28-10 | Gold Coast Titans | 1 September 2008, 7:00 pm | Brookvale Oval | Jason Robinson | 14,755 |

=== Round 26 ===
- Wayne Bennett celebrated his last regular season game as the Broncos coach after 21 years of coaching them since their opening season in 1988. Defender Tonie Carroll also celebrated playing his last regular season game for the Broncos after serving for twelve seasons and playing over 200 games for the maroon-and-golds. The Broncos also recorded their fifth straight win over the Knights, knocking them out of finals contention.
- The Sydney Roosters' physical 10–0 win over St. George Illawarra Dragons saw them make the finals for the first time since 2004 when they finished as runners-up to the Bulldogs. It was also the first time the Roosters had held an opposing team scoreless since 2004.
- The New Zealand Warriors' finals-earning win over the Eels at Parramatta Stadium was their first win at Parramatta since the club's first season in 1995.
- The Tigers levelled their all-time record against the Gold Coast Titans by beating them 28–12, having already beaten them 20–18 in round 11.
- The Bulldogs picked up their first wooden spoon since 2002, when they were controversially stripped of 37 points for their salary-cap breach.
- The Melbourne Storm racked up their record third consecutive minor premiership for the first time in the NRL competition, taking hold of pole position in seasons 2006, 2007 and now 2008, a feat which had not been seen since Manly did so in 1995, 96, and 97. The game also commemorated Melbourne's longest serving player, Matt Geyer, who played his last regular season game to defeat the South Sydney Rabbitohs at Olympic Park Stadium in Melbourne 42–4.
- The Canberra Raiders scored 52 against the Bulldogs, the second time in the season the Raiders had put 50 or more on the Bulldogs (following the 58-18 demolition job in Round 15). They were the 6th team in history to achieve this feat, and the first team since Parramatta did it to Newtown in 1983. This was the second time the Bulldogs had been on the receiving end of this feat, the other being in their debut season, 1935.
- The Parramatta and Warriors games drew 5,102 people, the lowest crowd of the season.

| Home | Score | Away | Match information |
| Home | Score | Away | Date and time | Venue | Referee | Crowd |
|---|---|---|---|---|---|---|
| Brisbane Broncos | 24-2 | Newcastle Knights | 5 September 2008, 7:35 pm | Suncorp Stadium | Tony Archer | 37,552 |
| Sydney Roosters | 10-0 | St George Illawarra Dragons | 5 September 2008, 7:35 pm | Sydney Football Stadium | Shayne Hayne | 14,127 |
| Penrith Panthers | 16-34 | Manly-Warringah Sea Eagles | 6 September 2008, 5:30 pm | CUA Stadium | Jared Maxwell | 6,086 |
| Parramatta Eels | 6-28 | New Zealand Warriors | 6 September 2008, 7:30 pm | Parramatta Stadium | Jason Robinson | 5,102 |
| Cronulla Sharks | 28-22 | North Queensland Cowboys | 6 September 2008, 7:30 pm | Toyota Stadium | Ben Cummins | 7,057 |
| Canberra Raiders | 52-34 | Bulldogs | 7 September 2008, 2:00 pm | Canberra Stadium | Sean Hampstead | 15,411 |
| Gold Coast Titans | 12-28 | Wests Tigers | 7 September 2008, 3:00 pm | Skilled Park | Bernard Sutton | 20,723 |
| Melbourne Storm | 42-4 | South Sydney Rabbitohs | 7 September 2008, 7:00 pm | Olympic Park Stadium | Steve Lyons | 13,875 |

== Finals ==
The NRL employs the McIntyre final eight system.

- In the qualifying finals, matches were played at the higher placed team's home ground. 1st and 2nd highest placed winning teams proceeded to the preliminary finals.
- In the semifinals, matches were played at the 3rd and 4th highest winning team's home ground, provided it had a capacity of 25,000. Eligible venues were Stadium Australia, Sydney Football Stadium, Suncorp Stadium, Dairy Farmers Stadium, EnergyAustralia Stadium, Canberra Stadium, Telstra Dome, Melbourne Cricket Ground and Mount Smart Stadium.
- In the preliminary finals, matches were played at the highest placed winning teams from the qualifying finals' "home region" ground. For Sydney teams, Newcastle, St. George Illawarra and Canberra, this was the Sydney Football Stadium or Stadium Australia. For Brisbane and the Gold Coast it was Suncorp Stadium; for North Queensland it was Dairy Farmers Stadium; for Melbourne it was the Telstra Dome or the MCG; and for New Zealand it was Mt Smart Stadium.
- Melbourne Storm and Manly-Warringah Sea Eagles finished first and second for the second year running. Brisbane Broncos and New Zealand Warriors were the only other teams which had visited the finals series in the previous year.
- The Broncos played in their 17th successive finals campaign, second only to St. George's streak of 23 seasons from 1951 to 1973.

Qualifying finals
1 | Melbourne | 15
8 | New Zealand | 18
2 | Manly | 38
7 | St. George Illawarra | 6
3 | Cronulla | 36
6 | Canberra | 10
4 | Sydney | 16
5 | Brisbane | 24

Semifinals
4W | New Zealand | 30
2L | Sydney | 13
3W | Brisbane | 14
1L | Melbourne | 16

Preliminary finals
1W | Manly | 32
New Zealand | 6
2W | Cronulla | 0
Melbourne | 28

Final
Manly | 40
Melbourne | 0

=== Qualifying finals ===
- The Sydney Roosters made a return to the finals after a three-year absence, their last being in 2004 when they were runners-up to the now wooden-spooned Bulldogs.
- The Cronulla-Sutherland Sharks revisited the finals series since 2005 and hosted a home final for the first time since 2001, in which they comfortably defeated the Canberra Raiders.
- Both Melbourne and Manly faced sides that had defeated them during the season and held some records against the top two teams this year. Manly took on the 7th ranked St. George Illawarra Dragons, who defeated Manly at Brookvale Oval 20-18 in round 11, and had won four of their past six games at Brookvale Oval, while Melbourne faced the Warriors, who were recently outdone against the New Zealand club in Auckland by a mere 8-6 and were one of the two teams in the past three years that have defeated the Storm at Melbourne.
- Cronulla's defeat over the Canberra Raiders gave them their seventh consecutive finals defeat, last achieving a finals victory in 2000.
- The New Zealand Warriors' striking last-minute win over Melbourne made them the first 8th-placed team to defeat the season's minor premiers at their home ground in NRL history since the McIntyre system was introduced in 1999. This landmark win earned them a home final against the Sydney Roosters.

| Home | Score | Away | Match information |
| Home | Score | Away | Date and time | Venue | Referee | Crowd |
|---|---|---|---|---|---|---|
| Sydney Roosters | 16 – 24 | Brisbane Broncos | 12 September 2008, 7:45 pm | Sydney Football Stadium | Tony Archer | 18,343 |
| Cronulla Sharks | 36 – 10 | Canberra Raiders | 13 September 2008, 6:30 pm | Toyota Stadium | Jared Maxwell | 18,252 |
| Manly Sea Eagles | 38 – 6 | St. George Illawarra Dragons | 13 September 2008, 8:30 pm | Brookvale Oval | Shayne Hayne | 19,227 |
| Melbourne Storm | 15 – 18 | New Zealand Warriors | 14 September 2008, 4:00 pm | Olympic Park Stadium | Jason Robinson | 15,193 |

=== Semifinals ===
- For the second year running, Manly had the week off whilst for the first time since 1999 Cronulla hosted a home preliminary final.
- Both matches this weekend were NRL grand final rematches; the New Zealand Warriors faced the Sydney Roosters whom they lost to in the 2002 decider, whilst Melbourne travelled to Brisbane to take on their 2006 Grand Final nemesis the Broncos.
- New Zealand became the first team to get to a preliminary final from 8th position, beating the Roosters 30-13.
- After trailing for all but the last 46 seconds of the match, Melbourne got out of jail in a controversial match against the Brisbane Broncos with a Greg Inglis try and subsequently ended their season, and that of the Broncos' coaching career of Wayne Bennett. They went on to play Cronulla in the preliminary final.

| Home | Score | Away | Match information |
| Home | Score | Away | Date and time | Venue | Referee | Crowd |
|---|---|---|---|---|---|---|
| New Zealand Warriors | 30 – 13 | Sydney Roosters | 19 September 2008, 6:30 pm | Mt. Smart Stadium | Tony Archer | 25,595 |
| Brisbane Broncos | 14 – 16 | Melbourne Storm | 20 September 2008, 7:45 pm | Suncorp Stadium | Shayne Hayne | 50,466 |

=== Preliminary finals ===
- The Sydney Football Stadium was allocated for both preliminary finals. Due to both sides being from the Sydney region, the home stadium could have been allocated to either the Sydney Football Stadium, or the larger ANZ Stadium. It was stated that due to both clubs ranking in the lower half of average attendances for home games in 2008.
- Melbourne, under stand-in captain Cooper Cronk, defeated the Cronulla-Sutherland Sharks 28-0, keeping them scoreless for the first time since 2003. The Storm thus made it to their third consecutive grand final, joining the South Sydney Rabbitohs, Sydney Roosters, Balmain Tigers, St. George Dragons, Western Suburbs Magpies, Parramatta Eels, Canterbury Bulldogs, Canberra Raiders and the Manly-Warringah Sea Eagles to qualify for at least three rugby league grand finals in a row.

| Home | Score | Away | Match information |
| Home | Score | Away | Date and time | Venue | Referee | Crowd |
|---|---|---|---|---|---|---|
| Cronulla Sharks | 0 – 28 | Melbourne Storm | 26 September 2008, 7:45 pm | Sydney Football Stadium | Tony Archer | 27,570 |
| Manly Sea Eagles | 32 - 6 | New Zealand Warriors | 27 September 2008, 7:45 pm | Sydney Football Stadium | Shayne Hayne | 32,095 |

=== Grand final ===
- Manly's 40 to nil victory against Melbourne win in the 2008 Grand Final was the largest on record, surpassing the Eastern Suburbs' 38-0 win over St. George in 1975.
- On the other hand, the runners-up Melbourne Storm became the first team since 1978 to be held scoreless in a grand final (when Cronulla suffered so 16-0 against Manly).

| Home | Score | Away | Clive Churchill Medallist | Match information |
| Home | Score | Away | Clive Churchill Medallist | Date and time | Venue | Referee | Crowd |
|---|---|---|---|---|---|---|---|
| Manly-Warringah Sea Eagles | 40 - 0 | Melbourne Storm | Brent Kite (Manly) | 5 October 2008, 5:00 pm | ANZ Stadium | Tony Archer | 80,388 |
