= Taniela =

Taniela is a given name of Pacific Islander origin. Notable people with the name include:

- Taniela Lasalo, Australian rugby league player
- Taniela Moa, Tongan rugby union player
- Taniela Rawaqa, Fijian rugby union player
- Taniela Tuiaki, New Zealand rugby league player
- Taniela Waqa, Fijian footballer
