= Kris Keating =

Australian rugby league footballer

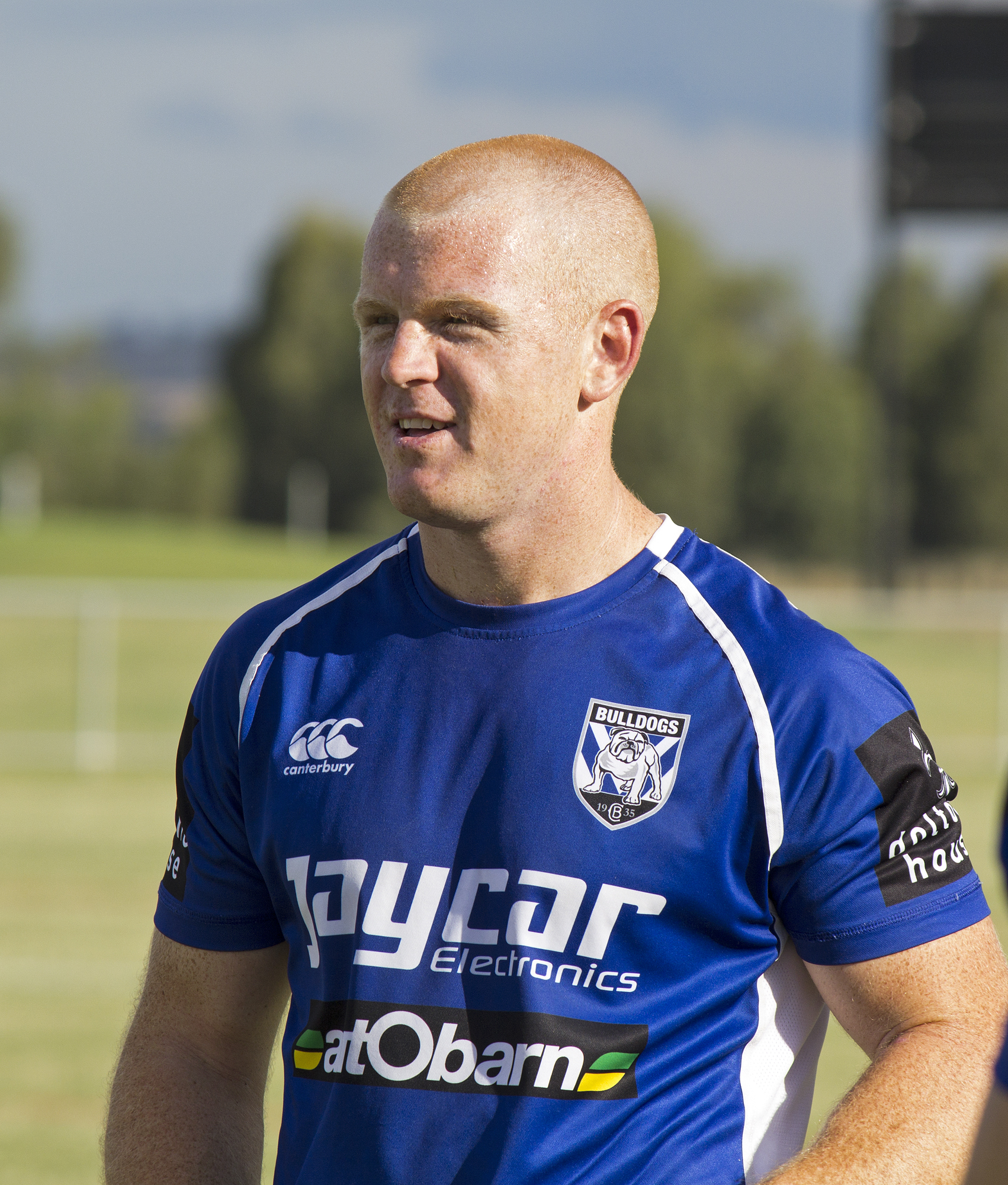
- Keating in 2012

Personal information
- Full name: Kristopher Keating
- Born: 26 November 1988 (age 37) Sydney, Australia
- Height: 177 cm (5 ft 10 in)
- Weight: 86 kg (13 st 8 lb)

Playing information
- Position: Halfback, Five-eighth, Hooker
Club
Years	Team	Pld	T	G	FG	P
2008–10	Parramatta Eels	41	4	3	0	22
2011–13	Canterbury Bulldogs	47	7	0	0	28
2014	Hull Kingston Rovers	24	5	0	0	20
	Total	112	16	3	0	70
Representative
Years	Team	Pld	T	G	FG	P
2007	NSW Residents	1	1	0	0	4
2010–12	City Origin	2	1	0	0	4
- Source: As of 9 January 2024
- Relatives: Matt Keating (brother)

Kristopher Keating (born 26 November 1988), is an Australian former professional rugby league footballer. He played as a halfback, five-eighth or hooker.

== Background ==
Keating was born in Sydney, New South Wales, Australia. He is the younger brother of Burleigh Bears player Matt Keating.

Keating attended Westfields Sports High School, and in 2005 played for the Australian Schoolboys team.

== Career ==
After the sudden departure of Brett Finch in early April 2009, Keating was rushed into the starting side for the Parramatta Eels, playing the role of stand-off. Due to his small stature and quick acceleration, opposition defenders had trouble tackling him, and he successfully broke the defensive line on numerous occasions during his first-grade NRL career. He broke his jaw in Round 10 in 2009 against the Manly-Warringah Sea Eagles and couldn't make a comeback in the same season.

In 2010 he was named on the bench and came on for some short stints at hooker. After a poor display from Parramatta Eels’ early rounds, some changes were made and Kris Keating was named in the starting squad playing in the stand-off position. In succession to his form he was called up to the representative grades, playing stand-off for his City of Origin.

In June 2010, Keating signed with the Canterbury-Bankstown Bulldogs starting from 2011. Keating played in the 2012 NRL grand final for Canterbury against Melbourne which Melbourne won 14-4.

After the departure of talismanic scrum-half captain Michael Dobson (rugby league) from Hull Kingston Rovers at the end of the 2013 Super League season. Kris Keating was signed by Hull Kingston Rovers for the 2014, 2015 and 2016 seasons.

Keating only missed four games in the 2014 season, he missed two successive games because of injury, against Hull F.C. on Good Friday and a fixture against the Catalans Dragons on Easter Monday respectively. Keating was also dropped from the Hull Kingston Rovers squad because of poor form, for the trip to the capital to visit the London Broncos. He also missed Hull Kingston Rovers’ final game of the 2014 Super League season, against the Wakefield Trinity Wildcats.

Kris scored 5 tries in 24 appearances in 2014, his début and last season in the Super League.

On 8 November 2014, Keating signed a 1-year contract with the St. George Illawarra Dragons starting in 2015.

On 30 April 2015, Keating was granted a release from his St. George Illawarra Dragons contract to take up opportunities elsewhere at Sydney Survivors.
