= Tony Nash (rugby league) =

Australian rugby league footballer

Personal information
- Full name: Anthony John Nash
- Born: 30 September 1921 Sydney, New South Wales, Australia
- Died: 5 April 1969 (aged 47)

Playing information
- Position: Lock
Club
Years	Team	Pld	T	G	FG	P
1942	Canterbury Bankstown	7	7	0	0	21

Tony Nash (1921–1969) was an Australian professional rugby league player for Canterbury Bankstown in the New South Wales Rugby League premiership. Nash made his first grade debut on 23 May 1942 for Canterbury scoring four tries against South Sydney. Nash played the game as a late replacement for Edgar Newman who had to withdraw due to illness. This equaled Johnno Stuntz's record in the number of tries in an Australian rugby league player's first grade debut, which was only to be equalled again after Nash, 66 years later by Jordan Atkins.
