= Ben Smith (rugby league) =

Australian rugby league footballer

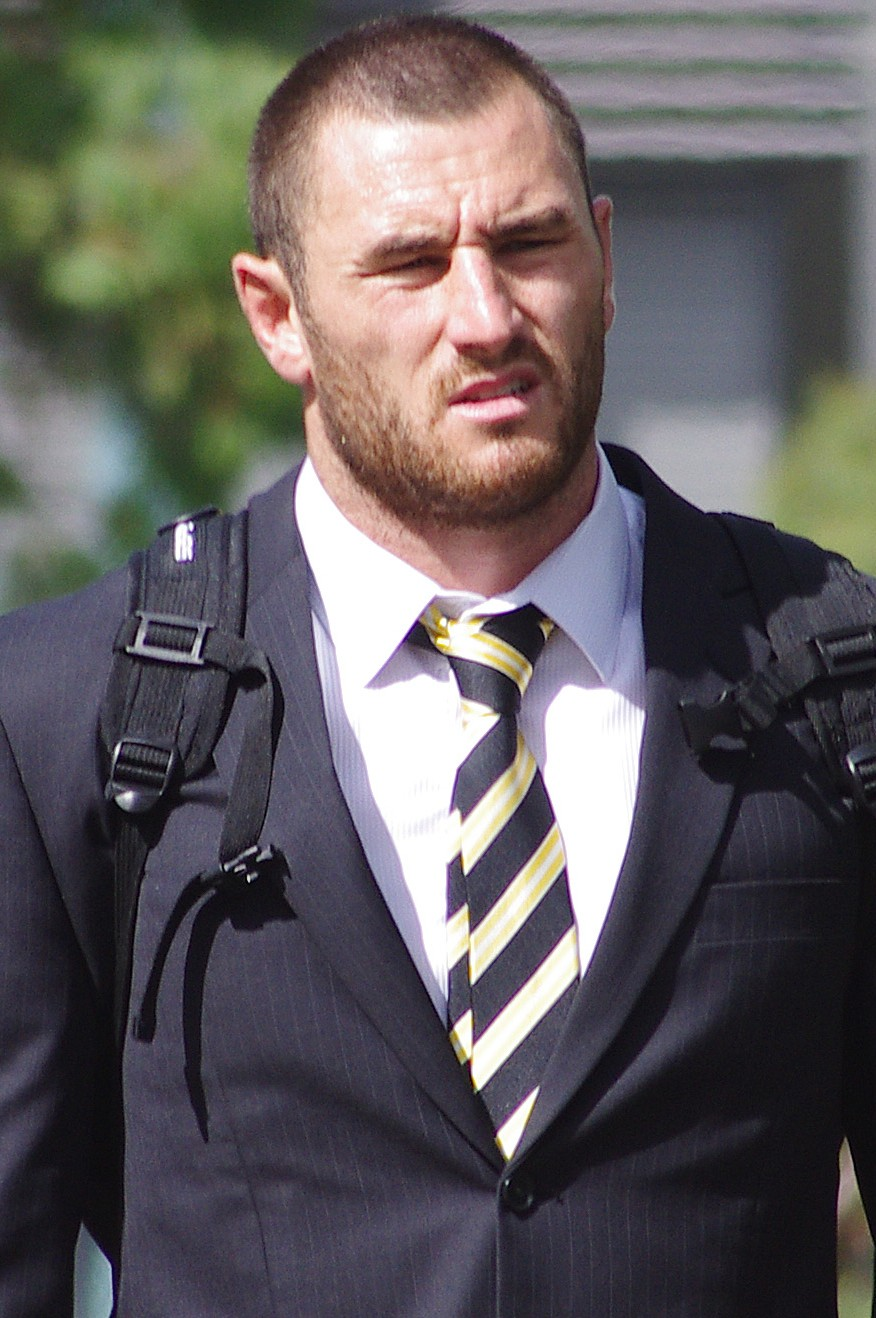

Personal information
- Full name: Benjamin William Smith
- Born: 16 October 1984 (age 42) Quirindi, New South Wales, Australia
- Height: 192 cm (6 ft 4 in)
- Weight: 101 kg (15 st 13 lb)

Playing information
- Position: Centre, Second-row, Lock
Club
Years	Team	Pld	T	G	FG	P
2004–14	Parramatta Eels	152	37	0	0	148

Benjamin William Smith (born 16 October 1984) is an Australian former professional rugby league footballer who played as a centre, second-row and lock for the Parramatta Eels in the NRL.

== Early life ==
Smith was born in Quirindi, New South Wales, playing for his junior club, the Werris Creek Magpies.

== Rugby league career ==
Smith made his first grade debut in round 20 of the 2004 NRL season for Parramatta against Melbourne Storm in a 22–16 loss at Olympic Park in Melbourne.

He established himself in the NRL in 2005, when he had a boom rookie season alongside club namesake, Tim Smith. The monster centre of 102 kg, easily big enough to play in the forwards, damaged opposition teams out wide with his size and strength, he played 18 games and scored 14 tries in an outstanding rookie year. Smith was a part of the 2005 Minor Premiership winning side which made it to the preliminary final before suffering a shock loss going down to North Queensland 29–0.

The 2006 NRL season loomed as a learning curve season for Smith as after initially showing all the promise he had from the previous season, he sustained a serious leg injury against the North Queensland Cowboys in round 4, and was sidelined for half the NRL season. He only managed 14 games for three tries, however, it provided the platform for him to return to his best in 2007.

Plagued by injuries, Smith's young career has been shortened by extended periods when he was not fit to play. Throughout the 2007 and 2008 seasons, he was in and out of the Parramatta backline. In the 2009 NRL season, Smith began playing in the forward pack. The decision by Eels coach Daniel Anderson was not surprising, given Smith's 16 stone physique. Smith played for Parramatta in the 2009 NRL Grand Final 23–16 defeat against Melbourne. Melbourne were later stripped of the premiership for major and deliberate breaches of the salary cap.

In the 2010 NRL season, Smith played 19 games as Parramatta failed to build upon their grand final appearance in 2009, missing the finals series by finishing 12th. The following year in 2011, Smith played nearly every game for the club as they narrowly avoided the wooden spoon. Parramatta defeated the Gold Coast in the final game of the year to avoid finishing last.

On 13 May 2012, Smith re-signed with the Eels until the end of the 2014 NRL season. Parramatta would finish last on the table in 2012 for the first time since 1972. In June 2013, Smith was one of 12 Parramatta players that were told that their futures at the club were uncertain by coach, Ricky Stuart. Parramatta would finish the 2013 NRL season with the Wooden Spoon for a second consecutive year.

Smith retired at the end of the 2014 NRL season, finishing his career a one club player with 152 games for the Parramatta Eels.

== Statistics ==
Year	Team	Games	Tries	Pts
2004	Parramatta Eels	3		
2005	Parramatta Eels	18	14	56
2006	Parramatta Eels	14	3	12
2007	Parramatta Eels	23	8	32
2008	Parramatta Eels	2		
2009	Parramatta Eels	23	1	4
2010	Parramatta Eels	19	3	12
2011	Parramatta Eels	24	7	28
2012	Parramatta Eels	8	1	4
2013	Parramatta Eels	8		
2014	Parramatta Eels	10		
	Totals	152	37	148
