= Matt Keating (rugby league) =

Australian footballer (born 1986)

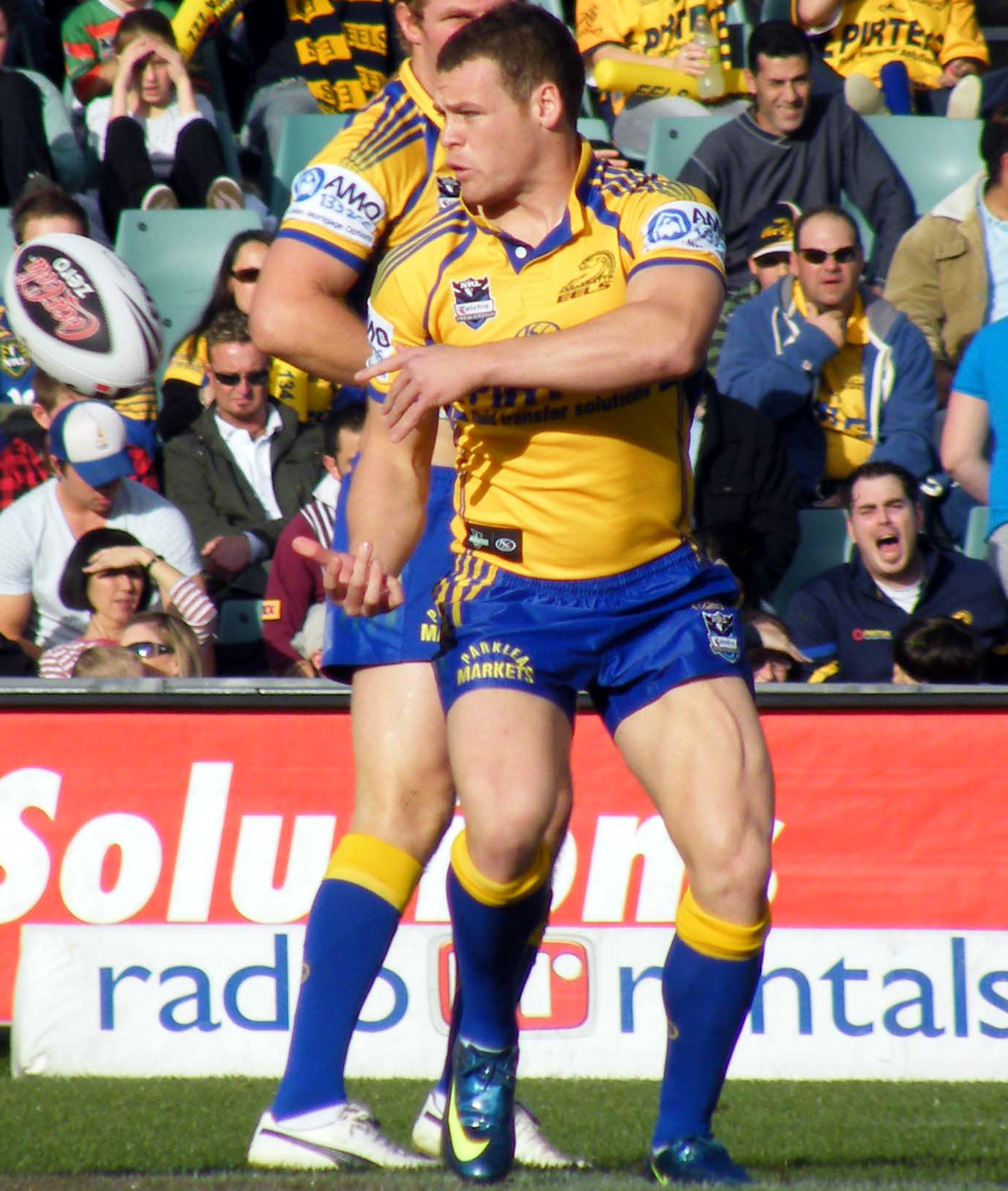

Personal information
- Full name: Matthew Keating
- Born: 6 September 1986 (age 40) Sydney, New South Wales, Australia

Playing information
- Height: 1.78 m (5 ft 10 in)
- Weight: 87 kg (13 st 10 lb)
- Position: Hooker
Club
Years	Team	Pld	T	G	FG	P
2008–13	Parramatta Eels	130	9	0	0	36
- Relatives: Kris Keating (brother)

Matt Keating (born 6 September 1986) is an Australian former professional rugby league footballer who played as a hooker. He played 130 games for the Parramatta Eels in the NRL between 2008 and 2013.

== Background ==
He is the older brother of the rugby league player; Kris Keating.

== Rugby league career ==
=== Parramatta Eels (2008–2013) ===
Keating made his first grade debut for the Parramatta Eels in round 1 of the 2008 NRL season against the Canterbury-Bankstown Bulldogs. Keating took on the role of starting hooker as the replacement for Mark Riddell, who left the team to play in the Super League. He played in every game for Parramatta since making his debut in round 1 of 2008 to the 2009 NRL Grand Final (52 Consecutive first grade games).

In June 2013, Keating was one of 12 Parramatta Eels players that were told that their futures at the club were uncertain by coach, Ricky Stuart. Keating played 24 games for Parramatta in the 2013 NRL season as the team finished last for a second consecutive year. He was then subsequently released by the club.

=== Burleigh Bears (2014) ===
In October 2013, Keating signed with the Burleigh Bears for the 2014 Intrust Super Cup season. Keating retired at the end of the 2014 season and became a full-time Junior Development Officer with the Bears.
