= Chris Hicks (rugby league) =

Australian rugby league footballer

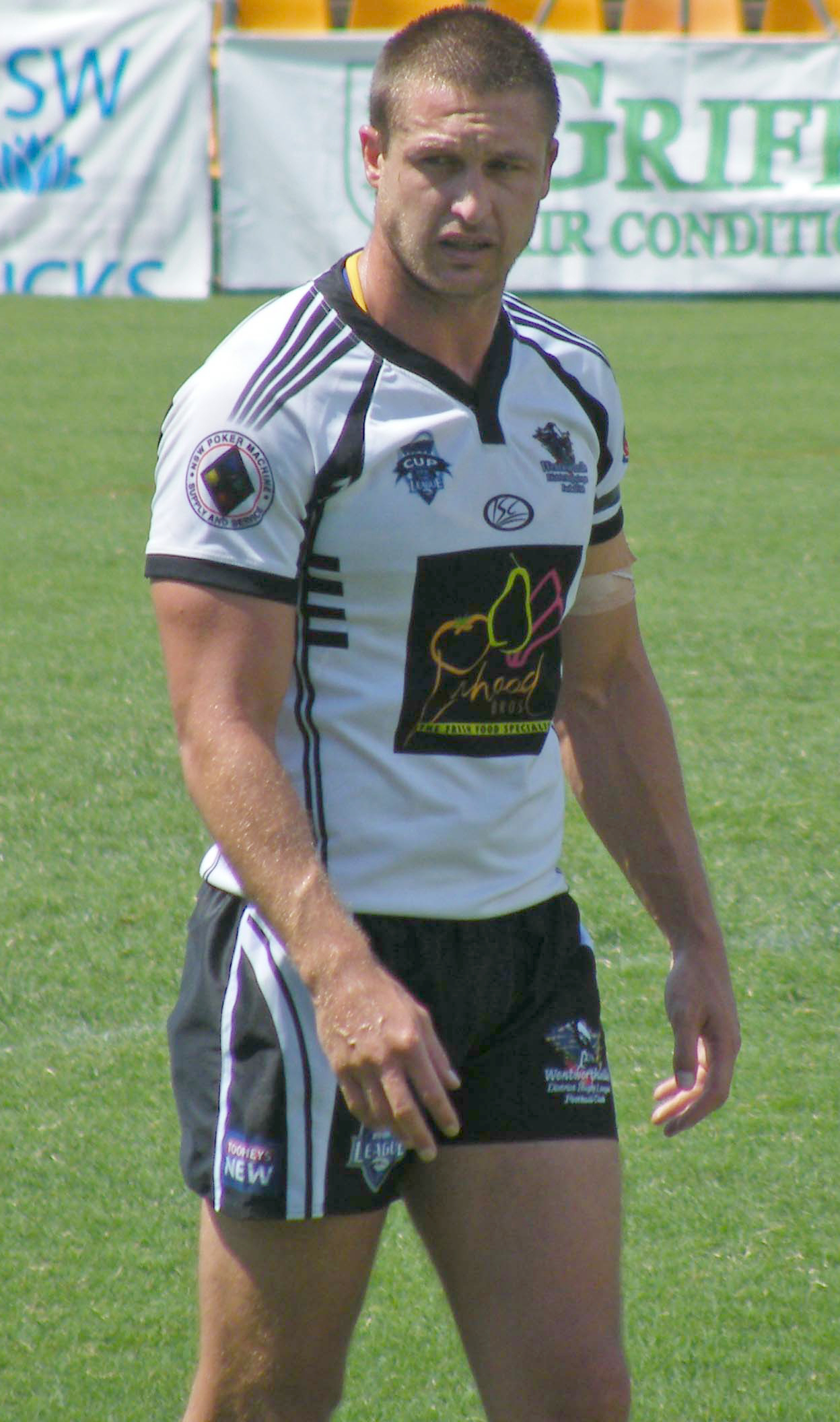

Personal information
- Born: 19 March 1977 (age 48); Sydney, New South Wales, Australia
- Height: 1.85 m (6 ft 1 in)
- Weight: 91 kg (14 st 5 lb)

Playing information
- Position: Wing, Fullback, Centre
Club
Years	Team	Pld	T	G	FG	P
1997–02	Penrith Panthers	101	36	77	0	298
2004–07	Manly Sea Eagles	93	42	7	0	182
2008–10	Warrington Wolves	82	71	119	0	572
2011	Parramatta Eels	7	3	0	0	12
	Total	283	152	203	0	1064
Representative
Years	Team	Pld	T	G	FG	P
2001–06	NSW Country	2	1	5	0	14
- Source: As of 26 June 2009

Chris Hicks (born 19 March 1977) is an Australian former professional rugby league footballer who played in the 1990s, 2000s and 2010s. He last played for the Parramatta Eels of the National Rugby League (NRL). A former New South Wales country origin representative fullback or wing, he has previously played in the NRL for the Penrith Panthers and Manly-Warringah Sea Eagles as well as playing for Warrington Wolves of the Super League.

== Playing career ==
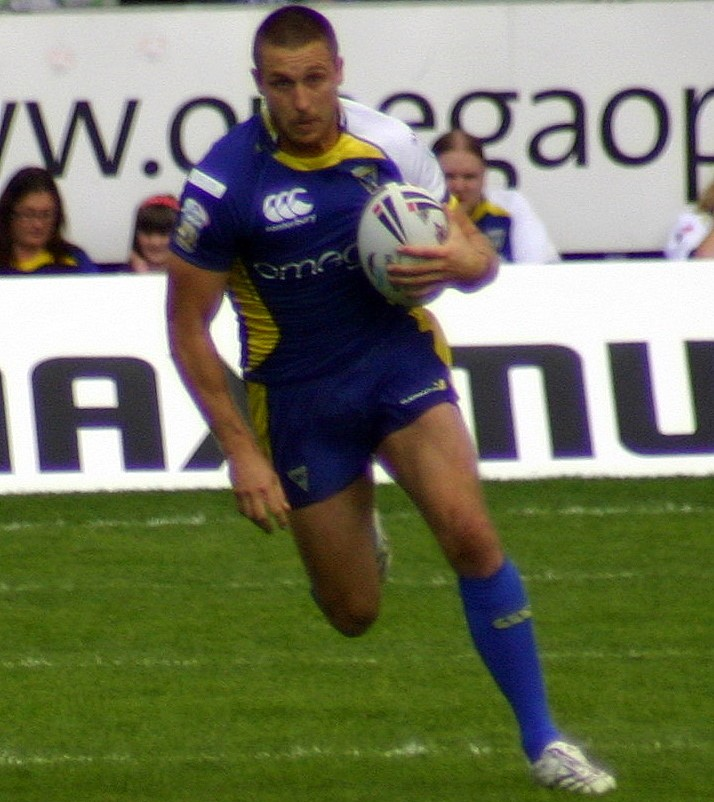
Hicks playing for Warrington in 2008

=== Early NRL career ===
Hicks made his NRL début for the Penrith Panthers in 1997. In six years with the Penrith club, Hicks scored just under 300 points. In 2004, Hicks made his return to the NRL, this time for the Manly-Warringah Sea Eagles. Hicks spent four years with the Manly outfit and played in their 2007 NRL grand final defeat to the Melbourne Storm.

=== Super League ===
Hicks signed for the Warrington Wolves in the Super League for the 2008 season. At 30 years old he joined Manly team-mate Michael Monaghan in moving to the Wolves for the 2008 season.

In his first season with Warrington, he scored in every single game after adopting kicking duties for the club. The first time he failed to score in a Warrington game came in a 60–8 defeat away at Harlequins on Saturday 24 March 2009, five games into his second season with the Warrington side. In each of his three years at Warrington, Hicks was the team's top try-scorer. While he was with Warrington, the team won two Challenge Cups. Hicks scored a hat-trick in the 2010 Challenge Cup Final victory over Leeds at Wembley Stadium.

=== Retirement and return to NRL ===
On 3 December 2010, it was announced that Hicks had retired with immediate effect to make room for Warrington's new signing, Joel Monaghan. However, the retirement was very short-lived. Within a fortnight, Hicks signed a one-year deal with the Parramatta Eels to help fill the gap left by the retiring Eric Grothe Jr. Hicks retired at the end the 2011 NRL season. In round 26 against the Sydney Roosters, Hicks scored a try in his 200th Game.
