= Jacob Loko =

Australian rugby league footballer

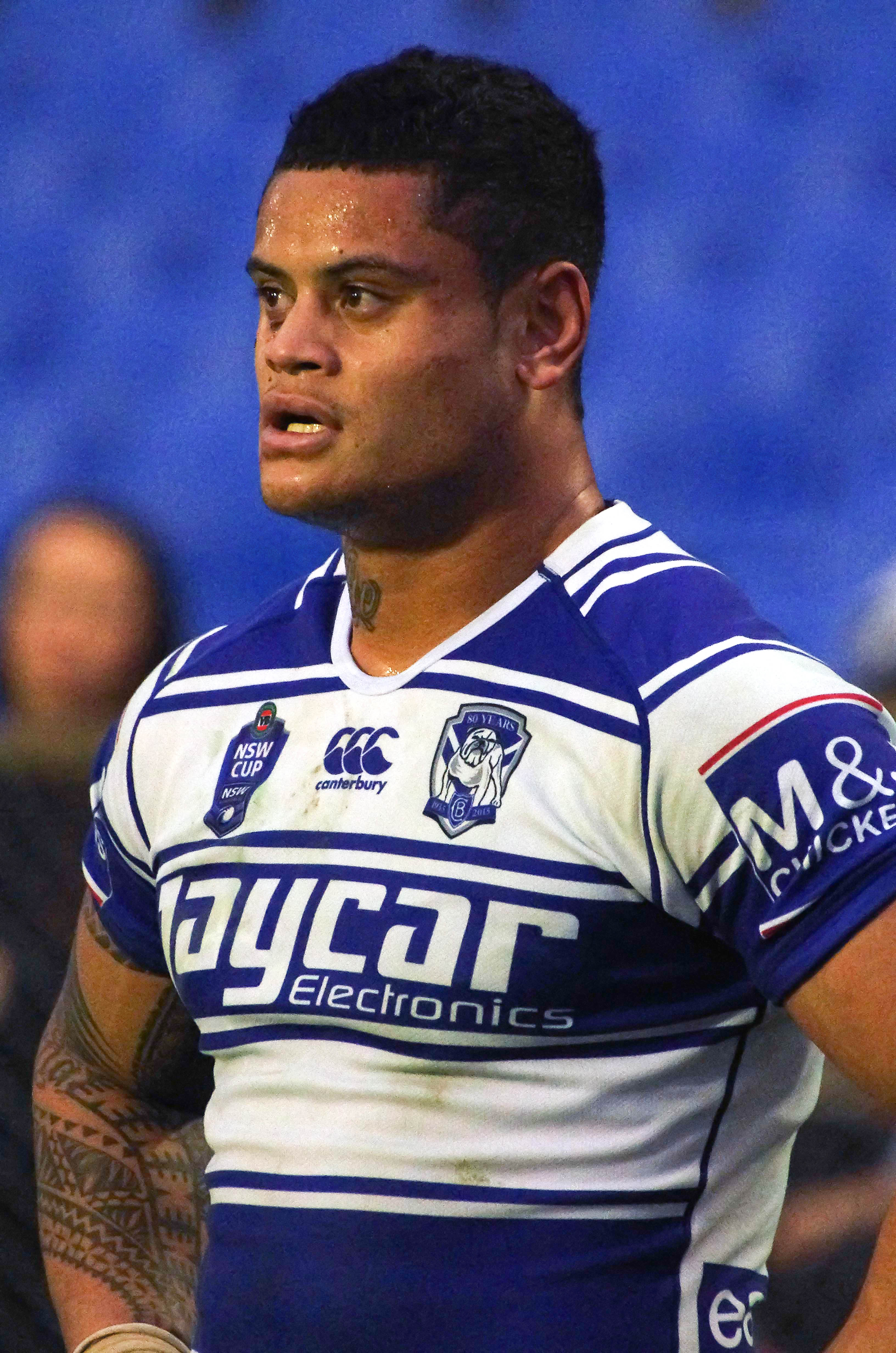
- Loko in 2015

Personal information
- Born: 12 August 1992 (age 34) Sydney, Australia
- Height: 192 cm (6 ft 4 in)
- Weight: 107 kg (16 st 12 lb)

Playing information
- Position: Second-row, Centre
Club
Years	Team	Pld	T	G	FG	P
2011–14	Parramatta Eels	23	4	0	0	16
- Source: As of 24 September 2015

Jacob Loko (born 12 August 1992) is an Australian rugby league footballer who most recently played for the Blacktown Workers Sea Eagles in the Intrust Super Premiership NSW.

== Early life ==
Loko is of Fijian and Tongan descent. Loko was raised in Claymore, New South Wales, a small suburb in Campbelltown.

== Rugby league career ==
Loko began playing junior rugby league for Campbelltown City Kangaroos and Eagle Vale, while also attending Eaglevale High School. Loko then moved to Westfields Sports High School playing junior league with the Cabramatta Two Blues and Allsaints Toongabbie, before completing his senior year at The Hills Sports High School. He was part of the team that won the ARL Schoolboy Cup and also played for the New South Wales under 18's team at the state championships.

=== 2010–14: Parramatta ===
During Loko's senior year in high school, Loko performed strongly on the Parramatta Eels S. G. Ball Cup squad, which earned him a place in the National Youth Competition team. Loko played 16 games for the Parramatta Eels' National Youth Competition team over the 2010 and 2011 seasons, in which he has scored 7 tries including a hat-trick against the South Sydney Rabbitohs. Loko made his debut for the Parramatta Eels in round five of the 2011 NRL season, playing against the Melbourne Storm in a 38–0 defeat. He suffered a torn anterior cruciate ligament (ACL) in the Round 17 game against the Brisbane Broncos. He was ruled out of the remainder of the 2011 NRL season.

In the 2012 preseason, Loko sustained another knee injury whilst boxing. He was once again ruled out for the season. Loko returned to first grade in the 2013 NRL season and made his return in round 1 against the New Zealand Warriors, where Parramatta won 40–10. Loko made a total of 13 appearances for Parramatta in the 2013 NRL season as the club finished last on the table and claimed the wooden spoon.

=== 2014–2015: Canterbury-Bankstown ===
Canterbury-Bankstown signed Loko in 2014. Terry Lamb said that Loko has the same physical traits and dimensions as a young Sonny Bill Williams.

On 2 January 2015, Loko was arrested and charged for high-range drink driving, with a blood alcohol level almost four times above the legal limit.

In October 2015, Loko was caught with five capsules filled with ecstasy on his person at The Star casino. He was sacked by Canterbury as a result and didn't manage to make a single first grade appearance for the club.

=== Later years ===
In 2016, Loko played for the Thirlmere Roosters in the Group 6 Rugby League competition. At the end of 2017, Loko signed a contract with the Blacktown Workers Sea Eagles for the 2018 Intrust Super Premiership NSW season.

On 24 July 2018, a Sydney Morning Herald report revealed that Loko had quit playing for Blacktown Workers to play local park football and start an apprenticeship.

In 2021, Loko returned to the Thirlmere Roosters, resuming his role in the backrow.
