= Shane Shackleton =

Australian rugby league footballer

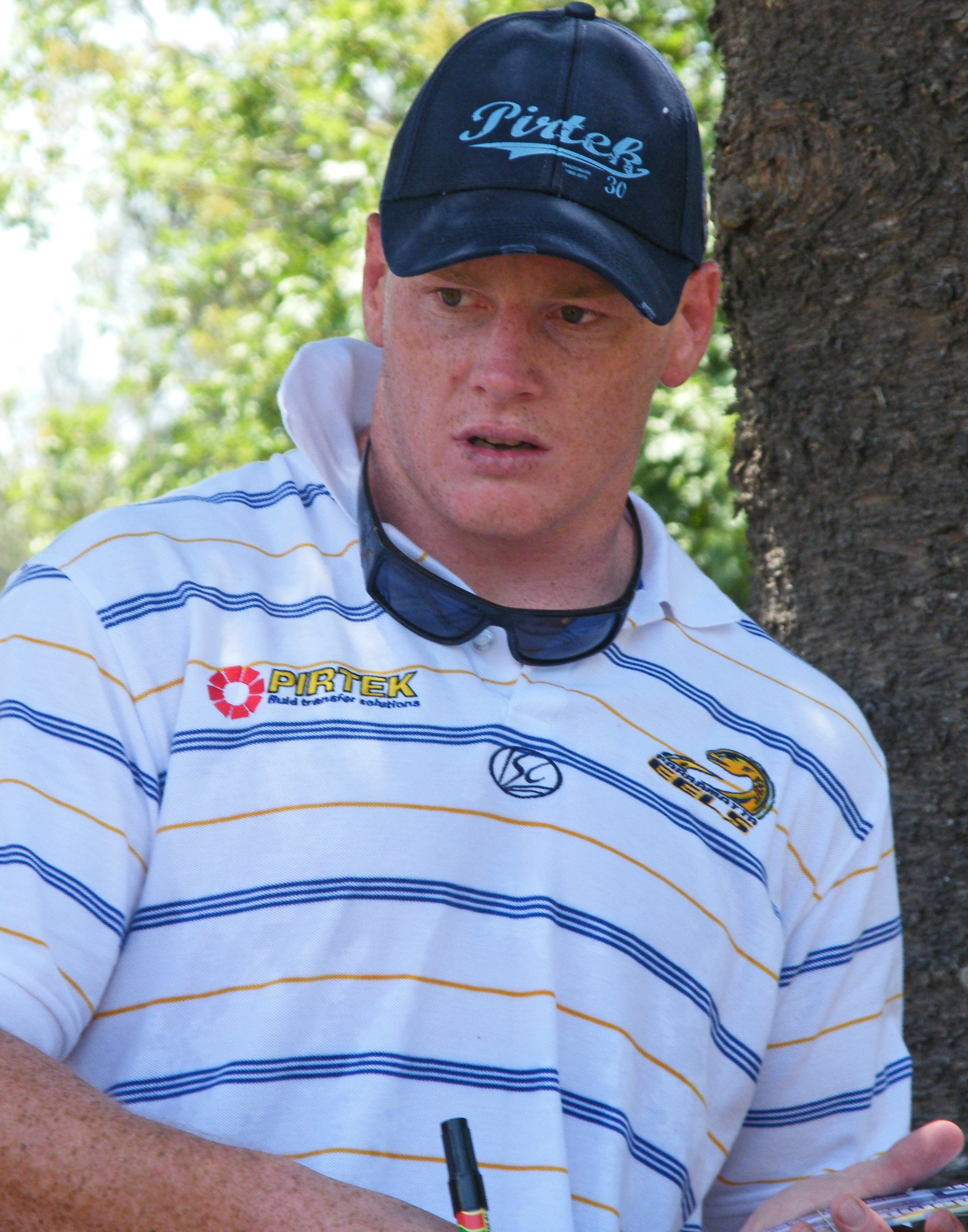

Personal information
- Full name: Shane Shackleton
- Born: 8 July 1982 (age 44) Sydney, New South Wales, Australia

Playing information
- Height: 1.88 m (6 ft 2 in)
- Weight: 102 kg (16 st 1 lb)
- Position: Prop, Second-row, Lock
Club
Years	Team	Pld	T	G	FG	P
2005–09	Sydney Roosters	65	3	0	0	12
2010–11	Parramatta Eels	24	1	0	0	4
2012	Penrith Panthers	4	0	0	0	0
	Total	93	4	0	0	16
Representative
Years	Team	Pld	T	G	FG	P
2009–11	NSW City	2	0	0	0	0

Shane Shackleton is an Australian former professional rugby league footballer who played as a prop and second-row forward who played for the Sydney Roosters, Parramatta Eels and the Penrith Panthers in the NRL. He played twice for NSW City between 2009 and 2011.

== Playing career ==
Shackleton made his first grade debut for the Sydney Roosters in 2005. Shackleton's last season at the club ended with a wooden spoon in 2009. In total, Shackleton made 65 appearances for the club. Shackleton was selected for City in the City vs Country match on 8 May 2009. Shackleton was also eligible to play for Malta in the same year.

Shackleton signed for the Parramatta Eels for a reported three-year deal starting from 2010. He made his debut for the Parramatta Eels coming off the bench in round 1 up against St. George Illawarra, but only to suffer a horrific hamstring injury immediately ending his season.

After suffering one of the worst hamstring injuries seen by doctors, Shackleton had worked hard to get back into the side and was a regular off the bench for Parramatta. In early 2011 when Parramatta played the Gold Coast, Shackleton scored a try after pouncing on a bomb which was the match winner for Parramatta.

In 2012, Shackleton was dropped to the Wentworthville Magpies, the Eels NRL feeder team. When asked on Facebook why he was not playing first grade, he replies, because, "Kearney's a fucker."

Soon after, Shackleton signed a two-year deal to link up with the Penrith Panthers prior to the 30 June trade deadline, resulting in an immediate switch to the new club. In 2013, Shackleton was working part time as a labourer and also a comedian while playing for the Mount Pritchard Mounties in the Intrust Super Premiership NSW competition. In 2016, Shackleton while playing for the Guildford Owls, was named in the Ron Massey Cup representative side to play the Queensland Rangers.

In November 2018, Shackleton played for Parramatta in the Legends of League tournament which was staged at the Central Coast Stadium in Gosford.

== Career highlights ==
First grade debut: Sydney Roosters v Brisbane, Suncorp Stadium, 26 August 2005 (Rd 25)
