= Jordan Atkins =

Australian rugby league footballer (born 1983)

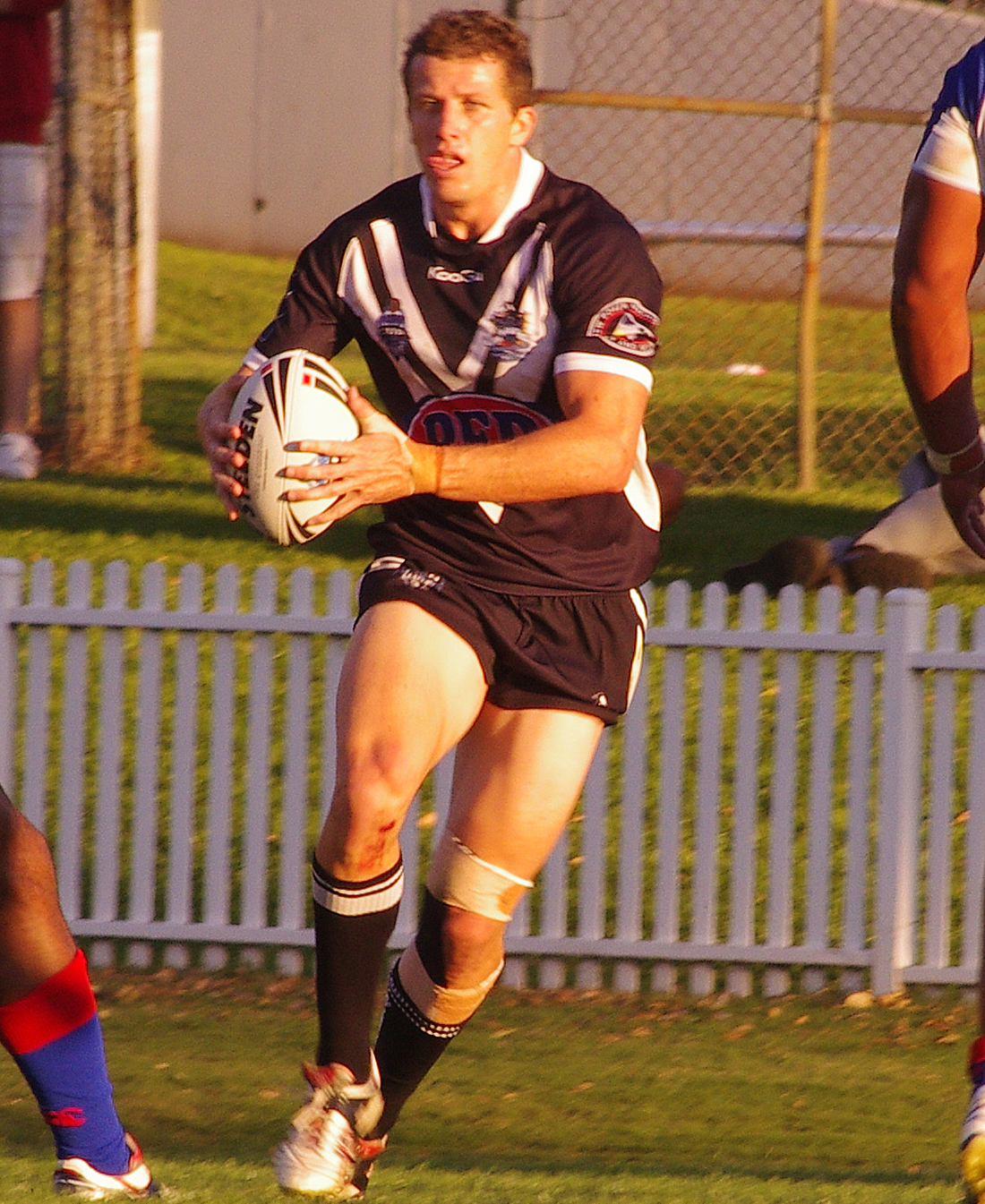

Personal information
- Born: 22 January 1983 (age 43) Stanthorpe, Queensland, Australia

Playing information
- Height: 188 cm (6 ft 2 in)
- Weight: 96 kg (15 st 2 lb)
- Position: Wing, Fullback
Club
| Years | Team | Pld | T | G | FG | P |
|---|---|---|---|---|---|---|
| 2008–10 | Gold Coast Titans | 28 | 8 | 0 | 0 | 32 |
| 2011–12 | Parramatta Eels | 12 | 3 | 0 | 0 | 12 |
| 2013 | Gold Coast Titans | 2 | 0 | 0 | 0 | 0 |
| 2014 | London Broncos | 14 | 4 | 0 | 0 | 16 |
| | Total | 56 | 15 | 0 | 0 | 60 |
Representative
| Years | Team | Pld | T | G | FG | P |
| 2006–07 | Queensland Residents | 2 | 1 | 0 | 0 | 4 |

Jordan Atkins (born 22 January 1983) is an Australian former professional rugby league footballer who last played for the London Broncos in the Super League. His positions of choice are at wing or centre.

== Early life ==
Atkins was born in Stanthorpe, Queensland, Australia.

== Early playing career ==
In 2004, Atkins travelled to the United Kingdom as a member of the Australian Universities rugby league team.

He spent the 2006 and 2007 seasons playing with the Burleigh Bears in the Queensland Cup while studying for his teaching degree at the University of Southern Queensland.

== Playing career ==
=== 2008-10: Career with Gold Coast ===
Atkins made his first-grade début against the North Queensland Cowboys in round one of the National Rugby League (NRL) 2008 season. Atkin's tally of four tries in that match equalled the standing record for most tries in an Australian first grade début set by Johnno Stuntz for Eastern Suburbs début 1908 season, which was the first match of the opening game of rugby league in Australia, and later Canterbury Bankstown's Tony Nash in the 1942 season.

=== 2011-12: Career with Parramatta ===
In September 2010, Atkins signed a two-year contract with the Parramatta Eels for the 2011 and 2012 seasons. Atkins played 12 games for Parramatta in the 2011 NRL season as the club narrowly avoided the wooden spoon. Parramatta managed to avoid the dreaded award by beating Atkins former club the Gold Coast in the final round of the year.

=== London Broncos ===
In February 2014, Atkins signed a one-year deal to play with London Broncos in England. Atkins retired at the end of the season.
