= Taniela Lasalo =

Australian rugby league footballer

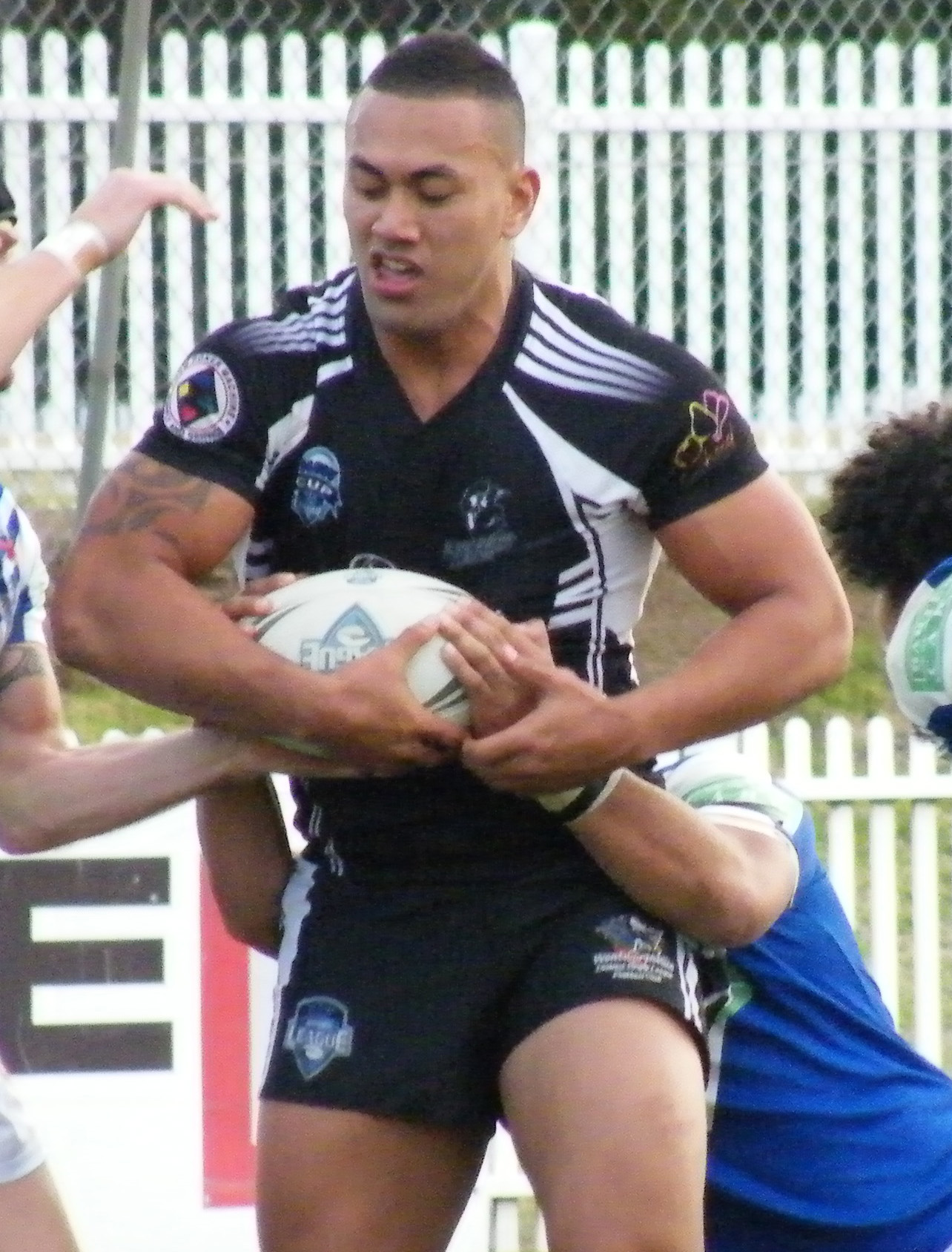

Personal information
- Full name: Taniela Lasalo
- Born: 23 September 1989 (age 37) Westmead, New South Wales, Australia
- Height: 1.86 m (6 ft 1 in)
- Weight: 110 kg (17 st 5 lb)

Playing information
- Position: Second-row
Club
Years	Team	Pld	T	G	FG	P
2009–14	Parramatta Eels	40	3	0	0	12
- Source: As of 12 May 2019

Taniela Lasalo is an Australian professional rugby league footballer who plays as a lock, second-row forward or as a centre for the Hills District Bulls in the Ron Massey Cup.

== Background ==
He is of Tongan descent.

== Playing career ==
=== 2009–14: Career at Parramatta ===
Lasalo was named the Eels Toyota Cup captain for the 2009 season. He also made his National Rugby League (NRL) debut against the Cronulla-Sutherland Sharks in round 11 2009. In the 2010 NRL season, Lasalo made 2 appearances for Parramatta.

Lasalo played every game in the 2011 NRL season for the Eels as the club narrowly avoided the wooden spoon, as well as re-signing with Parramatta until 2013.

Lasalo made 12 appearances for Parramatta in the 2012 NRL season as the club finished last for the first time since 1972.

In the 2013 pre-season, Lasalo injured his arm and was ruled out indefinitely for the 2013 NRL season. Due to his injury, Lasalo missed the entire season. In round 8, 2014 he made his NRL return on the bench for Parramatta against North Queensland.

On 24 September 2017, Lasalo scored a try in Wentworthville's 38–4 victory over Auburn Warriors in the 2017 Ron Massey Cup grand final. In 2018, Lasalo joined the Guildford Owls.

In 2021, he joined Hills District in the Ron Massey Cup. Lasalo scored a try for Hill District in their 2022 Ron Massey Cup grand final victory over Glebe.

== Representative career ==
Lasalo was named in the Tongan squad for the 2008 Rugby League World Cup.
