= Johnno Stuntz =

Australia international rugby league footballer and soldier

- Stuntz in 1907

Personal information
- Full name: John Stuntz
- Born: 27 June 1884 Sydney, New South Wales, Australia
- Died: 3 May 1917 (aged 32) Bullecourt, France

Playing information
- Position: Wing
Club
Years	Team	Pld	T	G	FG	P
1908–09	Eastern Suburbs	6	7	0	0	21
1909–10	Warrington	19	13	0	0	39
1911	Western Suburbs	6	1	0	0	3
1913	South Sydney	4	1	0	0	3
	Total	35	22	0	0	66
Representative
Years	Team	Pld	T	G	FG	P
1909	Australia	1	1	0	0	3
1911	New South Wales	5	4	0	0	12
1908–11	Metropolis	2	0	0	0	0
- Source: As of 19 June 2019
- Military career
- Allegiance: Australia
- Branch: Australian Army
- Service years: 1916-1917
- Unit: 17th Battalion
- Conflicts: World War I; Second Bullecourt

John "Johnno" Stuntz (1884–1917) was an Australian pioneer rugby league footballer and soldier who served in World War I and died on the Western Front. A national and state representative winger, his club career was played with Eastern Suburbs, Western Suburbs and South Sydney in Australia, as well as one season with English club, Warrington. He played for New South Wales in the very first rugby match run by the newly created 'New South Wales Rugby Football League' which had just split away from the established New South Wales Rugby Football Union.

== Rugby league career ==
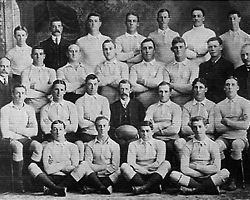
Stuntz (2nd row left) with NSW '07 Pioneers

One of Australian rugby league's founding players, Stuntz was a member of the 1907 rebel side ("the 1907 Pioneers") that played against the New Zealand 'All Golds' in the series that helped to establish rugby league football in Australia. A fireman by profession, he played 14 matches (all grades) with Easts in the years (1908–10). In Easts' first match – the opening game of club rugby league in Australia, he scored four tries. This tally remains, equally with Jordan Atkins and Charlie Staines, the most tries scored on début in Australian premiership history. In the following season Stuntz was selected to represent Australia against a touring New Zealand Maori side. In 2004 the Australian Rugby League granted Stuntz and his teammates retrospective representative status for the international games played against the Maori.

During the Australian off-season at end of 1909, Stuntz signed with the Warrington Wolves club for 125 pounds and a further 3 pounds 5 shillings a week for the 1909-10 English season,. Stuntz returned to Australia and played for both the South Sydney (1911) and Western Suburbs (1913) clubs. While playing for South Sydney in 1911 Stuntz represented for New South Wales. Stuntz was awarded Life Membership of the New South Wales Rugby League in 1914.

== War service ==
Stuntz enlisted in the first AIF in 1916. He embarked from Sydney on board HMAT A18 Wiltshire in August 1916 as a Private in the 14th reinforcement raised for the 17th Battalion of the 5th Brigade (New South Wales).

In 1917, the 17th Battalion was involved in the attack on German forces after their retreat to the Hindenburg Line. Stuntz was killed by machine-gun fire on 3 May 1917 being the first day of battle of Second Bullecourt. He has no known grave but is commemorated at the Commonwealth Memorial in Villers-Bretonneux.

Roll of Honour, AWM at Villers-Bret

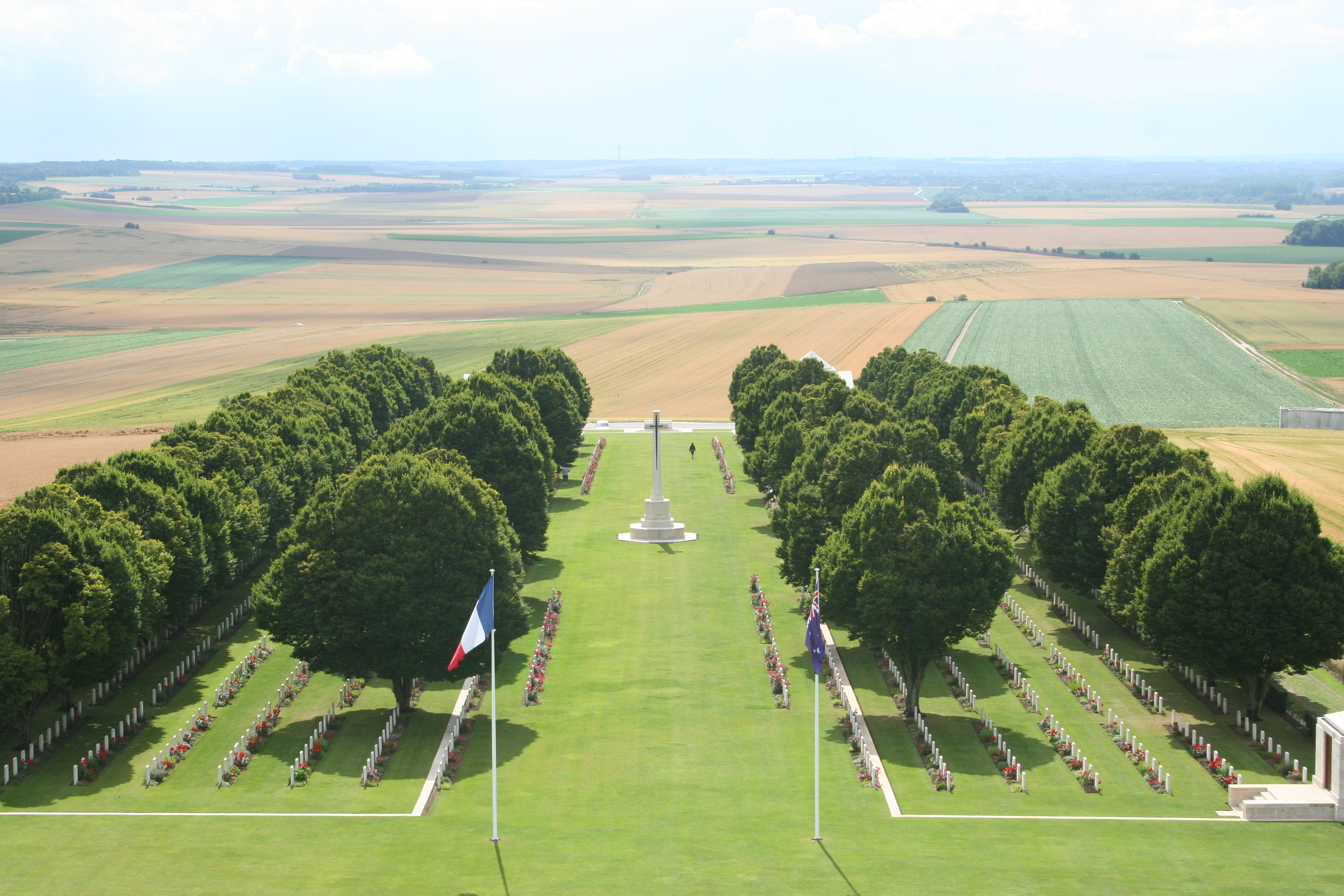
Memorial in Villers-Bretonneux where Stuntz and 770 other Australian fallen are honoured

== Bibliography ==
- Whiticker, Alan & Hudson, Glen (2006) The Encyclopedia of Rugby League Players, Gavin Allen Publishing, Sydney
- Lester, Gary The Story of Australian Rugby League
- Mideleton, David (2005) Big League Annual 2005
- Warrington Wolves website

== Online sources ==
- John Stuntz at the AIF Project
- Statistics at wolvesplayers.thisiswarrington.co.uk
