= 2008 Manly Warringah Sea Eagles season =

- NRL champions
- NRL rank: 2nd
- 2008 record: Wins: 20; losses: 7
- Points scored: For: 755; against: 367

Team information
- Coach: (Australia) Des Hasler
- Captains: (Australia) Matt Orford; (Australia) Jamie Lyon (vice-captain)
- Stadium: Brookvale Oval

Top scorers
- Tries: (Australia) Brett Stewart (22)
- Goals: (Australia) Matt Orford (78)
- Points: (Australia) Matt Orford (169)
← 2007	2009 →

The 2008 Manly Warringah Sea Eagles season was the 62nd in the club's history. Coached by Des Hasler and captained by Matt Orford, they competed in the National Rugby League's 2008 Telstra Premiership.

== Season summary ==
With the departure of hooker Michael Monaghan, many questioned whether the Manly Warringah Sea Eagles could be as competitive as in 2007 and losses in the first 2 rounds seemed to confirm this. Manly Warringah's first win came in round 3 at Brookvale with a 52–6 thrashing of the New Zealand Warriors and followed this up with a 20–2 shutout of South Sydney. In the round 5 grand final rematch against the Storm, Manly were soundly beaten 26–4 and doubt about their premiership credentials resurfaced. In Heritage Round (Rd 6) Manly Warringah had a season defining last gasp win over bitter rivals Parramatta, with Manly overcoming injuries before and during the game including one to winger Michael Bani who had to be stretchered off the ground after being knocked out.

Manly Warringah seemed to use this game as a springboard and entered a dangerous run of form, notching up numerous impressive wins over top teams such as a 30–12 win over the Brisbane Broncos at Suncorp Stadium, a 42–0 annihilation of the Sydney Roosters at Brookvale Oval and a 34–14 win over the Gold Coast Titans at Skilled Park in round 17. In round 18 Manly avenged their opening round loss to bitter rivals and eventual preliminary finalists Cronulla with a 34–6 hammering of them at Toyota Stadium. In round 19, Manly once again faced historical rivals Parramatta and in a repeat of round 6, Manly lost halfback Matt Orford and lock Luke Williamson before the game, and after only minutes five-eighth Jamie Lyon and prop Jason King were forced off the field with injury. Despite the setbacks and an early challenge from the Eels, Manly ran away with the game and finished 28–10 winners.

Some hiccups against the Roosters in round 20, the Storm in round 22 and the Rabbitohs in round 23 meant Manly finished the regular season tied first with Melbourne and Cronulla but second on points differential and Manly missed out on claiming their first minor premiership since 1997. In the qualifying final Manly faced 7th placed St. George at Brookvale. This game was club legend Steve Menzies' last game at Brookvale and he opened the scoring with an unusual charge down try in which after kicking ahead to himself and falling over, the ball bounced up and hit him in the head before he finally grounded it. Manly Warringah were easy 38–6 winners and departing Dragons centre Mark Gasnier was seen on the sidelines crying. After getting the week off, Manly faced the history-making New Zealand Warriors whose late season charge got them into 8th place where they became the first 8th placed team to advance past qualifying finals with a dramatic and rare defeat of the Storm at Olympic Park. Despite an early challenge, Manly Warringah crushed the Warriors 32–6 and showcased their trademark wall of defence and attacking flair. With the win, Manly Warringah qualified for their 17th grand final, where in a rematch of the 2007 decider, they would play the Melbourne Storm who had bounced back from the Warriors' loss with wins over the Brisbane Broncos and Cronulla Sharks.

The story was very different for the Sea Eagles this time around as they decimated the Storm 40–0 to win their seventh premiership in front of 80,388 at ANZ Stadium. It was Michael Monaghan's replacement, the previously unknown Matt Ballin who scored the first try of the match. The game was also notable for winger Michael Robertson's hat-trick and retiring legend Steve Menzies' try 10 minutes from full-time, which he scored after coming back onto the field to replace the injured Steve Matai. Manly prop forward Brent Kite was awarded the Clive Churchill Medal after a powerhouse display which included a classy try in the 58th minute. This is the largest winning margin in a grand final in rugby league history.

2008 NRL season
Pos	Team	Pld	W	D	L	B	PF	PA	PD	Pts
1	Melbourne Storm	24	17	0	7	2	584	282	+302	38
2	Manly Warringah Sea Eagles (P)	24	17	0	7	2	645	355	+290	38
3	Cronulla-Sutherland Sharks	24	17	0	7	2	451	384	+67	38
4	Sydney Roosters	24	15	0	9	2	511	446	+65	34
5	Brisbane Broncos	24	14	1	9	2	560	452	+108	33
6	Canberra Raiders	24	13	0	11	2	640	527	+113	30
7	St George Illawarra Dragons	24	13	0	11	2	489	378	+111	30
8	New Zealand Warriors	24	13	0	11	2	502	567	-65	30
9	Newcastle Knights	24	12	0	12	2	516	486	+30	28
10	Wests Tigers	24	11	0	13	2	528	560	-32	26
11	Parramatta Eels	24	11	0	13	2	501	547	-46	26
12	Penrith Panthers	24	10	1	13	2	504	611	-107	25
13	Gold Coast Titans	24	10	0	14	2	476	586	-110	24
14	South Sydney Rabbitohs	24	8	0	16	2	453	666	-213	20
15	North Queensland Cowboys	24	5	0	19	2	474	638	-164	14
16	Canterbury-Bankstown Bulldogs	24	5	0	19	2	433	782	-349	14

== Regular season ==
Saturday 15 March	Manly-Warringah Sea Eagles	10 – 16	Cronulla-Sutherland Sharks	Brookvale Oval, Sydney
	Tries: Michael Bani, Anthony Watmough; Goals: Matt Orford (1/2)	[ Report]	Tries: Bryson Goodwin, Brett Kearney; Goals: Luke Covell (4/5)	Attendance: 15,424; Referee: Jarred Maxwell

Saturday 22 March	Newcastle Knights	13 – 12	Manly-Warringah Sea Eagles	EnergyAustralia Stadium, Newcastle
	Tries: Richard Faʻaoso, Chris Houston; Goals: Kurt Gidley (2/2); Field Goals: Scott Dureau (1)	[ Report]	Tries: Michael Bani, Jamie Lyon; Goals: Matt Orford (2/3)	Attendance: 18,117; Referee: Ben Cummins

Monday 31 March	Manly-Warringah Sea Eagles	52 – 6	New Zealand Warriors	Brookvale Oval, Sydney
	Tries: Michael Robertson (3), Brett Stewart (3), Anthony Watmough (2), Michael Bani, Matt Orford; Goals: Matt Orford (6/8); Jamie Lyon (0/1); Luke Williamson (0/1)	[ Report]	Tries: Lance Hohaia; Goals: Michael Witt (1/1)	Attendance: 10,175; Referee: Sean Hampstead

Sunday 6 April	Manly-Warringah Sea Eagles	20 – 2	South Sydney Rabbitohs	Brookvale Oval, Sydney
	Tries: Adam Cuthbertson, Jamie Lyon, Brett Stewart; Goals: Matt Orford (4/4)	[ Report]	Tries: Goals: Nathan Merritt (1/1)	Attendance: 14,426; Referee: Shayne Hayne

Friday 11 April	Melbourne Storm	26 – 4	Manly-Warringah Sea Eagles	Olympic Park Stadium, Melbourne
	Tries: Billy Slater (2), Ryan Hoffman, Greg Inglis, Anthony Quinn; Goals: Cameron Smith (3/6)	[ Report]	Tries: Michael Bani; Goals: Matt Orford (0/1)	Attendance: 13,632; Referee: Tony Archer

Friday 18 April	Parramatta Eels	16 – 20	Manly-Warringah Sea Eagles	Parramatta Stadium, Sydney
	Tries: Luke Burt, Chad Robinson; Goals: Luke Burt (4/4)	[ Report]	Tries: Michael Bani, Heath L'Estrange, Michael Robertson, Brett Stewart; Goals: Matt Orford (2/4)	Attendance: 14,025; Referee: Shayne Hayne

Saturday 26 April	Manly-Warringah Sea Eagles	30 – 22	Bulldogs	Brookvale Oval, Sydney
	Tries: Steven Bell, Adam Cuthbertson, Glen Hall, Brett Stewart, Glenn Stewart; Goals: Matt Orford (5/6)	[ Report]	Tries: Brent Crisp, Heka Nanai, Sonny Bill Williams, Tim Winitana; Goals: Brent Crisp (3/4)	Attendance: 15,229; Referee: Tony Archer

Bye

Sunday 11 May	Brisbane Broncos	12 – 30	Manly-Warringah Sea Eagles	Suncorp Stadium, Brisbane
	Tries: Michael Ennis, Denan Kemp; Goals: Michael Ennis (2/3)	[ Report]	Tries: Steven Bell, Brent Kite, Steve Menzies, Michael Robertson, Brett Stewart; Goals: Matt Orford (5/6)	Attendance: 27,469; Referee: Shayne Hayne

Saturday 17 May	Manly-Warringah Sea Eagles	38 – 6	North Queensland Cowboys	Bluetongue Stadium, Gosford
	Tries: Adam Cuthbertson (2), Michael Robertson (2), Nick Bradley-Qalilawa, Josh Perry, David Williams; Goals: Matt Orford (5/7)	[ Report]	Tries: Ben Farrar; Goals: John Williams (1/1)	Attendance: 9,343; Referee: Ben Cummins

Friday 23 May	Manly-Warringah Sea Eagles	18 – 20	St George Illawarra Dragons	Brookvale Oval, Sydney
	Tries: Steve Menzies, Michael Robertson, David Williams; Goals: Matt Orford (3/3)	[ Report]	Tries: Ben Hornby, Brett Morris, Jason Nightingale, Beau Scott; Goals: Jamie Soward (2/4)	Attendance: 12,058; Referee: Jason Robinson

Friday 30 May	Canberra Raiders	18 – 31	Manly-Warringah Sea Eagles	Canberra Stadium, Canberra
	Tries: Colin Best, Todd Carney, Trevor Thurling; Goals: Todd Carney (3/3)	[ Report]	Tries: Matt Ballin, Steve Matai, Steve Menzies, Michael Robertson, Anthony Watmough; Goals: Matt Orford (5/6); Field Goals: Matt Orford (1)	Attendance: 13,120; Referee: Sean Hampstead

Sunday 8 June	Manly-Warringah Sea Eagles	42 – 0	Sydney Roosters	Brookvale Oval, Sydney
	Tries: Steven Bell, David Williams, Nick Bradley-Qalilawa, Jamie Lyon, Matt Orford, Anthony Watmough; Goals: Matt Orford (5/8)	[ Report]	Tries: Goals:	Attendance: 13,842; Referee: Shayne Hayne

Bye

Sunday 22 June	New Zealand Warriors	14 – 20	Manly-Warringah Sea Eagles	Mt Smart Stadium, Auckland
	Tries: Aidan Kirk, Simon Mannering, Manu Vatuvei; Goals: Michael Witt (1/3)	[ Report]	Tries: Matt Ballin, Brent Kite, Brett Stewart, Glenn Stewart; Goals: Matt Orford (2/4)	Attendance: 7,141; Referee: Tony De Las Heras

Saturday 28 June	Manly-Warringah Sea Eagles	28 – 12	Newcastle Knights	Bluetongue Stadium, Gosford
	Tries: Steven Bell, Jamie Lyon, Steve Matai, Anthony Watmough, David Williams; Goals: Matt Orford (4/5)	[ Report]	Tries: James McManus (2), Cooper Vuna; Goals: Wes Naiqama (0/3)	Attendance: 13,798; Referee: Shayne Hayne

Friday 4 July	Gold Coast Titans	14 – 34	Manly-Warringah Sea Eagles	Skilled Park, Gold Coast
	Tries: Anthony Laffranchi (2); Goals: Mat Rogers (3/3)	[ Report]	Tries: Brett Stewart (2), Steven Bell, Jamie Lyon, Steve Menzies, David Williams; Goals: Matt Orford (5/6)	Attendance: 21,374; Referee: Jarred Maxwell

Saturday 12 July	Cronulla-Sutherland Sharks	6 – 34	Manly-Warringah Sea Eagles	Toyota Stadium, Sydney
	Tries: Paul Gallen; Goals: Luke Covell (1/1)	[ Report]	Tries: Glenn Stewart (2), Matt Ballin, Josh Perry, Michael Robertson, Brett Stewart; Goals: Matt Orford (3/4); Goals: Jamie Lyon (2/2)	Attendance: 18,217; Referee: Jason Robinson

Friday 18 July	Manly-Warringah Sea Eagles	28 – 10	Parramatta Eels	Brookvale Oval, Sydney
	Tries: Steve Matai (2), David Williams, Matt Ballin, Anthony Watmough; Goals: David Williams (2/6)	[ Report]	Tries: Mark Riddell, Tony Williams; Goals: Krisnan Inu (1/2)	Attendance: 18,970; Referee: Shayne Hayne

Sunday 27 July	Sydney Roosters	34 – 12	Manly-Warringah Sea Eagles	Sydney Football Stadium, Sydney
	Tries: Amos Roberts (2), Mitchell Aubusson, Shaun Kenny-Dowall, Sam Perrett, Iosia Soliola; Goals: Craig Fitzgibbon (5/6)	[ Report]	Tries: Michael Robertson, Brett Stewart; Goals: Steve Matai (2/2)	Attendance: 22,681; Referee: Jason Robinson

Friday 1 August	Manly-Warringah Sea Eagles	30 – 10	Penrith Panthers	Brookvale Oval, Sydney
	Tries: Steven Bell, Glen Hall, Steve Menzies, Michael Robertson, Brett Stewart, David Williams; Goals: Steve Matai (3/5); David Williams (0/1)	[ Report]	Tries: Michael Jennings, Nathan Smith; Goals: Michael Gordon (1/2)	Attendance: 7,862; Referee: Shayne Hayne

Friday 8 August	Manly-Warringah Sea Eagles	10 – 16	Melbourne Storm	Brookvale Oval, Sydney
	Tries: Glen Hall, David Williams; Goals: Steve Matai (1/2)	[ Report]	Tries: Cooper Cronk, Israel Folau, Matt Geyer; Goals: Cameron Smith (2/3)	Attendance: 18,442; Referee: Tony Archer

Sunday 17 August	South Sydney Rabbitohs	40 – 32	Manly-Warringah Sea Eagles	Sydney Football Stadium, Sydney
	Tries: Nathan Merritt (3), Roy Asotasi, Issac Luke, Jamie Simpson, Fetuli Talanoa; Goals: Issac Luke (4/6); Chris Sandow (2/2)	[ Report]	Tries: Steve Menzies (2), Brett Stewart (2), Steven Bell, Josh Perry; Goals: Steve Matai (2/3); Matt Orford (2/3)	Attendance: 11,000; Referee: Steve Lyons

Saturday 23 August	Wests Tigers	16 – 48	Manly-Warringah Sea Eagles	ANZ Stadium, Sydney
	Tries: Daine Laurie (2), Beau Ryan; Goals: Brett Hodgson (2/3)	[ Report]	Tries: Glen Hall (2), Steve Menzies (2), Brett Stewart (2), Steven Bell, Michael Robertson, Glenn Stewart; Goals: Matt Orford (5/8); Steve Matai (1/1)	Attendance: 27,564; Referee: Tony Archer

Monday 1 September	Manly-Warringah Sea Eagles	28 – 10	Gold Coast Titans	Brookvale Oval, Sydney
	Tries: Steve Matai (2), Glen Hall, Brent Kite, Brett Stewart; Goals: Matt Orford (4/5)	[ Report]	Tries: Jordan Atkins, Gavin Cooper; Goals: Scott Prince (1/2)	Attendance: 14,755; Referee: Jason Robinson

Saturday 23 August	Penrith Panthers	16 – 34	Manly-Warringah Sea Eagles	CUA Stadium, Sydney
	Tries: Paul Aiton, Tony Puletua, Nathan Smith; Goals: Michael Gordon (2/3)	[ Report]	Tries: David Williams (2), Steven Bell, Steve Menzies, Brett Stewart, Glenn Stewart; Goals: Matt Orford (4/5); Jamie Lyon (1/1)	Attendance: 6,086; Referee: Jarred Maxwell

== Finals ==
=== Qualifying Final ===
Saturday 13 September	Manly-Warringah Sea Eagles	38 – 6	St George Illawarra Dragons	Brookvale Oval, Sydney
	Tries: Heath L'Estrange, Steve Menzies, Josh Perry, Michael Robertson, Brett Stewart, Anthony Watmough, David Williams; Goals: Matt Orford (5/7); Steve Menzies (0/1)	[ Report]	Tries: Mark Gasnier; Goals: Mark Gasnier (1/1)	Attendance: 19,227; Referee: Shayne Hayne

=== Preliminary Final ===
Saturday 27 September	Manly-Warringah Sea Eagles	32 – 6	New Zealand Warriors	Sydney Football Stadium, Sydney
	Tries: Brett Stewart (2), Steve Matai, Steve Menzies, Matt Orford, Michael Robertson, Glenn Stewart; Goals: Matt Orford (1/5); Steve Matai (1/2)	[ Report]	Tries: Aidan Kirk; Goals: Lance Hohaia (1/1)	Attendance: 32,095; Referee: Shayne Hayne

=== Grand Final ===
Sunday 5 October

Manly-Warringah Sea Eagles	40 – 0	Melbourne Storm
Tries: Michael Robertson (3); Matt Ballin; Brent Kite; David Williams; Steve Menzies; Steven Bell; Goals: Matt Orford (0/2); Steve Matai (2/4); Jamie Lyon (2/2)		Tries: Goals:

ANZ Stadium, Sydney
Attendance: 80,388
Referee: Tony Archer
Player of the Match: Brent Kite

Manly-Warringah	Melbourne

FB	1	Brett Stewart
LW	2	Michael Robertson
RC	3	Steven Bell
LC	4	Steve Matai
RW	5	David Williams
FE	6	Jamie Lyon
HB	7	Matt Orford (c)
PR	8	Brent Kite
HK	9	Matt Ballin
PR	10	Josh Perry
SR	11	Anthony Watmough
SR	12	Glenn Hall
LK	13	Glenn Stewart
Substitutions:
IC	14	Heath L'Estrange
IC	15	Mark Bryant
IC	16	Jason King
IC	17	Steve Menzies
Coach:
(Australia) Des Hasler

FB	1	Billy Slater
RW	2	Steve Turner
LC	3	Matt Geyer
RC	4	Israel Folau
LW	5	Anthony Quinn
FE	6	Greg Inglis
HB	7	Cooper Cronk (c)
PR	8	Jeff Lima
HK	9	Russ Aitken
PR	10	Brett White
SR	11	Michael Crocker
SR	12	Jeremy Smith
LK	13	Dallas Johnson
Substitutions:
IC	14	Scott Anderson
IC	15	Adam Blair
IC	16	Sika Manu
IC	17	Antonio Kaufusi
Coach:
(Australia) Craig Bellamy

1st Half
The grand final's first quarter was played end to end with each side able to hold the other's attacking opportunities out. In the twenty-fourth minute the Sea Eagles' hooker Matt Ballin at close-range ran from dummy-half and crashed over the try-line. After the video referee ruled the grounding successful, Matt Orford's conversion attempt hit the upright and missed so the score remained 4 - 0 with fifteen minutes of the first half remaining. Nine minutes later, the Sea Eagles were again on the attack and from ten metres out, moved the ball through the hands to the left wing where Michael Robertson dived over in the corner. The video referee was again called upon to examine the try, which was ruled to have been successfully scored just as Robertson's feet were being dragged onto the sideline by a defender. Orford's difficult kick went wide, so the Sea Eagles' lead remained at 8-0 with under five minutes of the half remaining which were played out with no further points scored.

2nd Half
In the forty-seventh minute, The Sea Eagles were within twenty metres of the Storm's try-line when Matt Orford at first receiver put a grubber kick into the left corner which bounced up perfectly for Michael Robertson racing through on the wing to grab and dive over for his second try. Kicking duty was handed to Steve Matai who coolly converted Robertson's try from next to the sideline, bringing his side's lead to 14–0. Three minutes later, and from a similar attacking position, the Sea Eagles kept the ball alive, a pass from Brett Stewart fifteen metres out arriving at the feet of Steve Matai who, with only one defender before him, picked it up and passed to Michael Robertson to dive over again in the same corner. Matai's second sideline conversion attempt missed, so the Sea Eagles were leading 18–0. In the fifty-seventh minute the Sea Eagles were again down in the Storm's half and on the last tackle decided to run the ball, which was kept alive and passed through seven sets of hands before going to a charging Brent Kite who stretched out of the tackle and slammed the ball down under the posts. Matai kicked the easy conversion and it was sea Eagles 24, Storm 0. Ten minutes later the Sea Eagles got another try when, from within the Storm's ten-metre line, they moved the ball out to David Williams on the right wing to dive over in the corner. The conversion attempt by Matai went wide so the Sea Eagles were leading 28–0. In the seventy-second minute the Sea Eagles ran the ball down toward the left corner with Robertson passing back in to Steve Menzies, who was playing in his 349th and final NRL match to crash over for a try, his 180th. Jamie Lyon took over the goal kicking and converted Menzies' try to give Manly a 34–0 lead. However, the finale was to come at the seventy-five-minute mark when from their forty-metre line, Sea Eagles second rower Glenn Hall burst into open space, passing back inside for Brett Stewart who was running through in support. Stewart was chased down just short of the try-line by Storm halfback Cooper Cronk, but he managed to flick the ball back without looking into the arms of Steven Bell to also get a try in his last game at the club. Jamie Lyon's simple conversion put the final score at 40–0.

It was at the time the fourth-biggest loss in the Storm's history.

The Manly Warringah Sea Eagles defeated the Melbourne Storm 40–0, scoring eight tries, four of which were converted. This is the highest Rugby League Grand Final margin in Australian history, eclipsing the 1975 NSWRFL season's Grand Final where Eastern Suburbs defeated St George, 38–0 at the Sydney Cricket Ground. It is also the first time that a team has been kept scoreless in a Grand Final since the 1978 NSWRL Grand Final Replay, where Cronulla lost to Manly 16–0. Sea Eagles forward Brent Kite was named man-of-the-match and received the Clive Churchill Medal.

The 2008 Grand Final was the last match for Super League-bound Steve Menzies of Manly. Playing in this match brought his career games played to 349, equalling the current record from Terry Lamb.

== Player statistics ==
Note: Games and (sub) show total games played, e.g. 1 (1) is 2 games played.

Player	Games (sub)	Tries	Goals	FG	Points
(New Zealand) Jack Afamasaga	1 (1)	1			4
(Australia) Matt Ballin	27	5			20
(Australia) Michael Bani	8	5			20
(Australia) Steven Bell	24	11			44
(Fiji) Nick Bradley-Qalilawa	2	2			8
(Australia) Mark Bryant	(25)				
(Australia) Adam Cuthbertson	2 (19)	4			16
(Australia) Glen Hall	11 (9)	6			24
(Australia) Jason King	7 (8)				
(Australia) Brent Kite	25 (2)	4			16
(Australia) Heath L'Estrange	(24)	2			8
(Australia) Jamie Lyon (vc)	20 (1)	5	5/6		30
(New Zealand) Steve Matai	21	7	12/19		52
(Italy) Vic Mauro	(1)				
(Australia) Steve Menzies	17 (9)	13	0/1		52
(Australia) Phil Morwood	(1)				
(Australia) Shane Neumann	1				
(Australia) Matt Orford (c)	26	3	78/112	1	169
(Australia) Josh Perry	25 (1)	4			16
(Scotland) Michael Robertson	27	18			72
(Australia) Jeff Robson	2				
(Australia) Brett Stewart	24	22			88
(Australia) Glenn Stewart	26	7			28
(New Zealand) David Vaealiki	2				
(Australia) Anthony Watmough	22	8			32
(Australia) David Williams	20	14	2/7		60
(Australia) Luke Williamson	11 (7)		0/1		
TOTAL		140	97/146	1	755

== Representative Players ==
=== International ===
- Australia – Brent Kite, Josh Perry, Brett Stewart*, Glenn Stewart, Anthony Watmough, David Williams
- New Zealand – Steve Matai
- Fiji – Nick Bradley-Qalilawa
- Scotland – Michael Robertson

* Brett Stewart was originally selected in Australia's 2008 World Cup squad but withdrew with a shoulder injury.

=== State ===
- New South Wales – Brett Stewart

=== City vs Country ===
- Country Origin – Glenn Stewart
