= Glenn Stewart =

Australia international rugby league footballer (born 1984)

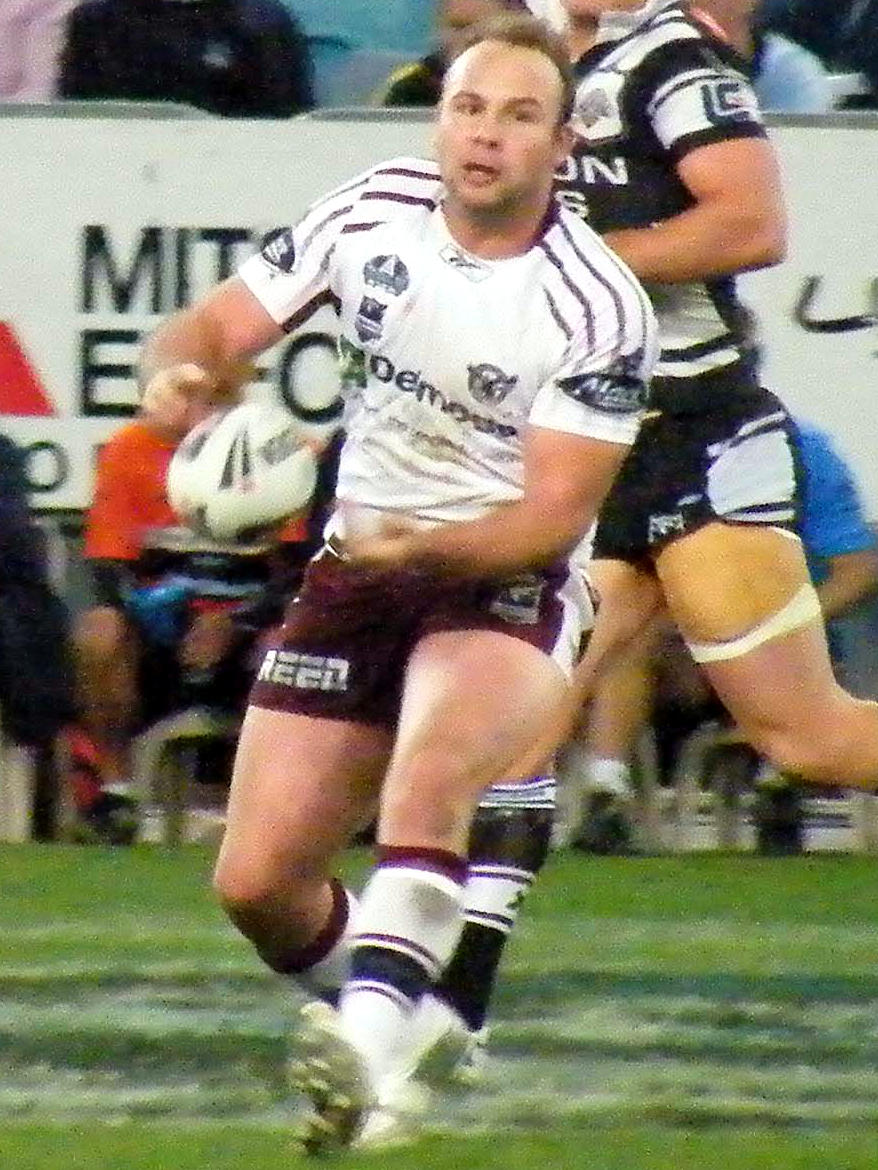

Personal information
- Born: 11 January 1984 (age 42) Wollongong, New South Wales, Australia

Playing information
- Height: 180 cm (5 ft 11 in)
- Weight: 105 kg (16 st 7 lb)
- Position: Lock, Second-row
Club
Years	Team	Pld	T	G	FG	P
2003–14	Manly Sea Eagles	185	27	0	0	108
2015	South Sydney	19	1	0	0	4
2016	Catalans Dragons	30	3	0	0	12
2017	Leigh Centurions	24	0	0	0	0
	Total	258	31	0	0	124
Representative
Years	Team	Pld	T	G	FG	P
2008–11	NSW Country	3	0	0	0	0
2008–09	Australia	5	0	0	0	0
2009–12	New South Wales	5	0	0	0	0
2009	Prime Minister's XIII	1	1	0	0	4
- Relatives: Brett Stewart (brother)

Glenn Stewart (born 11 January 1984) is an Australian former professional rugby league footballer who last played for the Leigh Centurions in the Super League. An Australia international and New South Wales State of Origin representative second-row, he previously played for the Manly Sea Eagles and the South Sydney Rabbitohs in the NRL, winning the 2008 and 2011 premierships as well as the Clive Churchill Medal with the former.

== Background ==
He is the older brother of former teammate Brett Stewart.

== Professional playing career ==
=== Manly-Warringah Sea Eagles ===
==== 2000s ====
Glenn Stewart made his first grade debut for Manly in Round 20 of the 2003 NRL season, playing from the bench in a 26–20 win over the Brisbane Broncos at Suncorp Stadium in Brisbane. The first time he and brother Brett played together in first grade was in Round 18 of the 2004 season when the Sea Eagles defeated the Wests Tigers 26–18 at the home of Manly, Brookvale Oval on 11 July.

Between 2003 and 2006, Stewart only played 19 games for the Sea Eagles, often finding himself in their NSW Cup side due to the presence of established back rowers Ben Kennedy, Anthony Watmough, Luke Williamson, and Manly club legend Steve Menzies. With Kennedy's retirement from playing at the end of the 2006 NRL season, coach Des Hasler gave "Gifty" his chance to cement a first grade place in the team from 2007. He grabbed the opportunity with both hands, playing 26 games for the season, mostly in the second-row.

Stewart played in the 2007 NRL Grand Final defeat by the Melbourne Storm. Early in the second half of the Grand Final, his brother Brett was knocked out in a legal tackle by the Storm's Michael Crocker and Billy Slater while attempting to catch a mid-field bomb.

In 2008, Stewart's form for Manly had started to make people sit up and take notice. He made his representative debut when he was selected on the bench for Country Origin in the annual City vs Country Origin match, played in his home town of Wollongong at the WIN Stadium (the game ended in a 22-all draw).

He again played in 26 games for the season, and played at lock forward in the record breaking 40–0 victory over the Melbourne Storm in the 2008 NRL Grand Final.

In August 2008, Stewart was named in the preliminary 46-man Kangaroos squad for the 2008 Rugby League World Cup, and in October 2008 he was selected in the final 24-man Australia squad. Stewart was one of five Manly players selected, the others being front rowers Brent Kite and Josh Perry, Anthony Watmough and rookie winger David Williams. Brett Stewart, who was in superlative form for Manly during the second half of the season and through the finals (ending the year as the NRL's leading try scorer with 22), was originally selected but was forced to withdraw with a shoulder injury.

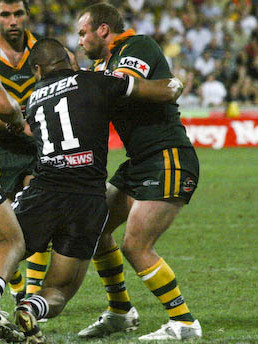
Stewart playing for the Kangaroos in 2008

Stewart played in the second row in Australia's shock 34–20 loss to New Zealand in the World Cup final played at Suncorp Stadium.

Following an outstanding season for the Sea Eagles, Stewart was voted the Dally M Second-Rower of the Year for 2008.

On 1 March 2009, Stewart played for Manly in their 28–20 victory over 2008 Super League champions Leeds Rhinos at the Elland Road ground in Leeds, England. It was Manly's first ever World Club Challenge victory after having lost their only previous game against Wigan in 1987. Again his brother Brett was the star for Manly, scoring two tries and setting up a third in the 5 tries to 4 win in front of 32,569 fans, including a number of Manly supporters who had travelled to England to watch the team play.

Stewart, made his test debut against New Zealand in Australia's opening RLWC 08 game on 26 October at the Sydney Football Stadium playing in the Second-row. He was selected for Australia in the 2009 Anzac Test match against New Zealand in Brisbane on 8 May 2009, with the Kangaroos reversing the WCF result by routing the World Champions 38–10. As of 2014, this was the last time Glenn Stewart played a test match for Australia.

Stewart who many fans and critics had taken note of his ball playing skills and that from lock he often played as an extra Five-eighth for Manly on the right hand side of their attack forming a strong partnership with centre and captain Jamie Lyon, was to make his State of Origin debut for New South Wales in game 1 of the 2009 series at Melbourne's Etihad Stadium, but was ruled out with suspension. He went on to make his debut in Game 2 at Sydney's ANZ Stadium on 24 June where he was selected on the bench (Queensland won the game 24-14 and consequently the series having won Game 1).

After Manly lost their opening four games of the 2009 season, the season stabilised somewhat, though the Eagles were missing a number of players through injury for large periods of the season.

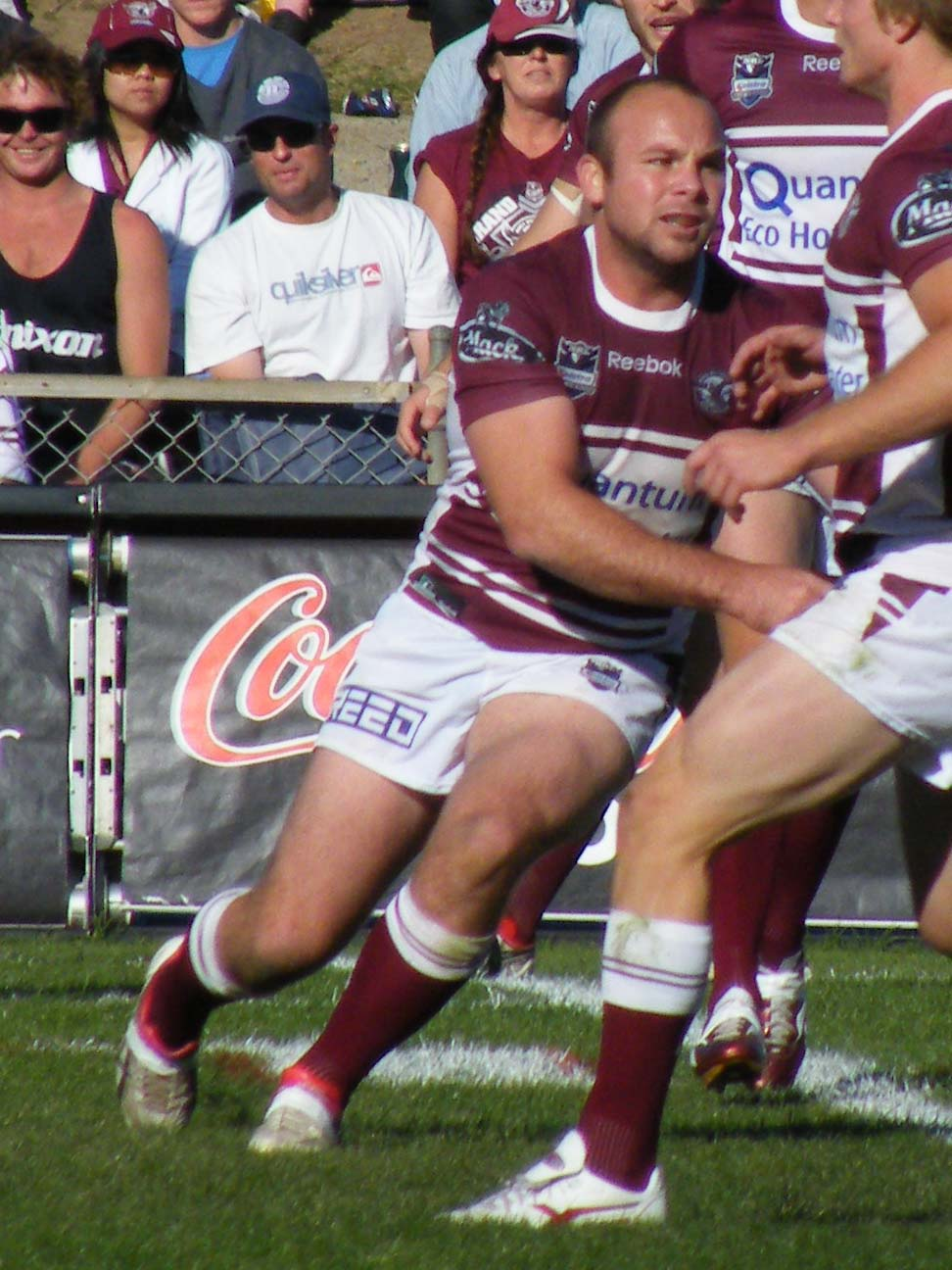
Stewart playing for Manly in 2009

After scraping into the finals in 5th place, Manly were bundled out in the first week by Melbourne in a 40-12 hiding at Etihad Stadium.

==== 2010s ====
Stewart was suspended for three matches for his role in the infamous "Battle of Brookvale" in which he traded blows with Melbourne's Adam Blair after they had both been sin-binned for their roles in an earlier brawl (which started the whole fracas in the first place). The timing of the suspension meant that for Stewart to play again in 2011 for Manly, the Sea Eagles had to make the 2011 NRL Grand Final. This they did with ease and coach Des Hasler immediately returned Stewart to the starting side for the Grand Final to be played against the New Zealand Warriors. Stewart repaid his coach's faith with a best on ground performance in Manly's 24–10 win (and 8th premiership) culminating in his winning the Clive Churchill Medal.

With less than one minute to go before half time, Stewart put in a grubber kick on his own 20m line for Manly winger Michael Robertson who regathered and raced 35m upfield before passing inside to hooker Matt Ballin who was then tackled only 5m from scoring a try. The resulting play saw halfback (and the NRL's Dally M Rookie of the Year) Daly Cherry-Evans score beside the posts to give Manly a 12-2 and ultimately winning lead going into half time. Sixteen minutes into the second-half Stewart then backed up his other winger William Hopoate and received a behind-the-back pass to score his first Grand Final try, joining his younger brother Brett who had scored the opening try of the game.

In Round 22 2013 against the Warriors, Stewart became the only lock in 2013 to have 4 try assists, In a game where Manly won 27–12 with Stewart having an involvement in every try scored for Manly.

As of 27 April 2014, the Manly Sea Eagles have never lost a game in which both Glenn and Brett Stewart have scored a try.

=== South Sydney Rabbitohs ===
On 22 April 2014, Stewart signed a two-year contract with the South Sydney Rabbitohs starting in 2015, after failing to gain a new contract from Manly. In Round 8 of the 2015 season, he suffered a thumb injury that saw him sidelined until Round 16.

=== Catalans Dragons ===
On 10 September 2015, Stewart signed a 3-year contract with French-based Super League club Catalans Dragons starting in 2016, after getting a release from the final year of his Rabbitohs contract.

=== Leigh Centurions ===
Stewart left the Catalans Dragons due to family reasons with the Leigh Centurions favourites for his signature Stewart signed for them on a 2-year deal but didn't have the best of seasons with Leigh relegated at the end of the campaign leaving his future with them unknown with Hull KR linked with the back rower.

== Statistics ==
Year	Team	Games	Tries	Pts
2003	Manly-Warringah	2		
2004	Manly-Warringah	5	1	4
2005	Manly-Warringah	5		
2006	Manly-Warringah	7	2	8
2007	Manly-Warringah	26	3	12
2008	Manly-Warringah	26	7	28
2009	Manly-Warringah	23	3	12
2010	Manly-Warringah	23	5	20
2011	Manly-Warringah	23	4	16
2012	Manly-Warringah	17	2	8
2013	Manly-Warringah	22		
2014	Manly-Warringah	6		
2015	South Sydney	18		
2016	Catalans Dragons	30	3	12
2017	Leigh Centurions	24		
	Totals	258	31	124

Preceded by Darius Boyd (St. George Illawarra Dragons)	Clive Churchill Medallist; 2011	Succeeded by Cooper Cronk (Melbourne Storm)
