= 2011 NRL Grand Final =

Final game of the 2011 NRL season

Manly Warringah Sea Eagles	New Zealand Warriors
24	10
	1	2	Total
MAN	12	12	24
NZL	2	8	10
- Date: 2 October 2011
- Stadium: ANZ Stadium
- Location: Sydney
- Clive Churchill Medal: Glenn Stewart (MAN)
- Australian National anthem NZ National anthem: (Australia) Australian Youth Choir (New Zealand) Elizabeth Marvelly
- Referee: Tony Archer; Matt Cecchin
- Attendance: 81,988

Broadcast partners
- Broadcasters: Nine Network
- Commentators: Ray Warren; Peter Sterling; Phil Gould

The 2011 NRL Grand Final was the conclusive and premiership-deciding game of the NRL's 2011 Telstra Premiership season. It was played between the Manly Warringah Sea Eagles and the New Zealand Warriors on the afternoon of Sunday, 2 October, and it was the first time the two sides have met in a grand final. Manly won the match, 24–10, for the club's eighth premiership.

The grand final breakfast, an annual function attended by both teams and hundreds of guests, was held the Thursday prior to Sunday's match at Sydney's Sydney Convention and Exhibition Centre in Darling Harbour and was screened live on Australian television.

== Background ==
2011's NRL season was the 104th season of professional rugby league football club competition in Australia, and the fourteenth and last run by the National Rugby League's partnership committee of the Australian Rugby League and News Ltd. The NRL's main championship, called the 2011 Telstra Premiership due to sponsorship from Telstra, was contested by sixteen teams for the fifth consecutive year. Of these sixteen, the Manly Warringah Sea Eagles and the New Zealand Warriors finished 2nd and 6th on the competition ladder respectively. It was the first time the sides had faced each other in a season decider and the last time they played in a finals match was a preliminary match in 2008 where the Manly club won 28–6. It was the third time in five years Manly featured in a grand final, with their previous being their record 40–0 victory over the Melbourne Storm in 2008. It was the second time in the Warriors' 16-year history that they played for their maiden premiership title, with their first attempt losing to the Sydney Roosters in 2002. The sides played each other once in round 6 during the regular season where the Sea Eagles won 20–10 at Brookvale Oval.

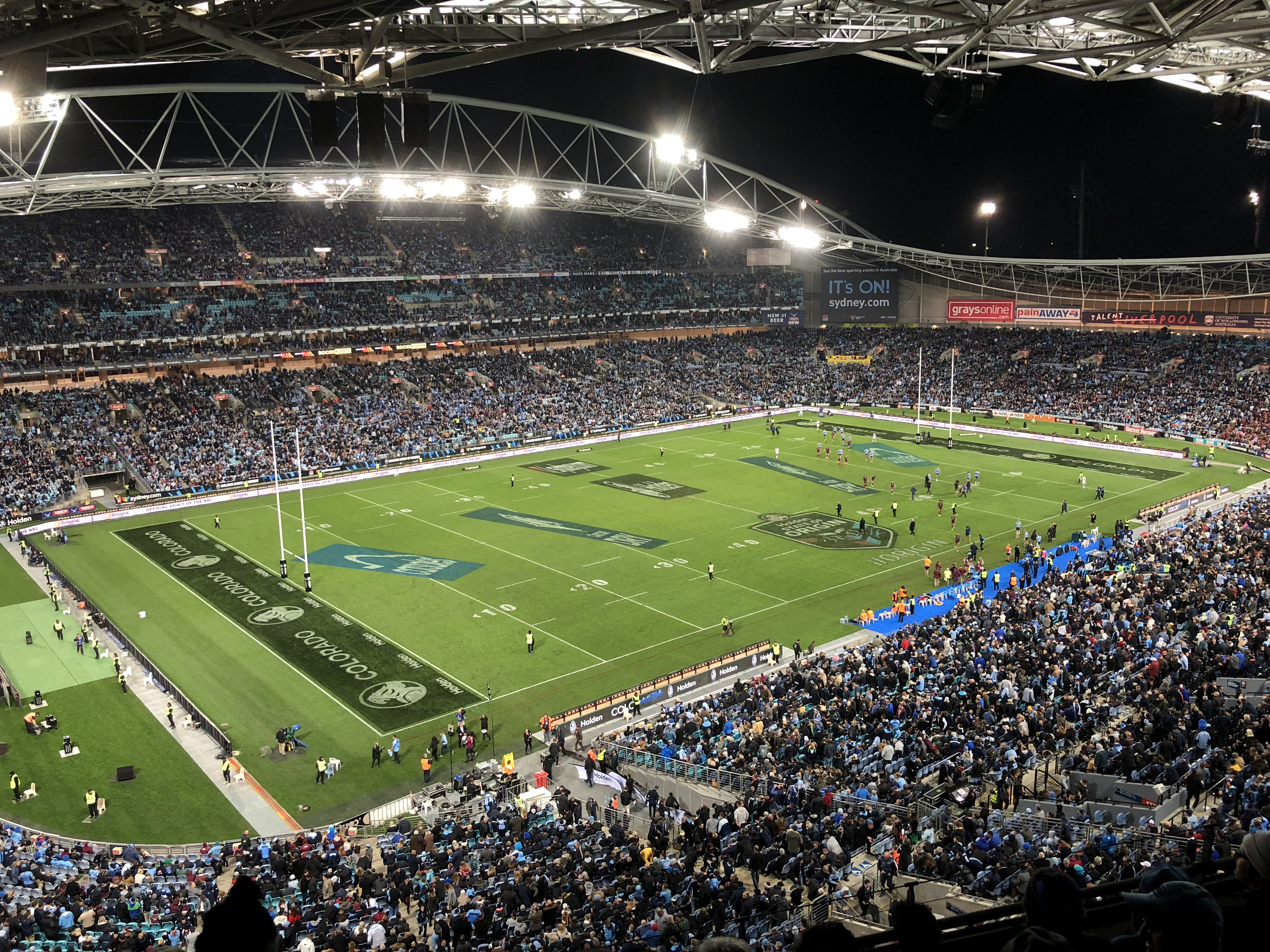
ANZ Stadium, where the match was played

	Sea Eagles	Warriors
Rd.1	Storm	Eels
Rd.2	Roosters	Tigers
Rd.3	Knights	Dragons
Rd.4	Rabbitohs	Sharks
Rd.5	Sharks	Roosters
Rd.6	Warriors	Sea Eagles
Rd.7	Panthers	Storm
Rd.8	Cowboys	Panthers
Rd.9	Raiders	Titans
Rd.10	Titans	Knights
Rd.11	Bye	Rabbitohs
Rd.12	Broncos	Bye
Rd.13	Bulldogs	Roosters
Rd.14	Cowboys	Tigers
Rd.15	Eels	Cowboys
Rd.16	Dragons	Storm
Rd.17	Bye	Bye
Rd.18	Rabbitohs	Titans
Rd.19	Knights	Bulldogs
Rd.20	Panthers	Rabbitohs
Rd.21	Tigers	Raiders
Rd.22	Roosters	Broncos
Rd.23	Eels	Knights
Rd.24	Bulldogs	Panthers
Rd.25	Storm	Dragons
Rd.26	Broncos	Cowboys
QF	Cowboys	Broncos
SF	DNP	Tigers
PF	Broncos	Storm
Legend: Win Loss

=== Manly Warringah Sea Eagles ===
The Manly Warringah Sea Eagles finished second on the competition ladder behind the Melbourne Storm accumulating 40 competition points, winning 18 of 24 matches and being undefeated at their traditional home ground Brookvale Oval. However, their run into the finals series threatened to be disrupted by suspensions arising from a wild brawl in a clash with Melbourne in the penultimate round of the season. Four Manly players received suspensions, including a three-match ban for key forward Glenn Stewart. Despite the suspensions, Manly qualified for the Grand Final with ease, defeating Queensland teams the North Queensland Cowboys 42–8 in the qualifying final and the Brisbane Broncos 26–14 in the preliminary after earning a weeks break. Steve Matai and Tony Williams were reported to the NRL's match review committee for incidents during the win over Brisbane, raising the prospect that they may be suspended for the Grand Final. However, the committee refused to charge Matai, while Williams' clean record enabled him to avoid a suspension by pleading guilty to a charge of effecting an unlawful high tackle. However, Manly would play the Grand Final without their co-captain Jason King, who suffered a pectoral injury in Round 22 of the season, and winger David Williams with a neck injury.

It would be Manly's 18th Grand Final appearance, a record seventh consecutive decade in which the club had achieved the feat, and a chance for the club to win its eighth premiership. Coach Des Hasler made his third Grand Final in the position after appearing in three others as a Manly player.

=== New Zealand Warriors ===
For only the second time in the club's entire history the New Zealand Warriors would search for their first premiership title up against the second-placed Manly side. Having finished sixth on the competition ladder with 32 points, they lost their first match of the finals series to the Brisbane Broncos in their heaviest defeat of the season losing 40–10 but however earned a second chance, only due to the two lower-ranking teams also losing. They then upset the Wests Tigers in the semi-finals after many gave them a slim chance of winning and they were down 18–6 at half time before mounting a comeback to be down just 20–18 with a few minutes remaining before Kristian Inu scored the match winner for the Warriors as they won 22–20.

The New Zealand Warriors then went on to post a major upset over the 2011 minor premiers the Melbourne Storm at AAMI Park in their Grand Final qualifier. The New Zealand Warriors were down 6-0 after 5 minutes due to some poor defence that Gareth Widdop took advantage of to put Sika Manu through a gap to score; the try was converted by Cameron Smith. the Warriors would hit back in the following dozen minutes through Bill Tupou and James Maloney scoring in the 12th and 16th minutes for the Warriors to lead 12–6. The Melbourne side would hit back through a Beau Champion try in 36th minute which Cameron Smith would convert to level the scores at 12-12. Before half time the Warriors were given a penalty which they opted to kick a penalty goal which James Maloney successfully converted for the Warriors to lead 14–12 at half time. The second half was a heated battle with the Warriors starving Melbourne of the ball and any good field position throughout the entire 40 minutes as the Warriors defence superbly defending anything the Melbourne Storm threw at them. The Warriors were believed to have scored in the 72nd minute through Lewis Brown only for the try to be disallowed due to an earlier knock on from Kevin Locke but the Lewis Brown would then go on to score in the 77th minute after some nifty footwork from Warriors young gun Shaun Johnson. James Maloney would beautifully convert a sideline conversion to put any hope of a Storm comeback impossible. This win would then qualify New Zealand for their second ever Grand Final.

The Grand Final was Ivan Cleary's last match as coach of the club, having signed to take over the Penrith Panthers the following season. Coincidentally, his last match as a player was when he was the fullback in the New Zealand Warriors side that lost the 2002 Grand Final to the Sydney Roosters, another club Cleary played for in the NRL. Cleary grew up on Sydney's northern beaches, and started his professional career with Manly playing alongside Des Hasler, now his opposing coach.

The New Zealand Warriors also fielded teams in the NSW Cup and Toyota Cup Grand Finals, thus becoming the first team since the Sydney Roosters in 2004 to field sides in three different-grade Grand Finals; at the time, the other two grades were the Jersey Flegg Cup and the Premier League Cup. The Warriors' Toyota Cup successfully defended its 2010 title defeating the North Queensland Cowboys in golden point extra time by the scoreline of 31–30.

== Match day ==
Manly Warringah Sea Eagles	Posit.	New Zealand Warriors
1. Brett Stewart	Fullback	1. Kevin Locke
2. Michael Robertson	Wing	2. Bill Tupou
3. Jamie Lyon (c)	Centre	3. Lewis Brown
4. Steve Matai	Centre	4. Krisnan Inu
5. Will Hopoate	Wing	5. Manu Vatuvei
6. Kieran Foran	Five-eighth	6. James Maloney
7. Daly Cherry-Evans	Halfback	7. Shaun Johnson
8. Joe Galuvao	Prop	15. Russell Packer
9. Matt Ballin	Hooker	14. Lance Hohaia
10. Brent Kite	Prop	10. Jacob Lillyman
11. Anthony Watmough	Second-row	17. Elijah Taylor
12. Tony Williams	Second-row	12. Simon Mannering (c)
13. Glenn Stewart	Lock	13. Micheal Luck
14. Shane Rodney	Interchange	8. Sam Rapira
15. Jamie Buhrer	Interchange	9. Aaron Heremaia
16. Vic Mauro	Interchange	11. Feleti Mateo
17. George Rose	Interchange	16. Ben Matulino
Des Hasler	Coach	Ivan Cleary

=== Pre-match ===
Two other matches were played before the NRL Grand Final. At 12.00pm, the New South Wales Cup Grand Final was held between the Auckland Vulcans and the Canterbury-Bankstown Bulldogs with the Canterbury side winning 30–28. The Toyota Cup Grand Final, featuring the youth teams of New Zealand Warriors and the North Queensland Cowboys, was played at 2.00pm, with the Warriors winning in extra time after North Queensland winger Kyle Feldt (who in the top-grade 2015 NRL Grand Final would score a try in the final seconds to force extra time) missed the opportunity to win the side's first premiership by missing a relatively simple conversion right on full-time.

Entertainment included performances by American singer Kelly Clarkson and Australian band Eskimo Joe, marking Clarkson's first appearance at the event since the 2003 NRL grand final. Clarkson performed her song "Mr. Know It All", accompanied by 300 dancers.

=== Match details ===
For the third year in a row, grand final day was a rainy one. Russell Packer, Lance Hohaia and Elijah Taylor swapped places with Sam Rapira, Aaron Heremaia and Feleti Mateo respectively from their interchange spots before the match.

==== First half ====
After a tight opening 28 minutes, Manly prop George Rose struck Aaron Heremaia's cheek with an elbow on the ground. However he was only penalised and put on report and was not sent off and James Maloney kicked a penalty goal to give New Zealand a 2–0 lead. However, Manly broke clear with two tries before half-time, the first just two minutes later to Brett Stewart, and the second just on half-time (which attracted controversy due to a possible obstruction in the lead-up) to Daly Cherry-Evans, one play after an audacious grubber kick from lock forward Glenn Stewart on his own 20 metre line which was gathered in by winger Michael Robertson who broke free despite a desperate attempt by Manu Vatuvei to tackle him.

==== Second half ====
Manly stretched its lead to 16 points after half-time following a try to Glenn Stewart, set up by a blind flick pass from William Hopoate just before he was pushed into touch. The New Zealand Warriors then scored two unconverted tries in the final fifteen minutes to Vatuvei (which attracted controversy due to the blatantly forward pass from Johnson to Vatuvei) and Elijah Taylor to narrow the deficit to eight points; however, Manly held onto its lead and celebrated victory with a try to captain Jamie Lyon in the final minute of play. Regular goal kicker Lyon then handed the ball to winger Robertson (who had played his last game for the club) for the conversion. Robertson calmly kicked the goal from out wide after the siren to bring the curtain down on both the game and his successful NRL career.

2011 NRL Grand Final

Sunday, 2 October
17:15 AEST (UTC+11)

Manly Warringah Sea Eagles	24 – 10	New Zealand Warriors
Tries: 4 B Stewart 30'; Cherry-Evans 40'; G Stewart 57'; Lyon 79'; Goals: 4 Lyon 31', 40', 59' (3/3); Robertson 80' (1/1)	1st: 12–2; 2nd: 12–8; Report	Tries: 2 Vatuvei 63'; Taylor 68'; Goals: 1 Maloney pen 28' (1/3)

ANZ Stadium, Sydney
Attendance: 81,988
Referees: Tony Archer, Matt Cecchin
Touch judges: Paul Holland, Daniel Eastwood
Clive Churchill Medal: Glen Stewart (Manly)

=== Post-match ===
Manly lock forward Glenn Stewart was awarded the Clive Churchill Medal as the player of the match. It was also the 10th time that brothers Brett and Glenn Stewart had each scored a try in the same game for Manly, with the club winning all 10 games. It was also the first time since the 1929 Premiership final when Alf and Frank O'Connor scored for South Sydney that two brothers had each scored a try in the premiership decider.

== See also ==
- 2012 World Club Challenge
