= 2008 NRL Grand Final =

Final game of Australian rugby league season

Manly-Warringah Sea Eagles	Melbourne Storm
40	0
	1	2	Total
MAN	8	32	40
MEL	0	0	0
- Date: 5 October 2008
- Stadium: ANZ Stadium
- Location: Sydney, NSW, Australia
- Clive Churchill Medal: Brent Kite (MAN)
- National anthem: Anthony Warlow
- Referee: Tony Archer
- Attendance: 80,388

Broadcast partners
- Broadcasters: Nine Network
- Commentators: Ray Warren; Peter Sterling; Phil Gould; Matthew Johns & Laurie Daley (sideline)

The 2008 NRL Grand Final was the conclusive and premiership-deciding game of the 2008 NRL season. It was played between the Manly Warringah Sea Eagles and the Melbourne Storm on Sunday, 5 October at ANZ Stadium in Sydney.

The 2008 Grand Final was the first Grand Final played in daylight since the introduction of the night Grand Final in 2001. The two teams had previously played in the 2007 NRL Grand Final, with Melbourne winning 34–8 (overturned due to salary-cap cheating and breaches). Manly reversed this result in 2008, winning 40–0; still the largest Grand Final winning margin in the history of the game, and the first Grand Final since 1978 where the losing team did not score a point.

== Background ==
Melbourne and Manly were also the teams which contested the 2007 NRL Grand Final, with Melbourne winning the game 34–8. During the 2008 regular season, the Manly Warringah Sea Eagles and the Melbourne Storm met twice: round 5 and round 22. The round 5 match in Melbourne went the Storm's way with a 26–4 victory. The round 22 match was a closer contest, with Melbourne winning again, 16–10 at Manly's Brookvale Oval. Manly went into the 2008 grand final not having beaten the Storm since round 11, 2007.

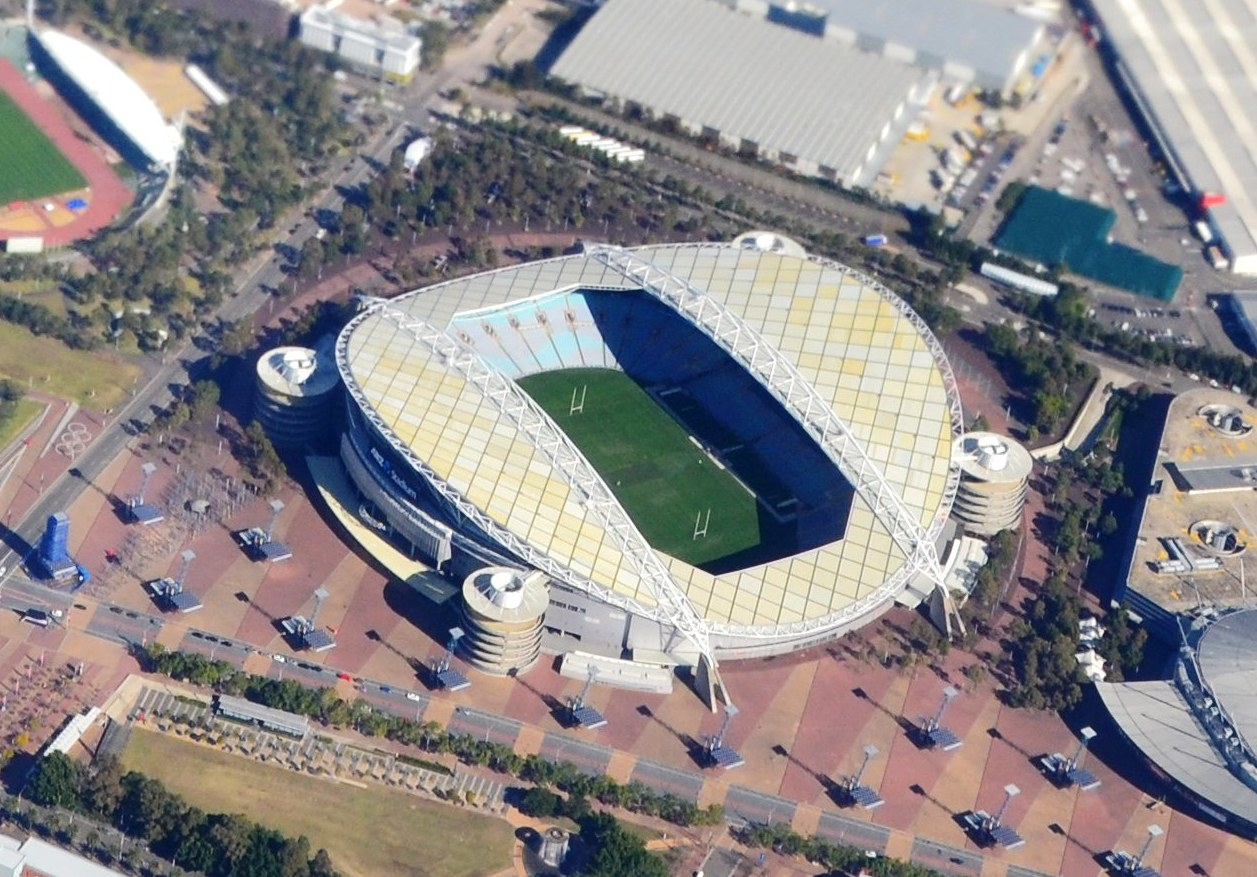
ANZ Stadium, where the match was played

=== Manly Warringah Sea Eagles ===
Manly also won 17 of their 24 games but lost the minor premiership to Melbourne on points differential, Melbourne having a 302 points difference compared to Manly's 290. Halfback Matt Orford was presented with the Dally M Award for his performance during the regular season, while fullback Brett Stewart was the league's top tryscorer with 19 tries.

In the first finals round, Manly defeated the St. George Illawarra Dragons 38–6. Manly then faced New Zealand in the preliminary final, beating them 32–6 to advance to their second grand final in a row, and their 17th overall (excluding the 1978 grand final replay).

=== Melbourne Storm ===
During the regular season, the Melbourne Storm won 17 of their 24 games, winning their third consecutive minor premiership on points differential from Manly and Cronulla. This was later stripped due to salary cap cheating.

In the qualifying final, Melbourne played the New Zealand Warriors. Melbourne lost this game 18–15 after a Warriors try from Michael Witt two minutes from full-time; becoming the first minor premier side since the introduction of the McIntyre final eight system in 1999 to lose to the eighth-placed team.

The loss against New Zealand saw Melbourne matched up against the Brisbane Broncos in the semi-final; the team the Storm lost against in the 2006 grand final. They narrowly won the game 16–14 after scoring a try 45 seconds before full-time, after a Broncos' handling mistake.

Melbourne captain Cameron Smith was controversially suspended for a grapple tackle during the Broncos game; the two-week suspension causing him to miss the rest of the finals season. Despite this suspension, Melbourne defeated the Cronulla-Sutherland Sharks 28–0 in the preliminary final, and entered their third consecutive grand final.

== Teams ==
Both teams featured 12 players who had played in the 2007 NRL Grand Final between these two clubs. This was to be Matt Geyer's last match before retirement, while long-serving Manly player Steve Menzies would play his last match for the club, having signed a contract to play with Bradford Bulls in the Super League. Mark Bryant played his 100th NRL match.

Team details
Manly Warringah Sea Eagles		Position	Melbourne Storm
Name	Number	Position	Number	Name
Brett Stewart	1	Fullback	1	Billy Slater
Michael Robertson	2	Wing	2	Steve Turner
Steven Bell	3	Centre	3	Matt Geyer
Steve Matai	4	Centre	4	Israel Folau
David Williams	5	Wing	5	Anthony Quinn
Jamie Lyon	6	Five eighth	6	Greg Inglis
Matt Orford (c)	7	Half back	7	Cooper Cronk (c)
Brent Kite	8	Prop forward	8	Jeff Lima
Matt Ballin	9	Hooker	9	Russell Aitken
Josh Perry	10	Prop forward	10	Brett White
Anthony Watmough	11	Second row	11	Michael Crocker
Glenn Hall	12	Second row	12	Jeremy Smith
Glenn Stewart	13	Lock forward	13	Dallas Johnson
Heath L'Estrange	14	Interchange	14	Scott Anderson
Mark Bryant	15	Interchange	15	Adam Blair
Jason King	16	Interchange	16	Sika Manu
Steve Menzies	17	Interchange	17	Antonio Kaufusi
Des Hasler		Coach		Craig Bellamy
RLP

== Match details ==
After the Australian National Anthem was performed by Anthony Warlow Melbourne kicked off.

=== First half ===
The grand final's first quarter was played end to end with each side able to hold the other's attacking opportunities out. In the twenty-fourth minute Manly hooker Matt Ballin at close-range ran from dummy-half and crashed over the try-line. After the video referee ruled the grounding successful, Matt Orford's conversion attempt hit the upright and missed so the score remained 4 - 0 with fifteen minutes of the first half remaining. Nine minutes later, Manly-Warringah were again on the attack and from ten metres out, moved the ball through the hands to the left wing where Michael Robertson dived over in the corner. The video referee was again called upon to examine the try, which was ruled to have been successfully scored just as Robertson's feet were being dragged onto the sideline by a defender. Orford's difficult kick went wide, so Manly's lead remained at 8-0 with under five minutes of the half remaining which were played out with no further points scored.

=== Second half ===
In the forty-seventh minute, The Manly side were within twenty metres of Melbourne's try-line when Matt Orford at first receiver put a grubber kick into the left corner which bounced up perfectly for Michael Robertson racing through on the wing to grab and dive over for his second try. Kicking duty was handed to Steve Matai who coolly converted Robertson's try from next to the sideline, bringing his side's lead to 14 - 0. Three minutes later, and from a similar attacking position, Manly-Warringah kept the ball alive, a pass from Brett Stewart fifteen metres out arriving at the feet of Steve Matai who, with only one defender before him, picked it up and passed to Michael Robertson to dive over again in the same corner. Matai's second sideline conversion attempt missed, so Manly were leading 18 - 0. In the fifty-seventh minute Manly-Warringah were again down in Melbourne's half and on the last tackle decided to run the ball, which was kept alive and passed through seven sets of hands before going to a charging Brent Kite who stretched out of the tackle and slammed the ball down under the posts. Matai kicked the easy conversion and it was Manly 24, Melbourne 0. Ten minutes later the Manly side got another try when, from within Melbourne's ten-metre line, they moved the ball out to David Williams on the right wing to dive over in the corner. The conversion attempt by Matai went wide so Manly were leading 28-0. In the seventy-second minute the Manly side ran the ball down toward the left corner with Robertson passing back in to Steve Menzies, who was playing in his 349th and final NRL match to crash over for a try, his 180th. Jamie Lyon took over the goal kicking and converted Menzies' try to give Manly a 34 - 0 lead. However, the finale was to come at the seventy-five-minute mark when from their forty-metre line, Manly second rower Glenn Hall burst into open space, passing back inside for Brett Stewart who was running through in support. Stewart was chased down just short of the try-line by Storm halfback Cooper Cronk, but he managed to flick the ball back without looking into the arms of Steven Bell to also get a try in his last game at the club. Jamie Lyon's simple conversion put the final score at 40 -0.

It was at the time the fourth-biggest loss in the Melbourne club's history.

The Manly Warringah Sea Eagles defeated the Melbourne Storm 40-0, scoring eight tries, four of which were converted. This is the highest Rugby League Grand Final margin in Australian history, eclipsing the 1975 NSWRFL season's Grand Final where Eastern Suburbs defeated St. George, 38–0 at the Sydney Cricket Ground. It is also the first time that a team has been kept scoreless in a Grand Final since the 1978 NSWRL Grand Final Replay, where Cronulla lost to Manly 16–0. Manly forward Brent Kite was named man-of-the-match and received the Clive Churchill Medal.

The 2008 Grand Final was the last match for Super League-bound Steve Menzies of Manly. Playing in this match brought his career games played to 349, equalling the current record from Terry Lamb.

== Match summary ==
2008 NRL Grand Final

Sunday, 5 October
17:15 AEDT (UTC+11)

Manly Warringah Sea Eagles	40 – 0	Melbourne Storm
Tries: 8 Robertson 33', 47', 55'; Ballin 23'; Kite 58'; Williams 67'; Menzies 73'; Bell 75'; Goals: 4 Matai 47', 58' (2/4); Lyon 73', 77' (2/2); Orford (0/2)	1st: 8–0; 2nd: 32–0; Report

ANZ Stadium, Sydney
Attendance: 80,388
Referee: Tony Archer
Touch judges: Steve Chiddy, Jeff Younis
Clive Churchill Medal: Brent Kite (Manly)

=== Statistics ===
	Manly Sea Eagles	Melbourne Storm
Tackles	279	319
Linebreaks	8	2
Hitups	78	65
Offloads	8	6
Missed Tackles	44	34
Errors	9	11
Dummy-Half Runs	17	20
Kicks in Play	22	18
Metres Gained	1610	1148
Shots at Goal	4/8	0/0
Scrums	8	5
Penalties	5	4
Possession	63%	37%

== See also ==
- 2009 World Club Challenge
