= Brett Stewart =

Australia international rugby league footballer

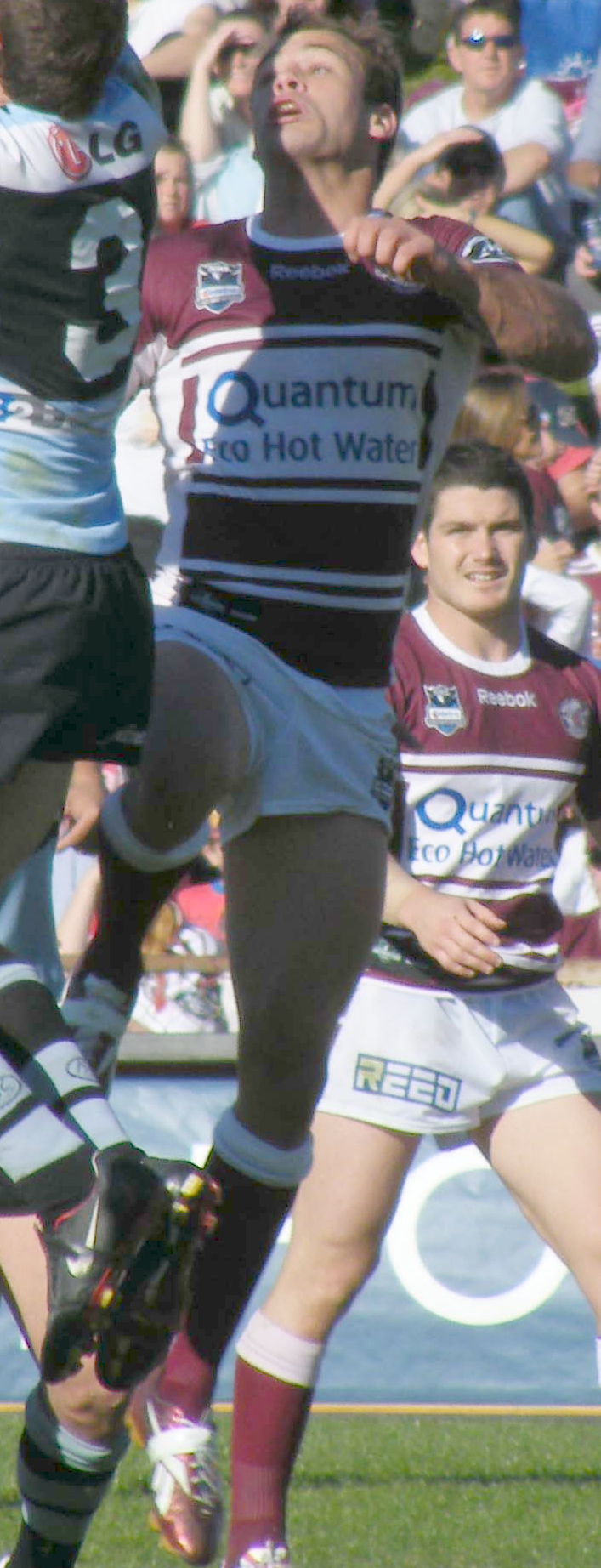

Personal information
- Born: 27 February 1985 (age 41) Wollongong, New South Wales, Australia

Playing information
- Height: 184 cm (6 ft 0 in)
- Weight: 92 kg (14 st 7 lb)
- Position: Fullback
Club
Years	Team	Pld	T	G	FG	P
2003–16	Manly Sea Eagles	233	166	0	0	664
Representative
Years	Team	Pld	T	G	FG	P
2005	Prime Minister's XIII	1	1	0	0	4
2007	NSW Country	1	0	0	0	0
2007–12	New South Wales	8	5	0	0	20
2007	Australia	1	1	0	0	4
- Relatives: Glenn Stewart (brother)

Brett Stewart (born 27 February 1985) is an Australian former professional rugby league footballer who played fullback for the Manly-Warringah Sea Eagles in the National Rugby League (NRL). An Australian international and New South Wales State of Origin representative fullback, he played his entire NRL career for the Sea Eagles, with whom he won the 2008 and 2011 Premierships.

== Background ==
Stewart was born and raised in Wollongong, New South Wales, Australia.

== Playing career ==
Brett and his older brother Glenn Stewart played their junior football for the Western Suburbs Red Devils, the same Illawarra Rugby League club that produced Manly-Warringah legend and rugby league Immortal Bob Fulton.

=== 2000s ===
Brett Stewart made his NRL debut for Manly on 6 July 2003 in round 17 of the 2003 NRL season as a replacement for injured fullback Brendon Reeves. In his only first grade game of the season, Manly were defeated 24-16 by the Parramatta Eels at Brookvale Oval.

After playing from the bench in a 30–22 loss to the Wests Tigers at Leichhardt Oval in Round 7 of the 2004 NRL season, rookie coach and dual Manly premiership player Des Hasler moved former dual international Andrew Walker from fullback to five-eighth to bring Stewart in as the Sea Eagles fullback in Round 9 against the St. George Illawarra Dragons at Brookvale Oval.

Stewart was second on the top try scorer list with 21 tries for the 2006 NRL season, one behind the South Sydney Rabbitohs' winger Nathan Merritt. In his first representative match playing for the Prime Minister's XIII against Papua New Guinea, he contributed to Australia's 28–8 win with a try. He made his State of Origin debut in Game 2 of the 2007 series, replacing injured Anthony Minichiello at late notice, and scored a try. Stewart played in the 2007 NRL Grand Final for Manly against the Melbourne Storm, and was knocked out while contesting a bomb with Storm forward Michael Crocker in the early minutes of the 2nd half. Stewart was selected as fullback for Australia's end of season test against New Zealand in Wellington, and contributed with a try in Australia's record 58–0 victory over the Kiwis.

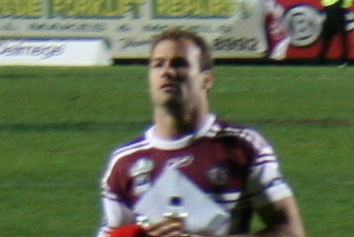
Stewart playing for the Sea Eagles in 2008

After being overlooked for the Centenary Test against the Kiwis at the Sydney Cricket Ground in favour of Storm and Queensland fullback Billy Slater, and again representing NSW in the 2008 State of Origin series, Stewart was one of the form players for Manly in their run to the 2008 NRL Grand Final, and was the NRL's leading try scorer of the season with 22 tries from 24 appearances. In the Grand Final, Manly faced Melbourne for the second year running. 2008 would be very different from the previous season, however, as the Sea Eagles recorded the largest ever GF win of 40–0. While Stewart did not cross for a try in the GF, he provided the last pass on a couple of occasions for teammates to score, including the last try of the game for departing Centre, Steven Bell.

In August 2008, Stewart was named in the preliminary 46-man Kangaroos squad for the 2008 Rugby League World Cup, and in October 2008 he was selected in the final 24-man Australia squad alongside other Manly players Brent Kite, Josh Perry, Anthony Watmough, David Williams, and his brother Glenn. Unfortunately however, Stewart was forced to withdraw with a shoulder injury before the competition had begun.

Stewart travelled with Manly-Warringah to England to face the Super League champions Leeds for the 2009 World Club Challenge at the Elland Road stadium in Leeds. Manly showed their class with a 28–20 win over Leeds, with both Stewart and Anthony Watmough crossing for two tries. In the lead-up to the WCC, Manly became the first Australian side travelling to England to actually play a warm-up game, defeating the Harlequins RL at The Stoop in London, winning 34–26.

Stewart featured in the NRL's 2009 television advertising campaign, alongside Storm player Greg Inglis as the "faces of rugby league". The campaign was launched in The Domain with Stewart declaring the start of the 101st season of rugby league in Australia.

Legal issues then saw Stewart suspended from the opening four rounds of the 2009 NRL season. Without Stewart at fullback, Manly opened their premiership defence with four straight losses. The rot stopped when Stewart returned in Round 5 against the Wests Tigers at Brookvale, scoring 3 tries as Manly won 23–10. He scored another two at Brookvale the next week against South Sydney before a knee injury forced him to miss the next 19 games. He made his return in Round 25 against Cronulla.

In 2011, Stewart won his second premiership as Manly defeated New Zealand 24–10 in the 2011 NRL Grand Final with Stewart scoring a try in the match. In 2013, Manly made the grand final again and Stewart played at fullback in their 26–18 defeat by the Sydney Roosters.

Recurring injuries forced Stewart to retire in the pre-season of 2017, finishing his career as the 6th highest try scorer in NRL history.

=== Suspensions ===
Stewart was charged with sexual assault on 10 March 2009. The NRL said it was "making no judgement" and announced it would suspend the 2009 commercial which featured Stewart until further information became available. Despite the Manly board's decision to select Stewart for round one of the 2009 season, the NRL on 11 March suspended Stewart for the first four rounds for drunkenness, reportedly stating that "its decision to stop Stewart playing was not intended to reflect any judgment regarding the police investigation into the alleged assault."

=== Career highlights ===
- Junior Club: Wests (Wollongong)
- First Grade Debut: Manly v Parramatta Eels at Parramatta Stadium, 6 July 2003 (Rd 17) (Parra 27 d Manly 16)
- State of Origin Debut: NSW vs Queensland at Telstra Stadium, 13 June 2007 (Qld 10 d NSW 6 – 1 try)
- Test Debut: Australia vs New Zealand at Westpac Stadium (Wellington, NZ), 21 October 2007 (Aus 58 d NZ 0 – 1 try). This would be Stewart's only test appearance, though he was selected to Australia's 2008 World Cup and 2011 Four Nations squads before withdrawing due to injury.
- First Grade Record (2003–2016): 223 National Rugby League games, scoring 163 tries for a career strike rate of 73.09%.
- First Try: Manly vs New Zealand Warriors at Ericsson Stadium (Auckland, NZ), 16 May 2004 (Rd 10) (Manly 42 d NZ 20)
- Last Try: Manly vs Cronulla-Sutherland Sharks at Brookvale Oval, 21 May 2016 (Rd 3) (Manly 22 d Cronulla 12)
- Top Try Scorer for the 2008 NRL Season. Stewart missed three games due to Origin duty but still finished atop the try scoring list with 19 tries from 21 games. He would score another 3 tries in the Finals series to equal the record for most tries in a season by a fullback (22) set by Brett Mullins of the Canberra Raiders in 1994.
- In round 2 of the 2011 NRL season, Brett Stewart captained the Manly Warringah Sea Eagles for the first time.

== Personal life ==
Stewart is the younger brother of former Manly Warringah Sea Eagles and now retired player Glenn Stewart. He was diagnosed with type 1 diabetes at age 14 and is active in promoting diabetes awareness in children and how people who have it can still lead an active life.

Following his injury forced retirement from playing in 2016 (though he was still a contracted Manly player in 2017), Stewart divides his time between his home in Sydney and the Toko Japanese restaurant (of which he is a 1/3 part owner) in Melbourne.

On 8 April 2023, Stewart was arrested by NSW Police and charged with cocaine possession after being stopped on Sydney's Northern Beaches. Stewart was ordered to Manly local court on 19 April 2023.

== Legal Investigation ==
He was accused of assaulting a 17-year-old girl following the Manly Warringah Sea Eagles' season launch on 6 March 2009. Stewart denied the allegation and was granted bail to appear in Manly Local Court on 7 April.

Stewart was charged with sexual assault on 10 March 2009. On 7 April 2009, Stewart entered a plea of not guilty to the charges at Manly Local Court and the matter was adjourned until 26 May, on which date Stewart's case was again mentioned in court, although Stewart was not present. The case was further adjourned to 23 June as his lawyer stated that he was still waiting on documents.

When the court reconvened on 23 June 2009, his lawyers requested access to further documents, including psychiatric evaluations, and the matter was adjourned until September. The court met once again on 28 September, and there they found that Stewart had a case to answer. As a result, he was ordered to attend a committal hearing in February 2010.

The committal hearing commenced on 4 February 2010, at Sydney's Downing Centre Local Court. Stewart was represented by Clive Steirn, with Deputy Chief Magistrate Paul Cloran presiding. He was accompanied by a number of supporters, including his ex-girlfriend Jamie Baker, family members, and Manly coach Des Hasler. His charges are sexual intercourse without consent, involving digital penetration, and assault with an act of indecency.

Stewart continued to strongly deny the allegations, with the hearing temporarily adjourned for one hour while Cloran read evidential documentation. The tendered documentation included medical evidence, psychiatric reports, and statements from the alleged victim and her family. The alleged victim's former psychiatrist gave evidence for the hearing, these details were suppressed by Cloran.

The hearing was adjourned until 22 March 2010, in order for the alleged victim's father to give evidence, as he was overseas.

=== Acquittal ===
On 22 March 2010, Deputy Chief Magistrate Paul Cloran determined that there was enough evidence for the case to proceed to trial. His trial commenced on Monday 13 September 2010 and concluded on 29 September 2010 with a jury who deliberated for 50 minutes to return a verdict of not guilty.

At the opening and closing of his trial, jurors were told by the judge that Stewart deserves the presumption of innocence despite the high number of sexual assault cases involving high-profile players that have received media attention in Australia in recent years.

On 16 June 2012 The Sydney Morning Herald and Age newspapers published a lengthy investigation by journalist Mark Whittaker asserting that the father of the alleged victim had a long history of fraud. The "victim's" sister was quoted saying, "I'm not a footy fan but I felt for Brett Stewart because I felt, 'My father's tearing another innocent person's life apart.' He sees money signs around Brett. A perfect target ... My father just screws everyone's life that walks past him. It's terrible."
