= 2008 RLIF Awards =

The 2008 RLIF Awards were presented on Monday 17 November 2008 at Suncorp Stadium, Brisbane, Australia recognising achievements in the sport of rugby league from October 2007 to October 2008 (including the NRL and Super League Grand Finals).

The 2008 RLIF Awards were marked by inaugural awards ceremony and featured new awards, notably the Rugby League International Federation Player of the Year Award. Other new awards included the Rookie of Year, for players who made their Test debut and were under 21 years of age in the awards year, the Nations' International Players of the Year, selected by each nation's governing body from the 19 teams that competed to qualify for the 2008 RLWC and the Spirit of Rugby League, for those who have made significant contributions to the sport in their lifetime.

== Awards ==
For awards presented with nominees, winners are listed first and highlighted in boldface.

International Player of the Year	Coach of the Year
**Billy Slater, Melbourne Storm, Queensland Maroons, Australia**; Cameron Smith, Melbourne Storm, Queensland Maroons, Australia; Greg Inglis, Melbourne Storm, Queensland Maroons, Australia; Matt Orford, Manly Sea Eagles, Australia; James Graham, St Helens R.F.C., England; Leon Pryce, St Helens R.F.C., England; Jamie Peacock, Leeds Rhinos, England; Rob Burrow, Leeds Rhinos, England	**Des Hasler, Manly Sea Eagles**; Ricky Stuart, Cronulla Sharks, Australia; Neil Henry, Canberra Raiders; Craig Bellamy, Melbourne Storm, New South Wales Blues; Daniel Anderson, St Helens R.F.C.; Brian McClennan, Leeds Rhinos; Brian Noble, Wigan Warriors; Mick Potter, Catalans Dragons
Referee of the Year	Rookie of the Year
**Tony Archer, Australia**	**Israel Folau, Melbourne Storm, Queensland Maroons, Australia**
Team of the Year	Nations' Player of the Year
**Fullback - Billy Slater**, Melbourne Storm, Queensland Maroons, Australia; **Winger - Manu Vatuvei**, New Zealand Warriors, New Zealand; **Centre - Israel Folau**, Melbourne Storm, Queensland Maroons, Australia; **Five-eighth - Greg Inglis**, Melbourne Storm, Queensland Maroons, Australia; **Halfback - Scott Prince**, Gold Coast Titans, Queensland Maroons, Australia; **Lock - Paul Gallen**, Cronulla Sharks, New South Wales Blues, Australia; **Second Row** (tied vote); - **Gareth Ellis**, Leeds Rhinos, England; - **Anthony Laffranchi**, Gold Coast Titans, New South Wales Blues, Australia; **Front Row - James Graham**, St Helens R.F.C., England; **Hooker - Cameron Smith**, Melbourne Storm, Queensland Maroons, Australia	**Lebanon - George Ndaira**; **Ireland - Damien Blanch**; **United States - Greg Stellutti**; **Tonga - Michael Jennings**; **Japan - Shunsuke Tamura**; **Samoa - Tony Puletua**; **Wales - Dave Halley**; **France - Christophe Moly**; **Russia - Roman Ovchinnikov**; **Scotland - Iain Morrison**; **Cook Islands - Adam Watene**; **Papua New Guinea - Paul Aiton**; **Serbia - Soni Radovanovic**; **Fiji - Ashton Sims**
Spirit of Rugby League Award
**Paul Barriere - France**
