= Michael Robertson (rugby league) =

Former Scotland international rugby league footballer

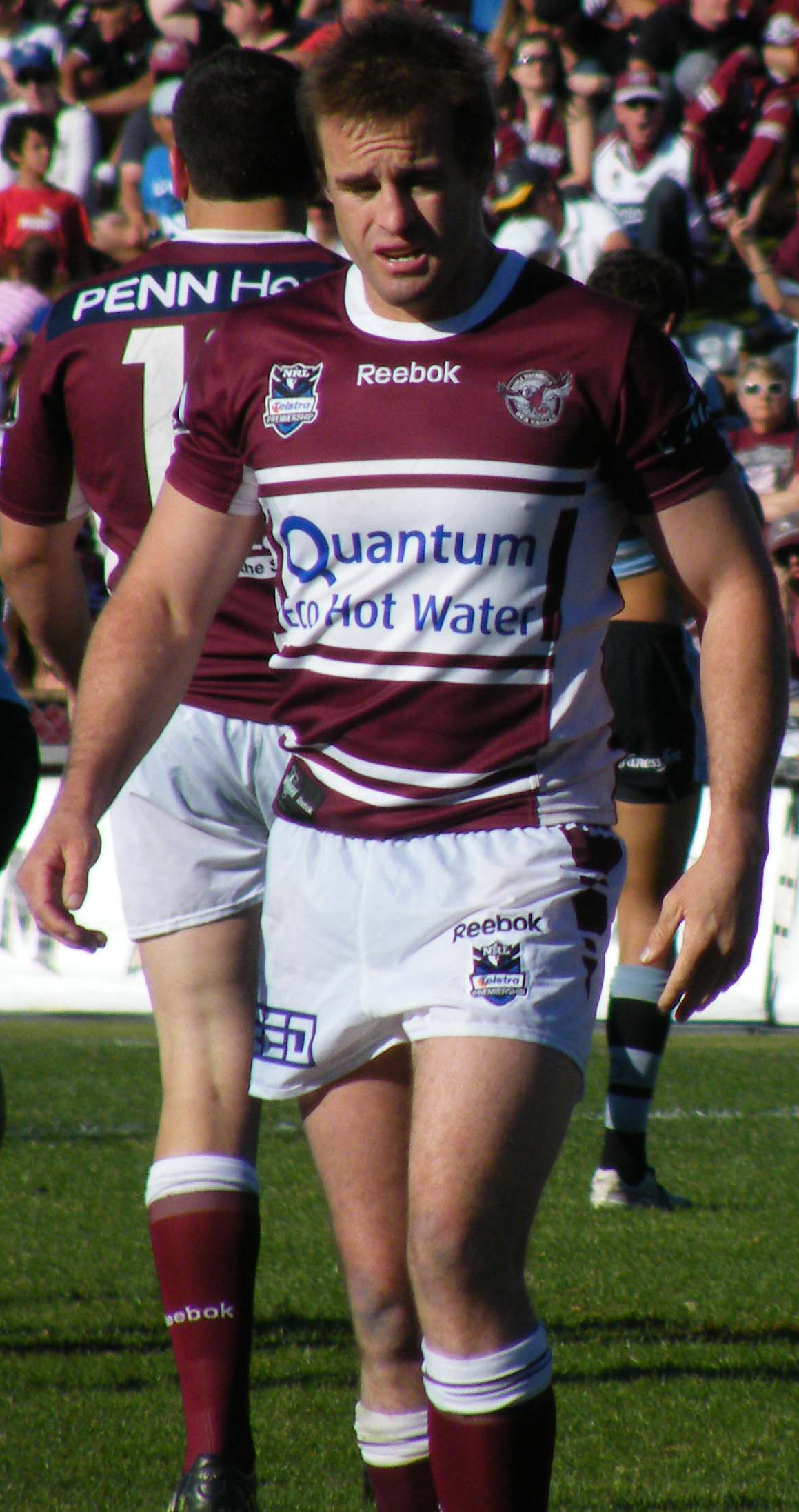

Personal information
- Full name: Michael Robertson
- Born: 14 April 1983 (age 43) Wellington, New South Wales, Australia

Playing information
- Height: 178 cm (5 ft 10 in)
- Weight: 88 kg (13 st 12 lb)
- Position: Wing, Fullback
Club
Years	Team	Pld	T	G	FG	P
2001–05	Canberra Raiders	59	15	0	0	60
2006–11	Manly Sea Eagles	150	68	2	0	276
2012–13	London Broncos	41	18	0	0	72
	Total	250	101	2	0	408
Representative
Years	Team	Pld	T	G	FG	P
2008	Scotland	3	1	0	0	4
2010	Country Origin	1	1	0	0	4

Michael Robertson (born 14 April 1983) is a former Scotland international rugby league footballer. His usual position was on the wing but he could also play as a fullback with equal ability. He played for the London Broncos in the Super League, and the Canberra Raiders and Manly-Warringah Sea Eagles in the NRL. He was considered a player with natural pace and try scoring ability.

== Background ==
Robertson was born in Wellington, New South Wales, Australia.

== Playing career ==
Robertson played junior football with Valley Dragons in the ACT, and was graded to the Canberra Raiders, making his first-grade début in 2001 against the North Queensland Cowboys.

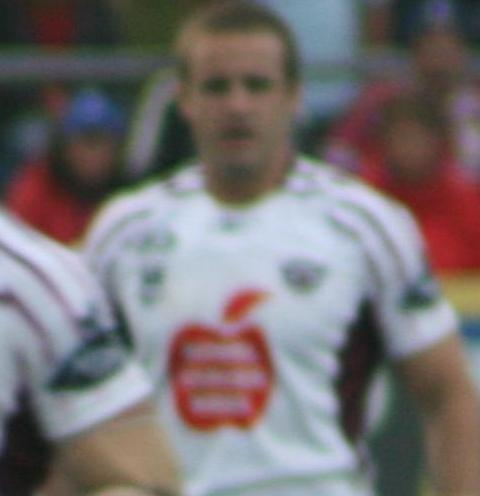
Robertson in action for the Sea Eagles

After signing to play for the Manly-Warringah Sea Eagles from the start of the 2006 NRL season, Robertson cemented his spot on the left win for Manly and played in the 2007 NRL grand final defeat by the Melbourne Storm.

He scored three tries in the Manly club's record breaking 40-0 2008 NRL Grand Final victory over Melbourne, becoming the first player to score three tries in an Australian Grand Final since Steve Renouf did so for the Brisbane Broncos in the 1997 Super League Grand Final. He would then go on to play in Manly's 28–20 win over English Super League champions the Leeds Rhinos in the 2009 World Club Challenge played at Elland Road in Leeds.

Normally a left side winger, suspension and injuries to Brett Stewart saw Robertson play most of the 2009 NRL season at fullback for the Sea Eagles. When Stewart suffered a season ending knee injury in Round 1 of the 2010 season against the Wests Tigers, it was expected that coach Des Hasler would move Robertson to fullback for the season. However, the pre-season signing of former North Queensland Cowboys utility back Ben Farrar allowed Hasler to keep Robbo in his referred wing position and play Farrar at fullback.

After débuting for the Manly club in round 2, 2006 Robertson played in 139 consecutive club games until suffering a knee injury in a two try performance against the Gold Coast Titans in round 10 of the 2011 season. The injury was expected to keep Robertson out only for a single game, but he ended up missing three games. He returned to the club in Manly's 22–18 win over Parramatta at Brookvale Oval

Towards the end of the 2011 NRL home and away season, Robertson announced that he would be leaving Manly after six years with the club. Robertson would fulfill a long-held ambition to play in England when he would join the Super League club the London Broncos in 2012. Until then Robertson had vowed he would take his place on the wing with Manly in a bid to win his second NRL premiership with Manly-Warringah, which they achieved by taking out the 2011 NRL Grand Final over the New Zealand Warriors 24–10.

Robertson's last play for Manly-Warringah was a goal kick after the final siren of the 2011 Grand Final converting captain Jamie Lyon's try giving the departing winger a perfect 2/2 goal kicking record in the NRL (having also kicked a goal in Manly's 42–8 win over North Queensland 3 weeks earlier in the Qualifying Final) to go along with his 83 tries from 209 first grade appearances for Canberra and Manly.

== Super League ==
Robertson made his first appearance on the wing for the London Broncos on 14 February 2012. He scored a try on début in a 24–34 loss to St. Helens at the Stoop Stadium in London. Robertson signed a 2-year deal midway through the 2012 season. In total, Robertson made 41 appearances for London scoring 18 tries.

== Representative career ==
Due to his Scottish heritage, Robertson made himself available for Scotland's 2008 Rugby League World Cup campaign. Robertson was named in the Scotland squad for the World Cup and played all three of their games at fullback, scoring a try in the team's 18–16 win over Fiji at Bluetongue Stadium in Gosford.

Robertson's good form to start the 2010 NRL season scoring 7 tries in 8 games in his preferred position of wing was rewarded with selection for Country Origin in the annual City vs Country Origin match in Port Macquarie. Robertson, who is normally a left winger for the Sea Eagles, played on the right wing and scored a try in Country's 36–18 win over City.
