= Russell Aitken =

Australian rugby league coach & former rugby league footballer

Russ Aitken
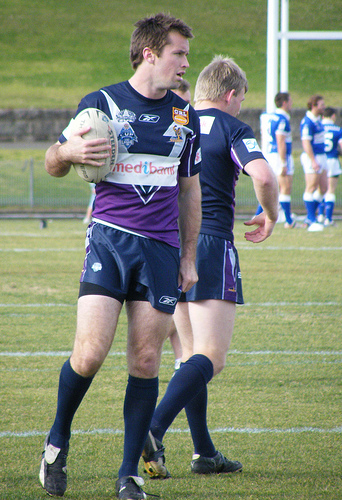

Personal information
- Full name: Russell Aitken
- Born: 19 May 1985 (age 40) Sutherland, New South Wales, Australia

Playing information
- Height: 185 cm (6 ft 1 in)
- Weight: 91 kg (14 st 5 lb)
- Position: Five-eighth, Halfback, Hooker
Club
Years	Team	Pld	T	G	FG	P
2003–05	Cronulla Sharks	7	2	0	0	8
2007–08	Melbourne Storm	10	1	0	0	4
2009	Gateshead Thunder	11	5	0	0	20
2011–14	AS Carcassonne	63	16	0	0	64
	Total	91	24	0	0	96

Coaching information
Club
Years	Team	Gms	W	D	L	W%
	Helensburgh Tigers

Russell Aitken (born 19 May 1985) is an Australian former professional rugby league footballer. Aitken is currently the head coach of St. George Illawarra Dragons NSW Cup Side. Aitken formerly coached the Helensburgh Tigers who competed in the Sydney Shield Competition, in the 2020 season. Aitken most recently played professionally with the AS Carcassonne rugby league club in France.

== Early life ==
Aiken was educated at Cronulla High School in Sydney, where he represented 2002 Australian Schoolboys.

== Playing career ==
After brief stints with Cronulla and North Queensland, Aitken signed for the Melbourne Storm at the beginning of the 2007 NRL season. Aitken made his début for the Melbourne club against St. George Illawarra in round 5 at the start of the 2007 season, coming off the bench as an interchange player.

Following Cameron Smith's controversial suspension after Melbourne's semi-final victory against the Brisbane Broncos, Aitken was selected at hooker to play in the 2008 NRL Grand Final after only a handful of first grade appearances.

Melbourne went on to lose the grand final by a record-breaking margin of 40-0 after having achieved the rare feat of making three consecutive grand finals. During the subsequent off-season, Aitken was released by the Melbourne side and chose to continue his Rugby League career with French club AS Carcassonne.

Aitken joined Co-operative European Championship team, Gateshead Thunder, in the summer of 2009.

In late 2009, Gateshead Thunder went into administration, Aitken returned to Australia in early 2010 and played for the Newtown Jets in 2010.

After a stint in the Illawarra Carlton League with the Helensburgh Tigers in 2011, Aitken once more returned to play in France with his former club AS Carcassonne for the 2011/12, 12/13 and 13/14 seasons.

It was during the 2011/12 season that Aitken was involved in an historic 'Double Championship' winning season for the 'Canaris'. They overcame their much fancied opponents, the Pia Donkeys, in both the Elite 1 Championship Final and Lord Derby Cup Final over successive weekends.

In May 2014, Aitken was appointed the Captain/ Coach of the Campbelltown City Kangaroos in the Group 6 Rugby League competition for the period of June 2014 – September 2014. Aitken has since coached at Central Queensland Capras in the QLD Cup, lower grades at the Cronulla-Sutherland Sharks and most recently at the Helensburgh Tigers in the Illawarra Carlton League.
