= Clive Churchill Medal =

Australian rugby league medal

- League: National Rugby League
- Awarded for: The man-of-the-match in the NRL Grand Final

History
- First award: 1986 (contemporary); 1954 (retrospective)
- First winner: Peter Sterling (contemporary); Clive Churchill (retrospective)
- Most wins: Norm Provan (3)
- Most recent: James Tedesco (2026)

The Clive Churchill Medal is the award given to the player judged to be man-of-the-match in the National Rugby League's annual Grand Final. The award was created to honour Clive Churchill following his death in 1985. Churchill is considered one of the greatest and most decorated players in Australian rugby league history. One of the highest individual player honours in the NRL, the medal's recipient is chosen by the selectors of the Australian national team. It is announced at the post-grand final ceremony, and awarded by a previous winner. The current recipient of the award is James Tedesco of the Sydney Roosters.

The Clive Churchill Medal has been awarded since the 1986 NSWRL season when its first recipient was Peter Sterling. It was initially presented in a case until 2000 where it is presented separately with a ribbon being worn around the neck. The only three players to have won the award more than once are Bradley Clyde (1989 and 1991), Billy Slater (2009 and 2017) and Nathan Cleary (2021 and 2023) . Despite the Melbourne Storm being stripped of their 2007 and 2009 premiership titles due to salary cap breaches in 2010, the medal winners of those years remain officially recognised.

The medal has only been awarded to a member of the losing grand final team on four occasions. Clyde in 1991, Brad Mackay in 1993, Daly Cherry-Evans in 2013, and Jack Wighton in 2019.

== List of recipients ==
Table key
^	Player was member of losing team

Table of recipients
Year	Recipient	Team	Position	Ref
1986	Peter Sterling	Parramatta Eels	Halfback	
1987	Cliff Lyons	Manly-Warringah Sea Eagles	Five-eighth	
1988	Paul Dunn	Canterbury-Bankstown Bulldogs	Prop	
1989	Bradley Clyde (1)	Canberra Raiders	Lock	
1990	Ricky Stuart	Canberra Raiders	Halfback	
1991	Bradley Clyde^ (2)	Canberra Raiders	Lock	
1992	Allan Langer	Brisbane Broncos	Halfback	
1993	Brad Mackay^	St George Dragons	Lock	
1994	David Furner	Canberra Raiders	Second-row	
1995	Jim Dymock	Sydney Bulldogs	Lock	
1996	Geoff Toovey	Manly-Warringah Sea Eagles	Halfback	
1997	Robbie O'Davis	Newcastle Knights	Fullback	
1998	Gorden Tallis	Brisbane Broncos	Second-row	
1999	Brett Kimmorley	Melbourne Storm	Halfback	
2000	Darren Lockyer	Brisbane Broncos	Fullback	
2001	Andrew Johns	Newcastle Knights	Halfback	
2002	Craig Fitzgibbon	Sydney Roosters	Second-row	
2003	Luke Priddis	Penrith Panthers	Hooker	
2004	Willie Mason	Bulldogs	Prop	
2005	Scott Prince	Wests Tigers	Halfback	
2006	Shaun Berrigan	Brisbane Broncos	Hooker	
2007	Greg Inglis	Melbourne Storm	Five-eighth	
2008	Brent Kite	Manly-Warringah Sea Eagles	Prop	
2009	Billy Slater (1)	Melbourne Storm	Fullback	
2010	Darius Boyd	St. George Illawarra Dragons	Fullback	
2011	Glenn Stewart	Manly-Warringah Sea Eagles	Lock	
2012	Cooper Cronk	Melbourne Storm	Halfback	
2013	Daly Cherry-Evans^	Manly-Warringah Sea Eagles	Halfback	
2014	Sam Burgess	South Sydney Rabbitohs	Lock	
2015	Johnathan Thurston	North Queensland Cowboys	Halfback	
2016	Luke Lewis	Cronulla-Sutherland Sharks	Second-row	
2017	Billy Slater (2)	Melbourne Storm	Fullback	
2018	Luke Keary	Sydney Roosters	Five-eighth	
2019	Jack Wighton^	Canberra Raiders	Five-eighth	
2020	Ryan Papenhuyzen	Melbourne Storm	Fullback	
2021	Nathan Cleary	Penrith Panthers	Halfback	
2022	Dylan Edwards	Penrith Panthers	Fullback	
2023	Nathan Cleary (2)	Penrith Panthers	Halfback	
2024	Liam Martin	Penrith Panthers	Second-row	
2025	Reece Walsh	Brisbane Broncos	Fullback	
2026	James Tedesco	Sydney Roosters	Fullback	

=== Retrospective awards ===
As part of the Centenary of League celebrations in 2008, the Clive Churchill Medal has been retrospectively awarded for man-of-the-match performances from season 1954, the first to feature mandatory grand finals. The first recipient from the 1954 season is the man for which the award was originally named, Clive Churchill.

Despite claims to the contrary at the time of the announcement of the retrospective medals that there had not been Man Of The Match awards for Grand Finals prior to 1986, this was not the case - there had been the Dave Brown Medal awarded at some stage, and, according to the NSWRL's official match day program, a new prize was awarded in 1971, with the winner named by reporters covering the game (the first was won by South Sydney's Ron Coote). In 1972 the award went to Manly half back Dennis Ward, and the following year, to Manly's Bob Fulton. In 1974, Arthur Beetson won the press writers award, and in 1975 it was Ian Schubert. The retrospective Clive Churchill Medals - either by coincidence or design - reflect those award winners.

In the replayed grand finals of 1977 and 1978, the award was based on efforts over the course of both games, although Manly-Warringah's Graham Eadie was a clear choice in 1978 after a dominating performance from fullback in the Grand Final replay.

Table key
^	Player was member of losing team

Table of recipients
Year	Recipient	Team	Position
1954	Clive Churchill	South Sydney Rabbitohs	Fullback
1955	Jack Rayner	South Sydney Rabbitohs	Second row
1956	Kevin Brown	St George Dragons	Prop
1957	Norm Provan (1)	St George Dragons	Second row
1958	Norm Provan (2)	St George Dragons	Second row
1959	Peter Provan	St George Dragons	Lock
1960	Monty Porter	St George Dragons	Second row
1961	Brian Clay	St George Dragons	Five-eighth
1962	Ian Walsh	St George Dragons	Hooker
1963	Norm Provan (3)	St George Dragons	Second row
1964	Graeme Langlands	St George Dragons	Fullback
1965	Kevin Ryan	St George Dragons	Prop
1966	John Raper	St George Dragons	Lock
1967	Les Johns^	Canterbury-Bankstown	Fullback
1968	Eric Simms	South Sydney Rabbitohs	Fullback
1969	Dave Bolton	Balmain Tigers	Five-eighth
1970	Bob Grant	South Sydney Rabbitohs	Halfback
1971	Ron Coote	South Sydney Rabbitohs	Lock
1972	Dennis Ward	Manly-Warringah Sea Eagles	Halfback
1973	Bob Fulton	Manly-Warringah Sea Eagles	Centre
1974	Arthur Beetson	Eastern Suburbs Roosters	Prop
1975	Ian Schubert	Eastern Suburbs Roosters	Fullback
1976	Graham Eadie (1)	Manly-Warringah Sea Eagles	Fullback
1977	Craig Young	St George Dragons	Prop
1978	Graham Eadie (2)	Manly-Warringah Sea Eagles	Fullback
1979	Steve Morris	St George Dragons	Halfback
1980	Steve Gearin	Canterbury-Bankstown Bulldogs	Wing
1981	Bob O'Reilly	Parramatta Eels	Prop
1982	Brett Kenny (1)	Parramatta Eels	Five-eighth
1983	Brett Kenny (2)	Parramatta Eels	Five-eighth
1984	Peter Kelly	Canterbury-Bankstown Bulldogs	Prop
1985	Steve Mortimer	Canterbury-Bankstown Bulldogs	Halfback

== Multiple winners ==
The following players have won the Clive Churchill Medal multiple times.

Medals	Player	Team	Seasons
3	Norm Provan	St George	1957*, 1958*, 1963*
2	Graham Eadie	Manly-Warringah	1976*, 1978*
2	Brett Kenny	Parramatta	1982*, 1983*
2	Bradley Clyde	Canberra	1989, 1991
2	Billy Slater	Melbourne	2009, 2017
2	Nathan Cleary	Penrith	2021, 2023

* Retrospective medals.

== See also ==
- Dally M Medal
- Rothmans Medal
- Harry Sunderland Trophy
- Norm Smith Medal
- Karyn Murphy Medal
