= Steve Menzies =

Australia international rugby league footballer

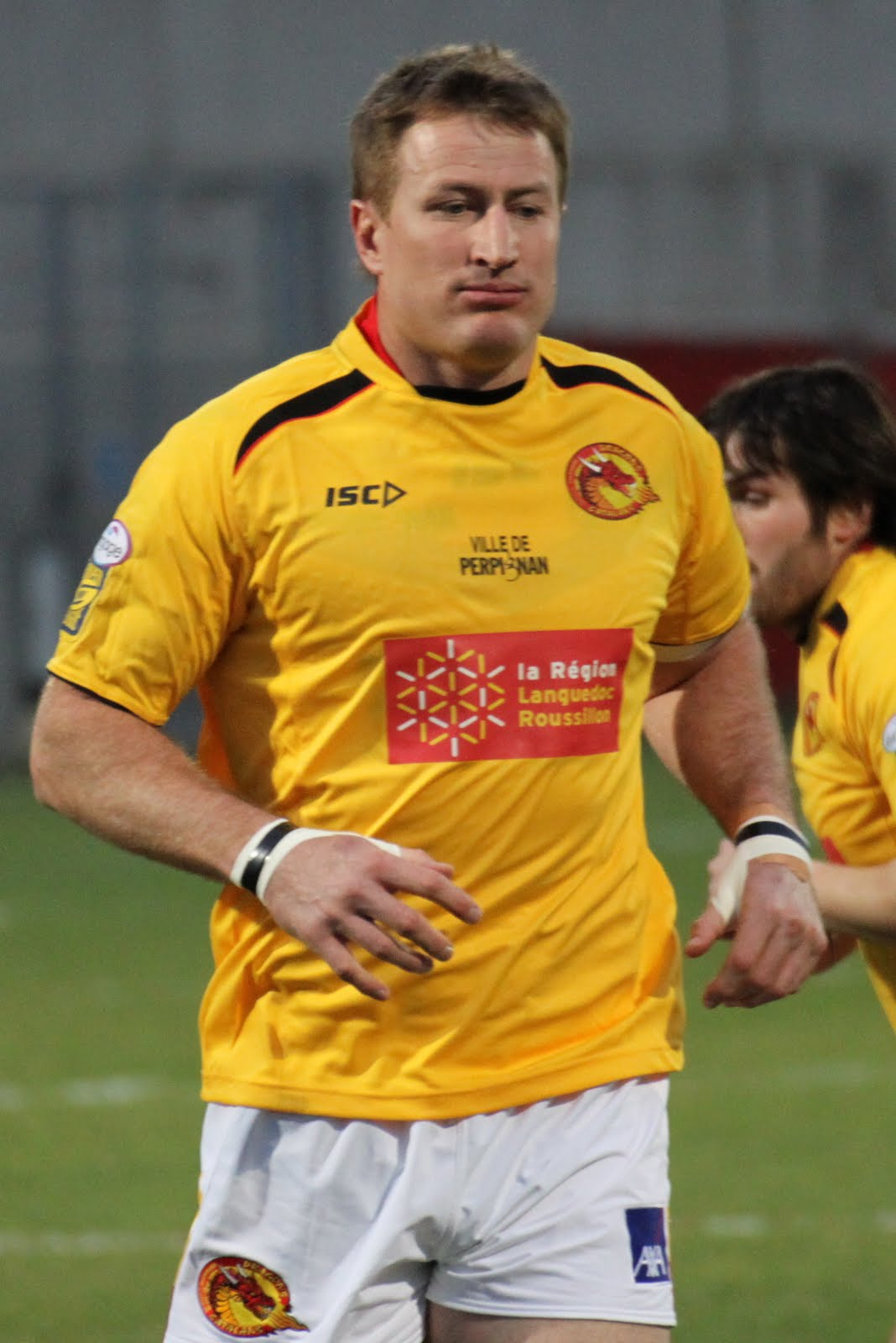

Personal information
- Full name: Steven Menzies
- Born: 4 December 1973 (age 52) Manly, New South Wales, Australia

Playing information
- Height: 190 cm (6 ft 3 in)
- Weight: 98 kg (15 st 6 lb)
- Position: Second-row, Lock, Centre, Five-eighth
Club
| Years | Team | Pld | T | G | FG | P |
|---|---|---|---|---|---|---|
| 1993–99 | Manly Sea Eagles | 150 | 104 | 0 | 0 | 416 |
| 2000–02 | Northern Eagles | 69 | 29 | 0 | 0 | 116 |
| 2003–08 | Manly Sea Eagles | 130 | 47 | 1 | 0 | 186 |
| 2009–10 | Bradford Bulls | 57 | 27 | 1 | 0 | 110 |
| 2011–13 | Catalans Dragons | 71 | 31 | 0 | 0 | 124 |
| | Total | 477 | 238 | 2 | 0 | 952 |
Representative
| Years | Team | Pld | T | G | FG | P |
| 1995–05 | NSW City Origin | 8 | 2 | 0 | 0 | 8 |
| 1995–06 | New South Wales | 20 | 4 | 0 | 0 | 16 |
| 1995–06 | Australia | 13 | 9 | 0 | 0 | 36 |
| 2012–13 | Exiles | 2 | 0 | 0 | 0 | 0 |

Steve Menzies (born 4 December 1973), commonly referred to by his nickname "Beaver", is an Australian former professional rugby league footballer best known for his career with the Manly-Warringah Sea Eagles. He also played for the Bradford Bulls and the Catalans Dragons in the Super League. Menzies spent the majority of his playing career in the second row, but he also played as a centre, five-eighth and as a utility player off the bench.

He joined the Bradford Bulls in the Super League from the 2009 season.

Menzies was a noted defender, but is best known as the most prolific try scoring forward in rugby league. His total of 180 tries is the fifth highest in Australian first grade rugby league history. In total, Menzies played 531 first grade, City Origin, State of Origin, Exiles, Australian tour games, and test matches, scoring 262 tries.

He is well known for wearing headgear during games, having done so throughout his entire career, as well as his loyalty to the Manly-Warringah Sea Eagles.

== Early life ==
Menzies was born in Manly, New South Wales, Australia.

Menzies is the grandson of Manly-Warringah pioneer Mackie Campbell who had played in the centres in Manly's first ever game in 1947 against Western Suburbs at Manly's long time home ground Brookvale Oval. While attending Narrabeen High School, Menzies played for the Australian Schoolboys team in 1992. His junior club was Harbord United. As a teenager he turned down an offer of $5,000 from Manly's local rivals the North Sydney Bears to later sign with Manly for $9,000 in 1993.

== Playing career ==
=== 1990s ===
Menzies made his first grade debut for the Manly Sea Eagles against the Brisbane Broncos in Round 13 1993 at Brookvale Oval. Menzies was a member of the Manly sides which won three consecutive minor premierships between 1995 and 1997 and also played in three consecutive grand finals between those years.

Menzies won his first premiership with Manly in 1996 as they defeated St George 20-8 in the decider which was played at the Sydney Football Stadium. Menzies scored a try in the match.

Menzies played for Manly until the end of 1999 and featured in what was then Manly's last game as a stand-alone entity when they played against St George in Round 26 1999. At the end of 1999, Manly controversially merged with arch rivals North Sydney as part of the competitions rationalisation strategy and became the Northern Eagles. Menzies finished as Manly's top try scorer in 1994, 1995, 1996, 1998 and 1999.

=== 2000s ===
Menzies continued into the early 2000s playing for the Northern Eagles and finished as the club's top try scorer in 2002. Menzies played in the Northern Eagles final ever game which was against Penrith in Round 26 2002 which the Northern Eagles lost 68-28 at Brookvale Oval. Menzies scored a try in the defeat. Following the conclusion of the 2002 NRL season, the Northern Eagles were dissolved and the licence was given back to Manly Sea Eagles.

In 2004 Steve Menzies surpassed rugby league and Glebe stalwart Frank Burge's record of 'Most Tries Scored by a second rower' when he scored his 147th try against St George Illawarra. Since then Menzies has gone on to amass a tally of 180 tries in 349 games, both club records at the Manly Sea Eagles.

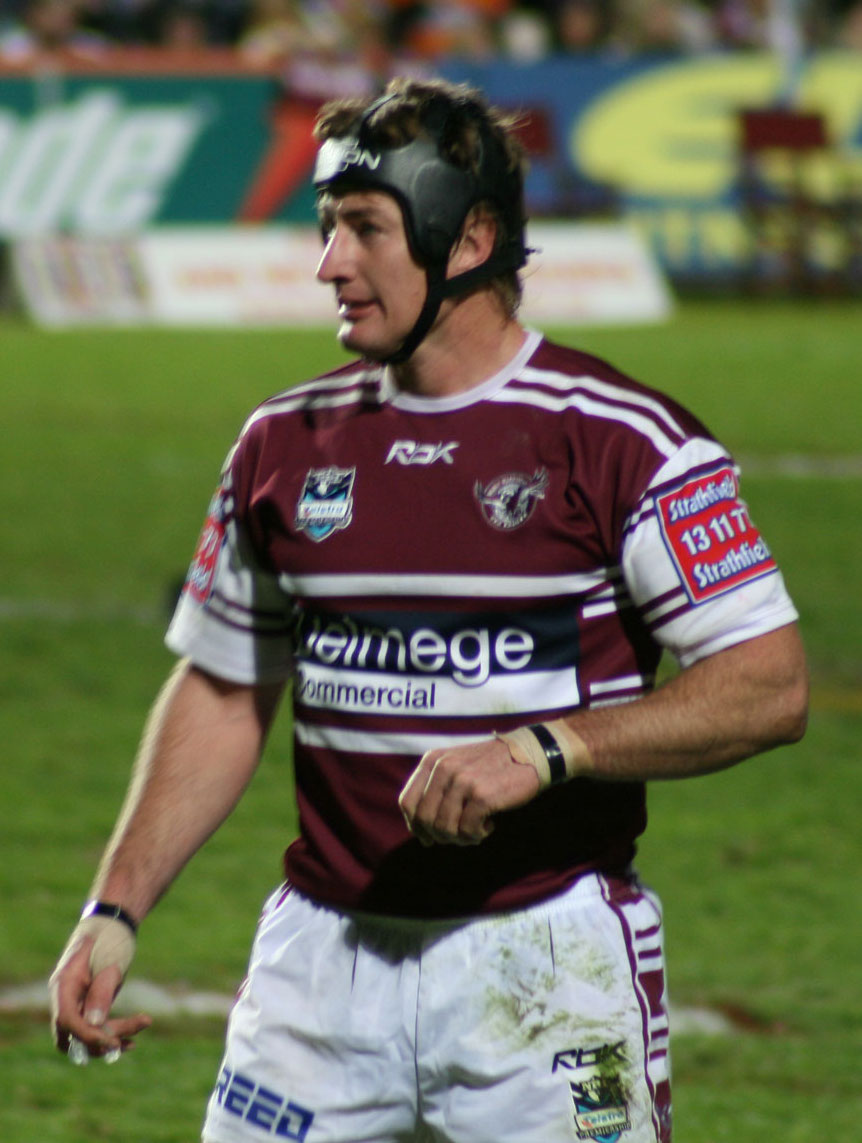
Menzies playing for the Sea Eagles in 2007

When Manly reached the Grand Final in 2007 Menzies was the sole surviving member of the club's last Grand Final appearance back in 1997. He started in his fourth Grand Final against the Melbourne Storm but the Manly side was unsuccessful in securing the premiership trophy.

After speculation on his retirement from rugby league, Menzies announced in October 2007 that he had re-signed with the Manly Sea Eagles for 2008 on a one-year contract, stating that he would likely retire at the conclusion of the 2008 season.

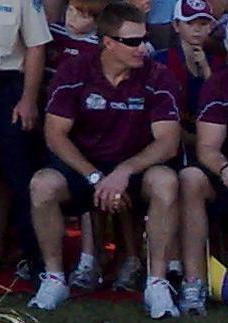
Menzies at the celebration of the winning of the 2008 NRL Grand Final

After a record-breaking club career with Manly and the Northern Eagles, Menzies had the opportunity to play in another Grand Final - again against Melbourne. Unlike 2007, Manly were the overwhelmingly dominant side, defeating the defending premiers 40-0 - a grand final record. By playing in the 2008 grand final, Menzies equalled Terry Lamb's record of 349 first-grade games. He was one of eight Manly try-scorers on the day and completed his playing-career in Australia with 180 tries - second only to Ken Irvine but first among try-scoring forwards. With less than ten minutes left on the clock, Menzies completed his fairytale by scoring a try with his first touch after coming off the bench for a second time, replacing the injured Steve Matai. His efforts in the Grand Final of 2008 will be entered in Northern Beaches and Rugby League folklore and have earned him legendary status, as well as the 'Performer of the Week' award from the Sydney Morning Herald. In anticipation of equalling Lamb's record with his final appearance, Manly was reported to have made Menzies an offer to make a cameo appearance in 2009 to break the record. Menzies' response confirmed his and Lamb's standing among the greats:

"I wouldn't consider coming back for one game and cheapening the record or anything," said Menzies.

"If I fell one short or equalled it or whatever then that's my career and the way it finishes.

"(Lamb) was such a great player ... I'm very honoured to stand next to him.

Menzies announced in July 2008, that he had agreed to a one-year contract with the Bradford Bulls in the Super League for the 2009 season. Manly was unable to offer Menzies a further contract due to salary cap restraints. Menzies stated he could only continue to play overseas as playing against the club he loves "was not an option".

The record of 349 games jointly held by Menzies and Lamb was broken by Brisbane's Darren Lockyer on 12 August 2011.

=== 2010s ===
Menzies extended his contract with the Bradford Bulls until the end of 2010.

After being released by Bradford Bulls at the end of the 2010 season, Menzies signed a one-year deal with French club Catalans Dragons. The season started poorly for the side from the south of France, but the Dragons soon became one of the form sides in Super League.

In September 2012, Menzies announced yet another one-year contract extension with the Catalans Dragons. The Australian former international, who in 2012 became the oldest player in Super League history, started his 21st professional season in 2013.

Menzies was selected for the Exiles squad for the International Origin match against England at Headingley on 10 June 2011.

Menzies announced his forthcoming retirement as a professional rugby league footballer on 4 July 2013. He stated that the current (2013) season would be his last. He explained his decision as "I'm still enjoying playing and I feel good mentally and physically, but it was the right time to finish. My biggest fear was to play one season too long and I'm happy with my decision."

Menzies played his last game at the KC Stadium in Hull on 13 September 2013. Catalans Dragons were eliminated from the Superleague playoffs, losing 14 points to 4 against Hull FC. After the match, the Hull fans paid tribute to Menzies as he joined the Hull players in the Lap of Honour.

In February 2014, Menzies temporarily came out of retirement to play for his old club Manly at the inaugural Auckland Nines competition.

Menzies became a commentator for Foxsports in 2014 before transitioning into a role on The Matty Johns Show in 2015.

== Career statistics ==
Menzies also played 11 tour games (no tests and 4 games from the bench) for Australia on the 1994 Kangaroo tour where he scored 9 tries. During his 20-year career at both club and representative level (not including Kangaroo tour games), Menzies scored at the incredible rate of a try for every 2.05 games he played, or a strike rate of 48.65%.

From 2008 until Round 2 of the 2015 NRL season, Menzies held the record for most tries scored at Brookvale Oval with 78 in his career. This record was broken by Manly fullback Brett Stewart who scored his 78th and 79th tries at the ground in a 24-22 win over the Melbourne Storm on 14 March 2015.

| Team | Matches | Tries | Goals | FG | Points | Years |
|---|---|---|---|---|---|---|
| Manly-Warringah | 280 | 151 | 1 | 0 | 608 | 1993–1999, 2003–2008 |
| Australia (tour games) | 11 | 9 | 0 | 0 | 36 | 1994 |
| City Origin | 8 | 2 | 0 | 0 | 8 | 1995–2005 |
| New South Wales | 20 | 4 | 0 | 0 | 16 | 1995–2006 |
| Australia (Test) | 13 | 9 | 0 | 0 | 36 | 1995–2006 |
| Northern Eagles | 69 | 29 | 0 | 0 | 116 | 2000–2002 |
| Bradford Bulls | 57 | 27 | 1 | 0 | 110 | 2009–2010 |
| Catalans Dragons | 71 | 31 | 0 | 0 | 124 | 2011–2013 |
| Exiles | 2 | 0 | 0 | 0 | 0 | 2012–2013 |
| Total | 531 | 262 | 2 | 0 | 1,054 | 1993–2013 |
