= Josh Perry =

Australia international rugby league footballer

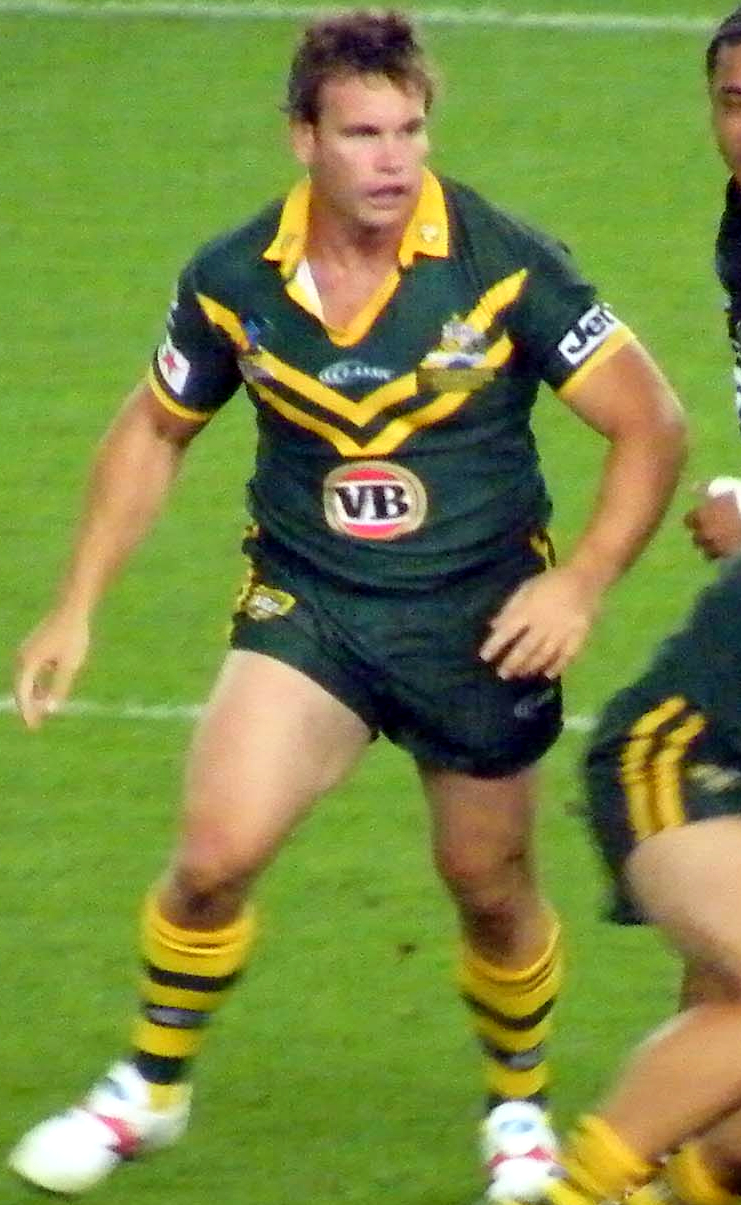

Personal information
- Full name: Joshua Paul Perry
- Born: 4 February 1981 (age 45) Newcastle, New South Wales, Australia

Playing information
- Height: 185 cm (6 ft 1 in)
- Weight: 112 kg (17 st 9 lb)
- Position: Prop
Club
Years	Team	Pld	T	G	FG	P
2000–07	Newcastle Knights	142	15	0	0	60
2008–10	Manly Sea Eagles	69	5	0	0	20
2011–13	St Helens	44	2	0	0	8
	Total	255	22	0	0	88
Representative
Years	Team	Pld	T	G	FG	P
2001–09	NSW Country	5	1	0	0	4
2003–10	New South Wales	3	0	0	0	0
2008–10	Australia	4	0	0	0	0

Josh Perry (born 4 February 1981) is an Australian former professional rugby league footballer. An Australian international and New South Wales State of Origin representative prop, he played in the NRL for the Newcastle Knights, with whom he won the 2001 NRL Premiership and the Manly Warringah Sea Eagles, with whom he won the 2008 NRL Premiership, and played in the Super League for St Helens.

== Background ==
Perry was born in Newcastle, New South Wales, Australia.

Perry attended Caves Beach Public School and his very first Rugby League Club was Swansea Junior Rugby League Club, NSW. He was a Valentine Junior.

His brother James plays for the Philadelphia Fight in the American National Rugby League.

== Playing career ==
=== Club career ===
==== Newcastle Knights ====
Perry made his first-grade début in round 17 of the 2000 season playing for Newcastle against the New Zealand Warriors at EnergyAustralia Stadium on 27 May.

Perry played at prop forward in the 2001 NRL Grand Final-winning Newcastle team that defeated the Parramatta Eels, 30–24 at Stadium Australia on 30 September in an upset victory. Having won the 2001 NRL Premiership, the Newcastle club traveled to England to play the 2002 World Club Challenge against Super League champions, the Bradford Bulls. Perry played at prop forward in Newcastle's loss.

In the 2005 NRL season, Perry was limited to only seven appearances for Newcastle as the club endured a horror year on the field and finished last. In the 2006 NRL season, the club turned their fortunes around by qualifying for the finals. Perry played in the club's 50-6 elimination final loss against the Brisbane Broncos at the Sydney Football Stadium.

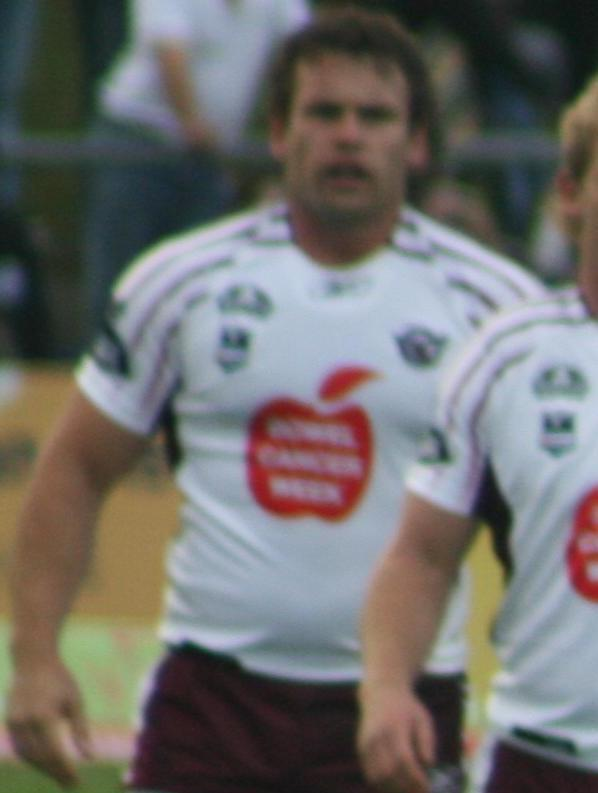
Perry playing for Manly

==== Manly-Warringah Sea Eagles ====
In 2007, Perry came off contract at the Newcastle Knights and he signed for the Manly-Warringah Sea Eagles for the 2008 NRL season on a three-year contract.

In his first year with the Sea Eagles, Perry played in the 2008 NRL Grand Final victory over the Melbourne Storm.

==== St Helens ====
Perry joined English club St Helens for the 2011 season on a three-year contract. Perry saw out his contract and retired from the sport after being released at the end of the 2013 season.

=== Representative career ===
Perry was also selected for Country Origin in 2001, 2003 and 2004, scoring one try in the 2001 match.

Perry was selected to represent New South Wales as a reserve for game I of the 2003 State of Origin series.

In August 2008, Perry was named in the preliminary 46-man Kangaroos squad for the 2008 Rugby League World Cup.

Two days following the 2008 NRL grand final, Perry was named in the 24-man Australia squad for the 2008 Rugby League World Cup. Perry made his test début for Australia against New Zealand from the bench in Australia's opening RLWC 08 game on 26 October.

He was selected for Country in the City vs Country match on 8 May 2009 and selected in the New South Wales team for game 3 in the 2009 series.

Perry was rewarded for his and Manly's good start to 2010 NRL season with selection on the bench for Australia in the 2010 ANZAC Test against New Zealand in Melbourne on 7 May.

== Statistics ==
Year	Team	Games	Tries	Pts
2000	Newcastle Knights	4		
2001	Newcastle Knights	26	3	12
2002	Newcastle Knights	24	1	4
2003	Newcastle Knights	22	6	24
2004	Newcastle Knights	20	1	4
2005	Newcastle Knights	7	1	4
2006	Newcastle Knights	23	2	8
2007	Newcastle Knights	16	1	4
2008	Manly Warringah Sea Eagles	26	4	16
2009	Manly Warringah Sea Eagles	22	1	4
2010	Manly Warringah Sea Eagles	21		
2011	St Helens	12		
2012	St Helens	26		
2013	St Helens	6	2	8
	Totals	255	22	88
