= Des Hasler =

Australian rugby league footballer and coach (born 1961)

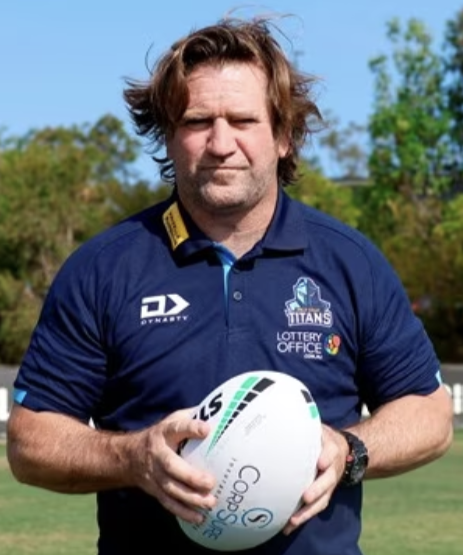

Personal information
- Full name: Desmond John Hasler
- Born: 16 February 1961 (age 65) Gosford, New South Wales, Australia
- Height: 176 cm (5 ft 9 in)
- Weight: 79 kg (12 st 6 lb)

Playing information
- Position: Halfback, Lock, Hooker, Five-eighth
Club
| Years | Team | Pld | T | G | FG | P |
|---|---|---|---|---|---|---|
| 1982–83 | Penrith Panthers | 12 | 5 | 0 | 0 | 20 |
| 1984–93 | Manly Sea Eagles | 209 | 66 | 0 | 0 | 264 |
| 1993–94 | Hull FC | 28 | 10 | 0 | 0 | 40 |
| 1995–96 | Manly Sea Eagles | 47 | 6 | 1 | 0 | 26 |
| 1997 | Western Suburbs | 21 | 6 | 0 | 0 | 24 |
| | Total | 317 | 93 | 1 | 0 | 374 |
Representative
| Years | Team | Pld | T | G | FG | P |
| 1985–92 | NSW City | 8 | 1 | 0 | 0 | 4 |
| 1985–91 | New South Wales | 12 | 2 | 0 | 0 | 8 |
| 1985–91 | Australia | 12 | 2 | 0 | 0 | 8 |

Coaching information
Club
| Years | Team | Gms | W | D | L | W% |
| 2004–11 | Manly Sea Eagles | 206 | 122 | 0 | 84 | 59 |
| 2012–17 | Canterbury Bulldogs | 155 | 88 | 0 | 67 | 57 |
| 2019–22 | Manly Sea Eagles | 97 | 48 | 0 | 49 | 49 |
| 2024–25 | Gold Coast Titans | 48 | 14 | 0 | 34 | 29 |
| | Total | 506 | 272 | 0 | 234 | 54 |
- Source: As of 6 September 2025

Desmond John Hasler (born 16 February 1961) is an Australian professional rugby league coach and former rugby league footballer, who was most recently the head coach of the Gold Coast Titans in the National Rugby League.

Primarily a halfback, he initially played for the Penrith Panthers, and then spent most of his playing career with the Manly Sea Eagles, with whom he won premierships in 1987 and 1996. Hasler spent a season with Hull FC in England, returning to Manly, before finishing his playing career with the Western Suburbs Magpies. He also played for NSW City, New South Wales in State of Origin and Australia at international level.

Hasler coached Manly between 2004 and 2011, winning a further two premierships in 2008 and 2011. He coached the Canterbury Bulldogs in the National Rugby League, before returning to Manly as coach from 2019 until he was sacked at the end of the 2022 season.

== Early life ==
Hasler was born in Gosford, New South Wales. He played his junior footy at Cambridge Park and Brothers Penrith. He attended St Dominic's College, Penrith.

== Playing career ==
Hasler began his first-grade career with the Penrith Panthers in 1982, but quickly transferred to the Manly Warringah Sea Eagles. Hasler's contact with Manly came by chance.

After having played only 12 games for the Penrith club in 1982 and 1983, Bob Fulton, on the lookout for a halfback due to not being satisfied with the defensive play of Phil Blake, offered Hasler a trial at Manly and signed him to play for the Sea Eagles in 1984.

Hasler made his debut for Australia in the third test of the 1985 Trans-Tasman Test series against New Zealand at Carlaw Park in Auckland, coming into the team at the expense of Queensland halfback Mark Murray. Unfortunately his debut was soured with the Kiwis defeating Australia 18–0.

Hasler's value as a utility player led to his frequent selection on the bench in representative football. He played 13 State of Origin matches for New South Wales (seven from the bench, three at halfback, two at five-eighth and 1 at lock), scoring two tries during these games. His biography, The Utility Player, was written by prominent Australian author and Manly Warringah fan Thomas Keneally and was published in 1993.

Hasler also played in twelve test and World Cup matches for Australia between 1985 and 1991, with his utility value seeing him start nine of those games from the bench.

Des Hasler was twice selected to go on a Kangaroo Tour of Great Britain and France, in 1986 and 1990, respectively. Taken over as the No.2 halfback behind tour vice-captain Peter Sterling in 1986, a broken thumb in the first half of his first game in England against Hull Kingston Rovers at Craven Park would interrupt his tour and see him miss an entire month, playing only eight games on tour and no tests other than against Papua New Guinea before the team flew on to England. In 1990 he was largely Bob Fulton's utility player with Hasler not only selected on the bench for all three Ashes series tests against Great Britain (though no bench players were used in the 2nd test at Old Trafford), but he played a variety of positions on the tour including lock, halfback and even out on the wing.

After the 1993 season, Hasler spent the off-season playing for Hull F.C. in the English Rugby League Premiership. He later returned to the Manly club for the 1995 and 1996 ARL seasons. Hasler had a new role for the season playing mostly at hooker. Although starting the 1996 season as the teams hooker, the signing of 1994 Kangaroo tour hooker Jim Serdaris saw Hasler play most of the season from the bench for the Manly Warringah side. The team had another great year, winning their second straight minor premiership before going on to defeat St. George 20–8 in the grand final at the Sydney Football Stadium, giving Hasler his second and last premiership win as a player.

After 257 games for the Manly club over 12 seasons, Manly did not offer Hasler a contract beyond 1996. Feeling he still had something to offer Hasler then signed with the Western Suburbs Magpies for the 1997 season. He played 21 games for Western Suburbs alternating between halfback, lock, hooker and the bench, before retiring at the end of the season.

== Coaching career ==
=== Manly Warringah Sea Eagles ===
In 2004, Des Hasler was appointed head coach of the Manly Sea Eagles. In the 2005, 2006 and 2007 seasons he led the team to the semi-finals for the first time since the late 1990s. Hasler gained the experience of Geoff Toovey as assistant coach in the 2007 season. The team was a contender in the 2007 National Rugby League premiership, and finished second on the NRL ladder, losing the grand final 34–8 to the Melbourne Storm.

He coached Manly to a record-breaking 40–0 2008 NRL Grand Final victory over the Melbourne Storm.

In 2008, Hasler was named the Rugby League International Federation's Coach of the Year at the RLIF Awards.

After failing to win the 1987 World Club Challenge with Manly as a player, he won it with them as coach in 2009.

Hasler took Manly to the finals again in 2009 and 2010, but lost a final in each year to be eliminated from the finals.

He coached his 200th first-grade game on 13 August 2011 when Manly defeated their traditional rivals Parramatta 26–20 at Parramatta Stadium. The win was also Hasler's 117th win as a coach.

In 2011, Manly finished second on the NRL ladder. Manly defeated North Queensland 42–8 at the Sydney Football Stadium for their first finals win since 2008. Manly went on to win the 2011 NRL Grand Final. He was named coach of the year at the RLIF Awards.

A week after leading Manly to the 2011 premiership, Hasler signed to coach the Canterbury Bulldogs in the 2013 season. He initially agreed to continue to coach Manly for the 2012 season, but on 11 November 2011, Manly's board of directors sacked him, alleging "serious breaches" of his contract with rumours rife of the breaches including enticing staff and players to join him at the Bulldogs from 2013. A number of Manly's coaching and administrative employees had announced they would be joining Hasler at Canterbury.

=== Canterbury-Bankstown Bulldogs ===
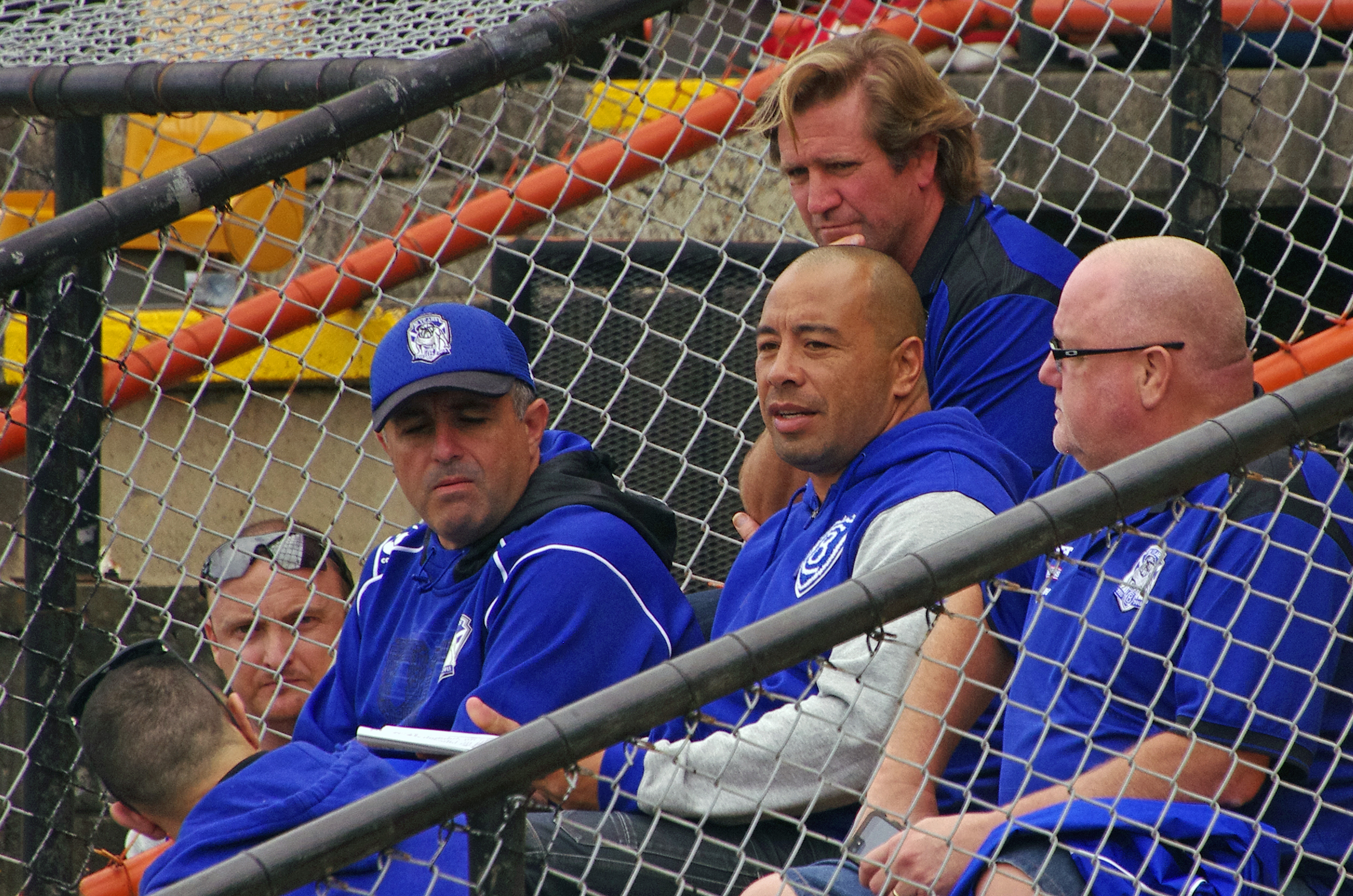
Hasler and his Bulldogs assistant coach Jim Dymock in 2015

Hasler joined Canterbury on 14 November 2011 as head coach for the 2012 NRL season. He had immediate success as he took the club to finish eight places better than the previous season to the top of the ladder and collected the minor premiership. After impressive qualifying final and preliminary final wins, 16–10 over former club Manly Sea Eagles and 32–8 over South Sydney Rabbitohs, respectively, the club were beaten in the Grand Final by the Melbourne Storm 14–4. At the 2012 Dally M Awards Hasler was named the NRL's coach of the year.

In the 2014 NRL season, Hasler led Canterbury to the 2014 NRL Grand Final, and lost 30–6 to South Sydney at ANZ Stadium.

In the 2016 NRL season, Canterbury finished two places lower than the previous season as they finished in seventh place, the same position they managed to reach the Grand Final from two years earlier, but those hopes of a 2014 repeat were crushed in the qualifying elimination final where the Bulldogs after leading 6–4 at half-time but suffered a 28–12 defeat by the Penrith Panthers at the Sydney Football Stadium after which, straight away, Canterbury bowed out of the finals series.

On 19 September 2017, it was announced by the Canterbury Bulldogs that Hasler had been released. On 1 December 2017, it was announced that Hasler was taking Canterbury to court and was seeking $2 million in damages after he was terminated by the club despite signing a two-year contract extension earlier in the season.

On 4 May 2018, Hasler and Canterbury reached an out-of-court settlement for an undisclosed sum of money. Canterbury issued a statement saying "After a great deal of discussion over the last couple of months, the Bulldogs are pleased to have reached an agreement with Des Hasler. It was important for the club to be able to bring this matter to a close and move forward. Our members and fans deserve that."

=== Manly Warringah Sea Eagles ===
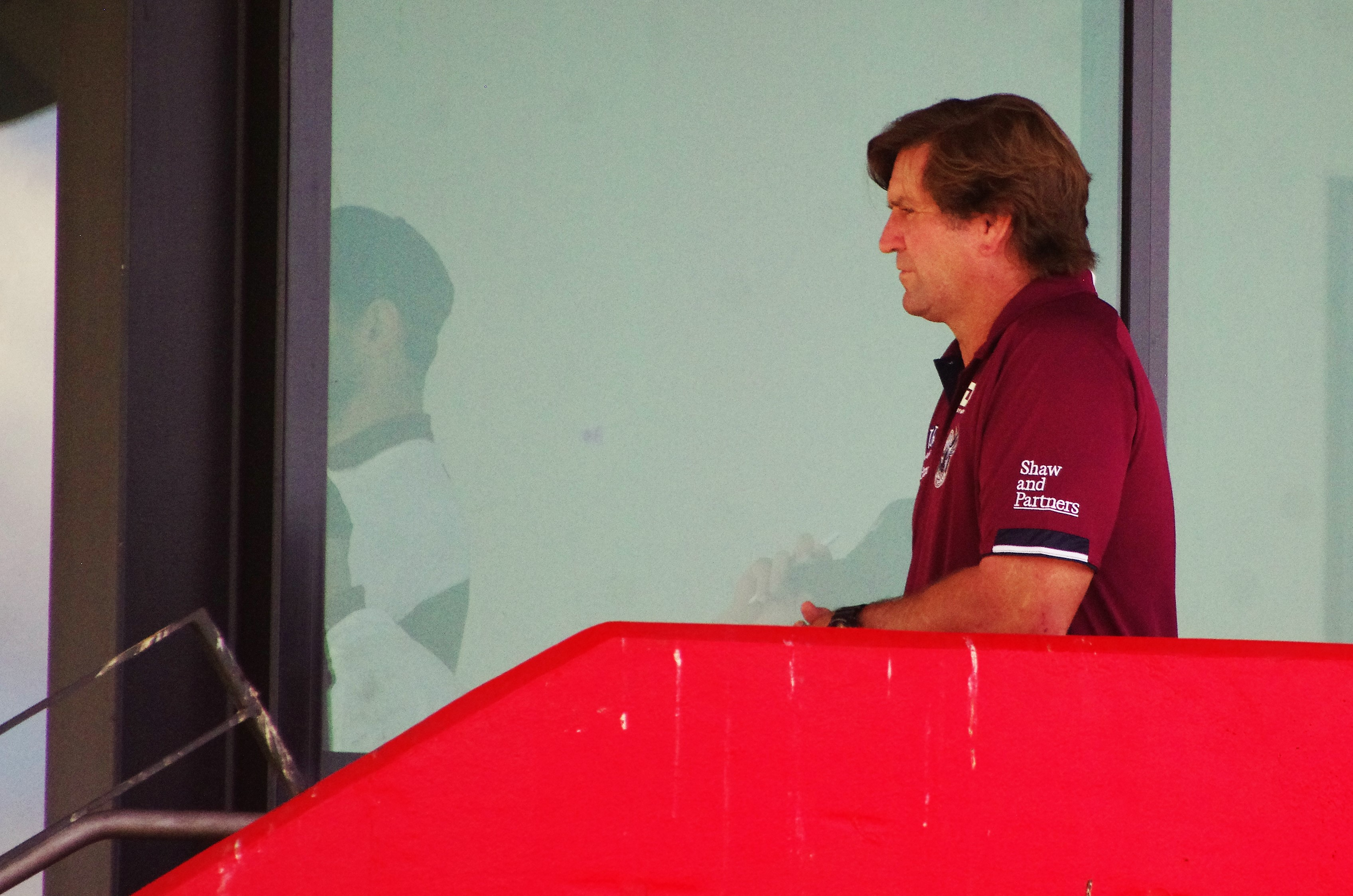
Hasler on duty with Manly in 2021

On 22 October 2018, Hasler was announced as the new head coach of Manly for the 2019 season. Before the start of the 2019 NRL season, many predicted that Manly would finish outside the top 8 and struggle towards the bottom of the table. Throughout the season, though, Manly surprised many critics by spending nearly the entire regular season in the top 8 which included the club defeating Melbourne at AAMI Park 11–10 in golden point extra-time and also defeating other premiership contenders Canberra twice throughout the year. Hasler eventually guided Manly Warringah to a sixth-place finish as the club qualified for the finals.

Hasler guided Manly to the second week of the finals series in 2019 as the club were defeated by South Sydney 34–26 in the elimination semi-final at ANZ Stadium.

In the 2020 NRL season, Hasler failed to guide Manly to the finals as they finished a disappointing 13th on the table. The 2021 NRL season started in similar fashion with the club losing their opening three games. In round 4, Manly were defeated 46–6 against Penrith at Brookvale Oval; this was Manly's biggest-ever loss at their home ground in their 74-year history. Manly under Hasler then went on to win their next 16 of 21 games to finish in the top 4 and qualify for the finals. Manly went on to reach the preliminary final but were defeated by South Sydney. In the 2022 NRL season, Manly endured a poor season finishing 11th on the table. On 13 October 2022, Hasler was terminated as Manly head coach.

=== Gold Coast Titans ===
On 22 June 2023, Hasler was announced as the new head coach of the Gold Coast Titans, commencing in 2024. In round 1 of the 2024 NRL season, Hasler's reign at the Gold Coast got off to the worst possible start as the club lost 28–4 against St. George Illawarra who were tipped by many pundits to finish with the wooden spoon before the season began. Hasler lost his opening six games as Gold Coast head coach before finally earning his first win in charge of the club against the New Zealand Warriors in round 8. In round 16, Hasler guided the Gold Coast to a 66–6 victory over the New Zealand Warriors. It was the clubs biggest-ever victory and the biggest victory of any Gold Coast side since the first one entered the competition back in 1988. The Gold Coast also recorded the biggest victory by a team running last across the 114-year history of top-flight rugby league in Australia. In his first season in charge of the Gold Coast, Hasler took the club to a 14th-placed finish on the table.

In round 21 of the 2025 NRL season, Hasler coached his 500th first grade game as the bottom placed Gold Coast side upset New Zealand 24–16. On 25 August 2025, the Gold Coast club announced that Hasler would depart as head coach at the end of the season despite being under contract until the following season, the club then announced that Josh Hannay would be taking over as head coach from 2026. In Hasler's final game as coach of the Gold Coast, the club won their final match of the 2025 NRL season against the Wests Tigers, which ultimately resulted in Gold Coast narrowly avoiding the wooden spoon on for and against. Despite media speculation that Hasler would retire following the end of his tenure at the Gold Coast, Hasler refuted these claims, stating he would head back down to Sydney and assess future options.

=== Statistics ===
Des Hasler – coaching results by season
| Team | Year | Games | Wins | Draws | Losses | Win % | Position | Finals |
|---|---|---|---|---|---|---|---|---|
| MAN | 2004 | 24 | 9 | 0 | 15 | 38% | 13 / 15 | Did not qualify |
| MAN | 2005 | 25 | 12 | 0 | 13 | 48% | 8 / 15 | Lost Qualifying Final against Parramatta Eels 22–46 |
| MAN | 2006 | 26 | 14 | 0 | 12 | 54% | 5 / 15 | Lost Semi-Final against St George Illawarra Dragons 0–28 |
| MAN | 2007 | 27 | 20 | 0 | 7 | 74% | 2 / 16 | Lost 2007 NRL Grand Final against Melbourne Storm 8–34 |
| MAN | 2008 | 27 | 20 | 0 | 7 | 74% | 2 / 16 | Won 2008 NRL Grand Final against Melbourne Storm 40–0 |
| MAN | 2009 | 25 | 14 | 0 | 11 | 56% | 5 / 16 | Lost Qualifying Final against Melbourne Storm 12–40 |
| MAN | 2010 | 25 | 12 | 0 | 13 | 48% | 8 / 16 | Lost Qualifying Final against St George Illawarra Dragons 0–28 |
| MAN | 2011 | 27 | 21 | 0 | 6 | 78% | 2 / 16 | Won 2011 NRL Grand Final against New Zealand Warriors 24–10 |
| MAN | | 206 | 122 | 0 | 84 | 59% | | |
| BUL | 2012 | 27 | 20 | 0 | 7 | 74% | 1 / 16 | Lost 2012 NRL Grand Final against Melbourne Storm 4–14 |
| BUL | 2013 | 25 | 13 | 0 | 12 | 52% | 6 / 16 | Lost Elimination Final against Newcastle Knights 6–22 |
| BUL | 2014 | 28 | 16 | 0 | 12 | 57% | 7 / 16 | Lost 2014 NRL Grand Final against South Sydney Rabbitohs 6–30 |
| BUL | 2015 | 26 | 15 | 0 | 11 | 58% | 5 / 16 | Lost Semi-Final against Sydney Roosters 12–38 |
| BUL | 2016 | 25 | 14 | 0 | 11 | 56% | 7 / 16 | Lost Elimination Final against Penrith Panthers 12–28 |
| BUL | 2017 | 24 | 10 | 0 | 14 | 42% | 11 / 16 | Did not qualify |
| BUL | | 155 | 88 | 0 | 62 | 59% | | |
| MAN | 2019 | 26 | 15 | 0 | 11 | 58% | 6 / 16 | Lost Semi-Final against South Sydney Rabbitohs 26–34 |
| MAN | 2020 | 20 | 7 | 0 | 13 | 35% | 13 / 16 | Did not qualify |
| MAN | 2021 | 27 | 17 | 0 | 10 | 64% | 4 / 16 | Lost Preliminary Final against South Sydney Rabbitohs 16–36 |
| MAN | 2022 | 24 | 9 | 0 | 15 | 38% | 11 / 16 | Did not qualify |
| MAN | | 97 | 48 | 0 | 49 | 49% | | |
| GLD | 2024 | 24 | 8 | 0 | 16 | 33% | 14 / 17 | Did not qualify |
| Career | | 482 | 266 | 0 | 216 | 55% | | |

== Honours ==
=== As a player ===
Manly Warringah Sea Eagles

- NSWRL / ARL Premiership: 1987, 1996
- NSWRL / ARL Minor Premiership: 1987, 1995, 1996

=== As a coach ===
Manly Warringah Sea Eagles

- NRL Premiership: 2008, 2011

Canterbury-Bankstown Bulldogs

- NRL Minor Premiership: 2012
