= History of the Manly Warringah Sea Eagles =

The history of the Manly Warringah Sea Eagles dates back to 1932 when the Manly-Warringah Junior Rugby Football League was founded. In 1947 the New South Wales Rugby Football League included two additional teams: Manly-Warringah DRLFC and Parramatta DRLFC. The new club adopted the nickname "Sea Eagles" and went on to compete in every season of top-level rugby league until merging with the nearby North Sydney Bears to form the Northern Eagles club at the end of 1999. After three years the joint-venture team was disbanded with the Manly-Warringah Sea Eagles returning as a sole entity once more to the National Rugby League.

== Background ==
In Australia, before 1908, most football clubs in Sydney played by the rules of the Rugby Football Union and had done so since the first R.F.U. rules were written in 1871. As the professional game came to Sydney, the bigger inner city districts left their affiliation with the Rugby Football Union and created a new top flight football competition in 1908.

Two factors prevented the initial inclusion of a Manly team into the competition. Firstly, with the Manly Rugby Union Club only recently gaining acceptance into the Sydney competition, many involved were not prepared to take a chance on the new code, which had yet to prove itself as a sustainable entity. Add to this a population base barely in the thousands, and well spread out among the many farms in the region, and sustainable support would have been difficult to envisage.

With a strong growth in local population through the 1920s, the Manly-Warringah Junior Rugby Football League was founded 11 February 1932 with six clubs established for the local competition. The formation of this League entitled Manly's inclusion into the President's Cup, a junior district competition run by the NSWRL. The headquarters of the Juniors had since at least 1939 been Brookvale Oval.

After unsuccessful attempts in 1937 and 1944, early in 1946 the Manly-Warringah Junior Rugby Football League again applied to the NSWRL for the club's 1947 admission to the district first grade (now NRL).

During 1946, two meetings involving the North Sydney club which would seal Manly's future. Their first encounter was played out on 17 June 1946 when the two districts met in the final of the President's Cup; played in front of 64,527 spectators as the curtain raiser for the First Test against the touring British Lions. Manly maintained an early lead to claim the match, 12–8.

The second meeting was between the senior NSWRL clubs on 4 November 1946, in which the North Sydney club supported the inclusion of Manly into the senior competition, despite knowing that many of its Manly players would no longer be eligible to play for North Sydney due to the district residential rule of the time.

With the Manly club being successful this time, a public meeting on 20 November 1946 saw the formation of the Manly-Warringah District Rugby League Football Club. The club took on the colours of maroon and white. These were adopted from the colours of the President's Cup side which appears to have utilised the colours of the local Freshwater Surf Lifesaving Club, established in 1908, and of which Ken Arthurson and other players were members. Brookvale Oval was established as the team's home ground.

=== 1947–1949 ===
12 April 1947 saw the Manly club taking on the Western Suburbs club in its first official game in the NSWRFL senior competition, but despite scoring three tries (the first of which came from Keith "Meggsy" Kirkwood) to Wests' one, the Manly side went down 15–13. The lineup for that match was: A 'Bert' Collins, Jim Walsh, C 'Kelly' McMahon, Mackie Campbell, Johnny Bliss, Merv Gillmer, Gary Maddrell, James Hall, Keith Kirkwood, Max Whitehead (c), Pat Hines, Ern Cannon, Harry Grew. The coach was Harold Johnson.

The club's first win in the top league was a 15–7 victory against fellow newcomers Parramatta, at Brookvale Oval, 31 May 1947. By season's end, Manly had racked up just four victories from 18 rounds, which was enough to avoid the wooden spoon, with Parramatta winning one less game for the season.

The 1948–1950 period saw the club languish at the bottom of the table, coming ninth, eighth and eighth out of ten. However, the club did have local junior Roy Bull selected for an Australian Test team which played against New Zealand in October 1949, thus becoming Manly-Warringah's first home-grown International.

=== 1950s ===
The Manly-Warringah club originally had played in a maroon jersey with a large white 'V' on the front. The club was one of the first to feature a crest or emblem, with an MW on a crest appearing in the early 1950s. Far from the flashy emblems worn today, the Manly 'Sea Eagle' which appeared in the mid-1950s was often confused for a seagull by many, including the media. As there were no official nicknames for clubs at the time, more an adopted 'mascot', it was not considered an issue.

On 25 April 1951, a new attendance record at Brookvale was set at 9,447, with spectators overflowing onto the field for a match between Manly and South Sydney. The 1951 team won 11 games, finishing second at the end of the regular season, and were in their first finals campaign. After accounting for both Wests and St George in the semi-finals, Manly were to meet a South Sydney side which were the reigning Premiers and had won the minor premiership by 11 points. The result was a 42–14 loss for Manly.

In 1952, Roy Bull became the club's first ever Kangaroo Tourist when he was selected to go on the 1952–53 Kangaroo tour of Great Britain and France. He would play 17 games on the Kangaroo Tour, four of them test matches for Australia.

1956 saw the first of 11 Premierships for the St George club, resulting in two more runners-up trophies for Manly in both 1957 (31-9) and 1959 (20-0). The 1957 season saw a young Ken Arthurson take the reins as the Manly coach, a position he held until the 1961 season.

=== 1960s ===
From the 1960 to the 1969 seasons, Manly's form ranged from third-place finishes in 1961 and 1966, to an eighth placing in 1964.

The combination of the return of Wally O'Connell to the club as coach in 1966, and the development of Ken Arthurson's skill as an administrator professionalized the club. With the groundwork laid and a couple of years of development of the future Immortal Bob Fulton, the 1968 competition saw Manly compete with St George and South Sydney.

At the end of the home and away season, Manly finished second, one point behind reigning Premiers, South Sydney. The Major Semi-Final saw Manly beat Souths, 23–15, but the clubs soon met again in the Grand Final where the Rabbitohs proved too strong and won the decider, 13–9.

=== 1970s ===
The 1970 season ended with Manly losing to the South Sydney Rabbitohs 23–12.

By the end of the regular 1971 season, the club had both the best defence and attack record, lost three games and claimed their maiden Minor Premiership over second placed Rabbitohs. However, they did not made the final due to two successive losses.

The Sea Eagles finished as 1972 Minor Premiers and heading into the finals series with 12 wins and 1 draw from the last 13 rounds.

The Major Semi saw Manly taking on Easts and winning 32–8, before meeting again in the decider two weeks later where Manly-Warringah claimed their maiden Premiership, 19–14 in front of 54,537 fans at the Sydney Cricket Ground.

- 16 September 1972

Manly-Warringah Sea Eagles: Graham Eadie, Ken Irvine, Ray Branighan, Bob Fulton, Max Brown, Ian Martin, Dennis Ward, Mal Reilly, Terry Randall, Allan Thomson, John O'Neill, Fred Jones (c), Bill Hamilton

Coach: Ron Willey

Manly-Warringah Sea Eagles - 19 (Jones, Branighan tries; Branighan 6 goals; Fulton field goal) defeated Eastern Suburbs Roosters - 14 (Ballesty, Mullins tries; McKean 4 goals)

The 1973 finals were the first to feature five teams, allowing the Minor Premiers a week off during the first round of finals. The 14–4 win by Manly over Cronulla in the first week of the finals saw the club with a week off before again meeting Cronulla in the Grand Final.

The 1973 Grand Final is often quoted as one of the most brutal games in Rugby League history. Led by a ferocious forward pack, the Cronulla side looked to unsettle the reigning Premiers, and the game was riddled with fights, late hits and illegal play from both sides. Key Manly playmaker Malcolm "Mal" Reilly was taken out early when hit late and did not return after halftime. Bob Fulton's superior skills shone through, and the Sharks plan to unsettle the Sea Eagles was foiled. Fulton's two tries saw the Manly side win 10-7 and claim the Premiership for the second time.

- 15 September 1973

Manly-Warringah Sea Eagles: Graham Eadie, Ken Irvine, Ray Branighan, Bob Fulton, Max Brown, Ian Martin, Johnny Mayes, Mal Reilly, Terry Randall, Peter Peters, John O'Neill, Fred Jones (c), Bill Hamilton

Replacement: John Bucknall for Mal Reilly, injured

Coach: Ron Willey.

Manly-Warringah Sea Eagles - 10 (Fulton 2 tries; Eadie 2 goals) defeated Cronulla-Sutherland Sharks - 7 (Bourke try; Rogers 2 goals)

In the 1974 and 1975 seasons were dominated by an unstoppable Eastern Suburbs club, winning the Minor Premierships by 8 and 10 points. Against this juggernaut, the Manly club finished second on the table for both seasons, losing a total of four out the five finals game and failing to qualify for either Grand Final.

Manly held off the Parramatta to win the Minor Premiership in the 1976 season. During their two meetings during the regular season, the Eels had proved too strong on both occasions and followed that up with another win, this time in the Major Semi Final. Manly went on to beat Canterbury to set up a rematch against Parramatta in the Grand Final, where Manly won their third Premiership in five years.

- 18 September 1976

Manly-Warringah Sea Eagles: Graham Eadie, Tom Mooney, Russel Gartner, Bob Fulton (c), Rod Jackson, Alan Thompson, Gary Stephens, Ian Martin, Phil Lowe, Steve Norton, Terry Randall, Max Krilich, John Harvey

Replacements: Gary Thoroughgood for Ian Martin; Mark Willoughby for Phil Lowe

Coach: Frank Stanton

Manly-Warringah Sea Eagles - 13 (Lowe try; Eadie 5 goals) defeated Parramatta Eels - 10 (Porter, Gerard tries; Peard 2 goals)

Manly started the 1977 season with three solid wins, despite the loss of Bob Fulton to the Roosters, however, four losses in a row saw the club lose momentum with only a last round victory against the Balmain Tigers at Leichhardt Oval securing fifth spot from a fast-finishing Cronulla side. However, the Tigers reversed the result in the first week of the finals, to knock the Sea Eagles out of title contention. After the 1977 NSWRFL season Roy Bull was elected the Manly-Warringah club's president, succeeding Bill Cameron who had held the position for the previous 19 years.

Success for the club during the 1970s culminated with the club scoring a fourth Premiership in another Grand Final against the Cronulla Sharks during the 1978 season. Unlike the three previous titles, the club did not win the Minor Premiership. It also was unique insofar as Manly were required to replay two drawn matches through the finals campaign. Week one of the finals saw Manly beaten by Cronulla 17–12; the boot of Steve Rogers proving the difference with both teams scoring three tries each. The Minor Semi Final against Parramatta ended in a draw: the teams met again three days later where Manly scored a 17–11 victory.

Another three-day turnaround saw Manly play and account for the Minor Premiers, Western Suburbs which allowed the team a full week off before the Grand Final. Like the decider of the previous year, the match was drawn and a replay was required. However, unlike in 1977, the 1978 Grand Final replay could not be played the following weekend as normal due to Australia's 1978 Kangaroo tour squad (which Frank Stanton was the head coach) was due to depart for England. This the replay was played on the Tuesday, only 3 days after the drawn game. In their 6th game in 24 days, Manly scored a 16–0 victory over the Sharks, claiming their fourth Premiership in seven years.

- 1978, 19 September (Grand Final Replay)

Manly-Warringah Sea Eagles: Graham Eadie, Tom Mooney, Stephen Knight, Russel Gartner, Simon Booth, Alan Thompson, Steve Martin, Ian Martin, Terry Randall, Bruce Walker, John Harvey, Max Krilich (c), Ian Thomson

Replacements: Ray Branighan for Simon Booth; Wayne Springall for Ian Martin

Coach: Frank Stanton.

Manly-Warringah Sea Eagles - 16 (Gartner 2, Eadie tries; Eadie 3 goals; field goal) defeated Cronulla Sharks - 0

After the 1978 Grand Final victory, a record 9 Manly players were selected for the Kangaroo Tour, though both Terry Randall (exhaustion) and Bruce Walker (personal reasons) declined to tour. One notable omission from the touring squad was try scoring three-quarter Russel Gartner who had played in Australia's 1977 Rugby League World Cup final winning side.

Manly-Warringah missed the finals by finishing seventh in both the 1979 and 1980 seasons. Before the start of the 1979 season, Ken Arthurson signed a 19-year-old lock forward from the Wests Panthers in Brisbane named Paul Vautin.

=== 1980s ===
Club officials lured three players from the Western Suburbs Magpies across to the peninsula. The signings of Kangaroo internationals Les Boyd, John Dorahy and Ray Brown for the 1980 season led to a deep acrimony between the two clubs, quickly developing on the field into the 'Silvertails' versus 'Fibros'; the haves against the have-nots.

The 1981 season saw the club shake off the inconsistency of the previous two years and make the finals, holding off a challenge from Western Suburbs to claim fifth place. Beating Cronulla-Sutherland in the elimination final, the Sea Eagles were not able to reproduce that form and were beaten the following week by eventual Runners-Up, Newtown. At the end of the season, Manly signed Queensland State of Origin centre Chris Close for 3 years.

The 1982 premiership saw a tight battle for finals placings which eventually saw Manly take second position and back in the hunt for a title. Manly's final campaign began strongly with a thrashing of North Sydney, followed by a shutout of the Parramatta team to move into the Grand Final. Parramatta had a strong win against Eastern Suburbs Preliminary Final, setting up another showdown against the Sea Eagles.

Including the Major-Semi final just two weeks earlier, Manly entered the contest having defeated the Eels in their two recent encounters. However, a dominant Brett Kenny saw Parramatta take the game and successfully defend their crown, 21–8. Following the Grand Final loss, 6 players were selected to the 1982 Kangaroo tour. Coached by Frank Stanton (now at Balmain), the 1982 Kangaroos became the first touring squad to go through Great Britain and France undefeated, thus earning themselves the nickname The Invincibles.

The 1983 season saw Fulton return from Eastern Suburbs, this time as the coach, bringing with him NSW representative second row / centre Noel "Crusher" Cleal and Kangaroos test winger Kerry Boustead. Fulton guided the team to the Minor Premiership by eight points. Manly looked to be well on its way to breaking through for a fifth premiership after exacting revenge for two losses during the season to Parramatta, claiming victory against the Eels in the Major Semi final, 19–10. But, in an almost carbon-copy of the 1982 decider, Parramatta bounced back strongly in their next game before again beating Manly to claim the title, 18–6, Brett Kenny again the main destroyer scoring 2 tries (Kenny scored doubles in the 1981, 1982 and 1983 Grand Finals). During the 1983 season, teenage halfback Phil Blake scored 27 tries for Manly, breaking the record of 24 scored by Kevin Junee in 1974. As of 2017 this is still the club record for most tries in a season.

After the disappointment of losing the 1983 Grand Final, the team were unable to make a strong claim for the title during the 1984 season. Just once did Manly enjoy a winning streak of more than two, but still finished in fourth position. After beating Canberra in a mid-week play-off for fifth, South Sydney knocked the Sea Eagles out of the finals in the first weekend with a 22–18 win. Joining the club in 1984 was young Penrith Panthers reserve halfback Des Hasler.

Early in the 1985 season, Manly were challenging for a top two position, but a lack of momentum in the last half of the season saw the club unable to build on this position. At the completion of the regular season, the Sea Eagles still needed to win a mid-week final against Penrith to attempt to claim fifth position, but the boot of Greg Alexander carried the Penrith Panthers to a 10–7 victory and into their first finals campaign. Bob Fulton installed Queensland and Australian representative back rower Paul Vautin as the club captain in 1985. Prior to the season, Manly signed pacey 19-year-old Sarina (Queensland) outside back Dale Shearer.

Although Manly finished in fourth in 1986, the closeness of the competition meant that any of the finals teams were capable of beating the others on their day. Fifth place again had to be decided by a mid-week play-off, this time Balmain beat Norths and progressed to a meeting with Manly for the first week of the finals. The Tigers scored a strong 29–22 win and Manly were knocked out of the finals in the first week, for the second year in a row. Manly were without the services of captain Paul Vautin for most of the season after the test back rower had broken his arm in a game against Penrith in late April. At the end of the season, 4 players (Cleal, Hasler, Shearer and Phil Daley, the son of club secretary Doug Daley) were selected to go on the 1986 Kangaroo tour. Prior to the end of the season, Manly also signed goal kicking outside back and dual-rugby international Michael O'Connor from St George for the 1987 season. O'Connor would give Manly fans cause for optimism by being the top point scorer on the Kangaroo Tour with 170 points (13 tries, 59 goals) including a personal haul of 44 points (4 tries, 14 goals) in the Kangaroos 3-0 Ashes series win over Great Britain.

Led by captain Paul Vautin and coached by Manly legend Bob Fulton, the 1987 Sea Eagles dominated the competition and took the Minor Premiership by six points, including a then premiership record 12 wins in a row. Meeting second placed Easts in the second week of the finals, the Sea Eagles did enough to get over the Roosters, 10–6, and move into the Grand Final.

Joining Manly in the last Grand Final to be played in front of 50,201 at the Sydney Cricket Ground were the Canberra Raiders who had joined the competition in 1982. On an unseasonably hot day, the Sea Eagles scored a solid 18–8 victory to secure their fifth title. Although the score was tight, it didn't show Manly's domination on the day. Canberra's only realistic scoring opportunity to score came when five-eighth Chris O'Sullivan crossed for a try late in the game. Manly only scored two tries, though they had opportunities for another five or six but were thwarted each time (often by their own mistakes). Michael O'Connor kicked 5 goals from 5 attempts in the Grand Final, as well as scoring a try, to ensure the premiership would return to the peninsula for the first time since 1978. However, on the day there was none better than Manly five-eighth Cliff Lyons who made line breaks almost at will in the first half and brought up the first score of the game when he received a pass from fullback Dale Shearer from a scrum win 10 metres out from the Raiders line, and beat both O'Sullivan and Queensland Origin fullback Gary Belcher to score. For his efforts, Lyons was awarded the Clive Churchill Medal as the Man of the Match.

- 27 September 1987

Manly-Warringah Sea Eagles: Dale Shearer, David Ronson, Darrell Williams, Michael O'Connor, Stuart Davis, Cliff Lyons, Des Hasler, Paul Vautin (c), Noel Cleal, Ron Gibbs, Kevin Ward, Mal Cochrane, Phil Daley

Replacements: Mark Pocock for Noel Cleal; Paul Shaw for head bin (twice for Ron Gibbs)

Coach: Bob Fulton , Manly-Warringah Sea Eagles - 18 (Lyons, O'Connor tries; O'Connor 5 goals) defeated Canberra Raiders - 8 (O'Sullivan try; Meninga, Belcher goals). Clive Churchill Medal - Cliff Lyons

Less than two weeks later, the premiers traveled to Wigan, England, to face the reigning English champions, Wigan in the 1987 World Club Challenge. In only the second such World Club Challenge match since the Eastern Suburbs Roosters mid-season win against St. Helens at the SCG in 1976, Manly lost the match 8–2. The game was played at Wigan's home ground, the famous Central Park in front of 36,895 fans, though it was rumoured that the actual attendance was closer to 50,000. Manly second rower "Rambo" Ronny Gibbs, in his last game for the club before moving to the new Gold Coast Seagulls in 1989, became the first player sent off in a World Club Challenge after a high tackle on Wigan's international centre Joe Lydon.

With the expansion of the NSWRL seeing new teams from Newcastle and Queensland, the first round of the 1988 season saw the reigning premiers taking on a Brisbane Broncos team featuring many of Queensland's top players including Australian captain Wally Lewis and representative players Colin Scott, Gene Miles, Allan Langer, Bryan Neibling, Greg Dowling and Greg Conescu. Manly were never in the match and lost to the Brisbane side, 44–10. By the end of the regular season, Manly finished third but were eliminated in the first week, 19–6, by Grand Final bound Balmain.

During the 1988 season, Manly played the Great Britain Lions under lights at Brookvale Oval as part of the 1988 Great Britain Lions tour. Missing six regular first grade players (Vautin, Shearer, O'Connor, Daley, Ronson and Cochrane), the makeshift Sea Eagles put the Mal Reilly coached Lions to the sword with a 30–0 win in front of 21,131 fans, the largest non-test attendance of the Lions tour. Teenage halfback Geoff Toovey, playing only his third game of top grade football, scored one of Manly's 5 tries for the game and was awarded the Man of the Match. Among the beaten Lions that night were test players the caliber of Martin Offiah, Karl Fairbank, Phil Ford, Carl Gibson, Andy Platt and Lee Crooks.

With Bob Fulton taking on the Australian coaching job, another former Manly favourite was brought in to fill his shoes. International Alan Thompson distinguished himself in the maroon and white over a 263-game career at five-eighth had coached the club's Reserve Grade side to the 1987 Grand Final before winning the 1988 Grand Final. During the 1989 season the clubs attack stalled and finished twelfth. Thompson was sacked and the club bought in successful Wigan coach, Graham Lowe.

The 1989 season was one of disharmony for the Manly club. With Bob Fulton now gone, the club board took back control of the club (popular theory said that Fulton had almost total control during his time as coach). With the first grade side showing poor form, club secretary Doug Daley allegedly approached the playing group at a mid-season training session and offered a release for any player who wished to leave the club. Three days later, Dale Shearer asked for a release only to be denied by Daley who claimed that it was only for the time he offered it and no longer stood. The matter would end up in court and Shearer was granted his release to join the Brisbane Broncos. Also, at the end of the season long serving club captain Paul Vautin was offered only a 1-year contract at approximately half of his reported 1989 salary of AU$95,000. Vautin subsequently left the club to join Eastern Suburbs. Club vice-captain Noel Cleal also faced the same situation and ultimately announced his retirement from playing at the end of the season. Cleal would take up the position of assistant coach with the Hull F.C. club in the English premiership.

=== 1990s ===
The 1990 and 1991 seasons saw the club return to the finals football, but no premierships. The 1990 side, coached by former New Zealand and Wigan head coach Graham Lowe who had replaced 1989 coach Alan Thompson who had been sacked after failing to make the finals, started slow but eventually finished the regular season in fourth and facing Balmain in the first week of the finals, which the Sea Eagles won. However, a tryless effort against the Broncos in the second week saw the club go no further in their campaign. One of Lowe's biggest recruits for Manly in 1990 was goal kicking former All Blacks fullback Matthew Ridge. Such was Ridge's form after coming over from rugby union that he was selected to the New Zealand test team after only 5 games for the Sea Eagles.

Finishing second in 1991, Manly succumbed in successive finals matches, losing first to North Sydney then knocked out in the second week by Canberra.

The 1992 season featured only one team in the finals from the previous year. Manly's recent improvements in attack disappeared and they missed out, finishing eighth. At the end of the season, club captain and dual-rugby international Michael O'Connor retired from playing.

During the 1993 season, after a previous health scare, Graham Lowe eventually succumbed to a serious health issue which forced him from his coaching role. This saw the club send out an SOS to Australian coach Bob Fulton to return to club coaching, an SOS he immediately answered. In one of the closest finishes to the top of the table, only two points separated first and fifth, with Manly finishing in fourth position. Manly's first match in the finals was against fifth-placed Brisbane and they were again outclassed by the reigning premiers and were eliminated on the first weekend of finals.

Over the course of the 1994 season, the club displayed a further improvement in their attacking skills, including the club record 61–0 victory over 1993 grand finalists, St George. Finishing fourth, the Sea Eagles again met the fifth placed Broncos in the first week of finals, but were unable to reverse the result of 1993 and were eliminated from the finals series, 16–4.

Throughout the mid-1990s, rumours of a separate League developed into a major split of the code in Australia. With News Ltd's backing, the Brisbane Broncos and Canberra Raiders pushed hard for better input to the game, feeling that the Sydney-centric ARL was not meeting their needs. Despite all the rhetoric of better player conditions, the resultant Super League developed into a push by Rupert Murdoch's News Ltd to develop a competition that would be used as the flagship of his fledgling Pay TV sports channel, Fox Sports.

The Manly-Warringah club remained solid with the ARL with only a handful of players, including Matthew Ridge, Ian Roberts and Owen Cunningham, committing to Super League.

Against the backdrop of Super League and resultant Super League War throughout the 1995 season, Manly dominated the season losing only two matches to finish as minor premiers. They won their first 15 matches in a row, a club record, and missed out on the highest number of points scored by the club by just three.

In 1995, Manly's star representative forward Ian Roberts became the first high-profile Australian sports person and first rugby footballer in the world to come out to the public as gay.

With the increase of teams from 16 to 20, a new finals format was introduced and consisted of the top eight sides at the end of the regular season. In the first week of the finals, Manly beat Cronulla before a two-week break and another victory, this time against the Newcastle Knights. Manly were to face the finals series surprise packet, Sydney Bulldogs (Canterbury), which despite finishing the season in sixth place, had already beaten favourites Brisbane and Canberra in the finals. Despite being clear favourites to hold off the Bulldogs challenge, Manly struggled to match the intensity of their rivals and lost, 17-4

Over the course of the 1996 season Manly, on the back of its defence which conceded less than 9-points per game, produced one of its most dominant displays since joining the competition in 1947 to claim its eighth Minor Premiership. A tight win against the Sydney City Roosters and a shutout of Cronulla saw the club meeting St George in the Grand Final.

Manly won their sixth title with a comfortable 20–8 victory, but it wasn't without controversy, with a try just before halftime award on the back of the referee's decision to allow play-on after an apparent tackle put the Dragons' defence on the back foot.

- 29 September 1996

Manly-Warringah Sea Eagles: Matthew Ridge, Danny Moore, Craig Innes, Terry Hill, John Hopoate, Nik Kosef, Geoff Toovey(c), David Gillespie, Jim Serdaris, Mark Carroll, Steve Menzies, Daniel Gartner, Owen Cunningham.

Interchange: Cliff Lyons, Neil Tierney, Craig Hancock, Des Hasler

Coach: Bob Fulton.

Manly-Warringah Sea Eagles - 20 (Innes, Menzies, Moore tries; Ridge 3, Innes goals) defeated St George Dragons - 8 (Zisti try; Bartrim 2 goals)

Despite the loss of a couple of players to Super League, the club still held the nucleus of the squad together for a tilt at back-to-back titles in the split 1997 season competition. By the end of the regular season, Manly finished on top of the table and earned a break from the first round of finals in the seven-team format.

The Sea Eagles accounted for the Knights in the second week of the finals, before scoring a tight win against the Roosters to qualify for the Grand Final. Manly were again clear favourites and for the first hour, they had the premiership in their grasp, holding on to a 10-point lead. Two tries to Newcastle fullback, Robbie O'Davis, soon had the clubs tied at 16-all with full-time looming. Only seconds from seeing the game enter into extra-time, Newcastle halfback, Andrew Johns, wrong-footed the defence to send his winger, Darren Albert over the try line.

The start of the 1998 season saw a much anticipated match up between the Super League champions Brisbane and the ARL high flyers, Manly. The Sea Eagles went down 22-6 and an inconsistent season saw the club rely on a late winning streak of six matches to finish out the regular season and limp into the finals in tenth place. Facing Canberra in the first week of the finals, Manly were convincingly beaten 17–4; the last time the club would play finals football until 2005.

From one of the richer clubs in the League, Manly were by now struggling to keep up with player payments and were unable to entice players to the club. Much talk was made about a possible joint venture between local rivals Manly and Norths with both teams were in need of the $10M on offer. With these issues in the background, Manly turned up to the regular season seven rounds late and soon Bob Fulton quit his head coach position due to his wife's health concerns. Peter Sharp took over the reins and won his first three games, a record result for a caretaker coach in the League.

By halfway through the season, it was obvious that the club would be missing their first finals campaign since 1992 and when they finished thirteenth, it was their lowest relative placing since 1989. But unlike previous eras when the club could look to purchase key players, there was simply no money left.

A consolidation of the competition meant that a criterion was imposed and those not making the cut would not be involved in the 2000 season. The NRL imposed a time limit on the acceptance of a merger offer, or clubs could try their luck through the criteria. Both Manly and Norths administrators were not keen on approaching a merger, but with Manly's financial problems and North Sydney effectively insolvent due to disastrous year when a planned move to the Central Coast was delayed, both sides met to talk of a joint venture. Although the criteria result was in the positive for the Manly club, financial realities meant that there was not much success likely in the future. Due to their insolvency, the North Sydney club were not even considered for the criteria.

In late 1999, the clubs agreed to a joint venture and the Northern Eagles were born.

=== Northern Eagles ===
Unlike the successful St. George Dragons and Illawarra Steelers merger of 1999, restrictions imposed on the clubs meant that half of the combined squad had to be released prior to kick-off as the Northern Eagles, on 5 February 2000.

Despite a first up win against the Newcastle Knights, a lack of consistent on-field success and continuing financial problems saw the joint venture gradually suffer with a lack of support from the Central Coast supporters, who felt the team forced onto them, and the Manly faithful who disappeared from Brookvale Oval.

Although officially dissolved in August 2001, the club continued to play out of both Brookvale and Graeme Park (Central Coast Stadium) until the lead up to the Round 16 clash with Melbourne in 2002. Originally scheduled for Graeme Park, fierce opposition by Central Coast locals and some media identities forced the club to cease playing in Gosford.

With the club returning to Brookvale Oval full-time they were by now the Northern Eagles in name only. In 2003 they re-entered the league as the Manly-Warringah Sea Eagles.

=== 2000s ===
Emerging from the failed merger through 2002, Manly were still on shaky ground both on and off the field. The reversion of the NRL licence to Manly meant that contracts with the Northern Eagles were now void. Waiting on further payments, many players left and the club soon developed a high turnover of journeyman and fringe first graders which saw a further lack of stability both on and off the field. With no major sponsor and little public interest with either spectators or through merchandise, the club's finances were so bad that the football club was only days from closing its doors midway through the 2002 season. In June, initial efforts by the Penn family and then a multimillion-dollar deal with local developer, Max Delmege, led to the future privatisation of the club and financial security.

Results on the field during 2003 season were generally poor, with the club regularly conceding 50-plus score lines, even at Brookvale Oval. By the end of the regular season the club finished 14th; just one position above wooden-spooners, South Sydney.

With the club still suffering with poor finances, and despite the cash injection of $10,000,000 granted to the Northern Eagles entity, a change in direction was needed.

In November 2003, Scott Penn offered the Football Club $5,000,000 for a half-share of the Sea Eagles, with the partnership with the Football Club anticipated to contribute $10,000,000 over four years. The deal required 75 percent support by the football club members, and was tabled at the Annual General meeting on 18 December 2003. Despite football and leagues club board support, the necessary numbers did not favour privatisation and the motion was defeated.

After initially saving the club from closure in early 2004, with an injection of much needed money in the form of sponsorship, Max Delmege received football club members support for his privatisation deal on 3 June 2004. The deal was passed with 93% support (162-10 in favour) and saw Delmege pay $3.5 million for a 65.5 per cent share, not including ongoing sponsorship of $1,000,000 per year.

Initial share holdings saw Delmege hold 3.5mil, Manly Football Club with 2mil, and Penn Sports take 100,000. An additional 4.4mil shares were to be made available to members, supporters and investors. The new board would feature six directors with two from the Football Club, two from the Leagues Club and two appointed from Delmege, with an independent chairman appointed by the six directors.

Effectively, the members voted for the approval of Special Resolutions to allow for the privatisation of the Football Club to proceed. The club was now Manly-Warringah Sea Eagles Limited. This entity holds the NRL Licence and manages the clubs employees from the players right through to the front office, organisation of sponsorships and merchandise, provides hospitality and prepares for games played out of Brookvale Oval. It is also responsible for running the lower grades in the NSWRL competitions.

"I'm very passionate about this club and want to see it get back to where it was, a very successful rugby league team." Max Delmege, June 2004.

The club made no strong moves in the player market ahead of the 2004 season, but there was one significant change to the roster with Peter Sharp axed and his assistant coach, Des Hasler, taking over the head coach role. Manly won just two more games than 2003 to finish thirteenth, but this slight improvement on the table was tempered by the club enduring their worst loss up to that time, going down 72–12 to the Penrith Panthers in Round 22. As if to highlight the inconsistencies of the team, the Sea Eagles produced their best result for the season with a 48–10 win against Newcastle the following week; the highest turn-around in NSWRL/ARL/NRL history.

The purchase of representative players Ben Kennedy, Michael Witt and Brent Kite, ahead of the 2005 season were the clubs first significant signings since the mid-1990s and early success on the field was reflected by the clubs place at the top of the table midway through the season. But contract issues with captain Michael Monaghan coincided with a drop in form, including a record loss of the club against Cronulla, 68–6. Winning their final round game, Manly secured eighth spot, but were quickly dispatched from the finals in the first week with a 46–22 loss to Parramatta.

In January 2006, the new Manly Warringah Board unanimously approve Penn Sport to purchase the majority of the outstanding shares in the club. This reshuffle saw both Delmege and Penn Sports each own just under 40% of the club, with the remainder held by the Manly Football Club. The intention of both majority owners was to see the Football Club further improve their finances, with the aim of the Football Club eventually buying back the privately held shares.

The new board grew to nine, with the addition of two directors appointed by Penn Sports.

"We’re fortunate to have two partners who are willing to invest in the long term future of Manly and are absolutely, passionately committed to its success. The loyalty of Max Delmege to the club speaks for itself and the Penn family are life long fans and passionate supporters of the Sea Eagles. Penn Sport also has a depth of experience in sponsorship and sports management and will add value to the club and be of enormous advantage in moving the club forward". Paul Cummings, MWSE Board CEO.

The club further boosted its roster for the 2006, with the signings of Orford and centre Steve Bell from Melbourne. The club overcome a slow start to finish the regular season fifth and a match against the Newcastle Knights in the first week of finals. Despite an early lead, the Sea Eagles were run down in a physical encounter, eventually losing 25–18. The following week, Manly struggled for any impact against the St. George Illawarra Dragons, losing 28–0 to finish their tilt at the premiership.

Until September 2006, the Manly-Warringah Football Club had bought back 150,000 additional shares from MWSE Limited. Monies generated by Football Club come from memberships and other fund raising activities. Memberships to the MWSE Limited supporters club (Screaming Eagles) do not provide the Football Club with further monies.

A restructure of the MWSE Limited Board saw the Manly Leagues Club lose one director, and Scott Penn resume the Chairman duties.

The 2007 NRL season saw the club maintain a stable playing roster for the first time since the success of the mid-1990s, and on the back of a strong defensive platform, finished the regular season second place behind the Melbourne Storm. With their first top four finish in the NRL, the club hosted their first ever final at Brookvale Oval, against South Sydney Rabbitohs which resulted in an easy 30–6 victory and a week off. In the qualifying final against North Queensland Cowboys, a dominant second half saw the team win 28-6 and earn a place in the Grand Final against minor premiers Melbourne Storm. After a physical opening, Manly soon ran out of steam and were well beaten 8-34.

In mapping out Manly's future in 2003, Des Hasler and his coaching staff believed that the successful implementation of a 5-year plan would set the club up for a premiership for the 2008 season. In making the 2007 decider, many within the club stated that it was a year earlier than expected, but after the horror loss, they turned their eyes to the 2008 as the premiership year.

The season started off rocky with the club dropping their first two games, prompting many commentators to question the clubs ability to backup, particularly with the loss of Michael Monaghan to the ESL. Slowly, the club returned to form and by mid-season were again in a race for the minor premiership. It was not until the final game of the NRL season when the minor premiership was decided, with Melbourne requiring a 26-point win to claim it from Manly, on for-and-against. They easily did this, relegating Manly to second with Cronulla coming third on the same number of points but a significantly lower for-and against record.

In the build-up to the first week of the finals, halfback Matt Orford won the Dally M Medal, beating out Melbourne Storm stars Billy Slater and Cameron Smith. On the back of this recognition, Orford led Manly to a comprehensive 38–6 victory over the St. George Illawarra Dragons in the Qualifying Final at Brookvale Oval, earning the side a two-week rest and a home Preliminary Final at the Sydney Football Stadium. Another strong victory, this time a 32–6 win over the New Zealand Warriors, ensured a rematch of the 2007 NRL Grand Final against the Melbourne Storm.

In the week leading up to the 2008 Grand Final, the MWSE CEO Grant Mayer, used the publicity to press for further sponsorship opportunities, including a likely replacement of major sponsor Delmege. This action appears to be the catalyst for the subsequent long-running board room fracture, with the Board split on many 'front office' issues including the extension of contracts for coach Des Hasler, media manager Peter Peters and Board CEO Grant Mayer, infighting played out through the media by both factions, and a deal to purchase the Leagues Club jointly by the Penns and Delmege falling through.

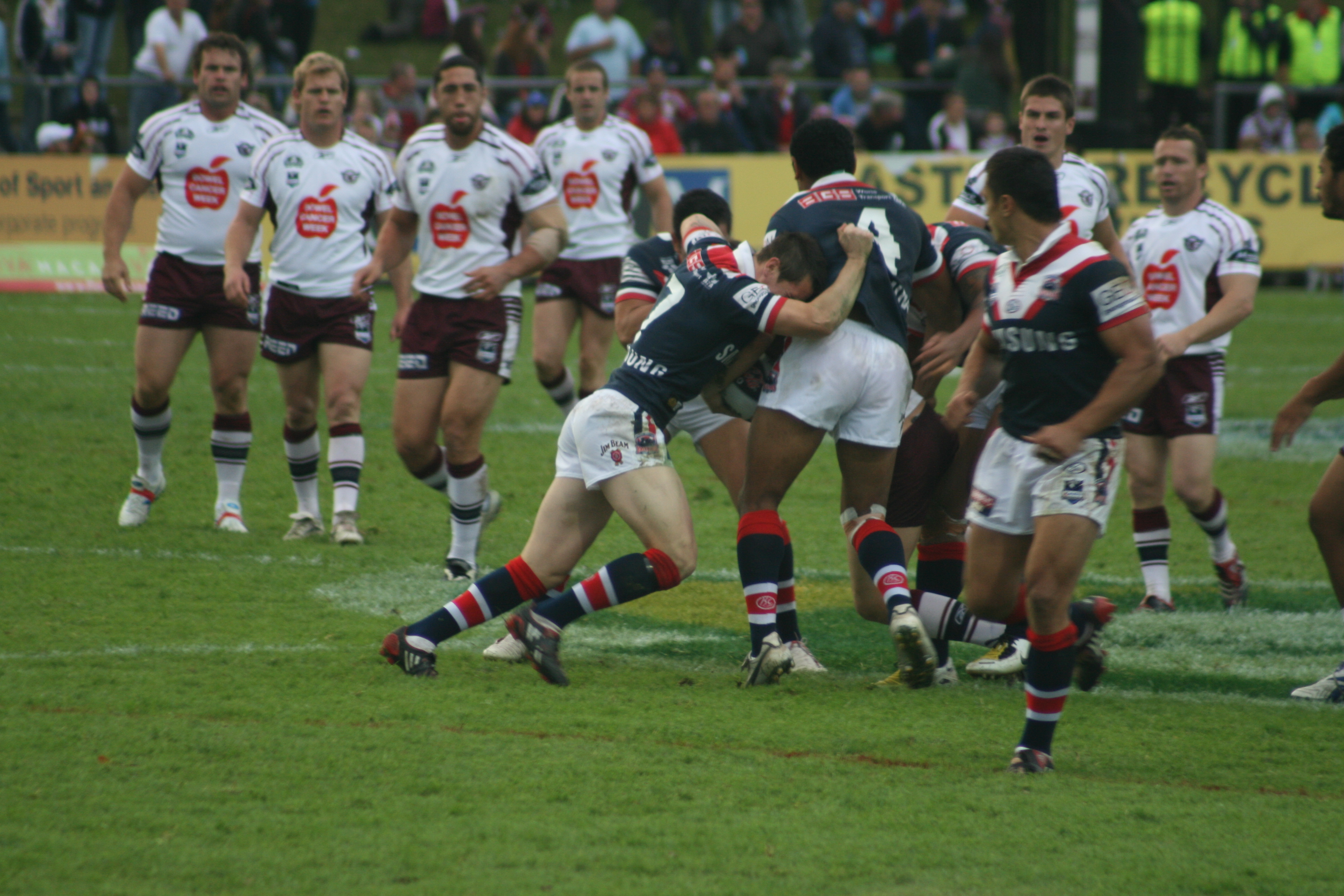
Sydney Roosters in action against the Manly Sea Eagles at Brookvale Oval in June 2008

On the back of strong on-field results and the turmoil which played around the Melbourne club during the finals series, including the loss of captain Cameron Smith (suspended) and Ryan Hoffman (injury), Manly entered the decider as slight favourites. The first half featured a disciplined performance by Manly, with Melbourne finding themselves on the wrong end of both field position and possession, and unable to apply any significant pressure. Manly led 8–0 at the break, but with the groundwork done in the first half, went on a six try, second half scoring spree to run out winners 40–0. Highlights of the result were a hat-trick of tries to winger Michael Robertson and a try each to Steve Menzies and Steven Bell in their final game for the Manly club.

- 2008, 6 October

Manly Warringah Sea Eagles: Brett Stewart, Michael Robertson, Steven Bell, Steve Matai, David Williams, Jamie Lyon, Matt Orford ©, Brent Kite, Matt Ballin, Josh Perry, Anthony Watmough, Glenn Hall, Glenn Stewart.

Interchange: Heath L'Estrange, Mark Bryant, Jason King, Steve Menzies.

Coach: Des Hasler.

Manly Warringah Sea Eagles – 40 (Robertson 3, Ballin, Kite, Williams, Menzies, Bell tries; Matai 2, Lyon 2 goals)
defeated
Melbourne Storm – 0

As of December 2008, there are three current shareholders in "Manly-Warringah Sea Eagles Limited" which are the Manly-Warringah Football Club Ltd (16.97%), Delmege (Surfside) (41.515%) and Penn Sport Pty Ltd (41.515%).

The Manly-Warringah Rugby League Football Club Limited has no shareholders. This is the membership based company which Football Club members and Life Members belong to and owns 16.97% of the shares, and one Preference Share, in Manly-Warringah Sea Eagles Limited.

Importantly, this preference share gives the members control of the Manly Sea Eagles name, colours and emblem as well as control over the home ground location.

The third entity is the Manly Warringah Rugby Leagues Club which operates the Manly-Warringah Leagues Club based in Brookvale and is independent of the Football Club operations. The Leagues Club provides support for the Manly-Warringah District Junior Rugby League.

They then earned bragging rights as the best team of the year when they defeated Leeds in the 2009 World Club Challenge.

Despite many attempts to find compromise, Grant Mayer eventually announced his standing down from his position from mid-July 2009, three months before the end of his contract. Although the board required 75% support for any motion, Mayer stated that the situation had become unworkable and would leave. In further efforts for peace, Max Delmege, Rick Penn and Phil Dean (Football Club) all stood down from the MWSE Board, to be replaced Jack Elsegood, Kerry Chrysiliou and Melinda Gainsford-Taylor.

== Crest & Colours ==
Various changes to the jersey were introduced at irregular intervals. As well as the classic 'V' design, the club has broken up the maroon jersey with hoops, bars, large eagles, player numbers, stripes, double stripes, top and bottoms, collars, no collars, reversed colours and even the use of blue.

During the 2007 pre-season, the club introduced a limited number of green jerseys for a trial match against the Melbourne Storm.

== Rivalries ==
The Manly Sea Eagles have developed some rivalries since 1947. Some of them include:

- North Sydney – The first, and most obvious, was the local derby's between North Sydney. As well as taking many of North's playing stock due to the residential rule imposed at the time, Manly had bought further stars from the North Sydney club including Ken Irvine, Cliff Lyons and Martin Bella. Even the fact that North Sydney are not longer competing in the top league, has fueled this rivalry, with many Bears supporters believing that Manly systematically pushed the North Sydney element out of the Northern Eagles joint-venture.
- Parramatta Eels – Another rivalry was with fellow debutants from 1947, Parramatta. Not much was made of their clashes until the mid 1970s, and in particular the 1976 Grand Final in which Manly denied the Parramatta club a maiden premiership. Further clashes through to the mid 1980s, including Manly's 1982 and 1983 Grand Final losses to the Eels, cemented a fierce rivalry between many of the clubs' supporters.
- South Sydney Rabbitohs – There was a small rivalry between these two clubs from 1947 to 1971, as along with the St. George Dragons, they were the powerhouses of the time and they played each other in the 1951, 1968 and 1970 Grand Finals. From 1972, the rivalry became bigger, as due to the abolishment of the rule where players could not freely negotiate with other clubs, the Sea Eagles signed many of South Sydney's stars, including Ray Branighan and John O'Neill in 1972, Tom Mooney in 1975, Ian Roberts in 1990, Mark Carroll in 1993 and more recently Dylan Walker in 2016. Conversely, Manly also lost some players to the Rabbitohs including Phil Blake in 1987 and Glenn Stewart in 2015.
- Western Suburbs Magpies – Also during this time, the clashes between Western Suburbs Magpies and Manly were billed as a battle between the "Silvertails" and the "Fibros". This distinction between perceived classes of people fuelled many tough matches between the clubs, particularly after Manly would secure top players from the Magpies such as John Dorahy, Les Boyd, David Gillespie. The Silvertails and Fibros monikers first appeared in stories written by reporter Chris Masters, in the late 1970s. Chris was the brother of the then Wests coach, Roy Masters.
- Cronulla Sharks – This rivalry has been dubbed the "Battle of the Beaches", due to the geographical locations of the two clubs. Manly played the Sharks in two grand finals: 1973 and 1978, which are renowned for being the most brutal in history. Manly won both of these deciders, 10–7 in 1973 and 16–0 in the 1978 replay after the first game ended at 11-all. The Sea Eagles have traditionally had much success over the Sharks, with Cronulla winning at Manly's home ground just five times in their history. However the Sharks' biggest ever win came against Manly, a 68-6 thrashing in 2005. Cronulla and Manly play for the Steve Rogers Trophy when the two clubs meet in the NRL premiership each season. Most recently the two teams met in the 2013 finals, when Manly held off Cronulla by 24–18.
- Newcastle Knights – Since the mid-1990s, Manly has also built a rivalry with the Newcastle Knights club. In many ways this mirrors the Manly/Wests clashes where class distinction is used to fuel the perceived underdogs, in this case the working class city of Newcastle. In 1997, both Manly and Newcastle fought out the decider, with Newcastle winning 22–16. Newcastle's coach in 1997 was 1972 and 1973 Manly premiership winner Mal Reilly. Manly's coach Bob Fulton was a teammate of Reilly's in those premiership wins. Recently, in the 10 August 2007 match to commemorate the 1997 grand final Manly took revenge, thumping the knights 50–16.
- Melbourne Storm – Manly have recently built up a rivalry with the Melbourne Storm club. Over the last few years they have had very close games, they have been the top two teams in the premiership, and they have played each other in the 2007 and 2008 NRL Grand Finals. The Sea Eagles and Storm were also involved in the infamous Battle of Brookvale match in Round 25 of the 2011 season which saw all-in brawls, 2 players sent off and 6 players (5 from Manly) receiving an accumulated total of 13 weeks worth of suspensions.

== Stadium ==
Home games are played at Brookvale Oval, which has a capacity of 23,000.

When Manly-Warringah was admitted into the competition and over its first seasons it was desirous of obtaining use of Manly Oval as their home ground, however the lease of the ground from Manly Council was held by Manly rugby union club who refused to grant any match days to rugby league. The head-quarters of the Manly-Warringah Junior Rugby League (the body who successfully secured the club's 1947 admission to first grade) had since at least 1939 been Brookvale Oval. The Sea Eagles home games were as a result in 1947 played at Brookvale Oval and the club has remained there ever since.

Most development on the site had occurred between 1965 and 1980, with the latest additions being the Ken Arthurson Stand which opened in 1995 and an extension of the Jane Try Stand in 2014.

There is much conjecture on what the future development of the ground will include. As one of the few grounds to still have a substantial grassed hill area, many supporters believe that future plans must retain this unique feature.

The largest attendance for a Rugby League match at Brookvale Oval was 27,655 during the final round clash of the 1986 season, between Manly and Parramatta. Highest average crowd for a season was 15,484 over 11 games, in the 2006 season.

In total, Brookvale Oval has seen over five and half million spectators since 1947.

== Premierships and Titles ==
Manly Warringah Sea Eagles
Premiership Titles	1972, 1973, 1976, 1978, 1987, 1996, 2008, 2011 (8)
Premiership Runners-Up	1951, 1957, 1959, 1968, 1970, 1982, 1983, 1995, 1997, 2007, 2013 (11)
Minor Premiership Titles	1971, 1972, 1973, 1976, 1983, 1987, 1995, 1996, 1997 (9)
Pre-Season Cup	1980
Sevens Tournaments	1990, 1994, 1995 (3)
Reserve Grade Titles	1954, 1960, 1969, 1973, 1988 (5)
Jersey Flegg Cup Titles	1961, 1974, 1987 (3)
Third Grade Titles	1952 (1)
Presidents Cup	1946, 1970 (2)
KG Cup	1982, 1983 (2)
S.G. Ball Cup	Nil
Harold Matthews Cup	2018, 2021 (2)
Club Championships	1972, 1983, 1987, 1988 (4)
First Grade Wooden Spoons	Nil

== Player records ==
Manly Warringah Sea Eagles
Most 1st Grade Games	Steve Menzies - 349 (includes 69 for Northern Eagles)
	Cliff Lyons - 309
Most Points - Career	Graham Eadie - 1,917 (71 Tries, 847 Goals, 3 Field Goals)
	Jamie Lyon - 1,294 (82 tries, 483 goals)
Most Tries - Career	Steve Menzies - 180 (includes 29 for Northern Eagles)
Most Tries - Career	Brett Stewart - 163
	Bob Fulton - 105
Most Points - Season	Matthew Ridge - 257 (1995)
Most Tries (Back) - Season	Phil Blake - 27 (1983)
Most Tries (Forward) - Season	Steve Menzies - 22 (1995)

== Club records ==
Manly Warringah Sea Eagles
Effective 4 July 2009
Biggest Win	70-7 vs Penrith (1973)
	61-0 vs St George (1994)
Biggest Loss	6-68 vs Cronulla (2005)
	12-72 vs Penrith (2004)
Consecutive Wins	15 - (1995)
	12 - (1997)
Consecutive Losses	8 - (1950 / 1998-99)
Best Winning Percentage (10+ Games)	Gold Coast Chargers - Played 17 / Won 14 (85%)
	Illawarra - Played 27 / Won 19 (74%)
Worst Winning Percentage (10+ Games)	St. George Illawarra Dragons - Played 14 / Won 4 (28%)
	Melbourne Storm - Played 17 / Won 7 (41%)
Clubs (Most Wins Against)	Parramatta - 76
	Eastern Suburbs - 75
Clubs (Most Losses To)	South Sydney - 56
	St George - 55
Brookvale Oval Record	Played 573 - (W) 401 / (L) 158 / (D) 14

== Honours and awards ==
=== Media and Association Awards ===
Manly Warringah Sea Eagles
Rugby League Immortal	Bob Fulton (1985 – Original Inductee)
ARL Hall of Fame	Ken Irvine and Bob Fulton
Rothmans Medal	Graham Eadie (1974) and Mal Cochrane (1986)
Dally M Awards	
Player of the Year	Cliff Lyons (1990 and 1994), Matt Orford (2008)
Silver Dally M	Ian Roberts (1993) and Cliff Lyons (1995)
Best Fullback	Matthew Ridge (1995)
Best Center	Jamie Lyon (2011)
Best Five-Eight	Cliff Lyons (1994)
Best Halfback	Matt Orford (2008)
Best Lock Forward	Ben Kennedy (2005 and 2006)
Best Second Rower	Steve Menzies (1994 and 1995), Anthony Watmough (2007 and 2009), Glenn Stewart (2008)
Best Hooker	Jim Serdaris (1996)
Best Prop Forward	Ian Roberts (1993 and 1994)
Top Try-Scorer	Steve Menzies (1995), Brett Stewart (2008)
Top Points Scorer	Matthew Ridge (1995)
Rookie of the Year	Phil Blake (1982), Jack Elsegood (1993), Steve Menzies (1994), Daly Cherry-Evans (2011)
Captain of the Year	Ben Kennedy (2006)
Clive Churchill Medal	Cliff Lyons (1987), Geoff Toovey (1996), Brent Kite (2008), Glenn Stewart (2011), Daly Cherry-Evans (2013)
RLW Players of the Year	John Mayes (1973), Bob Fulton (1975), Phil Sigsworth (1983) and Cliff Lyons (1994)
Norwich Rising Star – Rookie of the Year	Jack Elsegood (1993) and John Hopoate (1995)
Rugby League Players Association	
Player of the Year	Ben Kennedy (2006)
Rookie of the Year	David Williams (2008)
Best Country Player	Brent Kite (2006)
Clubman of the Year	Jason King (2008)
Rugby League International Federation	
Coach of the Year	Des Hasler (2008)
New Zealand Player of the Year	Darrell Williams (1989)
NSW Player of the Year	Roy Bull (1954) and Bob Fulton (1972 and 1973)
Sun Herald Best and Fairest	Rex Mossop (1958) and Dennis Ward (1968)
Ken Stephen Memorial Award	Ian Roberts (1994) and Michael Monaghan (2006)

=== Club honours ===
Manly Warringah Sea Eagles
Clubman of the Year	Owen Cunningham (1994), Cliff Lyons (1995), Des Hasler (1996), Geoff Toovey (1997), Craig Hancock (1998), Steve Menzies (1999 and 2002), Warwick Bulmer (non-player)(2000), Chad Randall (2003), Albert Torrens (2004), Luke Williamson (2005), Chris Hicks (2006), Michael Monaghan (2007), Mark Bryant (2008), Greg Alexander (non-player/runner) (2009).
Best and Fairest	Steve Menzies (2002), Chris Hicks (2004), Ben Kennedy (2005 and 2006), Glenn Stewart (2007 and 2008), Jason King (2009).
Players' Player	John Hopoate (2002), Ben Kennedy (2005), Brent Kite (2006), Brett Stewart (2007), Brent Kite (2008), George Rose (2009).
Rookie of the Year	Jason King (2002), Steve Matai (2005), Travis Burns (2006), Michael Bani (2007), David Williams (2008), Kieran Foran (2009).
Members Best and Fairest	Ben Kennedy (2005 and 2006), Anthony Watmough & Brett Stewart (2007), Matt Orford (2008), Anthony Watmough (2009).
U20s Players Player	Kieran Foran (2008), Darcy Lussick (2009).
U20s Best and Fairest	Jared Waerea-Hargreaves (2008), Jamie Buhrer (2009).

=== Centenary honours ===
Manly Warringah Sea Eagles
Team of the Century	Ken Irvine (Wing), Bob Fulton (Reserve)
100 Greatest Players	Kerry Boustead, Roy Bull, Graham Eadie, Bob Fulton, Ken Irvine, John O'Neill
NSWRL Team of the Century	Ken Irvine (Wing), Bob Fulton (5/8), Roy Bull (Reserve)
Indigenous Team of the Century	Dale Shearer (Wing), Cliff Lyons (Lock)
Secondary Schools Centenary Team	Steve Menzies (2nd Row), Les Boyd (Front Row)
Men of League - Centenary of Club Greats	Bob Fulton, Cliff Lyons, Steve Menzies, Malcolm "Mal" Reilly and Graham Eadie

== Representative Players ==
Below are the players to play representative football whilst in Manly colours. Notable Internationals to play for Manly, but not represent from the club, include New Zealanders Jock Butterfield, Trevor Kilkelly, Adrian Shelford and Tasesa Lavea, and Great British players Malcolm "Mal" Reilly, Phil Lowe, Kevin Ward and Andy Goodway.

Manly Warringah Sea Eagles
Australian Test Players	**68** – Martin Bella, Johnny Bliss, Kerry Boustead, Les Boyd, Bill Bradstreet, Dave Brown, Ray Brown, Roy Bull, Peter Burke, Mark Carroll, Daly Cherry-Evans, Noel Cleal, Chris Close, Phil Daley, Bill Delamare, Graham Eadie, Bob Fulton, Daniel Gartner, Russel Gartner, Geoff Gerard, Johnny Gibbs, David Gillespie, Bill Hamilton, Les Hanigan, Des Hasler, Terry Hill, John Hopoate, Fred Jones, Ben Kennedy, Brent Kite, Nik Kosef, Max Krilich, Jack Lumsden, Jamie Lyon, Cliff Lyons, John McDonald, Paul McCabe, Steve Martin, Steve Menzies, Danny Moore, John Morgan, Rex Mossop, Wally O'Connell, Michael O'Connor, John O'Neill, Josh Perry, Terry Randall, John Ribot, Ray Ritchie, Ian Roberts, Kevin Schubert, Dale Shearer, Jack Sinclair, Frank Stanton, Brett Stewart, Glenn Stewart, Alan Thompson, Ian Thomson, Geoff Toovey, Paul Vautin, Mick Veivers, Bruce Walker, Dennis Ward, Anthony Watmough, David Williams, Gordon Willoughby and Nick Yakich.
Australian Captains	**2** – Max Krilich and Geoff Toovey
New Zealand Test Players	**8** – Darrell Williams, Kevin Iro, Tony Iro, Matthew Ridge, Gene Ngamu, Steve Matai, Jared Waerea-Hargreaves and Kieran Foran.
Other Nations Test Players	**2** – Nick Bradley-Qalilawa (Fiji), Craig Innes (Rest of the World) and Michael Robertson (Scotland).
State of Origin (NSW)	**31** – Les Boyd, Ray Brown, Mark Carroll, Noel Cleal, Phil Daley, Graham Eadie, Geoff Gerard, David Gillespie, Craig Hancock, Des Hasler, Terry Hill, John Hopoate, Ben Kennedy, Brent Kite, Nik Kosef, Max Krilich, Jamie Lyon, Cliff Lyons, Steve Martin, Steve Menzies, Michael O'Connor, Josh Perry, Ian Roberts, Jim Serdaris, Phil Sigsworth, Brett Stewart, Glenn Stewart, Alan Thompson, Geoff Toovey, Anthony Watmough and David Williams.
State of Origin (QLD)	**14** – Steve Bell, Martin Bella, Kerry Boustead, Dave Brown, Daly Cherry-Evans, Chris Close, Owen Cunningham, Paul McCabe, Danny Moore, John Ribot, Dale Shearer, Neil Tierney, Paul Vautin and Bruce Walker.

Below are Manly players that have previously represented Australia at the schoolboys level. Players in bold went on to make their first grade debut for Manly Warringah.

Manly Warringah Sea Eagles
**Australian Schoolboys**	**15** – Les Boyd, Mark Bryant, **Mal Cochrane**, Luke Dorn, **Jack Elsegood**, **Solomon Haumono**, Daniel Heckenberg, Brent Kite, Heath L'Estrange, Jamie Lyon, **Steve Menzies**, Jamie Olejnik, Brendan Reeves, **David Ronson**, Ben Walker.

== See also ==
- National Rugby League
- Northern Eagles
