= 1983 NSWRFL season =

Rugby league competition

1983 New South Wales Rugby Football League
- Teams: 14
- Premiers: Parramatta (3rd title)
- Minor premiers: Manly-Warringah (5th title)
- Matches played: 189
- Points scored: 7,296
- Total attendance: 1,458,144
- Top points scorer: Michael Eden (256)
- Wooden spoon: Western Suburbs (12th spoon)
- Rothmans Medal: Michael Eden
- Top try-scorer: Phil Blake (27)

The 1983 NSWRFL season was the 76th season of professional rugby league football in Australia. Fourteen teams competed for the J J Giltinan Shield and Winfield Cup during the season, which culminated in a replay of the previous year's grand final between the Parramatta and Manly-Warringah clubs. During the season, NSWRFL teams also competed for the 1983 KB Cup.

1983 was the final season in the New South Wales Rugby Football League premiership for Sydney-based foundation club Newtown Jets, and the first reduction in the number of teams in the competition since Sydney University's departure at the end of the 1937 NSWRFL season. It was also the first season that was played with four-point tries.

== Season summary ==
For the first time, the number of points awarded for scoring a try was raised from three to four. There was also the introduction of a handover if a team was caught in possession six times, which had the effect of killing the traditional scrum but attracted many new followers to a game that had seen attendances decline by fifty percent since the record year of 1968. To counter a lucrative illegal betting market, legal betting via FootyTAB was introduced and was a regarded as a success.

Twenty-six regular season rounds were played from February till August, resulting in a top five of Manly-Warringah, Parramatta, Canterbury-Bankstown, Balmain and St. George, who battled it out in the finals. Manly-Warringah managed 23 wins from 28 matches in 1983 – at the time the most wins in a season by a club in NSWRFL premiership history alongside Parramatta's 23 in 1982.

The 1983 season's Rothmans Medallist was Eastern Suburbs’ back, Michael Eden and the Dally M Award went to Western Suburbs’ half, Terry Lamb. Rugby League Week gave their player of the year award to Manly-Warringah winger, Phil Sigsworth. This season the Coca-Cola Coach-of-the-year award was voted for by the coaches in the League and was awarded to rookie coach Laurie Freier.

This was also the last year in the first-grade competition for foundation club Newtown, who were dropped at the season's end.

The Round 2 game between Illawarra and Manly-Warringah at the Wollongong Showground was refereed by French Rugby League Federation referee Julien Rascagnères who had refereed the Ashes series during the 1982 Kangaroo tour.

=== Teams ===
The lineup of teams remained unchanged from the previous season, with fourteen clubs competing in total, including six Sydney-based foundation teams, another six from Sydney, one from greater New South Wales and one from the Australian Capital Territory. It was the last season for the Newtown club.

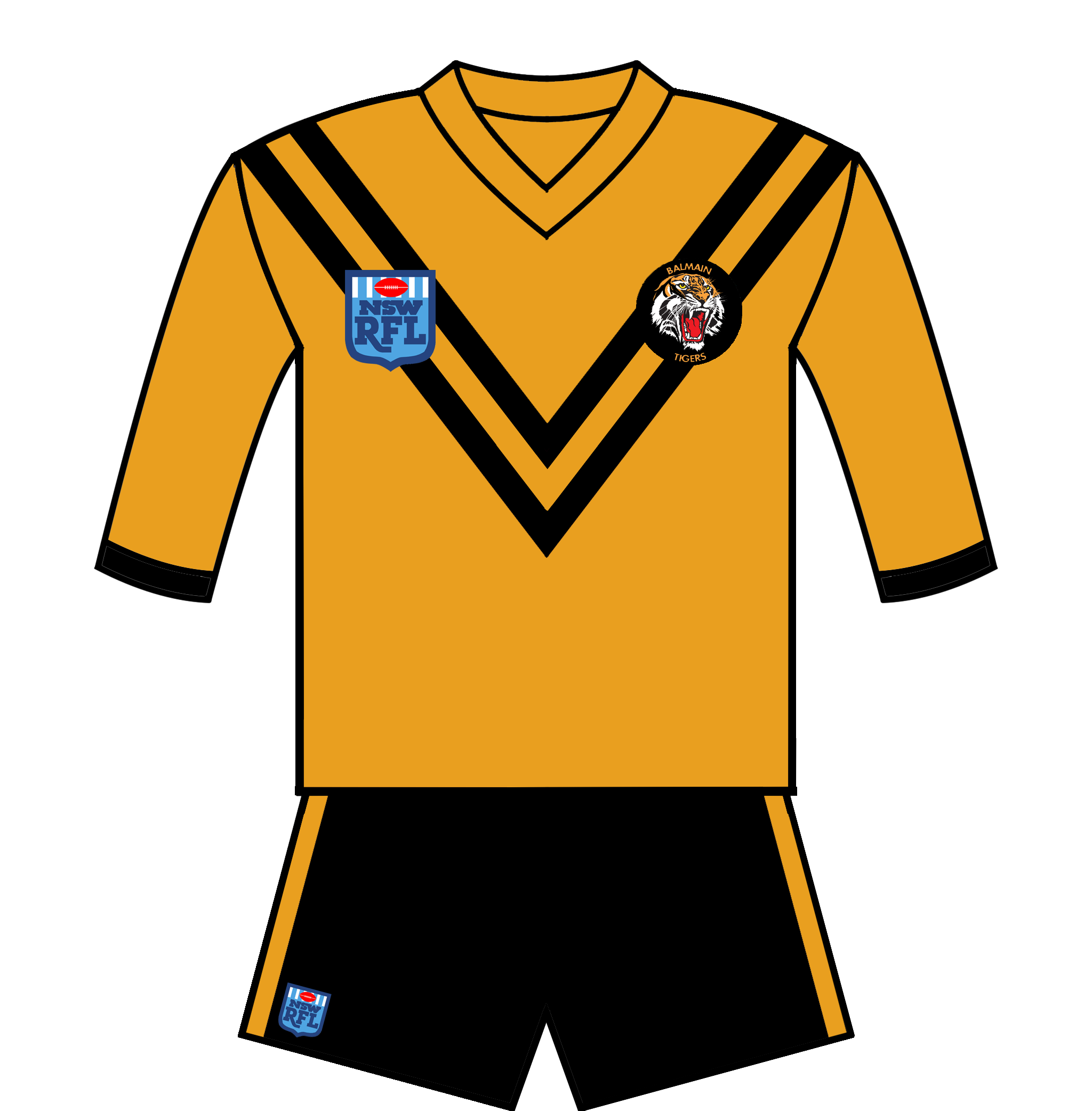
Balmain Tigers 76th season Ground: Leichhardt Oval; Coach: Frank Stanton; Captain: Wayne Pearce

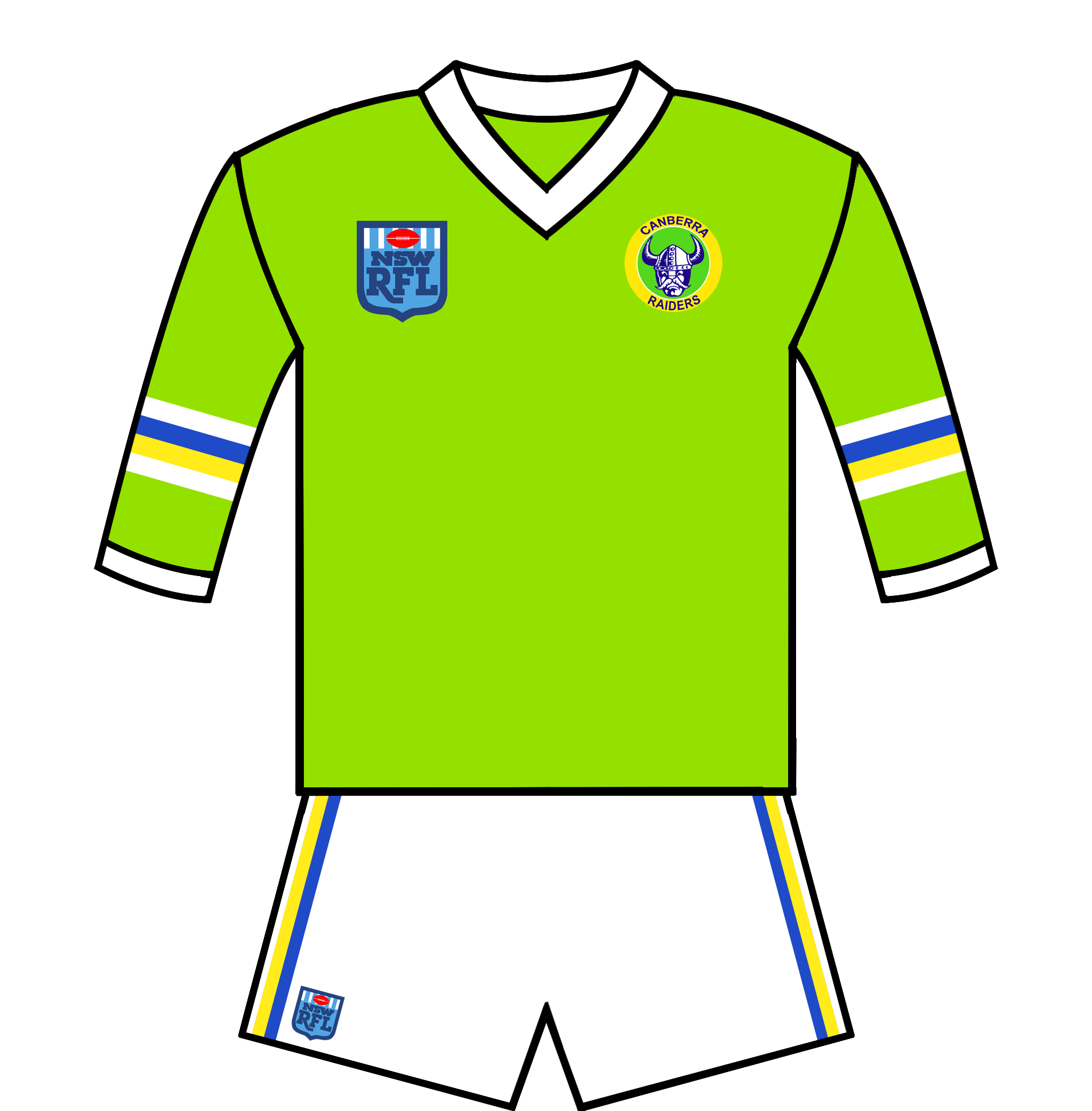
Canberra Raiders 2nd season Ground: Seiffert Oval; Coach: Don Furner; Captain: Allan McMahon

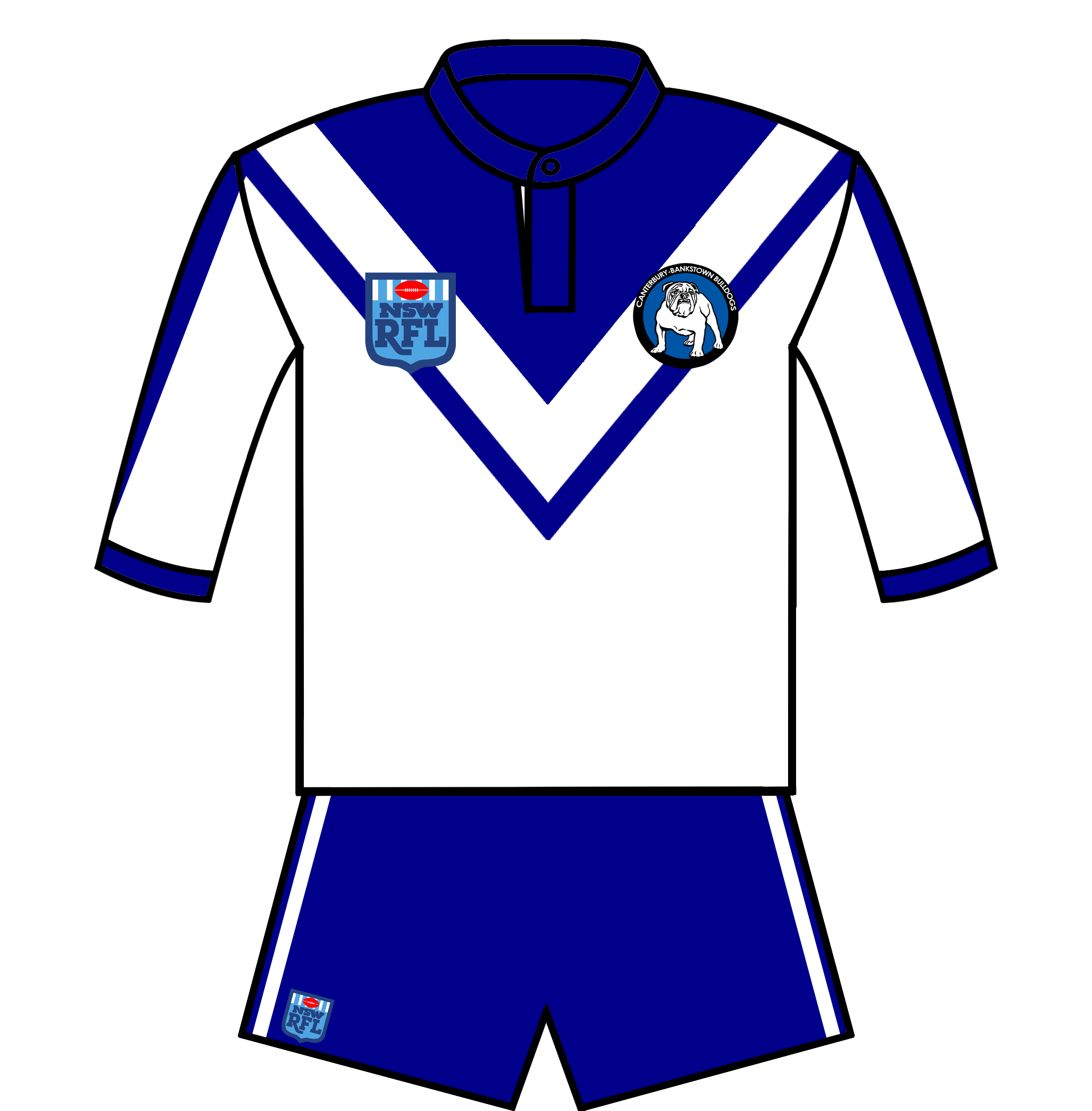
Canterbury Bulldogs 48th season Ground: Belmore Oval; Coach: Ted Glossop; Captain: Chris Anderson

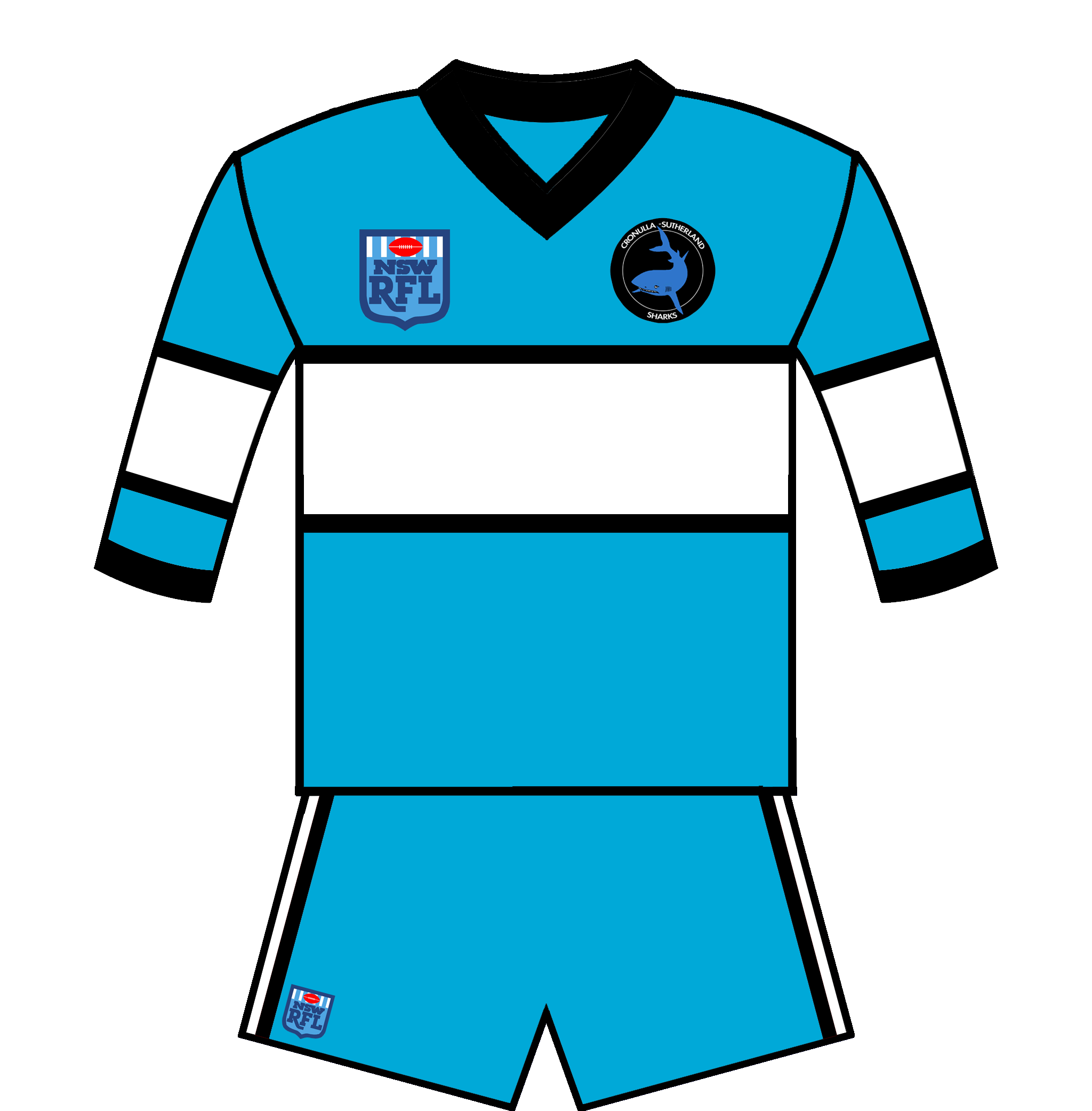
Cronulla Sharks 17th season Ground: Endeavour Field; Coach: Terry Fearnley; Captain: Gavin Miller

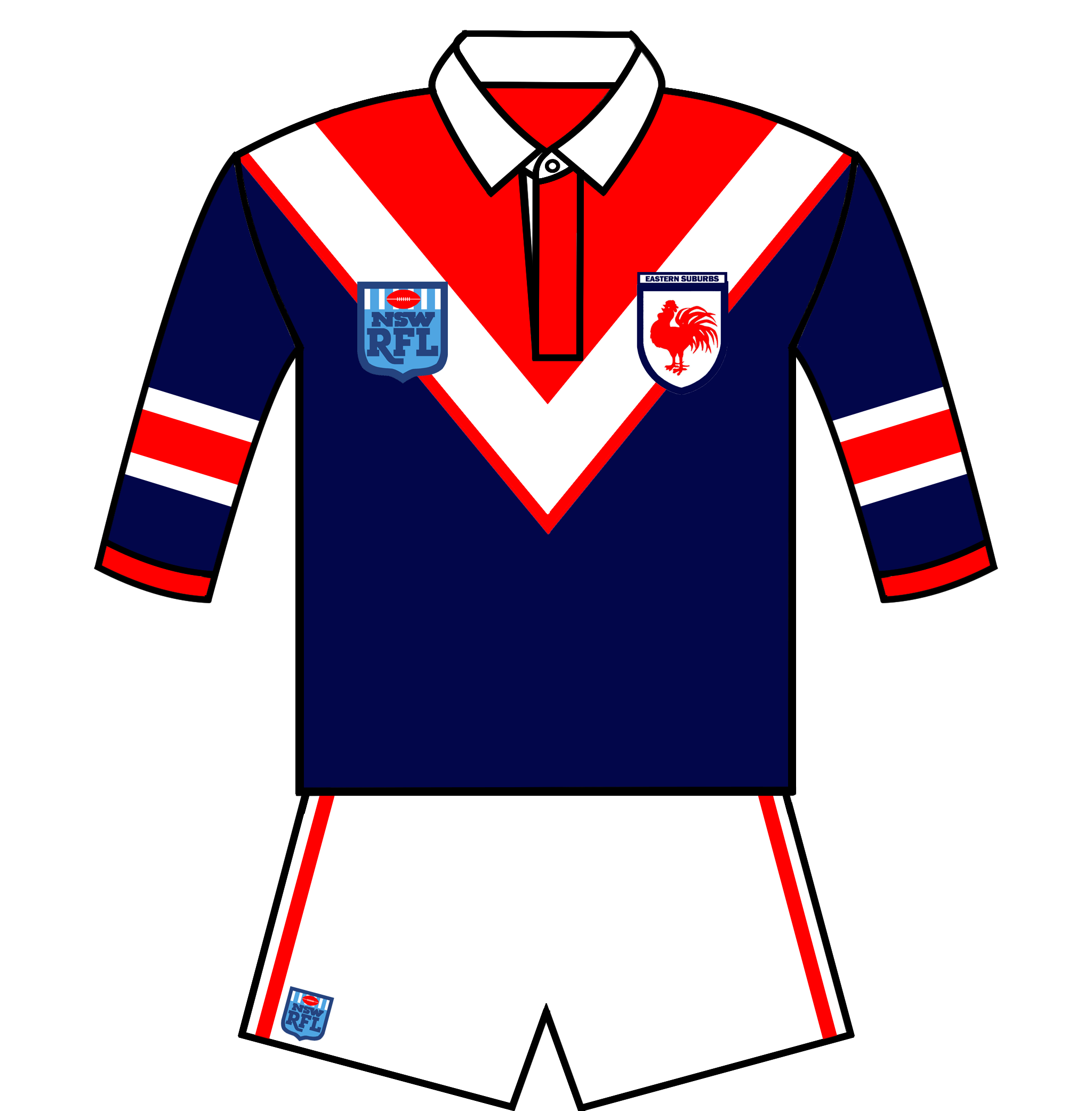
Eastern Suburbs Roosters 76th season Ground: Sydney Sports Ground; Coach: Laurie Freier; Captain: Royce Ayliffe

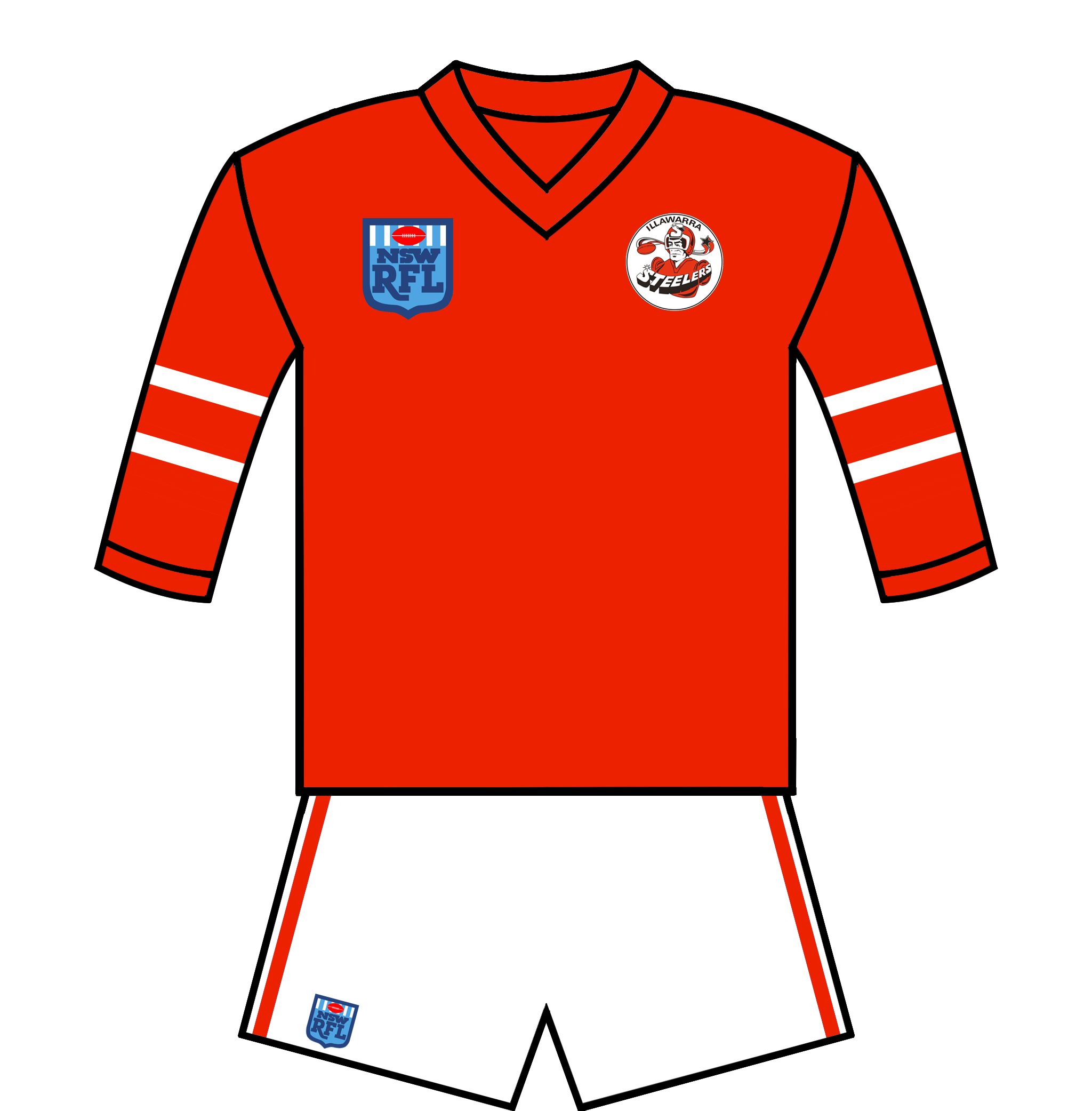
Illawarra Steelers 2nd season Ground: Wollongong Stadium; Coach: Allan Fitzgibbon; Captain: John Dorahy

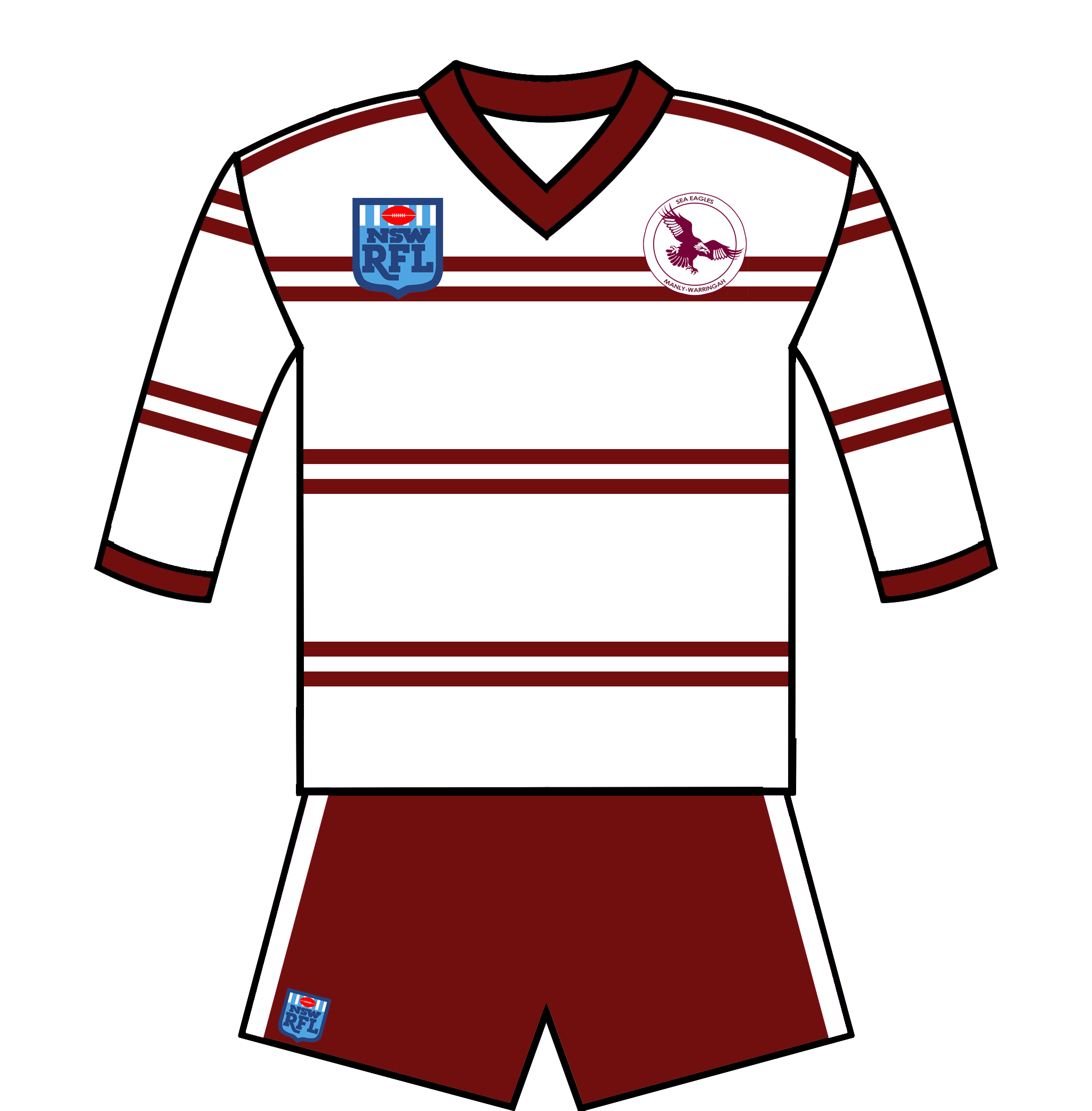
Manly-Warringah Sea Eagles 37th season Ground: Brookvale Oval; Coach: Bob Fulton; Captain: Max Krilich

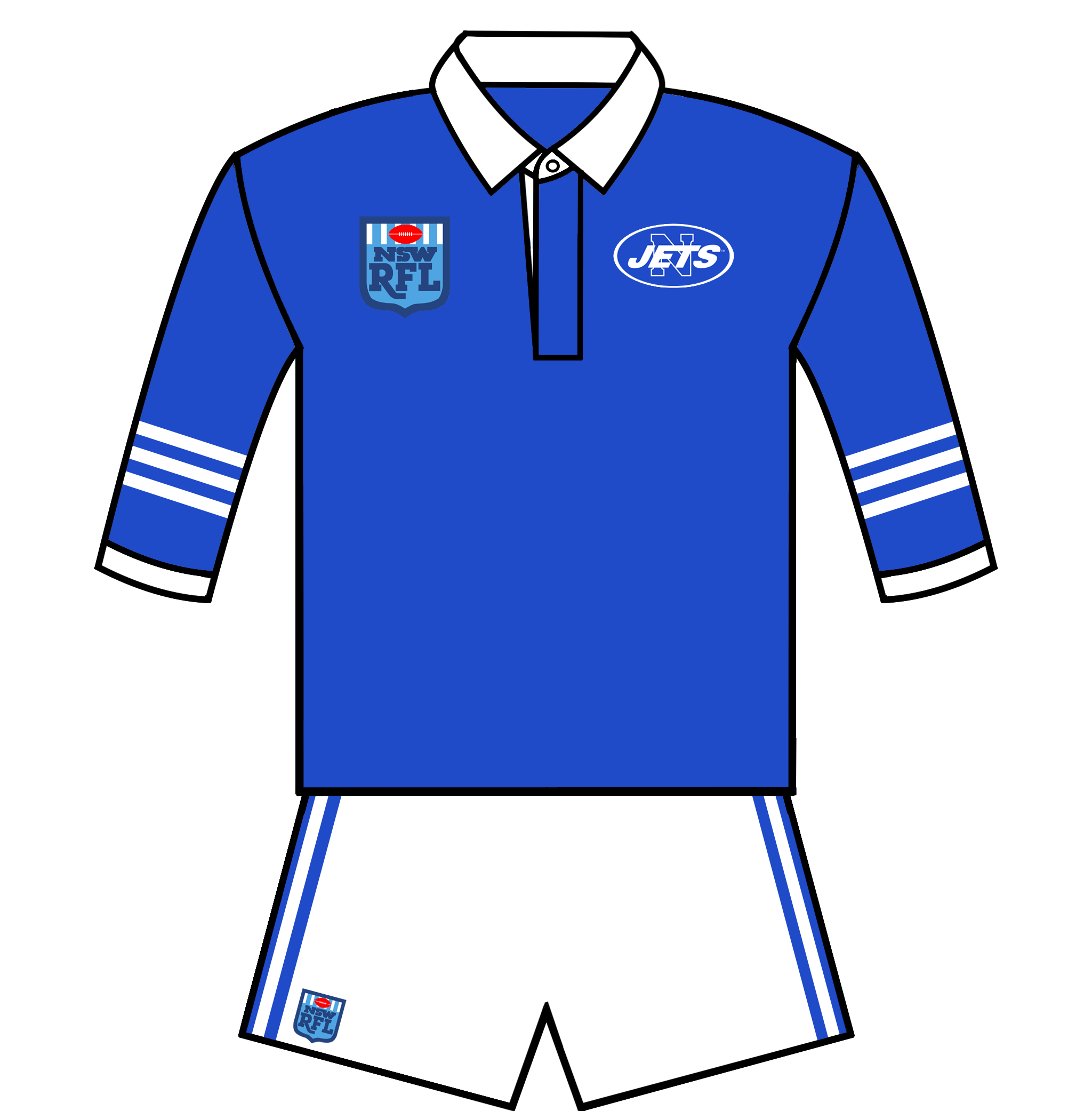
Newtown Jets 76th season Ground: Henson Park, Orana Park; Coach: Brian Moore; Captain: Ken Wilson, Dean Lance

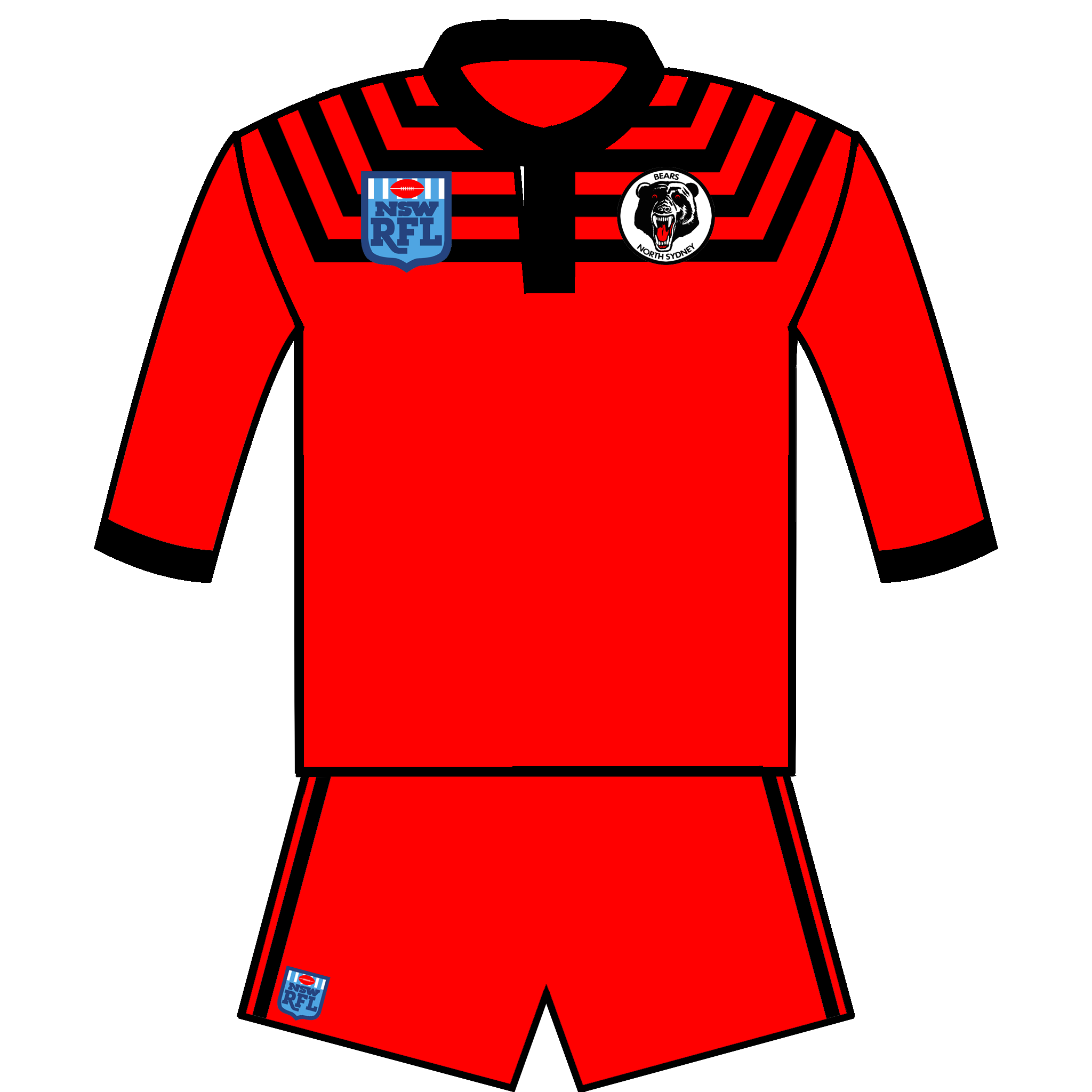
North Sydney Bears 76th season Ground: North Sydney Oval; Coach: John Hayes, Greg Hawick; Captain: Mark Graham, John Adam

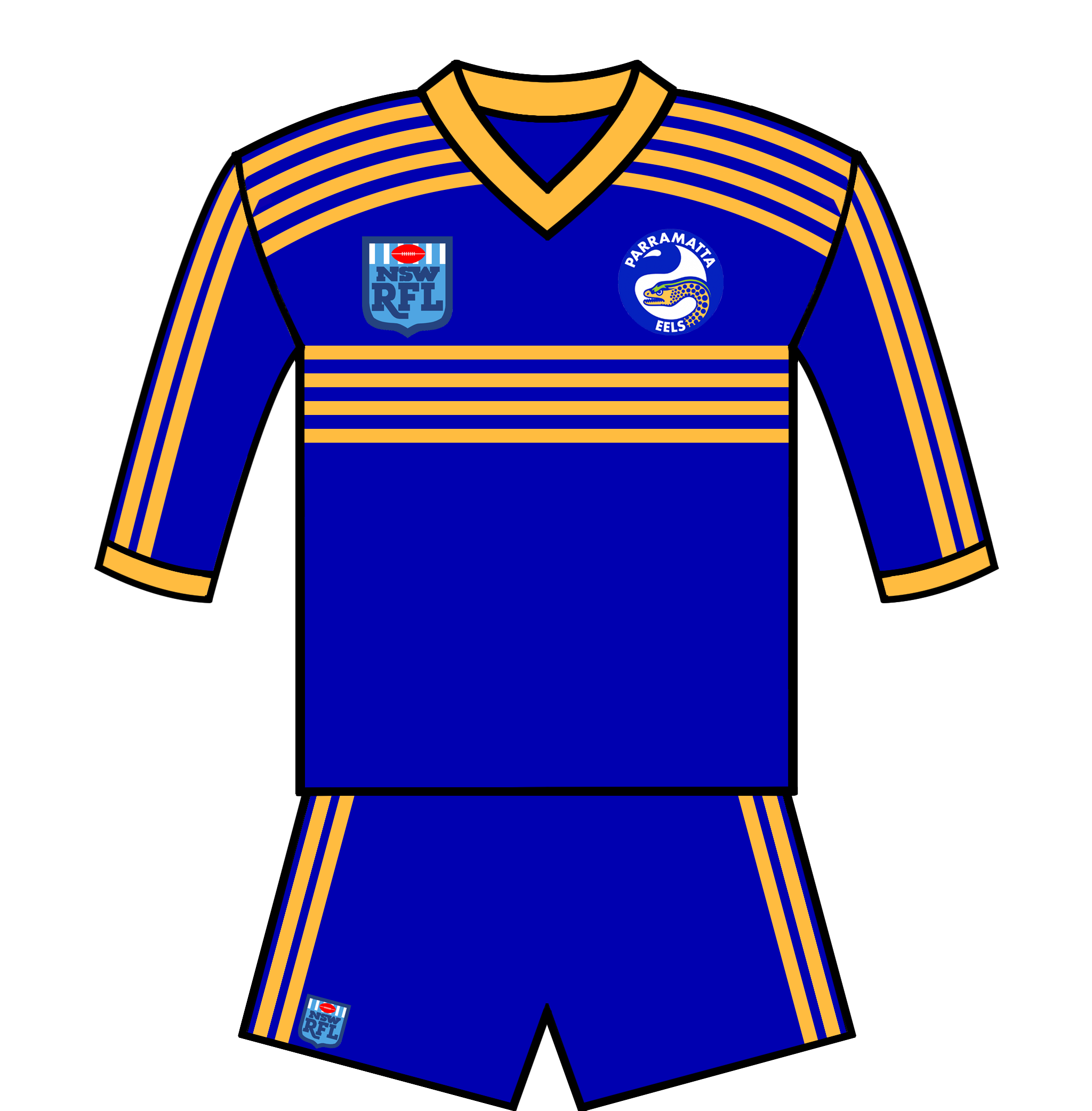
Parramatta Eels 37th season Ground: Belmore Oval; Coach: Jack Gibson; Captain: Steve Edge

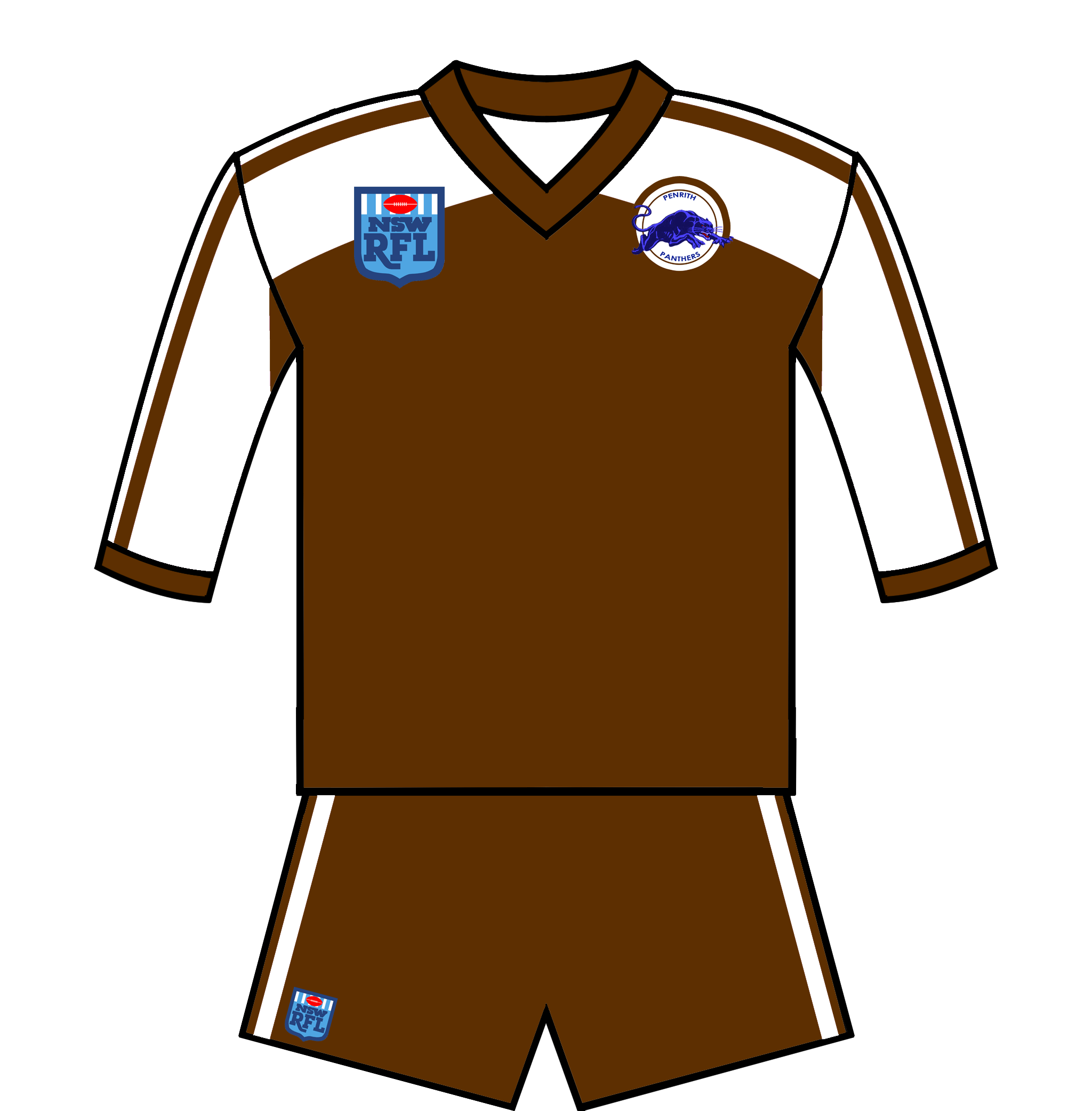
Penrith Panthers 17th season Ground: Penrith Stadium; Coach: John Peard; Captain: Royce Simmons

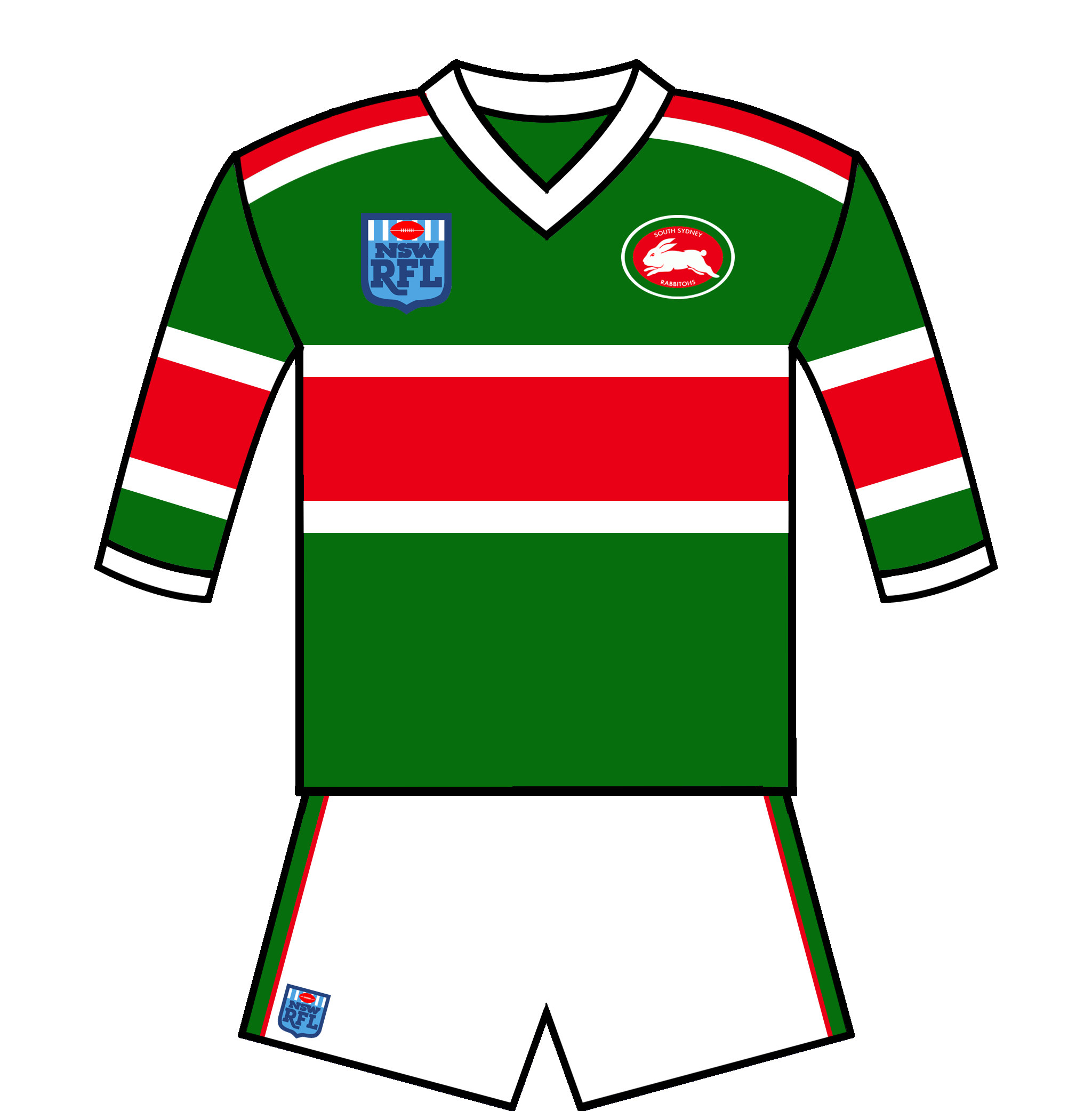
South Sydney Rabbitohs 76th season Ground: Redfern Oval; Coach: Ron Willey; Captain: Ziggy Niszczot

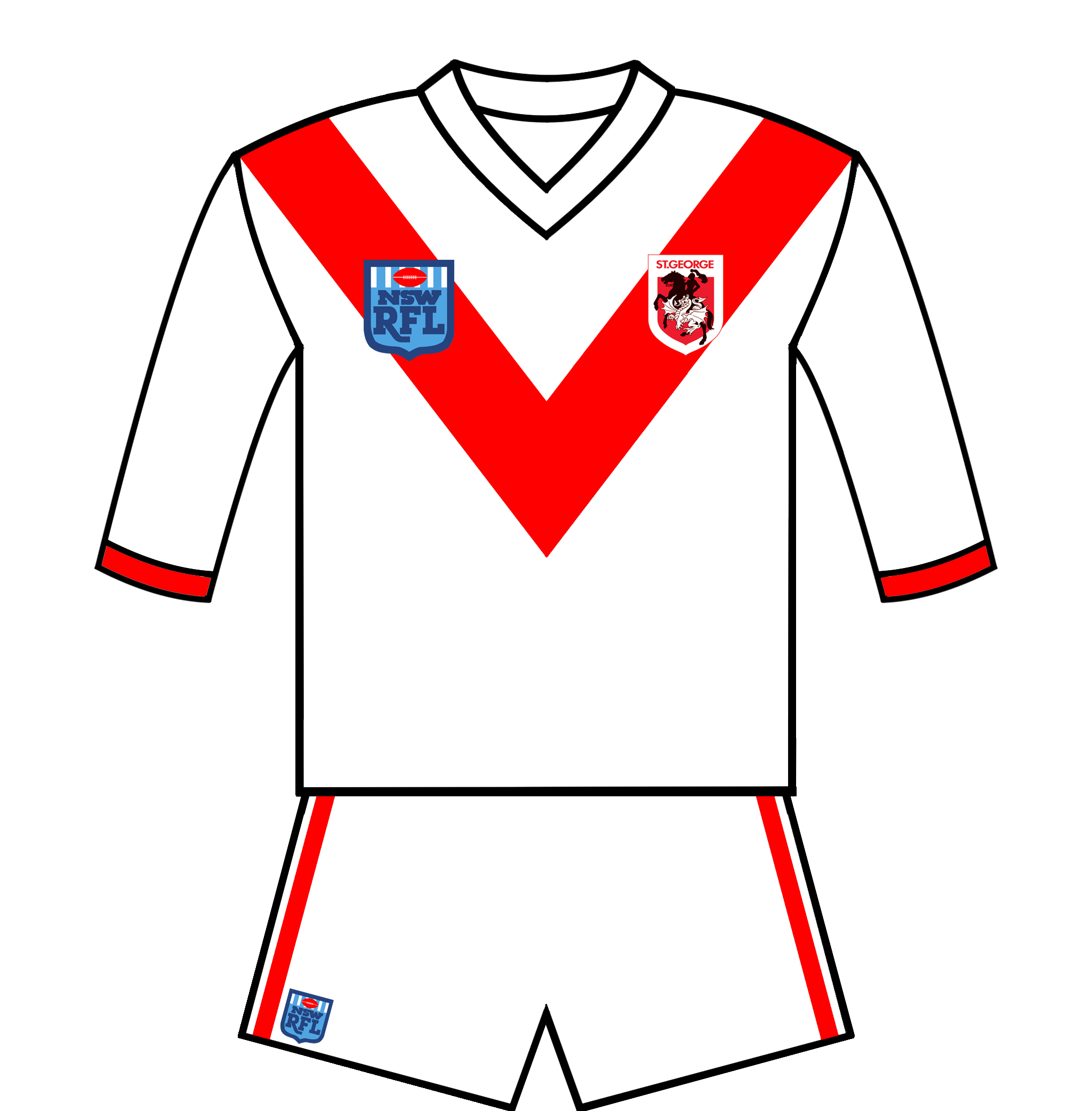
St. George Dragons 63rd season Ground: Kogarah Oval; Coach: Roy Masters; Captain: Craig Young, John Jansen

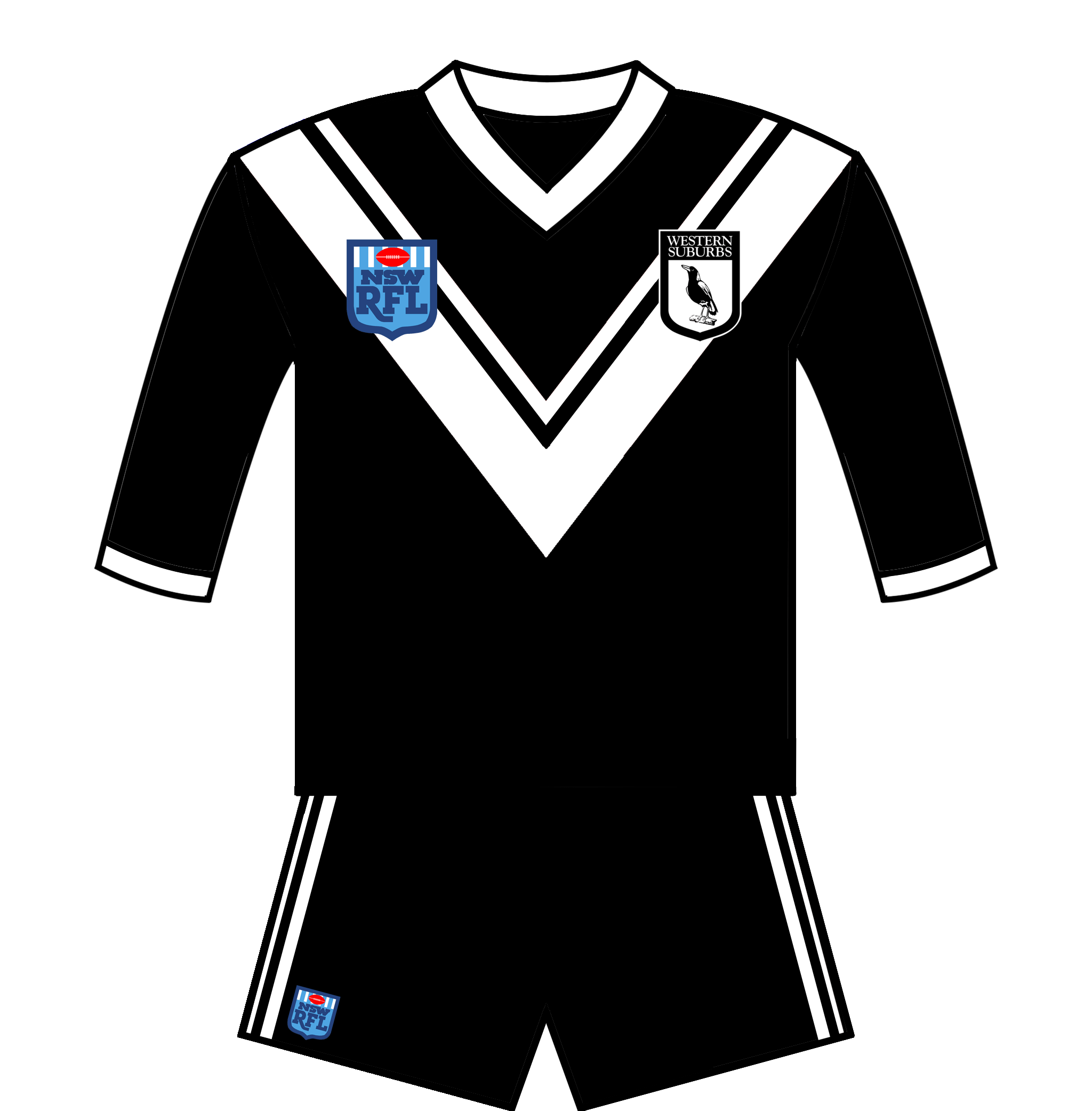
Western Suburbs Magpies 76th season Ground: Lidcombe Oval; Coach: Len Stacker; Captain: Warren Boland

=== Ladder ===
	Team	Pld	W	D	L	PF	PA	PD	Pts
1	Manly	26	22	0	4	690	361	+329	44
2	Parramatta	26	18	0	8	639	293	+346	36
3	Canterbury	26	18	0	8	531	409	+122	36
4	Balmain	26	17	0	9	525	438	+87	34
5	St. George	26	14	1	11	551	450	+101	29
6	Eastern Suburbs	26	14	1	11	579	492	+87	29
7	North Sydney	26	13	1	12	435	446	-11	27
8	South Sydney	26	12	1	13	439	495	-56	25
9	Cronulla	26	12	0	14	450	520	-70	24
10	Canberra	26	9	0	17	495	614	-119	18
11	Penrith	26	9	0	17	476	647	-171	18
12	Illawarra	26	8	0	18	451	644	-193	16
13	Newtown	26	7	2	17	373	591	-218	16
14	Western Suburbs	26	5	2	19	394	628	-234	12

== Finals ==
Home	Score	Away	Match information
Home	Score	Away	Date and time	Venue	Referee	Crowd
Playoff
St. George Dragons	44-16	Eastern Suburbs Roosters	30 August 1983	Sydney Cricket Ground	B. Barnes	17,981
Qualifying Finals
Balmain Tigers	14-17	St. George Dragons	3 September 1983	Sydney Cricket Ground	Kevin Roberts	24,652
Parramatta Eels	30-22	Canterbury Bulldogs	4 September 1983	Sydney Cricket Ground	B. Barnes	22,311
Semi-finals
Canterbury Bulldogs	26-24	St. George Dragons	10 September 1983	Sydney Cricket Ground	John Gocher	27,867
Manly Sea Eagles	19-10	Parramatta Eels	11 September 1983	Sydney Cricket Ground	Kevin Roberts	28,921
Preliminary final
Parramatta Eels	18-4	Canterbury Bulldogs	18 September 1983	Sydney Cricket Ground	Kevin Roberts	27,726
Grand final
Manly Sea Eagles	6-18	Parramatta Eels	25 September 1983	Sydney Cricket Ground	Kevin Roberts	40,285

=== Chart ===
Qualifying final
2	Parramatta	30
3	Canterbury	22
4	Balmain	14
5	St. George	17

Major semi-final
1	Manly	19
Parramatta	10
Minor semi-final
Canterbury	26
St. George	24

Preliminary final
Parramatta	18
Canterbury	4

Grand final
Manly	6
Parramatta	18

=== Grand final ===
Manly Sea Eagles	Position	Parramatta Eels
1. Graham Eadie	FB	1. Paul Taylor
2. John Ribot	WG	2. David Liddiard
3. Chris Close	CE	3. Mick Cronin
4. Phil Sigsworth	CE	4. Steve Ella
5. Kerry Boustead	WG	5. Eric Grothe
6. Alan Thompson (c)	FE	6. Brett Kenny
7. Phil Blake	HB	7. Peter Sterling
8. Ian Schubert	LK	8. Ray Price
9. Noel Cleal	SR	9. Steve Sharp
10. Paul Vautin	SR	10. Peter Wynn
11. Paul McCabe	PR	11. Paul Mares
12. Ray Brown	HK	12. Steve Edge (c)
13. Geoff Gerard	PR	13. Stan Jurd
18. Glenn Ryan	Reserve	16. Chris Phelan
20. Rick Chisolm	Reserve	20. Gary Martine
25. Michael Blake	Reserve	22. Mark Laurie
	Reserve	23. Don Duffy
Bob Fulton	Coach	Jack Gibson

Parramatta powered over Manly for the second year straight to claim their third successive title. The 18–6 win saw Brett Kenny claim a unique achievement in scoring two tries in three successive grand finals. Kenny opened the scoring and the Eels raced to a 10–0 lead after 13 minutes when Eric Grothe steamrolled burly Manly fullback Graham Eadie.

Parramatta 18 (Tries: Brett Kenny 2, Eric Grothe; Goals: Cronin 3)

defeated

Manly-Warringah 6 (Tries: Phil Sigsworth; Goals: Graham Eadie)

== Player statistics ==
The following statistics are as of the conclusion of Round 26:

Top 5 point scorers

Points	Player	Tries	Goals	Field Goals
244	Michael Eden	11	99	2
214	Graham Eadie	7	93	0
202	Mick Cronin	4	93	0
193	Ron Giteau	5	86	1
192	Ross Conlon	7	82	0

Top 5 try scorers

Tries	Player
26	Phil Blake
20	Neil Hunt
19	Chris Anderson
18	Steve Morris
18	Shane McKellar

Top 5 goal scorers

Goals	Player
99	Michael Eden
93	Graham Eadie
93	Mick Cronin
86	Ron Giteau
82	Ross Conlon
