= List of Gold Coast Chargers records =

This is a list of records for the Australian rugby league team that played under the names Gold Coast-Tweed Giants, Gold Coast Seagulls, and finally Gold Coast Chargers. The side competed from 1988 to 1998.

== Club records ==
=== Biggest wins ===
Margin	Score	Opponent	Venue	Date
48	52-4	South Queensland Crushers	Suncorp Stadium	July 21, 1996
26	38-12	South Sydney Rabbitohs	SFS	August 5, 1990
26	32-6	Balmain Tigers	Seagulls Stadium	July 31, 1994
24	28-4	South Sydney Rabbitohs	Carrara Stadium	June 7, 1997
23	29-6	Manly-Warringah Sea Eagles	Seagulls Stadium	July 2, 1989

=== Biggest losses ===
Margin	Score	Opponent	Venue	Date
56	6-62	Melbourne Storm	Olympic Park Stadium	May 31, 1998
46	10-56	Canterbury Bulldogs	Belmore Sports Ground	April 19, 1998
46	0-46	Manly-Warringah Sea Eagles	Brookvale Oval	August 15, 1993
46	0-46	Cronulla Sharks	Caltex Field	June 5, 1994
44	0-44	Canberra Raiders	Seiffert Oval	April 17, 1988
44	4-48	Canberra Raiders	Bruce Stadium	May 22, 1993

=== Longest winning streak ===
- 3 matches, June 7, 1997 - July 5, 1997

=== Longest losing streak ===
- 16 matches, April 25, 1993 - August 28, 1993

== Player records ==
=== Most games ===
Games	Player	Period
86	Jamie Goddard	1992–1998
82	Brett Horsnell	1989–1994
82	Clinton Mohr	1990–1994
77	Wayne Bartrim	1991–1994
74	Brendan Hurst	1994–1997
68	Peter Gill	1992–1995

=== Most career points ===
Points	Player	Tries	Goals	Field goals
285	Brendan Hurst	8	125	3
224	Wayne Bartrim	18	76	0
142	Mike Eden	4	61	4
112	Danny Peacock	28	0	0
104	Peter Benson	8	36	0

=== Most tries in a match ===
Tries	Player	Match details
4	Shane Russell	vs. Western Suburbs Magpies, Campbelltown Sports Ground, Round 1, 1997 (Gold Coast won 24–16)
3	Danny Peacock	vs. Penrith Panthers, Penrith Football Stadium, Round 11, 1995 (Gold Coast lost 24–48)

=== Most goals in a match ===
Goals	Kicker	Match details
8	Brendan Hurst	vs. South Queensland Crushers, Suncorp Stadium, Round 16, 1996 (Gold Coast won 54–4)
6	Michael Eden	vs. Eastern Suburbs Roosters, Round 7, 1989 (Gold Coast won 34–20)
6	Michael Eden	vs. Manly-Warringah Sea Eagles, Round 14, 1989 (Gold Coast won 29 -6)
6	Wayne Bartrim	vs. Balmain Tigers, Seagulls Stadium, Round 18, 1994 (Gold Coast won 32–6)

=== Most points in a match ===
Points	Scorer	Match details
20 (2 tries, 6 goals)	Wayne Bartrim	vs. Balmain Tigers, Seagulls Stadium, Round 18, 1994 (Gold Coast won 32–6)
20 (1 try, 8 goals)	Brendan Hurst	vs. South Queensland Crushers, Suncorp Stadium, Round 16, 1996 (Gold Coast won 54–4)
17 (1 try, 6 goals, 1 field goal)	Michael Eden	vs. Manly-Warringah Sea Eagles, Round 14, 1989 (Gold Coast won 29 -6)
16 (1 try, 6 goals)	Michael Eden	vs. Eastern Suburbs Roosters, Round 7, 1989 (Gold Coast won 34–20)
16 (2 tries, 4 goals)	Craig Weston	vs. South Sydney Rabbitohs, Round 12, 1992 (Gold Coast won 20–6)
16 (2 tries, 4 goals)	Wayne Bartrim	vs. Eastern Suburbs Roosters, Sydney Football Stadium. Round 22, 1994 (Gold Coast lost won 28–30)
16 (4 tries)	Shane Russell	vs. Western Suburbs Magpies, Campbelltown Sports Ground, Round 1, 1997 (Gold Coast won 24–16)

=== Most tries in a season ===
Tries	Scorer	Season details
14	Danny Peacock	21 games, 1995
11	Wes Patten	24 games, 1997
10	Wayne Bartrim	22 games, 1994
8	Scott Mieni	20 games, 1988
8	Lee Oudenryn	18 games, 1996

=== Most points in a season ===
Points	Scorer	Season details
124 (10 tries, 42 goals)	Wayne Bartrim	22 games, 1994
107 (3 tries, 47 goals, 1 field goal)	Brendan Hurst	19 games, 1996
