= Michael Eden =

Australian rugby league footballer ((born 1960)

Mike Eden
Personal information
- Full name: Mike Anthony Eden
- Born: 27 March 1960 (age 66) Sydney, New South Wales, Australia

Playing information
- Height: 178 cm (5 ft 10 in)
- Weight: 75 kg (11 st 11 lb)
- Position: Fullback, Halfback, Five-eighth
Club
Years	Team	Pld	T	G	FG	P
1981–82	Manly Sea Eagles	22	2	72	0	150
1983–84	Eastern Suburbs	36	17	139	2	348
1985–87	Parramatta Eels	26	3	24	1	61
1988–89	Gold Coast	31	4	61	4	142
	Total	115	26	296	7	701
- Relatives: Harry Eden (uncle)

Mike Anthony Eden (born 27 March 1960) is an Australian former professional rugby league footballer who played in the 1980s. The slightly built Eden played for Manly-Warringah, Eastern Suburbs, Parramatta and the Gold Coast in the NSWRL premiership. Originally appearing in the halves, he later played at fullback.

== Playing career ==
A Manly junior who made his first grade debut for the Sea Eagles from the bench in Manly's 28–10 loss to Penrith at Penrith Park on 18 April 1981. Eden only played two first grade games for Manly in the 1981 season, the other (also from the bench) saw the Sea Eagles come away with a 22–15 win over defending premiers Canterbury-Bankstown Bulldogs at Manly's Brookvale Oval.

The 1982 season saw Eden play 19 games for the Sea Eagles playing mostly at fullback due to the emergence of teenage halfback Phil Blake and injury to champion Manly fullback Graham Eadie. Eden would be the Sea Eagles top point scorer for the year (the first time since 1972 that honour would go to a player other than Eadie), scoring 2 tries and 71 goals for 148 points. Eadie returned late in the season and resumed the fullback role with Eden missing the Sea Eagles run to the Grand Final where they ultimately lost 21–8 to Parramatta. During the season, Eden was named the player of the series in the 1982 KB Cup won by Manly for the first time. Eden's form in 1982, plus his goal kicking and utility value saw his name touted as a possible selection for the 1982 Kangaroo Tour of Great Britain and France. However, missing Manly's late season games and finals campaign would prove costly and he ultimately missed out on a place in the Australian squad for the Kangaroo Tour.

With Eadie back for the 1983 NSWRFL season, Eden signed to play for Eastern Suburbs and would become the season's leading point scorer, scoring 256 points (12 tries, 103 goals, and 2 field goals). He also won the competition's Best and Fairest award, the Rothmans Medal, in 1983. Eden later said, "Manly eventually told me they weren't going to be able to go anywhere near what they were offering over at the Roosters, but that they’d still love me to stay. I just said, 'Look, you've offered me three grand, the Roosters have offered me 25 ... I'm newly married and got a kid on the way ... a university wage, help me out here.' So I signed with the Roosters.'

After an injury interrupted 1984 season where he scored 96 points (5 tries, 36 goals) playing only 13 games mostly at fullback or Five-eighth, he signed with Parramatta for the 1985 season. He would spend 3 injuries interrupted seasons with the Eels, playing only 27 games for the club and like he had done in 1982 with Manly, he missed the Eels charge to the premiership in 1986.

Eden signed for new club the Gold Coast Giants in 1988. That season saw him play 19 games for the club where he would be the team's leading point scorer with 79 points (1 try, 36 goals, 3 field goals) and had the honour of scoring the club's first ever try in their opening game of the season against Canterbury-Bankstown. He played a further 12 games in 1989 for the poorly performed Giants and was again their leading point scorer with 63 points (3 tries, 25 goals and 1 field goal) before announcing his retirement at the end of the season.

Mike Eden played 112 first grade games in his career. A player of rare ability who could kick both in general play and for goal with either feet with equal effectiveness, he scored a total of 701 points from 26 tries, 296 goals, and 7 field goals.

== Family ==
Eden's uncle, Harry Eden, was also a rugby league footballer, playing for St George, Eastern Suburbs, and South Sydney clubs.

== Current ==
Eden currently works as a solicitor in Albury NSW and is also on the committee for the Albury Thunder Rugby League Club in Group 9 Rugby League.

== Sources ==
- Whiticker, Alan; Hudson, Glen (2007). The Encyclopedia of Rugby League Players. Wetherill Park, New South Wales: Gary Allen Pty Ltd. p. 609. ISBN 978-1-877082-93-1.
