= Harry Eden (rugby league) =

Australian rugby league footballer (1943–2006)

Personal information
- Full name: Harry Lindsay Eden
- Born: 23 May 1943 Kogarah, New South Wales, Australia
- Died: 14 December 2006 (aged 63) Kogarah, New South Wales, Australia

Playing information
- Position: Prop
Club
Years	Team	Pld	T	G	FG	P
1969	Eastern Suburbs	9	3	0	0	9
1971–73	St George Dragons	26	7	0	0	21
1974–75	South Sydney	38	17	0	0	51
	Total	73	27	0	0	81
- Relatives: Michael Eden (nephew)

Harry Lindsay Eden (23 May 1943 – 14 December 2006) was a rugby league footballer who played with three Sydney clubs during his career – Eastern Suburbs, St George and South Sydney Rabbitohs. He was born in Sydney and played junior rugby league for Ramsgate United in the St George Junior league.

== Career ==
Eden began his career with the Eastern Suburbs club as a centre in 1969 before moving to the St. George Dragons where he played in the front row.

He played three seasons with the Dragons between 1971–1973 and was a member of St George first grade team that was defeated by South Sydney in the 1971 Grand Final.

He was a member of the St. George Third Grade side that won the premiership in 1972. Harry Eden played his last two seasons with South Sydney Rabbitohs in 1974 and 1975. He was the uncle of Rothmans Medal winner Michael Eden.

In the 1975 season, while playing South Sydney, Eden tied the record for the most tries in a season (11) by a prop forward. (Note: Jack Holland (St George) was the first to achieve the feat in 1950. Ryan James broke it with 12 tries in 2016.)

== Death ==
Harry Eden died of cancer in 2006 aged 63.

== Sources ==
- The Encyclopedia of Rugby League Players; Alan Whiticker & Glen Hudson
