= Michael Blake (rugby league) =

English rugby league footballer

Personal information
- Full name: Michael Blake
- Born: 20 April 1961 (age 65) London, England, United Kingdom

Playing information
- Position: Centre
Club
| Years | Team | Pld | T | G | FG | P |
|---|---|---|---|---|---|---|
| 1979–84 | Manly Sea Eagles | 66 | 24 | 0 | 0 | 80 |
| 1985–86 | Canberra Raiders | 7 | 2 | 0 | 0 | 8 |
| 1987–88 | South Sydney | 36 | 2 | 0 | 0 | 8 |
| | Total | 109 | 28 | 0 | 0 | 96 |
- Source: As of 11 April 2019
- Relatives: Phil Blake (brother)

Michael Blake is a former professional rugby league footballer who played in the 1970s and 1980s. He played for Manly-Warringah, Canberra Raiders and South Sydney in the New South Wales Rugby League (NSWRL) competition.

== Background ==
Blake was born in London, England to British parents, but moved to Sydney with his family at an early age. He is the older brother of former professional rugby league footballer, Phil Blake.

He played his junior rugby league for Forestville and St. Augustines.

== Playing career ==
Blake made his first grade debut for Manly against the Balmain in Round 18 1979 at the Brookvale Oval. It wasn't until the 1982 season that Blake began to establish himself in the starting side. Blake scored 11 tries in 25 games for Manly as they reached the 1982 NSWRL grand final against the Parramatta Eels. Blake played at centre in the match as Manly were beaten 21-8 after trailing 16–3 at halftime.

In 1983, Blake made 17 appearances as Manly reached the 1983 NSWRL grand final in a rematch against Parramatta. Blake played from the bench as Manly were defeated for a second time in the decider 18–6. At the end of 1984, Blake was released by Manly and he joined the Canberra Raiders. Blake only managed 7 appearances over 2 seasons at Canberra before he was released. Blake then went on to join South Sydney where his brother Phil was playing.

Blake became a regular starter for Souths as the club finished 5th in 1987 before suffering an embarrassing 46–12 loss against his former club Canberra in the finals series. The match is remembered for the poor performance of Steve Mavin who made a number of errors and was taken off at half time. Mavin later claimed that he left the ground after being substituted and watched the second half from the Cauliflower Hotel in Waterloo.

Blake played one final season in 1988 before retiring. The following year, Souths would go on to win the minor premiership in 1989.
