= FootyTAB =

Australian betting agency

FootyTAB is the name of a number of pool-based sports betting options in Australia, most commonly associated with Australian rugby league, previously operated separately by the New South Wales and Queensland totalisator agency boards, or TABs, with the New South Wales version currently operated by successor company Tabcorp. FootyTAB was offered on Brisbane Rugby League and New South Wales Rugby League games (and successors to the latter including the current National Rugby League) in an era where fixed-odds sports betting was not prevalent in Australia, and continues to be offered on NRL games.

FootyTAB is also used as the name of the similar Australian rules football pool betting also operated by Tabcorp on AFL games, while similar pool betting under different names is operated by the Western Australia TAB on AFL and also WAFL matches.

== Betting options ==
In rugby league, three options existed in both states, and continues to be offered in the modern rugby league version of FootyTAB:

- Pick the Winners, which requires a wagerer to pick the winners of all matches in a round, with less favoured teams given a points start,
- Pick the Margins, which requires not only the selection of a winner but also one of two margins (based on actual scores),
- Pick the Score, which requires selection of the exact score of a single game (also based on actual scores).

While these remain colloquial names for the bet types, the modern bet type name is generally shortened (eg. "NRL Winners".)

At the time of its demise in the 2010s, the Queensland version (which also covered NRL games, then offered by former operator UBET) also offered Pick the Result, which required selection of a single game's winner and exact margin (eg. "Broncos by 14 points").

In the Australian rules version, instead of Pick the Score, single game, doubles and four-selection "quads" are offered; in some cases these are half time/full time doubles and "quarter quads" (ie. scores at the end of each half or quarter). Winning selections generally involve selection of a winner (or leader) and a margin bracket of two or three goals (12 or 18 points).

== Pick The Winners ==
In Pick The Winners, punters are required to select all the winning teams in a round. In order to make selection more difficult, points start are given by a panel appointed by the TAB to the team considered less likely to win. So that the scores could never possibly be exactly equal after the start is added, points start are always given as half points. This points start is summed to the actual score for the match to create a total score and the team with the greater total score is declared the winner. For example, in the first round of the 1993 season, the results and total score were as follows:

Home team	Points start	Away team	Points start	Match score	"Pick The Winners" score	FootyTAB winner
Canberra		St. George	7.5	Canberra 8 St. George 22	Canberra 8 St. George 29.5	St. George
Balmain	6.5	Canterbury		Balmain 14; Canterbury 19	Balmain 20.5; Canterbury 19	Balmain
Newcastle		Easts	5.5	Newcastle 10; Easts 20	Newcastle 10; Easts 25.5	Easts
Norths	1.5	Manly		Norths 19; Manly 4	Norths 20.5; Manly 4	Norths
Penrith		Parramatta	8.5	Penrith 10; Parramatta 11	Penrith 10; Parramatta 18.5	Parramatta
Cronulla	9.5	Brisbane		Cronulla 10; Brisbane 19	Cronulla 19.5; Brisbane 19	Cronulla
Wests		Gold Coast	9.5	Wests 14; Gold Coast 10	Wests 14; Gold Coast 19.5	Gold Coast
Illawarra		Souths	5.5	Illawarra 19; Souths 0	Illawarra 19; Souths 5.5	Illawarra

For split rounds coinciding with State of Origin matches, "Pick The Winners" and "Pick The Margins" are conducted separately for each week of the split round. However, punters betting on the first week of a split round were also required to bet on the State of Origin match in the appropriate format.

Rugby league introduced overtime (in the form of golden point) to potentially resolve draws in 2003. Originally these points were been taken into account in all forms of FootyTAB betting, however currently (as of 2026) these are excluded and all results are taken at the end of normal time.

== Pick The Margins ==
In "Pick The Margins", punters are required to select the results of every game played during a round. This involved determining who will win and by what margin they will win. For "Pick The Margins", points start given by FootyTAB are not considered. Thus, using the points spreads then current, the correct results for the opening round of 1993 would have been:

Home team	Score	Away team	Score	FootyTAB margin
Canberra	8	St. George	22	St. George 13+
Balmain	14	Canterbury	19	Canterbury 1–12
Newcastle	10	Easts	20	Easts 1–12
Norths	19	Manly	4	Norths 13+
Penrith	10	Parramatta	11	Parramatta 1–12
Cronulla	10	Brisbane	19	Brisbane 1–12
Wests	14	Gold Coast	10	Wests 1–12
Illawarra	19	Souths	0	Illawarra 13+

Originally "Pick The Margins" had two-point spreads, 1-12 and 13+. However, with the increase of scoring due to the 10-metre rule introduced during 1993 and the popular desire for larger dividends, FootyTAB increased the number of point spreads to three (1-10, 11-20 and 21+) for the 2001 season. Before draws were largely eliminated by extra time in 2003, it was possible also to bet on a match being drawn as a fifth selection. Currently (as of 2026), Pick the Margins has since returned to the original two point spreads plus draw option.

In the Australian rules football version, the point spreads used are 1-39 and 40+, with the very unlikely event of a draw still available.

The larger number of possible selections in "Pick The Margins" has meant that dividends have always been much larger than the modest "Pick The Winners" prizes. It has always been common for no punter to successfully pick every correct margin in a round. Up until the end of 1993, prizes were paid when this occurred to punters with one or even two incorrect selections. However, on 7 March 1994, FootyTAB announced Pick The Margins prize money would jackpot unless some punter selected every correct margin in a round. However, if no one selected all correct margins in the last week of "Pick The Margins" betting for a season, then prizes would be (and are still) paid out to the punter with the most correct margins since the jackpot began.

Jackpots brought about a major increase in the popularity of "Pick The Margins" betting so that it became the most popular type of bet on rugby league in Australia. Today, "Pick The Margins" prizes are usually greater than the largest available from betting on horse racing, with the record being $2,006,217 awarded to one punter after three successive jackpots on 8 July 1996. (it is noteworthy that this punter only won as a result of a last minute Sydney City penalty goal).

== Pick The Score ==
In "Pick The Score", punters are required to predict the exact number of points a team will score in a match. "Pick The Score" has typically been available on matches televised on Channel 9 and previously the ABC only. As rounds became spread over a greater number of days, the number of games on which "Pick The Score" was available increased.

All individual scores from 2 points to 48 are available, along with a "0 or 1" point option as well as "49+".

Dividends in "Pick The Score", though higher than for "Pick The Winners", are not usually as high as "Pick The Margins" because each game is a separate prize. Although there have been some cases where no correct entry has been drawn - usually occurring where a losing team scored an odd number of points through kicking a field goal before the opposition scored several tries, there have never been jackpots on "Pick The Score", because S18.3.21 of The Totalizator Rules specifies countback procedures that enable a dividend to be declared. In cases where nobody selected a game's full-time score, prizes are paid out to those punters who were closest, as in the following examples:

Date of match	Home team	Away team	Match score	Scores to which "Pick The Score" prize paid out
19 June 1988	Balmain	Canberra	Balmain 15, Canberra 39	Balmain 14, Canberra 39; Balmain 16, Canberra 39
8 May 1994	Manly	Brisbane	Manly 21, Brisbane 11	Manly 21, Brisbane 10; Manly 21, Brisbane 12

In recent years as "Pick The Margins" has become more popular, "Pick The Score" has declined considerably.

== History ==
Although there is a lot of evidence that betting on rugby league in Australia has been common ever since the game began in 1908, governments of the period were strongly dedicated to outlawing sports betting and betting on league was thus illegal until the Wran Government legalised it for the 1983 season, in response to the lucrative illegal betting market since race meetings were banned for one week a month during World War II. Betting in the period between the war had always been based on selecting the winners after points start were added, and a report commissioned by the State Government in late 1981 showed that illegal bookmakers were offering set odds for picking the winners of each round and that this allowed these bookmakers to make large profits. Thus it was recommended that a system of legal betting in which dividends offered depended upon the proportion of punters predicting the correct winners was to be preferred. This system was instigated for the 1983 season.

Initially only "Pick The Winners" was offered, but FootyTAB was such a success that it garnered news space in the Sydney Morning Herald rarely allocated to betting on horse or dog racing. Almost eight million dollars was bet on FootyTAB in its first year, and expansion with "Pick The Margins" and "Pick The Score" followed in 1984. The growth of legal betting on league was slow but steady until 1993, but "Pick The Margins" became the chief focus when jackpots were introduced in 1994 and produced much larger prize pools: as a result of two weeks of jackpots, a pool of $1,618,401 was available for the third premiership round that season. With the 20-team competition of 1995 and 1996, "Pick The Margins" prizes reach record levels, in one case exceeding two million dollars after successive jackpots. "Pick The Score", which declined in popularity during this period, was also modified to accommodate higher scores from the 10-metre rule by allowing a 49+ score - which occurred only eleven times between 1984 and 1992.

After the game's rationalisation following the Super League war, "Pick The Margins" dividends declined, and FootyTAB consequently added more points spread, with considerable success as shown by a 1.35 million dollar dividend in 2004.

Other developments of FootyTAB since the reunification of rugby league have been multiple bets, in which a punter can select more than one margin or score for a game with bets of more than one dollar.
