= Paul Mares (rugby league) =

Australian rugby league footballer

Personal information
- Full name: Paul Mares
- Born: 20 September 1963 (age 61); Sydney, New South Wales, Australia

Playing information
- Position: Second-row, Prop
Club
Years	Team	Pld	T	G	FG	P
1982–87	Parramatta Eels	73	3	0	0	12
1989	Eastern Suburbs	6	0	0	0	0
	Total	79	3	0	0	12

Paul Mares (born 20 September 1963) is an Australian former professional rugby league footballer who played in the 1980s.

== Playing career ==
Mares made his first grade debut for Parramatta in 1982 but only featured in three matches that season and was not a member of the 1982 premiership winning side.

In 1983, Mares was part of the Parramatta side which won its third consecutive premiership defeating Manly-Warringah in the grand final.

Mares then played in the 1984 grand final loss to Canterbury which was Parramatta's fourth consecutive grand final appearance.

Over the next couple of seasons, Mares struggled with injuries and missed out on being selected in Parramatta's 1986 premiership winning team.

In 1989, Mares moved to Eastern Suburbs but only managed to make six appearances before a recurring knee injury forced him into retirement.

In 2021, Mares pled guilty in Cooma local Court to not providing a sample to an oral test for drugs, driving a vehicle with menace, not obeying a police direction and not keeping to the left of a road.
