= Ern Cannon =

Australian rugby league footballer

Personal information
- Full name: Ernie Cannon
- Born: 27 August 1921 Sydney, New South Wales, Australia
- Died: 7 December 2015 (aged 94) Sydney, New South Wales, Australia

Playing information
- Position: Hooker
Club
Years	Team	Pld	T	G	FG	P
1947	Manly-Warringah	1	0	0	0	0
- Source: As of 27 March 2019

Ern Cannon (27 August 1921 – 7 December 2015) was an Australian professional rugby league footballer who played in the 1940s. He played for Manly-Warringah in the NSWRL competition. Cannon was a foundation player for Manly-Warringah featuring in the club's first ever game.

== Background ==
Cannon was born in Pyrmont, a suburb of Sydney, in August 2921. He served as a navigator during World War II. At the end of the war, he spent several months flying Australian prisoners of war back home. Cannon played in the local Manly competition before being selected to play for Manly-Warringah in 1947 as the club had been admitted into the NSWRL competition along with Parramatta.

== Playing career ==
Cannon played in Manly's first ever game on 12 April 1947 against Western Suburbs at Brookvale Oval. Manly lost the game 15-13 even though Manly had scored more tries than Wests.

Manly would go on to finish second last on the table above Parramatta during their inaugural year avoiding the wooden spoon by 2 competition points. Cannon retired as a rugby league player following the conclusion of the 1947 season.

== Post playing ==
After retiring as a player, Cannon took up tennis and owned several tennis courts in the Manly region. He died on 7 December 2015.
