= James Hall (rugby league) =

Australian rugby league footballer

Personal information
- Full name: James Hall
- Born: 1922; Sydney, New South Wales, Australia
- Died: 2011; Sydney, New South Wales, Australia

Playing information
- Position: Centre
Club
Years	Team	Pld	T	G	FG	P
1942–45	North Sydney	27	6	0	0	18
1947	Manly-Warringah	3	0	0	0	0
	Total	30	6	0	0	18
- Source: As of 26 March 2019

James Hall (1922–2011), also known as Jim Hall, was an Australian rugby league footballer who played in the 1940s. He played for North Sydney and Manly-Warringah in the NSWRL competition. Hall was a foundation player for Manly-Warringah, featuring in the club's first season and first game.

== Playing career ==
Hall began his first grade career with North Sydney in 1942. He played with Norths up until the end of 1945 but he did not play in the club's 1943 grand final defeat against Newtown.

In 1946, it was announced that two new clubs were to be admitted into the NSWRL competition for the 1947 season which were Parramatta and Manly-Warringah. Due to the residency rules at the time, Hall fell under the Manly district zone and was required to play for them.

Hall played in Manly's first ever game on April 12, 1947, against Western Suburbs at Brookvale Oval. Manly lost the game 15–13 even though Manly scored more tries than Wests. Hall managed to make only two further appearances for Manly before retiring at the end of the season.
