= Phil Blake =

English rugby league footballer (born 1963)

Personal information
- Born: 24 November 1963 (age 62) London, England, United Kingdom

Playing information
- Height: 175 cm (5 ft 9 in)
- Weight: 83 kg (13 st 1 lb)
- Position: Halfback, Five-eighth, Fullback, Centre
Club
Years	Team	Pld	T	G	FG	P
1982–86	Manly Sea Eagles	93	63	0	7	250
1985–89	Warrington	44	41	0	4	168
1987–90	South Sydney	75	37	8	6	170
1989	Wigan	11	7	17	0	62
1991	North Sydney	11	1	0	1	5
1992	Canberra Raiders	16	5	0	1	21
1993–94	St. George Dragons	29	15	0	0	60
1995–97	Auckland Warriors	37	17	0	0	68
	Total	316	186	25	19	804
Representative
Years	Team	Pld	T	G	FG	P
1988	NSW City	1	0	0	0	0
1988	President's XIII	1	0	0	0	0
1989	New South Wales	1	0	0	0	0

Coaching information
Club
Years	Team	Gms	W	D	L	W%
2012	Western Force	8	1	0	7	13
- Relatives: Michael Blake (brother)

Phil Blake (born 24 November 1963) is a British-born Australian former rugby league footballer and a professional rugby union coach.

Originally a halfback, Blake developed into a utility player and played first grade matches in all the backline positions, as well as at hooker and lock. He represented New South Wales on one occasion.

Blake has held coaching positions with the Wallabies, Western Force, Manly RUFC and Leicester Tigers.

== Early life ==
Blake was born in London, England, but moved to Sydney with his family at an early age. While attending Christian Brothers College in Manly, Blake played for the Australian Schoolboys team in 1981. Phil Blake is the younger brother of former Manly, Canberra and South Sydney player Michael Blake.

== Playing career ==
=== Manly ===
Blake made his début for the Manly-Warringah Sea Eagles in Round 12 of the 1982 season, coming off the bench for the Sea Eagles in their 20–19 win over Eastern Suburbs at Brookvale Oval. Blake played 14 games in his rookie year, playing five-eighth, centre and halfback. He scored 9 tries in 1982, and was a try scorer for Manly in their 21–8 loss to defending premiers Parramatta in the 1982 Grand Final. Blake won the Dally M Rookie of the Year award.

Blake's good form continued in 1983, cementing his position as the club's first choice halfback. He broke the Sea Eagles club record for the most tries scored in a season with 27 the top try scorer in the league. Blake's 27 tries were scored from just 23 games played and was only surpassed in 2021 as the Manly club record for most tries in a premiership season. Manly won through to the 1983 Grand Final, again against Parramatta, and for the second time in two seasons.

After playing 21 of his 23 games at halfback in 1983, he played there only 10 times in 1984, spending most of his time at centre as coach Fulton tried to cover his defensive lapses. This also allowed Fulton to play others (such as halfback Des Hasler who had joined the club from Penrith) in their preferred positions. After scoring 27 tries in 23 games in 1983, Blake scored only 11 tries from 23 games in 1984.

Blake broke his arm during the opening round of the 1985 season against Penrith. He returned to the field in Round 9 against Canberra, but was again used in various backline positions and only scored 3 tries in 11 games.

During the 1985/86 off-season Phil Blake traveled to England and played for Warrington, he played at centre (replaced by substitute Mark Forster) in Warrington's 8–34 defeat by Wigan in the 1985 Lancashire Cup Final during the 1985–86 season at Knowsley Road, St. Helens, on Sunday 13 October 1985,

In the 1986 NSWRL season, Blake was again the league's top try scorer with 13, sharing the mark with Balmain's Great Britain international import Garry Schofield and despite having that statistic, for the second time in a Kangaroo Tour year, he was overlooked for selection on the 1986 Kangaroo tour. However, after four seasons under Fulton, he was unwanted by Manly and following the season signed to play for the South Sydney Rabbitohs from 1987.

=== Souths ===
In 1987, Blake joined Rabbitohs and went on to play four seasons for the club. Returning to his schoolboy position of five-eighth, Blake was instrumental in Souths winning the minor premiership in 1989. He played 75 games for Souths.

He returned to England to play for Wigan for the 1988/89 season. After returning from England, Blake, and Souths went from being minor premiers in 1989 to finishing with the wooden spoon in 1990, the biggest slide from grace in the competition's history.

=== Nomad ===
After three seasons at Souths, Blake joined the North Sydney Bears for 1991, however despite the Bears reaching the finals for the first time since 1982, he only played eleven games for the club and moved again at the end of the year, joining the Canberra Raiders.

Blake moved again at the end of the 1992 season, joining the St. George Dragons. He came off the reserves bench for the Dragons in the 1993 Grand Final who lost their second Grand Final in two seasons to the Brisbane Broncos. It was Blake's 3rd Grand Final loss in his 3rd attempt after having lost the 1982 and 1983 Grand Finals with Manly.

In 1995, he joined the new Auckland Warriors franchise, and was in their inaugural run-on side. He played three seasons for the club, his longest spell at one club since the Rabbitohs. Phil Blake, who played fullback in the Warrior's first game against the Broncos at Auckland's Mount Smart Stadium before 29,220 fans, scored the new club's first ever try in the game's 21st minute after a dash down the left wing by Whetu Taewa. Blake, as always there in support, had an easy 10m run to the line. Despite this the Warriors went down narrowly to the two time premiership winners 25–22.

=== Representative career ===
Despite narrowly missing out on a Kangaroos jersey in 1982 and again in 1986, Blake never established himself at representative level. In 1988, he played for City, and in 1989 he came off the bench in a State of Origin match for New South Wales, but that was the extent of his representative career. Along with Ian Roberts and James McManus, he is to date one of three British-born players to play State of Origin.

In 1988, Blake was selected at fullback for an Australian select side called the President's XIII to play the touring Great Britain Lions. On a wet and muddy day at the Seiffert Oval in Canberra, the President's XIII defeated the Lions 24–18.

=== Retirement ===
Blake trained with the Manly team at the start of the 1998 season before announcing his retirement. He finished his career having played 261 games, scoring 138 tries as well as kicking eight goals and fifteen field goals.

=== Matches played ===
Team	Matches	Tries	Goals	Field goals	Years
Manly-Warringah Sea Eagles	93	63	–	7	1982–1986
NSW City Seconds	2	3	–	–	1983, 1987
Warrington	43	40	–	4	1985, 1988
South Sydney Rabbitohs	75	37	8	6	1987–1990
NSW City Origin	1	–	–	–	1988
Australian Presidents XIII	1	–	–	–	1988
NSW City Firsts	1	–	–	–	1989
New South Wales	1	–	–	–	1989
Wigan	10	7	13	–	1989
North Sydney Bears	11	1	–	1	1991
Canberra Raiders	16	5	–	1	1992
St George Dragons	29	15	–	–	1993–1994
Auckland Warriors	37	17	–	–	1995–1997
TOTAL	320	188	21	19	1982–1997

== Coaching career ==
=== Rugby league ===
Blake was appointed the sprint coach at the South Sydney Rabbitohs for their return season in 2002. When Craig Coleman was fired as head coach at the beginning of the 2003 season, Blake was appointed the temporary head coach until he was replaced by Paul Langmack.

=== Rugby union ===
In 2006, Blake began his rugby union coaching career as assistant coach of the Southern Districts first grade side. He joined Manly as head coach a year later. Blake suffered from a series of potentially life-threatening blood clots in 2008 and spent some time in hospital. In 2010, he underwent triple heart bypass surgery.

After taking Manly into the semi-finals in 2010, Blake was appointed as defence and skills coach to the Wallabies under head coach Robbie Deans. He joined the Western Force as defence and skills coach for the 2011 season. When Richard Graham was stood down as head coach of the Force during the 2012 season, Blake became the interim head coach before Michael Foley was appointed for the 2013 season.

Blake returned to Manly as head coach in 2013. In 2014, he was appointed as head coach of the North Harbour Rays for the inaugural National Rugby Championship season. However, on 2 June 2014 it was announced that he had been appointed as defence coach for Leicester Tigers in the English Premiership. Blake incurred a six-month ban from rugby for breaching RFU betting rules after placing eight separate bets on two Tigers games while he was the defence coach at the club.
