= 2012 Manly Warringah Sea Eagles season =

Team information
- CEO: (Australia) David Perry
- Coach: (Australia) Geoff Toovey
- Captain: (Australia) Jamie Lyon and Jason King
- Stadium: Brookvale Oval
| ← 2011 | 2013 → |

The 2012 Manly Warringah Sea Eagles season was the 63rd in the club's history. Coached by Geoff Toovey and co-captained by Jamie Lyon and Jason King, they competed in the National Rugby League's 2012 Telstra Premiership, finishing the regular season 4th (out of 16). Having made their eighth consecutive finals series, the Sea Eagles then came to within one match of the 2012 NRL Grand Final but lost to eventual premiers the Melbourne Storm.

Shortly after their 2011 NRL Grand Final victory, the Manly Warringah Sea Eagles' head coach, Des Hasler left for cross-town rivals the Canterbury-Bankstown Bulldogs, leaving his assistant Geoff Toovey to take up the head coach role. The Sea Eagles started their season, and Toovey his coaching career, by travelling to England for the 2012 World Club Challenge.

Awards:

- NRL Roy Bull Best & Fairest: Matt Ballin
- NRL Rookie of the Year: Jorge Taufua
- NRL Doug Daley Clubman of the Year: Joe Galuvao
- NRL Players' Player: Jamie Lyon
- NRL Leading Try Scorer: Brett Stewart (14)
- NRL Leading Points Scorer: Jamie Lyon (190)
- Steve Menzies Medallion: Sam Rahme
- Gordon Willoughby Medal: Jamie Lyon
- Member of the Year: Margaret Anthony
- NSW Cup Players' Player: Tim Robinson
- NSW Cup Best and Fairest: Liam Higgins
- Toyota Cup Players' Player: Nathan Cooper
- Toyota Cup Russ Bull Best and Fairest: Josh Drinkwater
