= 2014 Manly Warringah Sea Eagles season =

65th Manly Warringah Sea Eagles season

- NRL rank: 2nd
- Points scored: For: 502; against: 399

Team information
- CEO: (Australia) David Perry
- Coach: (Australia) Geoff Toovey
- Captain: (Australia) Jamie Lyon and Jason King
- Stadium: Brookvale Oval

Top scorers
- Goals: Jamie Lyon (65 Goals)
← 2013	2015 →

The 2014 Manly Warringah Sea Eagles season was the 65th in the club's history. Coached by Geoff Toovey and co-captained by Jamie Lyon and Jason King, they competed in the National Rugby League's 2014 Telstra Premiership, finishing the regular season 2nd (out of 16). Having made their 10th consecutive finals series, the Sea Eagles were knocked in the second week of play-offs by eventual grand finalists, the Canterbury-Bankstown Bulldogs. Manly were leading the NRL Table for the greater part of the season, only to place 2nd after losing to the Cowboys.

== Pre-season ==
The Sea Eagles competed in the 2014 NRL Auckland Nines tournament during the pre-season, the first time the 9-a-side knockout competition was held. Manly won 1 of 3 games.

== Departures ==
Manly suffered the loss of Glenn Stewart after salary cap problems. Stewart, went to South Sydney Rabbitohs and will play there on a 2-year contract.
