= List of Dally M Awards winners =

The Dally M Medal is awarded annually to the player voted for as the 'best and fairest' over the entire National Rugby League (NRL) regular season. The award has existed since 1979, but has only been adopted as the official award for the Player of the Year in the NRL since 1998. As well as honouring the player of the year, who received the Dally M Medal, awards are also given to the premier player in each position, the best coach, the best captain, representative player of the year and the most outstanding rookie of the season. The awards are named in honour of Australian former rugby league great Herbert Henry "Dally" Messenger.

Contents
| 1979 | 1980 | 1981 | 1982 |
|---|---|---|---|
| 1983 | 1984 | 1985 | 1986 |
| 1987 | 1988 | 1989 | 1990 |
| 1991 | 1992 | 1993 | 1994 |
| 1995 | 1996 | 1997 | 1998 |
| 1999 | 2000 | 2001 | 2002 |
| 2003 | 2004 | 2005 | 2006 |
| 2007 | 2008 | 2009 | 2010 |
| 2011 | 2012 | 2013 | 2014 |
| 2015 | 2016 | 2017 | 2018 |
| 2019 | 2020 | 2021 | 2022 |
| 2023 | 2024 | 2025 | 2026 |

== 1979 ==
- Player of the Year: Steve Morris (St George Dragons)

== 1980 ==
- Player of the Year: Robert Laurie (South Sydney)
- Fullback: Brian Johnson (St George)
- Winger: John Ribot (Western Suburbs)
- Centre: Michael Cronin (Parramatta)
- Five-eighth: Robert Laurie (South Sydney)
- Halfback: Kevin Hastings (Eastern Suburbs)
- Lock: Jim Leis (Western Suburbs)
- Second row: Nathan Gibbs (South Sydney)
- Prop: Craig Young (St George)
- Hooker: John Lang (Eastern Suburbs)
- Coach: Roy Masters (Western Suburbs)
- Top pointscorer: Steve Gearin (Canterbury)

== 1981 ==
- Player of the Year: Steve Rogers (Cronulla)
- Fullback: Greg Brentnall (Canterbury)
- Winger: Terry Fahey (Eastern Suburbs)
- Centre: Michael Cronin (Parramatta)
- Five-eighth: Mick Pattison (South Sydney)
- Halfback: Kevin Hastings (Eastern Suburbs)
- Lock: Steve Rogers (Cronulla)
- Second row: Mark Graham (North Sydney)
- Prop: Dane Sorensen (Cronulla)
- Hooker: Jeff Masterman (Eastern Suburbs)
- Coach: Bob Fulton (Eastern Suburbs)
- Rookie: Jeff Masterman (Eastern Suburbs)

== 1982 ==
- Player of the Year: Ray Price (Parramatta)
- Fullback: Greg Brentnall (Canterbury)
- Winger: John Ribot (Manly-Warringah)
- Centre: Michael Cronin (Parramatta)
- Five-eighth: Mitchell Cox (North Sydney)
- Halfback: Kevin Hastings (Eastern Suburbs)
- Lock: Ray Price (Parramatta)
- Second row: Mark Graham (North Sydney)
- Prop: Don McKinnon (North Sydney)
- Hooker: John Gray (North Sydney)
- Coach: Jack Gibson (Parramatta)
- Top pointscorer: Michael Cronin (Parramatta)

== 1983 ==
- Player of the Year: Terry Lamb (Western Suburbs)
- Fullback: Graham Eadie (Manly-Warringah)
- Winger: Kerry Boustead (Manly-Warringah)
- Centre: Michael Cronin (Parramatta)
- Five-eighth: Terry Lamb (Western Suburbs)
- Halfback: Peter Sterling (Parramatta)
- Lock: Ray Price (Parramatta)
- Second row: Paul Vautin (Manly-Warringah)
- Prop: Dave Brown (Manly-Warringah)
- Hooker: Billy Johnstone (Canterbury)
- Coach: Bob Fulton (Manly-Warringah)
- Top tryscorer: Phil Blake (Manly-Warringah)
- Top pointscorer: Mike Eden (Eastern Suburbs)

== 1984 ==
- Player of the Year: Michael Potter (Canterbury)
- Fullback: Michael Potter (Canterbury)
- Winger: Steve Morris (St George)
- Centre: Steve Ella (Parramatta)
- Five-eighth: Terry Lamb (Canterbury)
- Halfback: Peter Sterling (Parramatta)
- Lock: Ray Price (Parramatta)
- Second row: Noel Cleal (Manly-Warringah)
- Prop: Steve Roach (Balmain)
- Hooker: Royce Simmons (Penrith)
- Coach: Tim Sheens (Penrith)

== 1985 ==
- Player of the Year: Greg Alexander (Penrith)
- Fullback: Garry Jack (Balmain)
- Winger: John Ferguson (Eastern Suburbs)
- Centre: Steve Ella (Parramatta)
- Five-eighth: Neil Baker (Souths)
- Halfback: Greg Alexander (Penrith)
- Lock: Ray Price (Parramatta)
- Second row: Peter Wynn (Parramatta)
- Prop: Craig Young (St George)
- Hooker: Ben Elias (Balmain)
- Coach: Roy Masters (St George)
- Rookie: Steve Linnane (St George)

== 1986 ==
- Player of the Year: Peter Sterling (Parramatta)
- Fullback: Garry Jack (Balmain)
- Winger: Les Kiss (North Sydney)
- Centre: Michael O'Connor (St George)
- Five-eighth: Terry Lamb (Canterbury)
- Halfback: Peter Sterling (Parramatta)
- Lock: Ray Price (Parramatta)
- Second row: Noel Cleal (Manly-Warringah)
- Prop: Steve Roach (Balmain)
- Hooker: Mal Cochrane (Manly-Warringah)
- Coach: George Piggins (South Sydney)
- Rookie: Paul Sironen (Balmain Tigers)

== 1987 ==
- Player of the Year: Peter Sterling (Parramatta)
- Fullback: Gary Belcher (Canberra)
- Winger: Steve Morris (Eastern Suburbs)
- Centre: Michael O'Connor (Manly-Warringah)
- Five-eighth: Terry Lamb (Canterbury)
- Halfback: Peter Sterling (Parramatta)
- Lock: Wayne Pearce (Balmain)
- Second row: Hugh McGahan (Eastern Suburbs)
- Prop: Ian Roberts (South Sydney)
- Hooker: Mal Cochrane (Manly-Warringah)
- Coach: Wayne Bennett and Don Furner (Canberra)

== 1988 ==
- Player of the Year: Gavin Miller (Cronulla)
- Fullback: Garry Jack (Balmain)
- Winger: John Ferguson (Canberra)
- Centre: Michael O’Connor (Manly-Warringah)
- Five-eighth: Wally Lewis (Brisbane)
- Halfback: Allan Langer (Brisbane)
- Lock: Wayne Pearce (Balmain)
- Second row: Gavin Miller (Cronulla)
- Prop: Sam Backo (Canberra)
- Hooker: Ben Elias (Balmain)
- Coach: Phil Gould (Canterbury)
- Top tryscorer: John Ferguson (Canberra)
- Top pointscorer: Gary Belcher (Canberra)

== 1989 ==
- Player of the Year: Gavin Miller (Cronulla)
- Fullback: Gary Belcher (Canberra)
- Winger: Michael Hancock (Brisbane)
- Centre: Tony Currie (Brisbane)
- Five-eighth: Phil Blake (South Sydney)
- Halfback: Greg Alexander (Penrith)
- Lock: Bradley Clyde (Canberra)
- Second row: Gavin Miller (Cronulla)
- Prop: Steve Roach (Balmain)
- Hooker: Kerrod Walters (Brisbane)
- Coach: George Piggins (South Sydney)

== 1990 ==
- Player of the Year: Cliff Lyons (Manly-Warringah)
- Fullback: Gary Belcher (Canberra)
- Winger: Ashley Gordon (Newcastle)
- Centre: Mal Meninga (Canberra)
- Five-eighth: Cliff Lyons (Manly-Warringah)
- Halfback: Ricky Stuart (Canberra)
- Lock: Bradley Clyde (Canberra)
- Second row: Paul Sironen (Balmain)
- Prop: Martin Bella (Manly-Warringah)
- Hooker: Kerrod Walters (Brisbane)
- Captain: Gene Miles (Brisbane)
- Coach: Tim Sheens (Canberra)

== 1991 ==
- Player of the Year: Michael Potter (St George)
- Fullback: Michael Potter (St George)
- Winger: Rod Wishart (Illawarra)
- Centre: Mal Meninga (Canberra)
- Five-eighth: Terry Lamb (Canterbury)
- Halfback: Greg Alexander (Penrith)
- Lock: Des Hasler (Manly-Warringah)
- Second row: John Cartwright (Penrith)
- Prop: Craig Salvatori (Eastern Suburbs)
- Hooker: Steve Walters (Canberra)
- Coach: Warren Ryan (Western Suburbs)

== 1992 ==
- Player of the Year: Gary Freeman (Eastern Suburbs)
- Fullback: Michael Potter (St George)
- Winger: Willie Carne (Brisbane)
- Centre: Brad Fittler (Penrith)
- Five-eighth: Terry Lamb (Canterbury)
- Halfback: Gary Freeman (Eastern Suburbs)
- Lock: Ian Russell (Illawarra)
- Second row: John Cartwright (Penrith)
- Prop: Glenn Lazarus (Brisbane)
- Hooker: Ben Elias (Balmain)
- Captain: Michael Beattie (St George)
- Coach: Graham Murray (Illawarra)
- Rookie: Matthew Rodwell (Newcastle)

== 1993 ==
- Player of the Year: Ricky Stuart (Canberra)
- Silver Dally M: Ian Roberts (Manly-Warringah)
- Bronze Dally M: Mitch Healey (Cronulla)
- Fullback: Rod Silva (Eastern Suburbs)
- Wing: Noa Nadruku (Canberra)
- Centre: Brad Fittler (Penrith)
- Five-eighth: Terry Lamb (Canterbury)
- Halfback: Ricky Stuart (Canberra)
- Prop: Ian Roberts (Manly-Warringah)
- Hooker: Steve Walters (Canberra)
- Second row: Bob Lindner (Illawarra)
- Lock: Jim Dymock (Canterbury)
- Captain: Michael Potter (St George)
- Coach: Chris Anderson (Canterbury)
- Provan-Summons Medal (People's Choice): Ricky Stuart (Canberra)
- Rookie: Jack Elsegood (Manly-Warringah)
- Representative player: Paul Sironen (City Origin, NSW and Australia)
- Top tryscorer: Noa Nadruku (Canberra)
- Top pointscorer: Daryl Halligan (North Sydney)
- Junior Dally M: Kris Flint (St Gregory's College, Campbelltown)

== 1994 ==
- Player of the Year: Cliff Lyons (Manly-Warringah)
- Silver Dally M: Jim Serdaris (Western Suburbs)
- Bronze Dally M: Allan Langer (Brisbane)
- Fullback: Brett Mullins (Canberra)
- Wing: Daryl Halligan (Canterbury)
- Centre: Andrew Ettingshausen (Cronulla)
- Five-eighth: Cliff Lyons (Manly-Warringah)
- Halfback: Allan Langer (Brisbane)
- Prop: Ian Roberts (Manly-Warringah)
- Hooker: Jim Serdaris (Western Suburbs)
- Second row: Steve Menzies (Manly-Warringah)
- Lock: Brad Fittler (Penrith)
- Captain: Mal Meninga (Canberra)
- Coach: Peter Louis (North Sydney)
- Provan-Summons Medal (People's Choice): Bradley Clyde (Canberra)
- Rookie: Steve Menzies (Manly-Warringah)
- Representative player: Ben Elias (NSW)
- Top tryscorer: Steve Renouf (Brisbane)
- Top pointscorer: Daryl Halligan (Canterbury)
- Junior Dally M: Michael Withers (John Paul II, Marayong)

== 1995 ==
- Player of the Year: Paul Green (Cronulla)
- Silver Dally M: Cliff Lyons (Manly-Warringah)
- Bronze Dally M: Andrew Johns (Newcastle)
- Fullback: Matthew Ridge (Manly-Warringah)
- Winger: Sean Hoppe (Auckland)
- Centre: Jamie Ainscough (Newcastle)
- Five-eighth: Laurie Daley (Canberra)
- Halfback: Paul Green (Cronulla)
- Lock: Jim Dymock (Canterbury)
- Second row: Steven Menzies (Manly-Warringah)
- Prop: Danny Lee (Cronulla)
- Hooker: Steve Walters (Canberra)
- Captain: Paul Langmack (Western Suburbs)
- Coach: John Lang (Cronulla)
- Provan-Summons Medal (People's Choice): Terry Lamb (Canterbury)
- Rookie: Mat Rogers (Cronulla)
- Top tryscorer: Steven Menzies (Manly-Warringah)
- Top pointscorer: Matthew Ridge (Manly-Warringah)
- Junior Dally M: Nathan Cayless (Parramatta Marist Brothers)

== 1996 ==
- Player of the Year: Allan Langer (Brisbane)
- Silver Dally M: Laurie Daley (Canberra)
- Bronze Dally M: Jim Dymock (Parramatta)
- Fullback: Tim Brasher (Balmain)
- Winger: Noa Nadruku (Canberra)
- Centre: Andrew Ettingshausen (Cronulla)
- Five-eighth: Laurie Daley (Canberra)
- Halfback: Allan Langer (Brisbane)
- Lock: Jim Dymock (Parramatta)
- Second row: David Fairleigh (North Sydney)
- Prop: Paul Harragon (Newcastle)
- Hooker: Jim Serdaris (Manly-Warringah)
- Captain: Laurie Daley (Canberra)
- Coach: David Waite (St George)
- Provan-Summons Medal (People's Choice): Laurie Daley (Canberra)
- Rookie: Glenn Morrison (Balmain)
- Top tryscorer: Noa Nadruku (Canberra)
- Top pointscorer: Jason Taylor (North Sydney)
- Junior Dally M: Chris Smith (John Paul II Marayong)

== 1997 ==
Not awarded

- Provan-Summons Medal (People's Choice): Brad Fittler (Sydney Roosters)

== 1998 ==
- Player of the Year: Andrew Johns (Newcastle)
- Fullback: Darren Lockyer (Brisbane)
- Winger: Marcus Bai (Melbourne)
- Centre: Darren Smith (Brisbane)
- Five-eighth: Brad Fittler (Sydney Roosters)
- Halfback: Andrew Johns (Newcastle)
- Lock: Tawera Nikau (Melbourne)
- Second row: Steven Menzies (Manly-Warringah)
- Prop: Dean Pay (Parramatta)
- Hooker: Jason Hetherington (Canterbury)
- Coach: Chris Anderson (Melbourne)
- Rookie: Mark McLinden (Canberra)
- Top pointscorer: Ivan Cleary (Sydney Roosters)
- Provan-Summons Medal (People's Choice): Andrew Johns (Newcastle)

== 1999 ==
- Player of the Year: Andrew Johns (Newcastle)
- Fullback: David Peachey (Cronulla)
- Winger: Nathan Blacklock (St George Illawarra)
- Centre: Ryan Girdler (Penrith)
- Five-eighth: Brad Fittler (Sydney Roosters)
- Halfback: Andrew Johns (Newcastle)
- Lock: Jason Smith (Parramatta)
- Second row: Gorden Tallis (Brisbane)
- Prop: Matt Parsons (South Sydney)
- Hooker: Geoff Toovey (Manly-Warringah)
- Coach: John Lang (Cronulla)
- Captain: Brad Fittler (Sydney Roosters)
- Representative: Mat Rogers (Cronulla & Queensland)
- Rookie: Michael Vella (Parramatta)
- Top try-scorer: Nathan Blacklock (St George Illawarra)
- Top point-scorer: Matt Geyer (Melbourne)
- Provan-Summons Medal (People's Choice): Andrew Johns (Newcastle)

== 2000 ==
- Player of the Year: Trent Barrett (St George Illawarra)
- Fullback: David Peachey (Cronulla)
- Winger: Nathan Blacklock (St George Illawarra)
- Centre: Ryan Girdler (Penrith)
- Five-eighth: Trent Barrett (St George Illawarra)
- Halfback: Brett Kimmorley (Melbourne)
- Lock: Jason Croker (Canberra)
- Second row: Nathan Hindmarsh (Parramatta)
- Prop: Shane Webcke (Brisbane)
- Hooker: Craig Gower (Penrith)
- Coach: Wayne Bennett (Brisbane)
- Captain: Kevin Walters (Brisbane)
- Representative: Ryan Girdler (New South Wales) & (Penrith)
- Rookie: Tasesa Lavea (Melbourne)
- Top tryscorer: Nathan Blacklock (St George Illawarra)
- Top pointscorer: Joel Caine (Wests Tigers)
- Provan-Summons Medal (People's Choice): Andrew Johns (Newcastle)

== 2001 ==
- Player of the Year: Preston Campbell (Cronulla)
- Fullback: Darren Lockyer (Brisbane)
- Winger: Nathan Blacklock (St George Illawarra)
- Centre: Nigel Vagana (Canterbury)
- Five-eighth: Adam Dykes (Cronulla)
- Halfback: Preston Campbell (Cronulla)
- Lock: Daniel Wagon (Parramatta)
- Second row: Nathan Hindmarsh (Parramatta)
- Prop: Shane Webcke (Brisbane)
- Hooker: Brad Drew (Parramatta)
- Captain: David Peachey (Cronulla)
- Coach: Brian Smith (Parramatta)
- Rookie: Braith Anasta (Canterbury)
- Representative Player: Darren Lockyer (Queensland & Australia)
- Top tryscorer: Nathan Blacklock (St George Illawarra)
- Top pointscorer: Ben Walker (Northern Eagles)
- Provan-Summons Medal (People's Choice): Andrew Johns (Newcastle)

== 2002 ==
- Player of the Year: Andrew Johns (Newcastle)
- Fullback: Darren Lockyer (Brisbane)
- Winger: Lote Tuqiri (Brisbane)
- Centre: Nigel Vagana (Canterbury)
- Five-eighth: Brad Fittler (Sydney Roosters)
- Halfback: Andrew Johns (Newcastle)
- Lock: Steve Menzies (Northern Eagles)
- Second row: Ali Lauiti'iti (Warriors)
- Prop: Shane Webcke (Brisbane)
- Hooker: Danny Buderus (Newcastle)
- Captain: Steve Price (Canterbury)
- Coach: Daniel Anderson (Warriors)
- Rookie: Matt Utai (Canterbury)
- Representative Player: Danny Buderus (NSW & Australia)
- Top pointscorer: Hazem El Masri (Canterbury)
- Provan-Summons Medal (People's Choice): Andrew Johns (Newcastle)

== 2003 ==
Not Awarded

- Top tryscorer: Rhys Wesser (Penrith)
- Top pointscorer: Hazem El Masri (Canterbury)
- Rookie: Billy Slater (Melbourne)

== 2004 ==
- Player: Danny Buderus (Newcastle)
- Fullback: Anthony Minichiello (Sydney Roosters)
- Winger: Amos Roberts (Penrith)
- Centre: Willie Tonga (Canterbury)
- Five-eighth: Darren Lockyer (Brisbane)
- Halfback: Brett Finch (Sydney Roosters)
- Lock: Shaun Timmins (St George Illawarra)
- Second row: Nathan Hindmarsh (Parramatta)
- Prop: Paul Rauhihi (North Queensland)
- Hooker: Danny Buderus (Newcastle)
- Captain: Steve Price (Canterbury)
- Coach: Steve Folkes (Canterbury)
- Rookie: Karmichael Hunt (Brisbane)
- Representative Player: Craig Fitzgibbon (NSW & Australia)
- Top pointscorer: Hazem El Masri (Canterbury)
- Provan-Summons Medal (People's Choice): Darren Lockyer (Brisbane)
- Peter Frilingos Memorial Award: Billy Slater (Melbourne Storm)

== 2005 ==
- Player of the Year: Johnathan Thurston (North Queensland)
- Fullback: Brett Hodgson (Wests Tigers)
- Winger: Eric Grothe (Parramatta)
- Centre: Mark Gasnier (St George Illawarra)
- Five-eighth: Braith Anasta (Canterbury)
- Halfback: Johnathan Thurston (North Queensland)
- Lock: Ben Kennedy (Manly-Warringah)
- Second row: Nathan Hindmarsh (Parramatta)
- Prop: Luke Bailey (St George Illawarra)
- Hooker: Danny Buderus (Newcastle)
- Captain: Scott Prince (Wests Tigers)
- Coach: Tim Sheens (Wests Tigers)
- Rookie: Tim Smith (Parramatta)
- Representative Player: Andrew Johns (NSW & Australia)
- Top tryscorer: Billy Slater (Melbourne); Shaun Berrigan (Brisbane)
- Top pointscorer: Brett Hodgson (Wests Tigers)
- Provan-Summons Medal (People's Choice): Nathan Hindmarsh (Parramatta)
- Peter Frilingos Memorial Award: Andrew Johns (NSW)

== 2006 ==
- Player of the Year: Cameron Smith (Melbourne)
- Fullback: Clinton Schifcofske (Canberra)
- Winger: Brian Carney (Newcastle)
- Centre: Mark Gasnier (St George Illawarra)
- Five-eighth: Darren Lockyer (Brisbane)
- Halfback: Cooper Cronk (Melbourne)
- Lock: Ben Kennedy (Manly-Warringah)
- Second row: Nathan Hindmarsh (Parramatta)
- Prop: Roy Asotasi (Canterbury)
- Hooker: Cameron Smith (Melbourne)
- Captain: Ben Kennedy (Manly-Warringah)
- Coach: Craig Bellamy (Melbourne)
- Rookie: Jarryd Hayne (Parramatta)
- Representative Player: Darren Lockyer (Queensland & Australia)
- Top tryscorer: Nathan Merritt (South Sydney)
- Top pointscorer: Hazem El Masri (Canterbury)
- Provan-Summons Medal (People's Choice): Nathan Hindmarsh (Parramatta)
- Peter Frilingos Memorial Award: Brett Finch (NSW)

== 2007 ==
- Player of the Year: Johnathan Thurston (North Queensland)
- Fullback: Matt Bowen (North Queensland)
- Winger: Jarryd Hayne (Parramatta)
- Centre: Justin Hodges (Brisbane)
- Five-eighth: Darren Lockyer (Brisbane)
- Halfback: Johnathan Thurston (North Queensland)
- Lock: Dallas Johnson (Melbourne)
- Second row: Anthony Watmough (Manly-Warringah)
- Prop: Steve Price (Warriors)
- Hooker: Robbie Farah (Wests Tigers)
- Captain: Steve Price (Warriors)
- Coach: Craig Bellamy (Melbourne)
- Representative player: Cameron Smith (Queensland and Australia)
- Top tryscorer: Matt Bowen (North Queensland) and Israel Folau (Melbourne)
- Top pointscorer: Hazem El Masri (Canterbury)
- Rookie: Israel Folau (Melbourne)
- Provan-Summons Medal (People's Choice): Nathan Hindmarsh (Parramatta)
- Peter Frilingos Memorial Award: Braith Anasta (Sydney Roosters)

== 2008 ==
- Player of the Year: Matt Orford (Manly-Warringah)
- Fullback: Billy Slater (Melbourne)
- Winger: Colin Best (Canberra)
- Centre: Israel Folau (Melbourne)
- Five-eighth: Greg Inglis (Melbourne)
- Halfback: Matt Orford (Manly-Warringah)
- Lock: Alan Tongue (Canberra)
- Second row: Glenn Stewart (Manly-Warringah)
- Prop: Petero Civoniceva (Penrith)
- Hooker: Cameron Smith (Melbourne)
- Captain: Alan Tongue (Canberra)
- Coach: Neil Henry (Canberra)
- Rookie: Chris Sandow (South Sydney)
- Representative player: Greg Inglis (Queensland and Australia)
- Top tryscorer: Brett Stewart (Manly-Warringah)
- Top pointscorer: Luke Covell (Cronulla)
- Toyota Cup Player of the Year: Ben Hunt (Brisbane)
- Provan-Summons Medal (People's Choice): Nathan Hindmarsh (Parramatta)
- Peter Frilingos Memorial Award: Greg Inglis (Australia)

== 2009 ==
- Player of the Year: Jarryd Hayne (Parramatta)
- Fullback: Jarryd Hayne (Parramatta)
- Winger: Taniela Tuiaki (Wests Tigers)
- Centre: Josh Morris (Canterbury)
- Five-eighth: Jamie Soward (St George Illawarra)
- Halfback: Johnathan Thurston (North Queensland)
- Lock: David Stagg (Canterbury)
- Second row: Anthony Watmough (Manly-Warringah)
- Prop: Ben Hannant (Canterbury)
- Hooker: Michael Ennis (Canterbury)
- Captain: Andrew Ryan (Canterbury)
- Coach: Kevin Moore (Canterbury)
- Rookie: Jamal Idris (Canterbury)
- Representative player: Greg Inglis (Queensland and Australia)
- Top tryscorer: Brett Morris (St George Illawarra)
- Top pointscorer: Hazem El Masri (Canterbury)
- Toyota Cup Player of the Year: Beau Henry (St George Illawarra)
- Provan-Summons Medal (People's Choice): Jamie Soward (St George Illawarra)
- Peter Frilingos Memorial Award: Nathan Merritt (South Sydney)

== 2010 ==
- Player of the Year: Todd Carney (Sydney Roosters)
- Fullback: Darius Boyd (St George Illawarra)
- Winger: Akuila Uate (Newcastle)
- Centre: Jamie Lyon (Manly-Warringah)
- Five-eighth: Todd Carney (Sydney Roosters)
- Halfback: Scott Prince (Gold Coast)
- Lock: Luke Lewis (Penrith)
- Second row: Sam Thaiday (Brisbane)
- Prop: David Shillington (Canberra)
- Hooker: Robbie Farah (Wests Tigers)
- Captain: Braith Anasta (Sydney Roosters)
- Coach: Brian Smith (Sydney Roosters)
- Rookie: Matt Gillett (Brisbane)
- Representative player: Billy Slater (Queensland and Australia)
- Top tryscorer: Akuila Uate (Newcastle)
- Top pointscorer: Michael Gordon (Penrith)
- Toyota Cup Player of the Year: Tariq Sims (Brisbane)
- Provan-Summons Medal (People's Choice): Todd Carney (Sydney Roosters)
- Peter Frilingos Memorial Award: Jarryd Hayne (Parramatta Eels)

== 2011 ==
- Player of the Year: Billy Slater (Melbourne)
- Fullback: Billy Slater (Melbourne)
- Winger: Akuila Uate (Newcastle)
- Centre: Jamie Lyon (Manly-Warringah)
- Five-eighth: Benji Marshall (Wests Tigers)
- Halfback: Cooper Cronk (Melbourne)
- Lock: Paul Gallen (Sharks)
- Second row: Sam Thaiday (Brisbane)
- Prop: Matt Scott (North Queensland)
- Hooker: Cameron Smith (Melbourne)
- Captain: Cameron Smith (Melbourne)
- Coach: Craig Bellamy (Melbourne)
- Rookie: Daly Cherry-Evans (Manly-Warringah)
- Representative player: Cameron Smith (Queensland and Australia)
- Top tryscorer: Ben Barba (Canterbury-Bankstown Bulldogs) and Nathan Merritt (South Sydney Rabbitohs)
- Top pointscorer: Chris Sandow (South Sydney Rabbitohs)
- Toyota Cup Player of the Year: Jack De Belin (St George Illawarra)
- Provan-Summons Medal Nathan Hindmarsh (Parramatta)
- Peter Frilingos Memorial Award: Paul Gallen (Cronulla Sharks and NSW)

== 2012 ==
- Player of the Year: Ben Barba (Canterbury-Bankstown Bulldogs)
- Fullback: Ben Barba (Canterbury-Bankstown Bulldogs)
- Winger: Akuila Uate (Newcastle)
- Centre: Josh Morris (Canterbury-Bankstown Bulldogs)
- Five-eighth: Johnathan Thurston (North Queensland)
- Halfback: Cooper Cronk (Melbourne)
- Lock: Paul Gallen (Sharks)
- Second row: Nate Myles (Gold Coast Titans)
- Prop: Sam Kasiano (Canterbury-Bankstown Bulldogs)
- Hooker: Cameron Smith (Melbourne)
- Captain: Jamie Lyon and Jason King (Manly-Warringah)
- Coach: Des Hasler (Canterbury-Bankstown Bulldogs)
- Rookie: Adam Reynolds (South Sydney Rabbitohs)
- Representative player: Nate Myles (Queensland
- Top tryscorer: Ben Barba (Canterbury-Bankstown Bulldogs) and Ashley Graham (North Queensland)
- Top pointscorer: Jarrod Croker (Canberra Raiders)
- Toyota Cup Player of the Year: David Klemmer (Canterbury-Bankstown Bulldogs)
- Provan-Summons Medal Ben Barba (Canterbury-Bankstown Bulldogs)
- Peter Frilingos Memorial Award: Ben Barba (Canterbury-Bankstown Bulldogs)

== 2013 ==
- Player of the Year: Cooper Cronk (Melbourne Storm)
- Fullback: Greg Inglis (South Sydney Rabbitohs)
- Winger: Roger Tuivasa-Sheck (Sydney Roosters)
- Centre: Jamie Lyon (Manly-Warringah)
- Five-eighth: Johnathan Thurston (North Queensland) and Todd Carney (Cronulla Sharks)
- Halfback: Cooper Cronk (Melbourne)
- Lock: Corey Parker (Brisbane)
- Second row: Boyd Cordner (Sydney Roosters)
- Prop: Andrew Fifita (Cronulla Sharks)
- Hooker: Cameron Smith (Melbourne)
- Captain: Cameron Smith
- Coach: Trent Robinson (Sydney Roosters)
- Rookie: George Burgess (South Sydney Rabbitohs)
- Representative player: Cameron Smith
- Top tryscorer: David Williams (Manly-Warringah) and James McManus (Newcastle) and David Simmons (Penrith)
- Top pointscorer: James Maloney (Sydney Roosters)
- Holden Cup Player of the Year: Bryce Cartwright (Penrith)
- Provan-Summons Medal: Greg Inglis
- Peter Frilingos Memorial Award: The four Burgess brothers (Sam, Luke, Thomas and George) playing together for the first time for South Sydney v Wests Tigers

== 2014 ==
- Player of the Year: Jarryd Hayne (Parramatta Eels) and Johnathan Thurston (North Queensland)
- Fullback: Jarryd Hayne (Parramatta Eels)
- Winger: Semi Radradra (Parramatta Eels)
- Centre: Jamie Lyon (Manly-Warringah)
- Five-eighth: Johnathan Thurston (North Queensland)
- Halfback: Daly Cherry-Evans (Manly-Warringah)
- Lock: Sam Burgess (South Sydney Rabbitohs)
- Second row: Beau Scott (Newcastle Knights)
- Prop: James Graham (Canterbury-Bankstown Bulldogs)
- Hooker: James Segeyaro (Penrith Panthers)
- Captain: Jamie Lyon (Manly-Warringah)
- Coach: Ivan Cleary (Penrith Panthers)
- Rookie: Luke Brooks (Wests Tigers)
- Representative player: Jarryd Hayne (NSW & Australia)
- Top tryscorer: Jarryd Hayne (Parramatta Eels)
- Top pointscorer: Johnathan Thurston (North Queensland)
- Holden Cup Player of the Year: Kane Elgey (Gold Coast Titans)
- Provan-Summons Medal: Johnathan Thurston (North Queensland)
- Peter Frilingos Memorial Award: NSW Blues win Origin after nine years

== 2015 ==
- Player of the Year: Johnathan Thurston (North Queensland)
- Fullback: Roger Tuivasa-Sheck (Sydney Roosters)
- Winger: Semi Radradra (Parramatta Eels)
- Centre: James Roberts (Gold Coast Titans)
- Five-eighth: Blake Austin (Canberra Raiders)
- Halfback: Johnathan Thurston (North Queensland)
- Lock: Jason Taumalolo (North Queensland)
- Second row: Josh Jackson (Canterbury-Bankstown Bulldogs)
- Prop: Aaron Woods (Wests Tigers)
- Hooker: Michael Ennis (Cronulla Sharks)
- Captain: Johnathan Thurston and Matt Scott (North Queensland)
- Coach: Wayne Bennett (Brisbane Broncos)
- Rookie: Jack Bird (Cronulla Sharks)
- Representative player: Corey Parker (QLD & Australia)
- Top tryscorer: Semi Radradra (Parramatta Eels)
- Top pointscorer: Jarrod Croker (Canberra Raiders)
- Holden Cup Player of the Year: Ashley Taylor (Brisbane Broncos)
- Provan-Summons Medal: Johnathan Thurston (North Queensland)
- Peter Frilingos Memorial Award: Nathan Friend (New Zealand Warriors)
- Female Player of the Year: Jenni Sue-Hoepper (Jillaroos)

== 2016 ==
- Player of the Year: Cooper Cronk (Melbourne Storm); Jason Taumalolo (North Queensland Cowboys)
- Fullback: James Tedesco (Wests Tigers)
- Winger: Josh Mansour (Penrith Panthers)
- Centre: Joey Leilua (Canberra Raiders)
- Five-eighth: James Maloney (Cronulla-Sutherland Sharks)
- Halfback: Cooper Cronk (Melbourne Storm)
- Lock: Jason Taumalolo (North Queensland Cowboys)
- Second row: Matt Gillett (Brisbane Broncos)
- Prop: Jesse Bromwich (Melbourne Storm)
- Hooker: Cameron Smith (Melbourne Storm)
- Captain: Jarrod Croker (Canberra Raiders)
- Coach: Ricky Stuart (Canberra Raiders)
- Rookie: Ashley Taylor (Gold Coast Titans)
- Representative player: Cameron Smith (QLD & Australia)
- Top tryscorer: Suliasi Vunivalu (Melbourne Storm)
- Top pointscorer: Jarrod Croker (Canberra Raiders)
- Holden Cup Player of the Year: Jayden Brailey (Cronulla-Sutherland Sharks)
- Provan-Summons Medal: Jarrod Croker (Canberra Raiders)
- Peter Frilingos Memorial Award: Anthony Milford (Brisbane Broncos)
- Female Player of the Year: Kezie Apps (Jillaroos)

== 2017 ==
- Player of the Year: Cameron Smith (Melbourne Storm)
- Fullback: Billy Slater (Melbourne Storm)
- Winger: Jordan Rapana (Canberra Raiders)
- Centre: Dylan Walker (Manly-Warringah Sea Eagles)
- Five-eighth: Gareth Widdop (St George Illawarra Dragons)
- Halfback: Michael Morgan (North Queensland Cowboys)
- Lock: Paul Gallen (Cronulla Sharks)
- Second row: Matt Gillett (Brisbane Broncos)
- Prop: Aaron Woods (Wests Tigers)
- Hooker: Cameron Smith (Melbourne Storm)
- Interchange: Reagan Campbell-Gillard (Penrith Panthers)
- Captain: Cameron Smith (Melbourne Storm)
- Coach: Craig Bellamy (Melbourne Storm)
- Rookie: Nick Cotric (Canberra Raiders)
- Representative player: Not awarded
- Top tryscorer: Suliasi Vunivalu (Melbourne Storm)
- Top pointscorer: Nathan Cleary (Penrith Panthers)
- Holden Cup Player of the Year: Jake Clifford (North Queensland Cowboys)
- Provan-Summons Medal: Clint Gutherson (Parramatta Eels)
- Peter Frilingos Memorial Award: Mitchell Pearce (Sydney Roosters)
- Female Player of the Year: Simaima Taufa (Jillaroos)

== 2018 ==
- Player of the Year: Roger Tuivasa-Sheck (New Zealand Warriors)
- Fullback: Roger Tuivasa-Sheck (New Zealand Warriors)
- Winger: Blake Ferguson (Sydney Roosters)
- Centre: Joseph Leilua (Canberra Raiders)
- Five-eighth: Cameron Munster (Melbourne Storm)
- Halfback: Luke Brooks (Wests Tigers)
- Lock: Jason Taumalolo (North Queensland Cowboys)
- Second row: Josh Jackson (Canterbury Bulldogs)
- Prop: Andrew Fifita (Cronulla Sharks)
- Hooker: Damien Cook (South Sydney Rabbitohs)
- Interchange: Jazz Tevaga (New Zealand Warriors)
- Captain: Cameron Smith (Melbourne Storm)
- Coach: Anthony Seibold (South Sydney Rabbitohs)
- Rookie: Jamayne Isaako (Brisbane Broncos)
- Top tryscorer: David Fusitua (New Zealand Warriors)
- Top pointscorer: Jamayne Isaako (Brisbane Broncos)
- Provan-Summons Medal: Damien Cook (South Sydney Rabbitohs)
- Ken Stephen Medal: Ryan James (Gold Coast Titans)
- Peter Frilingos Memorial Award: The inaugural Women's State of Origin
- Female Player of the Year: Brittany Breayley (Brisbane Broncos)

== 2019 ==
- Player of the Year: James Tedesco (Sydney Roosters)
- Fullback: James Tedesco (Sydney Roosters)
- Winger: Ken Maumalo (New Zealand Warriors)
- Centre: Latrell Mitchell (Sydney Roosters)
- Five-eighth: Cameron Munster (Melbourne Storm)
- Halfback: Mitchell Moses (Parramatta Eels)
- Lock: Cameron Murray (South Sydney Rabbitohs)
- Second row: John Bateman (Canberra Raiders)
- Prop: Payne Haas (Brisbane Broncos)
- Hooker: Cameron Smith (Melbourne Storm)
- Interchange: Brandon Smith (Melbourne Storm)
- Captain: Cameron Smith (Melbourne Storm)
- Coach: Craig Bellamy (Melbourne Storm)
- Rookie: Payne Haas (Brisbane Broncos)
- Top tryscorer: Maika Sivo (Parramatta Eels)
- Top pointscorer: Latrell Mitchell (Sydney Roosters)
- Provan-Summons Medal: Josh Jackson (Canterbury-Bankstown Bulldogs)
- Ken Stephen Medal: Iosia Soliola (Canberra Raiders)
- Peter Frilingos Memorial Award: James Tedesco's State of Origin series winning try
- Female Player of the Year: Jessica Sergis (St. George Illawarra Dragons)

== 2020 ==
- Player of the Year: Jack Wighton (Canberra Raiders)
- Fullback: Clint Gutherson (Parramatta Eels)
- Wingers: David Nofoaluma (Wests Tigers) & Josh Addo-Carr (Melbourne Storm)
- Centres: Kotoni Staggs (Brisbane Broncos) & Stephen Crichton (Penrith Panthers)
- Five-eighth: Jack Wighton (Canberra Raiders)
- Halfback: Nathan Cleary (Penrith Panthers)
- Lock: Isaah Yeo (Penrith Panthers)
- Second rows: Viliame Kikau (Penrith Panthers) & Tohu Harris (New Zealand Warriors)
- Props: Josh Papalii (Canberra Raiders) & James Fisher-Harris (Penrith Panthers)
- Hooker: Cameron Smith (Melbourne Storm)
- Captain: Roger Tuivasa-Sheck (New Zealand Warriors)
- Coach: Ivan Cleary (Penrith Panthers)
- Rookie: Harry Grant (Wests Tigers)
- Top tryscorer: Alex Johnston (South Sydney Rabbitohs)
- Top pointscorer: Adam Reynolds (South Sydney Rabbitohs)
- Provan-Summons Medal: (New Zealand Warriors)
- Peter Frilingos Memorial Award: "Project Apollo", the NRL's restart project, succeeding
- Female Player of the Year: Ali Brigginshaw (Brisbane Broncos)

== 2021 ==
- Player of the Year: Tom Trbojevic (Manly Warringah Sea Eagles)
- Fullback: Tom Trbojevic (Manly Warringah Sea Eagles)
- Wingers: Reuben Garrick (Manly Warringah Sea Eagles) & Brian To'o (Penrith Panthers)
- Centres: Justin Olam (Melbourne Storm) & Matt Burton (Penrith Panthers)
- Five-eighth: Cody Walker (South Sydney Rabbitohs)
- Halfback: Nathan Cleary (Penrith Panthers)
- Lock: Isaah Yeo (Penrith Panthers)
- Second rows: Viliame Kikau (Penrith Panthers) & Isaiah Papali'i (Parramatta Eels)
- Props: James Fisher-Harris (Penrith Panthers) & Payne Haas (Brisbane Broncos)
- Hooker: Brandon Smith (Melbourne Storm)
- Captain: James Tedesco (Sydney Roosters)
- Coach: Craig Bellamy (Melbourne Storm)
- Rookie: Sam Walker (Sydney Roosters)
- Top tryscorer: Alex Johnston (South Sydney Rabbitohs)
- Top pointscorer: Reuben Garrick (Manly Warringah Sea Eagles)
- Provan-Summons Medal: Josh Morris (Sydney Roosters)
- Peter Frilingos Memorial Award: Melbourne Storm winning 19 matches in a row

== 2022 ==
- Player of the Year: Nicho Hynes (Cronulla-Sutherland Sharks)
- Fullback: James Tedesco (Sydney Roosters)
- Wingers: Joseph Sua'ali'i (Sydney Roosters) & Alex Johnston (South Sydney Rabbitohs)
- Centres: Joseph Manu (Sydney Roosters) & Valentine Holmes (North Queensland Cowboys)
- Five-eighth: Cameron Munster (Melbourne Storm)
- Halfback: Nicho Hynes (Cronulla-Sutherland Sharks)
- Lock: Isaah Yeo (Penrith Panthers)
- Second rows: Jeremiah Nanai (North Queensland Cowboys) & Viliame Kikau (Penrith Panthers)
- Props: Payne Haas (Brisbane Broncos) & Joseph Tapine (Canberra Raiders)
- Hooker: Apisai Koroisau (Penrith Panthers)
- Captain: Isaah Yeo (Penrith Panthers)
- Coach: Todd Payten (North Queensland Cowboys)
- Rookie: Jeremiah Nanai (North Queensland Cowboys)
- Top tryscorer: Alex Johnston (South Sydney Rabbitohs)
- Top pointscorer: Valentine Holmes (North Queensland Cowboys)
- Provan-Summons Medal: Nicho Hynes (Cronulla-Sutherland Sharks)
- Female Player of the Year: Raecene McGregor (Sydney Roosters Women)

== 2023 ==
- Player of the Year: Kalyn Ponga (Newcastle Knights)
- Fullback: Kalyn Ponga (Newcastle Knights)
- Wingers: Dallin Watene-Zelezniak (New Zealand Warriors) & Jamayne Isaako (The Dolphins)
- Centres: Stephen Crichton (Penrith Panthers) & Herbie Farnworth (Brisbane Broncos)
- Five-eighth: Ezra Mam (Brisbane Broncos)
- Halfback: Shaun Johnson (New Zealand Warriors)
- Lock: Patrick Carrigan (Brisbane Broncos)
- Second-rows: Liam Martin (Penrith Panthers) & David Fifita (Gold Coast Titans)
- Props: Payne Haas (Brisbane Broncos) & Addin Fonua-Blake (New Zealand Warriors)
- Hooker: Harry Grant (Melbourne Storm)
- Captain: Adam Reynolds (Brisbane Broncos)
- Coach: Andrew Webster (New Zealand Warriors)
- Rookie: Sunia Turuva (Penrith Panthers)
- Top tryscorer: Jamayne Isaako (The Dolphins)
- Top pointscorer: Jamayne Isaako (The Dolphins)
- Provan-Summons Medal: Nicho Hynes (Cronulla-Sutherland Sharks)
- Female Player of the Year: Tamika Upton (Newcastle Knights Women)

== 2024 ==
- Player of the Year: Jahrome Hughes (Melbourne Storm)
- Fullback: James Tedesco (Sydney Roosters)
- Wingers: Zac Lomax (St. George Illawarra Dragons) & Brian To'o (Penrith Panthers)
- Centres: Stephen Crichton (Canterbury-Bankstown Bulldogs) & Herbie Farnworth (The Dolphins)
- Five-eighth: Tom Dearden (North Queensland Cowboys)
- Halfback: Jahrome Hughes (Melbourne Storm)
- Lock: Isaah Yeo (Penrith Panthers)
- Second-rows: Angus Crichton (Sydney Roosters) & Eliesa Katoa (Melbourne Storm)
- Props: Joseph Tapine (Canberra Raiders) & Addin Fonua-Blake (New Zealand Warriors)
- Hooker: Harry Grant (Melbourne Storm)
- Captain: Stephen Crichton (Canterbury-Bankstown Bulldogs)
- Coach: Craig Bellamy (Melbourne Storm)
- Rookie: Jack Bostock (The Dolphins)
- Top tryscorer: Alofiana Khan-Pereira (Gold Coast Titans)
- Top pointscorer: Valentine Holmes (North Queensland Cowboys)
- Provan-Summons Medal: Nicho Hynes (Cronulla-Sutherland Sharks)
- Female Player of the Year: Olivia Kernick (Sydney Roosters Women)

== 2025 ==
- Player of the Year: James Tedesco (Sydney Roosters)
- Fullback: James Tedesco (Sydney Roosters)
- Wingers: Mark Nawaqanitawase (Sydney Roosters) & Xavier Coates (Melbourne Storm)
- Centres: Kotoni Staggs (Brisbane Broncos) & Stephen Crichton (Canterbury-Bankstown Bulldogs)
- Five-eighth: Ethan Strange (Canberra Raiders)
- Halfback: Nathan Cleary (Penrith Panthers)
- Lock: Erin Clark (New Zealand Warriors)
- Second-rows: Eliesa Katoa (Melbourne Storm) & Hudson Young (Canberra Raiders)
- Props: Addin Fonua-Blake (Cronulla-Sutherland Sharks) & Payne Haas (Brisbane Broncos)
- Hooker: Blayke Brailey (Cronulla-Sutherland Sharks)
- Captain: James Tedesco (Sydney Roosters)
- Coach: Ricky Stuart (Canberra Raiders)
- Rookie: Robert Toia (Sydney Roosters)
- Top tryscorer: Mark Nawaqanitawase (Sydney Roosters)
- Top pointscorer: Jamayne Isaako (Dolphins)
- Provan-Summons Medal: Zac Lomax (Parramatta Eels)
- Female Player of the Year: Tamika Upton (Brisbane Broncos Women)

== 2026 ==
- Player of the Year: Nathan Cleary (Penrith Panthers)
- Fullback: Dylan Edwards (Penrith Panthers)
- Wingers: Thomas Jenkins (Penrith Panthers) & Selwyn Cobbo (Dolphins)
- Centres: Herbie Farnworth (Dolphins) & Robert Toia (Sydney Roosters)
- Five-eighth: Braydon Trindall (Cronulla-Sutherland Sharks)
- Halfback: Nathan Cleary (Penrith Panthers)
- Lock: Erin Clark (New Zealand Warriors)
- Second-rows: Haumole Olakau'atu (Manly Warringah Sea Eagles) & Hamish Stewart (St. George Illawarra Dragons)
- Props: James Fisher-Harris (New Zealand Warriors) & Naufahu Whyte (Sydney Roosters)
- Hooker: Wayde Egan (New Zealand Warriors)
- Captain: James Fisher-Harris (New Zealand Warriors)
- Coach: Andrew Webster (New Zealand Warriors)
- Rookie: Ethan Sanders (Canberra Raiders)
- Top tryscorer: Alex Johnston (South Sydney Rabbitohs) & Thomas Jenkins (Penrith Panthers)
- Top pointscorer: Jamayne Isaako (Dolphins)
- Provan-Summons Medal: Jai Arrow (South Sydney Rabbitohs)
- Female Player of the Year: Tamika Upton (Brisbane Broncos Women)

== See also ==
- Dally M Awards
- Dally M Medal
