= 2013 Manly Warringah Sea Eagles season =

- NRL rank: 4
- 2013 record: Wins: 15; draws: 1; losses: 8
- Points scored: For: 588; against: 366

Team information
- Coach: (Australia) Geoff Toovey
- Captain: Jamie Lyon, Jason King
- Stadium: Brookvale Oval
- Avg. attendance: 13,682
- High attendance: 20,510 (vs South Sydney Rabbitohs, round 7)

Top scorers
- Tries: (Australia) David Williams, (Samoa) Jorge Tafua (20)
- Goals: (Australia) Jamie Lyon (89)
- Points: (Australia) Jamie Lyon (242)
← 2012	2014 →

The 2013 Manly-Warringah Sea Eagles season is the 64th in the club's history since their entry into the then New South Wales Rugby Football League premiership in 1947. The team finished 4th in the regular season and qualified for the finals where they lost to the Sydney Roosters in the 2013 NRL Grand Final.

== Signings/Transfers ==
=== Gains ===
Player	2012 Club	2013 Club	Ref
Richie Fa'aoso	Melbourne Storm	Manly-Warringah Sea Eagles	
Justin Horo	Parramatta Eels	Manly-Warringah Sea Eagles	
Esikeli Tonga	Parramatta Eels	Manly-Warringah Sea Eagles	
David Gower	St. George Illawarra Dragons	Manly-Warringah Sea Eagles	
Tom Symonds	Sydney Roosters	Manly-Warringah Sea Eagles	

=== Losses ===
Player	2012 Club	2013 Club	Ref
Darcy Lussick	Manly-Warringah Sea Eagles	Parramatta Eels	
Michael Oldfield	Manly-Warringah Sea Eagles	Sydney Roosters	
Dean Whare	Manly-Warringah Sea Eagles	Penrith Panthers	
Tony Williams	Manly-Warringah Sea Eagles	Canterbury-Bankstown Bulldogs	

== Ladder ==
2013 NRL season
Pos	Team	Pld	W	D	L	B	PF	PA	PD	Pts
1	Sydney Roosters (P)	24	18	0	6	2	640	325	+315	40
2	South Sydney Rabbitohs	24	18	0	6	2	588	384	+204	40
3	Melbourne Storm	24	16	1	7	2	589	373	+216	37
4	Manly Warringah Sea Eagles	24	15	1	8	2	588	366	+222	35
5	Cronulla-Sutherland Sharks	24	14	0	10	2	468	460	+8	32
6	Canterbury-Bankstown Bulldogs	24	13	0	11	2	529	463	+66	30
7	Newcastle Knights	24	12	1	11	2	528	422	+106	29
8	North Queensland Cowboys	24	12	0	12	2	507	431	+76	28
9	Gold Coast Titans	24	11	0	13	2	500	518	−18	26
10	Penrith Panthers	24	11	0	13	2	495	532	−37	26
11	New Zealand Warriors	24	11	0	13	2	495	554	−59	26
12	Brisbane Broncos	24	10	1	13	2	434	477	−43	25
13	Canberra Raiders	24	10	0	14	2	434	624	−190	24
14	St. George Illawarra Dragons	24	7	0	17	2	379	530	−151	18
15	Wests Tigers	24	7	0	17	2	386	687	−301	18
16	Parramatta Eels	24	5	0	19	2	326	740	−414	14

=== Ladder Progression ===
- Numbers highlighted in green indicate that the team finished the round inside the top 8.
- Numbers highlighted in blue indicates the team finished first on the ladder in that round.
- Numbers highlighted in red indicates the team finished last place on the ladder in that round.
- Underlined numbers indicate that the team had a bye during that round.

	Team	1	2	3	4	5	6	7	8	9	10	11	12	13	14	15	16	17	18	19	20	21	22	23	24	25	26
4	Manly-Warringah Sea Eagles	2	4	4	6	8	10	10	12	12	13	15	17	17	17	19	19	21	23	25	27	29	31	31	33	35	35
