= Michael Potter =

Australian rugby league footballer and coach

Mick Potter
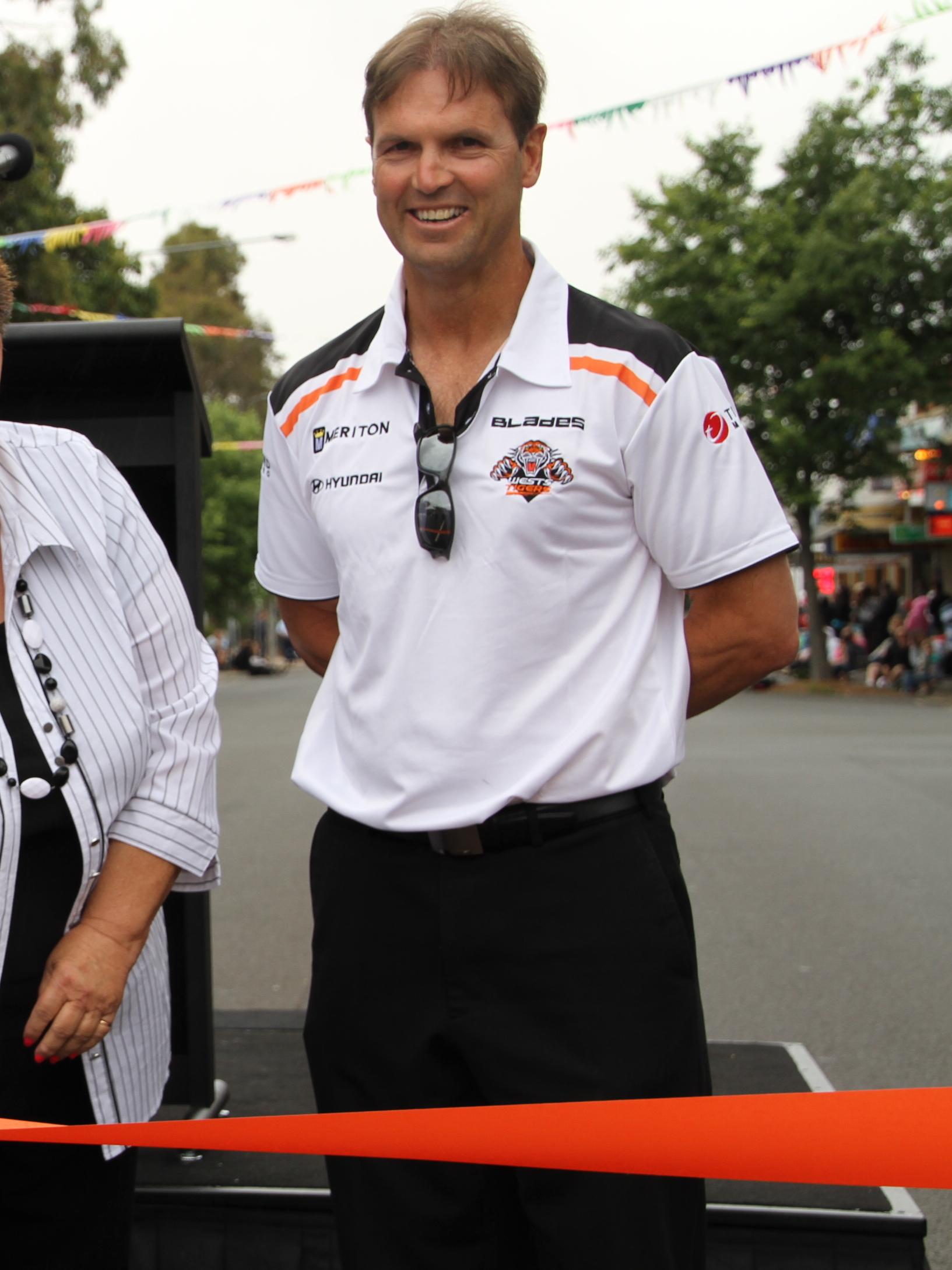

Personal information
- Full name: Michael Potter
- Born: 24 September 1963 (age 63) Parramatta, New South Wales, Australia
- Height: 176 cm (5 ft 9 in)
- Weight: 82 kg (12 st 13 lb)

Playing information
- Position: Fullback
Club
Years	Team	Pld	T	G	FG	P
1983–88	Canterbury Bulldogs	80	14	0	0	56
1989–93	St. George Dragons	100	14	0	0	56
1995–96	Western Reds	21	1	0	0	4
	Total	201	29	0	0	116
Representative
Years	Team	Pld	T	G	FG	P
1990–92	Country Origin	3	0	0	0	0
1984	New South Wales	1	0	0	0	0

Coaching information
Club
Years	Team	Gms	W	D	L	W%
2006–08	Catalans Dragons	89	41	3	45	46
2009–10	St Helens	68	49	0	19	72
2011–12	Bradford Bulls	58	25	3	30	43
2013–14	Wests Tigers	48	17	0	31	35
2022	Canterbury Bulldogs	14	5	0	9	36
	Total	277	137	6	134	49
Representative
Years	Team	Gms	W	D	L	W%
2016–17	Fiji	8	5	0	3	63
2026–	Fiji	3	1	0	2	33
- Source: As of 20 November 2026

Michael Potter (born 24 September 1963) is an Australian professional rugby league football coach who is the head coach of Fiji at international level, and a former professional rugby league footballer. He was previously head coach of Super League clubs, the Catalans Dragons, St Helens, the Bradford Bulls and NRL club the Wests Tigers. As a player, he was a New South Wales State of Origin representative fullback, playing his club football for the Canterbury-Bankstown Bulldogs (with whom he won the 1984 and 1985 premierships), the St George Dragons (whom he captained, and won the 1991 Dally M Medal with) and the Western Reds. He currently works as an assistant coach for the Canterbury-Bankstown Bulldogs.

== Early life ==
Potter was born in Parramatta, New South Wales, Australia.

== Playing career ==
=== Canterbury-Bankstown Bulldogs ===
Canterbury signed Potter while he was still a student at St Gregory's College, Campbelltown. He made his first grade debut in the round 18 match of 1983 against Eastern Suburbs coming in for the injured Neil Baker. There were three referees used in this match when the appointed referee, Mick Stone was injured. He was replaced by the reserve grade referee, Lionel Green, who subsequently was replaced by the Third Grade referee Paul Miller. This was Potter's only game of first grade in 1983. In only his second year of first-grade, Potter became the first fullback to win the Dally M Player of the Year award.

He is a member of Canterburys' 1984 Premiership winning team in their 6–4 win over Parramatta. A second premiership followed when Canterbury defeated St. George, 7–6 in the 1985 Grand Final at the Sydney Cricket Ground. Potter broke his leg in 1986 and struggled to regain his form at Canterbury.

=== St. George Dragons ===
He signed with the St. George Dragons in 1989 and later became team captain. In 1991, Potter won his second Dally M Player of the Year award. He played fullback for the Dragons in the 8-28 Grand Final loss to the Brisbane Broncos in 1992.

Michael Potter's good form for the Dragons in the back half of the 1992 season saw him in contention for Australia's World Cup Final squad as incumbent Aussie fullback Andrew Ettingshausen was unavailable because of injury, as were Gary Belcher and Dale Shearer. However, the size of the loss to the Broncos may have cost him his chance with Balmain's Tim Brasher and Newcastle's Brad Godden selected for the fullback role instead.

The following season Potter was captain of St. George in their 6–14 loss to Brisbane in the 1993 Grand Final.

Potter retired at the end of the 1993 season.

=== Western Reds ===
Potter returned to playing rugby league, and signed to play for one of the four new teams introduced for the 1995 season, the Western Reds, going on to play 21 games for the Perth based team before retiring for good at the end of the 1996 ARL season.

== Coaching career ==
Following his retirement as a player in 1996, Potter started his coaching career as assistant coach for the Super League team, the Bradford Bulls, alongside Matthew Elliott. He remained there until 1999 when he took over the coaching position for the New South Wales Under-17 squad, coaching them to consecutive wins over Queensland.

Potter coached St. George Illawarra's Premier League side for four years before being appointed in February 2006 as head coach for the French rugby league team the Catalans Dragons, succeeding Steve Deakin. Potter coached the team to the 2007 Challenge Cup Final and in 2008 was named Super League coach of the year.

Potter succeeded Daniel Anderson as head coach of St Helens at the beginning of the 2009 season. He coached St Helens to the 2009 Super League Grand Final defeat by Leeds at Old Trafford. In May 2010, he announced that he would be leaving St. Helens at the end of the 2010 season. In July 2010 Potter signed a two-year contract to return to Bradford, this time as head coach, commencing in 2011. Despite the club being placed in receivership in 2012, the team was on the verge of making the semis as Potter remained as unpaid coach. "I think I served above and beyond what I needed to do there," Potter said. "I felt obliged to do that. It has made me a better coach. The reasons I want to coach aren't financial but because you love the game."

In October 2012, NRL side West Tigers confirmed that Potter would be the head coach for the 2013 and 2014 seasons. With papers reporting that he had been endorsed by the club's players, Potter said, "I am very happy to be here, there's not many jobs like this. I have served a long apprenticeship and I think I am ready."

After much speculation during the 2014 season, following reports of miscommunication between him and the playing group, as well as continued poor results on the field, it was announced on 17 September 2014 that Potter would not be extended as a coach. He had completed two seasons as their coach. He later said, "I found it to be a different club to any club I’d been with. It was a political hotbed. I knew the first day I went in there it was going to be a tough gig. I went in there to coach, not be a politician. It was conflicted."

Potter spent a large part of 2015 coaching the Fiji Under-20s side, and was an assistant coach with the New South Wales under-16s team. In November, it was confirmed that he would be joining the Newcastle Knights as an assistant coach under Nathan Brown.

In 2016, along with his role as assistant coach at the Newcastle club, Potter became the new coach of the Fiji national rugby league team on a deal to the end of the year that would see him coach Fiji in the 2016 Pacific Test against Papua New Guinea, with the Fiji National Rugby League and Potter, at the end of the year, to discuss extending that into the 2017 Rugby League World Cup. In 2018, Potter stood down from his role as coach of the Fijian national team.

On 2 November 2018, Potter was announced as an NRL Development Coach at the Parramatta Eels.

In 2020, he became head coach of NSW Cup side, Mounties.

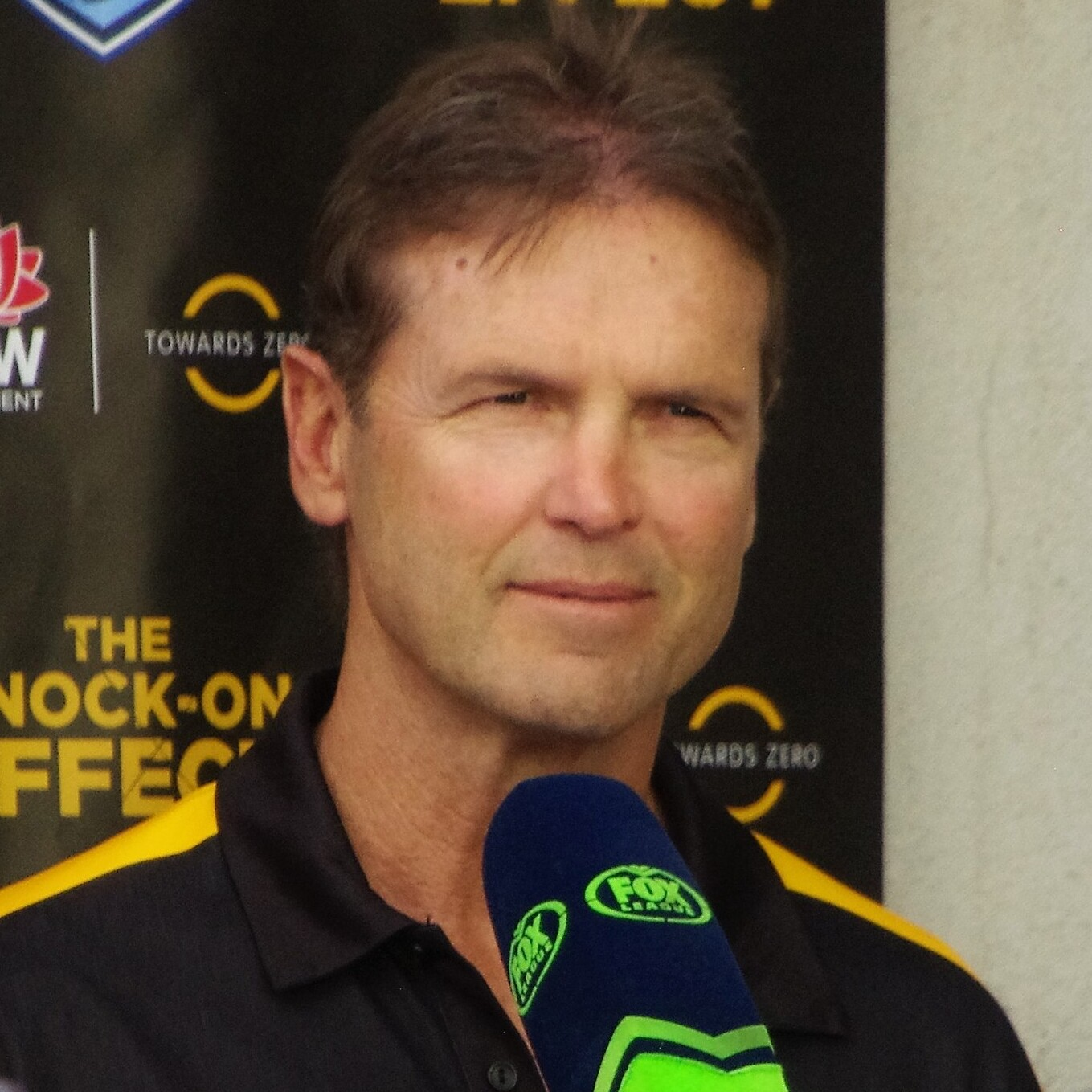
Potter in 2022

On 18 May 2022, Potter was made interim coach of the Canterbury-Bankstown Bulldogs after Trent Barrett stood down as head coach for the remainder of 2022.

On 20 June 2026 it was reported that he had taken up the role of head-coach for Fiji in readiness for the forthcoming 2026 Rugby League World Cup However, this was overturned and on 3 September 2026 it was reported that Wise Kativerata would continue as head coach and lead Fiji in the 2026 Rugby League World Cup

=== Fiji coaching record ===
Opponent	Played	Won	Drew	Lost	Win Ratio (%)
Australia	2	0	0	2	00.00
Cook Islands	1	1	0	0	100.00
Italy	1	1	0	0	100.00
New Zealand	1	1	0	0	100.00
Papua New Guinea	1	0	0	1	00.00
Samoa	1	1	0	0	100.00
Tonga	1	0	0	1	00.00
United States	1	1	0	0	100.00
Wales	1	1	0	0	100.00
TOTAL	10	6	0	4	60.00

World Cup record
Year	Round	Position	GP	W	L	D
Australia/New Zealand/Papua New Guinea 2017	Fourth-Place	4/14	5	4	1	0
Total	0 Titles	0/1	5	4	1	0

Pacific tests
Year	Round	Position	GP	W	L	D
2016 Melanesian Cup	Runners up	2/2	1	0	1	0
2017	Runners up	2/2	1	0	1	0
Total	0 Titles	0/2	2	0	2	0

Other Test matches
Year	Round	Position	GP	W	L	D
2016	Winners	1/2	1	1	0	0
Total	1 Win	1/1	1	1	0	0
