= Chad Robinson =

Australian rugby league footballer

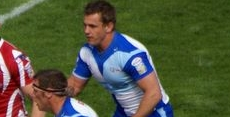

Personal information
- Full name: Chad Damian Robinson
- Born: 20 October 1980 Sydney, New South Wales, Australia
- Died: 26 November 2016 (aged 36) Kenthurst, New South Wales, Australia

Playing information
- Height: 185 cm (6 ft 1 in)
- Weight: 98 kg (15 st 6 lb)
- Position: Lock, Second-row
Club
Years	Team	Pld	T	G	FG	P
2000–01	Parramatta Eels	8	0	0	0	0
2002–04	Sydney Roosters	70	6	0	0	24
2005–08	Parramatta Eels	81	9	0	0	36
2009	Harlequins RL	15	2	0	0	8
	Total	174	17	0	0	68
Representative
Years	Team	Pld	T	G	FG	P
2008	City NSW	1	0	0	0	0
- Source: As of 18 October 2008
- Relatives: Tim Robinson (brother)

Chad Damian Robinson (20 October 1980 – 26 November 2016) was an Australian professional rugby league footballer. Robinson spent several years in Australia's National Rugby League with the Parramatta Eels and the Sydney Roosters and a season with Super League side Harlequins RL.

Robinson had been reported missing on 26 November 2016, but less than a month later on 22 December 2016, he was found dead in his car.

== Playing career ==
Having won the 2002 NRL Premiership, Robinson traveled to England to play the 2003 World Club Challenge against Super League champions, St Helens R.F.C. Robinson played from the interchange bench in Sydney's victory. He played from the interchange bench for the Roosters in the 2003 NRL grand final which they lost to the Penrith Panthers. Robinson played for the Sydney Roosters from the interchange bench in their 2004 NRL grand final loss to cross-city rivals, Canterbury-Bankstown.

In 2005, Robinson joined Parramatta and played 20 games as the club won the minor premiership. Parramatta went into the finals series as one of the favourites to take out the 2005 premiership but lost 29–0 to North Queensland in the preliminary final in a shock upset. Robinson subsequently played in Parramatta's finals campaigns in 2006 and in 2007 which saw the club reach the 2007 preliminary final against Melbourne. Robinson's last year at Parramatta saw the club fail to reach the finals and he departed the side at the end of 2008. In July 2008 he signed a two-year deal with the Super League side Harlequins starting in 2009.

== Personal life ==
Robinson was the older brother of former Cronulla-Sutherland Sharks player Tim Robinson.

Robinson was reported missing at about 7:30 PM on 26 November 2016. On 22 December 2016, Robinson was found dead inside a crashed car by electrical workers in a gorge in the outer Sydney suburb of Kenthurst. His death was later determined to be a suicide.

== See also ==
- List of solved missing person cases (2010s)
