= Tim Robinson (rugby league) =

Australian rugby league footballer (born 1988)

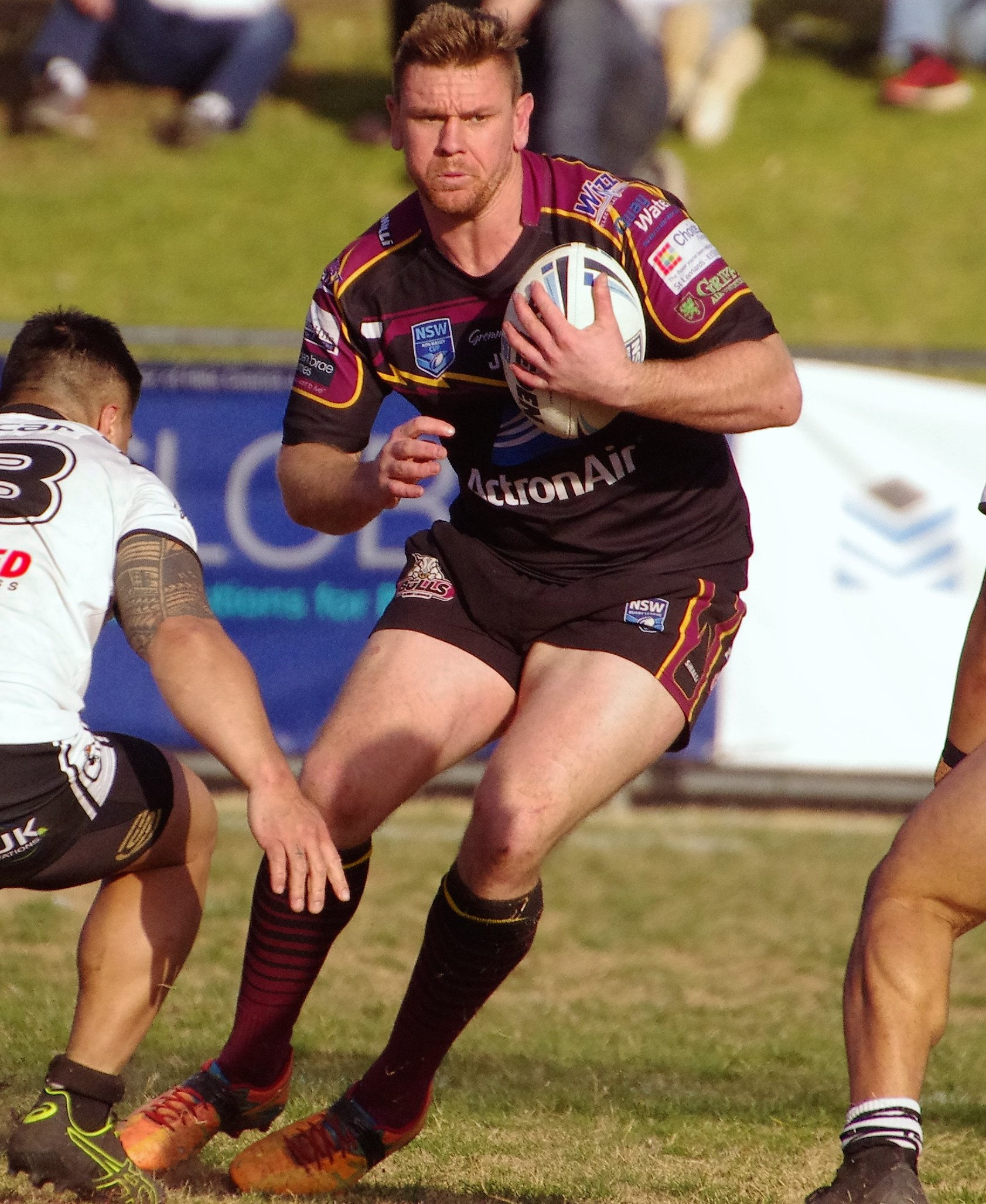

Personal information
- Born: 10 March 1988 (age 38) Baulkham Hills, New South Wales, Australia
- Height: 186 cm (6 ft 1 in)
- Weight: 104 kg (16 st 5 lb)

Playing information
- Position: Prop, Second-row
Club
Years	Team	Pld	T	G	FG	P
2011–12	Manly Sea Eagles	18	0	0	0	0
2014–15	Cronulla Sharks	9	1	0	0	4
	Total	27	1	0	0	4
- Source: As of 26 April 2020
- Relatives: Chad Robinson (brother)

Tim Robinson (born 10 March 1988) is an Australian professional rugby league footballer who has previously played for the Manly Warringah Sea Eagles and Cronulla-Sutherland Sharks in the National Rugby League. He primarily plays prop and second-row. Robinson currently plays for The Hills District Bulls in The Ron Massey Cup competition.

== Background ==
Born in Baulkham Hills, New South Wales, Robinson played his junior football for the Winston Hills Hawks before being signed by the Parramatta Eels.

== Playing career ==
In 2006, Robinson played for the Australian Schoolboys. In 2008, Robinson played for the Parramatta Eels' NYC team. In June 2008, Robinson re-signed with Parramatta. In 2009, Robinson moved on to Parramatta's New South Wales Cup feeder team, Wentworthville.

In November 2010, Robinson signed a contract with the Manly-Warringah Sea Eagles starting in 2011. In round 2 of the 2011 NRL season, Robinson made his NRL debut for Manly against the Sydney Roosters.

In 2013, Robinson joined the Cronulla-Sutherland Sharks. At the end of 2013, Robinson played in Cronulla's 2013 New South Wales Cup Grand Final win over the Windsor Wolves. In round 17 of the 2014 NRL season, Robinson made his debut for Cronulla against the Sydney Roosters.

On 21 September 2014, Robinson was named at prop in the 2014 New South Wales Cup Team of the Year.

On 28 August 2017, Robinson was named in the 2017 Ron Massey Cup team of the year.

== Personal life ==
Robinson is the younger brother of deceased former Parramatta Eels and Sydney Roosters player Chad Robinson.
