= Jeff Masterman =

Australia international rugby league footballer

Personal information
- Full name: Jeffrey Masterman
- Born: 25 April 1957 (age 69) Kurri Kurri, New South Wales, Australia

Playing information
- Position: Hooker
Club
Years	Team	Pld	T	G	FG	P
19??–??	Kurri Kurri	97
1981–85	Easts (Sydney)	70	9	0	0	31
	Total	167	9	0	0	31
Representative
Years	Team	Pld	T	G	FG	P
1981	New South Wales	2	0	0	0	0
1981	Australia	2	1	0	0	3

Jeff Masterman is an Australian former professional rugby league footballer who played in the 1970s and 1980s. He played for the Eastern Suburbs.

Originally from Kurri Kurri, New South Wales, Jeff Masterman made an immediate impact in his debut season at the Sydney Roosters in 1981, winning the Dally M Rookie of the year and the Dally M hooker of the year. He also gained selection for the New South Wales rugby league team and the Australia – playing two test matches against France in 1981. He is listed on the Australian Rugby League Players Register as Kangaroo No.532. He played four seasons with the Sydney Roosters between 1981-1983 and 1985, before injuries ended his career prematurely. In 2010 he was named in Kurri Rugby League Club's team of the century.
