= Liam Higgins (rugby league) =

Serbia international rugby league footballer

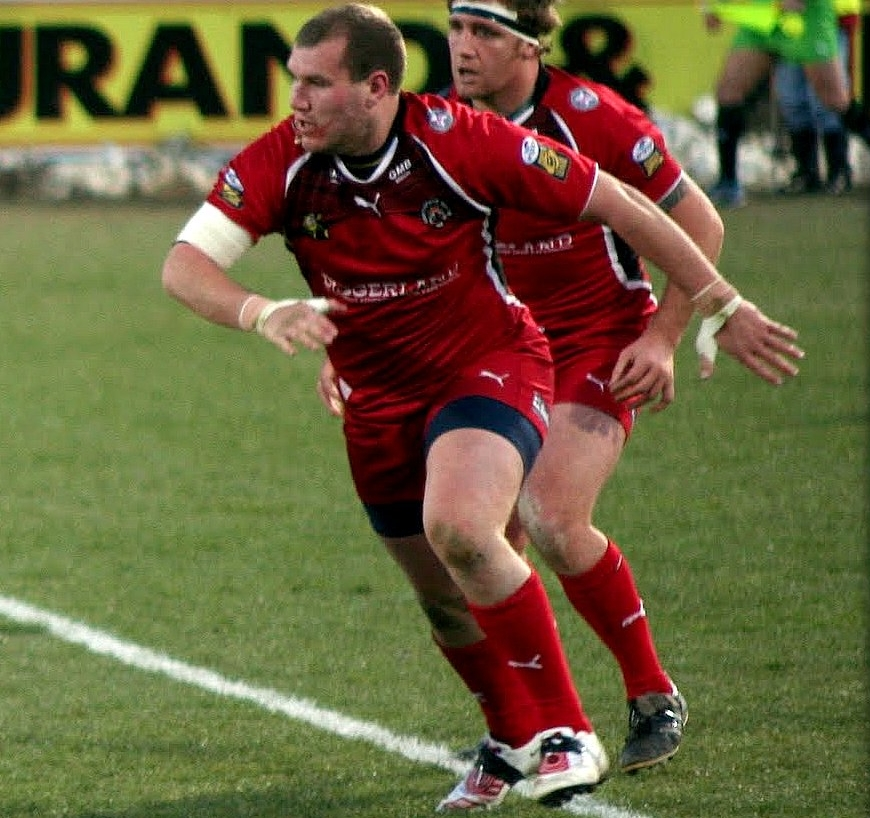

Personal information
- Born: 19 July 1983 (age 43) Doncaster, South Yorkshire, England

Playing information
- Height: 6 ft 1 in (1.85 m)
- Weight: 16 st 3 lb (103 kg)
- Position: Prop
Club
Years	Team	Pld	T	G	FG	P
2003–06	Hull FC	38	0	0	0	0
2007–10	Castleford Tigers	105	4	0	0	16
2011	Wakefield Trinity Wildcats	16	0	0	0	0
2012–13	Sheffield Eagles	56	2	0	0	8
	Total	215	6	0	0	24
Representative
Years	Team	Pld	T	G	FG	P
2013	Serbia	0	0	0	0	0

Liam Higgins (born 19 July 1983) is an English former professional rugby league footballer. He previously played for Hull FC, Castleford Tigers, Wakefield Trinity Wildcats and Sheffield Eagles. His usual position is Prop.

== International career ==
Higgins qualifies for Serbia through his Serbian Grandfather. He was called up to the Serbia squad for the first time to compete in the 2013 Rugby League World Cup qualifying tournament.
