= Jamie Lyon =

Australian rugby league footballer

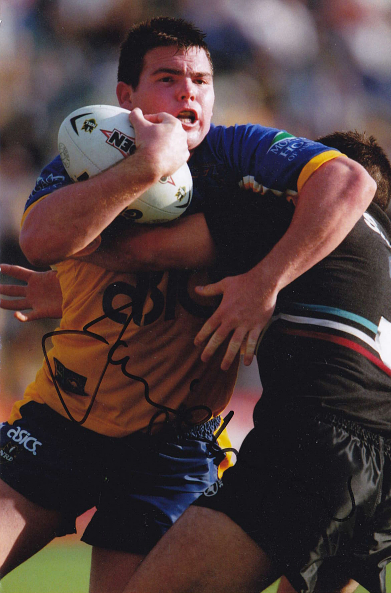

Personal information
- Born: 24 January 1982 (age 44) Narrabri, New South Wales, Australia

Playing information
- Height: 182 cm (6 ft 0 in)
- Weight: 93 kg (14 st 9 lb)
- Position: Centre, Five-eighth
Club
Years	Team	Pld	T	G	FG	P
2000–04	Parramatta Eels	70	36	0	0	144
2005–06	St Helens	63	46	206	0	586
2007–16	Manly Sea Eagles	224	86	533	0	1410
	Total	357	168	739	0	2140
Representative
Years	Team	Pld	T	G	FG	P
2003–09	Country Origin	2	1	3	0	10
2002–10	New South Wales	10	1	8	0	20
2001–10	Australia	8	4	2	0	20

Jamie Lyon (born 24 January 1982), also known by the nickname of "Killer", is an Australian former professional rugby league footballer who played in the 2000s and 2010s. An Australian international and New South Wales State of Origin representative goal-kicking centre, he played his first club football for the Parramatta Eels before joining Super League with English club St. Helens, with whom he won the 2006 Championship and Challenge Cup titles. Lyon then returned to the NRL with Manly Warringah, winning the 2008 and 2011 grand finals with them.

Originally used as a five-eighth by Manly, he switched back to his preferred centre position in 2009 and became regarded as one of the best centres in the game, winning the Dally M Centre of the Year in 2010, 2011, 2013 and 2014, the Rugby League International Federation Centre of the Year in 2011 and 2013, and the Dally M Captain of the Year in 2012 (along with Manly co-captain Jason King), and again individually in 2014.

In 2016, he became just the fourth player since 1908 (after Ryan Girdler (1991–2004), Hazem El Masri (1996–2009), and former Eels team mate Luke Burt (1999–2012)) to score 100 tries and kick 500 goals in a first grade career in Australia. As of 2025, his 1,410 points total for Manly (86 tries, 533 goals) make him the 2nd top point scorer in club history, behind Graham Eadie's career total of 1,917 points.

== Early life ==
Born in Narrabri in north-central New South Wales on 24 January 1982 and growing up in Wee Waa, New South Wales, Lyon played junior rugby league for the Wee Waa Panthers. Selected to play for the Australian Schoolboys team, while attending Parramatta Marist High School he was part of the 1999 squad who went undefeated in their tour of France, Ireland and England. Parramatta Eels' club development officer at the time, Noel Cleal, saw potential in the young centre and managed to lure Lyon to sign with the Sydney club.

== Professional playing career ==
=== Parramatta (2000 to 2004) ===
Lyon made his NRL début coming off the bench in the Eels' round 21 clash against the newly merged Wests Tigers on 25 June 2000 becoming the 622nd first grader for Parramatta in the process. He scored his first try just three rounds later and he finished his début season with a try in Parramatta's 32–24 victory over the St George Illawarra Dragons. In 2001, Lyon found himself regularly in the run-on squad. By season's end Parramatta took out the J. J. Giltinan Shield as the minor premiers thanks in part to Lyon's 11 tries. After defeating the New Zealand Warriors and the Brisbane Broncos in the qualifying and preliminary finals respectively, Parramatta fell just short of becoming premiers losing to the Newcastle Knights in 2001 NRL Grand Final, in which Lyon played at centre, scoring two tries. At the end of the 2001 NRL season, Lyon became the 697th player to represent Australia when he made his national representative début in the test match at Lloyd Robson Oval, Port Moresby against Papua New Guinea where he scored two tries off the bench. Later that year, he became the youngest-ever Kangaroo tourist when he was selected for the 2001 Kangaroo Tour. The start of the 2002 NRL season started off well for Lyon, and he made his New South Wales Blues début in Game I of the 2002 State of Origin series, scoring a try in 32–4 points victory. He played again in Game II of the series however an ankle injury that was sustained in the Eels round 14 match against the defending premiers, found Lyon out for the remainder of the season. In June 2002, he extended his contract with the Parramatta club until the end of 2006 at around $250,000 per season.

Lyon made his return in Round 1 of the 2003 NRL season. Starting off well again, he scored four tries in four games. That year, he played in all three games for the Blues in their 2–1 2003 State of Origin series victory. A hamstring injury though saw Lyon again on the sideline. However, he recovered and in round 24, he set the club record for the most tries in first grade match when he ran in 5 in Parramatta's 74–4 victory over the Cronulla-Sutherland Sharks, helping the Eels set their highest ever score and largest ever winning margin in process. But this was not enough for the Eels as they just missed the finals for the first time since 1996, and for the first time in Brian Smith's time at the club. During his time at Parramatta, Lyon had received several club awards including the Jack Gibson Award in 2001 awarded by the first grade coach, the Ron Lynch Media Award in 2003, the Members People Choice Award in 2003 and, along with Matthew Petersen, was jointly awarded the Murray Wilson Try Scoring Award as the top try scorers for the club in the 2003 NRL season.

Lyon made headlines when on 15 March 2004, after four seasons, 70 games and at the age of just 22, announced that he was retiring from Parramatta and the NRL. He did so just two days after Parramatta's round one 48–14 loss to the Canterbury-Bankstown Bulldogs and without talking to his teammates. He had around two years remaining on his contract. In reaction to the announcement, fellow country players Justin Hodges and David Peachey publicly supported his decision. With both players themselves taking breaks from the game, Hodges was quoted as saying that "footy does get a hold on you and it does get you down sometimes. People say it's the life but sometimes there's more bad than good. He's [Lyon] only 22 and he's from the country so it's pretty hard living in a big city like this. Even I struggled." Terry Hill added to the controversy when at the press conference to announce his own retirement, he predicted more young players would take Lyon's lead and leave the top grade. Lyon later said, "I definitely would’ve changed a few things with the Parramatta, the finish up there. It wasn’t the best way to go and, you know, I was still pretty young and I let my teammates and the club down out there and obviously I’d love to change that if I could, but I can’t and at that time I was just finishing up totally from footy, I wasn’t going to play anymore."

=== Return to Country NSW ===
On 9 April 2004, Lyon's manager Alan Gainey announced that Lyon was seeking a clearance to return to his junior club – the Wee Waa Panthers. On 14 April 2004, one month after he walked out, Lyon and Gainey meet with Parramatta officials for two hours to determine Lyon's future. The following day, it was announced this that his pay would be suspended and that the initial Wee Waa offer was rejected. However, six weeks later on 4 June 2004, the Eels conceded and granted the clearance under the condition that Lyon could not play for another club in the NRL. Lyon agreed to the condition and signed a supplemental agreement to play with the Country Rugby League Group Four club up until the end of 2006. He proved to be a worthy asset as the Panthers defeated the Moree Boars in the grand final. After bids from the Penrith Panthers, the Gold Coast Dolphins (as they originally were going to be named), the Canberra Raiders and the Sea-eagles, Lyon on 17 August 2004, signed with English Super League club St. Helens on a two-year deal. The club outlayed $150,000 to clear Lyon of his existing contract as well as $600,000 over the two seasons.

=== St Helens (2005 to 2006) ===
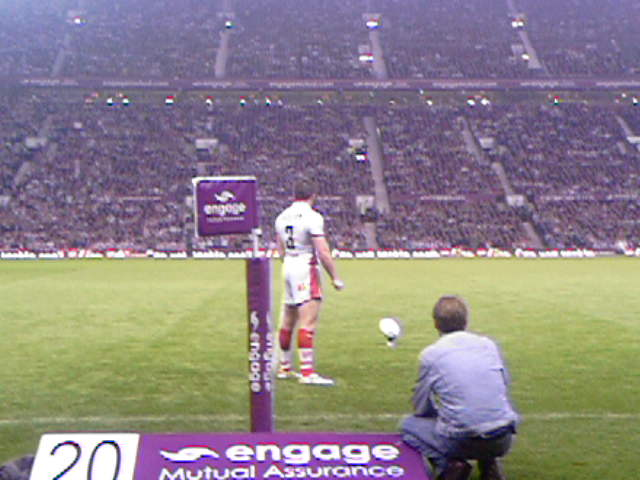
Lyon preparing to kick for goal

JamieLyonManly.jpg

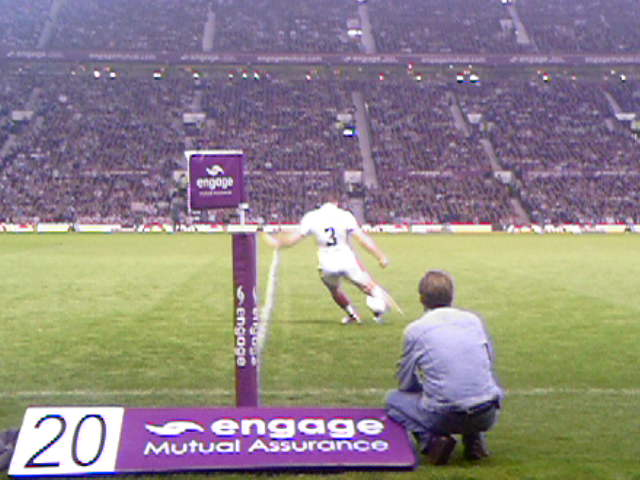
Jamie Lyon kicking at goal for St Helens in the 2006 Super League Grand Final victory over Hull F.C. at Old Trafford

Lyon made his début for the Saints on 11 February 2005 against the Widnes Vikings at Knowsley Road. After a delayed start due to crowd congestion, Lyon set up two tries in the 40–18 win. He scored his first try for the 116-year-old club in the round 5 clash against the Salford City Reds and in the following round against the Wakefield Trinity Wildcats kicked six goals from seven attempts. Lyon's performance for the Saints received praise from both the media and the fans. He was twice voted as the Super League Player of the Month by the readers of the British rugby league publication Rugby Leaguer and League Express. For rounds 13 to 16 he received 42 percent of the vote and for round 17 to 20 he increased his share to 67.5 percent of the vote. By the season's end, he had amassed 22 tries and 42 goals for a total 172 points; became only the fourth non-British player to be presented with the Man of Steel Award; was named the Rugby League Players Association Players' Player of the Year; and was named as part of the media selected 2005 Super League Dream Team.

In 2006, Lyon became the Saints' number one goal kicker with captain Paul Sculthorpe reduced to replacement kicker. He played for St Helens at centre, scoring a try and kicking 7 goals from 7 attempts, in their 2006 Challenge Cup Final victory against the Huddersfield Giants. In addition to the 88 points scored in the Challenge Cup, he almost doubled his 2005 premiership points tally with 328. As a result, he was once again selected as part of Super League Dream Team. St Helens reached the 2006 Super League Grand final to be contested against Hull F.C. and Lyon played at centre, kicking three goals in Saints' 26–4 victory.

=== Manly Warringah (2007 to 2016) ===
In March 2006, Lyon made contact with Parramatta with the intent of returning to his old club in 2007. In early May, it seemed certain that Lyon was about to sign with the Eels, but in June the deal went sour and other offers came in from Penrith and Newcastle. In the end Manly won out when on 5 July 2006, 5 days after the anti-tampering deadline it was announced that Lyon had signed a four-year deal with the Brookvale-based club. The determining factor was Noel Cleal, the club's recruitment officer.

On 2 October 2006, the squad for the 2006 Tri-Nations tournament was announced with Lyon being a surprise inclusion. In reaction to his selection, Parramatta legend Peter Sterling had at the time criticised Lyon, saying that he should not even be allowed in the NRL claiming that Lyon took $125,000 for playing only a handful of games in 2004 and considering Lyon as "lacking class". Lyon retorted that he did "not look up to Sterlo" and that the comments "would not worry" him. Lyon played in only one match during the series, Australia's first match against Great Britain where Australia went down 23–12. Australia ended up winning the series defeating New Zealand in the final.

After a great pre-season, he made his début for Manly on 17 March 2007 against the Canberra Raiders where he scored two tries and kicked three goals. Initially playing in the centres, the return of Steve Matai saw Lyon move into the five-eighth role. Round 9 saw Manly at home to Parramatta and the first time Lyon played against old club, however Parramatta played down the significance. Lyon got lucky as he scored early in second half to help steer Manly to victory.

Since Lyon's return to the NRL has played in the 2007 ANZAC Test against New Zealand and Games I and II of the 2007 State of Origin series.

He played in the Sea Eagles' 2007 NRL grand final defeat against the Melbourne Storm.

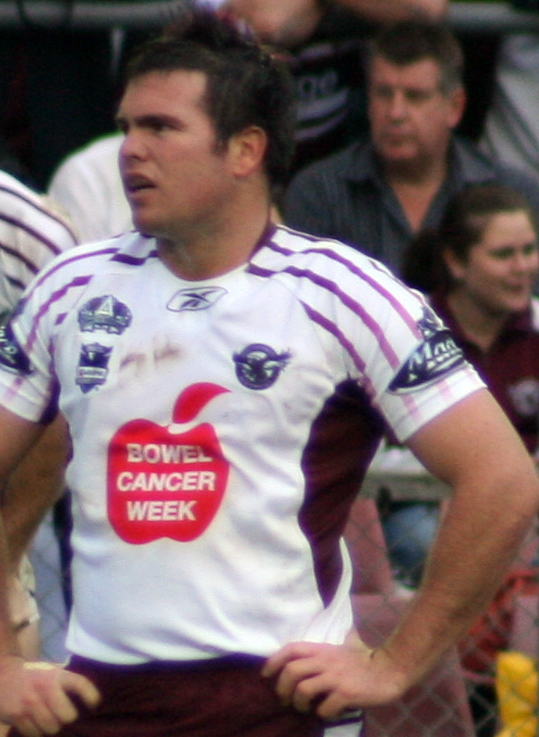
Lyon with the Manly-Warringah Sea Eagles in 2008

Lyon played in the 2008 NRL Grand Final victory over the Melbourne Storm, kicking two goals.

Lyon switched between centre and five-eight in the 2009 season, in the later games played in the centres to make way for young Kieran Foran.

After representative exile, he was selected for Country in the City vs Country match on 8 May 2009.

He was then named in the 17-man squad to represent New South Wales in the opening match of the 2009 State of Origin series, in Melbourne.

With the departure of captain Matt Orford to the Bradford Bulls in the Super League at the conclusion of the 2009 season, Lyon was named co-captain alongside Manly stalwart Jason King.

In the 2010 season, he was appointed co-captain of Manly. Since being appointed co-captaincy and making a permanent move to right centre position, Lyon had been in arguably career-best form, reflected by being named Dally M Centre of the Year in both 2010 and 2011. Lyon was also an almost automatic selection for both NSW and Australia, however he had sought exemption from representative duties on most occasions, citing family reasons.

Lyon started the 2010 Season playing at Five-Eighth and combining in the halves with Kieran Foran (at Halfback) for the Round 1 clash against the West Tigers at the Sydney Football Stadium. However following Manly's loss to the Tigers in Round 1, for the round 2 away-game against the Parramatta Eels, when Kieran Foran shifted back to Five-Eighth (from Halfback, to allow Trent Hodkinson to make his NRL debut); Lyon shifted back to the Centres (from Five-Eighth).

Lyon also played in the 2010 ANZAC test vs New Zealand, scoring two goals and for Game 1 of the 2010 State of Origin series.

Lyon captained the Manly Sea Eagles from his position at centre in the 2011 NRL grand final, scoring a try in the win over the New Zealand Warriors. On 3 November 2011 The annual RLIF Awards dinner was held at the Tower of London and Lyon was named centre of the year.

Lyon captained the Sea Eagles, kicking two goals in their 2012 World Club Challenge loss to the Leeds Rhinos in Leeds before the start of the 2012 NRL season.

In 2013, Lyon played and captained in every game for Manly (each week) of the regular season and including the finals appearances. Days before the NRL Grand Final, Lyon was named 'Dally M Centre of the year' at the NRL Dally M Awards event. He captained Manly in the grand final against the Sydney Roosters. However the Sydney Roosters won the game 26-18 and the premiership.

In 2014, Lyon once again won Dally M Centre of the Year at the NRL Dally M Awards Event. Although with this he also won the Dally M Captain of the Year" at the same event. With 1,410 points, Jamie Lyon is one of only four players along with Graham Eadie (1,917), Bob Batty (1,154) and Matthew Ridge (1,093) who have scored over 1,000 career points playing for Manly-Warringah.

On 27 April 2016, Lyon announced his retirement from rugby league at the season's end.

After his retirement from top level rugby league, Lyon Captain-Coached the Ballina Seagulls to a premiership in the Northern Rivers Regional Rugby League competition in 2019.
