= Geoff Toovey =

Australian RL coach and former Australia international rugby league footballer

Geoffrey Toovey
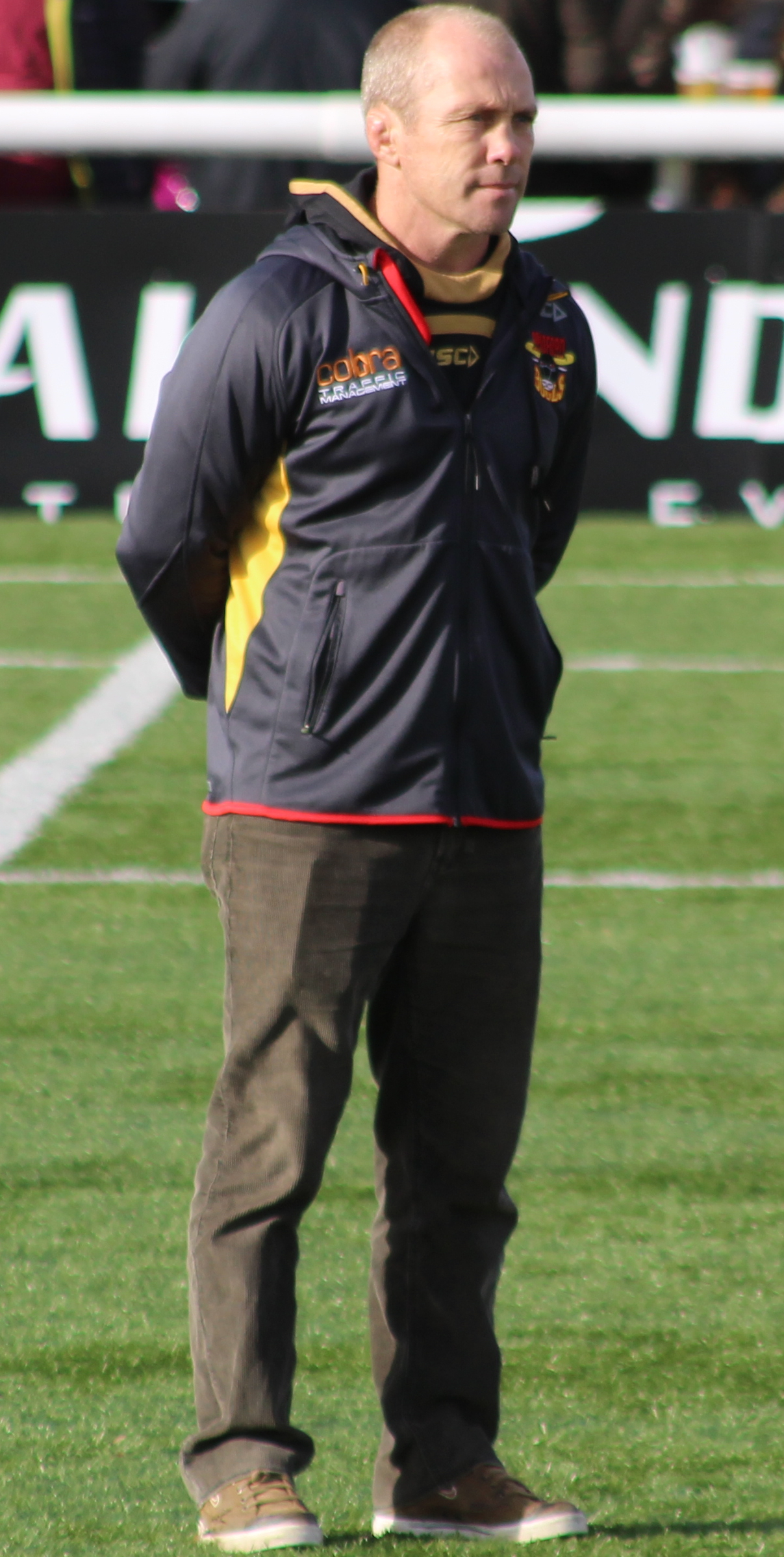

Personal information
- Born: 17 June 1969 (age 56) Sydney, New South Wales, Australia
- Height: 168 cm (5 ft 6 in)
- Weight: 70 kg (11 st 0 lb)

Playing information
- Position: Halfback, Hooker Five-eighth
Club
Years	Team	Pld	T	G	FG	P
1988–99	Manly Sea Eagles	238	35	0	0	140
2000–01	Northern Eagles	48	0	0	5	5
	Total	286	35	0	5	145
Representative
Years	Team	Pld	T	G	FG	P
1990–97	NSW City	4	0	0	0	0
1990–00	New South Wales	16	0	0	0	0
1991–98	Australia	13	0	0	0	0

Coaching information
Club
Years	Team	Gms	W	D	L	W%
2012–15	Manly Sea Eagles	105	61	1	43	58
2017	Bradford Bulls	23	8	0	15	35
	Total	128	69	1	58	54
- Source: As of 13 August 2017

Geoffrey Toovey (born 17 June 1969), also known by the nickname of "Toovs" or "Tooves", is the former head coach of the Bradford Bulls and former professional rugby league footballer. Toovey played halfback and Five-Eighth for the Manly-Warringah Sea Eagles, then played as a hooker later in his career at the Northern Eagles. He played 286 first-grade matches in all, and captained Manly to the 1996 ARL premiership and the 1995 and 1997 grand finals. He played in 13 international matches for Australia between 1991 and 1998. Toovey is the former head coach of Manly-Warringah.

== Early life ==
Toovey was educated at Davidson High School and played his junior rugby league for the Belrose Eagles, who participate in the Manly-Warringah/North Sydney District Rugby League district competition.

== Representative and playing career ==
Toovey made his first grade debut for Manly-Warringah in round 10 1988 against Cronulla-Sutherland at Brookvale Oval. Toovey played for Manly in subsequent finals campaigns in 1990, 1991 and 1994.

Toovey debuted for the New South Wales Blues in 1990, and was selected for the Australian team's end-of-season tour of Papua New Guinea in 1991 where he made his test debut for the Kangaroos, playing in all four games on tour including both tests against the Papua New Guinea Kumuls.

During the 1995 season at the commencement of the Super League war, Toovey again played State of Origin for NSW, though the team suffered a 3–0 loss to Queensland who were coached by his former Manly teammate Paul Vautin. With the non-selection of Super League players, Toovey was recalled to the Australian team for the first time since 1991 in the 3-0 Trans-Tasman series win over New Zealand in 1995. At the end of the season in which Manly finished as minor premiers but beaten Grand Finalists, he was selected in the Australian squad for the 1995 Rugby League World Cup, playing in the Kangaroos 16–8 win over host nation England in the World Cup Final at Wembley Stadium. Although selected at halfback for the game, coach Bob Fulton only played Toovey in the position during scrums and utilised his speed off the mark by playing him at dummy half in general play with Andrew Johns (named at hooker) assuming the halfback role.

In the 1996 State of Origin series, Toovey and Johns continued with the now commonplace positional and role interchange they had used successfully in the World Cup. Toovey captained Manly to the 1996 premiership after they defeated St. George in the grand final. Toovey also won the Clive Churchill Medal after being man of the match.

In 1997, Toovey captained New South Wales to a State of Origin series victory and played a Test match against a Rest of the World side. Manly would again finish as minor premiers for a third straight season in 1997. Toovey played in the club's grand final defeat against the Newcastle Knights.

Toovey played with Manly-Warringah up until the end of the 1999 NRL season and played in what was at the time to be the club's last game as a stand-alone entity which came against St George in round 26 1999. At the conclusion of the season, Manly controversially merged with arch rivals North Sydney to form the Northern Eagles as part of the NRL's rationalisation policy.

Toovey was the club's inaugural captain for the 2000 NRL season. In 2000 he played at hooker in NSW's clean sweep against Queensland. Toovey's final season as a player came during the 2001 NRL season. His last game came in round 26 2001 against the Brisbane Broncos in which the Northern Eagles were defeated 42–14.

=== Captaincy ===
At the height of the Super League war, Toovey was honoured as Australian Test captain for the 1996 one-off Test against the Papua New Guinea Palais (the ARL loyalist side).

== Post playing ==
Toovey retired at the end of 2001. He became an accountant by profession and a member of the board of the NRMA.

=== Coaching career ===
Toovey joined the Manly coaching staff when Des Hasler took over as coach in 2004 and in 2011 was appointed as Manly's head coach from the 2012 season, after Hasler first announced he would be moving to the Canterbury-Bankstown Bulldogs for the 2012 season.

Toovey's first competitive match in charge of the Sea Eagles was their defeat in the 2012 World Club Challenge.

In the 2012 Manly-Warringah Sea Eagles season, Toovey's first as an NRL head coach, the club came to within one game of the grand final but lost to Melbourne.

In the 2013 NRL season, Toovey guided Manly into the Grand Final against the Sydney Roosters. The Roosters ran out 26–18 winners. During the year, Toovey was fined $10,000 by the National Rugby League following his press-conference after Manly had lost their Round 23 game to South Sydney. Toovey had been unhappy with a number of refereeing decisions during the game, won 22–10 by the Rabbitohs, and had famously called for an investigation. In 2015, Manly sacked Toovey following a disappointing season and was replaced by Trent Barrett.

In January 2017, it was announced that Toovey would become the head coach of RFL Championship side Bradford Bulls, taking over from Rohan Smith following the liquidation and re-establishment of the club.

In 2022, Toovey was an assistant coach for the Samoa national rugby league team in the 2021 Rugby League World Cup.

Sporting positions
Preceded by Paul Harragon	(Australia); Australian national rugby league captain 1996	Succeeded by Alan Langer
