= Jason King (rugby league) =

Australian rugby league footballer and administrator

Personal information
- Born: 21 March 1981 (age 45) Manly, New South Wales, Australia

Playing information
- Height: 192 cm (6 ft 4 in)
- Weight: 111 kg (17 st 7 lb)
- Position: Prop
Club
Years	Team	Pld	T	G	FG	P
2001–02	Northern Eagles	22	2	0	0	8
2003–14	Manly Sea Eagles	217	9	0	0	36
	Total	239	11	0	0	44
Representative
Years	Team	Pld	T	G	FG	P
2005–07	NSW City	3	0	0	0	0
2010–11	New South Wales	2	0	0	0	0

Jason King (born 21 March 1981) is an Australian sports administrator who currently works for the NRL. King is a former professional rugby league footballer who played in the 2000s and 2010s. A New South Wales State of Origin representative front row forward, King played his club football in Sydney for the Northern Eagles and Manly-Warringah Sea Eagles, with whom he won the 2008 NRL Premiership. He also represented City Origin.

== Playing career ==
=== 2000s ===
King made his National Rugby League debut from the bench for the Northern Eagles in a 42–14 loss to the Brisbane Broncos at the NorthPower Stadium in Gosford on 1 September in Round 26 of the 2001 NRL season. In 2002, King became a permanent figure in the Northern Eagles team, playing 22 games for the season and scoring two tries. He scored his first try in the top grade in a 36–12 win over the Canberra Raiders in Round 6 in Gosford.

From the 2003 NRL season, the Northern Eagles were no more and the Manly-Warringah club was back in the premiership (the Northern Eagles had been the result of an uneasy merger between Manly and their local rivals the North Sydney Bears). By this time King had cemented his place in the side and would remain with Manly for the remainder of his career.

King's form in 2005 saw him gain his first selection for City Origin. He was selected on the bench as City defeated Country Origin 29–22 at the Oakes Oval in Lismore. King would also play for City Origin in 2006 and 2007.

Manly were one of the form teams of the 2007 NRL season and qualified for their first Grand Final since 1997. King's first Grand Final experience was soured as the Manly club were defeated 34-8 by the Melbourne Storm.

Manly, with Jason King forming a strong front row rotation with test forward Brent Kite and former Newcastle Knights prop Josh Perry, maintained their form in the 2008 NRL season and the Grand Final would again see the Sea Eagles come up against Melbourne. This time however Manly-Warringah were in superlative form after easily accounting for St. George Illawarra and New Zealand Warriors in the Qualifying and Preliminary Finals. The 2008 NRL Grand Final would see Manly win by a record margin of 40–0 over Melbourne. Despite playing on the bench in the Grand Final win over Melbourne, King was later voted Rugby League Players Association clubman of the year

King then went on to play in the front row in Manly's 28–20 win in the 2009 World Club Challenge over Super League champions the Leeds Rhinos at the Elland Road stadium in Leeds, England.

=== 2010s ===
In the 2010 season, King was appointed co-captain of Manly alongside Jamie Lyon. King's form improved during 2010 to the point where he was the 18th man for the New South Wales Origin team for Game 2 of the 2010 State of Origin series, and made his Origin debut in the front row in Game 3 of the series at the Telstra Stadium in Sydney. His form continued for the season despite the patchy form of the Sea Eagles. Unfortunately for King injury ruled him out of the Australian Kangaroos train on squad for the 2010 Four Nations tournament.

On 15 May 2011, King was named in the New South Wales Origin team for game 1 of the 2011 series at Suncorp Stadium in Brisbane where Queensland defeated the Blues 16–12. This would be the final State of Origin game of King's career.

Despite a strong start to the 2011 NRL season, a late season injury forced King to watch from the sidelines as Manly defeated the New Zealand Warriors 24–10 in the 2011 NRL grand final.

King returned to the team in 2012 as Manly made their way to the Preliminary Final. An injury interrupted 2013 season saw him play only four games and miss Manly's 26-18 2013 NRL Grand Final loss to the Sydney Roosters.

King was still co-captain of Manly-Warringah in the 2014 NRL season, though he played mostly from the bench. King retired at the end of the year after 22 games for the Northern Eagles and 217 games for Manly.

== Post playing ==
In 2017, King was appointed the NRL's General Manager of Elite Competitions. In 2020, King was appointed to an independent referee's panel. On 5 November 2025, Manly announced the appointment of King as the club CEO.

== Statistics ==
Year	Team	Games	Tries	Pts
2001	Northern Eagles	1		
2002	Northern Eagles	21	2	8
2003	Manly Warringah Sea Eagles	22	1	4
2004	Manly Warringah Sea Eagles	10	1	4
2005	Manly Warringah Sea Eagles	18		
2006	Manly Warringah Sea Eagles	22		
2007	Manly Warringah Sea Eagles	21	2	8
2008	Manly Warringah Sea Eagles	15		
2009	Manly Warringah Sea Eagles	23	2	8
2010	Manly Warringah Sea Eagles	24	1	4
2011	Manly Warringah Sea Eagles	16		
2012	Manly Warringah Sea Eagles	22	2	8
2013	Manly Warringah Sea Eagles	4		
2014	Manly Warringah Sea Eagles	20		
	Totals	239	11	44
