= 1993 NSWRL season =

Rugby league competition

1993 New South Wales Rugby League
- Teams: 16
- Premiers: Brisbane (2nd title)
- Minor premiers: Canterbury (5th title)
- Matches played: 182
- Points scored: 6,173
- Average attendance: 14,426
- Total attendance: 2,625,467
- Top points scorer: Daryl Halligan (180)
- Wooden spoon: Gold Coast; Seagulls (3rd spoon)
- Rothmans Medal: Ricky Stuart
- Top try-scorer: Noa Nadruku (22)

The 1993 NSWRL season (known as the 1993 Winfield Cup Premiership for sponsorship reasons) was the eighty-sixth season of professional rugby league football in Australia. The New South Wales Rugby League's sixteen teams competed for the J. J. Giltinan Shield during the season, which culminated in a replay of the previous year's grand final for the Winfield Cup trophy between the Brisbane Broncos and St. George Dragons. As Sydney celebrated winning the 2000 Olympic Games, Brisbane spoiled the party by retaining the NSWRL premiership.

== Season summary ==
This season the 10-metre rule was introduced, which required the defensive team to retreat 10 metres from where the ball is being played, allowing more room for attacking players.

In February, the Eastern Suburbs Roosters won the Rugby League World Sevens tournament, while in March the Canberra Raiders won the Challenge Cup final 20–18 against the Western Suburbs Magpies in Dubbo.

Reigning premiers Brisbane Broncos moved from their original home ground Lang Park to QE II Stadium south of the city. The move brought increased attendance figures, with the club attracting 51,517 fans to their first match at the venue in round 3 against the Parramatta Eels. The league broke an 85-year-old attendance record when 129,018 fans attended matches during round 4.

1992 runners-up St. George won their first six matches of the season to be the last undefeated team. Their streak broken by the Broncos at Kogarah Oval in round 7 with the visitors taking a tight 20–14 victory. By the middle of the season St. George and the Canterbury-Bankstown Bulldogs would vie for the top rungs on the ladder, with the Bulldogs taking the minor premiership with a better points differential after both teams finished with 17 wins each for the season.

In June the competition returned to play matches at the Sydney Cricket Ground for the first time since the 1987 season. Three matches were played at the venue, with the final match between St. George and Canterbury attracting an attendance of 35,641.

On 16 June the Gold Coast Seagulls were fined $50,000 for exceeding their 1992 salary cap by $150,000.

On 22 August the Canberra Raiders defeated the Parramatta Eels 68–0. This was the record for biggest winning margin where the losing team was kept scoreless for 31 years, until the North Queensland Cowboys defeated the Wests Tigers 74–0 in 2023.

In August, Parramatta announced that Ron Hilditch would replace coach Mick Cronin at the end of the season, while Bob McCarthy would replace Frank Curry who stood down as Souths coach.

Following the 22 regular season rounds played from March through August, Canterbury won the minor premiership, followed by St. George, Canberra, Manly and Brisbane who would go on to battle it out in the finals series.

=== Awards ===
- Rothmans Medal — Ricky Stuart (Canberra Raiders)
- Dally M Medal — Ricky Stuart (Canberra Raiders)
- Rugby League Week Player of the Year — Steve Walters

=== Representative matches ===
In April, City defeated Country 7–0 in the annual City vs Country Origin match.

In the annual State of Origin series between NSW and Queensland, NSW won the series 2–1.

Following the Origin series, an Australian team played three test matches against New Zealand. Australia won the series 2–0 after the first test in Auckland was drawn 14-all.

=== Teams ===
The lineup of teams remained unchanged from the previous season, with 16 clubs contesting the premiership, including five Sydney-based foundation teams, another six from Sydney, two from greater New South Wales, two from Queensland, and one from the Australian Capital Territory.

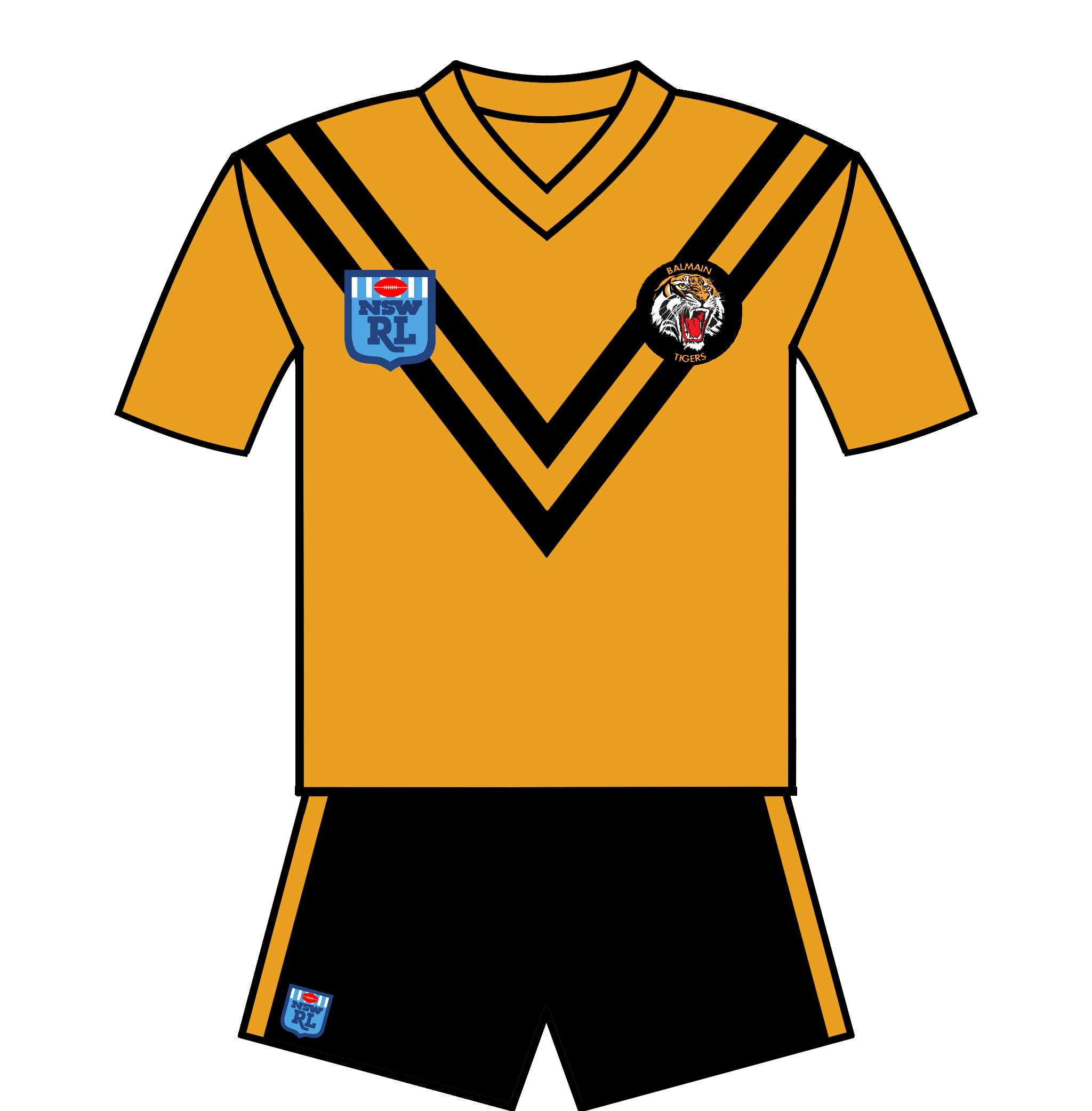
Balmain; Tigers 86th season Ground: Leichhardt Oval; Coach: Alan Jones; Captain: Ben Elias

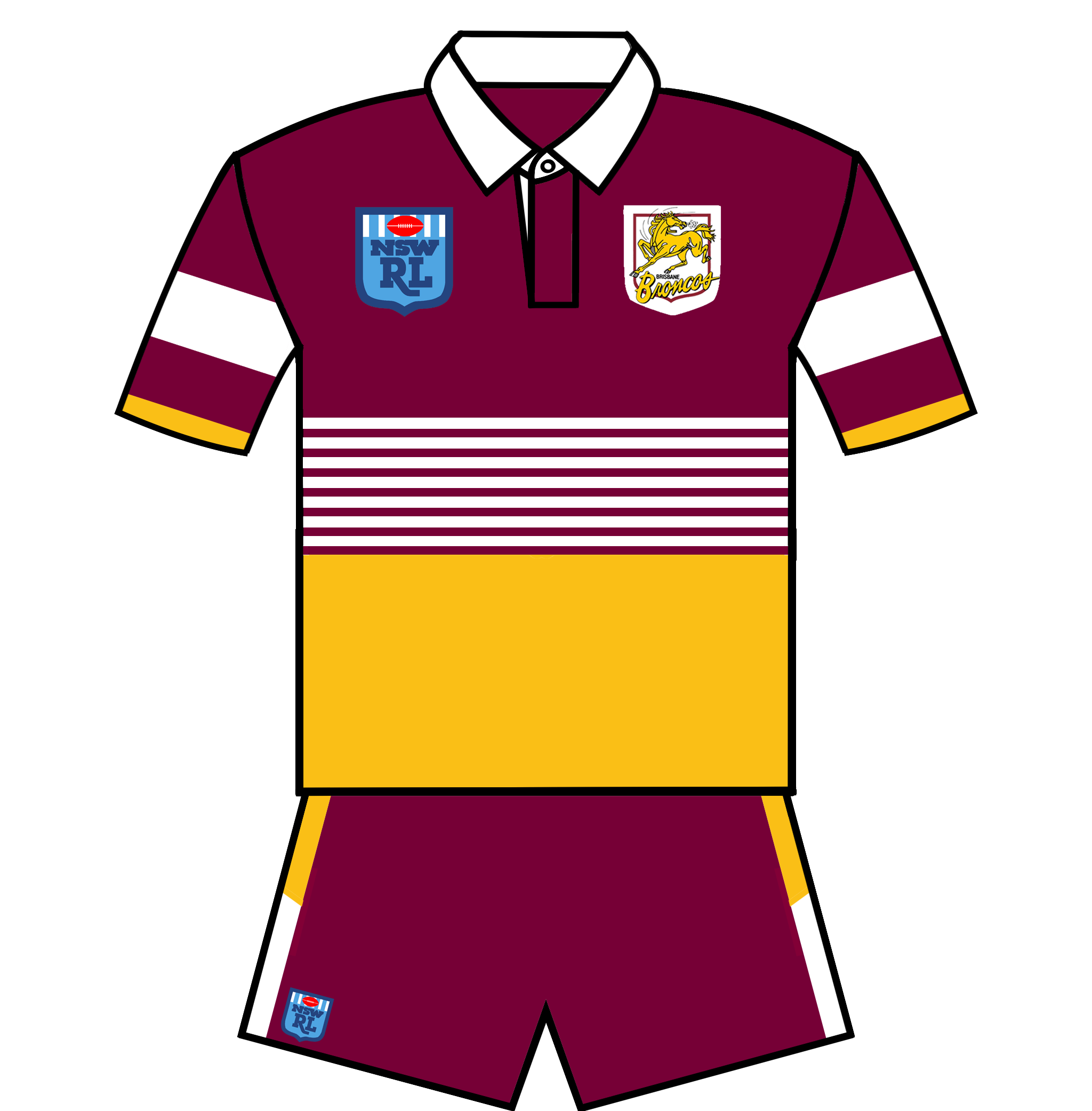
Brisbane; Broncos 6th season Ground: ANZ Stadium; Coach: Wayne Bennett; Captain: Allan Langer

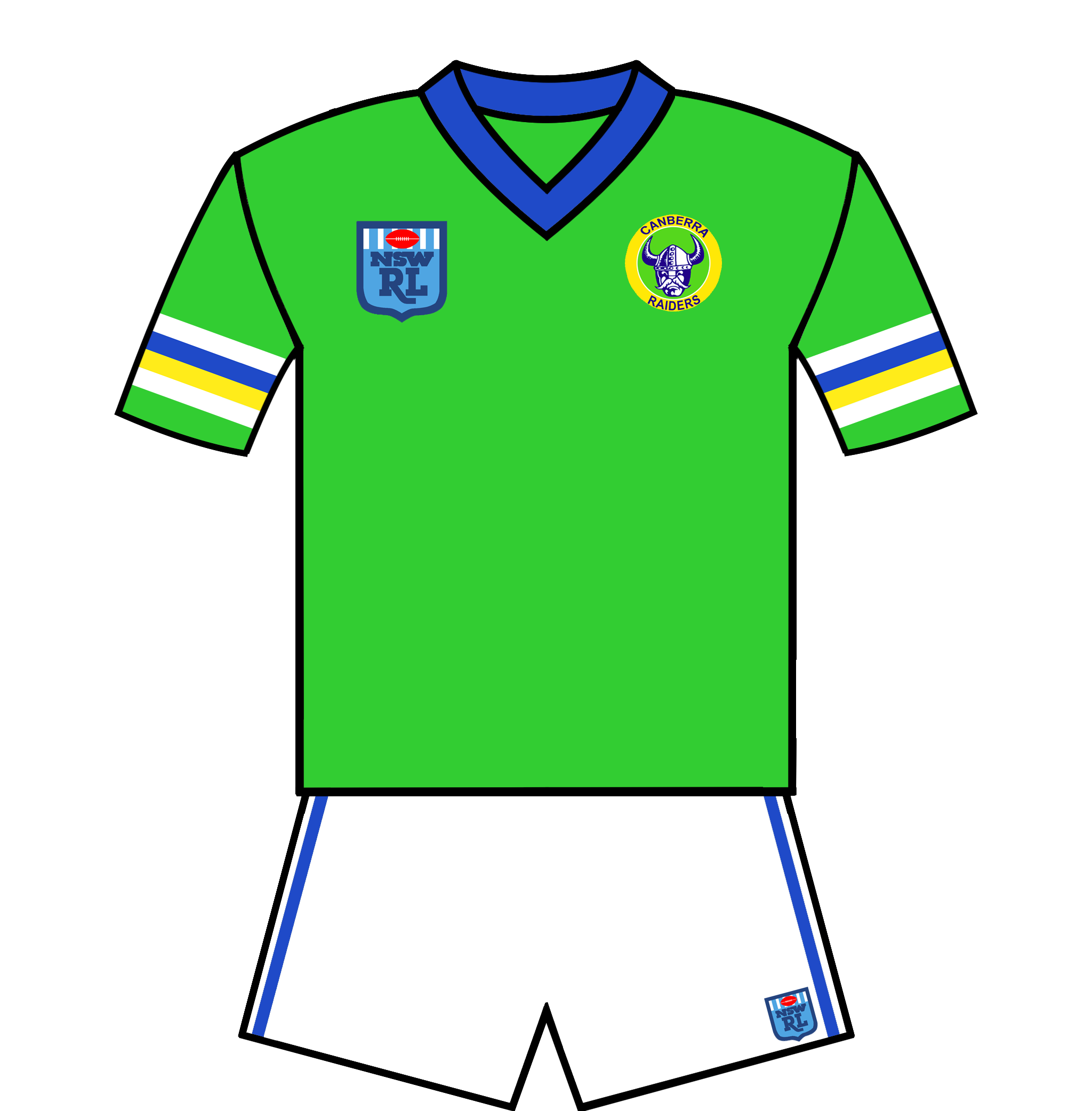
Canberra; Raiders 12th season Ground: Bruce Stadium; Coach: Tim Sheens; Captain: Mal Meninga

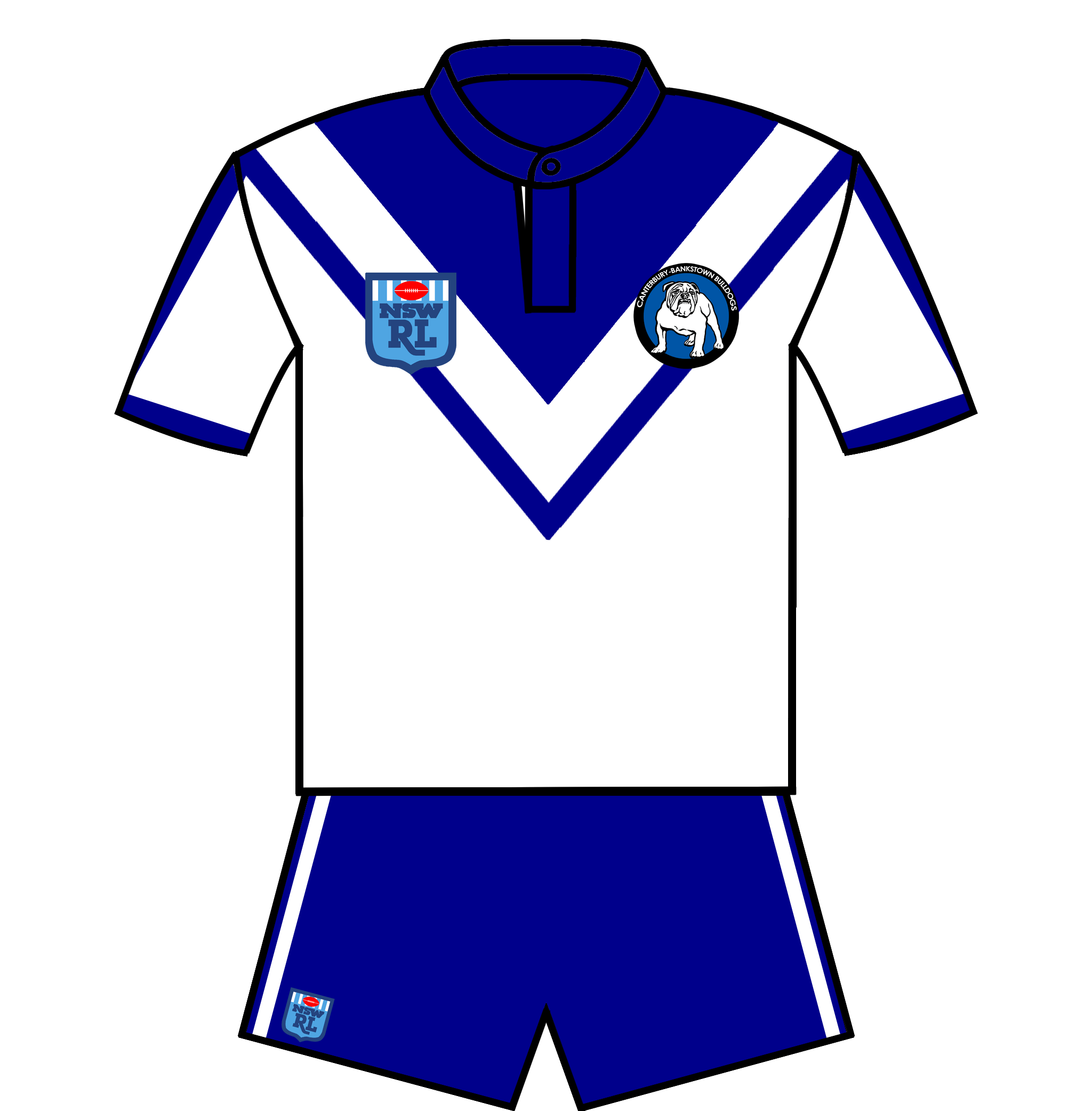
Canterbury-Bankstown; Bulldogs 59th season Ground: Belmore Oval; Coach: Chris Anderson; Captain: Terry Lamb

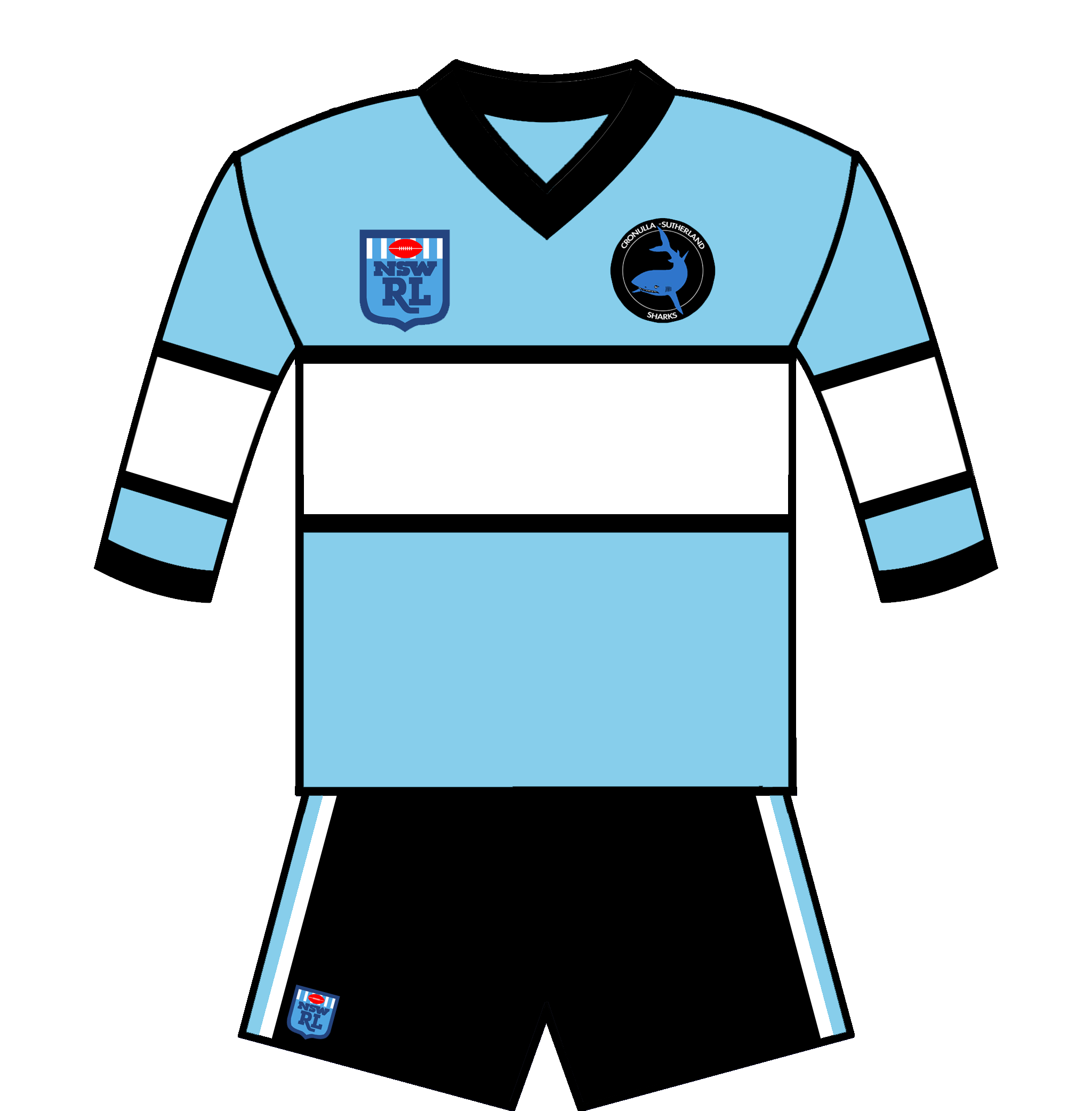
Cronulla-Sutherland; Sharks 27th season Ground: Endeavour Park; Coach: Arthur Beetson; Captain: Dan Stains

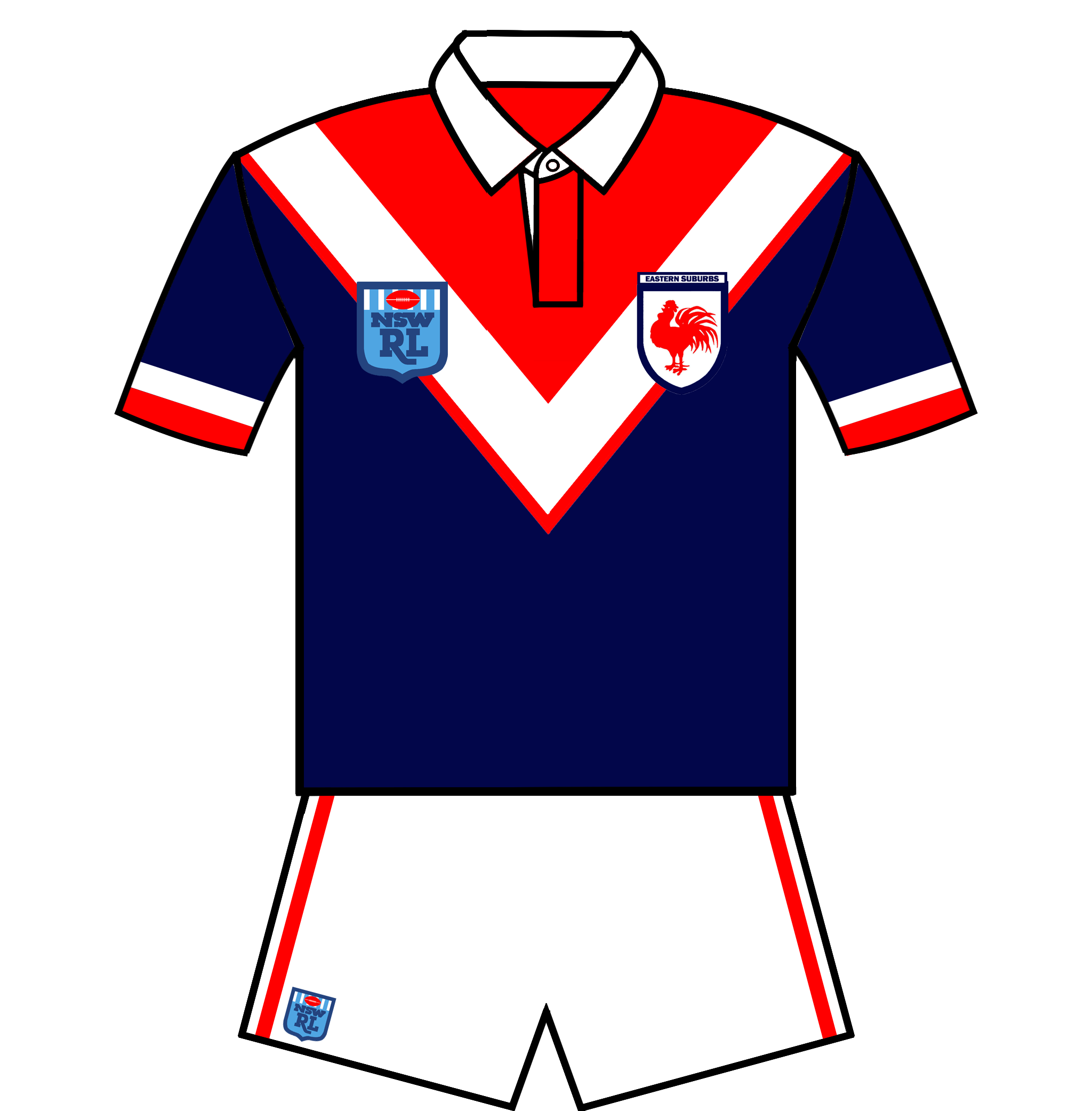
Eastern Suburbs; Roosters 86th season Ground: Sydney Football Stadium; Coach: Mark Murray; Captain: Craig Salvatori

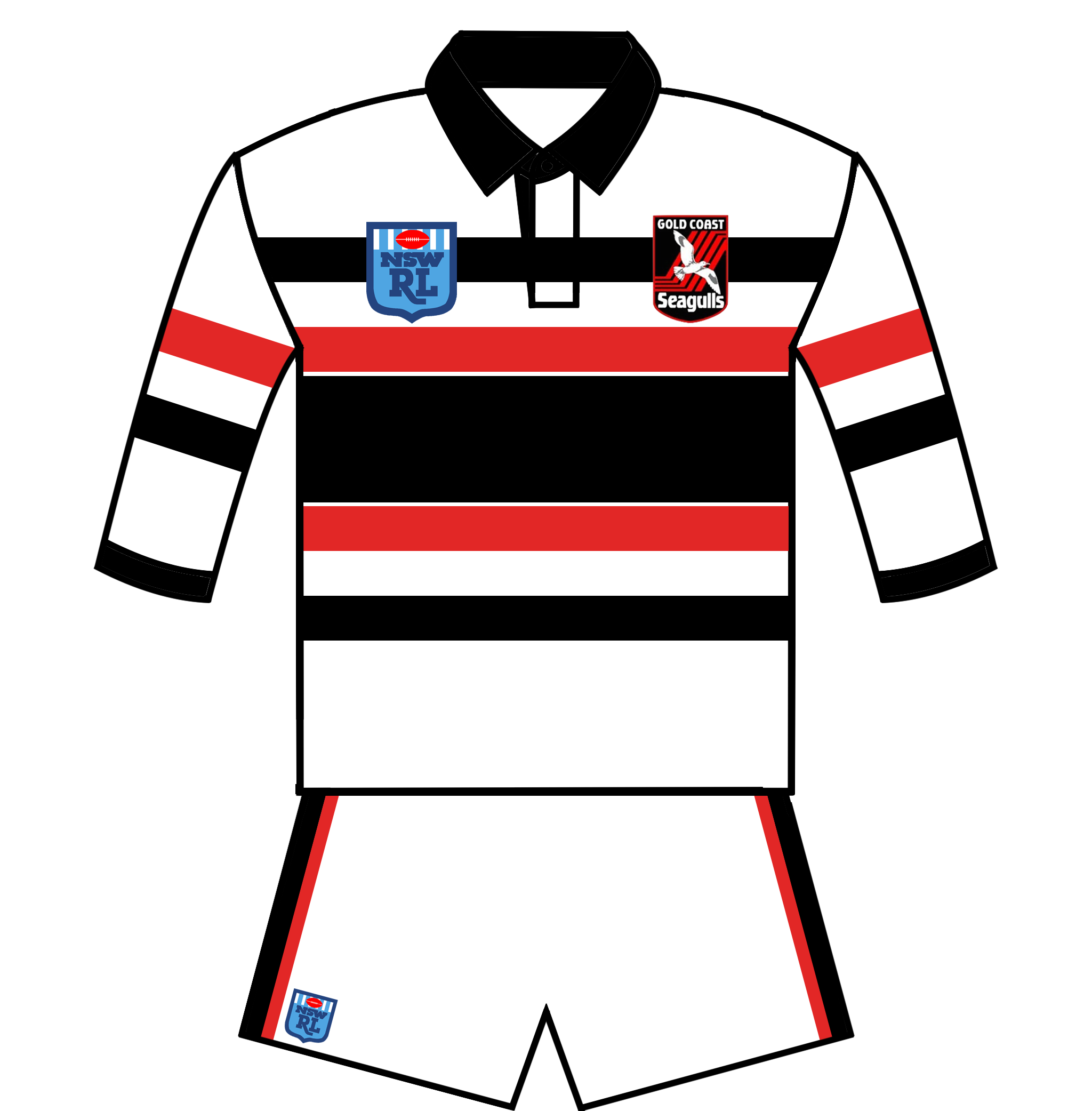
Gold Coast; Seagulls 6th season Ground: Seagulls Stadium; Coach: Wally Lewis; Captain: Peter Gill & Brent Todd

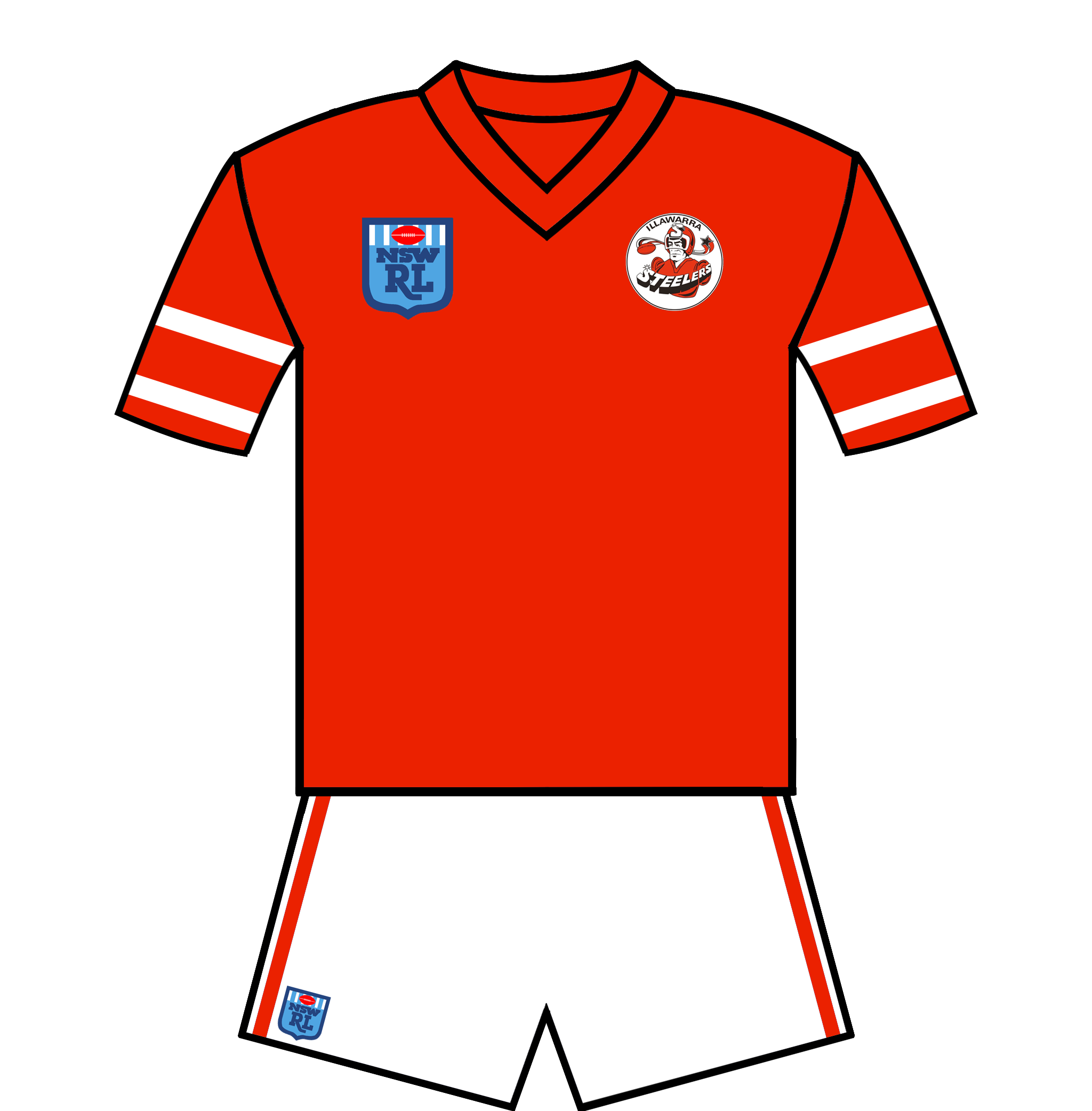
Illawarra; Steelers 12th season Ground: Wollongong Stadium; Coach: Graham Murray; Captain: John Cross

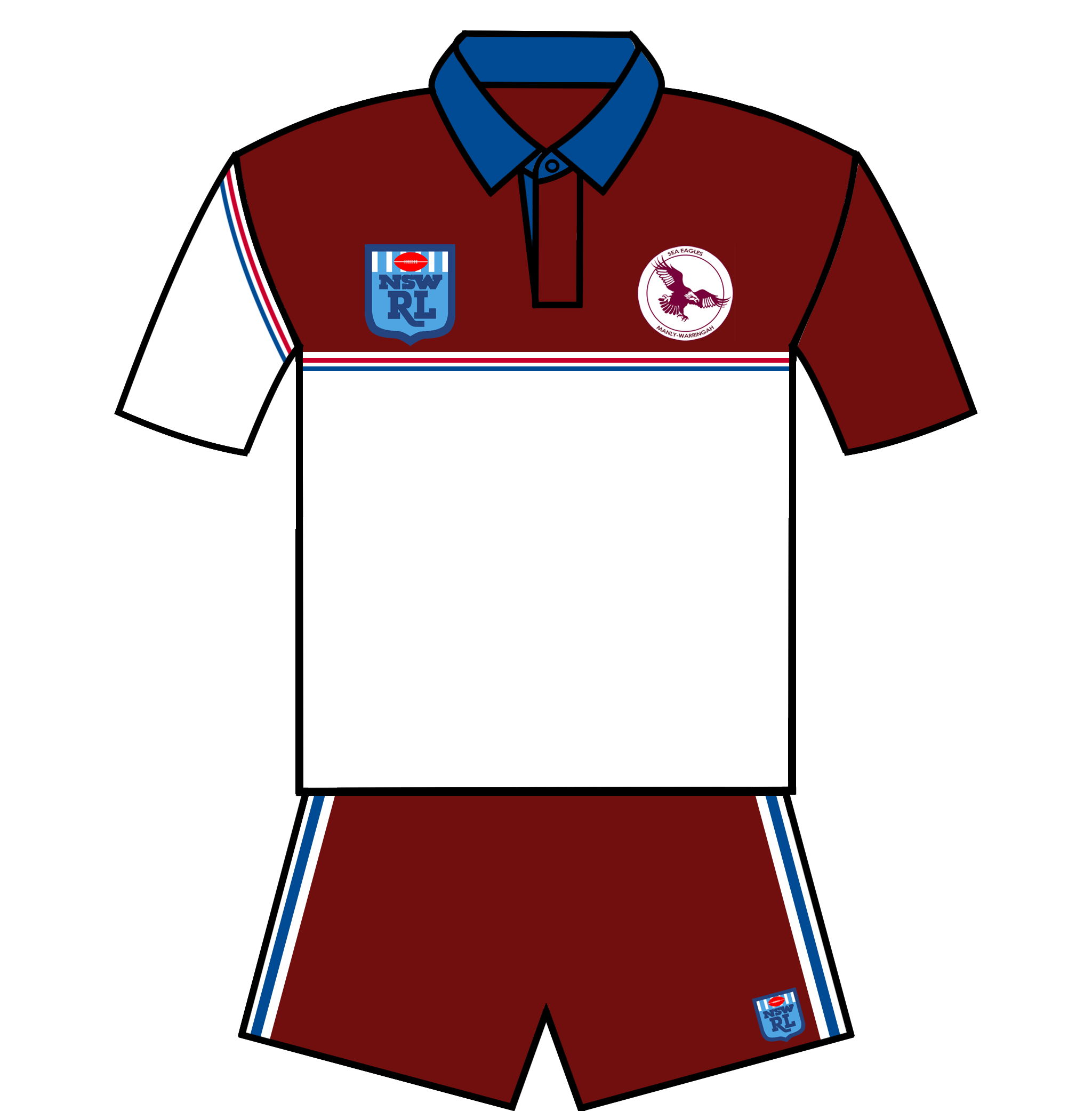
Manly-Warringah; Sea Eagles 47th season Ground: Brookvale Oval; Coach: Bob Fulton; Captain: Geoff Toovey

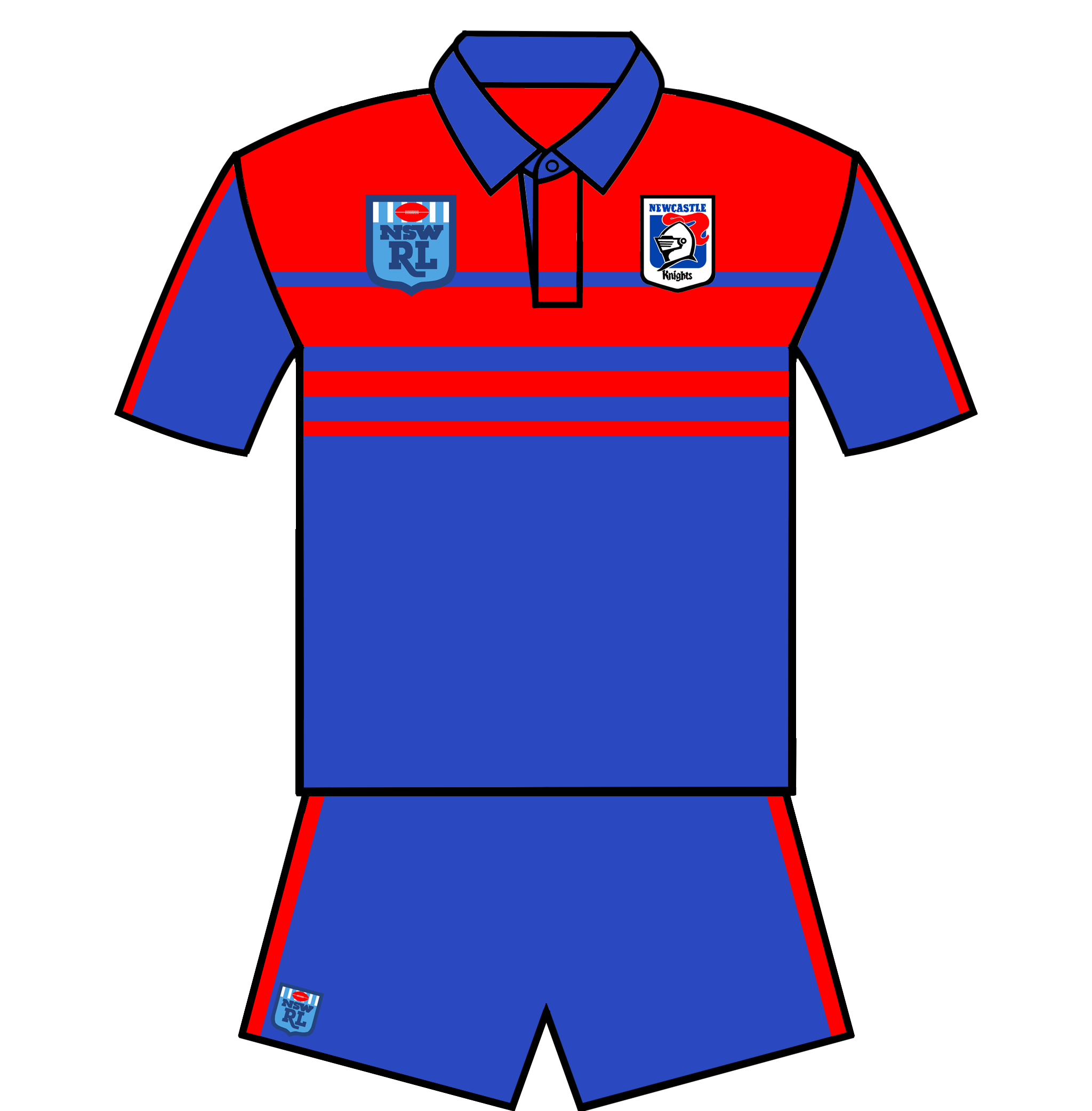
Newcastle; Knights 6th season Ground: Marathon Stadium; Coach: David Waite; Captain: Michael Hagan

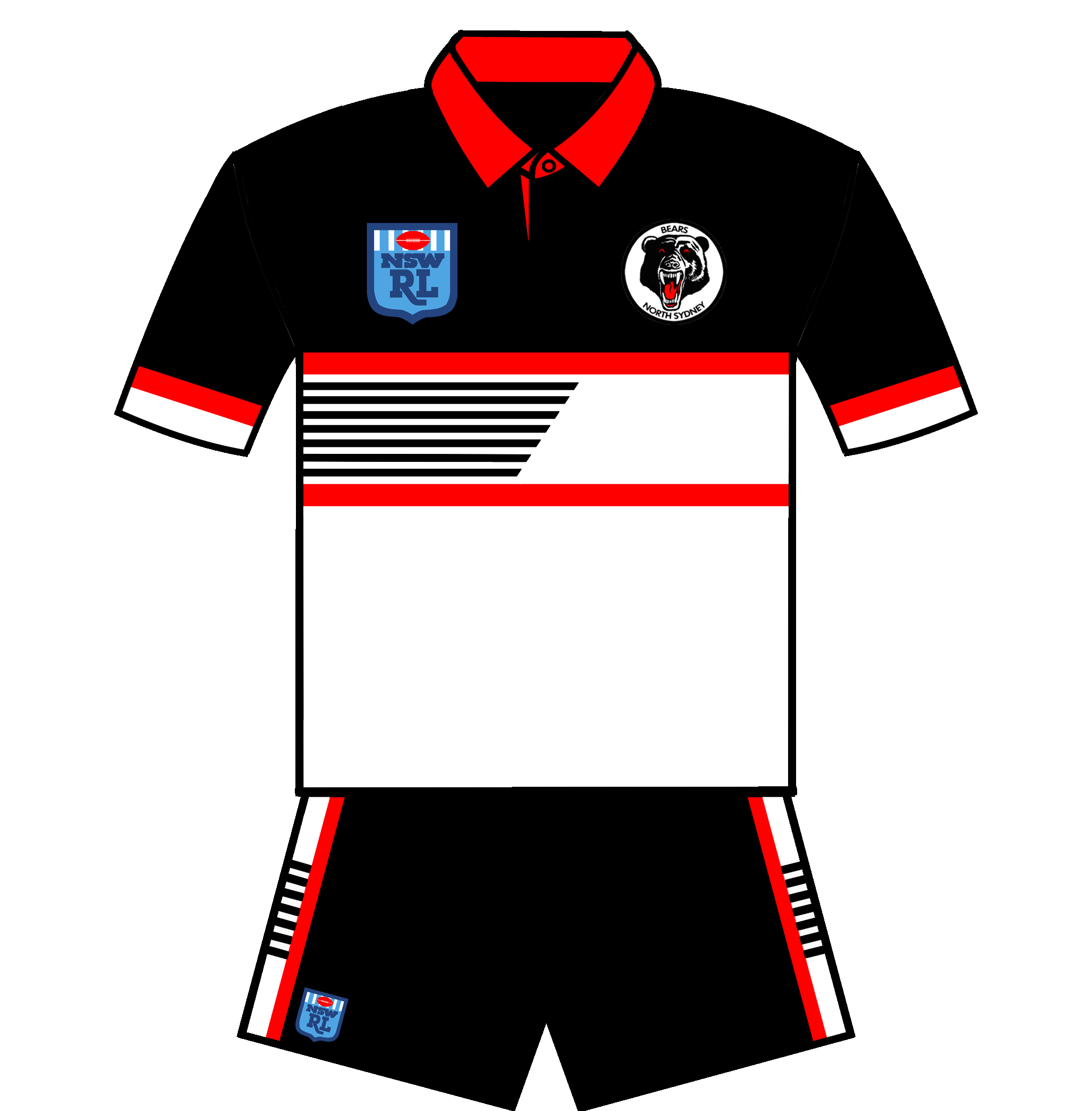
North Sydney; Bears 86th season Ground: North Sydney Oval; Coach: Peter Louis; Captain: Tony Rea

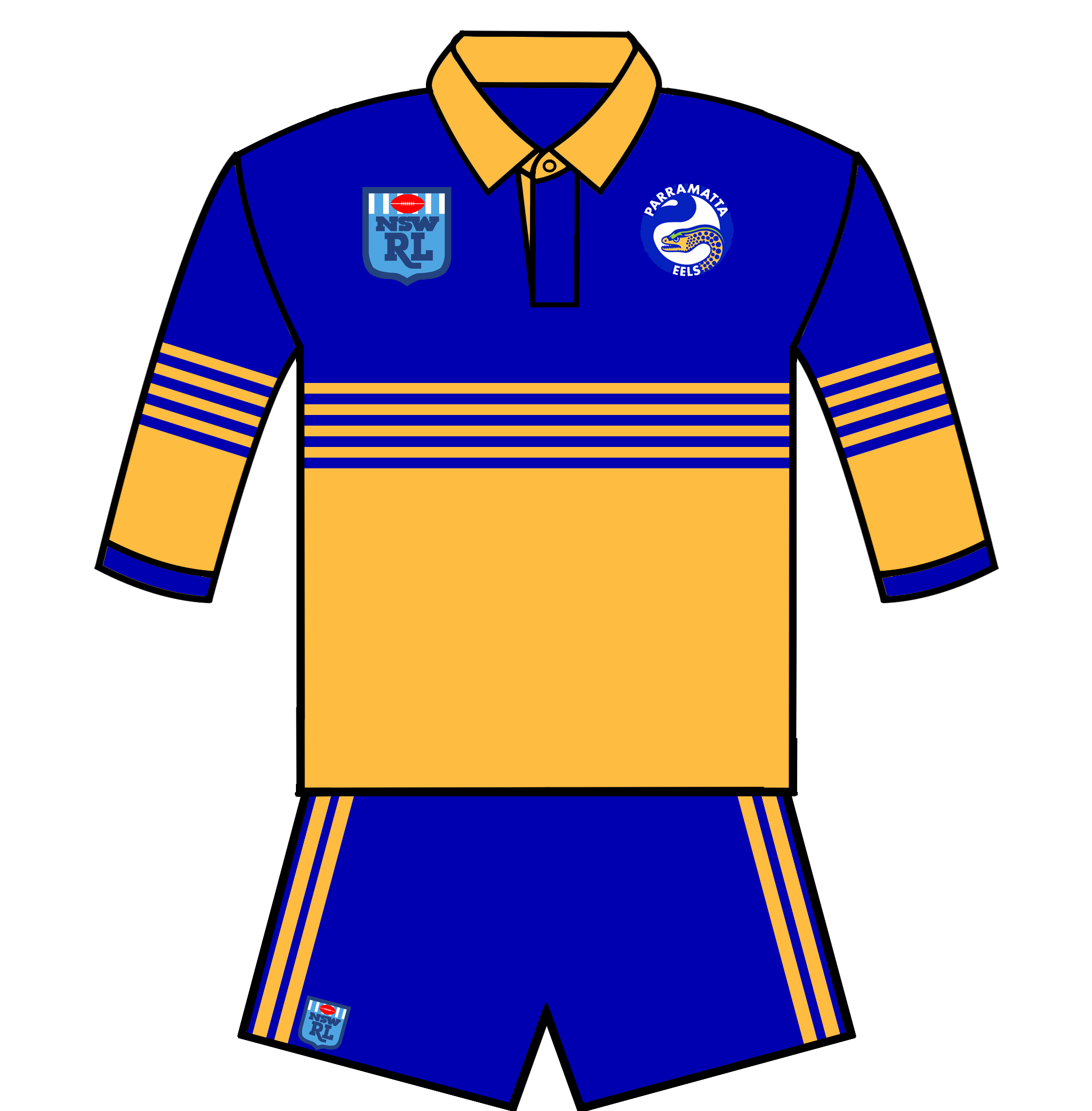
Parramatta; Eels 47th season Ground: Parramatta Stadium; Coach: Mick Cronin; Captain: Brett Kenny

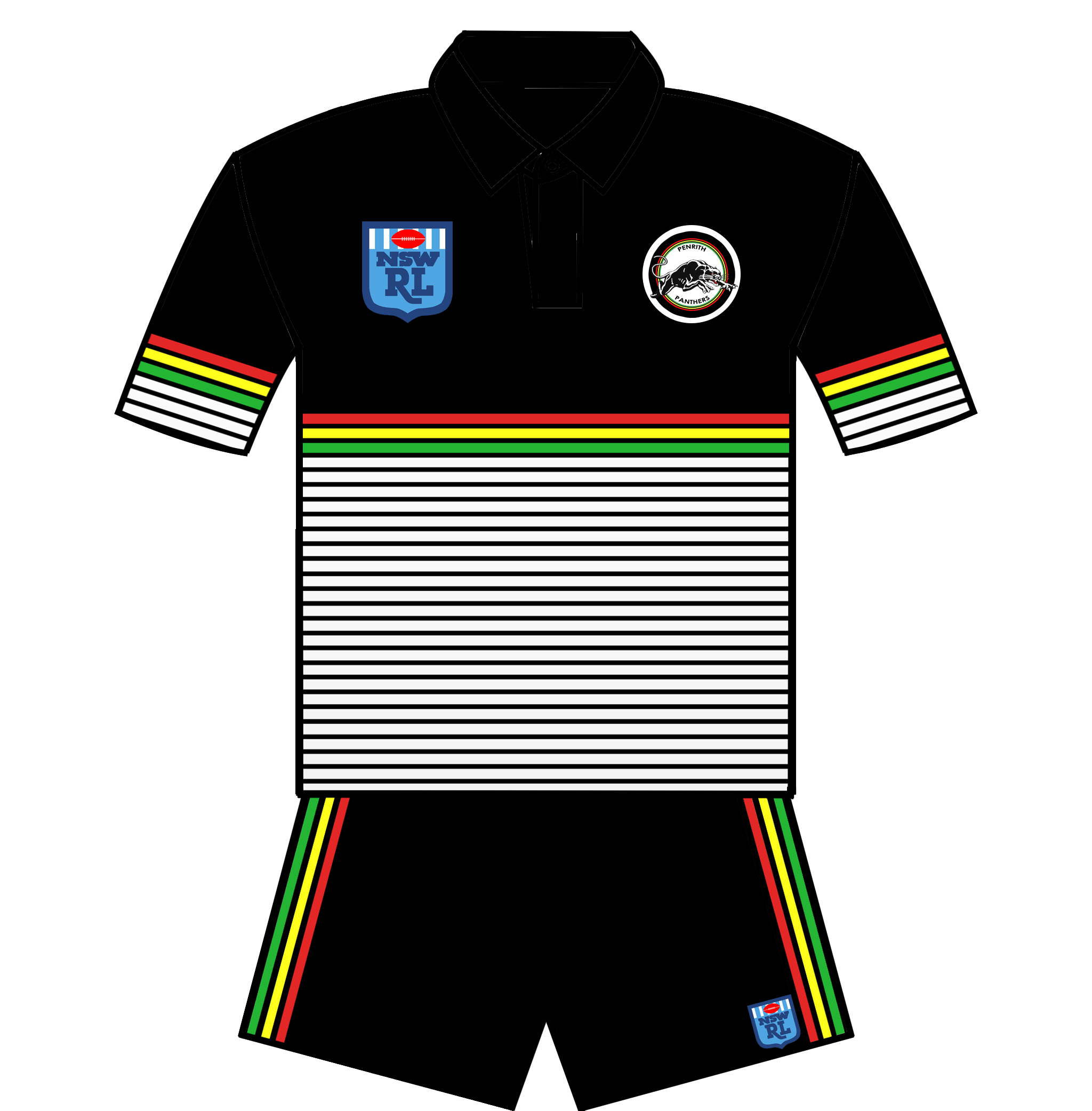
Penrith; Panthers 27th season Ground: Penrith Stadium; Coach: Phil Gould; Captain: John Cartwright

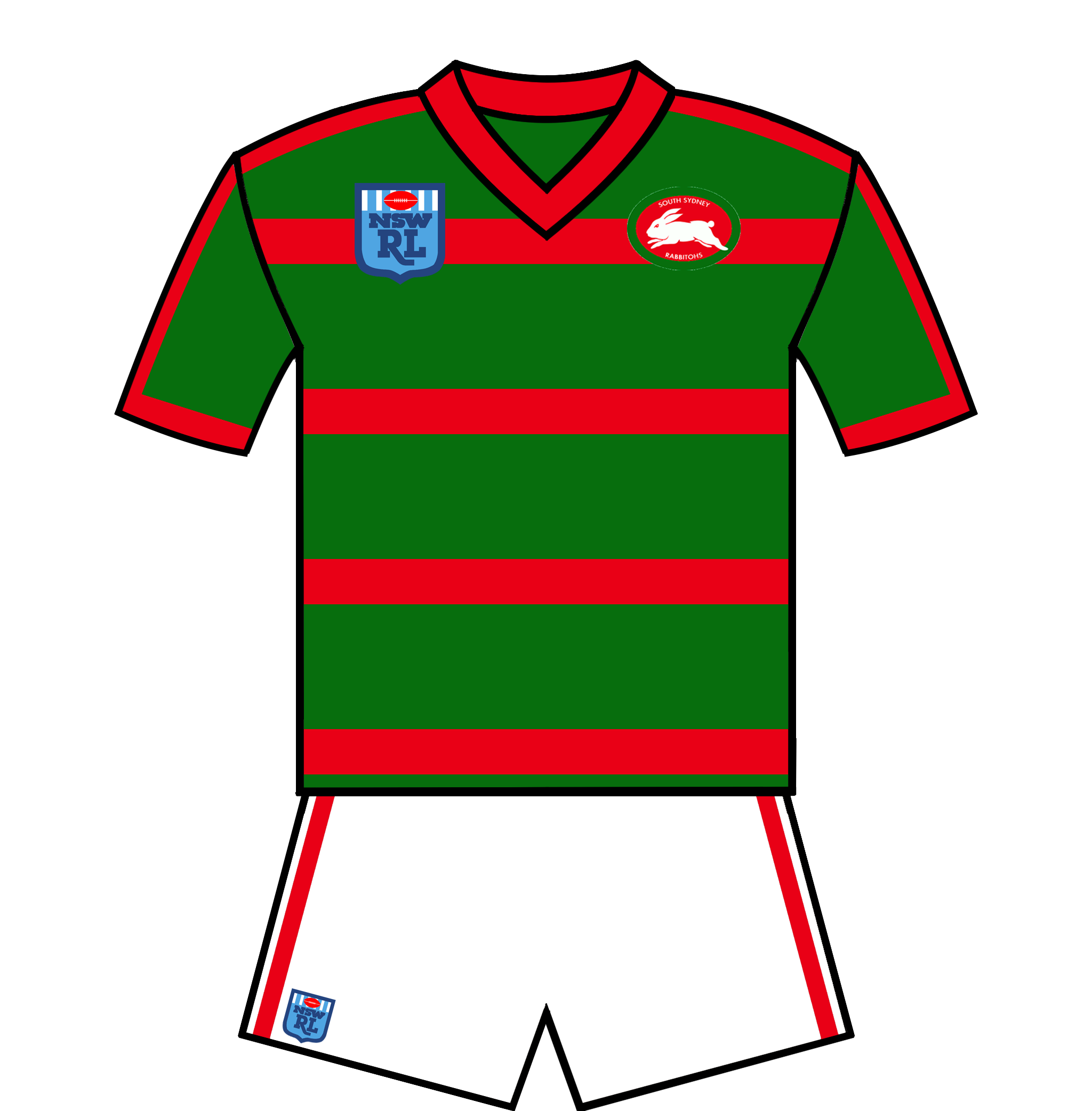
South Sydney; Rabbitohs 86th season Ground: Sydney Football Stadium; Coach: Frank Curry; Captain: Michael Andrews

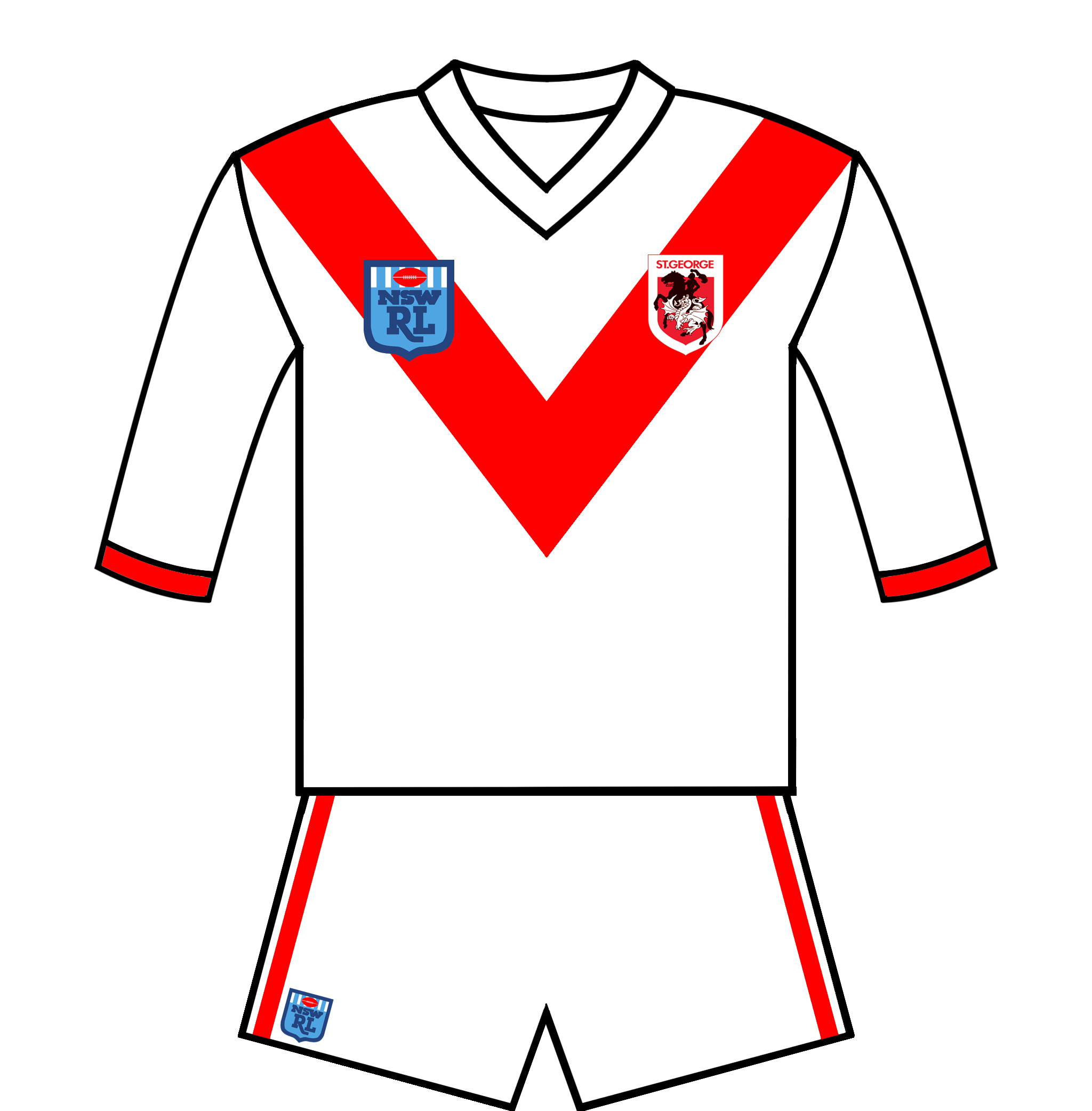
St. George; Dragons 73rd season Ground: Kogarah Oval; Coach: Brian Smith; Captain: Michael Potter

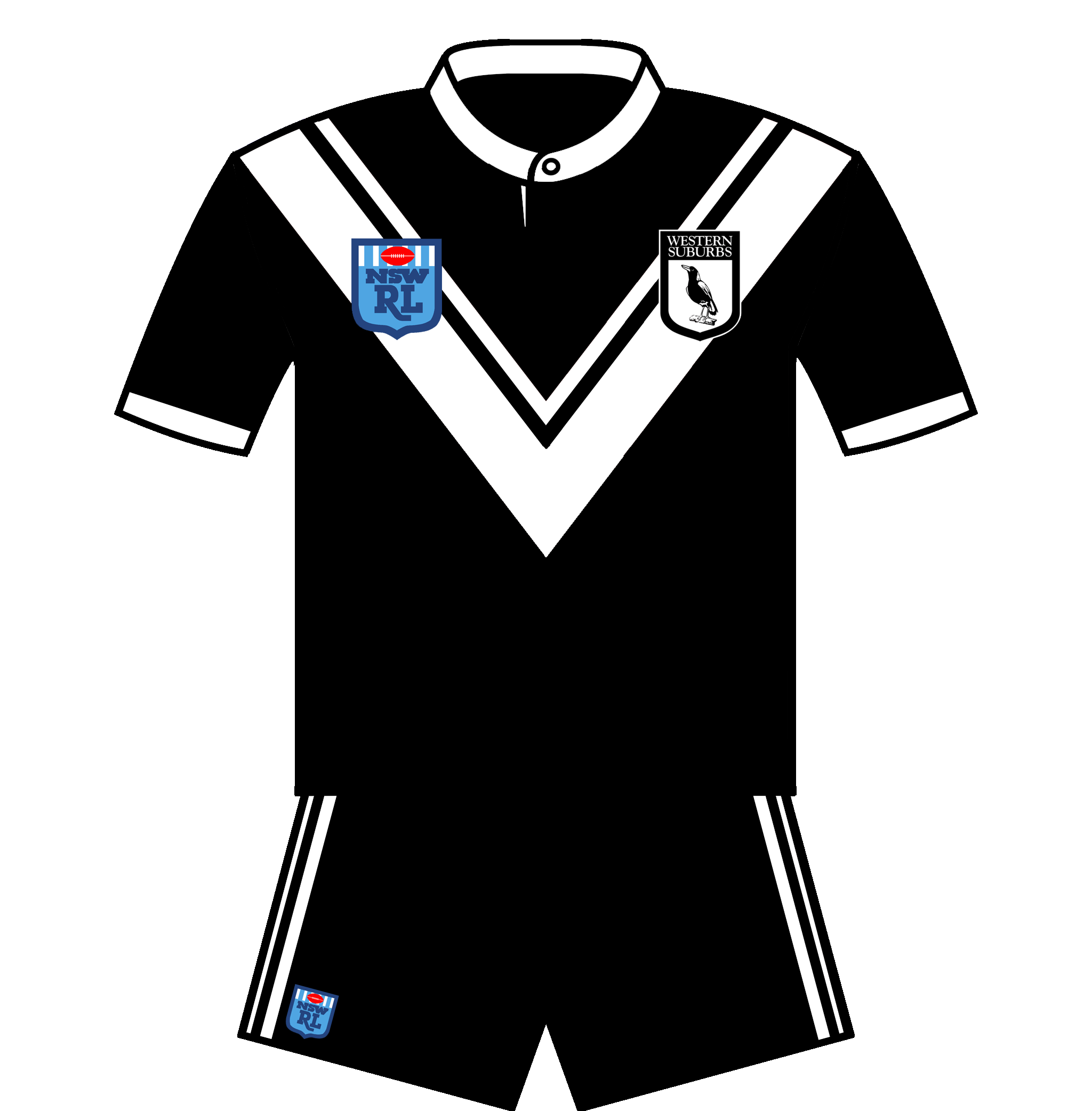
Western Suburbs; Magpies 86th season Ground: Campbelltown Stadium; Coach: Warren Ryan; Captain: Paul Langmack

=== Advertising ===
For the second year running the NSWRL and its advertising agency Hertz Walpole used the 1992 re-recording of "The Best" by Tina Turner and Jimmy Barnes which had been released as "Simply the Best", the title by which the song was more popularly known in Australia.

No new Tina footage was available until she came to Australia at the season's end, so further shots were taken from the 1992 Tina and Jimmy black & white film clip that accompanied the song's release and used in amongst the usual previous season action and pre-season training images.

The League and Winfield enjoyed additional advertising exposure late in the season when Tina aligned an Australian leg of her 1993 tour with the NSWRL's final series. She performed on-stage at the Grand Final, presented the victor's trophy and performed the next week in a number of full-scale rock'n'roll shows with her band at the Sydney Entertainment Centre.

=== Ladder ===
Pos	Team	Pld	W	D	L	PF	PA	PD	Pts	Qualification
1	Canterbury-Bankstown Bulldogs	22	17	0	5	464	254	+210	34	Advance to finals series
2	St. George Dragons	22	17	0	5	418	258	+160	34	Advance to finals series
3	Canberra Raiders	22	16	1	5	587	272	+315	33	Advance to finals series
4	Manly Warringah Sea Eagles	22	16	0	6	442	232	+210	32	Advance to finals series
5	Brisbane Broncos (P)	22	16	0	6	517	330	+187	32	Advance to finals series
6	North Sydney Bears	22	14	1	7	448	325	+123	29	
7	Illawarra Steelers	22	12	0	10	373	253	+120	24	
8	Eastern Suburbs Roosters	22	11	1	10	343	356	−13	23	
9	Newcastle Knights	22	10	0	12	337	381	−44	20	
10	Cronulla-Sutherland Sharks	22	9	0	13	272	399	−127	18	
11	Parramatta Eels	22	9	0	13	237	439	−202	18	
12	Penrith Panthers	22	7	0	15	314	428	−114	14	
13	Western Suburbs Magpies	22	7	0	15	319	475	−156	14	
14	South Sydney Rabbitohs	22	6	0	16	319	560	−241	12	
15	Balmain Tigers (Note: Balmain were deducted two competition points due to a breach of the replacement rule in round 19.)	22	6	1	15	327	412	−85	11	
16	Gold Coast Seagulls	22	1	0	21	229	572	−343	2	

Source: RLP
(P) Premiers

== Finals ==
With one round remaining the Canberra Raiders were outright first on the ladder and favoured to participate in their 4th grand final in just 5 years. This was not to be however as a horrific leg injury sidelined Ricky Stuart for the last round of competition and the finals series. The Raiders went on to lose to Canterbury in round 22 of the competition and then to Brisbane and St George in the finals, all of which they had beat easily during the preceding season. By the end of the season there were only two points separating 1st and 5th. Week one of the finals saw St George easily account for the Canberra Raiders whilst Brisbane brushed aside Manly on their march through to week two. Canberra went into this game with their third halves combination in as many weeks and were unable to overcome the eventual premiers, succumbing to Brisbane 30–12. St. George beat Minor Premiers' Canterbury in the semi-final then had a week off to prepare for a Grand Final rematch with Brisbane who advanced through after beating Canterbury in a close and spiteful Preliminary Final.

Home	Score	Away	Match information
Home	Score	Away	Date and time	Venue	Referee	Crowd
Qualifying finals
St. George Dragons	31–10	Canberra Raiders	4 September 1993	Sydney Football Stadium	Bill Harrigan	31,429
Manly Sea Eagles	10–36	Brisbane Broncos	5 September 1993	Sydney Football Stadium	Greg McCallum	38,432
Semi-finals
Canberra Raiders	12–30	Brisbane Broncos	11 September 1993	Sydney Football Stadium	Bill Harrigan	33,893
Canterbury Bulldogs	12–27	St. George Dragons	12 September 1993	Sydney Football Stadium	Greg McCallum	41,384
Preliminary final
Canterbury Bulldogs	16–23	Brisbane Broncos	19 September 1993	Sydney Football Stadium	Greg McCallum	34,821
Grand final
St. George Dragons	6–14	Brisbane Broncos	26 September 1993	Sydney Football Stadium	Greg McCallum	42,329

=== Chart ===
Qualifying final
2	St. George	31
3	Canberra	10
4	Manly	10
5	Brisbane	36

Major semi final
1	Canterbury	12
St. George	27
Minor semi final
Canberra	12
Brisbane	30

Preliminary final
Canterbury	16
Brisbane	23

Grand final
St. George	6
Brisbane	14

== Grand Final ==
1993 NSWRL Grand Final
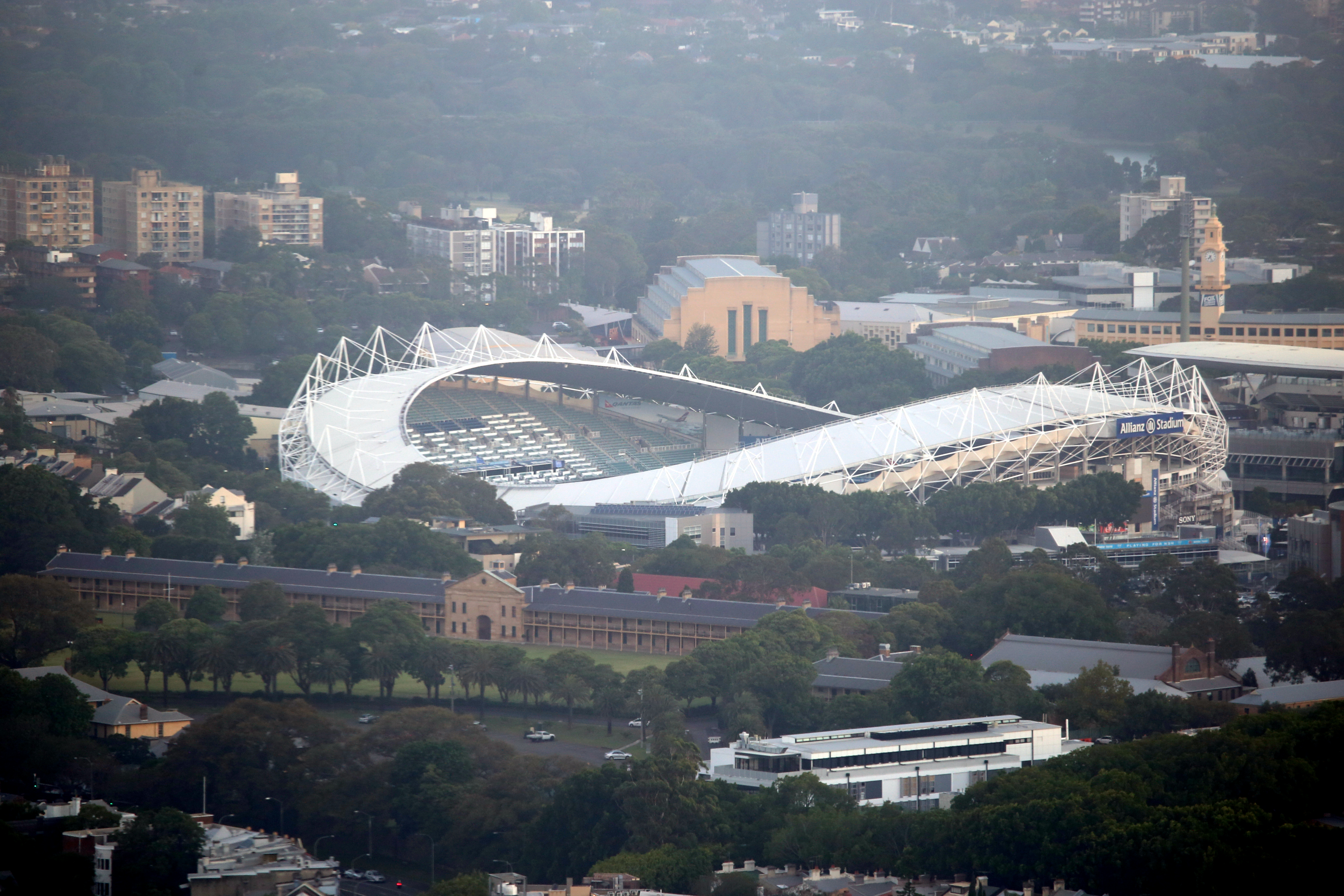
- An aerial view of the Sydney Football Stadium, where the match was played

St. George Dragons	Brisbane Broncos
6	14
	1	2	Total
STG	2	4	6
BRI	10	4	14
- Date: 26 September 1993
- Stadium: Sydney Football Stadium
- Location: Sydney
- Clive Churchill Medal: Brad Mackay (STG)
- Australian National anthem: Anthony Warlow
- Referee: Greg McCallum
- Attendance: 42,329

Broadcast partners
- Broadcasters: Nine Network
- Commentators: Ken Sutcliffe (host); Ray Warren; Peter Sterling; Paul Vautin; Steve Roach & Gene Miles (sideline)

For the second year running Brisbane and St George played out the decider. The Broncos had momentum coming into the Grand Final, with only one loss in their last six matches. Even though that loss was to St. George in the final regular season round, Brisbane remained underdogs. In sunny conditions, a ground record crowd for the Sydney Football Stadium of 42,239 was on hand for the match.

=== Teams ===
The teams for the Grand Final were largely unchanged from their meeting in the 1992 Grand Final. Only one Broncos player (Peter Ryan), and four of the Dragons (Jason Stevens, Nathan Brown, Gorden Tallis and Phil Blake) had not played in the previous decider. It was also Glenn Lazarus' fifth consecutive Grand Final appearance, having appeared the previous year's for Brisbane and the three years' before that with the Canberra Raiders. It was also David Barnhill's fifth consecutive Grand Final appearance, having appeared the previous year for St. George and the three years' before that with the Canberra Raiders.

Team details
St. George Dragons		Position	Brisbane Broncos
Name	Number	Position	Number	Name
Mick Potter (c)	1	Fullback	1	Julian O'Neill
Ricky Walford	2	Wing	2	Michael Hancock
Mark Coyne	3	Centre	3	Steve Renouf
Graeme Bradley	4	Centre	4	Chris Johns
Ian Herron	5	Wing	5	Willie Carne
Tony Smith	6	Five eighth	6	Kevin Walters
Noel Goldthorpe	7	Half back	7	Allan Langer (c)
Tony Priddle	8	Prop forward	8	Glenn Lazarus
Wayne Collins	9	Hooker	9	Kerrod Walters
Jason Stevens	10	Prop forward	10	Mark Hohn
David Barnhill	11	Second row	11	Trevor Gillmeister
Scott Gourley	12	Second row	12	Alan Cann
Brad Mackay	13	Lock forward	13	Terry Matterson
Nathan Brown	22	Interchange	14	Andrew Gee
Gorden Tallis	24	Interchange	15	John Plath
Phil Blake	40	Interchange	16	Peter Ryan
Jeff Hardy	41	Interchange
Brian Smith		Coach		Wayne Bennett

=== Entertainment ===
In the pre-match performance, Tina Turner performed "The Best" on stage at the Sydney Football Stadium alongside her saxophonist, US session musician Timmy Cappello.

Theatre performer Anthony Warlow and then star of the Australian production of The Phantom of the Opera, sung the Australian National anthem.

=== First half ===
During the first minute of the game, St. George prop forward Jason Stevens suffered a badly broken thumb and would take no further part in the match. Dragons winger Mark Coyne also left the field briefly due to injury, but would play on. Following a Tony Priddle error, the Broncos opened the scoring in the 21st minute after Kevin Walters threw a dummy 40 metres out and sliced through the St. George line then passed back inside to Chris Johns who dived over. Julian O'Neill converted the try to give Brisbane a 6–0 lead. About seven minutes later it was Kevin Walters again who set up Terry Matterson on his inside to cross for a soft try from close range. O'Neill missed his kick so Brisbane led 10–0 with seven minutes of the first half remaining. Just before halftime Andrew Gee gave away a penalty in the ruck and St. George decided to take the two points, meaning the score at the break was 10–2 in favour of the Broncos. Brisbane had 57% of the possession in the first half, making only four handling errors, while St. George had made eight handling errors and had made 22 more tackles than the Broncos.

=== Second half ===
St. George opened the scoring in the second half, again with Ian Herron taking a shot at goal following a penalty from Andrew Gee, bringing the deficit back to a converted try at 10–4. Brisbane withstood further raids from the Dragons and when another penalty was awarded to St. George in front of the posts they again took the two points, with Herron making it three from three so the score was 10–6 in favour of the Broncos with just under 20 minutes remaining. However, these would be the last points the Dragons would score with the Broncos getting in close to St. Georges line before passing the ball out to Willie Carne on the right wing to dive over in the corner for the game's third try in the 68th minute. O'Neill missed the sideline conversion attempt so the score was 14–6 with only 10 minutes of the match remaining. There were no more points before the final siren, with Brisbane's defence able to keep out St. George and force the Dragons into further errors.

After the match Tina Turner presented the trophy to Brisbane captain Allan Langer and joined in Brisbane's post-game victory song.

Despite being on the losing side, Dragons lock forward Brad Mackay was chosen by NSWRL General Manager John Quayle, Don Furner and two St. George legends, John Raper and Reg Gasnier to be awarded the Clive Churchill Medal as man-of-the-match, with Queensland premier Wayne Goss questioning the decision. By retaining their title Brisbane had also become the first team in history to win a premiership from fifth spot. The match also drew remarkably strong ratings nationwide.

=== Scoreboard ===
1993 NSWRL Winfield Cup Grand Final

Sunday, 26 September
15:00 AEST (UTC+10)

St. George Dragons	6 – 14	Brisbane Broncos
Goals: 3 Herron pen 40', pen 48', pen 62' (3/3)	1st: 2–10; 2nd: 4–4	Tries: 3 Johns 21'; Matterson 30'; Carne 68'; Goals: 1 O'Neill 23' (1/3)

Sydney Football Stadium, Sydney
Attendance: 42,329
Referee: Greg McCallum
Clive Churchill Medal: Brad Mackay (St George)

=== Other matches ===
The North Sydney Bears won the reserve grade Grand Final 5–4 against the Newcastle Knights. It was the Bears third-straight reserve grade premiership victory, with Peter Jackson scoring the winning field goal before half time to break a 4-all tie. There were no points scored in the second half.

In the under-23s Presidents Cup Grand Final, the Eastern Suburbs Roosters defeated the Cronulla-Sutherland Sharks 17–4, after leading 13–0 at half time.

== Player statistics ==
The following statistics are as of the conclusion of Round 22.

Top 5 point scorers

Points	Player	Tries	Goals	Field goals
180	Daryl Halligan	3	83	2
156	David Furner	4	70	0
134	Terry Matterson	5	57	0
127	Jason Taylor	3	56	3
124	Ivan Cleary	8	46	0

Top 5 try scorers

Tries	Player
19	Noa Nadruku
16	Sean Hoppe
15	Steve Renouf
14	Willie Carne
14	Jamie Ainscough

Top 5 goal scorers

Goals	Player
83	Daryl Halligan
70	David Furner
57	Terry Matterson
56	Jason Taylor
46	Ivan Cleary

== Attendances ==
The regular season attendances for the 1993 season aggregated to a total of 2,625,467 at an average of 14,426 per game.

Due to a sponsorship dispute between the Castlemaine XXXX sponsored Queensland Rugby League and the Powers Brewery sponsored Brisbane Broncos, the defending premiers moved from the 32,500 capacity Lang Park to the 59,000 capacity ANZ Stadium for 1993. At the host venue of the 1982 Commonwealth Games, the Broncos set a new league record average home attendance of 43,200. This was almost 27,000 more than the next best for the season set by Canterbury-Bankstown.

The highest ten regular season match attendances:

Crowd	Venue	Home team	Opponent	Round
58,593	ANZ Stadium	Brisbane Broncos	St. George Dragons	Round 22
57,212	ANZ Stadium	Brisbane Broncos	Gold Coast Seagulls	Round 12
54,751	ANZ Stadium	Brisbane Broncos	Canterbury-Bankstown Bulldogs	Round 17
51,517	ANZ Stadium	Brisbane Broncos	Parramatta Eels	Round 3
46,001	ANZ Stadium	Brisbane Broncos	Canberra Raiders	Round 4
40,733	ANZ Stadium	Brisbane Broncos	Western Suburbs Magpies	Round 10
39,193	ANZ Stadium	Brisbane Broncos	Balmain Tigers	Round 14
35,904	ANZ Stadium	Brisbane Broncos	Penrith Panthers	Round 6
35,641	Sydney Cricket Ground	St. George Dragons	Canterbury-Bankstown Bulldogs	Round 21
31,896	ANZ Stadium	Brisbane Broncos	South Sydney Rabbitohs	Round 14

== See also ==
- 1993 State of Origin series
