= Dean Whare =

New Zealand international rugby league footballer

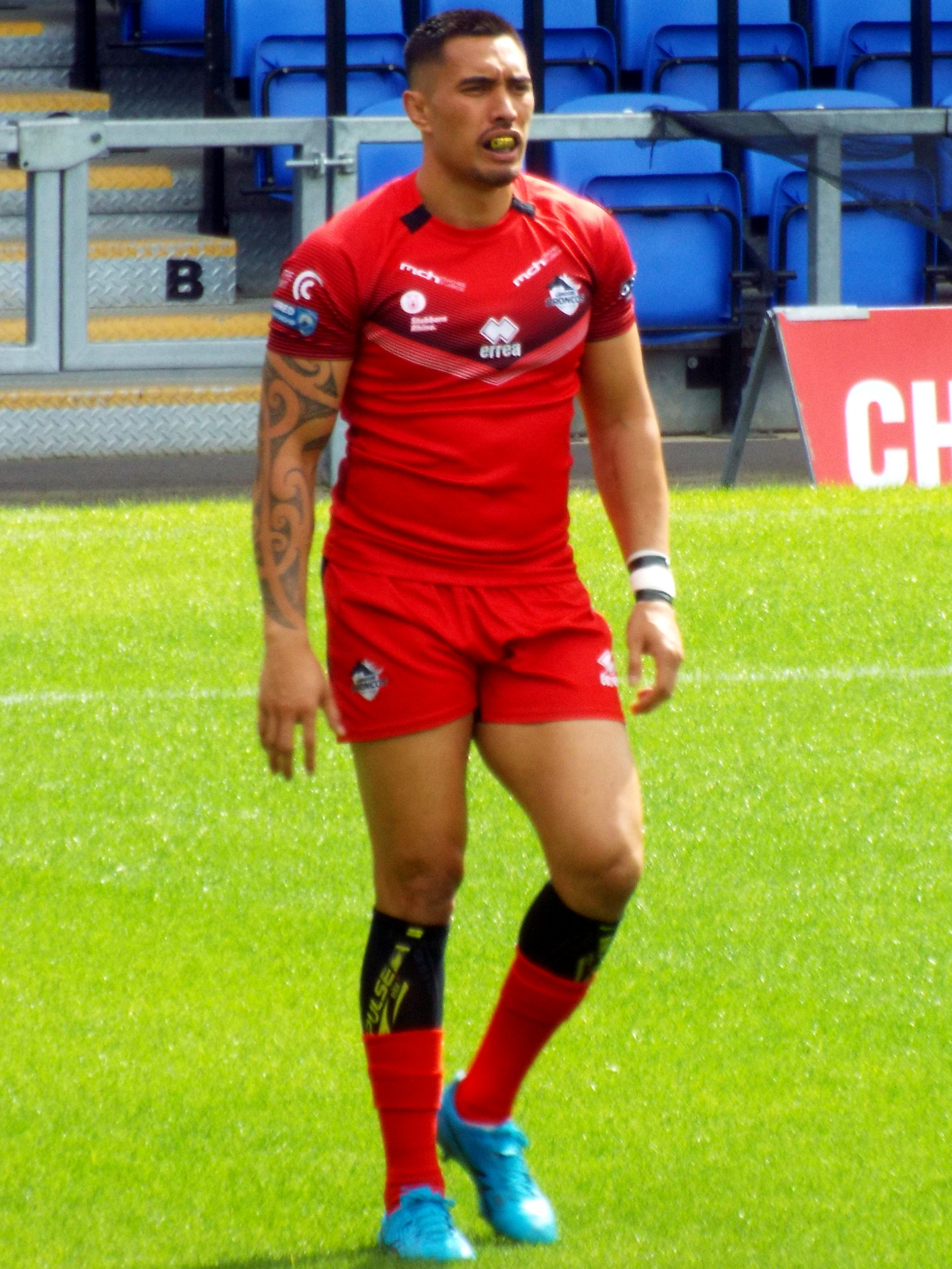

Personal information
- Full name: Dean Whare
- Born: 22 January 1990 (age 36) Rotorua, Bay of Plenty, New Zealand
- Height: 6 ft 1 in (1.85 m)
- Weight: 15 st 2 lb (96 kg)

Playing information
- Position: Centre, Wing, Fullback
Club
| Years | Team | Pld | T | G | FG | P |
|---|---|---|---|---|---|---|
| 2010–12 | Manly Sea Eagles | 25 | 9 | 0 | 0 | 36 |
| 2013–20 | Penrith Panthers | 130 | 31 | 0 | 0 | 124 |
| 2021–22 | Catalans Dragons | 38 | 6 | 0 | 0 | 24 |
| 2023 | Pia Donkeys | 9 | 5 | 0 | 0 | 20 |
| 2023 | London Broncos | 13 | 12 | 0 | 0 | 48 |
| | Total | 215 | 63 | 0 | 0 | 252 |
Representative
| Years | Team | Pld | T | G | FG | P |
| 2012–17 | New Zealand | 20 | 5 | 0 | 0 | 20 |
| 2019 | Māori All Stars | 1 | 0 | 0 | 0 | 0 |
- Source: As of 22 November 2026

Dean Whare pronounced (FAR-dEH) (born 22 January 1990) is a New Zealand professional rugby league footballer who plays as a halfback for the Glebe Dirty Reds in the NSWRL Ron Massey Cup, and New Zealand and the New Zealand Māori at international level.

Whare previously played for the Manly Warringah Sea Eagles and the Penrith Panthers in the NRL, and played as a winger and fullback earlier in his career.

== Early years ==
Whare was born in Rotorua, New Zealand. He is of Māori descent.

He moved to Sydney, Australia as a 13-year-old and played his junior rugby league with Penshurst RSL and Arncliffe scots before being signed the St George-Illawarra Dragons.

== Playing career ==
He played in the 2008 and 2009 Toyota Cups before signing with the Manly-Warringah Sea Eagles for 2010.

=== 2010 ===
In round 12 of the 2010 NRL season, Whare made his NRL debut against the North Queensland Cowboys at 1300SMILES Stadium, scoring three tries in Manly's 24–20 win, the first time a player has scored three tries in his top-grade debut for the Manly-Warringah Sea Eagles. Whare played in 4 matches and scored 3 tries in his debut year in the NRL.

At the end of the season, Whare was selected for the Junior Kiwis.

=== 2011 ===
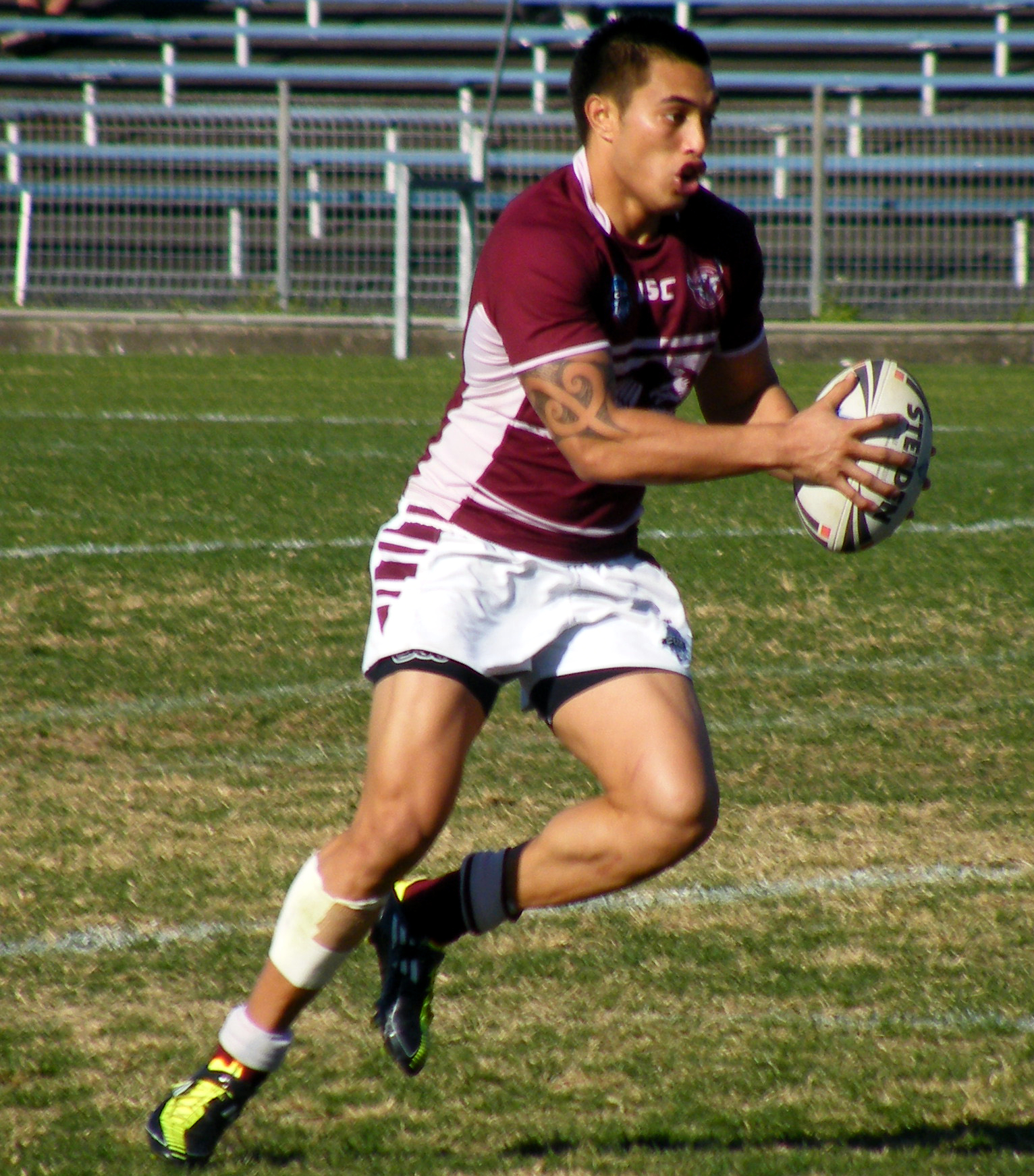
Whare playing for the Sea Eagles in 2011

Whare played in one match for the Manly-Warringah Sea Eagles in the 2011 NRL season, playing in round 26 against the Brisbane Broncos at Suncorp Stadium.

=== 2012 ===
In 2012, Whare divided his playing time between the Manly-Warringah Sea Eagles NRL side, and the New South Wales Cup. This was due to Manly's established backline which included representative players Brett Stewart, Steve Matai, team captain Jamie Lyon, Jorge Taufua and David Williams. Becoming something of a "Mr Fix-it" for the Sea Eagles when called into the top grade, Whare played in the centres, on the wing, and at fullback during the season. On 30 May 2012, Whare announced that he had signed for the Penrith Panthers from 2013, citing the opportunity to establish himself as one of the NRL's top centres. Despite expressing a desire to stay at Manly beyond 2012, Whare felt his opportunities to play centre was limited at Manly due to the presence of club co-captain Jamie Lyon and Kiwi international centre Steve Matai. Whare finished the 2012 NRL season with playing in 21 matches and scoring six tries for the Manly club.

Whare was selected to make international debut for New Zealand against Australia in the October test at 1300SMILES Stadium. Whare played at centre in the Kiwis 12–20 loss.

=== 2013 ===
In round 1 of the 2013 NRL season, against the Canberra Raiders, Whare made his club debut for the Penrith Panthers at fullback in a 32–10 win at Penrith Stadium. Whare started the season playing at fullback until he cemented a centre position from round 7 onwards. In round 7, against the Parramatta Eels, Whare scored his first try club try for Penrith in the 44–12 win at Penrith Stadium. For the 2013 ANZAC Test, Whare was selected to play for New Zealand at centre in the Kiwis 12–32 loss against Australia. Whare finished the 2013 NRL season with him playing in all of Penrith's 24 matches and scoring five tries. Whare was selected in the New Zealand 2013 World Cup squad, playing in 5 matches. He scored 2 tries against Papua New Guinea in the Kiwis 56–10 win. Whare played at centre in the Kiwis 2–34 loss to Australia in the World Cup final at Old Trafford. On 13 December 2013, Whare agreed to a three-year contract extension with the Penrith Panthers, until the end of the 2017 season.

=== 2014 ===
Whare was selected for New Zealand in the 2014 ANZAC Test against Australia at centre in the Kiwis 18–30 loss at the SFS. Whare played in 26 matches and scored 12 tries in the Panthers 2014 NRL season.

On 7 October 2014, Whare was selected in the New Zealand national rugby league team final 24-man squad for the 2014 Four Nations series. Whare played at centre in the Kiwis 22–18 Four Nations final win over Australia at Westpac Stadium.

=== 2015 ===
Whare finished the 2015 NRL season with him playing in 13 matches and six tries for Penrith.

On 8 October, Whare was selected in the 23-man New Zealand squad to tour England.

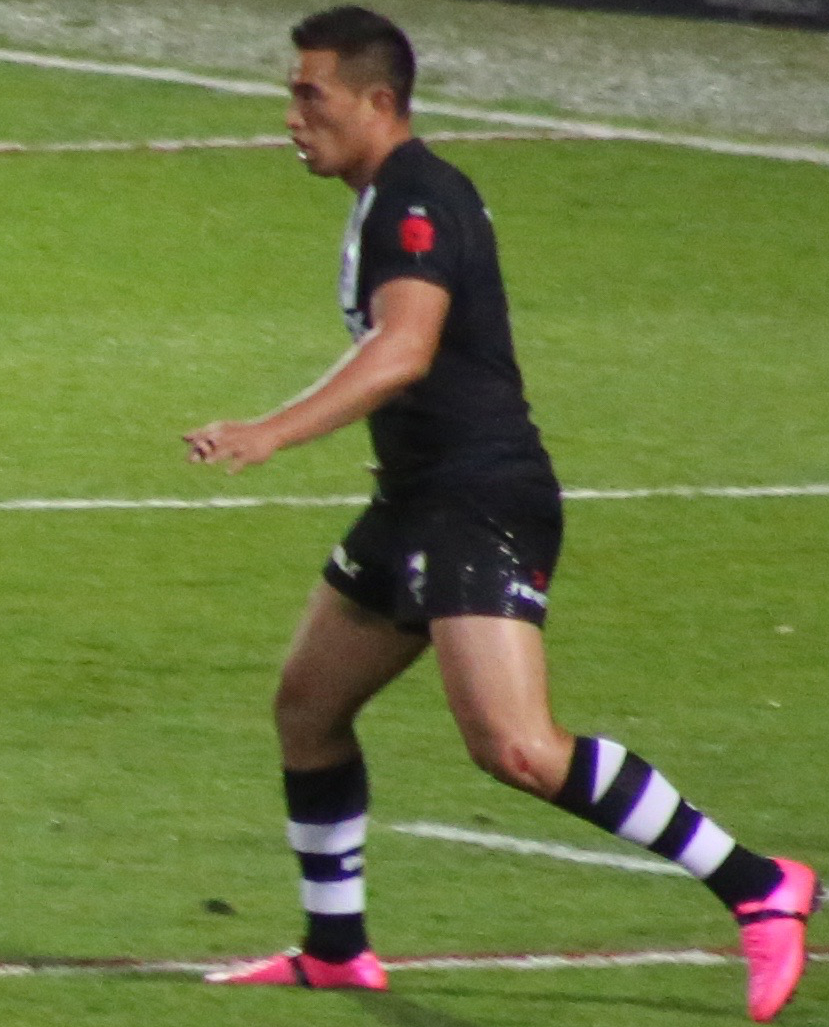
Whare playing for the Kiwis in 2015

Whare played in all 3 matches against England at centre in the Kiwis' 2–1 Baskerville Shield series loss.

=== 2016 ===
Whare played in the 18–16 loss at Penrith Stadium in round 2 against the Canterbury-Bankstown Bulldogs. This was his only match of the season after battling a calf tear injury before a season-ending knee injury happened during training.

=== 2017 ===
In round 1, against the St. George Illawarra Dragons, Whare made his return for Penrith playing on the wing in the 10–42 loss at Jubilee Oval.

=== 2018 ===
Whare made 24 appearances for Penrith in the 2018 NRL season as the club finished 5th on the table and qualified for the finals. Whare played in both finals games as Penrith reached the elimination final against Cronulla-Sutherland but lost 21–20 at the Sydney Football Stadium which ended their season.

=== 2019 ===
Whare made a total of 18 appearances for Penrith in the 2019 NRL season as the club finished a disappointing 10th place and missed out for the finals for the first time since 2015.

=== 2020 ===
Whare only made a total of 8 appearances for Penrith in the 2020 NRL Season, failing to score a try as he lost his spot to Brent Naden for the rest of the season after Round 10 as the Panthers won 17 consecutive matches to reach the grand final, which they lost 26-20 to the Melbourne Storm.

=== 2021 ===
On 8 February, it was reported that he had signed for the Catalans Dragons in the Super League.

In round 1 of the 2021 Super League season, he made his debut for Catalans Dragons against Hull KR in which Catalans won 29-28.

In round 5, Whare scored two tries for Catalans in their victory over Wakefield Trinity. On 9 October, Whare played for Catalans in their 2021 Super League Grand Final defeat against St. Helens.

=== 2022 ===
On 24 October 2022 it was reported that he had signed for Baroudeurs de Pia XIII in the Elite One Championship. After the conclusion of the season, Whare joined RFL Championship side the London Broncos.

=== 2023 ===
On 15 October, Whare played in the London Broncos upset Million Pound Game victory over Toulouse Olympique.

=== 2024 ===
On 16 January it was reported that he had returned to Pia Donkeys in the Elite One Championship. On 14 September, Whare played in Glebe's Ron Massey Cup grand final victory over Wentworthville.
