= Tony Priddle =

Australian rugby league footballer

Personal information
- Full name: Anthony Priddle
- Born: 23 June 1970 (age 56) Yamba, New South Wales, Australia

Playing information
- Position: Prop
Club
Years	Team	Pld	T	G	FG	P
1990–95	St. George Dragons	103	11	0	0	44

Tony Priddle is an Australian former rugby league footballer who played in the 1990s.

== Playing career ==
Priddle came to the St. George Dragons from Maclean, New South Wales in 1990. He played six seasons at St. George between 1990-1995 as a Prop forward. He played in two grand finals for St. George Dragons in 1992 and 1993. Priddle retired after completing the 1995 season.

After leaving St. George at the end of the 1995 ARL season, Priddle signed with the rival Super League competition during the Super League war. He later played reserve grade for Canterbury-Bankstown and the Burleigh Bears. Priddle also spent one season playing rugby league in Paris. In 2019, Priddle spoke about his time during those years saying "Yes, the Dragons went with the ARL but I had a meeting with Lachlan Murdoch and he explained his 'vision' for the game ... and offered to triple my salary. About that time I was having arguments with Smithy - my form was poor and I wasn't doing what he wanted out there - so with all that, it made signing with Super League an easy decision. I copped some flak but not from the players - they understood".

He continued: "Not many people would ever know it, but I went to Canterbury. I played three reserve grade games in 1997, then did my knee and was out for the year. The next year they sent me to play for Paris, which was a great experience, but we got relegated and I didn't have a club anymore. For the final year of my Super League deal, Super League let me play for the Burleigh Bears. I was on $200,000 ... I think that made me the highest-paid player in the Queensland Cup by a fair way (laughs). I stayed another two years after that before hanging up the boots and getting a real job. My wage went from $200K to $32K, so it was a reality check to say the least ... I can see why a lot of players struggle post-football".
