= Arncliffe scots =

Arncliffe Scots

Club information
- Full name: Arncliffe Scots Rugby League Football Club
- Nickname: Scots
- Colours: Black; Red; Yellow
- Founded: 1926

Current details
- Ground: Cahill Park
- Competition: St George District Junior Rugby League Sydney Combined Competition

The Arncliffe Scots are an Australian rugby league football club based in Arncliffe, New South Wales. They compete in the St George Junior Rugby League and Sydney Combined Competition for older grades. Arncliffe Scots were founded in 1926 and have a rich history. Arncliffe Scots hold the record for the most senior championships won by a club with 16 championship wins. The club has also been successful in producing players that have gone on to play in the National Rugby League competition. So far, the club has produced 29 first grade players who have gone on to play for St. George, four Australian international players and six New South Wales players. In 2016, the Arncliffe Scots celebrated their 90th season.

== Notable juniors ==
- Tiger Black
- Ross Kite
- Merv Lees
- Johnny King
- Pat Jarvis
- Bruce Starkey
- Ian Herron
- Wes Naiqama
- Kevin Naiqama
- Dean Whare
- Yaw Kiti Glymin
- George Ndaira
- Joseph Leilua
- Abbas Miski
- Nick Tsougranis

== See also ==
- List of rugby league clubs in Australia
