= Ian Herron =

Ireland international rugby league footballer

Ian Herron (Chook)
Personal information
- Full name: Ian Herron
- Born: 1 October 1970 (age 54); Belfast, Northern Ireland

Playing information
- Position: Fullback, Wing
Club
Years	Team	Pld	T	G	FG	P
1990–95	St George Dragons	47	11	111	0	266
1996	Sydney Tigers	12	3	35	0	82
1997–98	Parramatta Eels	15	4	32	0	80
1999	Gateshead Thunder	25	4	105	0	226
2000	Hull FC	9	1	17	0	38
	Total	108	23	300	0	692
Representative
Years	Team	Pld	T	G	FG	P
2000	Ireland	1	0	0	0	0

Ian Herron (born 1 October 1971) is a Northern Irish former professional rugby league footballer.

== Background ==
Herron was born in Belfast, Northern Ireland. While attending James Cook High School in Kogarah, New South Wales, he played for the Australian Schoolboys team in 1988. Herron played his junior rugby league for the Arncliffe scots before signing with St. George.

== Career ==
Herron played for the St. George Dragons, Balmain Tigers and Parramatta Eels in Australia and Gateshead Thunder and Hull FC in the Super League. His position of choice was on the wing, and he also played at fullback. He played in two Grand Final teams for the St. George Dragons in 1992 and 1993, and was a prolific goal-kicker. He was also noted for his unorthodox goal kicking style.

Herron made his first grade debut for St. George in round 20 1990 against the Gold Coast at Seagulls Stadium. In 1992 and 1993, he played on the wing for St. George in the club's grand final losses against Brisbane. In the 1993 Grand Final, he scored all of St. George's points. Herron was also the club's top point scorer in 1992, 1993 and 1994.

In 1996, Herron joined Balmain who had just one year prior named themselves the "Sydney Tigers" and moved their home games out to Parramatta Stadium at the beginning of the Super League war. He finished as the club's top point scorer in his only season there before signing with Parramatta for the 1997 ARL season.

In his first year at Parramatta, the club reached their first finals series in 11 years. Herron played in both finals matches which ended in defeat by eventual premiers the Newcastle Knights and North Sydney respectively. In both games Parramatta had led at half-time but capitulated in the second half.

Herron spent most of the 1998 NRL season playing for Parramatta's reserve grade team. He was called into the Parramatta side for the club's major semi final against Brisbane which Parramatta won 15–10 at the Queensland Sport and Athletics Centre with Herron kicking three goals.

Herron was an Ireland international and played 1 game at the 2000 Rugby League World Cup.
