= Frank Curry =

Australian rugby league footballer and coach (1950–2022)

Personal information
- Full name: Francis Michael Curry
- Born: 2 May 1950; Sydney, New South Wales, Australia
- Died: 15 May 2022 (aged 72); Sydney, New South Wales, Australia

Playing information
- Height: 175 cm (5 ft 9 in)
- Weight: 78 kg (12 st 4 lb)
- Position: Wing
Club
Years	Team	Pld	T	G	FG	P
1973	South Sydney	4	0	0	0	0

Coaching information
Club
Years	Team	Gms	W	D	L	W%
1991–93	South Sydney	66	20	0	46	30

Frank Curry Jr. (2 May 1950 − 15 May 2022) was an Australian rugby league player and coach of the South Sydney Rabbitohs club.

== Biography ==
A local Souths junior, Curry played his junior career with Zetland United, Moore Park Broncos, and Mascot Jets, He was signed by Souths in 1970. The following season, Curry joined Collegians in the Illawarra Rugby League competition. After 2 seasons with Collegians, Curry returned to South Sydney in 1973. He made his first grade debut in his side's 29−20 loss to Canterbury-Bankstown at Belmore Sports Ground in round 4 of the 1973 season. In Curry's lone season of first grade, he only managed to play four first grade games.

After his playing career ended, Curry coached Waterloo Waratahs in Souths' junior league competition. In 1986, Curry took over coaching Souths in the Presidents Cup competition. In his first season, Souths would end up being victorious in the 1986 Presidents Cup grand final after their 13−0 victory over the Penrith Panthers. In 1988, he became Souths' reserve grade coach, a position which he held until the end of the 1990 season.

After coaching Souths in the lower grades for five seasons, Curry stepped into the fire when he took over the first grade post from long-serving Souths coach George Piggins in 1991. Despite working diligently with a young Souths outfit which included players such as; Mark Carroll, Craig Field, Sean Garlick, Darren Maroon, Rod Maybon, Paul Mellor, John Minto, Jim Serdaris, Manoa Thompson, and Darrell Trindall, Curry's stint as coach was a troubled period in the club's history, plagued with dramas both on and off the field. In all three of Curry's seasons at the helm, Souths won only 20 games and finished all three seasons in 14th position. Curry stood down as first grade coach at the end of the 1993 season. He was subsequently replaced by former South Sydney player and coach Bob McCarthy who would ultimately be replaced by Ken Shine after McCarthy himself stood down from the coaching role after round 3 of the 1994 season.

He died on 15 May 2022, aged 72.
