= List of Gold Coast Titans records =

This article shows the records by the Gold Coast Titans, since their inception in First Grade Competition in 2007. These stats are correct as of round 16 of the 2024 season.

== Individual records ==
=== Most games (100+) ===
Games	Player	Era
187	Moeaki Fotuaika	2018–
173	Mark Minichiello	2007–2014
156	William Zillman	2009–2017
150	Luke Bailey	2007–2014
148	Anthony Don	2014–2021
147	David Mead	2009–2016
144	Ryan James	2010–2020
143	Brian Kelly	2019–2025
142	Phillip Sami	2017–
141	AJ Brimson	2018–
133	Greg Bird	2010–2016
129	Nathan Friend	2007–2011, 2016
128	Jarrod Wallace	2017–2022
125	Matt White	2009–2015
124	Scott Prince	2007–2012
118	Kevin Gordon	2009–2015
117	Ashley Harrison	2008–2014
117	Luke Douglas	2012–2016
104	Ashley Taylor	2016–2021
103	Preston Campbell	2007–2011
102	Anthony Laffranchi	2007–2011
102	Luke O'Dwyer	2007–2013

=== Most points (200+) ===
Points	Player	Tries	Goals	Field goals
719	Scott Prince	32	293	5
365	Aidan Sezer	12	156	5
342	Anthony Don	85	1	0
327	Ashley Taylor	16	130	3
296	Phillip Sami	74	0	0
268	David Mead	67	0	0
266	Kevin Gordon	58	17	0
248	Mat Rogers	32	59	2
Last updated: Round 2, 2021

=== Most points in a match ===
Points	Scorer	Tries	Goals	Field goals	Match details
26	Jayden Campbell	1	11	0	vs. New Zealand Warriors, Cbus Super Stadium, Round 16, 2024 (Gold Coast won 66–6)
18	Scott Prince	1	7	0	vs. Penrith Panthers, Robina Stadium, Round 8, 2010 (Gold Coast won 38–24)
17	Scott Prince	1	6	1	vs. North Queensland Cowboys, Robina Stadium, Round 23, 2010 (Gold Coast won 37–18)
16	Jordan Atkins	4	0	0	vs. North Queensland Cowboys, Robina Stadium, Round 1, 2008 (Gold Coast won 36–18)
16	Scott Prince	1	6	0	vs. Sydney Roosters, Sydney Football Stadium, Round 21, 2012 (Gold Coast won 36–16)

=== Most points in a season (100+) ===
Points	Scorer	Tries	Goals	Field goals	Season details
182	Scott Prince	7	77	0	24 games, 2009
156	Aidan Sezer	1	75	2	22 games, 2013
151	Scott Prince	4	66	3	21 games, 2010
138	Scott Prince	4	61	0	22 games, 2012
124	Scott Prince	5	51	2	16 games, 2008
118	Tyrone Roberts	2	55	0	16 games, 2016
115	Aidan Sezer	3	51	1	18 games, 2015
Last updated: Round 10, 2018

=== Most tries (30+) ===
Tries	Player	Era
85	Anthony Don	2013–2021
85	Phillip Sami	2018–
67	David Mead	2009–2016
58	Kevin Gordon	2009–2015
53	Alofiana Khan-Pereira	2023–2025
42	William Zillman	2007–2011
32	Scott Prince	2007–2012
32	Mat Rogers	2007–2011
32	Mark Minichiello	2007–2014

=== Most tries in a match ===
Tries	Player	Match details
4	Jordan Atkins	vs. North Queensland Cowboys, Skilled Park, Round 1, 2008 (Gold Coast won 36-18)
4	Alofiana Khan-Pereira	vs. New Zealand Warriors, Cbus Super Stadium, Round 16, 2024 (Gold Coast won 66-6)
3	Matthew Petersen	vs. Newcastle Knights, Carrara Stadium, Round 15, 2007 (Gold Coast won 28-22)
3	Matthew Petersen	vs. Brisbane Broncos, Skilled Park, Round 6, 2008 (Gold Coast won 26-24)
3	David Mead	vs. New Zealand Warriors, Skilled Park, Round 9, 2009 (Gold Coast lost 14-34)
3	David Mead	vs. Sydney Roosters, Skilled Park, Round 12, 2010 (Gold Coast lost 16-30)
3	Kevin Gordon	vs. Canterbury-Bankstown Bulldogs, ANZ Stadium, Round 22, 2013 (Gold Coast won 26-16)
3	Dave Taylor	vs. New Zealand Warriors, Cbus Super Stadium, Round 11, 2014 (Gold Coast loss 16-24)
3	James Roberts	vs. Parramatta Eels, Pirtek Stadium, Round 6, 2015 (Gold Coast won 38-16)
3	Anthony Don	vs. Canberra Raiders, GIO Stadium, Round 9, 2015 (Gold Coast lost 56-16)
3	David Fifita	vs. Newcastle Knights, Cbus Super Stadium, Round 5, 2021 (Gold Coast won 42-16)
Last updated: End of Round 13, 2016

=== Most tries in a season ===
Tries	Scorer	Season details
24	Alofiana Khan-Pereira	23 games, 2024
20	Alofiana Khan-Pereira	23 games, 2023
17	David Fifita	22 games, 2021
16	David Mead	24 games, 2011
16	James Roberts	24 games, 2015
15	Kevin Gordon	22 games, 2013
13	Kevin Gordon	23 games, 2009
12	Anthony Don	20 games, 2017
12	Ryan James	25 games, 2016
12	Anthony Don	22 games, 2016
12	Kevin Gordon	26 games, 2010
12	Anthony Laffranchi	20 games, 2008
12	Anthony Don	16 games, 2015
Last updated: Round 12, 2022

=== Youngest players to debut ===
Player	Age	Match details
Moeaki Fotuaika	18 years, 5 months & 19 days	vs. Canberra Raiders, Canberra, Round 9, 2018
Jahrome Hughes	18 years, 8 months & 28 days	vs. Penrith Panthers, TIO Stadium, Round 17, 2013
Ryan James	18 years, 10 months & 22 days	vs. Manly-Warringah Sea Eagles, Skilled Park, Round 14, 2010
Jordan Rapana	18 years, 10 months & 26 days	vs. Sydney Roosters, Sydney Football Stadium, Round 18, 2008
Kevin Gordon	19 years, 3 months & 1 day	vs. Canterbury-Bankstown Bulldogs, Skilled Park, Round 3, 2009
Last updated: End of Round 13, 2016

=== Oldest players ===
Player	Age	Match details
Michael Gordon	35 years, 10 months & 14 days	vs. St George Illawarra Dragons, Cbus Super Stadium, Round 25, 2019
Nathan Friend	35 years, 6 months & 12 days	vs. Brisbane Broncos, Suncorp Stadoum, Finals week 1, 2016
Mat Rogers	35 years, 5 months & 7 days	vs. New Zealand Warriors, Mt Smart Stadium, Round 18, 2011
Luke Bailey	34 years, 7 months & 19 days	vs. St George Illawarra Dragons, WIN Jubilee Oval, Round 24, 2014
Preston Campbell	34 years, 2 months & 27 days	vs. Parramatta Eels, Skilled Park, Round 26, 2011
Last updated: End of Round 25, 2019

=== Player of the year (Paul Broughton Medal) ===
Year	Player
2025	AJ Brimson
2024	Keano Kini
2023	Moeaki Fotuaika
2022	Tino Fa'asuamaleaui
2021	Tino Fa'asuamaleaui
2020	Brian Kelly
2019	Moeaki Fotuaika
2018	Jai Arrow
2017	Anthony Don
2016	Ryan James
2015	Luke Douglas
2014	Beau Falloon
2013	Greg Bird
2012	Nate Myles
2011	Luke Bailey
2010	Luke Bailey
2009	Nathan Friend
2008	Preston Campbell
2007	Luke Bailey & Anthony Laffranchi

== Coaching records ==
=== Most games ===
Games	Name	First game	Last game
192	John Cartwright	Round 1, 2007	Round 22, 2014
81	Justin Holbrook	Round 1, 2020	Round 16, 2023
75	Neil Henry	Round 23, 2014	Round 24, 2017
Last updated: End of Round 16, 2023

=== Most wins ===
Wins	Name	Era
87	John Cartwright	2007–2014
30	Justin Holbrook	2020–2023
28	Neil Henry	2014–2017
Last updated: End of Round 16, 2023

=== Highest winning percentage ===
Win %	Name	Wins	Losses	Draws
45.3	John Cartwright	87	105	0
37.3	Neil Henry	28	46	1
37	Justin Holbrook	30	51	0
Last updated: End of Round 16, 2023

== Club records ==
=== Highest home game attendance ===
Crowd	Opponent	Venue	Match details
47,686	Brisbane Broncos	Suncorp Stadium	Round 5, 2007
44,787	Sydney Roosters	Suncorp Stadium	Preliminary final, 2010
42,030	St. George Illawarra Dragons	Suncorp Stadium	Round 1, 2007
27,227	Brisbane Broncos	Skilled Park	Qualifying final, 2009
27,176	Brisbane Broncos	Skilled Park	Round 6, 2008
27,026	New Zealand Warriors	Skilled Park	Qualifying final, 2010
26,974	North Queensland Cowboys	Skilled Park	Round 1, 2008
26,453	St. George Illawarra Dragons	Skilled Park	Round 16, 2008
26,336	Brisbane Broncos	Skilled Park	Round 20, 2009
26,197	Brisbane Broncos	Skilled Park	Round 19, 2010

=== Biggest wins ===
Margin	Score	Opponent	Venue	Match details
60	66-6	New Zealand Warriors	Cbus Super Stadium	Round 16, 2024
44	44-0	New Zealand Warriors	Cbus Super Stadium	Round 25, 2021
42	52-10	Parramatta Eels	CommBank Stadium	Round 6, 2026
38	42-4	Parramatta Eels	Mudgee Stadium	Round 11, 2013
38	44-6	Canberra Raiders	GIO Stadium	Round 16, 2021
36	44-8	North Queensland Cowboys	Queensland Country Bank Stadium	Round 3, 2021
36	36-0	Canberra Raiders	Skilled Park	Round 2, 2013
30	36-6	Wests Tigers	Skilled Park	Round 21, 2013
30	38-8	Canberra Raiders	Cbus Super Stadium	Round 9, 2017
28	34-6	Canterbury Bulldogs	Suncorp Stadium	Round 20, 2021
26	42-16	Newcastle Knights	Cbus Super Stadium	Round 5, 2021
26	38-12	Parramatta Eels	Carrara Stadium	Round 7, 2007
26	32-6	Penrith Panthers	Cbus Super Stadium	Round 7, 2015
22	38-16	Parramatta Eels	Pirtek Stadium	Round 6, 2015
22	34-12	Parramatta Eels	Skilled Park	Round 22, 2010
22	32-10	St George Illawarra Dragons	Cbus Super Stadium	Round 19, 2021
22	36-14	North Queensland Cowboys	Cbus Super Stadium	Round 21, 2021

=== Biggest losses (30+) ===
Margin	Score	Opponent	Venue	Match details
54	0-54	Brisbane Broncos	Cbus Super Stadium	Round 22, 2017
52	6-58	Sydney Roosters	Sydney Cricket Ground	Round 20, 2019
46	10-56	Canberra Raiders	Canberra Stadium	Round 18, 2007
46	8-54	St George Illawarra Dragons	Cbus Super Stadium	Round 3, 2018
44	6-50	Melbourne Storm	Olympic Park Stadium	Round 25, 2007
44	0-44	Cronulla Sharks	Cbus Super Stadium	Round 23, 2024
42	4-46	Canberra Raiders	Canberra Stadium	Round 20, 2008
42	0-42	New Zealand Warriors	Mt Smart Stadium	Round 25, 2014
40	4-44	Melbourne Storm	Olympic Park Stadium	Round 21, 2008
40	0-40	Penrith Panthers	Carrington Park	Round 2, 2015
40	16-56	Canberra Raiders	Canberra Stadium	Round 9, 2015
40	6-46	Parramatta Eels	Cbus Super Stadium	Round 2, 2020
38	0-38	Melbourne Storm	Cbus Super Stadium	Round 9, 2016
36	6-42	Melbourne Storm	Sunshine Coast	Round 10, 2020
36	12-48	Penrith Panthers	Suncorp Stadium	Round 10, 2021
36	0-36	Manly-Warringah Sea Eagles	Glen Willow Oval	Round 6, 2021

=== Kept opposition to nil ===
Score	Opponent	Venue	Match details
44-0	New Zealand Warriors	Cbus Super Stadium	Round 25, 2021
36-0	Canberra Raiders	Skilled Park	Round 2, 2013
18-0	Melbourne Storm	Skilled Park	Round 13, 2008
18-0	North Queensland Cowboys	Dairy Farmers Stadium	Round 1, 2012

=== Kept to nil ===
Score	Opponent	Venue	Match details
0-54	Brisbane Broncos	Robina Stadium	Round 22, 2017
0-42	New Zealand Warriors	Mt Smart Stadium	Round 25, 2014
0-40	Penrith Panthers	Carrington Park	Round 2, 2015
0-38	Melbourne Storm	Cbus Super Stadium	Round 9, 2016
0-34	Brisbane Broncos	Suncorp Stadium	Round 20, 2015
0-32	Canterbury-Bankstown Bulldogs	Belmore Sports Ground	Round 3, 2024

=== Longest winning streak ===
Wins	First win	Last win
5	Round 3, 2008	Round 7, 2008
5	Round 20, 2010	Round 24, 2010
5	Round 16, 2020	Round 20, 2020

=== Longest winning home streak ===
Wins	First win	Last win
9	Round 21, 2007	Round 13, 2008
9	Round 1, 2009	Round 21, 2009

=== Longest winning away streak ===
Wins	First win	Last win
3	Round 20, 2010	Round 24, 2010
3	Round 1, 2014	Round 5, 2014
3	Round 4, 2015	Round 8, 2015

=== Longest losing streak ===
Losses	First loss	Last loss
14	Round 13, 2019	Round 4, 2020
8	Round 15, 2011	Round 21, 2011
8	Round 9, 2014	Round 16, 2014
6	Round 20, 2014	Round 25, 2014

=== Longest losing home streak ===
Losses	First loss	Last loss
8	Round 9, 2014	Round 23, 2014

=== Longest losing away streak ===
Losses	First loss	Last loss
7	Round 17, 2007	Round 2, 2008

=== Biggest comeback ===
Recovered from an 18-point deficit.

- Trailed the Canterbury Bulldogs 18-0 after 51 minutes to win 19-18 at Cbus Super Stadium in Round 26, 2014.

Recovered from a 14-point deficit.

- Trailed the Newcastle Knights 14-0 after 31 minutes to win 34-20 at Skilled Park in Round 1, 2009.
- Trailed the Wests Tigers 14-0 after 24 minutes to win 20-14 at Skilled Park in Round 6, 2011.
- Trailed the Parramatta Eels 22-8 after 53 minutes to win 28-22 at Skilled Park in Round 6, 2013.
- Trailed the Canberra Raiders 20-6 after 64 minutes to win 24-20 at GIO Stadium in Round 4, 2016.

=== Worst collapse ===
Surrendered a 26-point lead.

- Led the Dolphins 26-0 after 28 minutes to lose 28-26 at Suncorp Stadium on 23 April 2023.

Surrendered a 14-point lead.

- Led the Wests Tigers 14-0 after 35 minutes to lose 14-15 at Robina Stadium on 5 May 2012.
- Led the Cronulla Sharks 14-0 after 37 minutes to lose 22-23 at Robina Stadium on 16 May 2015.
- Led the South Sydney Rabbitohs 14-0 after 28 minutes to lose 20-36 at ANZ Stadium on 16 June 2017.

== Golden point record (outdated) ==
Played	Won	Drawn	Lost
12	5	1	6

Opponent	Result	Score	Match details
Brisbane Broncos	Loss	18-19	Round 17, 2007
Brisbane Broncos	Loss	21-25	Round 24, 2008
South Sydney Rabbitohs	Won	19-18	Round 2, 2010
St George Illawarra Dragons	Won	11-10	Round 20, 2010
Canberra Raiders	Won	23-22	Round 4, 2011
Wests Tigers	Loss	14-15	Round 9, 2012
Melbourne Storm	Loss	22-23	Round 26, 2013
Canterbury Bulldogs	Won	19-18	Round 26, 2014
Cronulla-Sutherland Sharks	Loss	22-23	Round 10, 2015
Canterbury Bulldogs	Loss	20-21	Round 8, 2016
South Sydney Rabbitohs	Won	29-28	Round 13, 2016
Cronulla-Sutherland Sharks	Draw	18-18	Round 21, 2016

== Win–loss record (outdated) ==
Opponent	Played	Won	Drawn	Lost	Win %
Brisbane Broncos	33	10	0	23	30.3
Canberra Raiders	28	13	0	15	46.4
Canterbury-Bankstown Bulldogs	20	11	0	9	55.0
Cronulla-Sutherland Sharks	25	8	1	16	32.0
Manly-Warringah Sea Eagles	24	10	0	14	47.1
Melbourne Storm	24	6	0	18	25.0
Newcastle Knights	26	12	0	14	46.2
New Zealand Warriors	30	11	0	19	36.7
North Queensland Cowboys	29	11	0	18	37.9
Parramatta Eels	23	11	0	12	47.8
Penrith Panthers	23	7	0	16	30.4
St. George Illawarra Dragons	26	10	0	16	38.5
South Sydney Rabbitohs	21	6	0	15	28.6
Sydney Roosters	23	8	0	15	34.8
Wests Tigers	24	15	0	9	62.5
Total	379	149	1	229	39.31

== Biggest wins and losses (by opponent) (outdated) ==
Opponent	Win	Loss
Brisbane Broncos	18 (30-12: Round 7, 2020)	54 (0-54: Round 22, 2017)
Canberra Raiders	36 (36-0: Round 2, 2013)	46 (10–56: Round 18, 2007)
Canterbury Bulldogs	14 (28-14: Round 14, 2015)	24 (12-36: Round 19, 2007)
Cronulla Sharks	14 (18-4: Round 3, 2008)	24 (12-36: Round 16, 2011)
Manly Sea Eagles	20 (30-10: Round 15, 2016)	34 (4-38: Round 26, 2009)
Melbourne Storm	18 (18-0: Round 13, 2008)	44 (6-50: Round 25, 2007)
New Zealand Warriors	20 (30-10: Round 22, 2009)	42 (0-42: Round 25, 2014)
Newcastle Knights	30 (36-6: Round 20, 2020)	30 (20-50: Round 21, 2011; 16-46: Round 16, 2013)
North Queensland Cowboys	36 (44-8: Round 3, 2021)	30 (12-42: Round 26, 2015)
Parramatta Eels	38 (42-4: Round 11, 2013)	25 (2-27: Finals Week 2, 2009)
Penrith Panthers	26 (32-6: Round 7, 2015)	40 (0-40: Round 2, 2015)
St George Illawarra Dragons	20 (32-12: Round 19, 2016)	28 (6-34: Round 24, 2014)
South Sydney Rabbitohs	8 (22-14: Round 23, 2009)	28 (4-32: Round 20, 2013)
Sydney Roosters	20 (36-16: Round 21, 2012)	26 (6-58: Round 20, 2019)
Wests Tigers	30 (36-6: Round 21, 2013)	30 (12-42: Round 2, 2014)

== See also ==
https://www.rugbyleagueproject.org/teams/gold-coast-titans/records.html

- List of NRL records
