= 2008 Queensland Cup season results =

The 2008 Queensland Cup season was the 13th season of the premier rugby league competition in Queensland, Australia.

== Regular season ==
All times are in AEST (UTC+10:00) on the relevant dates.

Round 1

Home	Score	Away	Match Information
Home	Score	Away	Date and Time	Venue
Tweed Heads Seagulls	14 - 38	Redcliffe Dolphins	15 March 2008, 2:00pm	Cudgen Oval
Easts Tigers	24 - 30	Burleigh Bears	15 March 2008, 3:00pm	Langlands Park
Ipswich Jets	34 - 24	Wynnum Manly Seagulls	15 March 2008, 3:00pm	Briggs Road Complex
Northern Pride	44 - 16	Mackay Cutters	15 March 2008, 6:00pm	Barlow Park
Central Comets	28 - 18	Norths Devils	15 March 2008, 7:30pm	Browne Park
Bye Souths Logan Magpies

Round 2

Home	Score	Away	Match Information
Home	Score	Away	Date and Time	Venue
Wynnum Manly Seagulls	18 - 10	Mackay Cutters	22 March 2008, 2:00pm	BMD Kougari Oval
Easts Tigers	16 - 32	Souths Logan Magpies	22 March 2008, 3:00pm	Langlands Park
Burleigh Bears	40 - 10	Central Comets	22 March 2008, 6:00pm	Pizzey Park
Redcliffe Dolphins	18 - 32	Northern Pride	23 March 2008, 2:00pm	Dolphin Oval
Norths Devils	20 - 12	Tweed Heads	23 March 2008, 3:00pm	Bishop Park
Bye Ipswich Jets

Round 3

Home	Score	Away	Match Information
Home	Score	Away	Date and Time	Venue
Tweed Heads	26 - 28	Burleigh Bears	29 March 2008, 2:00pm	Cudgen Oval
Northern Pride	46 - 12	Norths Devils	29 March 2008, 6:00pm	Langlands Park
Mackay Cutters	4 - 16	Ipswich Jets	29 March 2008, 7:00pm	Mackay Junior Fields
Central Comets	6 - 20	Souths Logan Magpies	30 March 2008, 7:30pm	Browne Park
Redcliffe Dolphins	26 - 26	Wynnum Manly Seagulls	30 March 2008, 3:00pm	Dolphin Oval
Bye Easts Tigers

Round 4

Home	Score	Away	Match Information
Home	Score	Away	Date and Time	Venue
Easts Tigers	40 - 4	Central Comets	5 April 2008, 2:00pm	Langlands Park
Ipswich Jets	24 - 0	Redcliffe Dolphins	5 April 2008, 3:00pm	Briggs Road Complex
Burleigh Bears	8 - 18	Northern Pride	5 April 2008, 6:30pm	Pizzey Park
Wynnum Manly Seagulls	26 - 14	Norths Devils	6 April 2008, 3:00pm	BMD Kougari Oval
Tweed Heads	20 - 38	Souths Logan Magpies	6 April 2008, 3:00pm	Cudgen Oval
Bye Mackay Cutters

Round 5

Home	Score	Away	Match Information
Home	Score	Away	Date and Time	Venue
Souths Logan Magpies	24 - 34	Northern Pride	12 April 2008, 2:00pm	Meakin Park
Easts Tigers	34 - 6	Tweed Heads	12 April 2008, 3:00pm	Langlands Park
Redcliffe Dolphins	22 - 24	Mackay Cutters	13 April 2008 2:00pm	Pizzey Park
Wynnum Manly Seagulls	24 - 40	Burleigh Bears	13 April 2008, 3:00pm	BMD Kougari Oval
Norths Devils	10 - 60	Ipswich Jets	13 April 2008, 3:00pm	Bishop Park
Bye Central Comets

Round 6

Home	Score	Away	Match Information
Home	Score	Away	Date and Time	Venue
Burleigh Bears	20 - 28	Ipswich Jets	19 April 2008, 2:00pm	Pizzey Park
Northern Pride	30 - 28	Easts Tigers	19 April 2008, 6:00pm	Barlow Park
Mackay Cutters	14 - 22	Norths Devils	19 April 2008 7:00pm	Mackay Junior Fields
Central Comets	34 - 32	Tweed Heads	19 April 2008, 7:30pm	Browne Park
Souths Logan Magpies	40 - 24	Wynnum Manly Seagulls	20 April 2008, 3:00pm	Davies Park
Bye Redcliffe Dolphins

Round 7

Home	Score	Away	Match Information
Home	Score	Away	Date and Time	Venue
Norths Devils	10 - 44	Redcliffe Dolphins	26 April 2008, 2:00pm	Bishop Park
Ipswich Jets	18 - 20	Souths Logan Magpies	26 April 2008, 3:00pm	Briggs Road Complex
Northern Pride	40 - 10	Central Comets	26 April 2008 6:00pm	Barlow Park
Burleigh Bears	10 - 32	Mackay Cutters	26 April 2008, 6:30pm	Pizzey Park
Wynnum Manly Seagulls	22 - 22	Easts Tigers	27 April 2008, 3:00pm	BMD Kougari Oval
Bye Tweed Heads

Round 8

Home	Score	Away	Match Information
Home	Score	Away	Date and Time	Venue
Easts Tigers	14 - 36	Ipswich Jets	3 May 2008, 3:00pm	Langlands Park
Tweed Heads	34 - 4	Northern Pride	3 May 2008, 6:00pm	Cudgen Oval
Mackay Cutters	22 - 12	Souths Logan Magpies	3 May 2008 7:00pm	Mackay Junior Fields
Central Comets	24 - 34	Wynnum Manly Seagulls	3 May 2008, 7:30pm	Browne Park
Redcliffe Dolphins	62 - 28	Burleigh Bears	4 May 2008, 3:00pm	Dolphin Oval
Bye Norths Devils

Round 9

Home	Score	Away	Match Information
Home	Score	Away	Date and Time	Venue
Mackay Cutters	20 - 40	Easts Tigers	10 May 2008, 7:00pm	Mackay Junior Fields
Ipswich Jets	54 - 16	Central Comets	10 May 2008, 7:30pm	Briggs Road Complex
Wynnum Manly Seagulls	14 - 64	Tweed Heads	11 May 2008 3:00pm	BMD Kougari Oval
Burleigh Bears	22 - 14	Norths Devils	11 May 2008, 3:00pm	Pizzey Park
Souths Logan Magpies	26 - 6	Redcliffe Dolphins	11 May 2008, 3:00pm	Davies Park
Bye Northern Pride

Round 10

Home	Score	Away	Match Information
Home	Score	Away	Date and Time	Venue
Northern Pride	16 - 26	Wynnum Manly Seagulls	17 May 2008, 6:00pm	Barlow Park
Mackay Cutters	12 - 18	Central Comets	17 May 2008, 7:00pm	Mackay Junior Fields
Tweed Heads	25 - 24	Ipswich Jets	18 May 2008 3:00pm	Cudgen Oval
Redcliffe Dolphins	6- 4	Easts Tigers	18 May 2008, 3:00pm	Dolphin Oval
Norths Devils	8 - 46	Souths Logan Magpies	18 May 2008, 3:00pm	Bishop Park
Bye Burleigh Bears

Round 11

Home	Score	Away	Match Information
Home	Score	Away	Date and Time	Venue
Easts Tigers	30 - 16	Norths Devils	24 May 2008, 3:00pm	Langlands Park
Souths Logan Magpies	44 - 12	Burleigh Bears	24 May 2008, 3:00pm	Davies Park
Tweed Heads	26 - 26	Mackay Cutters	24 May 2008 4:30pm	Cudgen Oval
Ipswich Jets	16 - 30	Northern Pride	24 May 2008, 6:30pm	Briggs Road Complex
Central Comets	28 - 26	Redcliffe Dolphins	24 May 2008, 7:30pm	Browne Park
Bye Wynnum Manly Seagulls

Round 12

Home	Score	Away	Match Information
Home	Score	Away	Date and Time	Venue
Wynnum Manly Seagulls	4 - 24	Ipswich Jets	7 June 2008, 2:00pm	BMD Kougari Oval
Mackay Cutters	12 - 18	Northern Pride	7 June 2008, 7:00pm	Mackay Junior Fields
Burleigh Bears	4 - 26	Easts Tigers	8 June 2008, 1:00pm	Pizzey Park
Redcliffe Dolphins	26 - 10	Tweed Heads	8 June 2008, 2:00pm	Dolphin Oval
Norths Devils	18 - 40	Central Comets	8 June 2008, 2:30pm	Bishop Park
Bye Souths Logan Magpies

Round 13

Home	Score	Away	Match Information
Home	Score	Away	Date and Time	Venue
Souths Logan Magpies	34 - 14	Easts Tigers	14 June 2008, 2:00pm	Meakin Park
Tweed Heads	30 - 18	Norths Devils	14 June 2008, 3:00pm	Cudgen Oval
Northern Pride	0 - 26	Redcliffe Dolphins	14 June 2008, 6:00pm	Barlow Park
Mackay Cutters	30 - 36	Wynnum Manly Seagulls	14 June 2008, 7:00pm	Mackya Junior Fields
Central Comets	22 - 29	Burleigh Bears	14 June 2008, 7:30pm	Browne Park
Bye Ipswich Jets

Round 14

Home	Score	Away	Match Information
Home	Score	Away	Date and Time	Venue
Ipswich Jets		Mackay Cutters	21 June 2008, 2:00pm	Briggs Road Complex
Souths Logan Magpies		Central Comets	21 June 2008, 2:30pm	Meakin Park
Norths Devils		Northern Pride	22 June 2008, 2:00pm	Bishop Park
Wynnum Manly Seagulls		Redcliffe Dolphins	22 June 2008, 3:00pm	BMD Kougari Oval
Burleigh Bears		Tweed Heads	22 June 2008, 3:00pm	Pizzey Park
Bye Easts Tigers

Round 15

Home	Score	Away	Match Information
Home	Score	Away	Date and Time	Venue
Souths Logan Magpies		Tweed Heads	28 June 2008, 2:00pm	Meakin Park
Northern Pride		Burleigh Bears	28 June 2008, 6:00pm	Barlow Park
Central Comets		Easts Tigers	28 June 2008, 7:30pm	Browne Park
Norths Devils		Wynnum Manly Seagulls	29 June 2008, 3:00pm	Bishop Park
Redcliffe Dolphins		Ipswich Jets	29 June 2008, 3:00pm	Dolphin Oval
Bye Mackay Cutters

Round 16

Home	Score	Away	Match Information
Home	Score	Away	Date and Time	Venue
Burleigh Bears	32 - 12	Wynnum Manly Seagulls	5 July 2008, 2:00pm	Pizzey Park
Ipswich Jets	20 - 12	Norths Devils	5 July 2008, 3:00pm	Briggs Road Complex
Northern Pride	16 - 12	Souths Logan Magpies	5 July 2008, 6:00pm	Browne Park
Mackay Cutters	10 - 18	Redcliffe Dolphins	5 July 2008, 7:00pm	Mackay Junior Fields
Tweed Heads	32 - 12	Easts Tigers	6 July 2008, 3:00pm	Cudgen Oval
Bye Central Comets

Round 17

Home	Score	Away	Match Information
Home	Score	Away	Date and Time	Venue
Easts Tigers	10 - 26	Northern Pride	12 July 2008, 2:00pm	Langlands Park
Ipswich Jets	22 - 36	Burleigh Bears	12 July 2008, 2:00pm	Briggs Road Complex
Tweed Heads	20 - 22	Central Comets	12 July 2008, 6:00pm	Cudgen Oval
Norths Devils	24 - 40	Mackay Cutters	13 July 2008, 2:00pm	Bishop Park
Wynnum Manly Seagulls	34 - 20	Souths Logan Magpies	13 July 2008, 3:00pm	BMD Kougari Oval
Bye Redcliffe Dolphins

Round 18

Home	Score	Away	Match Information
Home	Score	Away	Date and Time	Venue
Souths Logan Magpies	16 - 28	Ipswich Jets	19 July 2008, 2:00pm	Brandon Park
Mackay Cutters	16 - 22	Burleigh Bears	19 July 2008, 7:00pm	Mackay Junior Fields
Central Comets	28 - 16	Northern Pride	19 July 2008, 7:30pm	Browne Park
Redcliffe Dolphins	28 - 8	Norths Devils	20 July 2008, 3:00pm	Dolphin Oval
Easts Tigers	20 - 42	Wynnum Manly Seagulls	20 July 2008, 3:00pm	Langlands Park
Bye Tweed Heads

Round 19

Home	Score	Away	Match Information
Home	Score	Away	Date and Time	Venue
Ipswich Jets	38 - 22	Easts Tigers	26 July 2008, 2:00pm	Briggs Road Complex
Wynnum Manly Seagulls	24 - 12	Central Comets	26 July 2008, 2:00pm	BMD Kougari Oval
Souths Logan Magpies	26 - 22	Mackay Cutters	26 July 2008, 2:00pm	Meakin Park
Northern Pride	20 - 34	Tweed Heads	26 July 2008, 6:00pm	Barlow Park
Burleigh Bears	24 - 30	Redcliffe Dolphins	27 July 2008, 3:00pm	Pizzey Park
Bye Norths Devils

Round 20

Home	Score	Away	Match Information
Home	Score	Away	Date and Time	Venue
Redcliffe Dolphins	22 - 16	Souths Logan Magpies	2 August 2008, 2:00pm	Dolphin Oval
Easts Tigers	22 - 26	Mackay Cutters	2 August 2008, 2:00pm	Langlands Park
Central Comets	16 - 38	Ipswich Jets	2 August 2008, 7:30pm	Browne Park
Norths Devils	12 - 62	Burleigh Bears	3 August 2008, 3:00pm	Bishop Park
Tweed Heads	46 - 22	Wynnum Manly Seagulls	3 August 2008, 3:00pm	Cudgen Oval
Bye Northern Pride

Round 21

Home	Score	Away	Match Information
Home	Score	Away	Date and Time	Venue
Ipswich Jets	62 - 10	Tweed Heads	9 August 2008, 2:00pm	Briggs Road Complex
Easts Tigers	32 - 26	Redcliffe Dolphins	9 August 2008, 3:00pm	Langlands Park
Central Comets	22 - 46	Mackay Cutters	9 August 2008, 7:30pm	Browne Park
Wynnum Manly Seagulls	36 - 16	Northern Pride	10 August 2008, 2:00pm	BMD Kougari Oval
Souths Logan Magpies	78 - 8	Norths Devils	10 August 2008, 3:00pm	Davies Park
Bye Burleigh Bears

Round 22

Home	Score	Away	Match Information
Home	Score	Away	Date and Time	Venue
Redcliffe Dolphins	32 - 22	Central Comets	16 August 2008, 2:00pm	Dolphin Oval
Northern Pride	20 - 30	Ipswich Jets	16 August 2008, 6:00pm	Barlow Park
Mackay Cutters	28 - 24	Tweed Heads	16 August 2008 7:00pm	Mackay Junior Fields
Burleigh Bears	26 - 32	Souths Logan Magpies	17 August 2008, 3:00pm	Pizzey Park
Norths Devils	14 - 22	Easts Tigers	17 August 2008, 3:00pm	Bishop Park
Bye Wynnum Manly Seagulls
