= David Mead (rugby league) =

Papua New Guinea international rugby league footballer

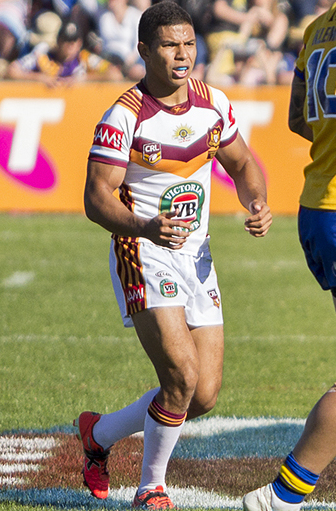

Personal information
- Full name: David Mead
- Born: David Moore; 4 November 1988 (age 38) Port Moresby, Papua New Guinea

Playing information
- Height: 183 cm (6 ft 0 in)
- Weight: 90 kg (14 st 2 lb)
- Position: Wing, Fullback, Centre
Club
Years	Team	Pld	T	G	FG	P
2009–16	Gold Coast Titans	147	67	0	0	268
2017	Brisbane Broncos	13	3	0	0	12
2018–20	Catalans Dragons	58	29	0	0	116
2021–22	Brisbane Broncos	12	5	0	0	20
	Total	230	104	0	0	416
Representative
Years	Team	Pld	T	G	FG	P
2008–22	Papua New Guinea	15	10	3	0	46
2011	PNG Prime Minister's XIII	1	0	0	0	0
2014–15	Country NSW	2	3	0	0	12

David Mead (born David Moore on 4 November 1988) is a Papua New Guinean former professional rugby league footballer who last played as a winger, centre or fullback for the Brisbane Broncos in the National Rugby League (NRL) and Papua New Guinea at international level.

Mead previously played for the Gold Coast Titans and the Broncos in the NRL, and the Catalans Dragons in the Super League. He is a New South Wales Country Origin and World All Stars representative, he represented Papua New Guinea at the 2008, 2013 World Cups and was the PNG Kumuls' captain for the 2017 World Cup.

== Background ==
He was born in Port Moresby, Papua New Guinea as David Moore on 4 November 1988, and moved to Australia as a 12-year-old where he attended Kadina High School and Trinity Catholic College in Lismore, New South Wales.

As a junior rugby league footballer, he played for Lismore Marist Brothers before being signed by the Gold Coast Titans, and playing in their NYC team in 2008. He later changed his surname to Mead to honour his aunt's family who had raised him when he moved to Australia.

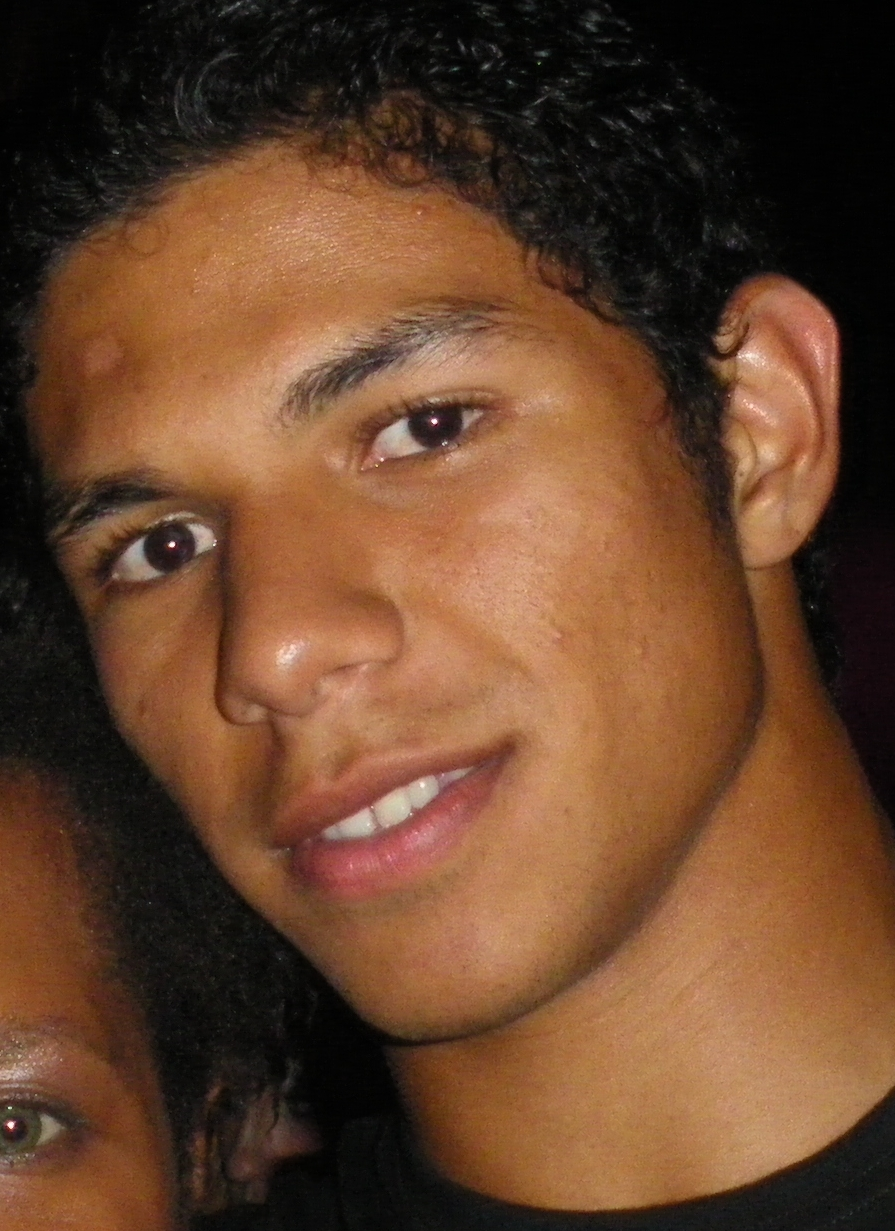
Mead as David Moore in 2008

== Playing career ==
=== 2008 ===
He was named in the Papua New Guinea squad for the 2008 Rugby League World Cup and between the 2008 World Cup and the 2009 NRL season he changed his surname from Moore to Mead.

=== 2009 ===
On 30 January 2009, Mead signed a contract extension with the Gold Coast after turning down an offer from the Sydney Roosters. In round 13 of the 2009 NRL season, Mead made his NRL debut for the Gold Coast against the St. George Illawarra Dragons off the interchange bench in a 28–24 win at Skilled Park. In his next appearance in round 16 against the New Zealand Warriors, Mead made his first appearance in the starting line-up, scoring his first and second NRL career tries in the 28–12 win at Skilled Park. Mead finished his debut year in the NRL with 14 matches and 8 tries. He was part of the Papua New Guinea squad for the 2009 Pacific Cup, and was named their player of the year by the Rugby League International Federation.

=== 2010 ===
A regular on the wing in 2010, Mead was one of the club's leaders in many statistics before a foot injury saw him miss the rest of the season from round 16 onwards. Mead said, "It is pretty frustrating because I have worked so hard and to get halfway through the year now and it is all just gone, just like that." In Round 12 against the Sydney Roosters, Mead scored a hat trick of tries in the Titans 30–16 loss. Mead played in 15 matches and scored 6 tries during 2010.

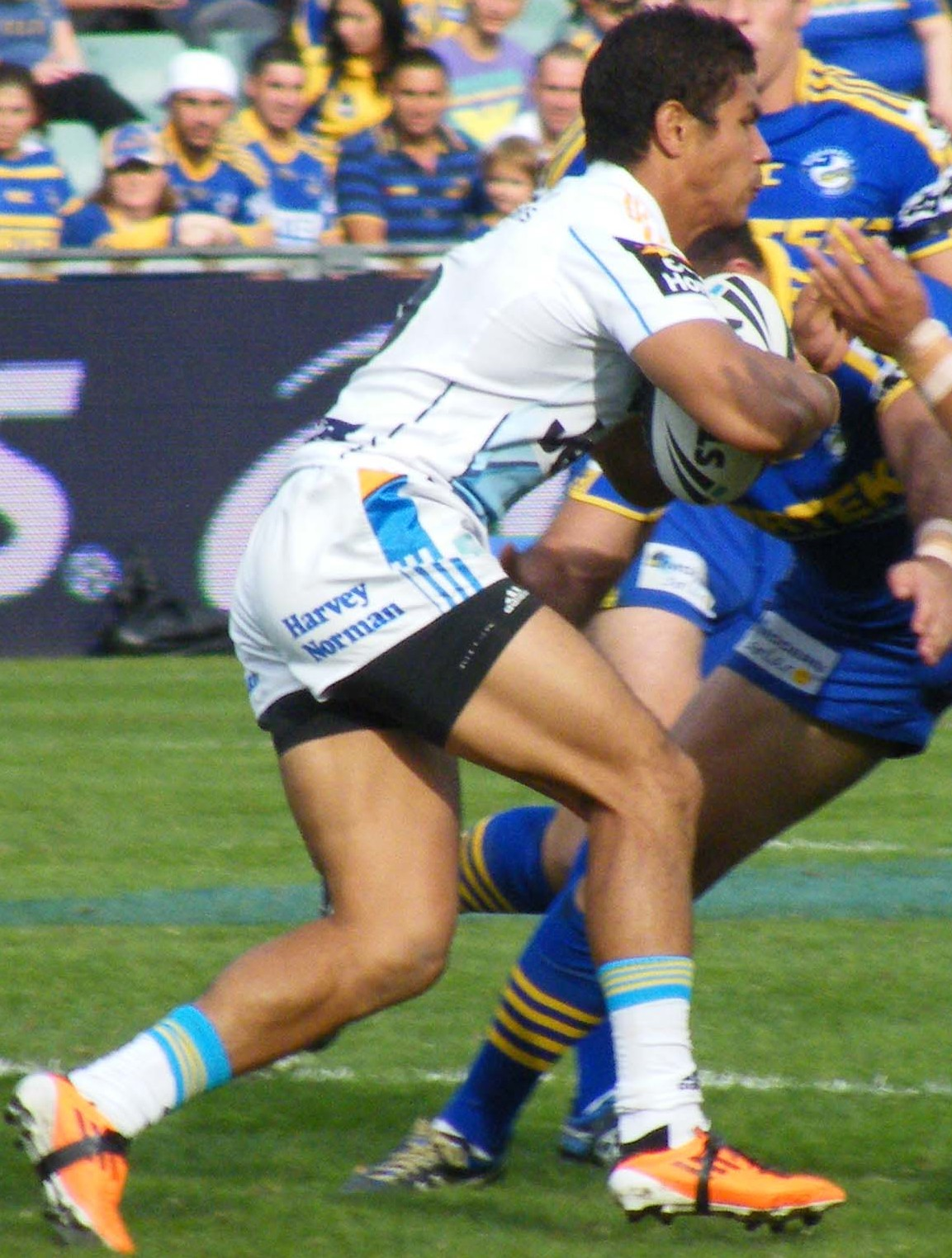
Mead playing for the Gold Coast Titans in 2011

=== 2011 ===
Despite the Titans poor record in 2011 where they finished with the Wooden Spoon, Mead played in every match and was the club's top tryscorer with 16 tries from 24 appearances. In round 22 against the Cronulla-Sutherland Sharks, Mead scored what some considered the best try of the year when he collected a Scott Prince cross-over kick on the fly behind his back one handed to score in the 20–16 win at Toyota Stadium. Assistant coach Steve Murphy said, "I can't believe he caught that ball. It was just one of those freak things, those amazing things. He's got those in him, Dave."

=== 2012 ===
Mead played in 20 matches and scored 10 tries for the Titans in the 2012 NRL season. On 6 December 2012, Mead extended his contract with the Gold Coast for 4 years till the end of the 2016 season.

=== 2013 ===
In round 23 against the North Queensland Cowboys, Mead became the first Gold Coast Titans player to score 50 tries for the club during their 22–10 loss at 1300SMILES Stadium. Mead played in 16 matches and scored 11 tries in 2013. In October, Mead represented Papua New Guinea in the 2013 Rugby League World Cup, playing in all 3 matches at fullback.

=== 2014 ===
In January, Mead was selected for the Titans inaugural 2014 Auckland Nines squad. Mead was selected for the Country Origin team in the annual City vs Country Origin match after sorting out his eligibility for New South Wales. Mead played at fullback and scored 2 tries in the 26–26 all draw in Dubbo. In round 11 against the New Zealand Warriors, Mead played his 100th NRL career match in the 24–16 loss at Cbus Super Stadium. Mead finished the 2014 NRL season with him playing 18 matches and scoring 4 tries, his worst try-scoring effort to date.

=== 2015 ===
Mead was again a member of the Titans' Auckland Nines squad. He also returned for New South Wales Country, playing at fullback and scoring a try in their 34–22 win at Wagga Wagga. In round 25 against the St. George Illawarra Dragons, Mead eclipsed Kevin Gordon's record as the Gold Coast Titans all-time highest try-scorer with 60 tries, overtaking Gordon's 58 tries for the club by scoring 2 tries in the Gold Coast's 28–26 win at Cbus Super Stadium. He scored 5 tries from 22 matches for the 2015 NRL season.

=== 2016 ===
On 29 January 2016, Mead was named in the Titans 2016 Auckland Nines squad. On 7 May 2015, Mead captained Papua New Guinea in the 2016 Melanesian Cup Test against Fiji, where he played at fullback in the 24–22 win at Parramatta Stadium. On 10 September 2016, it was announced that Mead would sign with the Brisbane Broncos from 2017 on a one-year deal. Mead finished his last year with the Gold Coast Titans with him playing in 18 matches and scoring 7 tries in the 2016 NRL season. On 14 December 2016, Mead was named in the World All Stars team on the wing to play against the Indigenous All Stars on 10 February 2017.

=== 2017 ===
On 10 February 2017, Mead played for the World All Stars against the Indigenous All Stars in the 2017 All Stars match, playing at fullback and scoring a try in the 34–8 loss at Hunter Stadium. On 18 February 2017, Mead made his Broncos debut in the 2017 World Club Series match against the Warrington Wolves where he started on the wing and scored a try in the 27–18 loss at Halliwell Jones Stadium. At the start of the 2017 season, Mead was languishing in the Queensland Cup playing for the Wynnum-Manly Seagulls after coach Wayne Bennett opted to shift Jordan Kahu to the wing and put Broncos new recruit Tautau Moga at centre leaving Mead out of the starting backline. In Round 6 of the 2017 NRL season, Mead made his first appearance in the NRL for the Brisbane Broncos against the Sydney Roosters, filling in for an injured Corey Oates on the wing and scoring a try in the 32–8 win at Suncorp Stadium. On 21 April 2017, Mead extended his contract with Brisbane to the end of the 2018 season and also on the same day in round 8 against the South Sydney Rabbitohs, Mead played his 150th NRL career match in Brisbane's 25–24 win at ANZ Stadium. Mead finished his year stint at the Brisbane Broncos with him playing in 12 matches and scoring 3 tries in the 2017 NRL season. On 4 October 2017, Mead was named as the Captain of the Papua New Guinea 24-man squad for the 2017 Rugby League World Cup. Mead played in all 4 matches at fullback and scoring 4 tries for the Kumuls, having a great tournament by starting with scoring a hattrick of tries in the 50–6 demolishing victory over Wales in Port Moresby. On 12 December 2017, Mead announced that he had signed a 3-year deal with the Catalans Dragons in the Super League, starting in 2018.

=== 2018 ===
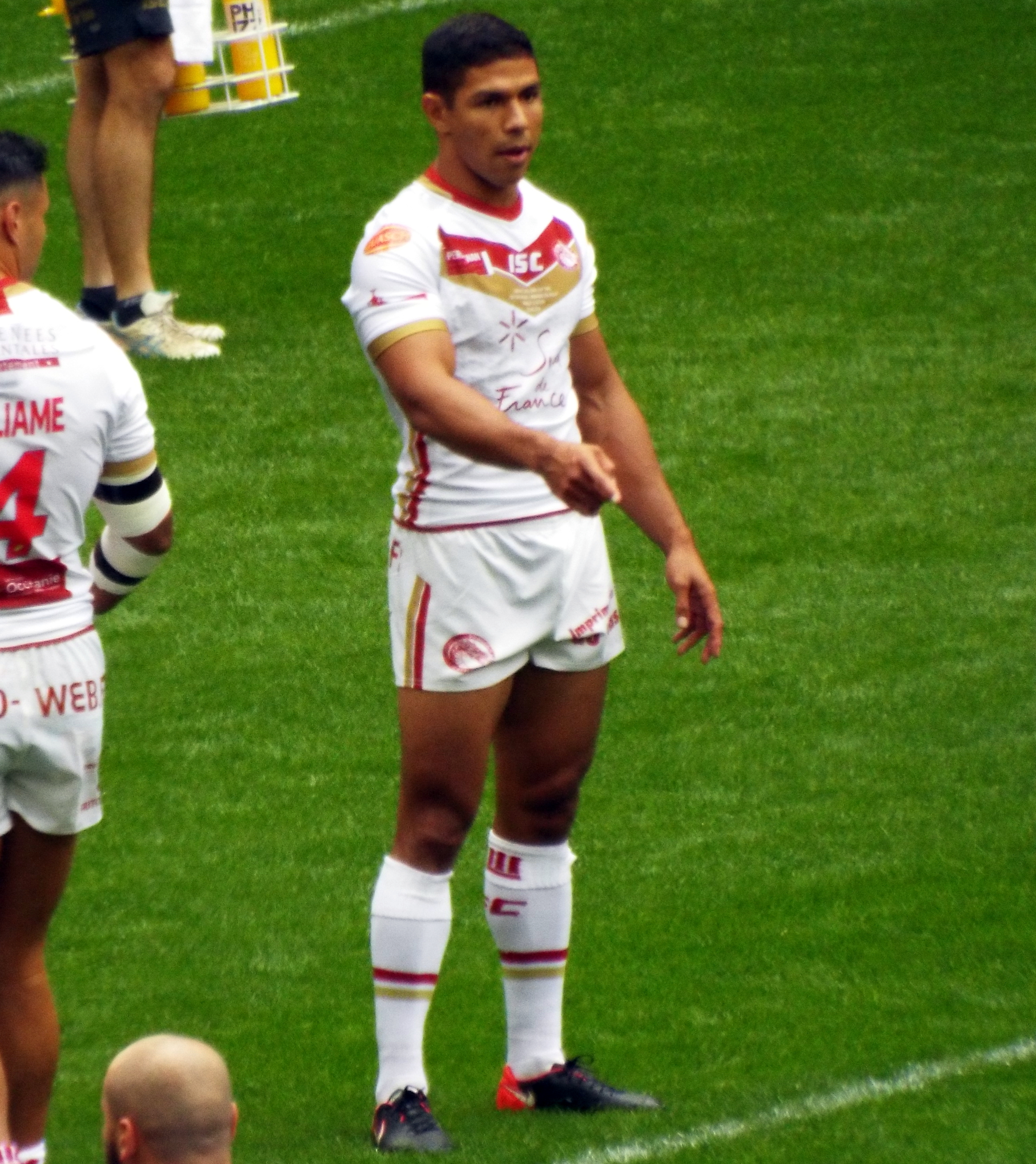
Mead warming up for the Catalans Dragons at Wembley in 2018

He played in the 2018 Challenge Cup Final victory over the Warrington Wolves at Wembley Stadium.

=== 2019 ===
Mead played a total of 17 games for Les Catalans in the Super League XXIV season as the club finished 7th on the table and missed out on the finals.

=== 2020 ===
Mead played 7 games for the Catalans Dragons in the 2020 Super League season including the club's 48–2 semi-final defeat against St Helens.

=== 2021 ===
On 13 January, Mead signed for the Brisbane Broncos. In round 1 of the 2021 NRL season, he scored a try in his return game to the NRL but Brisbane lost the match 24–16 against Parramatta.

In round 11 against the Sydney Roosters, Mead scored a hat-trick in Brisbane's 34–16 victory.

=== Statistics ===
Season	Team	Pld	T	G	FG	Pts
2009	Gold Coast Titans	14	8	0	0	32
2010	Gold Coast Titans	15	6	0	0	24
2011	Gold Coast Titans	24	16	0	0	64
2012	Gold Coast Titans	20	10	0	0	40
2013	Gold Coast Titans	16	11	0	0	44
2014	Gold Coast Titans	18	4	0	0	16
2015	Gold Coast Titans	22	5	0	0	20
2016	Gold Coast Titans	18	7	0	0	28
2017	Brisbane Broncos	13	4	0	0	16
2018	Catalans Dragons	31	15	0	0	60
2019	Catalans Dragons	19	6			24
2020	Catalans Dragons	8	7			28
2021	Brisbane Broncos	12	5			10
2022	Brisbane Broncos	0				
	Totals	230	104	0	0	416

(* denotes season still competing)

=== Honours ===
Debut
Papua New Guinea Kumuls
PNG Test Debut – 25 October 2008
Gold Coast Titans
First Grade Debut – 8 June 2009

Awards
Preceded by Award Introduced	Gold Coast Titans "The Preston"; 2012	Succeeded by William Zillman
Records
Gold Coast Titans; Most Tries (60)
Gold Coast Titans; Most Tries in a Season (16)
