= 2021 NRL season results =

Australian rugby league season

The 2021 NRL season was the 114th of professional rugby league in Australia and the 24th season run by the National Rugby League.

== Regular season ==
All times are in AEDT (UTC+11:00) up until the 4th of April and AEST (UTC+10:00) from then on.

=== Round 1 ===
Home	Score	Away	Match information			
Home	Score	Away	Date and time	Venue	Referees	Attendance
Melbourne Storm	26 – 18	South Sydney Rabbitohs	Thursday, 11 March, 8:05 pm	AAMI Park	Grant Atkins	11,812
Newcastle Knights	32 – 16	Canterbury-Bankstown Bulldogs	Friday, 12 March, 6:00 pm	McDonald Jones Stadium	Ben Cummins	19,555
Brisbane Broncos	16 – 24	Parramatta Eels	Friday, 12 March, 8:05 pm	Suncorp Stadium	Adam Gee	28,313
New Zealand Warriors	19 – 6	Gold Coast Titans	Saturday, 13 March, 3:00 pm	Central Coast Stadium	Ashley Klein	3,711
Sydney Roosters	46 – 4	Manly Warringah Sea Eagles	Saturday, 13 March, 5:30 pm	Sydney Cricket Ground	Chris Sutton	15,097
Penrith Panthers	24 – 0	North Queensland Cowboys	Saturday, 13 March, 7:35 pm	Panthers Stadium	Matt Cecchin	14,077
Canberra Raiders	30 – 12	Wests Tigers	Sunday, 14 March, 4:05 pm	GIO Stadium	Gerard Sutton	15,680
St. George Illawarra Dragons	18 – 32	Cronulla-Sutherland Sharks	Sunday, 14 March, 6:15 pm	Netstrata Jubilee Stadium	Peter Gough	7,636

- Cronulla won their first Round 1 game since 2013.
- The Roosters winning margin is the biggest win in a Round 1 game since 2002.

=== Round 2 ===
Home	Score	Away	Match information			
Home	Score	Away	Date and time	Venue	Referees	Attendance
Parramatta Eels	16 – 12	Melbourne Storm	Thursday, 18 March, 8:05 pm	Bankwest Stadium	Ashley Klein	10,416
New Zealand Warriors	16 – 20	Newcastle Knights	Friday, 19 March, 6:00 pm	Central Coast Stadium	Grant Atkins	4,551
Gold Coast Titans	28 – 16	Brisbane Broncos	Friday, 19 March, 8:05 pm	Cbus Super Stadium	Matt Cecchin	17,822
Canterbury-Bankstown Bulldogs	0 – 28	Penrith Panthers	Saturday, 20 March, 3:00 pm	Bankwest Stadium	Peter Gough	5,062
Manly Warringah Sea Eagles	12 – 26	South Sydney Rabbitohs	Saturday, 20 March, 5:30 pm	Lottoland	Gerard Sutton	3,218
North Queensland Cowboys	18 – 25	St. George Illawarra Dragons	Saturday, 20 March, 7:35 pm	Queensland Country Bank Stadium	Ben Cummins	15,120
Wests Tigers	6 – 40	Sydney Roosters	Sunday, 21 March, 4:05 pm	Campbelltown Stadium	Adam Gee	6,107
Cronulla-Sutherland Sharks	10 – 12	Canberra Raiders	Sunday, 21 March, 6:15 pm	Netstrata Jubilee Stadium	Chris Sutton	3,145

- Penrith became the first NRL side ever to hold teams to 0 points in the first 2 rounds in a season.
- Heavy rain and flooding impacted attendances at games held in Sydney and Gosford.

=== Round 3 ===
Home	Score	Away	Match information			
Home	Score	Away	Date and time	Venue	Referees	Attendance
Penrith Panthers	12 – 10	Melbourne Storm	Thursday, 25 March, 8:05 pm	BlueBet Stadium	Grant Atkins	14,077
St. George Illawarra Dragons	38 – 12	Manly Warringah Sea Eagles	Friday, 26 March, 6:00 pm	WIN Stadium	Chris Sutton	9,253
South Sydney Rabbitohs	26 – 16	Sydney Roosters	Friday, 26 March, 8:05 pm	Stadium Australia	Ashley Klein	22,838
Canberra Raiders	31 – 34	New Zealand Warriors	Saturday, 27 March, 3:00 pm	GIO Stadium	Henry Perenara	13,456
Brisbane Broncos	24 – 0	Canterbury-Bankstown Bulldogs	Saturday, 27 March, 5:30 pm	Suncorp Stadium	Ben Cummins	22,509
Parramatta Eels	28 – 4	Cronulla-Sutherland Sharks	Saturday, 27 March, 7:35 pm	Bankwest Stadium	Adam Gee	19,236
Newcastle Knights	20 – 24	Wests Tigers	Sunday, 28 March, 4:05 pm	McDonald Jones Stadium	Gerard Sutton	20,239
North Queensland Cowboys	8 – 44	Gold Coast Titans	Sunday, 28 March, 6:15 pm	Queensland Country Bank Stadium	Peter Gough	12,627

- The Brisbane Broncos ended their 13-game losing streak in their win against Canterbury.
- The Gold Coast Titans recorded their largest ever score. In the same game, North Queensland suffered their biggest home defeat since Round 14, 2007.
- New Zealand recorded their biggest ever comeback after trailing Canberra 31–10 at the 48 minute mark.

=== Round 4 ===
Home	Score	Away	Match information			
Home	Score	Away	Date and time	Venue	Referees	Attendance
Manly Warringah Sea Eagles	6 – 46	Penrith Panthers	Thursday, 1 April, 8:05 pm	Lottoland	Matt Cecchin	6,017
Canterbury-Bankstown Bulldogs	0 – 38	South Sydney Rabbitohs	Friday, 2 April, 4:05 pm	Stadium Australia	Grant Atkins	23,340
Melbourne Storm	40 – 6	Brisbane Broncos	Friday, 2 April, 8:05 pm	AAMI Park	Gerard Sutton	14,135
Cronulla-Sutherland Sharks	48 – 10	North Queensland Cowboys	Saturday, 3 April, 5:15 pm	Netstrata Jubilee Stadium	Chris Sutton	5,119
Gold Coast Titans	4 – 20	Canberra Raiders	Saturday, 3 April, 7:45 pm	Netstrata Jubilee Stadium	Adam Gee	5,117
Newcastle Knights	13 – 22	St. George Illawarra Dragons	Sunday, 4 April, 4:05 pm	McDonald Jones Stadium	Peter Gough	21,770
Sydney Roosters	32 – 12	New Zealand Warriors	Sunday, 4 April, 6:15 pm	Sydney Cricket Ground	Ben Cummins	12,210
Wests Tigers	22 – 36	Parramatta Eels	Monday, 5 April, 4:00 pm	Stadium Australia	Ashley Klein	29,056

- Penrith tied the NRL record for the longest away winning streak.
- Manly suffered their biggest ever loss at Brookvale Oval, surpassing a 39–0 loss to St George in Round 6, 1963.
- Canterbury became just the second side in NRL history (alongside Cronulla in 2014) to fail to score a point in three consecutive matches. They also lost their first four games to start the season for the first time since 1971.
- The Cronulla vs North Queensland and Gold Coast vs Canberra games were both moved to Netstrata Jubilee Stadium from the Sunshine Coast Stadium and Cbus Super Stadium respectively, due to COVID concerns in South East Queensland. In addition, the starting times of both games were altered.
- Cronulla's 48 Points against the Cowboys was their most of all time against the Cowboys.

=== Round 5 ===
Home	Score	Away	Match information			
Home	Score	Away	Date and time	Venue	Referees	Attendance
South Sydney Rabbitohs	35 – 6	Brisbane Broncos	Thursday, 8 April, 7:50 pm	Stadium Australia	Ben Cummins	9,142
New Zealand Warriors	12 – 13	Manly Warringah Sea Eagles	Friday, 9 April, 6:00 pm	Central Coast Stadium	Chris Butler	4,982
Penrith Panthers	30 – 10	Canberra Raiders	Friday, 9 April, 7:55 pm	BlueBet Stadium	Gerard Sutton	20,890
Gold Coast Titans	42 – 16	Newcastle Knights	Saturday, 10 April, 3:00 pm	Cbus Super Stadium	Ashley Klein	12,492
Canterbury-Bankstown Bulldogs	18 – 52	Melbourne Storm	Saturday, 10 April, 5:30 pm	Stadium Australia	Chris Sutton	5,104
Sydney Roosters	26 – 18	Cronulla-Sutherland Sharks	Saturday, 10 April, 7:35 pm	Sydney Cricket Ground	Adam Gee	10,739
Wests Tigers	30 – 34	North Queensland Cowboys	Sunday, 11 April, 4:05 pm	Leichhardt Oval	Matt Cecchin	9,433
Parramatta Eels	12 – 26	St. George Illawarra Dragons	Sunday, 11 April, 6:15 pm	Bankwest Stadium	Grant Atkins	24,384

- A moments silence was held prior to all matches in this round as a tribute to Tommy Raudonikis, who died a day before the first game of the round.
- South Sydney's 143 points scored in the first 5 rounds is their most all-time.
- Penrith's 5 wins from 5 is the best start to a season in club history.
- Penrith became the first team in NRL history to win 20 straight regular season games.
- Canterbury recorded their worst start to a season since 1964.
- John Morris coached his last game for the Cronulla Sharks after not being offered an extended contract.

=== Round 6 ===
Home	Score	Away	Match information			
Home	Score	Away	Date and time	Venue	Referees	Attendance
Brisbane Broncos	12 – 20	Penrith Panthers	Thursday, 15 April, 7:50 pm	Suncorp Stadium	Grant Atkins	21,224
Newcastle Knights	26 – 22	Cronulla-Sutherland Sharks	Friday, 16 April, 6:00 pm	McDonald Jones Stadium	Matt Cecchin	17,039
Melbourne Storm	20 – 4	Sydney Roosters	Friday, 16 April, 7:55 pm	AAMI Park	Adam Gee	15,087
Manly Warringah Sea Eagles	36 – 0	Gold Coast Titans	Saturday, 17 April, 3:00 pm	Glen Willow Regional Sports Stadium	Chris Butler	6,380
South Sydney Rabbitohs	18 – 14	Wests Tigers	Saturday, 17 April, 5:30 pm	Stadium Australia	Gerard Sutton	16,134
Canberra Raiders	10 – 35	Parramatta Eels	Saturday, 17 April, 7:35 pm	GIO Stadium	Ben Cummins	20,089
St. George Illawarra Dragons	14 – 20	New Zealand Warriors	Sunday, 18 April, 2:00 pm	Netstrata Jubilee Stadium	Chris Sutton	11,222
North Queensland Cowboys	30–18	Canterbury-Bankstown Bulldogs	Sunday, 18 April, 4:05 pm	Queensland Country Bank Stadium	Ashley Klein	11,965

- Penrith became the first team to win 21 straight regular season games.
- Penrith won 11 straight away games, the most in NRL history.
- Jack Hetherington of Canterbury was sent off at the 55th minute mark in the Bulldogs game against North Queensland.
- The Eels won in Canberra for the first time since 2006.

=== Round 7 (ANZAC Round) ===
Home	Score	Away	Match information			
Home	Score	Away	Date and time	Venue	Referees	Attendance
Penrith Panthers	24 – 6	Newcastle Knights	Thursday, 22 April, 7:50 pm	BlueBet Stadium	Gerard Sutton	16,110
Gold Coast Titans	30 – 40	South Sydney Rabbitohs	Friday, 23 April, 6:00 pm	Cbus Super Stadium	Chris Sutton	17,383
Parramatta Eels	46 – 6	Brisbane Broncos	Friday, 23 April, 7:55 pm	TIO Stadium	Grant Atkins	12,056
Cronulla-Sutherland Sharks	12 – 18	Canterbury-Bankstown Bulldogs	Saturday, 24 April, 5:30 pm	Netstrata Jubilee Stadium	Chris Butler	7,420
North Queensland Cowboys	26 – 24	Canberra Raiders	Saturday, 24 April, 7:35 pm	Queensland Country Bank Stadium	Peter Gough	13,791
Wests Tigers	6 – 40	Manly Warringah Sea Eagles	Sunday, 25 April, 1:45 pm	Bankwest Stadium	Adam Gee	14,095
Sydney Roosters	34 – 10	St. George Illawarra Dragons	Sunday, 25 April, 4:05 pm	Sydney Cricket Ground	Ashley Klein	37,620
Melbourne Storm	42 – 20	New Zealand Warriors	Sunday, 25 April, 6:15 pm	AAMI Park	Matt Cecchin	20,320

- The crowd of 12,056 for the Parramatta vs Brisbane match at TIO Stadium is the highest club rugby league match attendance in Darwin's history.
- Canterbury became the first team to use the 18th man since it was introduced several weeks earlier, after having two players ruled out with concussion during their game against Cronulla.
- The crowd of 37,620 is the highest crowd for an NRL game during the pandemic and the highest since the 2019 NRL Grand Final.
- Penrith became the first team to win 22 straight regular season games.

=== Round 8 ===
Home	Score	Away	Match information			
Home	Score	Away	Date and time	Venue	Referees	Attendance
Canberra Raiders	20 – 34	South Sydney Rabbitohs	Thursday, 29 April, 7:50 pm	GIO Stadium	Ben Cummins	14,260
Melbourne Storm	40 – 14	Cronulla-Sutherland Sharks	Friday, 30 April, 6:00 pm	AAMI Park	Gerard Sutton	10,069
Brisbane Broncos	36 – 28	Gold Coast Titans	Friday, 30 April, 7:55 pm	Suncorp Stadium	Adam Gee	21,322
Penrith Panthers	28 – 16	Manly Warringah Sea Eagles	Saturday, 1 May, 3:00 pm	Carrington Park	Ashley Klein	5,798
Canterbury-Bankstown Bulldogs	10 – 32	Parramatta Eels	Saturday, 1 May, 5:30 pm	Stadium Australia	Peter Gough	13,273
Newcastle Knights	4 – 38	Sydney Roosters	Saturday, 1 May, 7:35 pm	McDonald Jones Stadium	Matt Cecchin	22,172
New Zealand Warriors	24 – 20	North Queensland Cowboys	Sunday, 2 May, 2:00 pm	Central Coast Stadium	Chris Butler	3,692
St. George Illawarra Dragons	8 – 16	Wests Tigers	Sunday, 2 May, 4:05 pm	WIN Stadium	Chris Sutton	12,323

- Brisbane recorded their biggest ever comeback after being down 22–0 during the 1st half of their game against the Gold Coast Titans.
- Penrith became the 4th ever NRL team since the NRL era (1998) to be undefeated after the first 8 games in the season.

=== Round 9 ===
Home	Score	Away	Match information			
Home	Score	Away	Date and time	Venue	Referees	Attendance
South Sydney Rabbitohs	0 – 50	Melbourne Storm	Thursday, 6 May, 7:50 pm	Stadium Australia	Grant Atkins	7,501
Penrith Panthers	48 – 0	Cronulla-Sutherland Sharks	Friday, 7 May, 6:00 pm	BlueBet Stadium	Chris Butler	16,110
Parramatta Eels	31 – 18	Sydney Roosters	Friday, 7 May, 7:55 pm	Bankwest Stadium	Matt Cecchin	25,118
Canberra Raiders	16 – 24	Newcastle Knights	Saturday, 8 May, 3:00 pm	McDonalds Park	Adam Gee	6,642
Wests Tigers	28 – 36	Gold Coast Titans	Saturday, 8 May, 5:30 pm	Campbelltown Stadium	Ashley Klein	8,411
North Queensland Cowboys	19 – 18	Brisbane Broncos	Saturday, 8 May, 7:35 pm	Queensland Country Bank Stadium	Chris Sutton	22,222
Manly Warringah Sea Eagles	38 – 32	New Zealand Warriors	Sunday, 9 May, 2:00 pm	Lottoland	Peter Gough	6,726
St. George Illawarra Dragons	32 – 12	Canterbury-Bankstown Bulldogs	Sunday, 9 May, 4:05 pm	Netstrata Jubilee Stadium	Ben Cummins	7,253

- South Sydney recorded their worst loss since Round 16, 2006.

=== Round 10 (Magic Round) ===
Home	Score	Away	Match information			
Home	Score	Away	Date and time	Venue	Referees	Attendance
Wests Tigers	36 – 18	Newcastle Knights	Friday, 14 May, 6:00 pm	Suncorp Stadium	Grant Atkins	31,532
Manly Warringah Sea Eagles	50 – 6	Brisbane Broncos	Friday, 14 May, 8:05 pm	Suncorp Stadium	Gerard Sutton	41,367
Canterbury-Bankstown Bulldogs	18 – 20	Canberra Raiders	Saturday, 15 May, 3:00 pm	Suncorp Stadium	Chris Butler	30,214
Cronulla-Sutherland Sharks	22 – 32	South Sydney Rabbitohs	Saturday, 15 May, 5:30 pm	Suncorp Stadium	Chris Sutton	42,821
Sydney Roosters	30 – 16	North Queensland Cowboys	Saturday, 15 May, 7:45 pm	Suncorp Stadium	Ben Cummins	45,115
New Zealand Warriors	18 – 34	Parramatta Eels	Sunday, 16 May, 1:50 pm	Suncorp Stadium	Ashley Klein	33,175
Melbourne Storm	44 – 18	St. George Illawarra Dragons	Sunday, 16 May, 4:05 pm	Suncorp Stadium	Peter Gough	41,983
Gold Coast Titans	12 – 48	Penrith Panthers	Sunday, 16 May, 6:25 pm	Suncorp Stadium	Adam Gee	43,537

=== Round 11 ===
Home	Score	Away	Match information			
Home	Score	Away	Date and time	Venue	Referees	Attendance
North Queensland Cowboys	36 – 20	Newcastle Knights	Thursday, 20 May, 7:50 pm	Queensland Country Bank Stadium	Ashley Klein	11,208
New Zealand Warriors	30 – 26	Wests Tigers	Friday, 21 May, 6:00 pm	Central Coast Stadium	Matt Noyen	7,009
Cronulla-Sutherland Sharks	13 – 12	St. George Illawarra Dragons	Friday, 21 May, 7:55 pm	Netstrata Jubilee Stadium	Ben Cummins	8,947
Gold Coast Titans	30 – 20	Canterbury-Bankstown Bulldogs	Saturday, 22 May, 3:00 pm	Cbus Super Stadium	Matt Cecchin	11,315
Sydney Roosters	16 – 34	Brisbane Broncos	Saturday, 22 May, 5:30 pm	Sydney Cricket Ground	Peter Gough	13,186
Canberra Raiders	10 – 34	Melbourne Storm	Saturday, 22 May, 7:35 pm	GIO Stadium	Gerard Sutton	14,120
South Sydney Rabbitohs	12 – 56	Penrith Panthers	Sunday, 23 May, 2:00 pm	Apex Oval	Grant Atkins	10,824
Parramatta Eels	6 – 28	Manly Warringah Sea Eagles	Sunday, 23 May, 4:05 pm	Bankwest Stadium	Adam Gee	24,411

- Brisbane won their first game outside of Queensland since Round 16, 2019, ending a 13-game losing streak.
- Penrith became just the 4th side in NSWRL/ARL/NRL history to start a season with 11 wins and no losses. They were also the first side to accomplish this feat since Manly-Warringah in 1995.

=== Round 12 ===
Home	Score	Away	Match information			
Home	Score	Away	Date and time	Venue	Referees	Attendance
Brisbane Broncos	12 – 40	Melbourne Storm	Thursday, 27 May, 7:50 pm	Suncorp Stadium	Ashley Klein	23,600
North Queensland Cowboys	29 – 28	New Zealand Warriors	Friday, 28 May, 6:00 pm	Queensland Country Bank Stadium	Matt Cecchin	14,951
Wests Tigers	34 – 18	St. George Illawarra Dragons	Friday, 28 May, 7:55 pm	Bankwest Stadium	Adam Gee	9,982
Penrith Panthers	30 – 4	Canterbury-Bankstown Bulldogs	Saturday, 29 May, 3:00 pm	BlueBet Stadium	Matt Noyen	16,110
South Sydney Rabbitohs	38 – 20	Parramatta Eels	Saturday, 29 May, 5:30 pm	Stadium Australia	Gerard Sutton	20,743
Sydney Roosters	44 – 16	Canberra Raiders	Saturday, 29 May, 7:35 pm	Central Coast Stadium	Grant Atkins	10,113
Cronulla-Sutherland Sharks	38 – 10	Gold Coast Titans	Sunday, 30 May, 2:00 pm	C.ex Coffs International Stadium	Chris Sutton	7,362
Newcastle Knights	18 – 10	Manly Warringah Sea Eagles	Sunday, 30 May, 4:05 pm	McDonald Jones Stadium	Ben Cummins	17,348

=== Round 13 ===
Home	Score	Away	Match information			
Home	Score	Away	Date and time	Venue	Referees	Attendance
St George Illawarra Dragons	52 – 24	Brisbane Broncos	Thursday, 3 June, 7:50 pm	Netstrata Jubilee Stadium	Matt Cecchin	5,107
Wests Tigers	26 – 6	Penrith Panthers	Friday, 4 June, 7:55 pm	Leichhardt Oval	Grant Atkins	9,127
Melbourne Storm	20 – 14	Gold Coast Titans	Saturday, 5 June, 7:35 pm	Sunshine Coast Stadium	Chris Butler	7,630
Newcastle Knights	4 – 40	Parramatta Eels	Sunday, 6 June, 4:05 pm	McDonald Jones Stadium	Adam Gee	23,015
Bye: Canberra Raiders, Canterbury-Bankstown Bulldogs, Cronulla-Sutherland Sharks, Manly-Warringah Sea Eagles, New Zealand Warriors, North Queensland Cowboys, South Sydney Rabbitohs, & Sydney Roosters.

- Due to a COVID-19 lockdown in Victoria, the Melbourne vs Gold Coast match was moved from AAMI Park to the Sunshine Coast Stadium.
- Penrith's loss against the Tigers was their first regular season loss since June 12, 2020.

=== Round 14 ===
Home	Score	Away	Match information			
Home	Score	Away	Date and time	Venue	Referees	Attendance
Manly-Warringah Sea Eagles	50–18	North Queensland Cowboys	Friday, 11 June, 6:00 pm	4 Pines Park	Adam Gee	6,801
Cronulla-Sutherland Sharks	19–18	Penrith Panthers	Friday, 11 June, 7:55 pm	Netstrata Jubilee Stadium	Ashley Klein	5,217
Gold Coast Titans	34–35	Sydney Roosters	Saturday, 12 June, 3:00 pm	Cbus Super Stadium	Ben Cummins	15,111
South Sydney Rabbitohs	24–10	Newcastle Knights	Saturday, 12 June, 5:30 pm	Stadium Australia	Chris Butler	12,156
Canberra Raiders	38–16	Brisbane Broncos	Saturday, 12 June, 7:35 pm	GIO Stadium	Chris Sutton	9,608
New Zealand Warriors	16–42	Melbourne Storm	Sunday, 13 June, 2:00 pm	Central Coast Stadium	Matt Cecchin	8,105
Parramatta Eels	40–12	Wests Tigers	Sunday, 13 June, 4:05 pm	Bankwest Stadium	Grant Atkins	23,417
Canterbury-Bankstown Bulldogs	28-6	St George Illawarra Dragons	Monday, 14 June, 4:05 pm	Stadium Australia	Gerard Sutton	17,382

- Penrith's loss to the Sharks marked their first back to back losses since August 23, 2019.

=== Round 15 ===
Home	Score	Away	Match information			
Home	Score	Away	Date and time	Venue	Referees	Attendance
Brisbane Broncos	0 – 46	South Sydney Rabbitohs	Thursday, 17 June, 7:50 pm	Suncorp Stadium	Adam Gee	19,713
North Queensland Cowboys	24 – 26	Cronulla-Sutherland Sharks	Friday, 18 June, 6:00 pm	Queensland Country Bank Stadium	Peter Gough	13,926
Penrith Panthers	38 – 12	Sydney Roosters	Friday, 18 June, 7:55 pm	BlueBet Stadium	Ashley Klein	14,406
Newcastle Knights	10 – 6	New Zealand Warriors	Saturday, 19 June, 3:00 pm	McDonald Jones Stadium	Chris Butler	9,975
St George Illawarra Dragons	22 – 20	Canberra Raiders	Saturday, 19 June, 5:30 pm	WIN Stadium	Chris Sutton	9,239
Melbourne Storm	66 – 16	Wests Tigers	Saturday, 19 June, 7:35 pm	Sunshine Coast Stadium	Gerard Sutton	5,328
Parramatta Eels	36 – 10	Canterbury-Bankstown Bulldogs	Sunday, 20 June, 2:00 pm	Bankwest Stadium	Matt Cecchin	17,276
Gold Coast Titans	24 – 56	Manly-Warringah Sea Eagles	Sunday, 20 June, 4:05 pm	Cbus Super Stadium	Grant Atkins	14,408

- The Melbourne vs Wests Tigers game was moved from AAMI Park to the Sunshine Coast Stadium due to uncertainty regarding the aftermath of the lockdown in Victoria.

=== Round 16 ===
Home	Score	Away	Match information			
Home	Score	Away	Date and time	Venue	Referees	Attendance
Sydney Roosters	0 – 46	Melbourne Storm	Thursday, 1 July, 7:50 pm	McDonald Jones Stadium	Adam Gee	4,289
New Zealand Warriors	18 – 19	St George Illawarra Dragons	Friday, 2 July, 6:00 pm	Central Coast Stadium	Peter Gough	0
Penrith Panthers	13 – 12	Parramatta Eels	Friday, 2 July, 7:55 pm	BlueBet Stadium	Ashley Klein	0
Canterbury-Bankstown Bulldogs	0 – 66	Manly-Warringah Sea Eagles	Saturday, 3 July, 3:00 pm	Bankwest Stadium	Gerard Sutton	0
Canberra Raiders	6 – 44	Gold Coast Titans	Saturday, 3 July, 5:30 pm	GIO Stadium	Matt Cecchin	7,646
Newcastle Knights	38 – 0	North Queensland Cowboys	Saturday, 3 July, 7:35 pm	McDonald Jones Stadium	Chris Sutton	7,610
Brisbane Broncos	26 – 18	Cronulla-Sutherland Sharks	Sunday, 4 July, 2:00 pm	Suncorp Stadium	Ben Cummins	13,840
Wests Tigers	22 – 38	South Sydney Rabbitohs	Sunday, 4 July, 4:05 pm	Leichhardt Oval	Grant Atkins	0

- Manly's win against Canterbury was their biggest ever.
- All games in Sydney and the Central Coast were played in front of empty stadiums due to the COVID-19 lockdown in Greater Sydney, the Central Coast, the Blue Mountains and Wollongong regions. In addition, the Sydney Roosters vs Melbourne Storm game was moved from the Sydney Cricket Ground to McDonald Jones Stadium.

=== Round 17 ===
Home	Score	Away	Match information			
Home	Score	Away	Date and time	Venue	Referees	Attendance
Manly-Warringah Sea Eagles	16 – 30	Canberra Raiders	Thursday, 8 July, 7:50 pm	4 Pines Park	Adam Gee	0
South Sydney Rabbitohs	46 – 18	North Queensland Cowboys	Friday, 9 July, 7:55 pm	McDonald Jones Stadium	Matt Cecchin	3,127
Canterbury-Bankstown Bulldogs	16 – 22	Sydney Roosters	Saturday, 10 July, 7:35 pm	Bankwest Stadium	Adam Gee	0
Cronulla-Sutherland Sharks	20 – 12	New Zealand Warriors	Sunday, 11 June, 4:05 pm	Netstrata Jubilee Stadium	Chris Sutton	0
Bye: Brisbane Broncos, Gold Coast Titans, Melbourne Storm, Newcastle Knights, Parramatta Eels, Penrith Panthers, St George Illawarra Dragons & Wests Tigers.

=== Round 18 ===
Home	Score	Away	Match information			
Home	Score	Away	Date and time	Venue	Referees	Attendance
Gold Coast Titans	8 – 26	Parramatta Eels	Friday, 16 July, 6:00 pm	Cbus Super Stadium	Matt Cecchin	15,038
Manly-Warringah Sea Eagles	32 – 18	St George Illawarra Dragons	Friday, 16 July, 8:05 pm	Cbus Super Stadium	Adam Gee	15,038
North Queensland Cowboys	18 – 34	Sydney Roosters	Saturday, 17 July, 3:00 pm	Queensland Country Bank Stadium	Ashley Klein	15,933
Canberra Raiders	34 – 18	Cronulla-Sutherland Sharks	Saturday, 17 July, 5:30 pm	Cbus Super Stadium	Grant Atkins	3,874
Melbourne Storm	48 – 4	Newcastle Knights	Saturday, 17 July, 7:35 pm	Cbus Super Stadium	Chris Sutton	3,874
New Zealand Warriors	16 – 30	Penrith Panthers	Sunday, 18 July, 1:55 pm	Suncorp Stadium	Chris Butler	24,894
Brisbane Broncos	24 – 42	Wests Tigers	Sunday, 18 July, 4:05 pm	Suncorp Stadium	Gerard Sutton	24,894
South Sydney Rabbitohs	32 – 24	Canterbury-Bankstown Bulldogs	Sunday, 18 July, 6:15 pm	Cbus Super Stadium	Ben Cummins	2,979

- From round 18, all nine Sydney-based clubs, plus the Canberra Raiders, Newcastle Knights and New Zealand Warriors were based in Queensland due to the COVID-19 lockdown in Greater Sydney, with the Melbourne Storm also basing themselves on the Sunshine Coast due to a COVID-19 lockdown in Melbourne linked to the Sydney cluster.

=== Round 19 ===
Home	Score	Away	Match information			
Home	Score	Away	Date and time	Venue	Referees	Attendance
Parramatta Eels	10 – 12	Canberra Raiders	Thursday, 22 July, 7:50 pm	Cbus Super Stadium	Adam Gee	2,566
Sydney Roosters	28 – 8	Newcastle Knights	Friday, 23 July, 6:00 pm	Sunshine Coast Stadium	Gerard Sutton	2,868
North Queensland Cowboys	16 – 20	Melbourne Storm	Friday, 23 July, 7:55 pm	Queensland Country Bank Stadium	Matt Cecchin	14,924
South Sydney Rabbitohs	60 – 22	New Zealand Warriors	Saturday, 24 July, 3:00 pm	Sunshine Coast Stadium	Chris Butler	7,569
Manly-Warringah Sea Eagles	44 – 24	Wests Tigers	Saturday, 24 July, 5:30 pm	Suncorp Stadium	Ashley Klein	5,761
Penrith Panthers	18 – 12	Brisbane Broncos	Saturday, 24 July, 7:35 pm	Suncorp Stadium	Ben Cummins	8,019
St George Illawarra Dragons	10 – 32	Gold Coast Titans	Sunday, 25 July, 1:50 pm	Cbus Super Stadium	Grant Atkins	4,424
Canterbury-Bankstown Bulldogs	24 – 44	Cronulla-Sutherland Sharks	Sunday, 25 July, 4:05 pm	Cbus Super Stadium	Chris Sutton	4,424

- Both teams were scoreless for the first half in the Eels vs Raiders game. This was the first occurrence of this in an NRL game in two years, with the previous being the Knights vs Sharks game in Round 1, 2019.
- In the Cowboys vs Storm game, Kyle Feldt and Josh Addo-Carr both scored their 100th tries in their NRL careers for their respective teams, occurring in the 51st and 71st minutes, respectively.

=== Round 20 ===
Home	Score	Away	Match information			
Home	Score	Away	Date and time	Venue	Referees	Attendance
Sydney Roosters	28 – 0	Parramatta Eels	Thursday, 29 July, 7:50 pm	BB Print Stadium	Grant Atkins	4,926
Wests Tigers	16 – 18	New Zealand Warriors	Friday, 30 July, 6:00 pm	Suncorp Stadium	Ben Cummins	12,443
Brisbane Broncos	37 – 18	North Queensland Cowboys	Friday, 30 July, 8:05 pm	Suncorp Stadium	Chris Sutton	29,136
Newcastle Knights	34 – 24	Canberra Raiders	Sunday, 1 August, 1:50 pm	Suncorp Stadium	Adam Gee	0
Melbourne Storm	37 – 10	Penrith Panthers	Sunday, 1 August, 4:05 pm	Suncorp Stadium	Ashley Klein	0
St George Illawarra Dragons	14 – 50	South Sydney Rabbitohs	Sunday, 1 August, 6:25 pm	Suncorp Stadium	Chris Butler	0
Canterbury-Bankstown Bulldogs	6 – 34	Gold Coast Titans	Monday, 2 August, 6:00 pm	Suncorp Stadium	Matt Cecchin	0
Cronulla-Sutherland Sharks	22 – 40	Manly-Warringah Sea Eagles	Monday, 2 August, 8:05 pm	Suncorp Stadium	Gerard Sutton	0

- BB Print Stadium in Mackay hosted their third ever NRL game, and their first in 8 years, since their last in 2013.
- Browne Park in Rockhampton and Moreton Daily Stadium in Redcliffe were originally scheduled to host their first ever NRL games for premiership points. However, following a lockdown announced on 31 July in South East Queensland due to a COVID-19 outbreak, these games, along with the Bulldogs vs Titans game, were moved to Suncorp Stadium. They were played in front of an empty stadium, with 31 July games moved to 1 August, and 1 August games moved to 2 August.

=== Round 21 ===
Home	Score	Away	Match information			
Home	Score	Away	Date and time	Venue	Referees	Attendance
Newcastle Knights	28 – 20	Brisbane Broncos	Thursday, 5 August, 7:50 pm	Suncorp Stadium	Grant Atkins	0
Canberra Raiders	20 – 12	St George Illawarra Dragons	Friday, 6 August, 6:00 pm	Cbus Super Stadium	Chris Sutton	0
Parramatta Eels	12 – 40	South Sydney Rabbitohs	Friday, 6 August, 8:05 pm	Cbus Super Stadium	Ashley Klein	0
New Zealand Warriors	18 – 16	Cronulla-Sutherland Sharks	Saturday, 7 August, 3:00 pm	Cbus Super Stadium	Matt Cecchin	0
Sydney Roosters	14 – 20	Penrith Panthers	Saturday, 7 August, 5:30 pm	Suncorp Stadium	Gerard Sutton	0
Manly-Warringah Sea Eagles	18 – 28	Melbourne Storm	Saturday, 7 August, 7:35 pm	Suncorp Stadium	Adam Gee	0
Canterbury-Bankstown Bulldogs	16 – 28	Wests Tigers	Sunday, 8 August, 1:50 pm	Cbus Super Stadium	Chris Butler	0
Gold Coast Titans	36 – 14	North Queensland Cowboys	Sunday, 8 August, 4:05 pm	Cbus Super Stadium	Ben Cummins	0

- All games were played in front of empty stadiums due to the COVID-19 outbreak and lockdown in South East Queensland. In addition, the Knights vs Broncos and the Bulldogs vs Tigers games were moved from Sunshine Coast Stadium and Moreton Daily Stadium to Suncorp Stadium and Cbus Super Stadium, respectively.
- In the Eels vs Rabbitohs game, Adam Reynolds surpassed the Rabbitohs' individual player points record of all time, previously held by Eric Simms at 1841 points.

=== Round 22 ===
Home	Score	Away	Match information			
Home	Score	Away	Date and time	Venue	Referees	Attendance
Melbourne Storm	26 – 16	Canberra Raiders	Thursday, 12 August, 7:50 pm	Sunshine Coast Stadium	Gerard Sutton	2,523
St George Illawarra Dragons	16 – 34	Penrith Panthers	Friday, 13 August, 6:00 pm	Suncorp Stadium	Ben Cummins	6,653
Brisbane Broncos	20 – 21	Sydney Roosters	Friday, 13 August, 8:05 pm	Suncorp Stadium	Ashley Klein	14,314
South Sydney Rabbitohs	36 – 6	Gold Coast Titans	Saturday, 14 August, 3:00 pm	Cbus Super Stadium	Adam Gee	4,117
North Queensland Cowboys	16 – 24	Wests Tigers	Saturday, 14 August, 5:30 pm	Queensland Country Bank Stadium	Chris Sutton	12,663
Manly-Warringah Sea Eagles	56 – 10	Parramatta Eels	Saturday, 14 August, 7:35 pm	Sunshine Coast Stadium	Grant Atkins	3,613
New Zealand Warriors	24 – 10	Canterbury-Bankstown Bulldogs	Sunday, 15 August, 1:50 pm	Moreton Daily Stadium	Peter Gough	3,332
Cronulla-Sutherland Sharks	14 – 16	Newcastle Knights	Sunday, 15 August, 4:00 pm	Moreton Daily Stadium	Matt Cecchin	3,954

- Moreton Daily Stadium hosted their first ever NRL games for premiership points. It was previously scheduled to host a match in Round 20, however this was cancelled due to the COVID-19 outbreak and lockdown in South East Queensland earlier in the month.
- In the Storm vs Raiders game, the Storm reached a new club record for the highest number of points in a single season.
- South Sydney won 10 matches in a row for the first time since 1989.
- In the Sea Eagles vs Eels game, Reuben Garrick surpassed the Sea Eagles' individual player points record for a single season, previously held by Matthew Ridge at 257 points.

=== Round 23 ===
Home	Score	Away	Match information			
Home	Score	Away	Date and time	Venue	Referees	Attendance
Gold Coast Titans	20 – 34	Melbourne Storm	Thursday, 19 August, 7:50 pm	Cbus Super Stadium	Ben Cummins	8,288
Canberra Raiders	18 – 19	Manly-Warringah Sea Eagles	Friday, 20 August, 6:00 pm	Suncorp Stadium	Adam Gee	6,181
Penrith Panthers	25 – 12	South Sydney Rabbitohs	Friday, 20 August, 8:05 pm	Suncorp Stadium	Grant Atkins	8,848
Wests Tigers	20 – 50	Cronulla-Sutherland Sharks	Saturday, 21 August, 3:00 pm	Browne Park	Gerard Sutton	2,863
Canterbury-Bankstown Bulldogs	16 – 22	Newcastle Knights	Saturday, 21 August, 5:30 pm	Cbus Super Stadium	Peter Gough	2,343
Parramatta Eels	32 – 16	North Queensland Cowboys	Saturday, 21 August, 7:35 pm	Cbus Super Stadium	Ashley Klein	3,013
St George Illawarra Dragons	22 – 40	Sydney Roosters	Sunday, 22 August, 2:00 pm	Clive Berghofer Stadium	Chris Sutton	7,822
Brisbane Broncos	24 – 22	New Zealand Warriors	Sunday, 22 August, 4:05 pm	Suncorp Stadium	Matt Cecchin	18,252

- Browne Park hosted their first ever NRL game for premiership points. It was previously scheduled to host a match in Round 20, however this was cancelled due to the COVID-19 outbreak and lockdown in South East Queensland earlier in the month.
- The Storm tied the record for the most consecutive match wins in a single season, equalling the Eastern Suburbs Roosters record of 19 in 1975.

=== Round 24 ===
Home	Score	Away	Match information			
Home	Score	Away	Date and time	Venue	Referees	Attendance
Newcastle Knights	15 – 14	Gold Coast Titans	Thursday, 26 August, 7:50 pm	Sunshine Coast Stadium	Grant Atkins	2,107
New Zealand Warriors	16 – 28	Canberra Raiders	Friday, 27 August, 6:00 pm	BB Print Stadium	Ben Cummins	4,079
Sydney Roosters	12 – 54	South Sydney Rabbitohs	Friday, 27 August, 7:55 pm	Suncorp Stadium	Ashley Klein	5,136
St George Illawarra Dragons	26 – 38	North Queensland Cowboys	Saturday, 28 August, 3:00 pm	Browne Park	Peter Gough	4,487
Cronulla-Sutherland Sharks	24 – 16	Brisbane Broncos	Saturday, 28 August, 5:30 pm	Suncorp Stadium	Adam Gee	8,618
Melbourne Storm	10 – 22	Parramatta Eels	Saturday, 28 August, 7:35 pm	Suncorp Stadium	Gerard Sutton	10,246
Manly-Warringah Sea Eagles	36 – 18	Canterbury-Bankstown Bulldogs	Sunday, 29 August, 1:50 pm	Moreton Daily Stadium	Chris Sutton	4,910
Penrith Panthers	30 – 16	Wests Tigers	Sunday, 29 August, 4:05 pm	Moreton Daily Stadium	Matt Cecchin	5,351

=== Round 25 ===
Home	Score	Away	Match information			
Home	Score	Away	Date and time	Venue	Referees	Attendance
Canberra Raiders	16 – 40	Sydney Roosters	Thursday, 2 September, 7:50 pm	BB Print Stadium	Gerard Sutton	3,473
Cronulla-Sutherland Sharks	16 – 28	Melbourne Storm	Friday, 3 September, 6:00 pm	Cbus Super Stadium	Grant Atkins	8,580
Parramatta Eels	6 – 40	Penrith Panthers	Friday, 3 September, 8:05 pm	Cbus Super Stadium	Adam Gee	8,580
Brisbane Broncos	35 – 22	Newcastle Knights	Saturday, 4 September, 3:00 pm	Suncorp Stadium	Ziggy Przeklasa-Adamski	20,747
North Queensland Cowboys	18 – 46	Manly-Warringah Sea Eagles	Saturday, 4 September, 5:30 pm	Queensland Country Bank Stadium	Ben Cummins	14,336
South Sydney Rabbitohs	20 – 16	St George Illawarra Dragons	Saturday, 4 September, 7:35 pm	Sunshine Coast Stadium	Matt Cecchin	3,295
Gold Coast Titans	44 – 0	New Zealand Warriors	Sunday, 5 September, 2:00 pm	Cbus Super Stadium	Ashley Klein	12,532
Wests Tigers	0 – 38	Canterbury-Bankstown Bulldogs	Sunday, 5 September, 4:05 pm	Moreton Daily Stadium	Chris Sutton	3,104

- In the Cowboys vs Sea Eagles game, Reuben Garrick surpassed the NRL record for the highest number of points in a regular season at 304 points, previously held by Hazem El Masri at 288 points.
- Matt Cecchin controlled his last NRL game as a referee, after announcing his second NRL retirement earlier in the week.
- The Gold Coast Titans recorded their biggest ever win and the biggest win by any Gold Coast side since Round 16, 1996.

== Finals series ==
Home	Score	Away	Match Information
Home	Score	Away	Date and Time (Local)	Venue	Referees	Crowd
QUALIFYING & ELIMINATION FINALS
Melbourne Storm	40 – 12	Manly Warringah Sea Eagles	10 September 2021, 7:50 pm	Sunshine Coast Stadium	Grant Atkins	9,120
Sydney Roosters	25 – 24	Gold Coast Titans	11 September 2021, 5:40 pm	Queensland Country Bank Stadium	Adam Gee	15,237
Penrith Panthers	10 – 16	South Sydney Rabbitohs	11 September 2021, 7:50 pm	Queensland Country Bank Stadium	Gerard Sutton	18,244
Parramatta Eels	28 – 20	Newcastle Knights	12 September 2021, 4:05 pm	Browne Park	Ashley Klein	5,087
SEMI FINALS
Manly Warringah Sea Eagles	42 – 6	Sydney Roosters	17 September 2021, 7:50 pm	BB Print Stadium	Gerard Sutton	5,824
Penrith Panthers	8 – 6	Parramatta Eels	18 September 2021, 7:50 pm	BB Print Stadium	Ashley Klein	6,011
PRELIMINARY FINALS
South Sydney Rabbitohs	36 – 16	Manly Warringah Sea Eagles	24 September 2021, 8:05 pm	Suncorp Stadium	Ashley Klein	26,249
Melbourne Storm	6 – 10	Penrith Panthers	25 September 2021, 4:00 pm	Suncorp Stadium	Gerard Sutton	29,011
GRAND FINAL
Penrith Panthers	14 – 12	South Sydney Rabbitohs	Sunday, 3 October 6:30pm (AEST), 7:30pm (AEDT)	Suncorp Stadium	Gerard Sutton	39,322

- Queensland Country Bank Stadium, Sunshine Coast Stadium, Browne Park and BB Print Stadium all hosted their first ever NRL finals matches.
- Both preliminary finals had altered starting times. The South Sydney vs Manly final was delayed by 15 minutes after Manly were caught in heavy traffic en route to the game, while the Melbourne vs Penrith final was moved from 7:50pm to 4:00pm to avoid a clash with the 2021 AFL Grand Final.
- Penrith ended an 18 year drought and become the premiers since 2003.
