= List of Gold Coast Titans results =

This is a list of results of the rugby league team the Gold Coast Titans from their debut season in 2007 to present day in the National Rugby League.

== National Rugby League ==
=== 2007 ===
Round	Opponent	Venue	Result	Score
1	St. George Illawarra Dragons	Suncorp Stadium	Loss	18 - 20
2	Cronulla-Sutherland Sharks	Carrara Stadium	Win	18 - 16
3	Canterbury-Bankstown Bulldogs	Telstra Stadium	Loss	6 - 22
4	Penrith Panthers	CUA Stadium	Win	24 - 22
5	Brisbane Broncos	Suncorp Stadium	Win	28 - 16
6	Manly-Warringah Sea Eagles	Brookvale Oval	Loss	6 - 20
7	Parramatta Eels	Carrara Stadium	Win	38 - 12
8	North Queensland Cowboys	Carrara Stadium	Loss	10 - 24
9	Sydney Roosters	Aussie Stadium	Loss	18 - 24
10	St. George Illawarra Dragons	WIN Stadium	Loss	10 - 28
11	South Sydney Rabbitohs	Carrara Stadium	Win	25 - 18
12	Canberra Raiders	Carrara Stadium	Win	28 - 8
13	Bye			
14	Wests Tigers	Campbelltown Stadium	Win	16 - 14
15	Newcastle Knights	Carrara Stadium	Win	28 - 22
16	New Zealand Warriors	Carrara Stadium	Loss	6 - 22
17	Brisbane Broncos	Suncorp Stadium	Loss	18 - 19
18	Canberra Raiders	Canberra Stadium	Loss	10 - 56
19	Canterbury-Bankstown Bulldogs	Carrara Stadium	Loss	12 - 36
20	South Sydney Rabbitohs	Telstra Stadium	Loss	14 - 20
21	Wests Tigers	Carrara Stadium	Win	30 - 14
22	New Zealand Warriors	Mt Smart Stadium	Loss	6 - 30
23	Sydney Roosters	Carrara Stadium	Win	22 - 18
24	Cronulla-Sutherland Sharks	Toyota Park	Loss	12 - 28
25	Melbourne Storm	Olympic Park	Loss	6 - 50

Source: NRL 2007 - Gold Coast Titans Summary

=== 2008 ===
Round	Opponent	Venue	Result	Score
1	North Queensland Cowboys	Skilled Park	Win	36 - 18
2	St. George Illawarra Dragons	WIN Stadium	Loss	12 - 30
3	Cronulla-Sutherland Sharks	Skilled Park	Win	18 - 4
4	Canberra Raiders	Skilled Park	Win	32 - 12
5	Parramatta Eels	Parramatta Stadium	Win	28 - 20
6	Brisbane Broncos	Skilled Park	Win	26 - 24
7	New Zealand Warriors	Skilled Park	Win	36 - 24
8	Newcastle Knights	EnergyAustralia Stadium	Loss	12 - 13
9	Bye			
10	Canterbury-Bankstown Bulldogs	Skilled Park	Win	24 - 20
11	Wests Tigers	Leichhardt Oval	Loss	18 - 20
12	Cronulla-Sutherland Sharks	Toyota Stadium	Loss	14 - 30
13	Melbourne Storm	Skilled Park	Win	18 - 0
14	Bye			
15	South Sydney Rabbitohs	ANZ Stadium	Loss	23 - 24
16	St. George Illawarra Dragons	Skilled Park	Loss	22 - 26
17	Manly-Warringah Sea Eagles	Skilled Park	Loss	14 - 34
18	Sydney Roosters	Sydney Football Stadium	Win	32 - 28
19	Penrith Panthers	Skilled Park	Loss	22 - 36
20	Canberra Raiders	Canberra Stadium	Loss	4 - 46
21	Melbourne Storm	Olympic Park	Loss	4 - 44
22	Newcastle Knights	Skilled Park	Loss	12 - 32
23	North Queensland Cowboys	Dairy Farmers Stadium	Win	26 - 20
24	Brisbane Broncos	Suncorp Stadium	Loss	21 - 25
25	Manly-Warringah Sea Eagles	Brookvale Oval	Loss	10 - 28
26	Wests Tigers	Skilled Park	Loss	12 - 28

Source: NRL 2008 - Gold Coast Titans Summary

=== 2009 ===
Round	Opponent	Venue	Result	Score
1	Newcastle Knights	Skilled Park	Win	34 - 20
2	St. George Illawarra Dragons	WIN Stadium	Loss	10 - 16
3	Canterbury-Bankstown Bulldogs	Skilled Park	Win	20 - 12
4	Melbourne Storm	Olympic Park	Win	18 - 6
5	North Queensland Cowboys	Dairy Farmers Stadium	Win	14 - 10
6	Canberra Raiders	Skilled Park	Win	16 - 10
7	Penrith Panthers	CUA Stadium	Loss	20 - 34
8	South Sydney Rabbitohs	Skilled Park	Win	22 - 14
9	Newcastle Knights	EnergyAustralia Stadium	Loss	18 - 23
10	Brisbane Broncos	Suncorp Stadium	Loss	18 - 32
11	Manly-Warringah Sea Eagles	Skilled Park	Win	18 - 17
12	Bye			
13	St. George Illawarra Dragons	Skilled Park	Win	28 - 24
14	Sydney Roosters	Bluetongue Stadium	Win	24 - 20
15	Bye			
16	New Zealand Warriors	Skilled Park	Win	28 - 12
17	Canberra Raiders	Canberra Stadium	Loss	28 - 34
18	Parramatta Eels	Skilled Park	Win	18 - 12
19	Canterbury-Bankstown Bulldogs	Suncorp Stadium	Loss	16 - 23
20	Brisbane Broncos	Skilled Park	Win	34 - 18
21	North Queensland Cowboys	Skilled Park	Loss	18 - 34
22	New Zealand Warriors	Mt Smart Stadium	Win	30 - 10
23	South Sydney Rabbitohs	ANZ Stadium	Win	22 - 14
24	Cronulla-Sutherland Sharks	Skilled Park	Win	20 - 10
25	Wests Tigers	Skilled Park	Win	36 - 24
26	Manly-Warringah Sea Eagles	Brookvale Oval	Loss	4 - 38
QF	Brisbane Broncos	Skilled Park	Loss	32 - 40
SF	Parramatta Eels	Sydney Football Stadium	Loss	2 - 27

Source: NRL 2009 - Gold Coast Titans Summary

=== 2010 ===
Round	Opponent	Venue	Result	Score
1	New Zealand Warriors	Skilled Park	Win	24 - 18
2	South Sydney Rabbitohs	ANZ Stadium	Win	19 - 18
3	Canberra Raiders	Skilled Park	Win	24 - 4
4	North Queensland Cowboys	Dairy Farmers Stadium	Loss	18 - 32
5	Melbourne Storm	Skilled Park	Win	20 - 16
6	St. George Illawarra Dragons	Skilled Park	Loss	6 - 19
7	Manly-Warringah Sea Eagles	Brookvale Oval	Win	24 - 22
8	Penrith Panthers	Skilled Park	Win	38 - 24
9	Newcastle Knights	EnergyAustralia Stadium	Win	38 - 36
10	Brisbane Broncos	Suncorp Stadium	Loss	6 - 28
11	Bye			
12	Sydney Roosters	Skilled Park	Loss	16 - 30
13	Canberra Raiders	Canberra Stadium	Loss	24 - 28
14	Manly-Warringah Sea Eagles	Skilled Park	Win	28 - 14
15	Canterbury-Bankstown Bulldogs	Suncorp Stadium	Win	25 - 24
16	Newcastle Knights	Skilled Park	Loss	16 - 24
17	Bye			
18	Wests Tigers	Campbelltown Stadium	Loss	14 - 15
19	Brisbane Broncos	Skilled Park	Loss	10 - 24
20	St. George Illawarra Dragons	WIN Jubilee Oval	Win	11 - 10
21	New Zealand Warriors	Mt Smart Stadium	Win	28 - 20
22	Parramatta Eels	Skilled Park	Win	34 - 12
23	North Queensland Cowboys	Skilled Park	Win	37 - 18
24	Sydney Roosters	Sydney Football Stadium	Win	23 - 14
25	Cronulla-Sutherland Sharks	Toyota Stadium	Loss	16 - 30
26	Wests Tigers	Skilled Park	Win	21 - 18
QF	New Zealand Warriors	Skilled Park	Win	28 - 16
PF	Sydney Roosters	Suncorp Stadium	Loss	6 - 32

Source: NRL 2010 - Gold Coast Titans Summary

=== 2011 ===
Round	Opponent	Venue	Result	Score
1	St. George Illawarra Dragons	Skilled Park	Loss	16 - 25
2	Melbourne Storm	AAMI Park	Loss	12 - 40
3	Brisbane Broncos	Skilled Park	Loss	8 - 14
4	Canberra Raiders	Canberra Stadium	Win	23 - 22
5	North Queensland Cowboys	Dairy Farmers Stadium	Loss	12 - 22
6	Wests Tigers	Skilled Park	Win	20 - 14
7	Parramatta Eels	Parramatta Stadium	Loss	18 - 22
8	Sydney Roosters	Skilled Park	Win	24 - 13
9	New Zealand Warriors	Skilled Park	Loss	14 - 34
10	Manly-Warringah Sea Eagles	Skilled Park	Loss	12 - 16
11	Bye			
12	Canterbury-Bankstown Bulldogs	Suncorp Stadium	Loss	6 - 28
13	Penrith Panthers	Skilled Park	Loss	10 - 23
14	St. George Illawarra Dragons	WIN Jubilee Oval	Win	28 - 14
15	South Sydney Rabbitohs	ANZ Stadium	Loss	8 - 31
16	Cronulla-Sutherland Sharks	Skilled Park	Loss	12 - 36
17	Bye			
18	New Zealand Warriors	Mt Smart Stadium	Loss	6 - 22
19	Brisbane Broncos	Suncorp Stadium	Loss	10 - 30
20	North Queensland Cowboys	Skilled Park	Loss	20 - 28
21	Newcastle Knights	Ausgrid Stadium	Loss	20 - 50
22	Cronulla-Sutherland Sharks	Toyota Stadium	Win	20 - 16
23	Melbourne Storm	Skilled Park	Loss	16 - 40
24	Canberra Raiders	Skilled Park	Win	26 - 18
25	Wests Tigers	Campbelltown Stadium	Loss	10 - 39
26	Parramatta Eels	Skilled Park	Loss	12 - 32

Source: NRL 2011 - Gold Coast Titans Summary

=== 2012 ===
Round	Opponent	Venue	Result	Score
1	North Queensland Cowboys	Dairy Farmers Stadium	Win	18 - 0
2	Canberra Raiders	Skilled Park	Loss	12 - 24
3	Melbourne Storm	Skilled Park	Loss	6 - 30
4	New Zealand Warriors	Mt Smart Stadium	Loss	6 - 26
5	Canterbury-Bankstown Bulldogs	Skilled Park	Loss	20 - 30
6	Sydney Roosters	Skilled Park	Loss	12 - 18
7	Manly-Warringah Sea Eagles	Brookvale Oval	Win	26 - 14
8	Brisbane Broncos	Suncorp Stadium	Loss	6 - 26
9	Wests Tigers	Skilled Park	Loss	14 - 15
10	Canterbury-Bankstown Bulldogs	Suncorp Stadium	Win	25 - 14
11	Bye			
12	Newcastle Knights	Hunter Stadium	Win	24 - 12
13	North Queensland Cowboys	Skilled Park	Win	28 - 12
14	Cronulla-Sutherland Sharks	Toyota Stadium	Loss	12 - 22
15	Penrith Panthers	Skilled Park	Win	36 - 18
16	St. George Illawarra Dragons	WIN Stadium	Loss	6 - 8
17	Bye			
18	New Zealand Warriors	Skilled Park	Loss	14 - 32
19	Canberra Raiders	Canberra Stadium	Win	38 - 26
20	Brisbane Broncos	Skilled Park	Win	14 - 10
21	Sydney Roosters	Allianz Stadium	Win	36 - 16
22	South Sydney Rabbitohs	Skilled Park	Loss	18 - 22
23	Melbourne Storm	AAMI Park	Loss	16 - 24
24	Parramatta Eels	Skilled Park	Win	24 - 16
25	Penrith Panthers	Centrebet Stadium	Loss	22 - 36
26	Manly-Warringah Sea Eagles	Skilled Park	Loss	16 - 24

Source: NRL 2012 - Gold Coast Titans Summary

=== 2013 ===
Round	Opponent	Venue	Result	Score
1	Cronulla-Sutherland Sharks	Sharks Stadium	Loss	10 - 12
2	Canberra Raiders	Skilled Park	Win	36 - 0
3	Manly-Warringah Sea Eagles	Skilled Park	Win	16 - 14
4	Penrith Panthers	Centrebet Stadium	Win	28 - 10
5	Brisbane Broncos	Skilled Park	Loss	12 - 32
6	Parramatta Eels	Skilled Park	Win	28 - 22
7	Newcastle Knights	Skilled Park	Loss	6 - 30
8	New Zealand Warriors	Mt Smart Stadium	Loss	24 - 25
9	St. George Illawarra Dragons	Skilled Park	Win	15 - 14
10	Brisbane Broncos	Suncorp Stadium	Loss	6 - 32
11	Parramatta Eels	Mudgee Stadium	Win	42 - 4
12	North Queensland Cowboys	Skilled Park	Win	31 - 12
13	Bye			
14	South Sydney Rabbitohs	Barlow Park	Loss	24 - 30
15	Melbourne Storm	Skilled Park	Win	18 - 12
16	Newcastle Knights	Hunter Stadium	Loss	16 - 46
17	Penrith Panthers	TIO Stadium	Loss	18 - 40
18	Bye			
19	Manly-Warringah Sea Eagles	Brookvale Oval	Loss	20 - 38
20	South Sydney Rabbitohs	Skilled Park	Loss	4 - 32
21	Wests Tigers	Skilled Park	Win	36 - 6
22	Canterbury-Bankstown Bulldogs	ANZ Stadium	Win	26 - 16
23	North Queensland Cowboys	1300SMILES Stadium	Loss	10 - 22
24	New Zealand Warriors	Skilled Park	Loss	22 - 24
25	Sydney Roosters	Allianz Stadium	Win	30 - 22
26	Melbourne Storm	AAMI Park	Loss	22 - 23

Source: NRL 2013 - Gold Coast Titans Summary

=== 2014 ===
Round	Opponent	Venue	Result	Score
1	Cronulla-Sutherland Sharks	Remondis Stadium	Win	18 - 12
2	Wests Tigers	Cbus Super Stadium	Loss	12 - 42
3	Canberra Raiders	GIO Stadium	Win	24 - 12
4	North Queensland Cowboys	Cbus Super Stadium	Win	13 - 12
5	Melbourne Storm	AAMI Park	Win	28 - 26
6	Brisbane Broncos	Cbus Super Stadium	Win	12 - 8
7	Penrith Panthers	Sportingbet Stadium	Loss	12 - 14
8	Wests Tigers	Leichhardt Oval	Win	22 - 6
9	South Sydney Rabbitohs	Cbus Super Stadium	Loss	18 - 40
10	Brisbane Broncos	Suncorp Stadium	Loss	8 - 22
11	New Zealand Warriors	Cbus Super Stadium	Loss	16 - 24
12	Bye			
13	Penrith Panthers	Cbus Super Stadium	Loss	14 - 36
14	Melbourne Storm	Cbus Super Stadium	Loss	20 - 24
15	St. George Illawarra Dragons	Cbus Super Stadium	Loss	18 - 19
16	Bye			
17	South Sydney Rabbitohs	ANZ Stadium	Win	14 - 10
18	Canberra Stadium	Cbus Super Stadium	Loss	20 - 36
19	Newcastle Knights	Hunter Stadium	Win	22 - 8
20	Parramatta Eels	Cbus Super Stadium	Loss	18 - 24
21	North Queensland Cowboys	1300SMILES Stadium	Loss	8 - 28
22	Sydney Roosters	Allianz Stadium	Loss	18 - 26
23	Manly-Warringah Sea Eagles	Cbus Super Stadium	Loss	12 - 15
24	St. George Illawarra Dragons	WIN Jubilee Oval	Loss	6 - 34
25	New Zealand Warriors	Mt Smart Stadium	Loss	0 - 42
26	Canterbury-Bankstown Bulldogs	Cbus Super Stadium	Win	19 - 18

Source: NRL 2014 - Gold Coast Titans Summary

=== 2015 ===
Round	Opponent	Venue	Result	Score
1	Wests Tigers	Cbus Super Stadium	Loss	18 - 19
2	Penrith Panthers	Carrington Park	Loss	0 - 40
3	Newcastle Knights	Cbus Super Stadium	Loss	18 - 20
4	Cronulla-Sutherland Sharks	Remondis Stadium	Win	24 - 22
5	Brisbane Broncos	Cbus Super Stadium	Loss	16 - 26
6	Parramatta Eels	Pirtek Stadium	Win	38 - 16
7	Penrith Panthers	Cbus Super Stadium	Win	32 - 6
8	New Zealand Warriors	Mt Smart Stadium	Win	32 - 26
9	Canberra Raiders	GIO Stadium	Loss	16 - 56
10	Cronulla-Sutherland Sharks	Cbus Super Stadium	Loss	22 - 23
11	Bye			
12	South Sydney Rabbitohs	Cbus Super Stadium	Loss	16 - 22
13	Wests Tigers	Leichhardt Oval	Win	27 - 20
14	Canterbury-Bankstown Bulldogs	Cbus Super Stadium	Win	28 - 14
15	New Zealand Warriors	Cbus Super Stadium	Loss	14 - 36
16	Sydney Roosters	Central Coast Stadium	Loss	10 - 20
17	Bye			
18	Manly-Warringah Sea Eagles	Cbus Super Stadium	Loss	6 - 38
19	Newcastle Knights	Hunter Stadium	Loss	2 - 30
20	Brisbane Broncos	Suncorp Stadium	Loss	0 - 34
21	Parramatta Eels	Cbus Super Stadium	Win	24 - 14
22	Melbourne Storm	AAMI Park	Loss	14 - 36
23	Canterbury-Bankstown Bulldogs	Central Coast Stadium	Loss	14 - 36
24	Canberra Raiders	Cbus Super Stadium	Win	28 - 12
25	St. George Illawarra Dragons	Cbus Super Stadium	Win	28 - 26
26	North Queensland Cowboys	1300SMILES Stadium	Loss	12 - 42

Source: NRL 2015 - Gold Coast Titans Summary

=== 2016 ===
Round	Opponent	Venue	Result	Score
1	Newcastle Knights	Cbus Super Stadium	Win	30 - 10
2	Melbourne Storm	AAMI Park	Loss	16 - 34
3	Wests Tigers	Cbus Super Stadium	Win	30 - 18
4	Canberra Raiders	GIO Stadium	Win	24 - 20
5	Brisbane Broncos	Cbus Super Stadium	Loss	16 - 24
6	Cronulla-Sutherland Sharks	Southern Cross Group Stadium	Loss	20 - 25
7	St. George Illawarra Dragons	Cbus Super Stadium	Loss	14 - 19
8	Canterbury-Bankstown Bulldogs	ANZ Stadium	Loss	20 - 21
9	Melbourne Storm	Cbus Super Stadium	Loss	0 - 38
10	Sydney Roosters	Cbus Super Stadium	Win	26 - 6
11	Penrith Panthers	Pepper Stadium	Win	28 - 24
12	Bye			
13	South Sydney Rabbitohs	nib Stadium	Win	29 - 28
14	Parramatta Eels	TIO Stadium		
15	Manly-Warringah Sea Eagles	Cbus Super Stadium		
16	Canberra Raiders	Cbus Super Stadium		
17	New Zealand Warriors	Mt Smart Stadium		
18	Bye			
19	St. George Illawarra Dragons	WIN Jubilee Oval		
20	Parramatta Eels	Cbus Super Stadium		
21	Cronulla-Sutherland Sharks	Cbus Super Stadium		
22	New Zealand Warriors	Cbus Super Stadium		
23	Wests Tigers	Campbelltown Stadium		
24	Newcastle Knights	Hunter Stadium		
25	Penrith Panthers	Cbus Super Stadium		
26	North Queensland Cowboys	1300SMILES Stadium		

== Win–loss record ==
Opponent	Played	Won	Drawn	Lost	Win %
Brisbane Broncos	20	5	0	15	25.0
Canberra Raiders	18	11	0	7	61.1
Canterbury-Bankstown Bulldogs	14	7	0	7	50.0
Cronulla-Sutherland Sharks	14	6	0	8	42.9
Manly Warringah Sea Eagles	14	5	0	9	35.7
Melbourne Storm	16	5	0	11	31.3
Newcastle Knights	15	11	0	4	76.66
New Zealand Warriors	18	7	0	11	38.9
North Queensland Cowboys	16	8	0	8	50.0
Parramatta Eels	13	9	0	4	69.2
Penrith Panthers	14	6	0	8	42.9
St. George Illawarra Dragons	16	5	0	11	31.3
South Sydney Rabbitohs	14	6	0	8	42.9
Sydney Roosters	14	8	0	6	57.1
Wests Tigers	16	9	0	7	56.3
Total	232	103	0	129	44.4
