= Browne Park =

Stadium in Wandal, Queensland

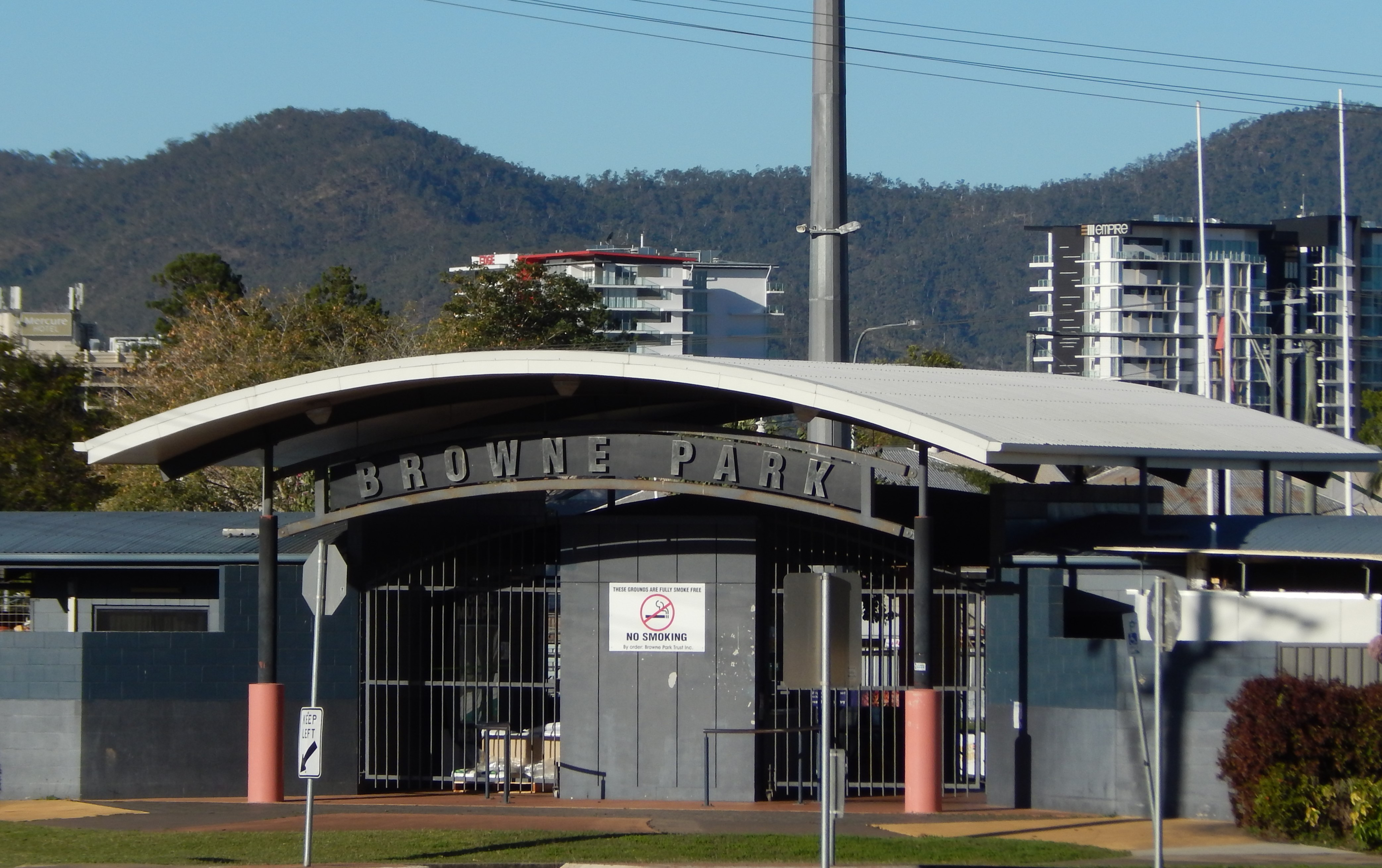
- Interactive map of Browne Park
- Location: Wandal, Rockhampton, Queensland
- Coordinates: 23°22′36″S 150°30′6″E
- Owner: Queensland Government
- Operator: Management of Browne Park Inc.
- Capacity: 7,000
- Surface: Grass

Construction
- Groundbreaking: 1889
- Opened: 1890
- Rebuilt: 2024–2026
- Cost: A$62.78m

Tenant
- Central Queensland Capras (1980-present)

Browne Park (also known as Aurizon Stadium under naming rights) has been the home of rugby football in Central Queensland since 1890. It hosted a match of the 2008 Rugby League World Cup. The ground was named Browne Park in 1958 as a posthumous honour to long serving president of Rockhampton Rugby League, Jack Browne who died in office.

== Central Queensland Capras ==
The Central Queensland Capras play all Queensland Cup home games at Browne Park in Rockhampton. Browne Park is seen as the home of rugby league in Central Queensland and is located between George Street (Bruce Highway) and Murray Street.

== National Rugby League ==
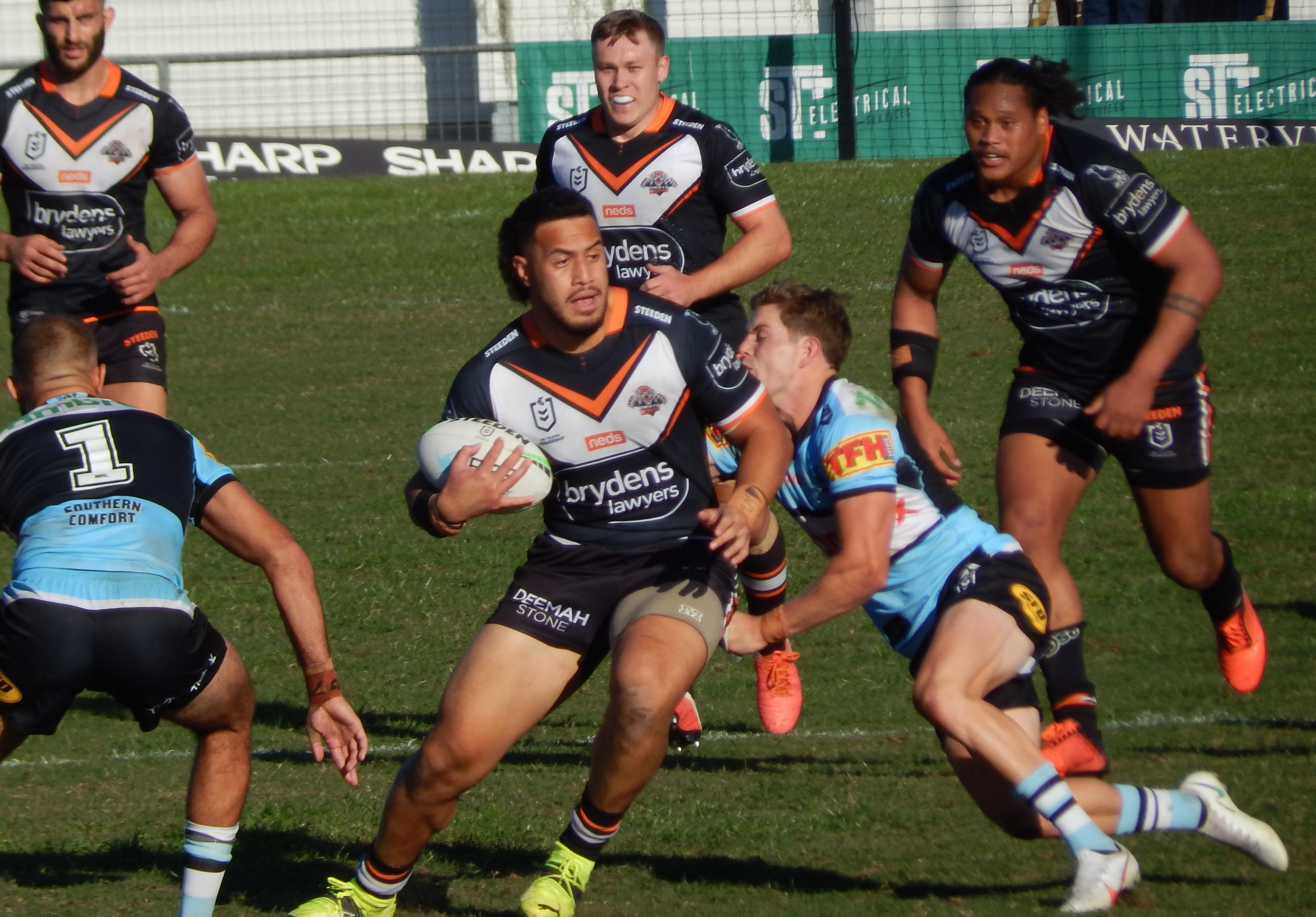
Wests Tigers and Cronulla Sharks players competing in Round 23 at Browne Park on 21 August 2021

In July 2021, it was announced Browne Park would host its first National Rugby League game. It was selected as the venue for the Round 20 NRL game between the St. George Illawarra Dragons and the South Sydney Rabbitohs. The announcement came after the Sydney and Canberra rugby league teams relocated to South East Queensland due to the COVID-19 outbreak in Sydney.

However, the game at Browne Park was suddenly and unexpectedly cancelled just hours before kick-off on 31 July 2021 after a COVID-19 outbreak in Brisbane originating from a cluster detected at Indooroopilly State High School forced a snap lockdown in South East Queensland. The South Sydney Rabbitohs had already landed at Rockhampton Airport when the decision was made to cancel the game. The team were instructed to fly back to Brisbane without disembarking the aircraft while the St George Illawarra Dragons had not yet departed Brisbane. Organisers advised all ticketholders would be refunded and they were hopeful the city could secure another NRL game in the future.

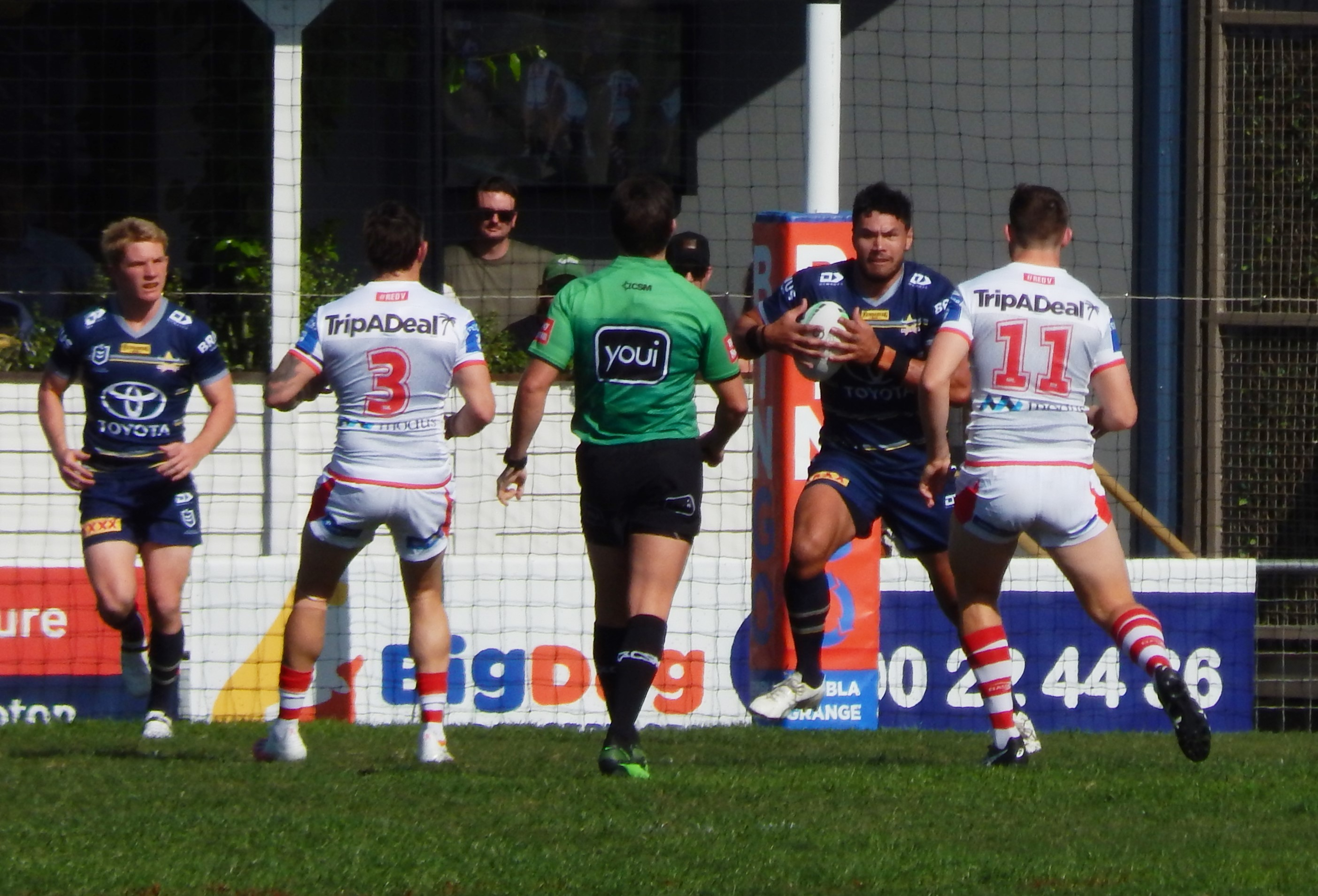
St. George Illawarra Dragons and North Queensland Cowboys players competing in Round 24 at Browne Park on 28 August 2021

The Rockhampton NRL game had generated considerable hype around Central Queensland with local newspaper CQ Today even publishing a special "NRL Souvenir Edition" with an eight page wraparound featuring numerous stories relating to the historic game at Browne Park. The Rockhampton game was also promoted as a "homecoming" for both Dragons coach Anthony Griffin and captain Ben Hunt who were both born in the city.

On 13 August 2021 it was announced Browne Park would host two NRL games to make up for the disappointment over the cancellation of the Round 20 game. The venue selected to host both the Round 23 match between the Wests Tigers and the Cronulla-Sutherland Sharks, and the Round 24 fixture between the St George Illawarra Dragons and the North Queensland Cowboys.

Tickets were capped at 5,000. The first game on 21 August 2021 where the Sharks beat the Tigers 50-20 attracted a crowd of 2,863 people while the presence of a Queensland-based team the following week boosted the attendance with 4,487 people watching the Cowboys defeat the Dragons 38-26 on 28 August 2021.

Browne Park hosted an Elimination Final Match as part of the 2021 NRL Finals Series on 12 September 2021. The match was between the Parramatta Eels and the Newcastle Knights. The Eels won 28-20.

The NRL games at Browne Park in 2021 came six years after an initial proposal for Rockhampton to host an NRL match. Following the impact of Cyclone Marcia on the city and region in 2015, a proposal for an NRL game to be held at Browne Park was put forward by Central Queensland NRL bid chairman Geoff Murphy and mayor Margaret Strelow. It culminated in Queensland premier Annastacia Palaszczuk and state MP Bill Byrne announcing that the Queensland Government had agreed to in-principle support for the event, allocated $250,000 for the city to host the game in August 2015, speculated to have been the Round 24 clash between the Gold Coast Titans and the Canberra Raiders.

However, NRL chief executive Dave Smith announced the following month that due to budget constraints, there would be no NRL game in Rockhampton in 2015. Strelow described the decision as "a bitter blow".

== Attendance Records ==
Crowd	Date	Event	Sport
6,500	11 February 2006	Brisbane Broncos v. North Queensland Cowboys (preseason trial)	Rugby league
5,913	8 November 2008	Scotland v. Tonga (World Cup playoff)	Rugby league
5,087	12 September 2021	Parramatta Eels v. Newcastle Knights (elimination final)	Rugby league
4,487	28 August 2021	St. George Illawarra Dragons v. North Queensland Cowboys (Round 24)	Rugby league
4,000	13 February 2010	Brisbane Broncos v. Melbourne Storm (preseason trial)	Rugby league
2,863	21 August 2021	Wests Tigers v. Cronulla-Sutherland Sharks (Round 23)	Rugby league

== Redevelopments ==
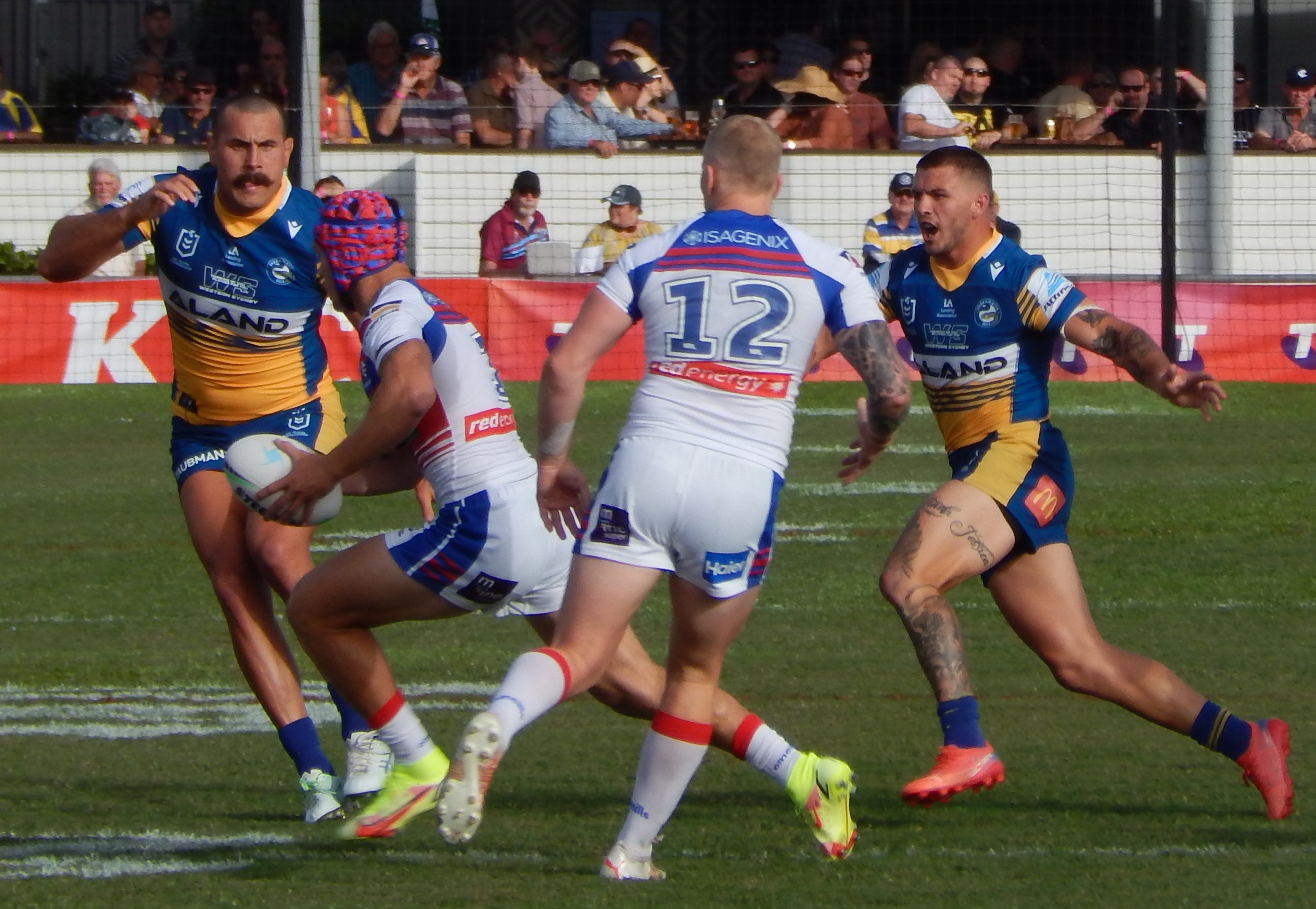
Parramatta Eels and Newcastle Knights players competing in an elimination final held at Browne Park on 12 September 2021

In 2004, Browne Park was transformed into one of Queensland's best regional rugby league venues. The field was moved just on 10 metres towards the Albert Street (hill end) boundary to accommodate the redevelopment of the Rockhampton Leagues Club. This process saw the introduction of a new irrigation system, new lighting towers and new entrance to the ground.

At the end of the 2006 season, construction began on a new grandstand along the George Street side of the field. The undercover George Street Grandstand, now completed, has 614 colourful bucket seats, which are also closer to the field for an improved viewing experience. It was named in honour of local rugby league identity Nev Callaghan.

Browne Park currently has a seating capacity of approximately 7,000.

=== 2024-2026 Redevelopment ===
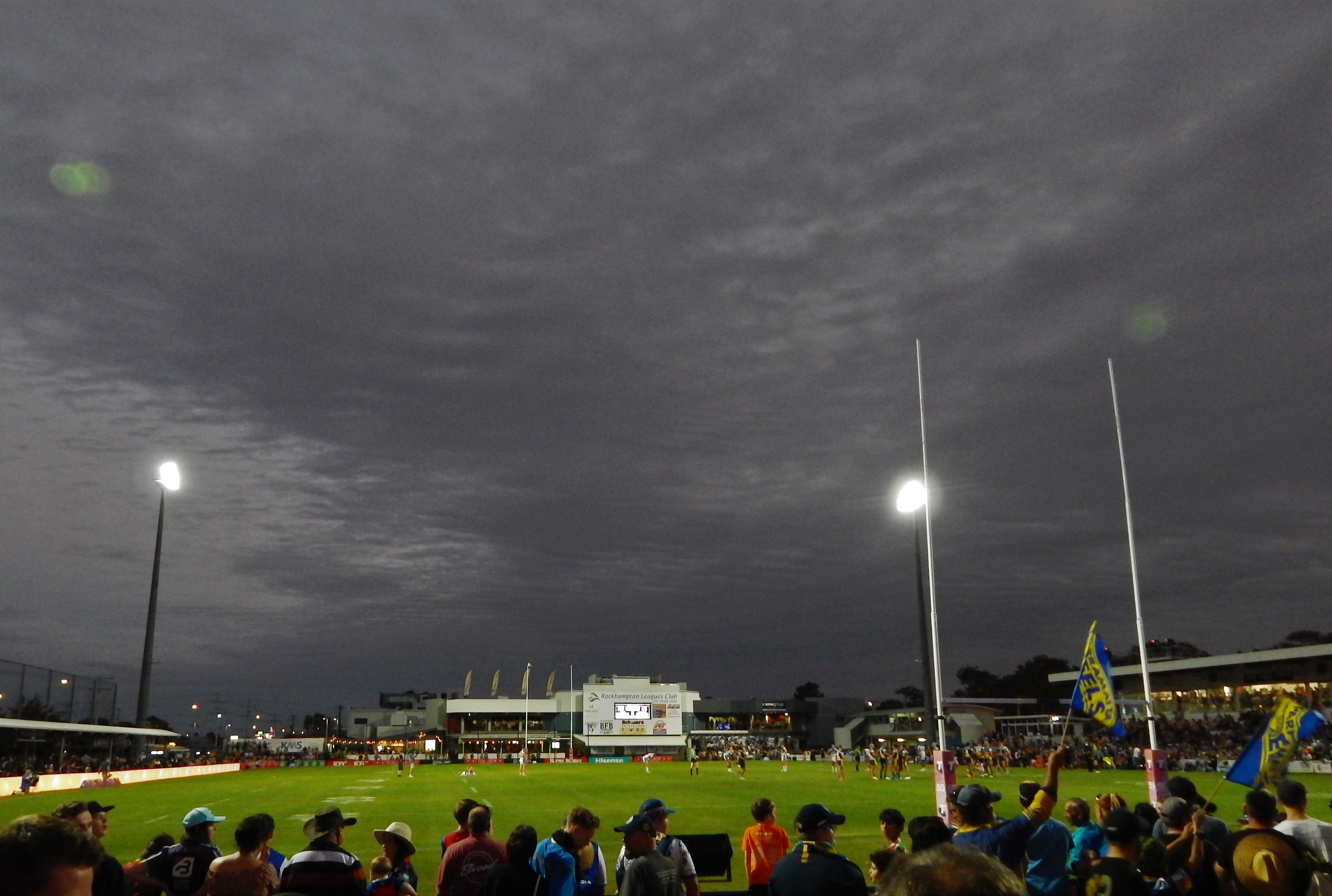
The final minutes of the NRL elimination final between Parramatta and Newcastle on 12 September 2021

In September 2020, the Queensland Government committed $25 million for a redevelopment of Browne Park. Seating capacity will be increased via the replacement of the Jack Crow Stand with a new grandstand that will seat nearly 4,000 spectators along with improved player facilities.

This announcement came after several years of lobbying from the Browne Park Trust, led by chairperson Paul Hoolihan, for funding to redevelop the ground.

With the hope of attracting National Rugby League games to the city, the state government pledged a commitment of $150,000 in 2018 to fast track a feasibility study into transforming Browne Park into a 10,000-seat stadium.

During this time, supporters of Browne Park's redevelopment faced a rival proposal to construct a brand new stadium alongside the Fitzroy River at the Victoria Park sports precinct, which was put forward by a consortium of community representatives led by co-president of the rival Rockhampton Sports Club, former Australian touch football captain Gavin Shuker. With the Victoria Park proposal attracting funding from the federal government and the state government preferring to see Browne Park redeveloped, it became a contentious political issue between the two levels of government. However, supporters of the redevelopment of Browne Park which is considered the city's "spiritual home of rugby league" are unperturbed by the stadium at Victoria Park which is expected to be completed by 2023.

In June 2021, QRL Central Division manager Rob Crow said the Browne Park redevelopment project was "full steam ahead" and indicated the tendering process for a project manager and a project architect was about to commence. Member for Rockhampton Barry O'Rourke confirmed funding for the project would be included in the 2022 state budget and expected shovels in the ground following the 2022 rugby league season.

The redevelopment was completed in April 2026, ahead of the Central Queensland Capras Queensland Cup match against the Burleigh Bears on May 2.

== Lighting ==
The lighting at Browne Park has three levels - training, match and professional - with the latter providing in excess of 600 lux on illumination. The towers are in excess of 40m tall with 16 bulbs affixed to each tower.

== Other uses ==
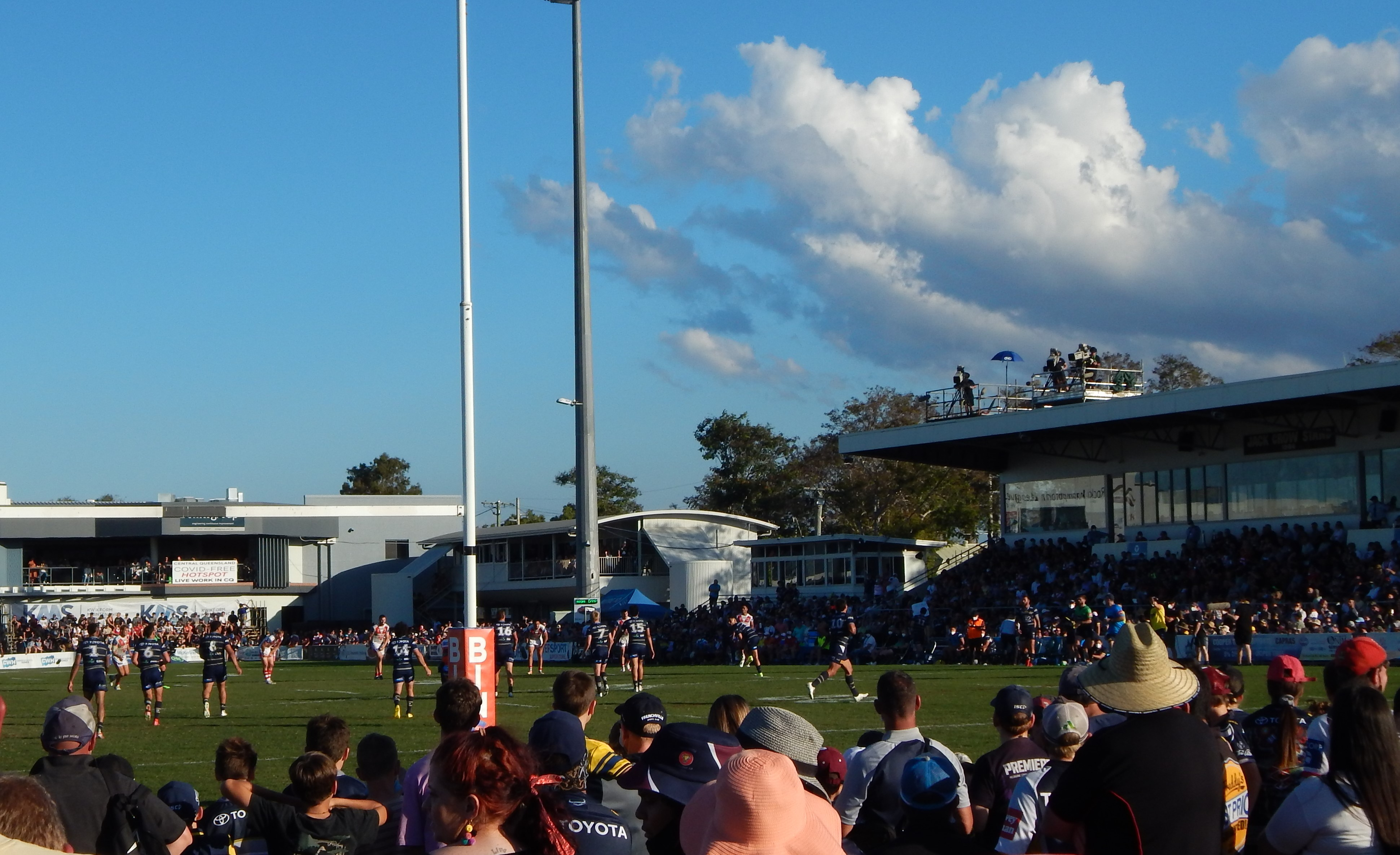
The crowd at Browne Park during the Round 24 NRL game between the St. George Illawarra Dragons and the North Queensland Cowboys on 28 August 2021

Browne Park is also host to all forms of rugby league ranging from juniors and primary schools to the seniors that compete in the domestic Rockhampton competition and the Central Queensland Extended League competition.

Apart from the regular season Rugby League games, Browne Park hosted the Capricorn Cougars Football for the second season in 2007, as well as the Bundaberg Rum Bush Fund Legends of League Charity Match in early October 2007.

Browne Park hosted the 7th Place Playoff of the 2008 Rugby League World Cup in November. The test match, in which Tonga beat Scotland, attracted a crowd of almost 6,000. With Centenary Celebrations also set for Rockhampton, Browne Park will likely become a leading regional facility in Australia.

== Accessibility ==
Walking	Pedestrian access: Browne Park is within walking distance of the CBD area of Rockhampton.
Bus	Bus access: Browne Park is close to bus-stops for the following routes: Route 403 inbound. This bus route travels from Rockhampton State High School to Central Queensland University Rockhampton North via city centre and Park Avenue.; Route 403 outbound. This bus route travels from Central Queensland University Rockhampton North to Rockhampton State High School via Park Avenue, city centre, Base Hospital and West Rockhampton.; Route 407 inbound. This bus route travels from Base Hospital to Central Queensland University Rockhampton North via city centre and Park Avenue.; Route 407 outbound. This bus route travels from Central Queensland University Rockhampton North to Base Hospital via Park Avenue, city centre, Rockhampton State High School and West Rockhampton.; Buses runs between every 30 minutes to 2 hours, from 6am - 6pm Monday to Friday and 8am - 1pm on Saturday depending on which route: Browne Park is situated on the bus inbound side of Murray Street.
Car	Parking is available at Browne Park and around the complex, there is no charge for parking.
