= South East Queensland Derby =

Macca’s Local Derby
- Location: South East Queensland
- Teams: Brisbane Broncos; Gold Coast Titans
- First meeting: 13 April 2007
- Latest meeting: Broncos 12 – 18 Titans (25 June 2023)
- Next meeting: TBA (2024)
- Stadiums: Suncorp Stadium; Cbus Super Stadium

Statistics
- Total meetings: 35
- Most wins: Broncos (24)
- Most player appearances: Alex Glenn (23)
- All-time series: Broncos: 24 wins Titans: 11 wins
- Largest victory: Broncos – 54 points (5 August 2017); Titans – 18 points (27 June 2020)

The South East Queensland derby is a rugby league rivalry between NRL clubs the Brisbane Broncos and Gold Coast Titans.

== Head to Head ==
Team	Played	Won	Drawn	Lost	PF	PA	PD
Brisbane Broncos	35	24	0	11	882	565	+317
Gold Coast Titans	35	11	0	24	565	882	-317

This table only includes competitive matches, excluding all pre-season trials

== Results ==
=== NRL Regular Season ===
Scores list home team first

Date	Season	Round	Home team	Away team	Venue	Score	Attendance	Report
Friday, 13 April	2007	5	Gold Coast Titans	Brisbane Broncos	Suncorp Stadium	28 – 16	47,686	
Friday, 6 July	2007	17	Brisbane Broncos	Gold Coast Titans	Suncorp Stadium	19 – 18	48,621	
Friday, 18 April	2008	6	Gold Coast Titans	Brisbane Broncos	Skilled Park	26 – 24	27,176	
Friday, 22 August	2008	24	Brisbane Broncos	Gold Coast Titans	Suncorp Stadium	25 – 21	39,757	
Friday, 15 May	2009	10	Brisbane Broncos	Gold Coast Titans	Suncorp Stadium	32 – 18	43,079	
Friday, 24 July	2009	20	Gold Coast Titans	Brisbane Broncos	Skilled Park	34 – 18	26,336	
Friday, 14 May	2010	10	Brisbane Broncos	Gold Coast Titans	Suncorp Stadium	28 – 6	40,168	
Friday, 16 July	2010	19	Gold Coast Titans	Brisbane Broncos	Skilled Park	10 – 24	26,197	
Friday, 25 March	2011	3	Gold Coast Titans	Brisbane Broncos	Skilled Park	8 – 14	20,226	
Friday, 15 July	2011	19	Brisbane Broncos	Gold Coast Titans	Suncorp Stadium	30 – 10	31,035	
Friday, 27 April	2012	8	Brisbane Broncos	Gold Coast Titans	Suncorp Stadium	26 – 6	30,083	
Friday, 20 July	2012	20	Gold Coast Titans	Brisbane Broncos	Skilled Park	14 – 10	20,067	
Friday, 5 April	2013	5	Gold Coast Titans	Brisbane Broncos	Skilled Park	12 – 32	22,749	
Friday, 17 May	2013	10	Brisbane Broncos	Gold Coast Titans	Suncorp Stadium	32 – 6	34,596	
Friday, 11 April	2014	6	Gold Coast Titans	Brisbane Broncos	Cbus Super Stadium	12 – 8	20,524	
Friday, 16 May	2014	10	Brisbane Broncos	Gold Coast Titans	Suncorp Stadium	22 – 8	31,380	
Friday, 3 April	2015	5	Gold Coast Titans	Brisbane Broncos	Cbus Super Stadium	16 – 26	15,432	
Friday, 24 July	2015	20	Brisbane Broncos	Gold Coast Titans	Suncorp Stadium	16 – 26	27,664	
Friday, 1 April	2016	5	Gold Coast Titans	Brisbane Broncos	Cbus Super Stadium	4 – 10	21,080	
Friday, 14 April	2017	7	Brisbane Broncos	Gold Coast Titans	Suncorp Stadium	24 – 22	34,592	
Saturday, 5 August	2017	22	Gold Coast Titans	Brisbane Broncos	Cbus Super Stadium	0 – 54	21,716	
Sunday, 1 April	2018	4	Brisbane Broncos	Gold Coast Titans	Suncorp Stadium	14 – 26	30,742	
Sunday, 8 July	2018	17	Gold Coast Titans	Brisbane Broncos	Cbus Super Stadium	0 – 34	18,005	
Sunday, 9 June	2019	13	Brisbane Broncos	Gold Coast Titans	Suncorp Stadium	18 – 26	30,048	
Saturday, 27 July	2019	19	Gold Coast Titans	Brisbane Broncos	Cbus Super Stadium	12 – 34	16,201	
Saturday, 27 June	2020	7	Brisbane Broncos	Gold Coast Titans	Suncorp Stadium	12 – 30	6,262	
Saturday, 12 September	2020	18	Gold Coast Titans	Brisbane Broncos	Cbus Super Stadium	18 – 6	9,729	
Friday, 19 March	2021	2	Gold Coast Titans	Brisbane Broncos	Cbus Super Stadium	28 – 16	17,822	
Friday, 30 April	2021	8	Brisbane Broncos	Gold Coast Titans	Suncorp Stadium	36 – 28	21,322	
Friday, 27 May	2022	12	Brisbane Broncos	Gold Coast Titans	Suncorp Stadium	35 – 24	32,864	
Saturday, 16 July	2022	18	Gold Coast Titans	Brisbane Broncos	Cbus Super Stadium	12 – 16	19,245	
Saturday, 15 April	2023	7	Gold Coast Titans	Brisbane Broncos	Cbus Super Stadium	26 – 43	26,563	
Sunday, 25 June	2023	17	Brisbane Broncos	Gold Coast Titans	Suncorp Stadium	12 – 18	42,249	
Sunday, 27 May	2024	12	Brisbane Broncos	Gold Coast Titans	Suncorp Stadium	34–36	42,212	
Saturday, 3 August	2024	22	Gold Coast Titans	Brisbane Broncos	Cbus Super Stadium	46–18	25,278	

=== NRL Final Games ===
Scores list home team first

Date	Season	Round	Home team	Away team	Venue	Score	Attendance	Report
Saturday, 12 September	2009	QF	Gold Coast Titans	Brisbane Broncos	Skilled Park	32 – 40	27,227	
Friday, 14 April	2016	QF	Brisbane Broncos	Gold Coast Titans	Suncorp Stadium	44 – 28	43,170	

=== NRL Pre-Season Challenge ===
Scores list home team first

Date	Season	Home team	Away team	Venue	Score	Attendance	Report
Saturday, 29 February	2020	Brisbane Broncos	Gold Coast Titans	Moreton Daily Stadium	22 – 28	N/A	
Saturday, 19 February	2022	Gold Coast Titans	Brisbane Broncos	Cbus Super Stadium	26 – 26	4,919	
Sunday, 12 February	2023	Brisbane Broncos	Gold Coast Titans	Sunshine Coast Stadium	24 – 24	4,605	

=== Non-competitive meetings ===
Scores list home team first

Date	Season	Round	Home team	Away team	Venue	Score	Attendance	Report
Saturday, 14 February	2009	Trial	Brisbane Broncos	Gold Coast Titans	Kougari Oval	24 – 18	3,500	
Saturday, 12 February	2011	Trial	Brisbane Broncos	Gold Coast Titans	Kougari Oval	42 – 18	3,500	
Saturday, 11 February	2012	Trial	Gold Coast Titans	Brisbane Broncos	Pizzey Park	18 – 16	7,252	
Saturday, 16 February	2013	Trial	Brisbane Broncos	Gold Coast Titans	Dolphin Oval	14 – 16	4,510	

== Statistics ==
=== Most appearances ===
==== Brisbane Broncos ====
Player	Team	Games
Alex Glenn	Brisbane Broncos	23
Corey Parker	Brisbane Broncos	19
Andrew McCullough	Brisbane Broncos	18
Sam Thaiday	Brisbane Broncos	16
Justin Hodges	Brisbane Broncos	14
Darius Boyd	Brisbane Broncos	13
Matt Gillett	Brisbane Broncos	13
Anthony Milford	Brisbane Broncos	13
Corey Oates	Brisbane Broncos	13
Peter Wallace	Brisbane Broncos	12

==== Gold Coast Titans ====
Player	Team	Games
David Mead	Gold Coast Titans	15
Anthony Don	Gold Coast Titans	14
Mark Minichello	Gold Coast Titans	13
Scott Prince	Gold Coast Titans	13
Greg Bird	Gold Coast Titans	12
Ashley Harrison	Gold Coast Titans	12
Luke Bailey	Gold Coast Titans	11
Kevin Gordon	Gold Coast Titans	11
William Zillman	Gold Coast Titans	11
Ash Taylor	Gold Coast Titans	10

=== Top Point Scorers ===
==== Brisbane Broncos ====
Player	Tries	Goals	FG	Points
Corey Parker	1	56	0	116
Jamayne Isaako	3	26	0	64
Jordan Kahu	3	19	0	50
Israel Folau	9	0	0	36
Anthony Milford	7	1	0	30
Ben Hunt	6	2	0	28
Kodi Nikorima	7	0	0	28
Kotoni Staggs	4	6	0	28
Adam Reynolds	1	11	1	27
Darius Boyd	6	0	0	24
Alex Glenn	6	0	0	24
Corey Oates	6	0	0	24

==== Gold Coast Titans ====
Player	Tries	Goals	FG	Points
Scott Prince	2	27	1	63
David Mead	9	0	0	36
Anthony Don	8	0	0	32
Ash Taylor	1	13	0	30
Tyrone Roberts	1	10	0	24
Tanah Boyd	1	9	0	20
Phillip Sami	5	0	0	20
Preston Campbell	2	4	0	16
David Fifita	4	0	0	16
Jamal Fogarty	0	8	0	16
Kevin Gordon	4	0	0	16
Aidan Sezer	1	6	0	16

==== Most points in a single game ====
- For Brisbane Broncos: 16
  - Israel Folau (4 Tries), Brisbane Broncos 32 – 18 Gold Coast Titans, Round 10, 2009
- For Gold Coast Titans: 14
  - Scott Prince (1 Try, 5 Goals), Gold Coast Titans 34 – 18 Brisbane Broncos, Round 20, 2009

=== Top Try Scorers ===
Player	Team	Tries
Israel Folau	Brisbane Broncos	9
David Mead	Gold Coast Titans	9
Anthony Don	Gold Coast Titans	8
Anthony Milford	Brisbane Broncos	7
Kodi Nikorima	Brisbane Broncos	7
Alex Glenn	Brisbane Broncos	6
Darius Boyd	Brisbane Broncos	6
Corey Oates	Brisbane Broncos	6

==== Most tries in a single game ====
- For Brisbane Broncos: 4
  - Israel Folau (4 Tries), Brisbane Broncos 32 – 18 Gold Coast Titans, Round 10, 2009
- For Gold Coast Titans: 3
  - Matthew Petersen (3 Tries), Gold Coast Titans 26 – 24 Brisbane Broncos, Round 6, 2008

=== Attendances ===
==== Highest attendance ====
- Brisbane Broncos at home: 48,621 – Brisbane Broncos 19 – 18 Gold Coast Titans, Round 17, 2007
- Gold Coast Titans at home: 47,686 – Gold Coast Titans 28 – 16 Brisbane Broncos, Round 5, 2007

=== Lowest attendance ===
- Brisbane Broncos at home: 6,262 – Brisbane Broncos 0 – 22 Gold Coast Titans, Round 7, 2020 (due to COVID-19 pandemic)
- Gold Coast Titans at home: 9,729 – Gold Coast Titans 12 – 6 Brisbane Broncos, Round 18, 2020 (due to COVID-19 pandemic)

== Shared player history ==
Player	Brisbane Broncos career						Gold Coast Titans career					
Player	Span	Games	Tries	Goals	FG	Points	Span	Games	Tries	Goals	FG	Points
Jai Arrow	2016-17	24	1	0	0	4	2018-20	56	4	0	0	16
Jesse Arthars	2020-21, 2023-	30	13	2	0	56	2019	12	2	0	0	8
Luke Capewell	2012	5	1	0	0	4	2011	7	1	0	0	4
Dale Copley	2009-15, 2021	75	32	0	0	128	2017-20	57	20	0	0	80
David Fifita	2018-20	44	13	0	0	52	2021 -	22	17	0	0	68
Nathan Friend	2002	1	0	0	0	0	2007-11, 2016	121	7	0	0	28
Ashley Harrison	2000-02	52	16	0	0	64	2008-14	117	12	0	0	48
Josh Hoffman	2008-14	109	33	0	0	132	2015-16	49	14	0	0	56
Kris Kahler	2002	1	0	0	0	0	2007	15	0	0	0	0
Albert Kelly	2021-	9	3	0	0	12	2013-14	33	16	0	0	64
David Mead	2017, 2021	24	8	0	0	32	2009-16	147	67	0	0	268
Brad Meyers	2000-04	102	7	0	0	28	2007-11	75	11	0	0	44
Steve Michaels	2005-10	59	22	0	0	88	2010-14	60	23	0	0	92
Jonus Pearson	2016-18	11	4	0	0	0	2020-21	2	0	0	0	0
James Roberts	2016-19	79	40	0	0	160	2014-15	36	21	1	0	86
Tyrone Roberts	2022	2	0	0	0	0	2016-17, 2019-20	59	14	82	0	220
Scott Prince	2001-03, 2013	50	8	59	0	150	2007-12	124	32	293	5	719
Ash Taylor	2015	1	0	0	0	0	2016-21	114	18	130	3	335
Dave Taylor	2006-09	49	9	0	0	36	2013-15	58	15	0	0	60
Chris Walker	1999-02	67	40	0	0	160	2007-09	20	10	3	0	46
Jarrod Wallace	2012-16	73	5	0	0	20	2017-22	104	12	0	0	48
Jamayne Isaako	2017-22	77	24	217	2	532	2022	11	3	15	0	42

== See also ==
- Rivalries in the National Rugby League
