= 2009 NRL season results =

The 2009 National Rugby League season consisted of 26 weekly regular season rounds, starting on 13 March and ending on 6 September, followed by four weeks of play-offs which culminated in the grand final on 4 October.

== Regular season ==
=== Round 1 ===
- Steve Price (New Zealand Warriors) played his 300th game in top grade rugby league in Australia.
- Hazem El Masri (Bulldogs) overtook Andrew Johns as the highest-scoring player in top grade rugby league in Australia.
- The Rabbitohs scored 50 or more for the first time since Round 17 1992 ending a 332-game drought, it was also the highest Round 1 score since 2002.
- Golden Point was used for the first time in the Dragons-Melbourne game with a Greg Inglis field goal proving the difference.

Home	Score	Away	Match Information
Home	Score	Away	Date and Time (Local)	Venue	Referees	Crowd
Melbourne Storm	17–16	St George Illawarra Dragons	13 March 2009, 7:35 pm	Olympic Park Stadium	Shayne Hayne; Gavin Badger	14,870
Brisbane Broncos	19–18	North Queensland Cowboys	13 March 2009, 7:35 pm	Suncorp Stadium	Jared Maxwell; Tony De Las Heras	45,022
New Zealand Warriors	26–18	Parramatta Eels	14 March 2009, 5:30 pm	Mt Smart Stadium	Ashley Klein; Alan Shortall	17,447
Cronulla Sharks	18–10	Penrith Panthers	14 March 2009, 7:30 pm	Toyota Stadium	Jason Robinson; Phil Haines	10,617
Bulldogs	34–12	Manly-Warringah Sea Eagles	14 March 2009, 8:30 pm	ANZ Stadium	Ben Cummins; Brett Suttor	19,791
Gold Coast Titans	34–20	Newcastle Knights	15 March 2009, 1:00 pm	Skilled Park	M Cecchin; Chris James	16,203
Sydney Roosters	12–52	South Sydney Rabbitohs	15 March 2009, 3:00 pm	Sydney Football Stadium	Tony De Las Heras; Steve Lyons	24,486
Wests Tigers	34–26	Canberra Raiders	16 March 2009, 7:00 pm	Campbelltown Stadium	Jared Maxwell; Gerard Sutton	17,392
Source: "NRL 2009 Round 1". Rugby League Project.

=== Round 2 ===
- The Bulldogs had their two competition points stripped as they breached NRL match rules by fielding 14 players during the scoring of the match-winning try.

Home	Score	Away	Match Information
Home	Score	Away	Date and Time (Local)	Venue	Referees	Crowd
South Sydney Rabbitohs	8–14	Parramatta Eels	20 March 2009, 7:35 pm	ANZ Stadium	Shayne Hayne; Gavin Badger	20,871
Brisbane Broncos	16–14	Melbourne Storm	20 March 2009, 7:35 pm	Suncorp Stadium	Ben Cummins; Tony De Las Heras	36,647
St George Illawarra Dragons	16–10	Gold Coast Titans	21 March 2009, 5:30 pm	WIN Stadium	Ashley Klien; Alan Shortall	13,329
Penrith Panthers	26–28	Bulldogs	21 March 2009, 7:30 pm	CUA Stadium	Matt Cecchin; Chris James	16,846
North Queensland Cowboys	42–14	Wests Tigers	21 March 2009, 8:30 pm	Dairy Farmers Stadium	Jason Robinson; Phil Haines	19,879
Canberra Raiders	4–28	Sydney Roosters	22 March 2009, 2:00 pm	Canberra Stadium	Jared Maxwell; Gerard Sutton	13,100
Manly-Warringah Sea Eagles	24–26	New Zealand Warriors	22 March 2009, 3:00 pm	Brookvale Oval	Shayne Hayne; Gavin Badger	16,307
Cronulla Sharks	12–24	Newcastle Knights	23 March 2009, 7:00 pm	Toyota Stadium	Ben Cummins; Brett Suttor	11,148
Source: "NRL 2009 Round 2". Rugby League Project.

=== Round 3 ===
Home	Score	Away	Match Information
Home	Score	Away	Date and Time (Local)	Venue	Referees	Crowd
Wests Tigers	40–24	Sydney Roosters	27 March 2009, 7:35 pm	Sydney Football Stadium	Tony Archer; Gavin Badger	14,426
Gold Coast Titans	20–12	Bulldogs	27 March 2009, 7:35 pm	Skilled Park	Jared Maxwell; Alan Shortall	19,854
New Zealand Warriors	10–26	Brisbane Broncos	28 March 2009, 7:30 pm	Mt Smart Stadium	Jason Robinson; Matt Cecchin	24,538
Parramatta Eels	18–16	Canberra Raiders	28 March 2009, 7:30 pm	Parramatta Stadium	Steve Lyons; Chris James	11,110
North Queensland Cowboys	12–26	Melbourne Storm	28 March 2009, 8:30 pm	Dairy Farmers Stadium	Shayne Hayne; Gerard Sutton	21,489
South Sydney Rabbitohs	22–12	Newcastle Knights	29 March 2009, 2:00 pm	Bluetongue Stadium	Ashley Klien; Brett Suttor	15,227
St George Illawarra Dragons	10–6	Cronulla Sharks	29 March 2009, 3:00 pm	WIN Jubilee Oval	Gavin Badger; Tony De Las Heras	20,847
Manly-Warringah Sea Eagles	10–12	Penrith Panthers	30 March 2009, 7:00 pm	Brookvale Oval	Ben Cummins; Phil Hains	8,667
Source: "NRL 2009 Round 3". Rugby League Project.

=== Round 4 ===
Home	Score	Away	Match Information
Home	Score	Away	Date and Time (Local)	Venue	Referee	Crowd
Brisbane Broncos	12–25	St George Illawarra Dragons	3 April 2009, 6:35 pm	Suncorp Stadium	Matt Cecchin; Shayne Hayne	42,435
Sydney Roosters	24–6	Parramatta Eels	3 April 2009, 7:35 pm	Sydney Football Stadium	Tony Archer; Steve Lyons	11,231
Penrith Panthers	42–22	Wests Tigers	4 April 2009, 5:30 pm	CUA Stadium	Ben Cummins; Phil Haines	15,813
Melbourne Storm	6–18	Gold Coast Titans	4 April 2009, 7:30 pm	Olympic Park Stadium	Ashley Klein; Brett Suttor	11,698
New Zealand Warriors	16–22	South Sydney Rabbitohs	5 April 2009, 2:00 pm	Mt Smart Stadium	Gavin Badger; Tony De Las Heras	19,386
Bulldogs	24–12	Cronulla Sharks	5 April 2009, 2:00 pm	ANZ Stadium	Jason Robinson; Gerard Sutton	15,520
Newcastle Knights	26–12	Manly-Warringah Sea Eagles	5 April 2009, 3:00 pm	Energy Australia Stadium	Jared Maxwell; Alan Shortall	15,324
Canberra Raiders	23–18	North Queensland Cowboys	6 April 2009, 7:00 pm	Canberra Stadium	Tony Archer; Steve Lyons	12,193
Source: "NRL 2009 Round 4". Rugby League Project. Archived from the original on 20 May 2009.

=== Round 5 ===
Home	Score	Away	Match Information
Home	Score	Away	Date and Time (Local)	Venue	Referee	Crowd
Sydney Roosters	24–28	Brisbane Broncos	10 April 2009, 7:35 pm	Sydney Football Stadium	Gavin Badger; Matt Cecchin	18,464
Parramatta Eels	8–22	St George Illawarra Dragons	10 April 2009, 7:35 pm	Parramatta Stadium	Ashley Klein; Brett Suttor	19,017
Cronulla Sharks	14–24	Canberra Raiders	11 April 2009, 5:30 pm	Toyota Stadium	Ben Cummins; Alan Shortall	8,561
Melbourne Storm	16–14	Penrith Panthers	11 April 2009, 7:30 pm	Olympic Park Stadium	Tony Archer; Chris James	10,110
North Queensland Cowboys	10–14	Gold Coast Titans	11 April 2009, 7:30 pm	Dairy Farmers Stadium	Phil Haines; Jared Maxwell	18,123
Newcastle Knights	24–22	New Zealand Warriors	12 April 2009, 2:00 pm	Energy Australia Stadium	Gavin Badger; Steve Lyons	13,626
Manly-Warringah Sea Eagles	23–10	Wests Tigers	12 April 2009, 3:00 pm	Brookvale Oval	Tony De Las Heras; Shayne Hayne	17,942
Bulldogs	14–12	South Sydney Rabbitohs	13 April 2009, 7:00 pm	ANZ Stadium	Ashley Klein; Brett Suttor	22,775
Source: "NRL 2009 Round 5". Rugby League Project.

=== Round 6 ===
- Golden Point was used again in the Warriors-Roosters game, with a Stacey Jones field goal proving the difference.

Home	Score	Away	Match Information
Home	Score	Away	Date and Time (Local)	Venue	Referee	Crowd
Penrith Panthers	18–38	Brisbane Broncos	17 April 2009, 7:35pm	CUA Stadium	Tony De Las Heras; Shayne Hayne	14,332
Gold Coast Titans	16–10	Canberra Raiders	17 April 2009, 7:35pm	Skilled Park	Tony Archer; Steve Lyons	18,510
St George Illawarra Dragons	18–24	Newcastle Knights	18 April 2009, 5:30pm	WIN Jubilee Oval	Jason Robinson; Gerard Sutton	14,477
South Sydney Rabbitohs	8–24	Manly-Warringah Sea Eagles	18 April 2009, 7:30pm	ANZ Stadium	Matt Cecchin; Jared Maxwell	14,225
New Zealand Warriors	17–16	Sydney Roosters	19 April 2009, 2:00pm	Mt Smart Stadium	Ben Cummins; Alan Shortall	16,309
Parramatta Eels	18–48	Bulldogs	19 April 2009, 3:00pm	ANZ Stadium	Gavin Badger; Tony De Las Heras	18,223
Cronulla Sharks	10–34	North Queensland Cowboys	19 April 2009, 6:15pm	Hindmarsh Stadium	Chris James; Ashley Klein	8,547
Wests Tigers	16–6	Melbourne Storm	20 April 2009, 7:00pm	Leichhardt Oval	Tony Archer; Shayne Hayne	12,646
Source: "NRL 2009 Round 6". Rugby League Project.

=== Round 7 ===
Home	Score	Away	Match Information
Home	Score	Away	Date and Time (Local)	Venue	Referee	Crowd
Brisbane Broncos	40–8	Parramatta Eels	24 April 2009, 7:35pm	Suncorp Stadium	Jarred Maxwell; Brett Suttor	30,887
South Sydney Rabbitohs	32–26	Cronulla Sharks	24 April 2009, 7:35pm	ANZ Stadium	Ben Cummins; Alan Shortall	11,208
Sydney Roosters	0–29	St George Illawarra Dragons	25 April 2009, 3:00pm	Sydney Football Stadium	Shayne Hayne; Tony De Las Haras	28,926
Melbourne Storm	14–14	New Zealand Warriors	25 April 2009, 5:30pm	Olympic Park Stadium	Tony Archer; Matt Cecchin	15,200
North Queensland Cowboys	26–12	Manly-Warringah Sea Eagles	25 April 2009, 7:30pm	Dairy Farmers Stadium	Gavin Badger; Steve Lyons	16,153
Canberra Raiders	20–30	Bulldogs	26 April 2009, 2:00pm	Canberra Stadium	Chris James; Ashley Klein	10,241
Wests Tigers	26–24	Newcastle Knights	26 April 2009, 3:00pm	Campbelltown Stadium	Jason Robinson; Gerard Sutton	17,898
Penrith Panthers	34–20	Gold Coast Titans	27 April 2009, 7:00pm	CUA Stadium	Ben Cummins; Jared Maxwell	9,760
Source: "NRL 2009 Round 7". Rugby League Project.

=== Round 8 ===
- Darren Lockyer (Brisbane Broncos) played his 300th game in top grade rugby league in Australia.

Home	Score	Away	Match Information
Home	Score	Away	Date and Time (Local)	Venue	Referee	Crowd
Manly-Warringah Sea Eagles	8–22	Melbourne Storm	1 May 2009, 7:35pm	Brookvale Oval	Tony De Las Heras; Shayne Hayne	10,752
Parramatta Eels	28–18	North Queensland Cowboys	1 May 2009, 7:35pm	Parramatta Stadium	Jason Robinson; Gerard Sutton	8,104
Gold Coast Titans	22–14	South Sydney Rabbitohs	2 May 2009, 3:00pm	Skilled Park	Chris James; Ashley Klein	19,833
Cronulla Sharks	12–19	Sydney Roosters	2 May 2009, 5:30pm	Toyota Stadium	Gavin Badger; Matt Cecchin	9,879
Newcastle Knights	28–12	Brisbane Broncos	2 May 2009, 7:30pm	Energy Australia Stadium	Tony Archer; Phil Haines	18,154
Canberra Raiders	10–18	Penrith Panthers	2 May 2009, 7:30pm	Canberra Stadium	Steve Lyons; Brett Suttor	8,850
St George Illawarra Dragons	12–11	New Zealand Warriors	3 May 2009, 2:00pm	WIN Stadium	Ben Cummins; Jason Robinson	14,562
Bulldogs	22–20	Wests Tigers	3 May 2009, 3:00pm	ANZ Stadium	Tony De Las Heras; Jared Maxwell	25,622
Source: "NRL 2009 Round 8". Rugby League Project.

=== Round 9 ===
- 2 representative matches were played during this round, City vs Country Origin and the Australia vs New Zealand test match.

Home	Score	Away	Match Information
Home	Score	Away	Date and Time	Venue	Referee	Crowd
North Queensland Cowboys	24–20	St George Illawarra Dragons	9 May 2009, 7:30pm	Dairy Farmers Stadium	Ashley Klein; Brett Suttor	16,031
Newcastle Knights	23–18	Gold Coast Titans	10 May 2009, 2:00pm	Energy Australia Stadium	Ben Cummins; Steve Lyons	11,258
Brisbane Broncos	20–22	Manly-Warringah Sea Eagles	10 May 2009, 3:00pm	Suncorp Stadium	Tony Archer; Matt Cecchin	27,527
Sydney Roosters	12-28	Melbourne Storm	11 May 2009, 7:00pm	Bluetongue Stadium	Tony De Las Heras; Jason Robinson	8,412
BYE Round for: 8 teams - Bulldogs, Canberra Raiders, Cronulla Sharks, New Zealand Warriors, Parramatta Eels, Penrith Panthers, South Sydney Rabbitohs and Wests Tigers.
Source: "NRL 2009 Round 9". Rugby League Project.

=== Round 10: Heritage Round ===
Home	Score	Away	Match Information
Home	Score	Away	Date and Time (Local)	Venue	Referees	Crowd
Brisbane Broncos	32–18	Gold Coast Titans	15 May 2009, 7:35pm	Suncorp Stadium	Gavin Badger; Shane Hayne	43,079
St George Illawarra Dragons	20–18	Bulldogs	15 May 2009, 7:35pm	WIN Jubilee Oval	Tony Archer; Ashley Klein	18,415
Sydney Roosters	6–38	Newcastle Knights	16 May 2009, 5:30pm	Sydney Football Stadium	Chris James; Steve Lyons	8,611
Penrith Panthers	26–22	Cronulla Sharks	16 May 2009, 7:30pm	CUA Stadium	Jared Maxwell; Gerard Sutton	11,750
New Zealand Warriors	12–34	North Queensland Cowboys	17 May 2009, 12:00pm	Mt Smart Stadium	Ben Cummins; Alan Shortall	16,345
Manly-Warringah Sea Eagles	34–10	Parramatta Eels	17 May 2009, 2:00pm	Brookvale Oval	Gavin Badger; Tony De Las Heras	15,916
Wests Tigers	22–23	South Sydney Rabbitohs	17 May 2009, 3:00pm	Sydney Cricket Ground	Ashley Klein; Jason Robinson	29,970
Melbourne Storm	46–6	Canberra Raiders	18 May 2009, 7:00pm	Olympic Park Stadium	Tony Archer; Brett Suttor	10,112
Source: "NRL 2009 Round 10". Rugby League Project.

=== Round 11 ===
Home	Score	Away	Match Information
Home	Score	Away	Date and Time (Local)	Venue	Referee	Crowd
Parramatta Eels	16-16	South Sydney Rabbitohs	22 May 2009, 7:35pm	ANZ Stadium	Gavin Badger; Brett Suttor	10,670
Wests Tigers	18-20	Brisbane Broncos	22 May 2009, 7:35pm	Campbelltown Stadium	Ben Cummins; Jared Maxwell	9,675
Cronulla Sharks	4-26	St George Illawarra Dragons	23 May 2009, 5:30pm	Toyota Stadium	Tony De Las Heras; Jason Robinson	15,201
Bulldogs	26-10	Melbourne Storm	23 May 2009, 7:30pm	Bluetongue Stadium	Shayne Hayne; Gerard Sutton	10,923
Penrith Panthers	48-6	Sydney Roosters	23 May 2009, 7:30pm	CUA Stadium	Ashley Klein; Steve Lyons	8,515
Canberra Raiders	38-12	New Zealand Warriors	24 May 2009, 2:00pm	Canberra Stadium	Jared Maxell; Bernard Sutton	8,383
Gold Coast Titans	18-17	Manly-Warringah Sea Eagles	24 May 2009, 3:00pm	Skilled Park	Tony Archer; Matt Cecchin	16,126
North Queensland Cowboys	36-10	Newcastle Knights	25 May 2009, 7:00pm	Dairy Farmers Stadium	Ben Cummins; Alan Shortall	11,892
Source: "NRL 2009 Round 11". Rugby League Project.

=== Round 12 ===
Home	Score	Away	Match Information
Home	Score	Away	Date and Time (Local)	Venue	Referee	Crowd
St George Illawarra Dragons	38-10	Penrith Panthers	29 May 2009, 7;35pm	WIN Stadium	Steve Lyons; Jason Robinson	10,623
Parramatta Eels	10-13	Cronulla Sharks	30 May 2009, 7:30pm	Parramatta Stadium	Ben Cummins; Alan Shortall	7,014
Newcastle Knights	22-14	Bulldogs	31 May 2009, 3:00pm	Energy Australia Stadium	Tony De Las Heras; Jason Robinson	18,322
New Zealand Warriors	14-0	Wests Tigers	31 May 2009, 4:00pm	Mt Smart Stadium	Gavin Badger; Brett Suttor	15,365
South Sydney Rabbitohs	18-34	Canberra Raiders	1 June 2009, 7:00pm	ANZ Stadium	Ashley Klein; Steve Lyons	9,805
BYE Round for: 6 teams - Brisbane Broncos, Gold Coast Titans, Manly-Warringah Sea Eagles, Melbourne Storm, North Queensland Cowboys and Sydney Roosters.
Source: "NRL 2009 Round 12". Rugby League Project.

=== Round 13 ===
Home	Score	Away	Match Information
Home	Score	Away	Date and Time (Local)	Venue	Referee	Crowd
Wests Tigers	10-26	Penrith Panthers	5 June 2009, 7:35pm	Leichhardt Oval	Jason Robinson; Bernard Sutton	14,100
Melbourne Storm	48-4	Brisbane Broncos	5 June 2009, 7:35pm	Olympic Park Stadium	Gavin Badger; Ben Cummins	15,318
Manly-Warringah Sea Eagles	38-18	Sydney Roosters	6 June 2009, 5:30pm	Brookvale Oval	Steve Lyons; Ashley Klein	10,549
North Queensland Cowboys	46-12	South Sydney Rabbitohs	6 June 2009, 7:30pm	Dairy Farmers Stadium	Shayne Hayne; Gerard Sutton	16,568
Cronulla Sharks	18-10	New Zealand Warriors	7 June 2009, 2:00pm	Toyota Stadium	Tony Archer; Matt Cecchin	14,082
Newcastle Knights	18-20	Parramatta Eels	7 June 2009, 3:00pm	Energy Australia Stadium	Gavin Badger; Brett Suttor	18,085
Gold Coast Titans	28-24	St George Illawarra Dragons	8 June 2009, 7:00pm	Skilled Park	Ben Cummins; Alan Shortall	24,106
BYE Round for: 2 teams - Bulldogs & Canberra Raiders.
Source: "NRL 2009 Round 13". Rugby League Project.

=== Round 14 ===
Home	Score	Away	Match Information
Home	Score	Away	Date and Time (Local)	Venue	Referee	Crowd
Brisbane Broncos	22-44	Bulldogs	12 June 2009, 7:35pm	Suncorp Stadium	Tony Archer; Shayne Hayne	26,353
New Zealand Warriors	13-0	Newcastle Knights	12 June 2009, 8:35pm	Mt Smart Stadium	Steve Lyons; Bernard Sutton	14,255
Sydney Roosters	20-24	Gold Coast Titans	13 June 2009, 5:30pm	Bluetongue Stadium	Ben Cummins; Ben Shortall	6,232
Penrith Panthers	6-20	Manly-Warringah Sea Eagles	13 June 2009, 7:30pm	CUA Stadium	Jason Robinson; Tony De Las Heras	15,806
South Sydney Rabbitohs	22-28	Melbourne Storm	13 June 2009, 7:30pm	Members Equity Stadium	Ashley Klein; Chris James	15,197
Canberra Raiders	22-24	Cronulla Sharks	14 June 2009, 2:00pm	Canberra Stadium	Shayne Hayne; Gerard Sutton	10,104
St George Illawarra Dragons	32-18	North Queensland Cowboys	14 June 2009, 3:00pm	WIN Stadium	Tony Archer; Matt Cecchin	11,374
Parramatta Eels	6-23	Wests Tigers	15 June 2009, 7:00pm	Parramatta Stadium	Ben Cummins; Brett Suttor	12,003
Source: "NRL 2009 Round 14". Rugby League Project.

=== Round 15 ===
Home	Score	Away	Match Information
Home	Score	Away	Date and Time (Local)	Venue	Referee	Crowd
Bulldogs	19–12	Penrith Panthers	19 June 2009, 7:35pm	ANZ Stadium	Gavin Badger; Matt Cecchin	13,992
North Queensland Cowboys	24–22	Sydney Roosters	20 June 2009, 7:30pm	Dairy Farmers Stadium	Jason Robinson; Tony De Las Heras	13,486
Melbourne Storm	14–12	Wests Tigers	21 June 2009, 2:00pm	Olympic Park Stadium	Steve Lyons; Ashley Klien	10,417
Manly-Warringah Sea Eagles	20–14	Canberra Raiders	21 June 2009, 3:00pm	Brookvale Oval	Jared Maxwell; Bernard Sutton	8,182
Cronulla Sharks	46–12	Brisbane Broncos	22 June 2009, 7:00pm	Toyota Stadium	Gavin Badger; Brett Suttor	8,117
BYE Round for: 6 teams - Gold Coast Titans, Newcastle Knights, New Zealand Warriors, Parramatta Eels, St George Illawarra Dragons and South Sydney Rabbitohs.
Source: "NRL 2009 Round 15". Rugby League Project.

=== Round 16 ===
Home	Score	Away	Match Information
Home	Score	Away	Date and Time (Local)	Venue	Referee	Crowd
Bulldogs	30–18	North Queensland Cowboys	26 June 2009, 7:35pm	ANZ Stadium	Jared Maxwell; Bernard Sutton	13,461
Wests Tigers	10–21	St George Illawarra Dragons	26 June 2009, 7:35pm	Sydney Football Stadium	Tony De Las Heras; Jason Robinson	15,211
Gold Coast Titans	28–12	New Zealand Warriors	27 June 2009, 5:30pm	Skilled Park	Alan Shortall; Ben Cummins	20,031
Sydney Roosters	19–12	Cronulla Sharks	27 June 2009, 7:30pm	Sydney Football Stadium	Chris James; Ashley Klein	7,472
Canberra Raiders	26–16	Melbourne Storm	28 June 2009, 2:00pm	Canberra Stadium	Gavin Badger; Brett Suttor	9,551
Parramatta Eels	21–14	Brisbane Broncos	28 June 2009, 3:00pm	Parramatta Stadium	Tony Archer; Matt Cecchin	10,030
Newcastle Knights	25–20	South Sydney Rabbitohs	29 June 2009, 7:00pm	Energy Australia Stadium	Shayne Hayne; Gerard Sutton	14,204
BYE Round for: 2 Teams - Manly-Warringah Sea Eagles and Penrith Panthers.
Source: "NRL 2009 Round 16". Rugby League Project.

=== Round 17 ===
Home	Score	Away	Match Information
Home	Score	Away	Date and Time (Local)	Venue	Referees	Crowd
Brisbane Broncos	28-14	New Zealand Warriors	3 July 2009, 7:35pm	Suncorp Stadium	Jared Maxwell; Bernard Sutton	32,456
St George Illawarra Dragons	34-12	Sydney Roosters	3 July 2009, 7:35pm	WIN Jubilee Oval	Tony Archer; Tony De Las Heras	12,472
South Sydney Rabbitohs	20-54	Wests Tigers	4 July 2009, 5:30pm	ANZ Stadium	Steve Lyons; Alan Shortall	14,856
Melbourne Storm	18-14	Newcastle Knights	4 July 2009, 7:30pm	Olympic Park Stadium	Matt Cecchin; Shayne Hayne	9,041
North Queensland Cowboys	24-4	Cronulla Sharks	4 July 2009, 7:30pm	Dairy Farmers Stadium	Ben Cummins; Brett Suttor	17,283
Canberra Raiders	34-28	Gold Coast Titans	5 July 2009, 2:00pm	Canberra Stadium	Gavin Badger; Chris James	9,800
Penrith Panthers	38-34	Parramatta Eels	5 July 2009, 3:00pm	CUA Stadium	Jason Robinson; Gerard Sutton	16,845
Manly-Warringah Sea Eagles	19-12	Bulldogs	6 July 2009, 7:00pm	Brookvale Oval	Tony Archer; Jared Maxwell	15,501
Source: "NRL 2009 Round 17". Rugby League Project.

=== Round 18 ===
Home	Score	Away	Match Information
Home	Score	Away	Date and Time (Local)	Venue	Referee	Crowd
South Sydney Rabbitohs	36-12	Penrith Panthers	10 July 2009, 7:35pm	ANZ Stadium	Ben Cummins; Tony De Las Heras	9,017
Newcastle Knights	23-4	Canberra Raiders	11 July 2009, 7:30pm	Energy Australia Stadium	Jared Maxwell; Bernard Sutton	15,355
St George Illawarra Dragons	48-18	Manly-Warringah Sea Eagles	12 July 2009, 3:00pm	WIN Stadium	Ashley Klein; Gavin Badger	16,792
New Zealand Warriors	14-18	Bulldogs	12 July 2009, 4:00pm	Mt Smart Stadium	Jason Robinson; Gerard Sutton	11,802
Gold Coast Titans	18-12	Parramatta Eels	13 July 2009, 7:00pm	Skilled Park	Matt Cecchin; Steve Lyons	14,840
BYE Round for: 6 teams - Brisbane Broncos, Cronulla Sharks, Melbourne Storm, North Queensland Cowboys, Sydney Roosters & Wests Tigers.
Source: "NRL 2009 Round 18". Rugby League Project.

=== Round 19 ===
Home	Score	Away	Match Information
Home	Score	Away	Date and Time (Local)	Venue	Referee	Crowd
Brisbane Broncos	12–44	South Sydney Rabbitohs	17 July 2009, 6:40pm	Suncorp Stadium	Gavin Badger; Tony De Las Heras, Phil Haines.	50,109
Bulldogs	23–16	Gold Coast Titans	17 July 2009, 8:30pm	Suncorp Stadium	Ben Cuummins; Jared Maxwell	50,109
Penrith Panthers	27–14	Canberra Raiders	18 July 2009, 5:30pm	CUA Stadium	Json Robinson; Gerard Sutton	8,074
Cronulla Sharks	26–32	Manly-Warringah Sea Eagles	18 July 2009, 7:30pm	Toyota Stadium	Steve Lyons; Alan Shortall	10,114
Sydney Roosters	24–30	New Zealand Warriors	19 July 2009, 2:00pm	Sydney Football Stadium	Brett Suttor; Ben Cummins	8,021
Wests Tigers	34–14	North Queensland Cowboys	19 July 2009, 3:00pm	Leichhardt Oval	Shane Hayne; Matt Cecchin	18,804
Parramatta Eels	18–16	Melbourne Storm	20 July 2009, 7:00pm	Parramatta Stadium	Ashley Klein; Bernard Sutton	10,804
BYE Round for: 2 teams - Newcastle Knights & St George Illawarra Dragons.
Source: "NRL 2009 Round 19". Rugby League Project.

Parramatta forward Nathan Hindmarsh played his 250th First Grade game for the club.

=== Round 20 ===
Home	Score	Away	Match Information
Home	Score	Away	Date and Time (Local)	Venue	Referee	Crowd
Manly-Warringah Sea Eagles	44–20	Newcastle Knights	24 July 2009, 7:35pm	Bluetongue Stadium	Tony Archer; Jason Robinson	15,857
Gold Coast Titans	34–18	Brisbane Broncos	24 July 2009, 7:35pm	Skilled Park	Jared Maxwell; Bernard Sutton	26,336
Bulldogs	8–27	Parramatta Eels	25 July 2009, 5:30pm	ANZ Stadium	Steve Lyons; Alan Shortall	31,664
North Queensland Cowboys	20–28	Penrith Panthers	25 July 2009, 7:30pm	Dairy Farmers Stadium	Shane Hayne; Matt Cecchin	14,274
Melbourne Storm	30–10	Cronulla Sharks	25 July 2009, 7:30pm	Olympic Park Stadium	Ben Cummins; Bernard Sutton	10,533
Canberra Raiders	4–25	Wests Tigers	26 July 2009, 2:00pm	Canberra Stadium	Tony Archer; Phil Haines	11,150
New Zealand Warriors	4–29	St George Illawarra Dragons	26 July 2009, 4:00pm	Mt Smart Stadium	Gavin Badger; Ashley Klien	13,507
South Sydney Rabbitohs	40–20	Sydney Roosters	27 July 2009, 7:00pm	ANZ Stadium	Jason Robinson; Gerard Sutton	11,031
Source: "NRL 2009 Round 20". Rugby League Project.

=== Round 21 ===
- Matt Bowen becomes the first North Queensland Cowboys player to score 100 tries for the club.

Home	Score	Away	Match Information
Home	Score	Away	Date and Time (Local)	Venue	Referees	Crowd
Gold Coast Titans	18–34	North Queensland Cowboys	31 July 2009, 7:35pm	Skilled Park	Tony Archer; Ashley Klein	20,315
St George Illawarra Dragons	26–12	Melbourne Storm	31 July 2009, 7:35pm	WIN Jubilee Oval	Matt Cecchin; Jared Maxwell	16,474
Canberra Raiders	56–0	Brisbane Broncos	1 August 2009, 5:30pm	Canberra Stadium	Jason Robinson; Gerard Sutton	10,200
Newcastle Knights	18–30	Sydney Roosters	1 August 2009, 7:30pm	Energy Australia Stadium	Ben Cummins; Brett Suttor	15,112
Penrith Panthers	32–32	New Zealand Warriors	1 August 2009, 7:30pm	CUA Stadium	Steve Lyons; Alan Shortall	12,677
Cronulla Sharks	0–30	Parramatta Eels	2 August 2009, 2:00pm	Toyota Stadium	Jared Maxwell; Bernard Sutton	12,246
South Sydney Rabbitohs	18–26	Bulldogs	2 August 2009, 3:00pm	ANZ Stadium	Gavin Badger; Asley Klein	24,217
Wests Tigers	19–18	Manly-Warringah Sea Eagles	3 August 2009, 7:00pm	Sydney Football Stadium	Matt Cecchin; Shayne Hayne	13,531
Source: "NRL 2009 Round 21". Rugby League Project.

=== Round 22 ===
Home	Score	Away	Match Information
Home	Score	Away	Date and Time (Local)	Venue	Referee	Crowd
Penrith Panthers	6–25	St George Illawarra Dragons	7 August 2009, 7:35pm	CUA Stadium	Gavin Badger; Ashley Klein	19,987
Melbourne Storm	20–8	North Queensland Cowboys	7 August 2009, 7:35pm	Olympic Park Stadium	Tony Archer; Gerard Sutton	10,510
Manly-Warringah Sea Eagles	22–36	South Sydney Rabbitohs	8 August 2009, 5:30pm	Brookvale Oval	Ben Cummins; Brett Suttor	15,702
Bulldogs	23–20	Canberra Raiders	8 August 2009, 7:30pm	ANZ Stadium	Jared Maxwell; Bernard Sutton	13,310
New Zealand Warriors	10–30	Gold Coast Titans	9 August 2009, 2:00pm	Mt Smart Stadium	Steve Lyons; Alan Shortall	10,205
Sydney Roosters	10–17	Wests Tigers	9 August 2009, 2:00pm	Sydney Football Stadium	Gavin Badger; Tony De Las Heras	16,427
Parramatta Eels	40–8	Newcastle Knights	9 August 2009, 3:00pm	Parramatta Stadium	Shayne Hayne; Matt Cecchin	17,669
Brisbane Broncos	30–10	Cronulla Sharks	10 August 2009, 7:00pm	Suncorp Stadium	Ben Cummins; Phil Haines	20,114
Source: "NRL 2009 Round 22". Rugby League Project.

=== Round 23 ===
Home	Score	Away	Match Information
Home	Score	Away	Date and Time (Local)	Venue	Referee	Crowd
South Sydney Rabbitohs	14–22	Gold Coast Titans	14 August 2009, 7;35pm	ANZ Stadium	Shayne Hayne; Jason Robinson	11,977
North Queensland Cowboys	12–22	Bulldogs	14 August 2009, 7:35pm	Dairy Farmers Stadium	Tony Archer; Gerard Sutton	18,199
Sydney Roosters	12–44	Manly-Warringah Sea Eagles	15 August 2009, 5:30pm	Sydney Football Stadium	Jared Maxwell; Bernard Sutton	9,968
Canberra Raiders	24–12	St George Illawarra Dragons	15 August 2009, 7:30pm	Canberra Stadium	Ben Cummins; Brett Suttor	19,350
Parramatta Eels	40–4	New Zealand Warriors	15 August 2009, 7:30pm	Parramatta Stadium	Gavin Badger; Ashley Klein	12,627
Cronulla Sharks	10–56	Wests Tigers	16 August 2009, 2:00pm	Toyota Stadium	Steve Lyons; Alan Shortall	12,982
Brisbane Broncos	58–24	Penrith Panthers	16 August 2009, 3:00pm	Suncorp Stadium	Matt Cecchin; Shayne Hayne	25,305
Newcastle Knights	26–14	Melbourne Storm	17 August 2009, 7:00pm	Energy Australia Stadium	Phil Haines; Jason Robinson	13,580
Source: "NRL 2009 Round 23". Rugby League Project.

=== Round 24 ===
Home	Score	Away	Match Information
Home	Score	Away	Date and Time (Local)	Venue	Referees	Crowd
Wests Tigers	18–26	Parramatta Eels	21 August 2009, 7:35pm	Sydney Football Stadium	Tony Archer; Jared Maxwell	34,272
St George Illawarra Dragons	2–12	Brisbane Broncos	21 August 2009, 7:35pm	WIN Stadium	Ben Cummins; Shayne Hayne	17,044
Newcastle Knights	32–26	North Queensland Cowboys	22 August 2009, 5:30pm	Energy Australia Stadium	Ashley Klein; Jason Robinson	15,408
Penrith Panthers	40–10	South Sydney Rabbitohs	22 August 2009, 7:30pm	CUA Stadium	Gavin Badger; Bernard Sutton	14,214
New Zealand Warriors	34–20	Canberra Raiders	23 August 2009, 2:00pm	Mt Smart Stadium	Matt Cecchin; Adam Devcich	8,812
Gold Coast Titans	20–10	Cronulla Sharks	23 August 2009, 2:00pm	Skilled Park	Steve Lyons; Gerard Sutton	14,714
Melbourne Storm	16–20	Manly-Warringah Sea Eagles	23 August 2009, 3:00pm	Olympic Park Stadium	Tony Archer; Shayne Hayne	12,601
Bulldogs	28–4	Sydney Roosters	24 August 2009, 7:00pm	ANZ Stadium	Chris James; Jared Maxwell	12,298
Source: "NRL 2009 Round 24". Rugby League Project.

=== Round 25 ===
Home	Score	Away	Match Information
Home	Score	Away	Date and Time (Local)	Venue	Referee	Crowd
Parramatta Eels	48–6	Penrith Panthers	28 August 2009, 7:35pm	Parramatta Stadium	Shane Hayne; Jason Robinson	20,237
North Queensland Cowboys	10–16	Brisbane Broncos	28 August 2009, 7:35pm	Dairy Farmers Stadium	Matt Cecchin; Ben Cummins	24,332
Gold Coast Titans	36–24	Wests Tigers	29 August 2009, 5:30pm	Skilled Park	Tony Archer; Bernard Sutton	20,102
South Sydney Rabbitohs	41–6	St George Illawarra Dragons	29 August 2009, 7:30pm	ANZ Stadium	Ashley Klein; Steve Lyons	19,918
Melbourne Storm	38–4	Sydney Roosters	29 August 2009, 7:30pm	Olympic Park Stadium	Jared Maxwell; Brett Suttor	13,332
Manly-Warringah Sea Eagles	18–16	Cronulla Sharks	30 August 2009, 2:00pm	Brookvale Oval	Jason Robinson; Phil Haines	15,844
Bulldogs	40–20	New Zealand Warriors	30 August 2009, 3:00pm	ANZ Stadium	Gavin Badger; Alan Shortall	41,835
Canberra Raiders	30–14	Newcastle Knights	31 August 2009, 7:00pm	Canberra Stadium	Ashley Klein; Matt Cecchin	9,400
Source: "NRL 2009 Round 25". Rugby League Project.

=== Round 26 ===
Channel Nine had its biggest Friday night TV ratings of the year for the Eels-Dragons game with the audience peaking at 580,000.

Home	Score	Away	Match Information
Home	Score	Away	Date and Time (Local)	Venue	Referees	Crowd
St George Illawarra Dragons	37–0	Parramatta Eels	4 September 2009, 7:45pm	WIN Jubilee Oval	Tony Archer; Gavin Badger	17,974
Wests Tigers	34–12	Bulldogs	4 September 2009, 7:45pm	Sydney Football Stadium	Steve Lyons; Jared Maxwell	17,375
Manly-Warringah Sea Eagles	38–4	Gold Coast Titans	5 September 2009, 7:30pm	Brookvale Oval	Shayne Hayne; Bernard Sutton	14,165
Cronulla Sharks	24–26	South Sydney Rabbitohs	5 September 2009, 7:30pm	Toyota Stadium	Matt Cecchin; Gerard Sutton	14,879
New Zealand Warriors	0–30	Melbourne Storm	5 September 2009, 7:30pm	Mt Smart Stadium	Ashley Klein; Alan Shortall	14,734
Sydney Roosters	16–32	North Queensland Cowboys	6 September 2009, 2:00pm	Sydney Football Stadium	Chris James; Steve Lyons	10,277
Newcastle Knights	35–0	Penrith Panthers	6 September 2009, 3:00pm	Energy Australia Stadium	Gavin Badger; Ben Cummins	22,152
Brisbane Broncos	22–10	Canberra Raiders	6 September 2009, 7:00pm	Suncorp Stadium	Jason Robinson; Brett Suttor	35,112
Source: "NRL 2009 Round 26". Rugby League Project.

== Finals series ==
=== Qualifying finals ===
Home	Score	Away	Match Information
Home	Score	Away	Date and Time	Venue	Referees	Crowd
Melbourne Storm	40 – 12	Manly-Warringah Sea Eagles	11 September, 7:45pm	Etihad Stadium	Gavin Badger; Shayne Hayne	21,155
Gold Coast Titans	32 – 40	Brisbane Broncos	12 September, 6:30pm	Skilled Park	Ben Cummins; Ashley Klein	27,227
Bulldogs	26 – 12	Newcastle Knights	12 September, 8:30pm	ANZ Stadium	Tony Archer; Jason Robinson	21,369
St George Illawarra Dragons	12 – 25	Parramatta Eels	13 September, 4:00pm	WIN Jubilee Oval	Jarred Maxwell; Matt Cecchin	18,174
Eliminated: Newcastle Knights, Manly-Warringah Sea Eagles

=== Semi finals ===
Home	Score	Away	Match Information
Home	Score	Away	Date and Time	Venue	Referees	Crowd
Parramatta Eels	27 – 2	Gold Coast Titans	18 September, 7:45pm	Sydney Football Stadium	Shayne Hayne; Jared Maxwell	28,524
Brisbane Broncos	24 – 10	St. George Illawarra Dragons	19 September, 7:45pm	Suncorp Stadium	Tony Archer; Ben Cummins	50,225
Eliminated: Gold Coast Titans, St. George Illawarra Dragons

=== Preliminary finals ===
Home	Score	Away	Match Information
Home	Score	Away	Date and Time	Venue	Referees	Crowd
Bulldogs	12 – 22	Parramatta Eels	25 September, 7:45pm	ANZ Stadium	Tony Archer; Ben Cummins	74,549
Melbourne Storm	40 – 10	Brisbane Broncos	26 September, 7:45pm	Etihad Stadium	Shayne Hayne; Jared Maxwell	27,687
Eliminated: Bulldogs, Brisbane Broncos

=== Grand final ===
Home	Score	Away	Match Information
Home	Score	Away	Date and Time	Venue	Referees	Crowd
Melbourne Storm	23 – 16	Parramatta Eels	4 October, 5:00pm	ANZ Stadium	Tony Archer; Shayne Hayne	82,538

Again, a Finals match up between the 2 clubs provided controversy. With just under 10 minutes remaining the Melbourne Storm fullback, Billy Slater was bringing the ball off his own line. Whilst playing the ball he appeared to drop the ball. However, referees Archer and Hayne gave a penalty saying that Parramatta fullback Jarryd Hayne had knocked the ball out of Slater's hand. From the subsequent penalty Storm centre Greg Inglis kicked a field goal to prevent a Parramatta comeback. In 2010 it was found that the Melbourne Storm had cheated the salary cap and as a result both this Premiership and the 2007 Premiership were wiped from the club as well as the 3 Minor Premierships it had gained and the World Club Challenge.
