= 2019 NRL season results =

Rugby league season

The 2019 NRL season was the 112th of professional rugby league in Australia and the 22nd season run by the National Rugby League.

== Regular season ==
All times are in AEST (UTC+10:00) on the relevant dates.

=== Round 1 ===
Home	Score	Away	Match information			
Home	Score	Away	Date and time	Venue	Referees	Attendance
Melbourne Storm	22 – 12	Brisbane Broncos	Thursday, 14 March, 7:50 pm	AAMI Park	Gerard Sutton, Matt Noyen	16,239
Newcastle Knights	14 – 8	Cronulla-Sutherland Sharks	Friday, 15 March, 6:00 pm	McDonald Jones Stadium	Peter Gough, Phil Henderson	21,813
Sydney Roosters	16 – 26	South Sydney Rabbitohs	Friday, 15 March, 7:55 pm	Sydney Cricket Ground	Grant Atkins, Gavin Badger	24,527
New Zealand Warriors	40 – 6	Canterbury-Bankstown Bulldogs	Saturday, 16 March, 3:00 pm	Mount Smart Stadium	Jon Stone, Tim Roby	18,795
Wests Tigers	20 – 6	Manly-Warringah Sea Eagles	Saturday, 16 March, 5:30 pm	Leichhardt Oval	Adam Gee, Adam Cassidy	13,159
North Queensland Cowboys	24 – 12	St. George Illawarra Dragons	Saturday, 16 March, 7:35 pm	1300SMILES Stadium	Ben Cummins, Ziggy Przeklasa-Adamski	18,415
Penrith Panthers	12 – 20	Parramatta Eels	Sunday, 17 March, 4:05 pm	Panthers Stadium	Ashley Klein, Chris Butler	12,604
Gold Coast Titans	0 – 21	Canberra Raiders	Sunday, 17 March, 6:10 pm	Cbus Super Stadium	Dave Munro, Liam Kennedy	9,843

- The Parramatta Eels won an away game for the first time since Round 25, 2017, ending a 13 game losing streak.
- The Gold Coast Titans became the first team since the North Queensland Cowboys in 2012 to be held scoreless in Round 1.

=== Round 2 ===
Home	Score	Away	Match information			
Home	Score	Away	Date and time	Venue	Referees	Attendance
St. George Illawarra Dragons	18 – 34	South Sydney Rabbitohs	Thursday, 21 March, 7:50 pm	Netstrata Jubilee Stadium	Gerard Sutton, Peter Gough	10,080
Canberra Raiders	10 – 22	Melbourne Storm	Friday, 22 March, 6:00 pm	GIO Stadium	Adam Gee, Phil Henderson	14,031
Brisbane Broncos	29 – 10	North Queensland Cowboys	Friday, 22 March, 7:55 pm	Suncorp Stadium	Grant Atkins, Gavin Badger	45,023
Cronulla-Sutherland Sharks	20 – 6	Gold Coast Titans	Saturday, 23 March, 3:00 pm	Shark Park	Jon Stone, Tim Roby	15,217
Newcastle Knights	14 – 16	Penrith Panthers	Saturday, 23 March, 5:30 pm	McDonald Jones Stadium	Dave Munro, Chris Sutton	19,451
Manly-Warringah Sea Eagles	18 – 26	Sydney Roosters	Saturday, 23 March, 7:35 pm	Lottoland	Matt Cecchin, Chris Butler	9,664
Canterbury-Bankstown Bulldogs	16 – 36	Parramatta Eels	Sunday, 24 March, 4:05 pm	ANZ Stadium	Ben Cummins, Ziggy Przeklasa-Adamski	20,134
Wests Tigers	34 – 6	New Zealand Warriors	Sunday, 24 March, 6:10 pm	Campbelltown Stadium	Ashley Klein, Matt Noyen	9,881

- For the first time in their 20 year history as a merger, the Wests Tigers sit on top the competition ladder.

=== Round 3 ===
Home	Score	Away	Match information			
Home	Score	Away	Date and time	Venue	Referees	Attendance
Brisbane Broncos	24 – 25	St George Illawarra Dragons	Thursday, 28 March, 7:50 pm	Suncorp Stadium	Ben Cummins, Ziggy Przeklasa-Adamski	21,081
Canberra Raiders	17 – 10	Newcastle Knights	Friday, 29 March, 6:00 pm	GIO Stadium	Jon Stone, Tim Roby	10,585
Parramatta Eels	18 – 32	Sydney Roosters	Friday, 29 March, 7:55 pm	ANZ Stadium	Gerard Sutton, Peter Gough	13,367
Manly-Warringah Sea Eagles	46 – 12	New Zealand Warriors	Saturday, 30 March, 3:00 pm	Christchurch Stadium	Dave Munro, Chris Sutton	11,774
North Queensland Cowboys	16 – 42	Cronulla-Sutherland Sharks	Saturday, 30 March, 5:30 pm	1300SMILES Stadium	Matt Cecchin, Phil Henderson	11,610
Penrith Panthers	2 – 32	Melbourne Storm	Saturday, 30 March, 7:35 pm	Carrington Park	Ashley Klein, Adam Cassidy	10,973
Wests Tigers	8 – 22	Canterbury-Bankstown Bulldogs	Sunday, 31 March, 4:05 pm	Campbelltown Stadium	Grant Atkins, Gavin Badger	15,127
South Sydney Rabbitohs	28 – 20	Gold Coast Titans	Sunday, 31 March, 6:10 pm	ANZ Stadium	Matt Noyen, Chris Butler	10,128

- The North Queensland Cowboys suffered their biggest loss since the 2017 NRL Grand Final, and their biggest at home since round 8, 2010.

=== Round 4 ===
Home	Score	Away	Match information			
Home	Score	Away	Date and time	Venue	Referees	Attendance
Sydney Roosters	36 – 4	Brisbane Broncos	Thursday, 4 April, 7:50 pm	Sydney Cricket Ground	Ashley Klein, Phil Henderson	9,304
New Zealand Warriors	26 – 10	Gold Coast Titans	Friday, 5 April, 6:00 pm	Mount Smart Stadium	Peter Gough, Jon Stone	13,995
Penrith Panthers	9 – 8	Wests Tigers	Friday, 5 April, 7:55 pm	Panthers Stadium	Gerard Sutton, Ziggy Przeklasa-Adamski	14,002
Manly-Warringah Sea Eagles	13 – 12	South Sydney Rabbitohs	Saturday, 6 April, 3:00 pm	Lottoland	Grant Atkins, Liam Kennedy	12,304
North Queensland Cowboys	12 – 30	Canberra Raiders	Saturday, 6 April, 5:30 pm	1300SMILES Stadium	Dave Munro, Gavin Badger	11,750
Parramatta Eels	24 – 12	Cronulla-Sutherland Sharks	Saturday, 6 April, 7:35 pm	ANZ Stadium	Chris Sutton, Chris Butler	11,185
Melbourne Storm	18 – 16	Canterbury-Bankstown Bulldogs	Sunday, 7 April, 4:05 pm	AAMI Park	Ben Cummins, Tim Roby	15,432
Newcastle Knights	12 – 13	St George Illawarra Dragons	Sunday, 7 April, 6:10 pm	McDonald Jones Stadium	Matt Cecchin, Adam Cassidy	19,105

- The Brisbane Broncos suffered their worst loss since round 17, 2016.
- The Gold Coast Titans had a 0-4 start to a year for the first time in their history.

=== Round 5 ===
Home	Score	Away	Match information			
Home	Score	Away	Date and time	Venue	Referees	Attendance
Brisbane Broncos	16 – 22	Wests Tigers	Thursday, 11 April, 7:50 pm	Suncorp Stadium	Ben Cummins, Ziggy Przeklasa-Adamski	24,398
Gold Coast Titans	30 – 24	Penrith Panthers	Friday, 12 April, 6:00 pm	Cbus Super Stadium	Dave Munro, Liam Kennedy	8,680
North Queensland Cowboys	12 – 18	Melbourne Storm	Friday, 12 April, 7:55 pm	1300SMILES Stadium	Grant Atkins, Gavin Badger	14,130
South Sydney Rabbitohs	28 – 24	New Zealand Warriors	Saturday, 13 April, 3:00 pm	Sunshine Coast Stadium	Chris Sutton, Chris Butler	11,912
Newcastle Knights	18 – 26	Manly-Warringah Sea Eagles	Saturday, 13 April, 5:30 pm	McDonald Jones Stadium	Peter Gough, Jon Stone	21,779
Cronulla-Sutherland Sharks	16 – 30	Sydney Roosters	Saturday, 13 April, 7:35 pm	Shark Park	Matt Cecchin, Phil Henderson	13,470
St George Illawarra Dragons	40 – 4	Canterbury-Bankstown Bulldogs	Sunday, 14 April, 4:05 pm	Netstrata Jubilee Stadium	Ashley Klein, Gerard Sutton	13,409
Canberra Raiders	19 – 0	Parramatta Eels	Sunday, 14 April, 6:10 pm	GIO Stadium	Henry Perenara, Tim Roby	16,059

- The Rabbitohs/Warriors game was the first NRL game on the Sunshine Coast.
- The Bulldogs 40-4 loss to the Dragons was their worst to any St George team since round 18, 1965.

=== Round 6 ===
Home	Score	Away	Match information			
Home	Score	Away	Date and time	Venue	Referees	Attendance
Cronulla-Sutherland Sharks	24 – 20	Penrith Panthers	Thursday, 18 April, 7:50 pm	Shark Park	Ben Cummins, Ziggy Przeklasa-Adamski	10,088
Canterbury-Bankstown Bulldogs	6 – 14	South Sydney Rabbitohs	Friday, 19 April, 4:05 pm	ANZ Stadium	Henry Perenara, Tim Roby	30,040
Melbourne Storm	20 – 21	Sydney Roosters	Friday, 19 April, 7:55 pm	AAMI Park	Ashley Klein, Grant Atkins	17,036
New Zealand Warriors	10 – 17	North Queensland Cowboys	Saturday, 20 April, 5:30 pm	Mount Smart Stadium	Peter Gough, Jon Stone	11,395
St George Illawarra Dragons	12 – 10	Manly-Warringah Sea Eagles	Saturday, 20 April, 7:35 pm	WIN Stadium	David Munro, Liam Kennedy	14,268
Gold Coast Titans	38 – 14	Newcastle Knights	Sunday, 21 April, 2:00 pm	Cbus Super Stadium	Chris Sutton, Phil Henderson	11,654
Canberra Raiders	26 – 22	Brisbane Broncos	Sunday, 21 April, 4:05 pm	GIO Stadium	Matt Cecchin, Adam Cassidy	17,193
Parramatta Eels	51 – 6	Wests Tigers	Monday, 22 April, 4:00 pm	Bankwest Stadium	Gerard Sutton, Chris Butler	29,047

- The Broncos 1-5 start to the year is their worst start to a season since 1999.
- The game between the Eels and Tigers was the first played at Bankwest Stadium, and it was the Eels biggest win since round 25, 2007.

=== Round 7 (ANZAC Round) ===
Home	Score	Away	Match information			
Home	Score	Away	Date and time	Venue	Referees	Attendance
Sydney Roosters	20 – 10*	St George Illawarra Dragons	Thursday, 25 April, 4:05 pm	Sydney Cricket Ground	Ben Cummins, Grant Atkins	38,414
Melbourne Storm	13 – 12	New Zealand Warriors	Thursday, 25 April, 7:50 pm	AAMI Park	Matt Cecchin, Dave Munro	21,539
Canterbury-Bankstown Bulldogs	24 – 12	North Queensland Cowboys	Friday, 26 April, 6:00 pm	ANZ Stadium	Chris Sutton, Phil Henderson	6,711
Penrith Panthers	18 – 22	South Sydney Rabbitohs	Friday, 26 April, 7:55 pm	Panthers Stadium	Ashley Klein, Ziggy Przeklasa-Adamski	14,931
Wests Tigers	30 – 14	Gold Coast Titans	Saturday, 27 April, 5:30 pm	Scully Park	Peter Gough, Jon Stone	9,799
Brisbane Broncos	29 – 6	Cronulla-Sutherland Sharks	Saturday, 27 April, 7:35 pm	Suncorp Stadium	Henry Perenara, Tim Roby	27,638
Manly-Warringah Sea Eagles	24 – 20	Canberra Raiders	Sunday, 28 April, 2:00 pm	Lottoland	Gerard Sutton, Adam Gee	10,706
Newcastle Knights	28 – 14	Parramatta Eels	Sunday, 28 April, 4:05 pm	McDonald Jones Stadium	Grant Atkins, Chris Butler	19,604

=== Round 8 ===
Home	Score	Away	Match information			
Home	Score	Away	Date and time	Venue	Referees	Attendance
South Sydney Rabbitohs	38 – 6	Brisbane Broncos	Thursday, 2 May, 7:50 pm	ANZ Stadium	Gerard Sutton, Peter Gough	13,643
North Queensland Cowboys	28 – 14	Gold Coast Titans	Friday, 3 May, 6:00 pm	1300SMILES Stadium	Adam Gee, Gavin Badger	10,655
Cronulla-Sutherland Sharks	20 – 18	Melbourne Storm	Friday, 3 May, 7:55 pm	Shark Park	Ben Cummins, Ziggy Przeklasa-Adamski	7,683
Canberra Raiders	30 – 12	Penrith Panthers	Saturday, 4 May, 3:00 pm	McDonalds Park	Grant Atkins, Dave Munro	10,079
Manly-Warringah Sea Eagles	18 – 10	Canterbury-Bankstown Bulldogs	Saturday, 4 May, 5:30 pm	Lottoland	Henry Perenara, Jon Stone	10,148
Sydney Roosters	42 – 12	Wests Tigers	Saturday, 4 May, 7:35 pm	Sydney Cricket Ground	Matt Cecchin, Tim Roby	13,666
New Zealand Warriors	18 – 36	Newcastle Knights	Sunday, 5 May, 2:00 pm	Mount Smart Stadium	Chris Sutton, Phil Henderson	14,975
Parramatta Eels	32 – 18	St George Illawarra Dragons	Sunday, 5 May, 4:05 pm	Bankwest Stadium	Ashley Klein, Chris Butler	25,872

- The Raiders/Panthers game was the first game played in Wagga Wagga since 1998.

=== Round 9 (Magic Round) ===
Team 1	Score	Team 2	Match information			
Team 1	Score	Team 2	Date and time	Venue	Referees	Attendance
Gold Coast Titans	18 – 26	Cronulla-Sutherland Sharks	Thursday, 9 May, 7:50 pm	Suncorp Stadium	Grant Atkins, Dave Munro	17,113
Wests Tigers	30 – 4	Penrith Panthers	Friday, 10 May, 6:00 pm	Suncorp Stadium	Chris Sutton, Chris Butler	35,122
Manly-Warringah Sea Eagles	10 – 26	Brisbane Broncos	Friday, 10 May, 8:05 pm	Suncorp Stadium	Ben Cummins, Ziggy Przeklasa-Adamski	41,388
Canterbury-Bankstown Bulldogs	10 – 22	Newcastle Knights	Saturday, 11 May, 3:00 pm	Suncorp Stadium	Matt Cecchin, Tim Roby	25,292
New Zealand Warriors	26 – 18	St George Illawarra Dragons	Saturday, 11 May, 5:30 pm	Suncorp Stadium	Adam Gee, Gavin Badger	37,521
Melbourne Storm	64 – 10	Parramatta Eels	Saturday, 11 May, 7:35 pm	Suncorp Stadium	Henry Perenara, Jon Stone	41,612
Sydney Roosters	30 – 24	Canberra Raiders	Sunday, 12 May, 2:00 pm	Suncorp Stadium	Gerard Sutton, Peter Gough	29,686
South Sydney Rabbitohs	32 – 16	North Queensland Cowboys	Sunday, 12 May, 4:05 pm	Suncorp Stadium	Ashley Klein, Phil Henderson	34,564

- For the first time in NRL History, all games were played on the same ground for Magic Round.
- The Knights beat the Bulldogs for the first time since the Elimination Finals in 2013.

=== Round 10 ===
Home	Score	Away	Match information			
Home	Score	Away	Date and time	Venue	Referees	Attendance
Melbourne Storm	24 – 22	Wests Tigers	Thursday, 16 May, 7:50 pm	AAMI Park	Adam Gee, Gavin Badger	11,402
Penrith Panthers	10 – 30	New Zealand Warriors	Friday, 17 May, 6:00 pm	Panthers Stadium	Henry Perenara, Jon Stone	10,084
Brisbane Broncos	15 – 10	Sydney Roosters	Friday, 17 May, 7:55 pm	Suncorp Stadium	Grant Atkins, Dave Munro	28,228
Gold Coast Titans	16 – 22	Canterbury-Bankstown Bulldogs	Saturday, 18 May, 3:00 pm	Cbus Super Stadium	Peter Gough, Ziggy Przeklasa-Adamski	10,105
North Queensland Cowboys	17 – 10	Parramatta Eels	Saturday, 18 May, 5:30 pm	1300SMILES Stadium	Chris Sutton, Phil Henderson	12,493
Canberra Raiders	12 – 16	South Sydney Rabbitohs	Saturday, 18 May, 7:35 pm	GIO Stadium	Ben Cummins, Chris Butler	16,965
St George Illawarra Dragons	12 – 45	Newcastle Knights	Sunday, 19 May, 2:00 pm	Glen Willow Oval	Gerard Sutton, Liam Kennedy	9,267
Cronulla-Sutherland Sharks	14 – 24	Manly-Warringah Sea Eagles	Sunday, 19 May, 4:05 pm	Shark Park	Ashley Klein, Matt Cecchin	13,360

- The Penrith Panthers 2-8 start to the season is their worst start to a season since 2002.
- The Gold Coast Titans suffered the worst collapse in their history, after leading 16-0.
- The Newcastle Knights had their biggest win since round 10, 2013.

=== Round 11 (Indigenous Round) ===
Home	Score	Away	Match information			
Home	Score	Away	Date and time	Venue	Referees	Attendance
Parramatta Eels	10 – 16	Penrith Panthers	Thursday, 23 May, 7:50 pm	Bankwest Stadium	Grant Atkins, Dave Munro	16,228
Manly-Warringah Sea Eagles	18 – 36	Gold Coast Titans	Friday, 24 May, 6:00 pm	Lottoland	Matt Cecchin, Phil Henderson	7,465
Newcastle Knights	38 – 12	Sydney Roosters	Friday, 24 May, 7:55 pm	McDonald Jones Stadium	Ben Cummins, Peter Gough	25,929
Canberra Raiders	16 – 22	North Queensland Cowboys	Saturday, 25 May, 3:00 pm	GIO Stadium	Henry Perenara, Jon Stone	14,647
New Zealand Warriors	2 – 8	Brisbane Broncos	Saturday, 25 May, 5:30 pm	Mount Smart Stadium	Ashley Klein, Ziggy Przeklasa-Adamski	17,495
South Sydney Rabbitohs	32 – 16	Wests Tigers	Saturday, 25 May, 7:35 pm	ANZ Stadium	Gerard Sutton, Liam Kennedy	18,195
Canterbury-Bankstown Bulldogs	6 – 28	Melbourne Storm	Sunday, 26 May, 2:00 pm	Belmore Sports Ground	Chris Sutton, Chris Butler	13,131
St George Illawarra Dragons	9 – 22	Cronulla-Sutherland Sharks	Sunday, 26 May, 4:05 pm	WIN Stadium	Adam Gee, Gavin Badger	14,586

=== Round 12 ===
Home	Score	Away	Match information			
Home	Score	Away	Date and time	Venue	Referees	Attendance
Penrith Panthers	15 - 12	Manly-Warringah Sea Eagles	Thursday, 30 May, 7:50 pm	Panthers Stadium	Ben Cummins, Peter Gough	7,891
Parramatta Eels	26–14	South Sydney Rabbitohs	Friday, 31 May, 7:55 pm	Bankwest Stadium	Adam Gee, Gavin Badger	21,645
Canterbury-Bankstown Bulldogs	10 - 12	Canberra Raiders	Saturday, 1 June, 7:35 pm	ANZ Stadium	Grant Atkins, Dave Munro	7,213
Gold Coast Titans	4 – 6	North Queensland Cowboys	Sunday, 2 June, 4:05 pm	Cbus Super Stadium	Henry Perenara, Jon Stone	11,226
Bye: Brisbane Broncos, Cronulla-Sutherland Sharks, Melbourne Storm, Newcastle Knights, New Zealand Warriors, St George Illawarra Dragons, Sydney Roosters & Wests Tigers.

- The North Queensland Cowboys score of 6 is their lowest ever in a win.

=== Round 13 ===
Home	Score	Away	Match information			
Home	Score	Away	Date and time	Venue	Referees	Attendance
South Sydney Rabbitohs	12 – 20	Newcastle Knights	Friday, 7 June, 6:00 pm	ANZ Stadium	Grant Atkins, Dave Munro	8,253
Wests Tigers	0 – 28	Canberra Raiders	Friday, 7 June, 7:55 pm	Bankwest Stadium	Matt Cecchin, Adam Cassidy	12,585
New Zealand Warriors	10 – 32	Melbourne Storm	Saturday, 8 June, 3:00 pm	Mount Smart Stadium	Henry Perenara, Jon Stone	12,957
Cronulla-Sutherland Sharks	42 – 22	Parramatta Eels	Saturday, 8 June, 5:30 pm	Shark Park	Peter Gough, Chris Butler	12,386
North Queensland Cowboys	20 – 22	Manly-Warringah Sea Eagles	Saturday, 8 June, 7:35 pm	1300SMILES Stadium	Adam Gee, Gavin Badger	13,314
Brisbane Broncos	18 - 26	Gold Coast Titans	Sunday, 9 June, 2:00 pm	Suncorp Stadium	Chris Sutton, Phil Henderson	30,048
Penrith Panthers	19 – 10	Sydney Roosters	Sunday, 9 June, 4:05 pm	Panthers Stadium	Ben Cummins, Ziggy Przeklasa-Adamski	16,833
Canterbury-Bankstown Bulldogs	12 – 36 *	St George Illawarra Dragons	Monday, 10 June, 4:00 pm	ANZ Stadium	Gerard Sutton, Liam Kennedy	16,003

- For the first time in their history, the Canberra Raiders have kept 3 teams scoreless in the same season.
- The South Sydney Rabbitohs-Newcastle Knights game featured 4 sin bins all at the same time.
- The Knights beat the Rabbitohs for the first time since Round 26, 2011.

=== Round 14 ===
Home	Score	Away	Match information			
Home	Score	Away	Date and time	Venue	Referees	Attendance
Canberra Raiders	22 – 20	Cronulla-Sutherland Sharks	Thursday, 13 June, 7:55 pm	GIO Stadium	Ashley Klein, Peter Gough	10,021
Gold Coast Titans	20 – 24	New Zealand Warriors	Friday, 14 June, 6:00 pm	Cbus Super Stadium	Grant Atkins, Ziggy Przeklasa-Adamski	9,973
North Queensland Cowboys	26 – 27	Wests Tigers	Friday, 14 June, 7:55 pm	1300SMILES Stadium	Ben Cummins, Dave Munro	11,692
Melbourne Storm	34 – 4	Newcastle Knights	Saturday, 15 June, 3:00 pm	AAMI Park	Gerard Sutton, Gavin Badger	16,313
South Sydney Rabbitohs	18 – 19	Penrith Panthers	Saturday, 15 June, 5:30 pm	ANZ Stadium	Adam Gee, Jon Stone	11,023
Parramatta Eels	38 – 10	Brisbane Broncos	Saturday, 15 June, 7:35 pm	Bankwest Stadium	Henry Perenara, Liam Kennedy	16,854
Manly-Warringah Sea Eagles	34 – 14	St George Illawarra Dragons	Sunday, 16 June, 2:00 pm	Lottoland	Chris Sutton, Phil Henderson	8,468
Sydney Roosters	38 – 12	Canterbury-Bankstown Bulldogs	Sunday, 16 June, 4:05 pm	Sydney Cricket Ground	Matt Cecchin, Adam Cassidy	8,217

- The Penrith Panthers beat the South Sydney Rabbitohs at ANZ Stadium for the first time in their history.

=== Round 15 ===
Home	Score	Away	Match information			
Home	Score	Away	Date and time	Venue	Referees	Attendance
Wests Tigers	14 – 9	South Sydney Rabbitohs	Thursday, 27 June, 7:50 pm	Bankwest Stadium	Adam Gee, Gavin Badger	9,807
St George Illawarra Dragons	22 – 14	North Queensland Cowboys	Friday, 28 June, 6:00 pm	WIN Stadium	Henry Perenara, Liam Kennedy	7,008
Sydney Roosters	12 – 14	Melbourne Storm	Friday, 28 June, 7:55 pm	Adelaide Oval	Grant Aitkins, Peter Gough	16,297
Gold Coast Titans	12 – 30	Manly-Warringah Sea Eagles	Saturday, 29 June, 3:00 pm	Cbus Super Stadium	Chris Sutton, Phil Henderson	11,056
Newcastle Knights	26 – 12	Brisbane Broncos	Saturday, 29 June, 5:30 pm	McDonald Jones Stadium	Ashley Klein, Matt Noyen	24,397
Parramatta Eels	22 – 16	Canberra Raiders	Saturday, 29 June, 7:35 pm	TIO Stadium	Matt Cecchin, Jon Stone	5,391
New Zealand Warriors	18 – 19	Penrith Panthers	Sunday, 30 June, 2:00 pm	Mount Smart Stadium	Gerard Sutton, Adam Cassidy	12,952
Canterbury-Bankstown Bulldogs	14 – 12	Cronulla-Sutherland Sharks	Sunday, 30 June, 4:05 pm	ANZ Stadium	Ben Cummins, Ziggy Przeklasa-Adamski	8,358

- The crowd for the Eels/Raiders game was the lowest of the season so far.

=== Round 16 ===
Home	Score	Away	Match information			
Home	Score	Away	Date and time	Venue	Referees	Attendance
St George Illawarra Dragons	14 – 16	Melbourne Storm	Thursday, 4 July, 7:50 pm	WIN Stadium	Ben Cummins, Dave Munro	5,578
Wests Tigers	16 – 24	Sydney Roosters	Friday, 5 July, 7:55 pm	Bankwest Stadium	Henry Perenara, Matt Noyen	13,918
Newcastle Knights	20 – 24	New Zealand Warriors	Saturday, 6 July, 7:35 pm	McDonald Jones Stadium	Adam Gee, Gavin Badger	12,740
Cronulla-Sutherland Sharks	22 – 24	Brisbane Broncos	Sunday, 7 July, 4:05 pm	Shark Park	Matt Cecchin, Ziggy Przeklasa-Adamski	10,964
Bye: Canberra Raiders, Canterbury-Bankstown Bulldogs, Gold Coast Titans, Manly-Warringah Sea Eagles, North Queensland Cowboys, Parramatta Eels, Penrith Panthers & South Sydney Rabbitohs.

- For the first time in NRL History, a team (Cronulla Sharks) lost 3 straight after scoring more tries than their opponent in all of those games.

=== Round 17 ===
Home	Score	Away	Match information			
Home	Score	Away	Date and time	Venue	Referees	Attendance
Penrith Panthers	24 – 2	Gold Coast Titans	Friday, 12 July, 6:00 pm	Panthers Stadium	Henry Perenara, Jon Stone	10,317
Newcastle Knights	14 – 20	Canterbury-Bankstown Bulldogs	Friday, 12 July, 7:55 pm	McDonald Jones Stadium	Matt Cecchin, Phil Henderson	17,757
South Sydney Rabbitohs	21 – 20	Manly-Warringah Sea Eagles	Saturday, 13 July, 3:00 pm	ANZ Stadium	Grant Atkins, Liam Kennedy	13,434
Brisbane Broncos	18 – 18	New Zealand Warriors	Saturday, 13 July, 5:30 pm	Suncorp Stadium	Chris Sutton, Matt Noyen	31,018
Melbourne Storm	40 – 16	Cronulla-Sutherland Sharks	Saturday, 13 July, 7:35 pm	AAMI Park	Ben Cummins, Ziggy Przeklasa-Adamski	22,737
Sydney Roosters	12 – 15	North Queensland Cowboys	Sunday, 14 July, 2:00 pm	Central Coast Stadium	Peter Gough, Dave Munro	14,668
Wests Tigers	18 – 30	Parramatta Eels	Sunday, 14 July, 4:05 pm	Bankwest Stadium	Gerard Sutton, Adam Cassidy	24,125
St George Illawarra Dragons	14 – 36	Canberra Raiders	Sunday, 14 July, 6:10 pm	WIN Stadium	Ashley Klein, Todd Smith	9,159

- The Broncos Warriors game marked the first NRL draw since Round 21, 2016.
- Cameron Smith played his 400th NRL game in Melbourne's win over Cronulla.
- Canberra Raiders centre Nick Cotric became the first player of the 2019 season to be sent off for a spear tackle on his Dragons opposite Tim Lafai.

=== Round 18 ===
Home	Score	Away	Match information			
Home	Score	Away	Date and time	Venue	Referees	Attendance
Brisbane Broncos	28 – 6	Canterbury-Bankstown Bulldogs	Thursday, 18 July, 7:50 pm	Suncorp Stadium	Ben Cummins, Belinda Sharpe	20,818
New Zealand Warriors	19 – 18	Cronulla-Sutherland Sharks	Friday, 19 July, 6:00 pm	Westpac Stadium	Henry Perenara, Phil Henderson	14,295
Penrith Panthers	40 – 18	St George Illawarra Dragons	Friday, 19 July, 7:55 pm	Panthers Stadium	Grant Atkins, Jon Stone	13,610
Sydney Roosters	48 – 10	Newcastle Knights	Saturday, 20 July, 3:00 pm	Sydney Cricket Ground	Ashley Klein, Gavin Badger	14,053
Canberra Raiders	20 – 12	Wests Tigers	Saturday, 20 July, 5:30 pm	GIO Stadium	Adam Gee, Chris Butler	15,656
North Queensland Cowboys	18 – 30	South Sydney Rabbitohs	Saturday, 20 July, 7:35 pm	1300SMILES Stadium	Chris Sutton, Matt Noyen	16,638
Gold Coast Titans	18 - 38	Melbourne Storm	Sunday, 21 July, 2:00 pm	Cbus Super Stadium	Peter Gough, Dave Munro	11,143
Manly-Warringah Sea Eagles	36 – 24	Parramatta Eels	Sunday, 21 July, 4:05 pm	Lottoland	Matt Cecchin, Ziggy Przeklasa-Adamski	15,245

- Thursday’s game was the first ever match in Australian professional rugby league history to be refereed by a female, with Belinda Sharpe partnering Ben Cummins as the whistleblowers.
- The Penrith Panthers had their biggest win over the Dragons since 2000.

=== Round 19 ===
Home	Score	Away	Match information			
Home	Score	Away	Date and time	Venue	Referees	Attendance
Cronulla-Sutherland Sharks	16 - 14	North Queensland Cowboys	Thursday, 25 July, 7:50 pm	Shark Park	Matt Cecchin, Jon Stone	6,144
Newcastle Knights	26 – 28	Wests Tigers	Friday, 26 July, 6:00 pm	McDonald Jones Stadium	Henry Perenara, Gavin Badger	21,029
South Sydney Rabbitohs	20 – 16	St George Illawarra Dragons	Friday, 26 July, 7:55 pm	ANZ Stadium	Gerard Sutton, Matt Noyen	12,318
Parramatta Eels	24 – 22	New Zealand Warriors	Saturday, 27 July, 3:00 pm	Bankwest Stadium	Chris Sutton, Chris Butler	17,392
Gold Coast Titans	12 – 34	Brisbane Broncos	Saturday, 27 July, 5:30 pm	Cbus Super Stadium	Ben Cummins, Belinda Sharpe	16,201
Melbourne Storm	10 – 11	Manly-Warringah Sea Eagles	Saturday, 27 July, 7:35 pm	AAMI Park	Grant Atkins, Peter Gough	14,836
Canterbury-Bankstown Bulldogs	12 – 20	Sydney Roosters	Sunday, 28 July, 2:00 pm	ANZ Stadium	Adam Gee, Ziggy Przeklasa-Adamski	10,586
Penrith Panthers	18 – 30	Canberra Raiders	Sunday, 28 July, 4:05 pm	Panthers Stadium	Ashley Klein, Dave Munro	15,560

=== Round 20 ===
Home	Score	Away	Match information			
Home	Score	Away	Date and time	Venue	Referees	Attendance
Wests Tigers	28 – 4	North Queensland Cowboys	Thursday, 1 August, 7:50 pm	Leichhardt Oval	Grant Atkins, Jon Stone	10,016
New Zealand Warriors	12 – 46	Canberra Raiders	Friday, 2 August, 6:00 pm	Mount Smart Stadium	Matt Cecchin, Gavin Badger	10,395
Brisbane Broncos	4 – 40	Melbourne Storm	Friday, 2 August, 7:55 pm	Suncorp Stadium	Gerard Sutton, Ziggy Przeklasa-Adamski	36,049
Manly-Warringah Sea Eagles	30 – 6	Newcastle Knights	Saturday, 3 August, 3:00 pm	Lottoland	Henry Perenara, Phil Henderson	15,012
Canterbury-Bankstown Bulldogs	16 – 8	Penrith Panthers	Saturday, 3 August, 5:30 pm	Bankwest Stadium	Ben Cummins, Belinda Sharpe	10,062
Cronulla-Sutherland Sharks	39 – 24	South Sydney Rabbitohs	Saturday, 3 August, 7:35 pm	Shark Park	Adam Gee, Dave Munro	13,523
Sydney Roosters	58 – 6	Gold Coast Titans	Sunday, 4 August, 2:00 pm	Sydney Cricket Ground	Peter Gough, Liam Kennedy	9,763
St George Illawarra Dragons	4 – 12	Parramatta Eels	Sunday, 4 August, 4:05 pm	Netstrata Jubilee Stadium	Ashley Klein, Todd Smith	9,645

- The Titans 58-6 loss was their second biggest loss ever (just 2 points behind the 54-0 loss against Brisbane in Round 22, 2017), their biggest away loss, and the most points they have ever conceded in their history.
- The Roosters won by more than 50 for the first time since defeating the Eels 56-4 in Round 2, 2014.

=== Round 21 (Retro Round) ===
Home	Score	Away	Match information			
Home	Score	Away	Date and time	Venue	Referees	Attendance
North Queensland Cowboys	14 – 18	Brisbane Broncos	Thursday, 8 August, 7:50 pm	1300SMILES Stadium	Matt Cecchin, Gavin Badger	17,530
New Zealand Warriors	24 – 16	Manly-Warringah Sea Eagles	Friday, 9 August, 6:00 pm	Mount Smart Stadium	Ben Cummins, Ziggy Przeklasa-Adamski	9,595
Penrith Panthers	26 – 20	Cronulla-Sutherland Sharks	Friday, 9 August, 7:55 pm	Panthers Stadium	Grant Atkins, Phil Henderson	10,860
St George Illawarra Dragons	40 – 28	Gold Coast Titans	Saturday, 10 August, 3:00 pm	Netstrata Jubilee Stadium	Henry Perenara, Liam Kennedy	6,532
Parramatta Eels	20 – 14	Newcastle Knights	Saturday, 10 August, 5:30 pm	Bankwest Stadium	Adam Gee, Jon Stone	20,671
Canterbury-Bankstown Bulldogs	18 – 16	Wests Tigers	Saturday, 10 August, 7:35 pm	ANZ Stadium	Peter Gough, Chris Butler	9,636
Canberra Raiders	18 – 22	Sydney Roosters	Sunday, 11 August, 2:00 pm	GIO Stadium	Ashley Klein, Chris Sutton	19,530
South Sydney Rabbitohs	16 – 26	Melbourne Storm	Sunday, 11 August, 4:05 pm	Central Coast Stadium	Gerard Sutton, Dave Munro	19,533

- The Roosters won their first game in Canberra since Round 17, 2010.

=== Round 22 (Women In League Round) ===
Home	Score	Away	Match information			
Home	Score	Away	Date and time	Venue	Referees	Attendance
Manly-Warringah Sea Eagles	32 – 12	Wests Tigers	Thursday, 15 August, 7:50 pm	Lottoland	Gerard Sutton, Chris Butler	8,512
Gold Coast Titans	12 – 36	Parramatta Eels	Friday, 16 August, 6:00 pm	Cbus Super Stadium	Peter Gough, Gavin Badger	10,780
Brisbane Broncos	24 – 12	Penrith Panthers	Friday, 16 August, 7:55 pm	Suncorp Stadium	Ashley Klein, Chris Sutton	23,643
Newcastle Knights	42 – 6	North Queensland Cowboys	Saturday, 17 August, 3:00 pm	McDonald Jones Stadium	Grant Atkins, Phil Henderson	16,752
Melbourne Storm	18 – 22	Canberra Raiders	Saturday, 17 August, 5:30 pm	AAMI Park	Ben Cummins, Ziggy Przeklasa-Adamski	17,769
South Sydney Rabbitohs	6 – 14	Canterbury-Bankstown Bulldogs	Saturday, 17 August, 7:35 pm	ANZ Stadium	Henry Perenara, Belinda Sharpe	14,112
Sydney Roosters	42 – 6	New Zealand Warriors	Sunday, 18 August, 2:00 pm	Sydney Cricket Ground	Matt Cecchin, Dave Munro	12,227
Cronulla-Sutherland Sharks	18 – 12	St George Illawarra Dragons	Sunday, 18 August, 4:05 pm	Shark Park	Adam Gee, Jon Stone	13,652

- Melbourne surrendered an 18-0 lead after 29 minutes.
- The Raiders won their first game in Melbourne since Round 8, 2013.

=== Round 23 ===
Home	Score	Away	Match information			
Home	Score	Away	Date and time	Venue	Referees	Attendance
Parramatta Eels	6 – 12	Canterbury-Bankstown Bulldogs	Thursday, 22 August, 7:50 pm	Bankwest Stadium	Grant Atkins, Peter Gough	18,071
North Queensland Cowboys	24 – 10	Penrith Panthers	Friday, 23 August, 6:00 pm	1300SMILES Stadium	Matt Cecchin, Phil Henderson	10,523
Brisbane Broncos	20 – 22	South Sydney Rabbitohs	Friday, 23 August, 7:55 pm	Suncorp Stadium	Ben Cummins, Henry Perenara	33,225
Cronulla-Sutherland Sharks	42 – 16	New Zealand Warriors	Saturday, 24 August, 3:00 pm	Shark Park	Gerard Sutton, Gavin Badger	11,218
Wests Tigers	46 – 4	Newcastle Knights	Saturday, 24 August, 5:30 pm	Campbelltown Stadium	Adam Gee, Jon Stone	11,107
St George Illawarra Dragons	12 – 34	Sydney Roosters	Saturday, 24 August, 7:35 pm	Netstrata Jubilee Stadium	Chris Sutton, Belinda Sharpe	9,087
Melbourne Storm	24 – 8	Gold Coast Titans	Sunday, 25 August, 2:00 pm	AAMI Park	Chris Butler, Dave Munro	11,758
Canberra Raiders	14 – 18	Manly-Warringah Sea Eagles	Sunday, 25 August, 4:05 pm	GIO Stadium	Ashley Klein, Ziggy Przeklasa-Adamski	20,265

=== Round 24 ===
Home	Score	Away	Match information			
Home	Score	Away	Date and time	Venue	Referees	Attendance
North Queensland Cowboys	15 – 8	Canterbury-Bankstown Bulldogs	Thursday, 29 August, 7:50 pm	1300SMILES Stadium	Chris Sutton, Belinda Sharpe	15,141
New Zealand Warriors	10 – 31	South Sydney Rabbitohs	Friday, 30 August, 6:00 pm	Mount Smart Stadium	Grant Atkins, Dave Munro	15,295
Brisbane Broncos	17 – 16	Parramatta Eels	Friday, 30 August, 7:55 pm	Suncorp Stadium	Ashley Klein, Peter Gough	33,020
Newcastle Knights	38 – 4	Gold Coast Titans	Saturday, 31 August, 3:00 pm	McDonald Jones Stadium	Chris Butler, Gavin Badger	8,274
Manly-Warringah Sea Eagles	6 – 36	Melbourne Storm	Saturday, 31 August, 5:30 pm	Lottoland	Ben Cummins, Adam Gee	14,640
Sydney Roosters	22 – 6	Penrith Panthers	Saturday, 31 August, 7:35 pm	Sydney Cricket Ground	Henry Perenara, Jon Stone	11,311
Cronulla-Sutherland Sharks	14 – 15	Canberra Raiders	Sunday, 1 September, 2:00 pm	Shark Park	Gerard Sutton, Phil Henderson	18,985
St George Illawarra Dragons	14 – 42	Wests Tigers	Sunday, 1 September, 4:05 pm	Sydney Cricket Ground	Matt Cecchin, Ziggy Przeklasa-Adamski	9,136

- The Willows Sports Complex also known as 1300SMILES Stadium hosted its last ever NRL game.
- Paul Gallen played his final regular season home match at Shark Park.
- The Sharks vs. Raiders match was the first match to feature five or more field goals since the 1970 grand final.

=== Round 25 ===
Home	Score	Away	Match information			
Home	Score	Away	Date and time	Venue	Referees	Attendance
South Sydney Rabbitohs	16 – 10	Sydney Roosters	Thursday, 5 September, 7:50 pm	ANZ Stadium	Ashley Klein, Chris Sutton	20,093
Parramatta Eels	32 – 16	Manly-Warringah Sea Eagles	Friday, 6 September, 6:00 pm	Bankwest Stadium	Gerard Sutton, Phil Henderson	25,034
Melbourne Storm	24 – 16	North Queensland Cowboys	Friday, 6 September, 7:55 pm	AAMI Park	Henry Perenara/ Adam Gee, David Munro	12,085
Canberra Raiders	20 – 24	New Zealand Warriors	Saturday, 7 September, 3:00 pm	GIO Stadium	Matt Cecchin, Adam Cassidy	13,331
Canterbury-Bankstown Bulldogs	30 – 14	Brisbane Broncos	Saturday, 7 September, 5:30 pm	ANZ Stadium	Grant Atkins, Chris Butler	9,807
Gold Coast Titans	16 – 24	St George Illawarra Dragons	Saturday, 7 September, 7:35 pm	Cbus Super Stadium	Ziggy Przeklasa-Adamski, Gavin Badger	11,274
Wests Tigers	8 – 25	Cronulla-Sutherland Sharks	Sunday, 8 September, 2:00 pm	Leichhardt Oval	Ben Cummins, Peter Gough	19,491
Penrith Panthers	54 – 10	Newcastle Knights	Sunday, 8 September, 4:05 pm	Panthers Stadium	Adam Gee, Jon Stone	12,027

- South Sydney beat the Roosters twice within the home and away season for the first time since 2009.
- For the 8th straight time the Tigers missed out on the finals.
