= 2020 NRL season results =

The 2020 NRL season was the 113th of professional rugby league in Australia and the 23rd season run by the National Rugby League.

As of 3 May 2020, the season was shortened from 25 rounds to 20, and the finals series and State of Origin pushed back, due to the COVID-19 pandemic. The first two rounds were played before the season was suspended on 23 March, and premiership points earned from the earlier rounds are still counted. The season resumed on 28 May. After playing the first two rounds with 2 referees, the decision was made to play the remaining rounds with one referee. To accommodate this, a number of other rules changes were introduced.

== Regular season ==
All times are in AEDT (UTC+11:00) up until the 5th of April and AEST (UTC+10:00) from then on.

=== Round 1 ===
Home	Score	Away	Match information			
Home	Score	Away	Date and time	Venue	Referees	Attendance
Parramatta Eels	8–2	Canterbury-Bankstown Bulldogs	Thursday, 12 March, 8:05 pm	Bankwest Stadium	Grant Atkins, Peter Gough	21,363
Canberra Raiders	24–6	Gold Coast Titans	Friday, 13 March, 6:00 pm	GIO Stadium	Chris Sutton, David Munro	10,610
North Queensland Cowboys	21–28	Brisbane Broncos	Friday, 13 March, 8:05 pm	Queensland Country Bank Stadium	Gerard Sutton, Gavin Badger	22,459
Newcastle Knights	20–0	New Zealand Warriors	Saturday, 14 March, 3:00 pm	McDonald Jones Stadium	Henry Perenara, Ziggy Przeklasa-Adamski	10,239
South Sydney Rabbitohs	22–18	Cronulla-Sutherland Sharks	Saturday, 14 March, 5:30 pm	ANZ Stadium	Ben Cummins, Belinda Sharpe	6,235
Penrith Panthers	20–14	Sydney Roosters	Saturday, 14 March, 7:35 pm	Panthers Stadium	Adam Gee, Chris Butler	10,160
Manly-Warringah Sea Eagles	4–18	Melbourne Storm	Sunday, 15 March, 4:05 pm	Lottoland	Matt Cecchin, Jon Stone	10,315
St. George Illawarra Dragons	14–24	Wests Tigers	Sunday, 15 March, 6:15 pm	WIN Stadium	Ashley Klein, Phil Henderson	9,137

=== Round 2 ===
Home	Score	Away	Match information			
Home	Score	Away	Date and time	Venue	Referees	Attendance
Canterbury-Bankstown Bulldogs	16–24	North Queensland Cowboys	Thursday, 19 March, 8:05 pm	ANZ Stadium	Adam Gee, Chris Butler	0^{a}
St. George Illawarra Dragons	28–32	Penrith Panthers	Friday, 20 March, 6:00 pm	Netstrata Jubilee Stadium	Matt Cecchin, Jon Stone	0^{a}
Brisbane Broncos	22–18	South Sydney Rabbitohs	Friday, 20 March, 8:05 pm	Suncorp Stadium	Grant Atkins, Peter Gough	0^{a}
New Zealand Warriors	6–20	Canberra Raiders	Saturday, 21 March, 3:00 pm	Cbus Super Stadium	Chris Sutton, David Munro	0^{a}
Sydney Roosters	8–9	Manly-Warringah Sea Eagles	Saturday, 21 March, 5:30 pm	Leichhardt Oval	Ben Cummins, Belinda Sharpe	0^{a}
Cronulla-Sutherland Sharks	10–12	Melbourne Storm	Saturday, 21 March, 7:35 pm	Netstrata Jubilee Stadium	Ashley Klein, Phil Henderson	0^{a}
Wests Tigers	24–42	Newcastle Knights	Sunday, 22 March, 4:05 pm	Leichhardt Oval	Gerard Sutton, Gavin Badger	0^{a}
Gold Coast Titans	6–46	Parramatta Eels	Sunday, 22 March, 6:15 pm	Cbus Super Stadium	Henry Perenara, Ziggy Przeklasa-Adamski	0^{a}

=== Round 3 ===
Home	Score	Away	Match information			
Home	Score	Away	Date and time	Venue	Referees	Attendance
Brisbane Broncos	6–34	Parramatta Eels	Thursday, 28 May, 7:50 pm	Suncorp Stadium	Gerard Sutton	0^{a}
North Queensland Cowboys	36–6	Gold Coast Titans	Friday, 29 May, 6:00 pm	Queensland Country Bank Stadium	Henry Perenara	0^{a}
Sydney Roosters	28–12	South Sydney Rabbitohs	Friday, 29 May, 7:55 pm	Bankwest Stadium	Ashley Klein	0^{a}
New Zealand Warriors	18–0	St. George Illawarra Dragons	Saturday, 30 May, 3:00 pm	Central Coast Stadium	Chris Sutton	0^{a}
Cronulla-Sutherland Sharks	16–28	Wests Tigers	Saturday, 30 May, 5:30 pm	Bankwest Stadium	Adam Gee	0^{a}
Melbourne Storm	6–22	Canberra Raiders	Saturday, 30 May, 7:35 pm	AAMI Park	Grant Atkins	0^{a}
Penrith Panthers	14–14	Newcastle Knights	Sunday, 31 May, 4:05 pm	Campbelltown Stadium	Ben Cummins	0^{a}
Manly Warringah Sea Eagles	32–6	Canterbury-Bankstown Bulldogs	Sunday, 31 May, 6:30 pm	Central Coast Stadium	Matt Cecchin	0^{a}

- All matches held this round included a minute's silence following the passing of league legend Arthur Summons.

=== Round 4 ===
Home	Score	Away	Match information			
Home	Score	Away	Date and time	Venue	Referees	Attendance
Brisbane Broncos	0–59	Sydney Roosters	Thursday, 4 June, 7:50 pm	Suncorp Stadium	Grant Atkins	0^{a}
Penrith Panthers	26–0	New Zealand Warriors	Friday, 5 June, 6:00 pm	Campbelltown Stadium	Matt Cecchin	0^{a}
Melbourne Storm	22–8	South Sydney Rabbitohs	Friday, 5 June, 7:55 pm	AAMI Park	Gerard Sutton	0^{a}
Parramatta Eels	19–16	Manly Warringah Sea Eagles	Saturday, 6 June, 5:30 pm	Bankwest Stadium	Ben Cummins	0^{a}
North Queensland Cowboys	16–26	Cronulla-Sutherland Sharks	Saturday, 6 June, 7:35 pm	Queensland Country Bank Stadium	Chris Sutton	0^{a}
Canberra Raiders	18–34	Newcastle Knights	Sunday, 7 June, 4:05 pm	Campbelltown Stadium	Ashley Klein	0^{a}
Gold Coast Titans	28–23	Wests Tigers	Sunday, 7 June, 6:30 pm	Suncorp Stadium	Adam Gee	0^{a}
Canterbury-Bankstown Bulldogs	22–2	St. George Illawarra Dragons	Monday, 8 June, 4:05 pm	Bankwest Stadium	Henry Perenara	0^{a}

- The Sydney Roosters handed the Brisbane Broncos their biggest ever loss and the Broncos were held scoreless at Suncorp Stadium for the first time in their history. It was also the Roosters' biggest win since round 6, 1996.

=== Round 5 ===
Home	Score	Away	Match information			
Home	Score	Away	Date and time	Venue	Referees	Attendance (where known)
Manly Warringah Sea Eagles	20–18	Brisbane Broncos	Thursday, 11 June, 7:50 pm	Central Coast Stadium	Ashley Klein	166
New Zealand Warriors	37–26	North Queensland Cowboys	Friday, 12 June, 6:00 pm	Central Coast Stadium	Adam Gee	21
Parramatta Eels	16–10	Penrith Panthers	Friday, 12 June, 7:55 pm	Bankwest Stadium	Gerard Sutton	507
South Sydney Rabbitohs	32–12	Gold Coast Titans	Saturday, 13 June, 3:00 pm	Bankwest Stadium	Matt Cecchin	401
Newcastle Knights	12–26	Melbourne Storm	Saturday, 13 June, 5:30 pm	Central Coast Stadium	Ben Cummins	194
Wests Tigers	6–14	Canberra Raiders	Saturday, 13 June, 7:35 pm	Campbelltown Stadium	Chris Sutton	109
St. George Illawarra Dragons	30–16	Cronulla-Sutherland Sharks	Sunday, 14 June, 4:05 pm	Campbelltown Stadium	Henry Perenara	103
Canterbury-Bankstown Bulldogs	6–42	Sydney Roosters	Monday, 15 June, 7:00 pm	Bankwest Stadium	Grant Atkins	366

- Manly recovered from an 0–18 deficit just prior to halftime
- Crowds were permitted back in stadiums, albeit in limit numbers in corporate boxes only.
- The Bulldogs vs Roosters clash was postponed due to one of the player's children attending a school where someone tested positive to COVID-19. The Dragons vs Sharks game was shifted to start at 4:05 pm as opposed to their original 6:30 pm timeslot.

=== Round 6 ===
Home	Score	Away	Match information			
Home	Score	Away	Date and time	Venue	Referees	Attendance (where known)
Newcastle Knights	27–6	Brisbane Broncos	Thursday, 18 June, 7:50 pm	Central Coast Stadium	Gerard Sutton	177
South Sydney Rabbitohs	40–12	New Zealand Warriors	Friday, 19 June, 6:00 pm	Bankwest Stadium	Matt Cecchin	437
Penrith Panthers	21–14	Melbourne Storm	Friday, 19 June, 7:55 pm	Campbelltown Stadium	Ashley Klein	115
Gold Coast Titans	8–20	St. George Illawarra Dragons	Saturday, 20 June, 3:00 pm	Suncorp Stadium	Chris Sutton	1,930
Wests Tigers	36–20	North Queensland Cowboys	Saturday, 20 June, 5:30 pm	Campbelltown Stadium	Henry Perenara	104
Sydney Roosters	24–10	Parramatta Eels	Saturday, 20 June, 7:35 pm	Bankwest Stadium	Ben Cummins	566
Canberra Raiders	6–14	Manly Warringah Sea Eagles	Sunday, 21 June, 4:05 pm	Campbelltown Stadium	Grant Atkins	
Cronulla-Sutherland Sharks	20–18	Canterbury-Bankstown Bulldogs	Sunday, 21 June, 6:30 pm	Bankwest Stadium	Adam Gee	410

- Stephen Kearney was sacked as coach of New Zealand after their loss to South Sydney.

=== Round 7 ===
Home	Score	Away	Match information			
Home	Score	Away	Date and time	Venue	Referees	Attendance (where known)
Penrith Panthers	20–12	South Sydney Rabbitohs	Thursday, 25 June, 7:50 pm	Netstrata Jubilee Stadium	Gerard Sutton	106
Melbourne Storm	50–6	New Zealand Warriors	Friday, 26 June, 6:00 pm	Netstrata Jubilee Stadium	Ben Cummins	90
Sydney Roosters	26–12	St. George Illawarra Dragons	Friday, 26 June, 7:55 pm	Bankwest Stadium	Grant Atkins	494
North Queensland Cowboys	32–20	Newcastle Knights	Saturday, 27 June, 3:00 pm	Queensland Country Bank Stadium	Matt Cecchin	1,853
Brisbane Broncos	12–30	Gold Coast Titans	Saturday, 27 June, 5:30 pm	Suncorp Stadium	Peter Gough	6,262
Parramatta Eels	25–24	Canberra Raiders	Saturday, 27 June, 7:35 pm	Bankwest Stadium	Ashley Klein	560
Manly Warringah Sea Eagles	22–40	Cronulla-Sutherland Sharks	Sunday, 28 June, 4:05 pm	Central Coast Stadium	Adam Gee	178
Canterbury-Bankstown Bulldogs	6–34	Wests Tigers	Sunday, 28 June, 6:30 pm	Bankwest Stadium	Henry Perenara	519

- The Penrith vs South Sydney match was originally meant to be held at Campbelltown Stadium but was moved to Netstrata Jubilee Stadium due to concerns about the playing surface at Campbelltown.
- The Storm vs Warriors match was originally meant to be held at AAMI Park but was moved to Netstrata Jubilee Stadium due to the high numbers of COVID-19 cases in Victoria compared to NSW & Queensland.
- The Wests Tigers played their 500th NRL game in their match against Canterbury.

=== Round 8 ===
Home	Score	Away	Match information			
Home	Score	Away	Date and time	Venue	Referees	Attendance (where known)
Melbourne Storm	27–25	Sydney Roosters	Thursday, 2 July, 7:50 pm	Suncorp Stadium	Ashley Klein	5 268
Canberra Raiders	22–16	St. George Illawarra Dragons	Friday, 3 July, 6:00 pm	GIO Stadium	Matt Cecchin	1 420
Parramatta Eels	42–4	North Queensland Cowboys	Friday, 3 July, 7:55 pm	Bankwest Stadium	Ben Cummins	6 730
Gold Coast Titans	10–40	Cronulla-Sutherland Sharks	Saturday, 4 July, 3:00 pm	Cbus Super Stadium	Chris Sutton	1 995
New Zealand Warriors	26–16	Brisbane Broncos	Saturday, 4 July, 5:30 pm	Central Coast Stadium	Chris Butler	2 513
Wests Tigers	12–19	Penrith Panthers	Saturday, 4 July, 7:35 pm	Bankwest Stadium	Adam Gee	3 960
Manly Warringah Sea Eagles	12–14	Newcastle Knights	Sunday, 5 July, 4:05 pm	Lottoland	Grant Atkins	2 271
Canterbury-Bankstown Bulldogs	10–26	South Sydney Rabbitohs	Sunday, 5 July, 6:30 pm	Bankwest Stadium	Peter Gough	3 585

- As of this round with the exception of Melbourne and New Zealand, all clubs were allowed to play at their home grounds again.
- Addin Fonua-Blake was sent off in Manly's game against Newcastle.

=== Round 9 ===
Home	Score	Away	Match information			
Home	Score	Away	Date and time	Venue	Referees	Attendance (where known)
North Queensland Cowboys	16–42	Sydney Roosters	Thursday, 9 July, 7:50 pm	Queensland Country Bank Stadium	Adam Gee	6,478
Gold Coast Titans	16–12	New Zealand Warriors	Friday, 10 July, 6:00 pm	Cbus Super Stadium	Chris Butler	5,206
South Sydney Rabbitohs	18–10	Wests Tigers	Friday, 10 July, 7:55 pm	Bankwest Stadium	Ben Cummins	4,864
Cronulla-Sutherland Sharks	24–56	Penrith Panthers	Saturday, 11 July, 3:00 pm	Netstrata Jubilee Stadium	Ashley Klein	3,277
Brisbane Broncos	26–8	Canterbury-Bankstown Bulldogs	Saturday, 11 July, 5:30 pm	Suncorp Stadium	Chris Sutton	7,134
Canberra Raiders	14–20	Melbourne Storm	Saturday, 11 July, 7:35 pm	GIO Stadium	Grant Atkins	
Newcastle Knights	4–10	Parramatta Eels	Sunday, 12 July, 4:05 pm	McDonald Jones Stadium	Gerard Sutton	6,980
St. George Illawarra Dragons	34–4	Manly Warringah Sea Eagles	Sunday, 12 July, 6:30 pm	Netstrata Jubilee Stadium	Matt Cecchin	1,571

- Matt Ikuvalu became the first Sydney Roosters player to score 5 tries in a game since 1955.
- Charlie Staines became the first player to score four tries on debut since 2008.
- Dean Pay resigned as Canterbury Bulldogs coach after Canterbury's loss to the Brisbane Broncos.

=== Round 10 ===
Home	Score	Away	Match information			
Home	Score	Away	Date and time	Venue	Referees	Attendance (where known)
Sydney Roosters	20–24	Canberra Raiders	Thursday, 16 July, 7:50 pm	Sydney Cricket Ground	Gerard Sutton	3,746
Melbourne Storm	42–6	Gold Coast Titans	Friday, 17 July, 6:00 pm	Sunshine Coast Stadium	Chris Sutton	6,000
Wests Tigers	48–0	Brisbane Broncos	Friday, 17 July, 7:55 pm	Leichhardt Oval	Adam Gee	2,633
St. George Illawarra Dragons	28–22	Canterbury-Bankstown Bulldogs	Saturday, 18 July, 3:00 pm	WIN Stadium	Henry Perenara	1,619
South Sydney Rabbitohs	18–20	Newcastle Knights	Saturday, 18 July, 5:30 pm	Bankwest Stadium	Grant Atkins	4,249
Manly Warringah Sea Eagles	22–18	Parramatta Eels	Saturday, 18 July, 7:35 pm	Lottoland	Ashley Klein	2,021
New Zealand Warriors	10–46	Cronulla-Sutherland Sharks	Sunday, 19 July, 2:00 pm	Central Coast Stadium	Matt Cecchin	
Penrith Panthers	22–10	North Queensland Cowboys	Sunday, 19 July, 4:05 pm	Panthers Stadium	Ben Cummins	2,891

- The Wests Tigers recorded their biggest win since round 21, 2008.
- Paul Green stepped down as Cowboys coach following their loss to the Penrith Panthers.

=== Round 11 ===
Home	Score	Away	Match information			
Home	Score	Away	Date and time	Venue	Referees	Attendance (where known)
Parramatta Eels	26–16	Wests Tigers	Thursday, 23 July, 7:50 pm	Bankwest Stadium	Gerard Sutton	6,403
North Queensland Cowboys	12–24	Manly Warringah Sea Eagles	Friday, 24 July, 6:00 pm	Queensland Country Bank Stadium	Henry Perenara	7,127
Brisbane Broncos	8–46	Melbourne Storm	Friday, 24 July, 7:55 pm	Suncorp Stadium	Ben Cummins	9,710
New Zealand Warriors	10–18	Sydney Roosters	Saturday, 25 July, 3:00 pm	Central Coast Stadium	Chris Sutton	
Cronulla-Sutherland Sharks	28–24	St. George Illawarra Dragons	Saturday, 25 July, 5:30 pm	Netstrata Jubilee Stadium	Grant Atkins	3,179
Canberra Raiders	18–12	South Sydney Rabbitohs	Saturday, 25 July, 7:35 pm	GIO Stadium	Ashley Klein	
Newcastle Knights	12–18	Canterbury-Bankstown Bulldogs	Sunday, 26 July, 2:00 pm	McDonald Jones Stadium	Matt Cecchin	3,521
Gold Coast Titans	14–22	Penrith Panthers	Sunday, 26 July, 4:05 pm	Cbus Super Stadium	Adam Gee	

=== Round 12 ===
Home	Score	Away	Match information			
Home	Score	Away	Date and time	Venue	Referees	Attendance (where known)
St. George Illawarra Dragons	24–32	South Sydney Rabbitohs	Thursday, 30 July, 7:50 pm	Netstrata Jubilee Stadium	Ashley Klein	2,719
Wests Tigers	20–26	New Zealand Warriors	Friday, 31 July, 6:00 pm	Sydney Cricket Ground	Peter Gough	
Brisbane Broncos	26–36	Cronulla-Sutherland Sharks	Friday, 31 July, 7:55 pm	Suncorp Stadium	Matt Cecchin	7,390
Sydney Roosters	18–12	Gold Coast Titans	Saturday, 1 August, 3:00 pm	Sydney Cricket Ground	Henry Perenara	
North Queensland Cowboys	12–14	Canberra Raiders	Saturday, 1 August, 5:30 pm	Queensland Country Bank Stadium	Ben Cummins	7,586
Manly Warringah Sea Eagles	12–42	Penrith Panthers	Saturday, 1 August, 7:35 pm	Lottoland	Gerard Sutton	2,729
Canterbury-Bankstown Bulldogs	16–18	Parramatta Eels	Sunday, 2 August, 2:00 pm	ANZ Stadium	Chris Sutton	5,775
Melbourne Storm	26–16	Newcastle Knights	Sunday, 2 August, 4:05 pm	Sunshine Coast Stadium	Adam Gee	5,437

=== Round 13 ===
Home	Score	Away	Match information			
Home	Score	Away	Date and time	Venue	Referees	Attendance (where known)
St. George Illawarra Dragons	16–24	Sydney Roosters	Thursday, 6 August, 7:50 pm	WIN Stadium	Ashley Klein	
Manly Warringah Sea Eagles	22–26	New Zealand Warriors	Friday, 7 August, 6:00 pm	Lottoland	Henry Perenara	1,340
South Sydney Rabbitohs	28–10	Brisbane Broncos	Friday, 7 August, 7:55 pm	ANZ Stadium	Grant Atkins	2,919
Melbourne Storm	41–10	Canterbury-Bankstown Bulldogs	Saturday, 8 August, 3:00 pm	Sunshine Coast Stadium	Peter Gough	3,440
Newcastle Knights	44–4	Wests Tigers	Saturday, 8 August, 5:30 pm	McDonald Jones Stadium	Matt Cecchin	2,952
Penrith Panthers	28–12	Canberra Raiders	Saturday, 8 August, 7:35 pm	Panthers Stadium	Gerard Sutton	
Gold Coast Titans	30–10	North Queensland Cowboys	Sunday, 9 August, 2:00 pm	Cbus Super Stadium	Chris Sutton	5,646
Cronulla-Sutherland Sharks	12–14	Parramatta Eels	Sunday, 9 August, 4:05 pm	Netstrata Jubilee Stadium	Ben Cummins	1,714

- Des Hasler coached his 400th NRL game in Manly's loss to New Zealand.
- Jason Demetriou, who is slated to take over from Wayne Bennett as head coach of the South Sydney Rabbitohs at the end of the 2021 NRL season, made his coaching debut for the Rabbitohs in this round after Bennett was stood down for breaching the NRL's COVID-19 protocols.
- Anthony Seibold coached his last game for the Brisbane Broncos as he went into self isolation after the Brisbane's game against Souths in accordance with the Queensland Government's COVID regulations as he delayed his return to Queensland for family reasons. He would resign as coach after coming out of isolation.
- Gold Coast ended a 10-game losing streak against North Queensland, which was their longest losing steak against any side to date.

=== Round 14 ===
Home	Score	Away	Match information			
Home	Score	Away	Date and time	Venue	Referees	Attendance (where known)
Sydney Roosters	6–24	Melbourne Storm	Thursday, 13 August, 7:50 pm	Sydney Cricket Ground	Gerard Sutton	
New Zealand Warriors	12–18	Penrith Panthers	Friday, 14 August, 6:00 pm	Central Coast Stadium	Adam Gee	
Parramatta Eels	12–14	St. George Illawarra Dragons	Friday, 14 August, 7:55 pm	Bankwest Stadium	Grant Atkins	6,290
Cronulla-Sutherland Sharks	30–18	Gold Coast Titans	Saturday, 15 August, 3:00 pm	Netstrata Jubilee Stadium	Henry Perenara	
North Queensland Cowboys	30–31	South Sydney Rabbitohs	Saturday, 15 August, 5:30 pm	Queensland Country Bank Stadium	Chris Butler	7,611
Canberra Raiders	36–8	Brisbane Broncos	Saturday, 15 August, 7:35 pm	GIO Stadium	Chris Sutton	
Newcastle Knights	26–24	Manly Warringah Sea Eagles	Sunday, 16 August, 2:00 pm	McDonald Jones Stadium	Ashley Klein	
Wests Tigers	29–28	Canterbury-Bankstown Bulldogs	Sunday, 16 August, 4:05 pm	Bankwest Stadium	Matt Cecchin	3,756

- Penrith won 9 matches in a row for the first time in their history.
- Paul McGregor coached his last game for St George Illawarra after announcing his departure in the lead up to their game against Parramatta.
- Kevin Proctor was sent off in his 250th NRL game.

=== Round 15 ===
Home	Score	Away	Match information			
Home	Score	Away	Date and time	Venue	Referees	Attendance (where known)
Parramatta Eels	14–0	Melbourne Storm	Thursday, 20 August, 7:50 pm	Bankwest Stadium	Ben Cummins	6,282
Penrith Panthers	38–12	Cronulla-Sutherland Sharks	Friday, 21 August, 6:00 pm	Panthers Stadium	Ashley Klein	
Brisbane Broncos	24–28	St. George Illawarra Dragons	Friday, 21 August, 7:55 pm	Suncorp Stadium	Henry Perenara	7,074
Gold Coast Titans	16–36	Canberra Raiders	Saturday, 22 August, 3:00 pm	Cbus Super Stadium	Chris Butler	6,561
Wests Tigers	16–38	Sydney Roosters	Saturday, 22 August, 5:30 pm	Leichhardt Oval	Grant Atkins	3,003
South Sydney Rabbitohs	56–16	Manly Warringah Sea Eagles	Saturday, 22 August, 7:35 pm	ANZ Stadium	Gerard Sutton	4,712
Canterbury-Bankstown Bulldogs	14–20	New Zealand Warriors	Sunday, 23 August, 2:00 pm	ANZ Stadium	Peter Gough	2,631
Newcastle Knights	12–0	North Queensland Cowboys	Sunday, 23 August, 4:05 pm	McDonald Jones Stadium	Adam Gee	5,304

- Trent Robinson coached his 200th NRL game.
- South Sydney recorded their biggest ever win over Manly with the latter recording their biggest loss since round 24, 2005 which was also the last time a Des Hasler coached side conceded 50 points in a match.
- North Queensland were kept scoreless for the first time since Round 1, 2012.

=== Round 16 ===
Home	Score	Away	Match information			
Home	Score	Away	Date and time	Venue	Referees	Attendance (where known)
Parramatta Eels	0–38	South Sydney Rabbitohs	Thursday, 27 August, 7:50 pm	Bankwest Stadium	Gerard Sutton	7,012
St. George Illawarra Dragons	10–14	Gold Coast Titans	Friday, 28 August, 6:00 pm	Netstrata Jubilee Stadium	Henry Perenara	2,097
Sydney Roosters	58–12	Brisbane Broncos	Friday, 28 August, 7:55 pm	Sydney Cricket Ground	Adam Gee	3,841
New Zealand Warriors	36–6	Newcastle Knights	Saturday, 29 August, 3:00 pm	Scully Park	Matt Cecchin	
Cronulla-Sutherland Sharks	28–12	North Queensland Cowboys	Saturday, 29 August, 5:30 pm	Netstrata Jubilee Stadium	Chris Sutton	
Penrith Panthers	30–6	Wests Tigers	Saturday, 29 August, 7:35 pm	Panthers Stadium	Ben Cummins	3,699
Melbourne Storm	30–6	Manly Warringah Sea Eagles	Sunday, 30 August, 4:05 pm	Sunshine Coast Stadium	Grant Atkins	2,910
Canberra Raiders	34–20	Canterbury-Bankstown Bulldogs	Sunday, 30 August, 6:30 pm	GIO Stadium	Chris Butler	

=== Round 17 ===
Home	Score	Away	Match information			
Home	Score	Away	Date and time	Venue	Referees	Attendance (where known)
Brisbane Broncos	12–25	Penrith Panthers	Thursday, 3 September, 7:50 pm	Suncorp Stadium	Matt Cecchin	5,626
Newcastle Knights	38–10	Cronulla-Sutherland Sharks	Friday, 4 September, 6:00 pm	McDonald Jones Stadium	Ben Cummins	5,597
South Sydney Rabbitohs	16–22	Melbourne Storm	Friday, 4 September, 7:55 pm	ANZ Stadium	Ashley Klein	
Canterbury-Bankstown Bulldogs	14–18	Gold Coast Titans	Saturday, 5 September, 3:00 pm	ANZ Stadium	Chris Sutton	
Manly Warringah Sea Eagles	32–34	Wests Tigers	Saturday, 5 September, 5:30 pm	Lottoland	Henry Perenara	
Canberra Raiders	6–18	Sydney Roosters	Saturday, 5 September, 7:35 pm	GIO Stadium	Gerard Sutton	
New Zealand Warriors	18–24	Parramatta Eels	Sunday, 6 September, 4:05 pm	Central Coast Stadium	Grant Atkins	4,577
North Queensland Cowboys	23–22	St. George Illawarra Dragons	Sunday, 6 September, 6:30 pm	Queensland Country Bank Stadium	Adam Gee	6,755

- Chad Townsend was sent off for a shoulder charge in Cronulla's 28 point loss against Newcastle

=== Round 18 ===
Home	Score	Away	Match information			
Home	Score	Away	Date and time	Venue	Referees	Attendance (where known)
Wests Tigers	24–26	South Sydney Rabbitohs	Thursday, 10 September, 7:50 pm	Bankwest Stadium	Ben Cummins	3 801
Canterbury-Bankstown Bulldogs	20–32	Manly Warringah Sea Eagles	Friday, 11 September, 6:00 pm	ANZ Stadium	Matt Noyen	2,151
Penrith Panthers	20–2	Parramatta Eels	Friday, 11 September, 7:55 pm	Panthers Stadium	Gerard Sutton	3,955
St. George Illawarra Dragons	8–37	Canberra Raiders	Saturday, 12 September, 3:00 pm	WIN Stadium	Adam Gee −−−> Matt Cecchin	2 588
Gold Coast Titans	18–6	Brisbane Broncos	Saturday, 12 September, 5:30 pm	Cbus Super Stadium	Henry Perenara	9 729
Sydney Roosters	42–12	Newcastle Knights	Saturday, 12 September, 7:35 pm	Sydney Cricket Ground	Ashley Klein	
Melbourne Storm	36–20	North Queensland Cowboys	Sunday, 13 September, 4:05 pm	Sunshine Coast Stadium	Grant Atkins	4,056
Cronulla-Sutherland Sharks	22–14	New Zealand Warriors	Sunday, 13 September, 6:30 pm	Netstrata Jubilee Stadium	Matt Cecchin	2 306

- Adam Gee succumbed to a calf injury at half time and had to be replaced by stand-by referee Matt Cecchin for the second half.
- The Gold Coast Titans defeated the Brisbane Broncos twice in a season and in consecutive matches for the first time in the history of any Gold Coast club.

=== Round 19 ===
Home	Score	Away	Match information			
Home	Score	Away	Date and time	Venue	Referees	Attendance (where known)
South Sydney Rabbitohs	16–26	Canterbury-Bankstown Bulldogs	Thursday, 17 September, 7:50 pm	ANZ Stadium	Ashley Klein	4,859
North Queensland Cowboys	12–32	Penrith Panthers	Friday, 18 September, 6:00 pm	Queensland Country Bank Stadium	Matt Cecchin	7,247
Parramatta Eels	26–12	Brisbane Broncos	Friday, 18 September, 7:55 pm	Bankwest Stadium	Henry Perenara	6,617
Manly Warringah Sea Eagles	24–42	Gold Coast Titans	Saturday, 19 September, 3:00 pm	Lottoland	Matt Noyen −−−> Dave Munro	
Melbourne Storm	50–22	Wests Tigers	Saturday, 19 September, 5:30 pm	Sunshine Coast Stadium	Gerard Sutton	
Sydney Roosters	34–18	Cronulla-Sutherland Sharks	Saturday, 19 September, 7:35 pm	Sydney Cricket Ground	Ben Cummins	
Canberra Raiders	26–14	New Zealand Warriors	Sunday, 20 September, 2:00 pm	GIO Stadium	Chris Sutton	3,900
Newcastle Knights	42–18	St. George Illawarra Dragons	Sunday, 20 September, 4:05 pm	McDonald Jones Stadium	Grant Atkins	6,659

- The Panthers secured their first minor premiership since 2003 by defeating North Queensland.
- Matt Noyen received a calf injury in the 12th minute of the Sea Eagles vs Titans game. He was replaced by Dave Munro in the 14th minute. Noyen did not return.
- The Melbourne Storm played their 600th NRL match.

=== Round 20 ===
Home	Score	Away	Match information			
Home	Score	Away	Date and time	Venue	Referees	Attendance (where known)
Brisbane Broncos	16–32	North Queensland Cowboys	Thursday, 24 September, 7:50 pm	Suncorp Stadium	Grant Atkins	17,174
Gold Coast Titans	36–6	Newcastle Knights	Friday, 25 September, 6:00 pm	Cbus Super Stadium	Chris Sutton	9,877
South Sydney Rabbitohs	60–8	Sydney Roosters	Friday, 25 September, 7:55 pm	ANZ Stadium	Gerard Sutton	7,958
Canterbury-Bankstown Bulldogs	0–42	Penrith Panthers	Saturday, 26 September, 3:00 pm	ANZ Stadium	Henry Perenara	
Cronulla-Sutherland Sharks	28–38	Canberra Raiders	Saturday, 26 September, 5:30 pm	Netstrata Jubilee Stadium	Ashley Klein	
Wests Tigers	24–28	Parramatta Eels	Saturday, 26 September, 7:35 pm	Bankwest Stadium	Ben Cummins	7,539
New Zealand Warriors	40–28	Manly Warringah Sea Eagles	Sunday, 27 September, 2:00 pm	Central Coast Stadium	Adam Gee	
St. George Illawarra Dragons	30–22	Melbourne Storm	Sunday, 27 September, 4:05 pm	Netstrata Jubilee Stadium	Matt Cecchin	2,738

- In the lead-up to Round 20, the Australian Rugby League Commission approved a number of experimental rule changes to be trialled in two matches during the final round of the regular season. The Commission approved the following experimental rules to be trialled in the Brisbane Broncos v North Queensland Cowboys game on Thursday night and the New Zealand Warriors v Manly Sea Eagles game on Sunday afternoon. Neither match will have an impact on the Top 8. The experimental rule changes are:
  - Use of the “Six Again” rule for 10 metre infringements.
  - Handover for kicks into touch rather than a scrum.
  - Nominated Forwards only in the scrum.
  - Change in Bunker referral process to reduce stoppages.
- The Brisbane Broncos claimed their first wooden spoon after losing to the North Queensland Cowboys 32–16. It was their eleventh consecutive defeat to finish the season.
- South Sydney scored 60 points in a game for the first time since 1937 and recorded their biggest ever win over the Sydney Roosters in the process.

== Finals series ==
=== Chart ===
Qualifying and elimination finals
2 Oct, Panthers Stadium
1	Penrith	29
4	Sydney	28
3 Oct, GIO Stadium Canberra
5	Canberra	32
8	Cronulla-Sutherland	20
4 Oct, ANZ Stadium
6	South Sydney	46
7	Newcastle	20
3 Oct, Suncorp Stadium
2	Melbourne	36
3	Parramatta	24

Semi-finals
9 Oct, Sydney Cricket Ground
Sydney	18
Canberra	22
10 Oct, Bankwest Stadium
Parramatta	24
South Sydney	38

Preliminary finals
17 Oct, ANZ Stadium
Penrith	20
South Sydney	16
16 Oct, Suncorp Stadium
Melbourne	30
Canberra	10

Grand final
25 Oct, ANZ Stadium
Penrith	20
Melbourne	26

== Grand Final ==
2020 NRL Grand Final

Sunday, 25 October
19:40 AEDT (UTC+11)

Penrith Panthers	20 – 26	Melbourne Storm
Tries: 4 To'o 52'; Crichton 68'; Mansour 71'; Cleary 79'; Goals: 2 Cleary 53', 69' (2/3)	1st: 0–22; 2nd: 20–4; Report	Tries: 4 Olam (penalty) 3'; Vunivalu 30'; C. Smith 39'; Papenhuzen 45'; Goals: 5 C. Smith 4', pen 22', pen 26', 31', 40' (5/6); Sin bin: Hughes (yellow card) 70' to 80'; B. Smith (yellow card) 79' to 80'

ANZ Stadium, Sydney
Attendance: 37,303
Referee: Gerard Sutton
Touch judges: Chris Butler, Todd Smith
Clive Churchill Medal: Ryan Papenhuyzen (Melbourne)

== Notes ==
^{a} From round 2 to round 4, all matches were played behind closed doors due to the COVID-19 pandemic.
