= Western Sydney Derby =

Rivalry between the Parramatta Eels & Penrith Panthers in the NRL

- Location: Western Sydney, Australia
- Teams: Parramatta Eels & Penrith Panthers
- First meeting: Parramatta 5–6 Penrith (5 March 1967)
- Latest meeting: Panthers 48-20 Eels (28 March 2026)

Statistics
- Total meetings: 118
- Most wins: Parramatta Eels (66)
- All-time series: Parramatta: 66 wins Penrith: 52 wins Drawn: 1
- Largest victory: Parramatta 64–6 Penrith (17 March 2002)

The Western Sydney Derby is the rivalry between the Parramatta Eels and the Penrith Panthers in the National Rugby League.

== History ==
Parramatta entered the NSWRL now NRL competition in 1947, meanwhile Penrith entered 20 years later in 1967. Parramatta are the closest NRL team to Penrith geographically.

Former Penrith and current Parramatta player Reagan Campbell-Gillard spoke about Penrith and Parramatta saying "As a Penrith junior, you come through the system to hate them. “I also don't like that word but it is. It doesn't matter what form you're in, it's a game you get up for".

In 2002, Parramatta thrashed the Penrith 64–6, this coming after a season in which Parramatta finished first on the ladder and Penrith last. But they would not meet again until Round 26, 2003, when Penrith, in front of a then-record crowd defeated Parramatta 40–22 denying the Eels a place in the finals (Parramatta had to win by 28+ points). Penrith went on to win the premiership that year. Round 17, 2009 saw a Penrith win by 38–34 in which the lead changed several times, before Parramatta recorded a huge 48–6 win in the penultimate round of the 2009 NRL season.

In the 2010 NRL season, Parramatta came from 22–0 down at half-time against Penrith to win 34–28 at Penrith Park with Parramatta player Jarryd Hayne starring with a man of the match performance.

Since Penrith entered the competition in 1967, the two clubs have played each other five times in the finals. The last being the 2022 NRL Grand Final which Penrith won 28-12. In round 5 of the 2020 NRL season, Parramatta came back from a 10–0 deficit at the 61st minute to beat Penrith 16–10, that would be Penrith's only loss in the 2020 NRL regular season that year as Penrith finished as minor premiers.

In round 9 of the 2022 NRL season, Parramatta defeated Penrith 22-20 at Penrith Park. It was Penrith's first loss of the season and it also ended the clubs 21-match winning streak at the ground. Parramatta were the only team to defeat Penrith twice in the 2022 NRL season. The two teams met twice in the finals series, with Penrith winning both matches en route to their second consecutive premiership.

In round 4 of the 2023 NRL season, Parramatta met Penrith in the grand final rematch. Parramatta went into the game having started the season winless. Parramatta lead the match 16-8 with less than seven minutes to play but Penrith levelled the scores at 16-16 after Nathan Cleary kicked a 40 metre field goal with seconds remaining. In golden point extra-time, Mitchell Moses kicked a field goal to win the game for Parramatta 17-16. In round 26, Parramatta pulled off one of the upsets of the season, defeating Penrith 32-18. Before the match, Penrith were sitting top of the table meanwhile Parramatta were sat 11th on the table and were unable to qualify for the finals. In round 23 of the 2024 NRL season, Penrith staged one of the best comebacks in recent memory as they came from 16 points down to defeat Parramatta 36-34. Penrith scored three converted tries in six minutes to claim the victory.

== Results ==
| Team | Played | Won | Drawn | PS | PD |
|---|---|---|---|---|---|
| Parramatta Eels | 128 | 69 | 1 | 2358 | +248 |
| Penrith Panthers | 128 | 58 | 1 | 2110 | -248 |

As of 28 March 2026

=== NRL results ===
F1= Finals Week 1, EF= Elimination Final, PF= Premliminary Final, GF= Grand Final
| Date | Season | Round | Home team | Score | Away team | Venue | Attendance | Report |
|---|---|---|---|---|---|---|---|---|
| Sunday, 28 May | 1967 | 10 | Parramatta Eels | 25 – 2 | Penrith Panthers | Cumberland Oval | 12,917 | |
| Saturday, 12 August | 1967 | 21 | Penrith Panthers | 9 – 18 | Parramatta Eels | Penrith Stadium | 5,368 | |
| Sunday, 14 July | 1968 | 16 | Penrith Panthers | 14 – 12 | Parramatta Eels | Penrith Stadium | 13,163 | |
| Sunday, 30 March | 1969 | 1 | Penrith Panthers | 10 – 21 | Parramatta Eels | Penrith Stadium | 11,338 | |
| Sunday, 15 June | 1969 | 12 | Parramatta Eels | 8 – 10 | Penrith Panthers | Cumberland Oval | 14,572 | |
| Sunday, 12 April | 1970 | 3 | Parramatta Eels | 9 – 12 | Penrith Panthers | Cumberland Oval | 10,065 | |
| Sunday, 28 June | 1970 | 14 | Penrith Panthers | 14 – 12 | Parramatta Eels | Penrith Stadium | 8,825 | |
| Sunday, 18 April | 1971 | 4 | Penrith Panthers | 24 – 12 | Parramatta Eels | Penrith Stadium | 9,125 | |
| Sunday, 4 July | 1971 | 15 | Parramatta Eels | 11 – 0 | Penrith Panthers | Cumberland Oval | 13,375 | |
| Saturday, 13 May | 1972 | 9 | Parramatta Eels | 19 – 12 | Penrith Panthers | Cumberland Oval | 3,174 | |
| Sunday, 6 August | 1972 | 20 | Penrith Panthers | 27 – 15 | Parramatta Eels | Penrith Stadium | 4,100 | |
| Sunday, 6 May | 1973 | 7 | Penrith Panthers | 12 – 21 | Parramatta Eels | Penrith Stadium | 8,676 | |
| Sunday, 22 July | 1973 | 18 | Parramatta Eels | 15 – 29 | Penrith Panthers | Cumberland Oval | 4,381 | |
| Sunday, 19 May | 1974 | 8 | Parramatta Eels | 21 – 5 | Penrith Panthers | Cumberland Oval | 6,526 | |
| Sunday, 4 August | 1974 | 19 | Penrith Panthers | 29 – 21 | Parramatta Eels | Penrith Stadium | 5,931 | |
| Sunday, 4 May | 1975 | 7 | Parramatta Eels | 13 – 8 | Penrith Panthers | Cumberland Oval | 8,949 | |
| Sunday, 27 July | 1975 | 18 | Penrith Panthers | 15 – 30 | Parramatta Eels | Penrith Stadium | 10,290 | |
| Sunday, 30 May | 1976 | 11 | Parramatta Eels | 12 – 10 | Penrith Panthers | Cumberland Oval | 13,570 | |
| Sunday, 22 August | 1976 | 22 | Penrith Panthers | 10 – 11 | Parramatta Eels | Penrith Stadium | 15,342 | |
| Sunday, 1 May | 1977 | 7 | Parramatta Eels | 23 – 4 | Penrith Panthers | Cumberland Oval | 15,288 | |
| Sunday, 24 July | 1977 | 18 | Penrith Panthers | 14 – 33 | Parramatta Eels | Penrith Stadium | 12,308 | |
| Sunday, 21 May | 1978 | 9 | Penrith Panthers | 10 – 19 | Parramatta Eels | Penrith Stadium | 10,859 | |
| Sunday, 6 August | 1978 | 20 | Parramatta Eels | 31 – 7 | Penrith Panthers | Cumberland Oval | 9,140 | |
| Saturday, 5 May | 1979 | 7 | Parramatta Eels | 20 – 11 | Penrith Panthers | Cumberland Oval | 6,992 | |
| Saturday, 21 July | 1979 | 18 | Penrith Panthers | 19 – 22 | Parramatta Eels | Penrith Stadium | 10,732 | |
| Sunday, 4 May | 1980 | 6 | Penrith Panthers | 19 – 19 | Parramatta Eels | Penrith Stadium | 13,423 | |
| Saturday, 14 June | 1980 | 12 | Parramatta Eels | 19 – 9 | Penrith Panthers | Cumberland Oval | 5,775 | |
| Sunday, 27 June | 1981 | 7 | Penrith Panthers | 10 – 13 | Parramatta Eels | Penrith Stadium | 14,736 | |
| Sunday, 2 August | 1981 | 18 | Parramatta Eels | 22 – 5 | Penrith Panthers | Cumberland Oval | 9,682 | |
| Sunday, 21 March | 1982 | 4 | Parramatta Eels | 33 – 9 | Penrith Panthers | Belmore Oval | 6,453 | |
| Sunday, 27 June | 1982 | 18 | Penrith Panthers | 6 – 12 | Parramatta Eels | Penrith Stadium | 16,478 | |
| Saturday, 12 March | 1983 | 3 | Parramatta Eels | 46 – 8 | Penrith Panthers | Belmore Oval | 5,024 | |
| Sunday, 19 June | 1983 | 17 | Penrith Panthers | 4 – 16 | Parramatta Eels | Penrith Stadium | 9,584 | |
| Sunday, 27 May | 1984 | 13 | Parramatta Eels | 10 – 22 | Penrith Panthers | Belmore Oval | 9,086 | |
| Sunday, 26 August | 1984 | 26 | Penrith Panthers | 10 – 22 | Parramatta Eels | Penrith Stadium | 20,523 | |
| Sunday, 21 April | 1985 | 6 | Penrith Panthers | 24 – 16 | Parramatta Eels | Penrith Stadium | 14,607 | |
| Monday, 15 July | 1985 | 19 | Parramatta Eels | 21 – 10 | Penrith Panthers | Sydney Cricket Ground | 8,080 | |
| Sunday, 20 April | 1986 | 7 | Penrith Panthers | 16 – 12 | Parramatta Eels | Penrith Stadium | 15,360 | |
| Sunday, 20 July | 1986 | 20 | Parramatta Eels | 16 – 10 | Penrith Panthers | Parramatta Stadium | 21,049 | |
| Sunday, 24 May | 1987 | 13 | Parramatta Eels | 23 – 10 | Penrith Panthers | Parramatta Stadium | 20,002 | |
| Monday, 31 August | 1987 | 26 | Penrith Panthers | 4 – 30 | Parramatta Eels | Penrith Stadium | 8,155 | |
| Sunday, 27 March | 1988 | 18 | Penrith Panthers | 8 – 6 | Parramatta Eels | Penrith Stadium | 11,611 | |
| Friday, 22 July | 1988 | 19 | Parramatta Eels | 10 – 14 | Penrith Panthers | Parramatta Stadium | 9,174 | |
| Sunday, 2 April | 1989 | 3 | Parramatta Eels | 8 – 6 | Penrith Panthers | Parramatta Stadium | 12,070 | |
| Saturday, 29 July | 1989 | 18 | Penrith Panthers | 11 – 18 | Parramatta Eels | Penrith Stadium | 8,481 | |
| Sunday, 18 March | 1990 | 1 | Parramatta Eels | 19 – 10 | Penrith Panthers | Parramatta Stadium | 15,036 | |
| Saturday, 14 July | 1990 | 16 | Penrith Panthers | 14 – 2 | Parramatta Eels | Penrith Stadium | 13,137 | |
| Sunday, 16 June | 1991 | 12 | Penrith Panthers | 20 – 14 | Parramatta Eels | Penrith Stadium | 12,349 | |
| Sunday, 14 June | 1992 | 11 | Parramatta Eels | 20 – 0 | Penrith Panthers | Parramatta Stadium | 11,006 | |
| Sunday, 14 March | 1993 | 1 | Penrith Panthers | 10 – 11 | Parramatta Eels | Penrith Stadium | 10,782 | |
| Sunday, 16 July | 1993 | 16 | Parramatta Eels | 4 – 22 | Penrith Panthers | Parramatta Stadium | 13,191 | |
| Sunday, 24 April | 1994 | 7 | Parramatta Eels | 10 – 34 | Penrith Panthers | Parramatta Stadium | 12,045 | |
| Sunday, 28 August | 1994 | 22 | Penrith Panthers | 23 – 16 | Parramatta Eels | Penrith Stadium | 10,819 | |
| Sunday, 12 March | 1995 | 1 | Penrith Panthers | 24 – 18 | Parramatta Eels | Penrith Stadium | 10,340 | |
| Sunday, 27 August | 1995 | 22 | Parramatta Eels | 12 – 18 | Penrith Panthers | Parramatta Stadium | 6,020 | |
| Sunday, 30 August | 1996 | 22 | Penrith Panthers | 24 – 16 | Parramatta Eels | Penrith Stadium | 3,870 | |
| Saturday, 14 March | 1998 | 1 | Parramatta Eels | 27 – 16 | Penrith Panthers | Parramatta Stadium | 12,222 | |
| Saturday, 8 August | 1998 | 22 | Penrith Panthers | 14 – 20 | Parramatta Eels | Penrith Stadium | 10,214 | |
| Sunday, 4 April | 1999 | 5 | Penrith Panthers | 13 – 0 | Parramatta Eels | Penrith Stadium | 13,027 | |
| Sunday, 8 August | 1999 | 23 | Parramatta Eels | 17 – 16 | Penrith Panthers | Parramatta Stadium | 19,060 | |
| Saturday, 8 April | 2000 | 10 | Parramatta Eels | 14 – 12 | Penrith Panthers | Parramatta Stadium | 16,172 | |
| Sunday, 7 September | 2000 | 16 | Penrith Panthers | 16 – 14 | Parramatta Eels | Penrith Stadium | 18,371 | |
| Saturday, 17 February | 2001 | 1 | Parramatta Eels | 40 – 4 | Penrith Panthers | ANZ Stadium | 54,833 | |
| Sunday, 27 May | 2001 | 14 | Parramatta Eels | 54 – 28 | Penrith Panthers | Penrith Stadium | 14,019 | |
| Sunday, 17 March | 2002 | 1 | Parramatta Eels | 64 – 6 | Penrith Panthers | Penrith Stadium | 13,348 | |
| Sunday, 7 September | 2003 | 26 | Penrith Panthers | 40 – 22 | Parramatta Eels | Penrith Stadium | 22,304 | |
| Saturday, 26 June | 2004 | 16 | Penrith Panthers | 26 – 16 | Parramatta Eels | Penrith Stadium | 20,567 | |
| Saturday, 28 August | 2004 | 25 | Parramatta Eels | 20 – 30 | Penrith Panthers | Parramatta Stadium | 14,280 | |
| Friday, 1 April | 2005 | 4 | Parramatta Eels | 26 – 16 | Penrith Panthers | Parramatta Stadium | 15,119 | |
| Sunday, 5 June | 2005 | 13 | Penrith Panthers | 22 – 32 | Parramatta Eels | Penrith Stadium | 18,519 | |
| Sunday, 9 April | 2006 | 5 | Parramatta Eels | 18 – 44 | Penrith Panthers | Parramatta Stadium | 14,194 | |
| Friday, 19 May | 2006 | 11 | Penrith Panthers | 30 – 23 | Parramatta Eels | Penrith Stadium | 16,764 | |
| Friday, 13 April | 2007 | 5 | Penrith Panthers | 14 – 27 | Parramatta Eels | Penrith Stadium | 18,746 | |
| Saturday, 3 May | 2008 | 8 | Penrith Panthers | 18 – 26 | Parramatta Eels | Penrith Stadium | 18,724 | |
| Sunday, 6 July | 2008 | 17 | Parramatta Eels | 16 – 22 | Penrith Panthers | Parramatta Stadium | 14,012 | |
| Sunday, 5 July | 2009 | 17 | Penrith Panthers | 38 – 34 | Parramatta Eels | Penrith Stadium | 16,845 | |
| Friday, 28 August | 2009 | 25 | Parramatta Eels | 48 – 6 | Penrith Panthers | Parramatta Stadium | 20,237 | |
| Saturday, 17 July | 2010 | 19 | Penrith Panthers | 28 – 34 | Parramatta Eels | Penrith Stadium | 22,582 | |
| Friday, 18 March | 2011 | 2 | Parramatta Eels | 6 – 20 | Penrith Panthers | Parramatta Stadium | 15,974 | |
| Saturday, 16 July | 2011 | 19 | Penrith Panthers | 23 – 22 | Parramatta Eels | Penrith Stadium | 17,333 | |
| Friday, 23 March | 2012 | 4 | Parramatta Eels | 6 – 39 | Penrith Panthers | Parramatta Stadium | 13,788 | |
| Saturday, 23 June | 2012 | 16 | Penrith Panthers | 18 – 19 | Parramatta Eels | Penrith Stadium | 15,275 | |
| Monday, 29 April | 2013 | 7 | Penrith Panthers | 44 – 12 | Parramatta Eels | Penrith Stadium | 14,211 | |
| Saturday, 29 March | 2014 | 4 | Parramatta Eels | 32 – 16 | Penrith Panthers | Parramatta Stadium | 14,448 | |
| Friday, 29 May | 2014 | 12 | Penrith Panthers | 38 – 12 | Parramatta Eels | Penrith Stadium | 19,141 | |
| Saturday, 29 May | 2015 | 12 | Penrith Panthers | 20 – 26 | Parramatta Eels | Penrith Stadium | 17,821 | |
| Saturday, 8 August | 2015 | 22 | Parramatta Eels | 10 – 4 | Penrith Panthers | TIO Stadium | 8,340 | |
| Sunday, 3 April | 2016 | 5 | Parramatta Eels | 18 – 20 | Penrith Panthers | Parramatta Stadium | 15,600 | |
| Sunday, 17 July | 2016 | 19 | Penrith Panthers | 22 – 18 | Parramatta Eels | Penrith Stadium | 15,251 | |
| Saturday, 22 April | 2017 | 8 | Parramatta Eels | 18 – 12 | Penrith Panthers | ANZ Stadium | 14,070 | |
| Sunday, 11 March | 2018 | 1 | Parramatta Eels | 14 – 24 | Penrith Panthers | BlueBet Stadium | 21,506 | |
| Sunday, 8 April | 2018 | 5 | Parramatta Eels | 6 – 12 | Penrith Panthers | Stadium Australia | 10,061 | |
| Sunday, 17 March | 2019 | 1 | Penrith Panthers | 12 – 20 | Parramatta Eels | BlueBet Stadium | 12,604 | |
| Thursday, 23 May | 2019 | 11 | Parramatta Eels | 10 – 16 | Penrith Panthers | Bankwest Stadium | 16,228 | |
| Friday, 12 June | 2020 | 5 | Parramatta Eels | 16 – 10 | Penrith Panthers | Bankwest Stadium | 507 | |
| Friday, 11 September | 2020 | 18 | Penrith Panthers | 20 – 2 | Parramatta Eels | BlueBet Stadium | 3,955 | |
| Friday, 2 July | 2021 | 16 | Penrith Panthers | 13 – 12 | Parramatta Eels | BlueBet Stadium | 0 | |
| Friday, 3 September | 2021 | 25 | Parramatta Eels | 6 – 40 | Penrith Panthers | Cbus Super Stadium | 8,580 | |
| Friday, 6 May | 2022 | 9 | Penrith Panthers | 20 – 22 | Parramatta Eels | BlueBet Stadium | 21,348 | |
| Friday, 29 July | 2022 | 20 | Parramatta Eels | 34 – 10 | Penrith Panthers | Commbank Stadium | 26,912 | |
| Thursday, 23 March | 2023 | 4 | Parramatta Eels | 17 – 16 | Penrith Panthers | Commbank Stadium | 16,342 | |
| Thursday, 24 August | 2023 | 26 | Penrith Panthers | 18 – 32 | Parramatta Eels | Penrith Stadium | 21,525 | |
| Friday, 15 March | 2024 | 2 | Penrith Panthers | 26 – 18 | Parramatta Eels | Penrith Stadium | 21,522 | |
| Friday, 9 August | 2024 | 23 | Parramatta Eels | 34 – 36 | Penrith Panthers | Commbank Stadium | 18,852 | |
| Sunday, 1 June | 2025 | 13 | Penrith Panthers | 18 – 10 | Parramatta Eels | Commbank Stadium | 21,282 | |
| Sunday, 13 July | 2025 | 19 | Parramatta Eels | 10 – 32 | Penrith Panthers | Commbank Stadium | 22,792 | |
| Saturday, 28 March | 2026 | 4 | Penrith Panthers | 48 – 20 | Parramatta Eels | Commbank Stadium | 22,813 | |

=== Finals series ===
This table only shows competitive finals series matches.

| Date | Round | Home team | Score | Away team | Venue | Attendance | Report |
|---|---|---|---|---|---|---|---|
| 7 September 1985 | QF | Parramatta Eels | 38 – 6 | Penrith Panthers | Sydney Cricket Ground | 18,939 | |
| 12 August 2000 | SF | Parramatta Eels | 28 – 10 | Penrith Panthers | Sydney Football Stadium | 25,746 | |
| 18 September 2021 | SF | Penrith Panthers | 8 – 6 | Parramatta Eels | BB Print Stadium | 6,011 | |
| 9 September 2022 | QF | Penrith Panthers | 27 – 8 | Parramatta Eels | BlueBet Stadium | 21,863 | |
| 2 October 2022 | GF | Penrith Panthers | 28 – 12 | Parramatta Eels | Accor Stadium | 82,415 | |

=== NRL Nines ===
Playing in the NRL Nines does not count as a senior first grade appearance.

| Date | Round | Home team | Score | Away team | Venue | Attendance | Report |
|---|---|---|---|---|---|---|---|
| 5 February 2017 | SF | Penrith Panthers | 13 – 0 | Parramatta Eels | Eden Park | 22,000 | |

== Statistics ==
=== Most appearances ===
| Player | Team | Games |
|---|---|---|
| Bob O'Reilly | Parramatta Eels | 32 |
| Isaah Yeo | Penrith Panthers | 25 |
| Nathan Hindmarsh | Parramatta | 25 |
| Michael Cronin | Parramatta Eels | 25 |
| Raymond Price | Parramatta Eels | 25 |
| Royce Simmons | Penrith Panthers | 23 |
| Mark Levy | Penrith Panthers; Parramatta Eels | 23 |
| Geoff Gerard | Penrith Panthers; Parramatta Eels | 23 |
| Brett Kenny | Parramatta Eels | 22 |
| Peter Sterling | Parramatta Eels | 21 |

=== Top pointscorers ===
| Player | Team | Tries | Goals | FG | Points |
|---|---|---|---|---|---|
| Michael Cronin | Parramatta Eels | 11 | 95 | 0 | 225 |
| Nathan Cleary | Penrith Panthers | 4 | 65 | 3 | 149 |
| Luke Burt | Parramatta Eels | 9 | 55 | 0 | 146 |
| Ryan Girdler | Penrith Panthers | 9 | 32 | 1 | 101 |
| Greg Alexander | Penrith Panthers | 9 | 15 | 0 | 66 |
| Mitchell Moses | Parramatta Eels | 0 | 32 | 1 | 65 |
| Clinton Gutherson | Parramatta Eels | 9 | 14 | 0 | 64 |
| Clinton Schifcofske | Parramatta Eels | 3 | 22 | 0 | 56 |
| Preston Campbell | Penrith Panthers | 2 | 23 | 0 | 54 |
| Michael Gordon | Penrith Panthers | 5 | 16 | 0 | 52 |

=== Top tryscorers ===
| Player | Team | Tries | Games |
|---|---|---|---|
| Brett Kenny | Parramatta Eels | 13 | 22 |
| Rhys Wesser | Penrith Panthers | 12 | 12 |
| Michael Cronin | Parramatta Eels | 11 | 25 |
| Brian To'o | Penrith Panthers | 11 | 15 |
| Steve Ella | Parramatta Eels | 10 | 15 |
| Greg Alexander | Penrith Panthers | 9 | 18 |
| Luke Burt | Parramatta Eels | 9 | 19 |
| Ryan Girdler | Penrith Panthers | 9 | 13 |
| Clinton Gutherson | Parramatta Eels | 9 | 17 |
| David Simmons | Penrith Panthers | 9 | 9 |

=== Attendances ===
- Highest attendance:
  - Parramatta Eels at home: 54,833 – Parramatta 40 – 4 Penrith, Round 1, 2001, ANZ Stadium
  - Penrith Panthers at home: 22,582 – Penrith 28 – 34 Parramatta, Round 19, 2010, Penrith Stadium
- Lowest attendance:
  - Parramatta Eels at home: 507 – Parramatta 16 – 10 Penrith, Round 5, 2020, Bankwest Stadium (Attendances impacted by COVID-19)
  - Penrith Panthers at home: 3,870 – Penrith 24 – 16 Parramatta, Round 22, 1996, Penrith Stadium

== See also ==
- Rivalries in the National Rugby League
