= Sydney Derby =

Sydney Derby may refer to:

- Ron Coote Cup, the inner city Sydney Derby between the Sydney Roosters and South Sydney Rabbitohs in the National Rugby League
- Sydney Derby (A-Leagues), association football (soccer) matches between A-Leagues teams Sydney FC and Western Sydney Wanderers
- Sydney Derby (BBL), cricket derby matches between Big Bash League teams Sydney Sixers and Sydney Thunder
- Sydney Derby (AFL), Australian rules football matches between the Sydney Swans and Greater Western Sydney Giants in the Australian Football League
- Sydney Derby (AIHL), Ice hockey matches between the Sydney Bears and Sydney Ice Dogs in the Australian Ice Hockey League

== See also ==
- Australian Derby, a Group 1 horse race which takes place in Sydney
- Western Sydney Derby
