= 2012 NRL season results =

Australia/New Zealand rugby league results

The 2012 NRL season consisted of 26 weekly regular season rounds starting on 1 March, followed by four weeks of play-offs that culminated in the grand final on 30 September. The finals format for 2012 was also changed, with the new ARL Commission dispensing with the McIntyre final eight system and replacing it with the finals system employed previously by the ARL in the 1990s.

== Regular season ==
=== Round 1 ===
| Home | Score | Away | Match Information |
| Home | Score | Away | Date and Time (Local) | Venue | Referees | Attendance |
|---|---|---|---|---|---|---|
| Newcastle Knights | 14 – 15 | St. George Illawarra Dragons | 1 March 2012, 7:30pm | Hunter Stadium | Matt Cecchin; Ashley Klein | 29,189 |
| Parramatta Eels | 6 – 18 | Brisbane Broncos | 2 March 2012, 7:30pm | Parramatta Stadium | Shayne Hayne; Gavin Morris | 11,399 |
| Canberra Raiders | 19 – 24 | Melbourne Storm | 3 March 2012, 5:30pm | Canberra Stadium | Gavin Badger; Brett Suttor | 7,862 |
| Penrith Panthers | 14 – 22 | Canterbury-Bankstown Bulldogs | 3 March 2012, 7:30pm | Centrebet Stadium | Jason Robinson; Phil Haines | 9,585 |
| North Queensland Cowboys | 0 – 18 | Gold Coast Titans | 3 March 2012, 8:30pm | Dairy Farmers Stadium | Steve Lyons; Alan Shortall | 16,311 |
| New Zealand Warriors | 20 – 26 | Manly-Warringah Sea Eagles | 4 March 2012, 2:00pm | Eden Park | Tony Archer; Ben Cummins | 37,502 |
| Wests Tigers | 17 – 16 | Cronulla-Sutherland Sharks | 4 March 2012, 2:00pm | Leichhardt Oval | Jarred Maxwell; Chris James | 19,762 |
| South Sydney Rabbitohs | 20 – 24 | Sydney Roosters | 5 March 2012, 7:00pm | ANZ Stadium | Gerard Sutton; Adam Devcich | 18,278 |

Source: NRL 2012 Round 1 – RL Project

- After five previous unsuccessful attempts, the St George Illawarra Dragons became the last club to win a match in golden point extra time.
- The North Queensland Cowboys were held scoreless for the first time since 2006, and at home since 2003.
- This round saw the NRL premiership coaching debuts of the Dragons' Steve Price, the Sea Eagles' Geoff Toovey, the Warriors' Brian McClennan and the Rabbitohs' Michael Maguire.
- 2012's Round 1 set a new record in television ratings for an opening round, up 9% on the previous season's.
- This Round was the 9th (and as of Round 15 2014, last) time since Golden Point's inception in 2003 that there were 2 Golden Point games in the same week.

=== Round 2 ===
| Home | Score | Away | Match Information |
| Home | Score | Away | Date and Time (Local) | Venue | Referees | Attendance |
|---|---|---|---|---|---|---|
| Manly-Warringah Sea Eagles | 22 – 18 | Wests Tigers | 9 March 2012, 7:30pm | Bluetongue Stadium | Ben Cummins; Gerard Sutton | 17,532 |
| Brisbane Broncos | 26 – 28 | North Queensland Cowboys | 9 March 2012, 7:30pm | Suncorp Stadium | Jason Robinson; Gavin Reynolds | 43,171 |
| Gold Coast Titans | 12 – 24 | Canberra Raiders | 10 March 2012, 4:30pm | Skilled Park | Steve Lyons; Alan Shortall | 11,378 |
| Canterbury-Bankstown Bulldogs | 30 – 4 | St. George Illawarra Dragons | 10 March 2012, 7:30pm | ANZ Stadium | Matt Cecchin; Ashley Klein | 29,641 |
| Cronulla-Sutherland Sharks | 6 – 18 | Newcastle Knights | 11 March 2012, 2:00pm | Toyota Stadium | Tony Archer; Phil Haines | 15,564 |
| Sydney Roosters | 0 – 18 | Penrith Panthers | 11 March 2012, 3:00pm | Allianz Stadium | Adam Devcich; Chris James | 12,746 |
| Melbourne Storm | 24 – 10 | South Sydney Rabbitohs | 11 March 2012, 7:00pm | AAMI Park | Shayne Hayne; Gavin Morris | 15,872 |
| Parramatta Eels | 20 – 36 | New Zealand Warriors | 12 March 2012, 7:00pm | Parramatta Stadium | Gavin Badger; Brett Suttor | 12,102 |

Source: NRL 2012 Round 2 – RL Project

- The Gold Coast lost at home to Canberra for the first time.
- Canterbury defeated St. George Illawarra for the first time since Round 6, 2008.
- Penrith prevented their opposition scoring a try for the first time since Round 17, 2003, breaking an alltime record streak of 208 games
- The Round 2 attendance total of 158,006 set a new record for Round 2, exceeding the previous high of 148,127 in 2009.
- The Round 2 attendance total exceeded the Round 1 total for the first time since 1996.

=== Round 3 ===
| Home | Score | Away | Match Information |
| Home | Score | Away | Date and Time (Local) | Venue | Referees | Attendance |
|---|---|---|---|---|---|---|
| St. George Illawarra Dragons | 36 – 12 | Wests Tigers | 16 March 2012, 7:30pm | WIN Jubilee Oval | Tony Archer; Phil Haines | 18,726 |
| Newcastle Knights | 10 – 24 | Brisbane Broncos | 16 March 2012, 8:30pm | Hunter Stadium | Shayne Hayne; Gavin Morris | 23,894 |
| Gold Coast Titans | 6 – 30 | Melbourne Storm | 17 March 2012, 4:30pm | Skilled Park | Jason Robinson; Gavin Reynolds | 11,254 |
| North Queensland Cowboys | 42 – 6 | Parramatta Eels | 17 March 2012, 6:30pm | Dairy Farmers Stadium | Adam Devcich; Chris James | 8,239 |
| New Zealand Warriors | 18 – 32 | Canterbury-Bankstown Bulldogs | 18 March 2012, 2:00pm | Mt Smart Stadium | Matt Cecchin; Ashley Klein | 17,067 |
| Sydney Roosters | 14 – 8 | Canberra Raiders | 18 March 2012, 2:00pm | Allianz Stadium | Steve Lyons; Alan Shortall | 10,343 |
| Penrith Panthers | 24 – 40 | South Sydney Rabbitohs | 18 March 2012, 3:00pm | Centrebet Stadium | Gavin Badger; Bernard Sutton | 13,876 |
| Cronulla-Sutherland Sharks | 17 – 14 | Manly-Warringah Sea Eagles | 19 March 2012, 7:00pm | Toyota Stadium | Ben Cummins; Chris Sutton | 8,652 |

Source: NRL 2012 Round 3 – RL Project

=== Round 4 ===
| Home | Score | Away | Match Information |
| Home | Score | Away | Date and Time (Local) | Venue | Referees | Attendance |
|---|---|---|---|---|---|---|
| Parramatta Eels | 6 – 39 | Penrith Panthers | 23 March 2012, 7:30pm | Parramatta Stadium | Matt Cecchin; Gavin Reynolds | 13,788 |
| South Sydney Rabbitohs | 12 – 20 | Brisbane Broncos | 23 March 2012, 6:00pm | nib Stadium | Ashley Klein; Chris James | 15,599 |
| New Zealand Warriors | 26 – 6 | Gold Coast Titans | 24 March 2012, 7:30pm | Mt Smart Stadium | Jarred Maxwell; Gavin Morris | 12,915 |
| St. George Illawarra Dragons | 17 – 6 | Manly-Warringah Sea Eagles | 24 March 2012, 7:30pm | WIN Jubilee Oval | Shayne Hayne; Adam Devcich | 17,893 |
| North Queensland Cowboys | 14 – 20 | Cronulla-Sutherland Sharks | 24 March 2012, 8:30pm | Dairy Farmers Stadium | Gerard Sutton; Tony De Las Heras | 11,364 |
| Melbourne Storm | 44 – 4 | Sydney Roosters | 25 March 2012, 2:00pm | AAMI Park | Tony Archer; Gavin Badger | 11,897 |
| Canterbury-Bankstown Bulldogs | 6 – 20 | Newcastle Knights | 25 March 2012, 3:00pm | ANZ Stadium | Ben Cummins; Phil Haines | 21,701 |
| Wests Tigers | 16 – 30 | Canberra Raiders | 26 March 2012, 7:00pm | Campbelltown Sports Stadium | Jason Robinson; Brett Suttor | 14,388 |

Source: NRL 2012 Round 4 – RL Project

- Parramatta's four losses to begin a season is the first time it has done so since 1991.
- Canberra defeated the Wests Tigers for the first time since Round 5, 2008, and at Campbelltown for the first time since Round 23, 2006.

=== Round 5 - Heritage Round ===
| Home | Score | Away | Match Information |
| Home | Score | Away | Date and Time (Local) | Venue | Referees | Attendance |
|---|---|---|---|---|---|---|
| Melbourne Storm | 34 – 22 | Newcastle Knights | 30 March 2012, 7:30pm | AAMI Park | Matt Cecchin; Adam Devcich | 11,369 |
| Brisbane Broncos | 28 – 20 | St. George Illawarra Dragons | 30 March 2012, 7:30pm | Suncorp Stadium | Ben Cummins; Brett Suttor | 38,012 |
| Penrith Panthers | 14 – 15 | Cronulla-Sutherland Sharks | 31 March 2012, 5:30pm | Centrebet Stadium | Ashley Klein; Henry Perenara | 13,920 |
| Parramatta Eels | 29 – 20 | Manly-Warringah Sea Eagles | 31 March 2012, 7:30pm | Parramatta Stadium | Grant Maxwell; Gavin Reynolds | 13,158 |
| Sydney Roosters | 26 – 8 | New Zealand Warriors | 31 March 2012, 7:30pm | Allianz Stadium | Tony Archer; Tony De Las Heras | 13,201 |
| Gold Coast Titans | 20 – 30 | Canterbury-Bankstown Bulldogs | 1 April 2012, 2:00pm | Skilled Park | Gerard Sutton; Gavin Badger | 14,344 |
| Wests Tigers | 16 – 17 | South Sydney Rabbitohs | 1 April 2012, 3:00pm | Allianz Stadium | Shayne Hayne; Gavin Morris | 25,608 |
| Canberra Raiders | 6 – 22 | North Queensland Cowboys | 2 April 2012, 7:00pm | Canberra Stadium | Steve Lyons; Chris James | 12,135 |

Source: NRL 2012 Round 5 – RL Project

=== Round 6 ===
| Home | Score | Away | Match Information |
| Home | Score | Away | Date and Time (Local) | Venue | Referees | Attendance |
|---|---|---|---|---|---|---|
| South Sydney Rabbitohs | 20 – 10 | Canterbury-Bankstown Bulldogs | 6 April 2012, 4:00pm | ANZ Stadium | Ben Cummins; Gavin Badger | 35,221 |
| Wests Tigers | 14 – 18 | Brisbane Broncos | 6 April 2012, 7:35pm | Allianz Stadium | Ashley Klein; Steve Lyons | 17,556 |
| Gold Coast Titans | 12 – 18 | Sydney Roosters | 7 April 2012, 5:30pm | Skilled Park | Brett Suttor; Chris James | 11,478 |
| Cronulla-Sutherland Sharks | 12 – 0 | St. George Illawarra Dragons | 7 April 2012, 7:30pm | Toyota Stadium | Matt Cecchin; Adam Devcich | 21,380 |
| Canberra Raiders | 32 – 12 | New Zealand Warriors | 8 April 2012, 2:00pm | Canberra Stadium | Shayne Hayne; Alan Shortall | 10,800 |
| Newcastle Knights | 14 – 6 | Parramatta Eels | 8 April 2012, 3:00pm | Hunter Stadium | Tony Archer; Tony De Las Heras | 24,158 |
| North Queensland Cowboys | 18 – 42 | Melbourne Storm | 8 April 2012, 7:00pm | Dairy Farmers Stadium | Jared Maxwell; Gavin Reynolds | 20,206 |
| Manly-Warringah Sea Eagles | 30 – 0 | Penrith Panthers | 9 April 2012, 7:00pm | Brookvale Oval | Gerard Sutton; Henry Perenara | 14,255 |

Source: NRL 2012 Round 6 – RL Project

- The Round 6 attendance total of 155,054 set a new record for Round 6, exceeding the previous high of 152,371 in 1995 (10 games).

=== Round 7 ===
| Home | Score | Away | Match Information |
| Home | Score | Away | Date and Time (Local) | Venue | Referees | Attendance |
|---|---|---|---|---|---|---|
| St. George Illawarra Dragons | 12 – 4 | Newcastle Knights | 13 April 2012, 7:35pm | WIN Jubilee Oval | Jarred Maxwell; Gavin Reynolds | 15,291 |
| Brisbane Broncos | 30 – 6 | Canberra Raiders | 13 April 2012, 7:35pm | Suncorp Stadium | Ben Cummins; Gavin Badger | 30,017 |
| Melbourne Storm | 12 – 6 | Canterbury-Bankstown Bulldogs | 14 April 2012, 5:30pm | AAMI Park | Matt Cecchin; Adam Devcich | 14,912 |
| Sydney Roosters | 12 – 50 | North Queensland Cowboys | 14 April 2012, 7:00pm | TIO Stadium | Ashley Klein; Gavin Morris | 10,758 |
| Manly-Warringah Sea Eagles | 14 – 26 | Gold Coast Titans | 14 April 2012, 7:30pm | Brookvale Oval | Jason Robinson; Tony De Las Heras | 11,619 |
| New Zealand Warriors | 44 – 22 | South Sydney Rabbitohs | 15 April 2012, 2:00pm | Mt Smart Stadium | Shayne Hayne; Alan Shortall | 15,378 |
| Cronulla-Sutherland Sharks | 24 – 18 | Parramatta Eels | 15 April 2012, 2:00pm | Toyota Stadium | Steve Lyons; Henry Perenara | 14,327 |
| Penrith Panthers | 0 – 30 | Wests Tigers | 15 April 2012, 3:00pm | Centrebet Stadium | Tony Archer; Chris James | 15,759 |

Source: NRL 2012 Round 7 – RL Project

- For the first time since Round 26, 2005, St. George Illawarra defeated Newcastle on any of its home grounds.
- For the first time since Round 13 2005, the Cowboys scored 50 or more points against an opponent.
- For the first time in the Panthers history and the 10th time in NRL history, they were held to nil in 2 consecutive games, becoming the first team since West Tigers in Rounds 15 & 16 2004 to do this, it was also the first time the West Tigers held a team to nil in the joint venture's history, and the first time since Round 18 1998 either team in the merger held a team to nil.

=== Round 8 ===
| Home | Score | Away | Match Information |
| Home | Score | Away | Date and Time (Local) | Venue | Referees | Attendance |
|---|---|---|---|---|---|---|
| St. George Illawarra Dragons | 28 – 24 | Sydney Roosters | 25 April 2012, 4:00pm | Allianz Stadium | Matt Cecchin; Ben Cummins | 40,164 |
| Melbourne Storm | 32 – 14 | New Zealand Warriors | 25 April 2012, 7:00pm | AAMI Park | Tony Archer; Chris James | 20,333 |
| Brisbane Broncos | 26 – 6 | Gold Coast Titans | 27 April 2012, 7:35pm | Suncorp Stadium | Jarred Maxwell; Adam Devcich | 30,083 |
| Canterbury Bankstown Bulldogs | 10 – 12 | Manly Warringah Sea Eagles | 27 April 2012, 7:35pm | ANZ Stadium | Shayne Hayne; Brett Suttor | 24,743 |
| South Sydney Rabbitohs | 20 – 16 | North Queensland Cowboys | 28 April 2012, 7:30pm | ANZ Stadium | Steve Lyons; Henry Perenara | 12,213 |
| Canberra Raiders | 22 – 44 | Cronulla Sutherland Sharks | 29 April 2012, 2:00pm | Canberra Stadium | Jason Robinson; Tony De Las Heras | 12,227 |
| Parramatta Eels | 30 – 31 | Wests Tigers | 29 April 2012, 3:00pm | Parramatta Stadium | Ashley Klein; Gavin Morris | 19,654 |
| Newcastle Knights | 34 – 14 | Penrith Panthers | 30 April 2012, 7:00pm | Hunter Stadium | Gerard Sutton; Gavin Badger | 16,892 |

Source: NRL 2012 Round 8 – RL Project

- The Melbourne Storm became the first team since the Sydney Roosters in 1996 to open a season with eight successive wins.
- The South Sydney Rabbitohs won their 1,000th ever premiership match.
- Parramatta scored 30 points in 13 minutes, as they fell short of what would have been the greatest ever comeback in NRL history.

=== Round 9 ===
| Home | Score | Away | Match Information |
| Home | Score | Away | Date and Time (Local) | Venue | Referees | Attendance |
|---|---|---|---|---|---|---|
| Parramatta Eels | 12 – 46 | Canterbury-Bankstown Bulldogs | 4 May 2012, 7:35pm | ANZ Stadium | Ashley Klein; Brett Suttor | 28,214 |
| North Queensland Cowboys | 30 – 6 | St. George Illawarra Dragons | 4 May 2012, 7:35pm | Dairy Farmers Stadium | Tony Archer; Gavin Badger | 15,006 |
| New Zealand Warriors | 30 – 20 | Brisbane Broncos | 5 May 2012, 7:30pm | Mt Smart Stadium | Ben Cummins; Jason Robinson | 19,012 |
| Gold Coast Titans | 14 – 15 | Wests Tigers | 5 May 2012, 7:30pm | Skilled Park | Gerard Sutton; Alan Shortall | 14,254 |
| Penrith Panthers | 10 – 44 | Melbourne Storm | 5 May 2012, 7:30pm | Centrebet Stadium | Steve Lyons; Henry Perenara | 9,517 |
| Manly-Warringah Sea Eagles | 18 – 12 | Canberra Raiders | 6 May 2012, 2:00pm | Brookvale Oval | Jarred Maxwell; Tony De Las Heras | 15,033 |
| Sydney Roosters | 24 – 6 | Newcastle Knights | 6 May 2012, 3:00pm | Allianz Stadium | Shayne Hayne; Gavin Morris | 12,728 |
| South Sydney Rabbitohs | 34 – 28 | Cronulla-Sutherland Sharks | 7 May 2012, 7:00pm | ANZ Stadium | Matt Cecchin; Chris James | 13,281 |

Source: NRL 2012 Round 9 – RL Project

- Parramatta recorded its worst start to a season since 1960.
- Matt Prior became the first player to be sent off this season for his elbow hit to Cowboys captain Johnathan Thurston.

=== Round 10 ===
| Home | Score | Away | Match Information |
| Home | Score | Away | Date and Time (Local) | Venue | Referees | Attendance |
|---|---|---|---|---|---|---|
| Brisbane Broncos | 22 – 24 | Manly-Warringah Sea Eagles | 11 May 2012, 7:00pm | Suncorp Stadium | Tony Archer; Shayne Hayne | 41,273 |
| Canterbury-Bankstown Bulldogs | 14 – 25 | Gold Coast Titans | 11 May 2012, 8:30pm | Suncorp Stadium | Jarred Maxwell; Brett Suttor | 41,273 |
| New Zealand Warriors | 30 – 26 | Sydney Roosters | 12 May 2012, 7:30pm | Mt Smart Stadium | Steve Lyons; Henry Perenara | 16,220 |
| Newcastle Knights | 12 – 32 | North Queensland Cowboys | 12 May 2012, 7:30pm | Hunter Stadium | Matt Cecchin; Gavin Morris | 18,191 |
| Canberra Raiders | 40 – 34 | Parramatta Eels | 13 May 2012, 2:00pm | Canberra Stadium | Gavin Badger; Adam Devcich | 9,210 |
| Cronulla-Sutherland Sharks | 10- 12 | Melbourne Storm | 13 May 2012, 3:00pm | Toyota Stadium | Ben Cummins; Jason Robinson | 14,595 |
| Penrith Panthers | 13 – 12 | St. George Illawarra Dragons | 14 May 2012, 7:00pm | Centrebet Stadium | Gerard Sutton; Tony De Las Heras | 10,367 |
Bye: South Sydney Rabbitohs & Wests Tigers

Source: NRL 2012 Round 10 – RL Project

=== Round 11 ===
Players selected for Game I of the 2012 State of Origin series were not available for this round.

| Home | Score | Away | Match Information |
| Home | Score | Away | Date and Time (Local) | Venue | Referees | Attendance |
|---|---|---|---|---|---|---|
| Wests Tigers | 24 – 22 | New Zealand Warriors | 18 May 2012, 7:45pm | Leichhardt Oval | Tony Archer; Jason Robinson | 16,406 |
| North Queensland Cowboys | 30 – 28 | Penrith Panthers | 19 May 2012, 7:30pm | Dairy Farmers Stadium | Steve Lyons; Chris James | 11,648 |
| Manly-Warringah Sea Eagles | 18 – 10 | Sydney Roosters | 20 May 2012, 2:00pm | Brookvale Oval | Ashley Klein; Jarred Maxwell | 12,633 |
| St. George Illawarra Dragons | 18 – 19 | South Sydney Rabbitohs | 20 May 2012, 3:00pm | WIN Jubilee Oval | Shayne Hayne; Brett Suttor | 14,894 |
| Canterbury-Bankstown Bulldogs | 26 – 6 | Cronulla-Sutherland Sharks | 21 May 2012, 7:00pm | ANZ Stadium | Gerard Sutton; Gavin Badger | 12,012 |
Bye: Brisbane Broncos, Canberra Raiders, Gold Coast Titans, Melbourne Storm, Newcastle Knights & Parramatta Eels

Source: NRL 2012 Round 11 – RL Project

- The Dragons became the 5th team to play Golden Point in consecutive weeks.

=== Round 12 ===
| Home | Score | Away | Match Information |
| Home | Score | Away | Date and Time (Local) | Venue | Referees | Attendance |
|---|---|---|---|---|---|---|
| Melbourne Storm | 34 – 10 | Brisbane Broncos | 25 May 2012, 7:35pm | AAMI Park | Tony Archer; Gerard Sutton | 10,054 |
| South Sydney Rabbitohs | 36 – 18 | Canberra Raiders | 25 May 2012, 7:35pm | ANZ Stadium | Ashley Klein; Chris James | 13,200 |
| Newcastle Knights | 14 – 24 | Gold Coast Titans | 26 May 2012, 5:30pm | Hunter Stadium | Shayne Hayne; Alan Shortall | 15,792 |
| St. George Illawarra Dragons | 14 – 12 | Parramatta Eels | 26 May 2012, 7:30pm | WIN Jubilee Oval | Jarred Maxwell; Tony De Las Heras | 12,756 |
| Penrith Panthers | 22 – 4 | Manly-Warringah Sea Eagles | 27 May 2012, 2:00pm | Centrebet Stadium | Matt Cecchin; Gavin Reynolds | 11,844 |
| Wests Tigers | 26 – 18 | North Queensland Cowboys | 27 May 2012, 3:00pm | Campbelltown Sports Stadium | Ben Cummins; Brett Suttor | 13,059 |
| Sydney Roosters | 12 – 30 | Canterbury-Bankstown Bulldogs | 28 May 2012, 7:00pm | Allianz Stadium | Adam Devcich; Jason Robinson | 11,343 |
Bye: Cronulla-Sutherland Sharks & New Zealand Warriors

Source: NRL 2012 Round 12 – RL Project

=== Round 13 ===
| Home | Score | Away | Match Information |
| Home | Score | Away | Date and Time (Local) | Venue | Referees | Attendance |
|---|---|---|---|---|---|---|
| Gold Coast Titans | 28 – 12 | North Queensland Cowboys | 1 June 2012, 7:35pm | Skilled Park | Shane Hayne; Alan Shortall | 12,092 |
| Manly-Warringah Sea Eagles | 20 – 8 | St. George Illawarra Dragons | 1 June 2012, 7:35pm | Brookvale Oval | Tony Archer; Chris James | 11,855 |
| Canberra Raiders | 0 – 40 | Wests Tigers | 2 June 2012, 5:30pm | Canberra Stadium | Gavin Badger; Phil Haines | 9,210 |
| Canterbury-Bankstown Bulldogs | 23 – 18 | South Sydney Rabbitohs | 2 June 2012, 7:30pm | ANZ Stadium | Ben Cummins; Gavin Morris | 19,409 |
| Brisbane Broncos | 50 – 24 | Newcastle Knights | 3 June 2012, 3:00pm | Suncorp Stadium | Ashley Klein; Gavin Reynolds | 26,683 |
| New Zealand Warriors | 12 – 22 | Melbourne Storm | 3 June 2012, 4:00pm | Mt Smart Stadium | Matt Cecchin; Adam Devcich | 20,487 |
| Parramatta Eels | 29 – 20 | Cronulla-Sutherland Sharks | 4 June 2012, 7:00pm | Parramatta Stadium | Steve Lyons; Henry Perenara | 10,009 |
Bye: Penrith Panthers & Sydney Roosters

Source: NRL 2012 Round 13 – RL Project

=== Round 14 ===
| Home | Score | Away | Match Information |
| Home | Score | Away | Date and Time (Local) | Venue | Referees | Attendance |
|---|---|---|---|---|---|---|
| Melbourne Storm | 6 – 10 | Wests Tigers | 8 June 2012, 7:45pm | AAMI Park | Shane Hayne; Gerard Sutton | 11,274 |
| Newcastle Knights | 16 – 32 | Canberra Raiders | 9 June 2012, 7:30pm | Hunter Stadium | Ashley Klein; Jared Maxwell | 15,114 |
| Cronulla-Sutherland Sharks | 22 – 12 | Gold Coast Titans | 10 June 2012, 2:00pm | Toyota Stadium | Gavin Badger; Jason Robinson | 8,635 |
| Sydney Roosters | 22 – 40 | Brisbane Broncos | 10 June 2012, 3:00pm | Allianz Stadium | Adam Devcich; Matt Cecchin | 9,738 |
| Penrith Panthers | 16 – 30 | New Zealand Warriors | 11 June 2012, 5:30pm | Centrebet Stadium | Steve Lyons; Brett Suttor | 5,778 |
Bye: Canterbury-Bankstown Bulldogs, Manly-Warringah Sea Eagles, North Queensland Cowboys, Parramatta Eels, South Sydney Rabbitohs & St. George Illawarra Dragons

Source: NRL 2012 Round 14 – RL Project

=== Round 15 ===
| Home | Score | Away | Match Information |
| Home | Score | Away | Date and Time (Local) | Venue | Referees | Attendance |
|---|---|---|---|---|---|---|
| St. George Illawarra Dragons | 20 – 28 | Canterbury-Bankstown Bulldogs | 15 June 2012, 7:35pm | WIN Stadium | Shane Hayne; Chris James | 16,928 |
| North Queensland Cowboys | 12 – 0 | Brisbane Broncos | 15 June 2012, 7:35pm | Dairy Farmers Stadium | Gavin Morris; Jason Robinson | 20,367 |
| Cronulla-Sutherland Sharks | 20 – 19 | New Zealand Warriors | 16 June 2012, 5:30pm | Toyota Stadium | Ashley Klein; Steve Lyons | 9,271 |
| Parramatta Eels | 6 – 24 | South Sydney Rabbitohs | 16 June 2012, 7:30pm | ANZ Stadium | Alan Shortall; Brett Suttor | 14,212 |
| Gold Coast Titans | 36 – 18 | Penrith Panthers | 17 June 2012, 2:00pm | Skilled Park | Gerard Sutton; Phil Haines | 11,591 |
| Wests Tigers | 28 – 42 | Sydney Roosters | 17 June 2012, 3:00pm | Leichhardt Oval | Gavin Badger; Ben Cummins | 20,327 |
| Manly-Warringah Sea Eagles | 22 – 26 | Melbourne Storm | 18 June 2012, 7:00pm | Brookvale Oval | Tony Archer; Jared Maxwell | 12,106 |
Bye: Canberra Raiders & Newcastle Knights

Source: NRL 2012 Round 15 – RL Project

- For only the second time in the club's history, the Brisbane Broncos were held scoreless in Queensland, it was also the first time the Cowboys have held a team scoreless since the 2005 Preliminary Final.

=== Round 16 - Women in League round ===
| Home | Score | Away | Match Information |
| Home | Score | Away | Date and Time (Local) | Venue | Referees | Attendance |
|---|---|---|---|---|---|---|
| St. George Illawarra Dragons | 8 – 6 | Gold Coast Titans | 22 June 2012, 7:35pm | WIN Stadium | Gavin Morris; Jason Robinson | 10,194 |
| Brisbane Broncos | 26 – 12 | South Sydney Rabbitohs | 22 June 2012, 7:35pm | Suncorp Stadium | Tony Archer; Chris James | 33,602 |
| North Queensland Cowboys | 40 – 18 | Canberra Raiders | 23 June 2012, 5:30pm | Dairy Farmers Stadium | Alan Shortall; Brett Suttor | 14,344 |
| Penrith Panthers | 18 – 19 | Parramatta Eels | 23 June 2012, 7:30pm | Centrebet Stadium | Adam Devcich; Jared Maxwell | 15,275 |
| Canterbury-Bankstown Bulldogs | 20 – 4 | Melbourne Storm | 24 June 2012, 2:00pm | Virgin Australia Stadium | Gavin Badger; Ben Cummins | 11,876 |
| Sydney Roosters | 14 – 52 | Manly-Warringah Sea Eagles | 24 June 2012, 3:00pm | Allianz Stadium | Shayne Hayne; Steve Lyons | 13,531 |
| Newcastle Knights | 38 – 20 | Wests Tigers | 25 June 2012, 7:00pm | Hunter Stadium | Phil Haines; Gerard Sutton | 18,637 |
Bye: Cronulla-Sutherland Sharks & New Zealand Warriors

Source: NRL 2012 Round 16 – RL Project

- Petero Civoniceva (Brisbane) became the 17th player in premiership history to play 300 games.

=== Round 17 ===
| Home | Score | Away | Match Information |
| Home | Score | Away | Date and Time (Local) | Venue | Referees | Attendance |
|---|---|---|---|---|---|---|
| Brisbane Broncos | 12 – 26 | Cronulla-Sutherland Sharks | 29 June 2012, 7:35pm | Suncorp Stadium | Gavin Badger; Jason Robinson | 26,268 |
| Parramatta Eels | 12 – 20 | Newcastle Knights | 30 June 2012, 7:30pm | Parramatta Stadium | Matt Cecchin; Phil Haines | 12,022 |
| South Sydney Rabbitohs | 38 – 12 | Penrith Panthers | 1 July 2012, 3:00pm | ANZ Stadium | Steve Lyons; Gerard Sutton | 13,096 |
| New Zealand Warriors | 35 – 18 | North Queensland Cowboys | 1 July 2012, 4:00pm | Mt Smart Stadium | Ashley Klein; Brett Suttor | 15,374 |
| Canberra Raiders | 22 – 18 | St. George Illawarra Dragons | 2 July 2012, 7:00pm | Canberra Stadium | Adam Devcich; Jared Maxwell | 10,462 |
Bye: Canterbury-Bankstown Bulldogs, Gold Coast Titans, Manly-Warringah Sea Eagles, Melbourne Storm, Sydney Roosters & Wests Tigers

Source: NRL 2012 Round 17 – RL Project

=== Round 18 ===
| Home | Score | Away | Match Information |
| Home | Score | Away | Date and Time (Local) | Venue | Referees | Attendance |
|---|---|---|---|---|---|---|
| Wests Tigers | 20 – 32 | Canterbury-Bankstown Bulldogs | 6 July 2012, 7:45pm | Allianz Stadium | Gavin Morris; Jason Robinson | 19,034 |
| Melbourne Storm | 12 – 40 | Canberra Raiders | 7 July 2012, 5:30pm | AAMI Park | Adam Devcich; Gerard Sutton | 12,214 |
| Gold Coast Titans | 14 – 32 | New Zealand Warriors | 7 July 2012, 7:30pm | Skilled Park | Matt Cecchin; Phil Haines | 17,134 |
| South Sydney Rabbitohs | 34 – 14 | Newcastle Knights | 8 July 2012, 2:00pm | ANZ Stadium | Ashley Klein; Brett Suttor | 16,104 |
| Manly-Warringah Sea Eagles | 40 – 24 | Parramatta Eels | 8 July 2012, 3:00pm | Brookvale Oval | Shayne Hayne; Alan Shortall | 16,065 |
| Cronulla-Sutherland Sharks | 14 – 14 | Sydney Roosters | 9 July 2012, 7:00pm | Toyota Stadium | Chris James; Jared Maxwell | 13,139 |
Bye: Brisbane Broncos, North Queensland Cowboys, Penrith Panthers & St. George Illawarra Dragons

=== Round 19 - Rivalry Round #1 ===
| Home | Score | Away | Match Information |
| Home | Score | Away | Date and Time (Local) | Venue | Referees | Attendance |
|---|---|---|---|---|---|---|
| Brisbane Broncos | 10 – 8 | New Zealand Warriors | 13 July 2012, 7:35pm | Suncorp Stadium | Ben Cummins; Chris James | 32,148 |
| Canterbury-Bankstown Bulldogs | 32 – 12 | Parramatta Eels | 13 July 2012, 7:35pm | ANZ Stadium | Matt Cecchin; Phil Haines | 31,102 |
| Newcastle Knights | 32 – 6 | Manly-Warringah Sea Eagles | 14 July 2012, 5:30pm | Hunter Stadium | Jason Robinson; Tony De Las Heras | 20,154 |
| Melbourne Storm | 16 – 20 | North Queensland Cowboys | 14 July 2012, 5:30pm | AAMI Park | Tony Archer; Gavin Morris | 10,688 |
| Wests Tigers | 26 – 18 | Penrith Panthers | 14 July 2012, 7:30pm | Campbelltown Sports Stadium | Gavin Badger; Henry Perenara | 12,384 |
| Canberra Raiders | 26 – 38 | Gold Coast Titans | 15 July 2012, 2:00pm | Canberra Stadium | Steve Lyons; Gavin Reynolds | 8,240 |
| St. George Illawarra Dragons | 18 – 10 | Cronulla-Sutherland Sharks | 15 July 2012, 3:00pm | WIN Stadium | Ashley Klein; Adam Devcich | 18,282 |
| Sydney Roosters | 22 – 24 | South Sydney Rabbitohs | 16 July 2012, 7:00pm | Allianz Stadium | Shayne Hayne; Alan Shortall | 19,934 |

=== Round 20 - Rivalry Round #2 ===
| Home | Score | Away | Match Information |
| Home | Score | Away | Date and Time (Local) | Venue | Referees | Attendance |
|---|---|---|---|---|---|---|
| Manly-Warringah Sea Eagles | 12 – 20 | Canterbury-Bankstown Bulldogs | 20 July 2012, 7:35pm | Brookvale Oval | Ben Cummins; Brett Suttor | 16,820 |
| Gold Coast Titans | 14 – 10 | Brisbane Broncos | 20 July 2012, 7:35pm | Skilled Park | Jared Maxwell; Alan Shortall | 20,067 |
| New Zealand Warriors | 19 – 24 | Newcastle Knights | 21 July 2012, 7:30pm | Mt Smart Stadium | Adam Devcich; Gerard Sutton | 15,112 |
| South Sydney Rabbitohs | 36 – 14 | St. George Illawarra Dragons | 21 July 2012, 7:30pm | ANZ Stadium | Tony Archer; Gavin Morris | 21,019 |
| Parramatta Eels | 16 – 10 | Melbourne Storm | 21 July 2012, 7:30pm | Parramatta Stadium | Tony De Las Heras; Steve Lyons | 9,029 |
| Cronulla-Sutherland Sharks | 4 – 36 | Canberra Raiders | 22 July 2012, 2:00pm | Toyota Stadium | Shayne Hayne; Henry Perenara | 12,139 |
| Penrith Panthers | 28 – 16 | Sydney Roosters | 22 July 2012, 3:00pm | Centrebet Stadium | Ashley Klein; Gavin Reynolds | 9,646 |
| North Queensland Cowboys | 29 – 16 | Wests Tigers | 23 July 2012, 7:00pm | Dairy Farmers Stadium | Gavin Badger; Matt Cecchin | 12,357 |

=== Round 21 ===
| Home | Score | Away | Match Information |
| Home | Score | Away | Date and Time (Local) | Venue | Referees | Attendance |
|---|---|---|---|---|---|---|
| St. George Illawarra Dragons | 26 – 18 | Melbourne Storm | 27 July 2012, 7:35pm | WIN Stadium | Ben Cummins; Chris James | 11,477 |
| Sydney Roosters | 16 – 36 | Gold Coast Titans | 27 July 2012, 7:35pm | Allianz Stadium | Phil Haines; Jason Robinson | 8,134 |
| Canterbury-Bankstown Bulldogs | 32 – 18 | North Queensland Cowboys | 28 July 2012, 5:30pm | ANZ Stadium | Shayne Hayne; Gerard Sutton | 15,650 |
| Manly-Warringah Sea Eagles | 24 – 22 | New Zealand Warriors | 28 July 2012, 5:30pm | Patersons Stadium | Henry Perenara; Luke Potter | 20,095 |
| Cronulla-Sutherland Sharks | 20 – 21 | Penrith Panthers | 28 July 2012, 7:30pm | Toyota Stadium | Gavin Badger; Steve Lyons | 7,848 |
| Canberra Raiders | 6 – 36 | Newcastle Knights | 29 July 2012, 2:00pm | Canberra Stadium | Matt Cecchin; Gavin Reynolds | 10,260 |
| South Sydney Rabbitohs | 32 – 6 | Wests Tigers | 29 July 2012, 3:00pm | ANZ Stadium | Tony Archer; Brett Suttor | 29,863 |
| Brisbane Broncos | 22 – 42 | Parramatta Eels | 30 July 2012, 7:00pm | Suncorp Stadium | Tony De Las Heras; Ashley Klein | 22,626 |

- The Warriors became the first team in history to surrender an 18-point lead 2 weeks in a row.

=== Round 22 - Close the Gap Round ===
| Home | Score | Away | Match Information |
| Home | Score | Away | Date and Time (Local) | Venue | Referees | Attendance |
|---|---|---|---|---|---|---|
| Sydney Roosters | 26 – 10 | St. George Illawarra Dragons | 3 August 2012, 7:35pm | Allianz Stadium | Matt Cecchin; Gavin Morris | 12,528 |
| Melbourne Storm | 46 – 6 | Penrith Panthers | 4 August 2012, 3:30pm | AAMI Park | Adam Devcich; Ashley Klein | 9,223 |
| Newcastle Knights | 10 – 26 | Canterbury-Bankstown Bulldogs | 4 August 2012, 5:30pm | Hunter Stadium | Jason Robinson; Brett Suttor | 29,482 |
| North Queensland Cowboys | 6 – 8 | Manly-Warringah Sea Eagles | 4 August 2012, 7:30pm | Dairy Farmers Stadium | Shayne Hayne; Gerard Sutton | 14,401 |
| New Zealand Warriors | 4 – 45 | Cronulla-Sutherland Sharks | 5 August 2012, 2:00pm | Mt Smart Stadium | Tony Archer; Alan Shortall | 13,812 |
| Canberra Raiders | 28 – 12 | Brisbane Broncos | 5 August 2012, 2:00pm | Canberra Stadium | Gavin Badger; Chris James | 9,850 |
| Gold Coast Titans | 18 – 22 | South Sydney Rabbitohs | 5 August 2012, 3:00pm | Skilled Park | Ben Cummins; Phil Haines | 20,187 |
| Wests Tigers | 51 – 26 | Parramatta Eels | 6 August 2012, 7:00pm | Campbelltown Sports Stadium | Tony De Las Heras; Jared Maxwell | 14,822 |

- The Sharks win over the Warriors was the biggest winning margin in the entire 2012 NRL Season.

=== Round 23 ===
| Home | Score | Away | Match Information |
| Home | Score | Away | Date and Time (Local) | Venue | Referees | Attendance |
|---|---|---|---|---|---|---|
| South Sydney Rabbitohs | 6 – 23 | Manly-Warringah Sea Eagles | 10 August 2012, 7:35pm | Bluetongue Stadium | Ben Cummins; Phil Haines | 17,947 |
| Melbourne Storm | 24 – 16 | Gold Coast Titans | 10 August 2012, 7:35pm | AAMI Park | Shayne Hayne; Alan Shortall | 9,108 |
| Parramatta Eels | 36 – 22 | Sydney Roosters | 11 August 2012, 5:30pm | Parramatta Stadium | Jared Maxwell; David Munro | 12,193 |
| Wests Tigers | 22 – 12 | St. George Illawarra Dragons | 11 August 2012, 7:30pm | Allianz Stadium | Adam Devcich; Gerard Sutton | 10,546 |
| North Queensland Cowboys | 52 – 12 | New Zealand Warriors | 11 August 2012, 7:30pm | Dairy Farmers Stadium | Chris James; Ashley Klein | 13,616 |
| Penrith Panthers | 10 – 20 | Canberra Raiders | 12 August 2012, 2:00pm | Centrebet Stadium | Jason Robinson; Brett Suttor | 7,437 |
| Canterbury-Bankstown Bulldogs | 22 – 14 | Brisbane Broncos | 12 August 2012, 3:00pm | ANZ Stadium | Tony Archer; Gavin Badger | 19,870 |
| Newcastle Knights | 26 – 4 | Cronulla-Sutherland Sharks | 13 August 2012, 7:00pm | Hunter Stadium | Matt Cecchin; Gavin Morris | 15,394 |

Source: NRL 2012 Round 23 – RL Project

=== Round 24 ===
| Home | Score | Away | Match Information |
| Home | Score | Away | Date and Time (Local) | Venue | Referees | Attendance |
|---|---|---|---|---|---|---|
| Brisbane Broncos | 18 – 19 | Melbourne Storm | 17 August 2012, 7:35pm | Suncorp Stadium | Matt Cecchin; Chris James | 41,467 |
| Canterbury-Bankstown Bulldogs | 23 – 22 | Wests Tigers | 17 August 2012, 7:35pm | ANZ Stadium | Ben Cummins; Jarred Maxwell | 29,194 |
| Canberra Raiders | 24 – 20 | Sydney Roosters | 18 August 2012, 5:30pm | Canberra Stadium | Shayne Hayne; Alan Shortall | 8,860 |
| Cronulla-Sutherland Sharks | 20 – 7 | South Sydney Rabbitohs | 18 August 2012, 7:30pm | Toyota Stadium | Tony Archer; Brett Suttor | 16,463 |
| New Zealand Warriors | 16 – 18 | Penrith Panthers | 19 August 2012, 2:00pm | Mt Smart Stadium | Gavin Badger; David Munro | 11,014 |
| Gold Coast Titans | 24 – 16 | Parramatta Eels | 19 August 2012, 2:00pm | Skilled Park | Gerard Sutton; Steve Lyons | 14,159 |
| Manly-Warringah Sea Eagles | 42 – 20 | Newcastle Knights | 19 August 2012, 3:00pm | Brookvale Oval | Jason Robinson; Phil Haines | 14,191 |
| St. George Illawarra Dragons | 22 – 32 | North Queensland Cowboys | 20 August 2012, 7:00pm | WIN Stadium | Adam Devcich; Ashley Klein | 9,245 |

- This Round Dragons and Knights both had their finals hopes killed off this week against the Cowboys and Sea Eagles respectively.
- The Tigers played their 4th Golden point game in the season, becoming just the 3rd team to do so.

=== Round 25 ===
| Home | Score | Away | Match Information |
| Home | Score | Away | Date and Time (Local) | Venue | Referees | Attendance |
|---|---|---|---|---|---|---|
| Manly-Warringah Sea Eagles | 16 – 6 | Brisbane Broncos | 24 August 2012, 7:35pm | Brookvale Oval | Tony Archer; Jason Robinson | 12,886 |
| Canberra Raiders | 34 – 6 | Canterbury-Bankstown Bulldogs | 24 August 2012, 7:35pm | Canberra Stadium | Matt Cecchin; Chris James | 13,158 |
| Penrith Panthers | 36 – 22 | Gold Coast Titans | 25 August 2012, 3:30pm | Centrebet Stadium | Gavin Badger; Steve Lyons | 7,297 |
| St. George Illawarra Dragons | 38 – 6 | New Zealand Warriors | 25 August 2012, 5:30pm | WIN Stadium | Adam Gee; Jared Maxwell | 11,261 |
| North Queensland Cowboys | 22 – 14 | Newcastle Knights | 25 August 2012, 7:30pm | Dairy Farmers Stadium | Ben Cummins; Brett Suttor | 15,119 |
| Sydney Roosters | 44 – 20 | Wests Tigers | 26 August 2012, 2:00pm | Allianz Stadium | Adam Devcich; Ashley Klein | 15,736 |
| South Sydney Rabbitohs | 38 – 6 | Parramatta Eels | 26 August 2012, 3:00pm | ANZ Stadium | Phil Haines; Gerard Sutton | 24,121 |
| Melbourne Storm | 20 – 18 | Cronulla-Sutherland Sharks | 27 August 2012, 7:00pm | AAMI Park | Shayne Hayne; Alan Shortall | 12,847 |

Source: NRL 2012 Round 25 – RL Project

- Parramatta's loss made it mathematically impossible for them to avoid their first wooden spoon since 1972, after Penrith had beaten the Titans the day before to go 2 wins clear and kill off the Titans finals aspirations in the process.

=== Round 26 ===
| Home | Score | Away | Match Information |
| Home | Score | Away | Date and Time (Local) | Venue | Referees | Attendance |
|---|---|---|---|---|---|---|
| Newcastle Knights | 6 – 18 | South Sydney Rabbitohs | 31 August 2012, 7:35pm | Hunter Stadium | Matt Cecchin; Chris James | 24,127 |
| Brisbane Broncos | 19 – 12 | Penrith Panthers | 31 August 2012, 7:35pm | Suncorp Stadium | Shayne Hayne; Alan Shortall | 35,178 |
| Gold Coast Titans | 16 – 24 | Manly-Warringah Sea Eagles | 1 September 2012, 5:30pm | Skilled Park | Phil Haines; Gerard Sutton | 14,927 |
| Canterbury-Bankstown Bulldogs | 42 – 10 | Sydney Roosters | 1 September 2012, 7:30pm | ANZ Stadium | Gavin Badger; Jared Maxwell | 23,391 |
| Wests Tigers | 6 – 26 | Melbourne Storm | 1 September 2012, 7:30pm | Leichhardt Oval | Tony Archer; Brett Suttor | 10,834 |
| New Zealand Warriors | 22 – 42 | Canberra Raiders | 2 September 2012, 4:00pm | Mt Smart Stadium | Adam Devcich; Jason Robinson | 11,455 |
| Cronulla-Sutherland Sharks | 22 – 36 | North Queensland Cowboys | 2 September 2012, 3:00pm | Toyota Stadium | Ben Cummins; Ashley Klein | 16,829 |
| Parramatta Eels | 8 – 29 | St. George Illawarra Dragons | 2 September 2012, 6:30pm | ANZ Stadium | Grant Atkins; Steve Lyons | 45,863 |

- The final 8 was confirmed after the Tigers-Storm game, which the Tigers lost 26-6, meaning from this point on no other team could make the 8.
- The Bulldogs won their first Minor Premiership since 1994 with their 42-10 win over the Roosters.

== Finals ==
=== Week 1 - Qualifying and Elimination Finals ===
First qualifying final

Friday, 7 September
19:45 AEST (UTC+10)

| Canterbury-Bankstown Bulldogs | 16 – 10 | Manly-Warringah Sea Eagles |
|---|---|---|
| Tries: 3 Wright 8'; Keating 47'; Barba 56'; Goals: 2 Inu 10', 49' (2/3) | 1st: 6–10; 2nd: 10–6; Report | Tries: 2 Taufua 27'; B Stewart 30'; Goals: 1 Cherry-Evans 31' (1/2) |

ANZ Stadium, Sydney
Attendance: 36,420
Referee: Ben Cummins, Ashley Klein

- This was the first Finals meeting between these two clubs since the 1995 Grand Final.

Second qualifying final

Saturday, 8 September
17:45 AEST (UTC+10)

| Melbourne Storm | 24 – 6 | South Sydney Rabbitohs |
|---|---|---|
| Tries: 4 Hoffman 7'; Slater 24'; Fonua 35'; Waqa 46'; Goals: 4 Smith 9', pen 12', 26', 48' (4/5) | 1st: 18–0; 2nd: 6–6; Report | Tries: 1 Pettybourne 72'; Goals: 1 Reynolds 73' |

AAMI Park, Melbourne
Attendance: 19,750
Referee: Shayne Hayne, Jason Robinson

- This was the first Finals game between these two sides.

First elimination final

Saturday, 8 September
19:45 AEST (UTC+10)

| North Queensland Cowboys | 33 – 16 | Brisbane Broncos |
|---|---|---|
| Tries: 5 Morgan 17', 34', 76'; Bowen 5'; Tate 57'; Goals: 6 Thurston 19', pen 28', 35', pen 54', 58', 77' (6/7) | 1st: 18–0; 2nd: 15–16; Report | Tries: 3 Norman 46'; Thaiday 64'; Copley 71'; Goals: 2 Wallace 47', 66' (2/3) |

Dairy Farmers Stadium, Townsville
Attendance: 21,307
Referee: Matt Cecchin, Gerard Sutton

- This was the first Finals game since 2004 between these two sides.

Second elimination final

Sunday, 9 September
16:00 AEST (UTC+10)

| Canberra Raiders | 34 – 16 | Cronulla-Sutherland Sharks |
|---|---|---|
| Tries: 7 Earl 19', 22'; Ferguson 67', 75'; Papalii 36'; Buttriss 70'; Williams 79'; Goals: 3 Croker 23', 38', pen 56' (3/4); Dugan (0/3); Ferguson (0/1) | 1st: 16–6; 2nd: 18–10; Report | Tries: 3 Leutele 6'; Graham 48'; Stapleton 60'; Goals: 2 Carney 7' (1/1); Stapleton 50' (1/2) |

Canberra Stadium, Canberra
Attendance: 24,450
Referee: Tony Archer, Chris James

=== Week 2 - Semi-finals ===
First semi final

Friday, 14 September
19:45 AEST (UTC+10)

| Manly-Warringah Sea Eagles | 22 – 12 | North Queensland Cowboys |
|---|---|---|
| Tries: 4 Oldfield 5', 63'; B Stewart 19'; Taufua 52'; Goals: 3 Lyon pen 18', 21', 64' (3/5) | 1st: 12–6; 2nd: 10–6; Report | Tries: 2 Tamou 30'; Winterstein 45'; Goals: 2 Thurston 32', 47' (2/2) |

Allianz Stadium, Sydney
Attendance: 16,678
Referee: Shayne Hayne, Ben Cummins

Second semi final

Saturday, 15 September
19:45 AEST (UTC+10)

| South Sydney Rabbitohs | 38 – 16 | Canberra Raiders |
|---|---|---|
| Tries: 6 Everingham 23', 68'; Reynolds 8'; S Burgess 37'; Farrell 44'; Inglis pen 64'; Goals: 7 Reynolds 9', pen 19', 25', 39', 45', pen 61', 65' (7/8) | 1st: 20–10; 2nd: 18–6; Report | Tries: 3 Williams 29'; Earl 32'; Ferguson 53'; Goals: 2 Dugan 30', 55' (2/3) |

ANZ Stadium, Sydney
Attendance: 35,874
Referee: Tony Archer, Matt Cecchin

- This was the first final between these two clubs since 1989, and Souths first Finals win since 1987.

=== Week 3 - Preliminary Finals ===
Second preliminary final

Friday, 21 September
19:45 AEST (UTC+10)

| Melbourne Storm | 40 – 12 | Manly-Warringah Sea Eagles |
|---|---|---|
| Tries: 7 Cronk 5', 44'; Slater 9', 66'; Chambers 19'; J Bromwich 60'; Proctor 76'; Goals: 6 Smith 45', pen 51', 62', 67', pen 73' (5/8); Widdop 78' (1/1) | 1st: 12–6; 2nd: 28–6; Report | Tries: 2 Lyon 37', 52'; Goals: 2 Lyon 38', 53' (2/2) |

AAMI Park, Melbourne
Attendance: 25,543
Referee: Tony Archer, Matt Cecchin

First preliminary final

Saturday, 22 September
19:45 AEST (UTC+10)

| Canterbury-Bankstown Bulldogs | 32 – 8 | South Sydney Rabbitohs |
|---|---|---|
| Tries: 6 Perrett 36', 54'; Inu 3'; Wright 40'; Pritchard 58'; Eastwood 80'; Goals: 4 Inu pen 38', 40', 61', 80' (4/7) | 1st: 16–8; 2nd: 16–0; Report | Tries: 1 Luke 8'; Goals: 2 Reynolds 9', pen 22' (2/2) |

ANZ Stadium, Sydney
Attendance: 70,354
Referee: Ben Cummins, Shayne Hayne

- Souths' loss was their 917th in first grade, surpassing the previous record held by Norths
- This was the first time since 1988 these two teams played each other in a Finals match.

=== Week 4 - Grand Final ===
2012 NRL Grand Final

Sunday, 30 September
17:00 AEST (UTC+10)

| Canterbury-Bankstown Bulldogs | 4 – 14 | Melbourne Storm |
|---|---|---|
| Tries: 1 Perrett 25'; Goals: Inu (0/1) | 1st: 4–14; 2nd: 0–0; Report | Tries: 3 Hoffman 7'; Slater 32'; O'Neill 39'; Goals: 1 Smith 32' (1/3) |

ANZ Stadium, Sydney
Attendance: 82,976
Referees: Tony Archer, Ben Cummins
Clive Churchill Medal: Cooper Cronk (Melbourne)

- This was the first Grand Final meeting between these 2 sides.
- It was the Storm's first Grand Final since 2009 which they won 23–16, although the premiership title was stripped the next year after they were found guilty of salary cap cheating, for the Bulldogs it was their first decider since 2004 where they defeated the Roosters 16–13, it was the first time since the 2006 that both Grand Finalists won their last Grand Final.
- Melbourne won their first legal title since 1999.
- For the first time since 2008, the first and second placed teams at the end of the regular season played off in the grand final, and like that decider, the second placed team prevailed over the Minor Premiers.
