= 2004 NRL season results =

Results of National Rugby League matches

This is a list of results for matches of the 2004 National Rugby League season.

== Regular season ==
=== Round 1 ===
Home	Score	Away	Match Information
Home	Score	Away	Date and Time	Venue	Referee	Crowd
Penrith Panthers	14-20	Newcastle Knights	12 March 2004 7:30 pm	Penrith Football Stadium	Tim Mander	19,936
Wests Tigers	12-6	Cronulla Sharks	13 March 2004 5:30 pm	Telstra Stadium	Steve Lyons	42,717
Canterbury Bulldogs	48-14	Parramatta Eels	13 March 2004 7:30 pm	Telstra Stadium	Steve Clark	42,717
North Queensland Cowboys	20-24	Manly Warringah Sea Eagles	13 March 2004 8:30 pm	Dairy Farmers Stadium	Tony Archer	17,952
Brisbane Broncos	28-20	New Zealand Warriors	14 March 2004 2:00 pm	Suncorp Stadium	Sean Hampstead	28,548
St. George Illawarra Dragons	12-21	Canberra Raiders	14 March 2004 2:30 pm	Oki Jubilee Stadium	Paul Simpkins	12,635
Sydney Roosters	22-40	South Sydney Rabbitohs	14 March 2004 6:00 pm	Aussie Stadium	Shayne Hayne	16,516
Melbourne Storm	Bye

=== Round 2 ===
Home	Score	Away	Match Information
Home	Score	Away	Date and Time	Venue	Referee	Crowd
Canberra Raiders	18-34	Penrith Panthers	19 March 2004 7:30 pm	Canberra Stadium	Sean Hampstead	14,327
New Zealand Warriors	10-16	St. George Illawarra Dragons	20 March 2004 7:30 pm	Ericsson Stadium	Tim Mander	16,425
Canterbury Bulldogs	24-20	Cronulla Sharks	20 March 2004 7:30 pm	Sydney Showground	Tony Archer	9,149
Manly Warringah Sea Eagles	20-42	Sydney Roosters	20 March 2004 7:30 pm	Brookvale Oval	Steve Clark	18,674
Melbourne Storm	26-36	Newcastle Knights	21 March 2004 2:30 pm	Olympic Park Stadium	Shayne Hayne	10,068
South Sydney Rabbitohs	17-16	Wests Tigers	21 March 2004 3:00 pm	Aussie Stadium	Steve Lyons	11,293
Brisbane Broncos	18-26	Parramatta Eels	21 March 2004 3:00 pm	Suncorp Stadium	Paul Simpkins	23,550
North Queensland Cowboys	Bye

== Finals series ==
=== Week One ===
==== First Qualifying Final ====
Team	1st Half	2nd Half	Total
(4) Penrith Panthers	24	7	31
(5) St. George Illawarra Dragons	12	18	30

Date	Friday, 19 September 2004 7:30 pm AEST
Tries (Penrith Panthers)	2: T. Waterhouse, P. Campbell; 1: L. Priddis
Tries (St. George Illawarra Dragons)	1: N. Blacklock, B. Hornby, S. Timmins, L. Thompson, D. Young
Goals (Penrith Panthers)	5/5: R Girdler
Goals (St. George Illawarra Dragons)	5/5: M. Head
Field Goals (Penrith Panthers)	1: C. Gower
Field Goals (St. George Illawarra Dragons)	None
Injuries	None
Reports	None
Venue	CUA Stadium, Penrith, NSW
Attendance	21,963
Referee	Sean Hampstead

==== Second Qualifying Final ====
Team	1st Half	2nd Half	Total
(3) Brisbane Broncos	8	6	14
(6) Melbourne Storm	0	31	31

Date	Saturday, 19 September 2004 6:30 pm AEST
Tries (Brisbane Broncos)	1: T. Carroll, B. Tate
Tries (Melbourne Storm)	1: S. Hill, S. Bell, M. King, B. Slater, M. Orford, M. Geyer
Goals (Brisbane Broncos)	3/3: Michael De Vere
Goals (Melbourne Storm)	3/6: Matt Orford
Field Goals (Brisbane Broncos)	None
Field Goals (Melbourne Storm)	1: Matt Orford
Injuries	None
Reports	None
Venue	Suncorp Stadium, Brisbane, QLD
Attendance	31,100
Referee	Stephen Clark

==== Third Qualifying Final ====
Team	1st Half	2nd Half	Total
(2) Canterbury Bulldogs	6	16	22
(7) North Queensland Cowboys	18	12	30

Date	Friday, 19 September 2004 7:30 pm AEST
Tries (Canterbury Bulldogs)	1: S. Williams, M. Utai, B.Harris, W. Tonga
Tries (North Queensland Cowboys)	3: Matt Sing; 1: L.O'Donnell, M.Bowen
Goals (Canterbury Bulldogs)	3/4: H. El Masri
Goals (North Queensland Cowboys)	5/7: J. Hannay
Field Goals (Canterbury Bulldogs)	None
Field Goals (North Queensland Cowboys)	None
Injuries	None
Reports	None
Venue	Telstra Stadium, Sydney, NSW
Attendance	18,371
Referee	Tim mander

==== Fourth Qualifying Final ====
Team	1st Half	2nd Half	Total
(1) Sydney Roosters	14	24	38
(8) Canberra Raiders	0	12	12

Date	Friday, 19 September 2004 7:30 pm AEST
Tries (Sydney Roosters)	2: A. Minichiello; 1: C. Fitzgibbon, J. Hodges, C. Walker, B. Fittler, C. Flannery
Tries (Canberra Raiders)	1: N. Smith, Chalk
Goals (Sydney Roosters)	5/7: C. Fitzgibbon
Goals (Canberra Raiders)	2/2: Schifcofske
Field Goals (Sydney Roosters)	None
Field Goals (Canberra Raiders)	None
Injuries	None
Reports	None
Venue	Aussie Stadium, Sydney, NSW
Attendance	18,325
Referee	Paul Simpkins

=== Week Two ===
==== First Semi Final ====
Team	1st Half	2nd Half	Total
(7) North Queensland Cowboys	8	2	10
(3) Brisbane Broncos	0	0	0

Date	Saturday, 19 September 2004 7 pm AEST
Tries (North Queensland Cowboys)	1: David Myles
Tries (Brisbane Broncos)	None
Goals (North Queensland Cowboys)	3/3: Josh Hannay
Goals (Brisbane Broncos)	None
Field Goals (North Queensland Cowboys)	None
Field Goals (Brisbane Broncos)	None
Injuries	None
Reports	None
Venue	Dairy Farmers Stadium, Townsville, QLD
Attendance	24,989
Referee	Tim Mander

==== Second Semi Final ====
Team	1st Half	2nd Half	Total
(2) Canterbury Bulldogs	18	25	43
(6) Melbourne Storm	6	12	18

Date	Sunday, 20 September 2004 4 pm AEST
Tries (Canterbury Bulldogs)	2: Johnathon Thurston; 1: Willie Tonga, Andrew Ryan, Luke Patten, Adam Perry, Hazem El Masri
Tries (Melbourne Storm)	2: Steven Bell; 1: Billy Slater
Goals (Canterbury Bulldogs)	7/8: Hazem El Masri
Goals (Melbourne Storm)	3/3 Cameron Smith
Field Goals (Canterbury Bulldogs)	1: Brent Sherwin
Field Goals (Melbourne Storm)	None
Injuries	None
Reports	None
Venue	SFS, Sydney, NSW
Attendance	23,750
Referee	Paul Simpkins

=== Week Three ===
==== First Preliminary Final ====
Team	1st Half	2nd Half	Total
(2) Canterbury Bulldogs	4	26	30
(4) Penrith Panthers	8	6	14

Date	Saturday, 25 September 2004 7 pm AEST
Tries (Canterbury Bulldogs)	3: Hazem El Masri; 1: Braith Anasta, Reni Maitua
Tries (Penrith Panthers)	1: Rhys Wesser, Preston Campbell
Goals (Canterbury Bulldogs)	5/8: Hazem El Masri
Goals (Penrith Panthers)	3/3 Ryan Girdler
Field Goals (Canterbury Bulldogs)	None
Field Goals (Penrith Panthers)	None
Injuries	Steve Price (Bulldogs), knee
Reports	None
Venue	SFS, Sydney, NSW
Attendance	37,868
Referee	Tim Mander

==== Second Preliminary Final ====
Team	1st Half	2nd Half	Total
(1) Sydney Roosters	10	9	19
(7) North Queensland Cowboys	6	10	16

Date	Saturday, 26 September 2004 4 pm AEST
Tries (Sydney Roosters)	1: Ryan Cross, Brad Fittler
Tries (North Queensland Cowboys)	2: Ty Williams; 1: Paul Bowman
Goals (Sydney Roosters)	5/5: Craig Fitzgibbon
Goals (North Queensland Cowboys)	2/3: Josh Hannay
Field Goals (Sydney Roosters)	1/1: Brett Finch
Field Goals (North Queensland Cowboys)	None
Injuries	None
Reports	Luke Ricketson (Syd), Careless Punch, 2 Matches
Venue	Telstra Stadium, Sydney, NSW
Attendance	43,048
Referee	Paul Simpkins

== Grand final ==
Team	1st Half	2nd Half	Total
(1) Sydney Roosters	13	0	13
(2) Canterbury Bulldogs	6	10	16

Date	Sunday, 3 October 2004 7 pm AEST
Tries (Sydney Roosters)	1: Anthony Minichiello, Chris Walker
Tries (Canterbury Bulldogs)	2: Matthew Utai, 1: Hazem El Masri
Goals (Sydney Roosters)	2/2: Craig Fitzgibbon
Goals (Canterbury Bulldogs)	2/4: Hazem El Masri
Penalty Goals (Sydney Roosters)	None
Penalty Goals (Canterbury Bulldogs)	1/1: Hazem El Masri
Field Goals (Sydney Roosters)	1/1: Brett Finch
Field Goals (Canterbury Bulldogs)	None
Injuries	None
Reports	None
Churchill Medal	Willie Mason (Canterbury Bulldogs)
Venue	Telstra Stadium, Sydney, New South Wales
Attendance	82,127
Referee	Tim Mander

== See also ==
- National Rugby League season 2004
