= 2015 NRL season results =

2015 National Rugby League
- Teams: 16
- Premiers: North Queensland Cowboys
- Minor premiers: Sydney Roosters (19th title)
- Matches played: 167
- Attendance: 2495633

The 2015 NRL season consisted of 26 weekly regular season rounds starting on Thursday March 5, and concluded on Sunday October 4 with the Grand Final.

== Regular season ==
=== Round 1 ===
Home	Score	Away	Match information
Home	Score	Away	Date and time (Local)	Venue (Broadcaster)	Referees	Attendance
Brisbane Broncos	6 - 36	South Sydney Rabbitohs	5 March 2015, 7:05pm	Suncorp Stadium (Nine Network)	Gerard Sutton; Grant Atkins	36,057
Parramatta Eels	42 - 12	Manly-Warringah Sea Eagles	6 March 2015, 7:45pm	Pirtek Stadium (Nine Network)	Matt Checchin; Henry Perenara	18,718
Newcastle Knights	24 - 14	New Zealand Warriors	7 March 2015, 4:40pm	Hunter Stadium (Fox Sports)		16,146
Gold Coast Titans	18 - 19	Wests Tigers	7 March 2015, 6:00pm	Cbus Super Stadium (Fox Sports)		14,319
North Queensland Cowboys	4 - 28	Sydney Roosters	7 March 2015, 8:00pm	1300SMILES Stadium (Fox Sports)		17,123
Penrith Panthers	24 - 18	Canterbury-Bankstown Bulldogs	8 March 2015, 4:00pm	Pepper Stadium (Nine Network)		18,814
Cronulla-Sutherland Sharks	20 - 24	Canberra Raiders	8 March 2015, 6:30pm	Remondis Stadium (Fox Sports)		11,096
St. George Illawarra Dragons	4 - 12	Melbourne Storm	9 March 2015, 7:00pm	Jubilee Oval (Fox Sports)		10,028

Total Attendance: 142,301 Average Attendance: 17,788

=== Round 2 ===
Home	Score	Away	Match information
Home	Score	Away	Date and time (Local)	Venue (Broadcaster)	Referees	Attendance
Cronulla-Sutherland Sharks	2 - 10	Brisbane Broncos	13 March 2015, 7:35pm	Remondis Stadium (Nine Network)		8,369
Canterbury-Bankstown Bulldogs	32 - 12	Parramatta Eels	13 March 2015, 7:35pm	ANZ Stadium (Nine Network)		28,876
Penrith Panthers	40 - 0	Gold Coast Titans	14 March 2015, 4:30pm	Carrington Park, Bathurst (Fox Sports)		6,240
Manly-Warringah Sea Eagles	24 - 22	Melbourne Storm	14 March 2015, 7:00pm	Brookvale Oval (Fox Sports)		10,531
North Queensland Cowboys	14 - 16	Newcastle Knights	14 March 2015, 8:00pm	1300SMILES Stadium (Fox Sports)		13,006
South Sydney Rabbitohs	34 - 26	Sydney Roosters	15 March 2015, 4:00pm	ANZ Stadium (Nine Network)		27,289
Canberra Raiders	6 - 18	New Zealand Warriors	15 March 2015, 6:30pm	GIO StadiumFox (Fox Sports)		8,241
Wests Tigers	22 - 4	St. George Illawarra Dragons	16 March 2015, 7:00pm	Campbelltown Stadium (Fox Sports)		11,837

Total Attendance:114,389 Average Attendance: 14,299

=== Round 3 ===
Home	Score	Away	Match information
Home	Score	Away	Date and time (Local)	Venue (Broadcaster)	Referees	Attendance
Manly-Warringah Sea Eagles	12 - 16	Canterbury-Bankstown Bulldogs	20 March 2015, 7:35pm	Brookvale Oval (Nine Network)		10,498
Brisbane Broncos	44 - 22	North Queensland Cowboys	20 March 2015, 7:35pm	Suncorp Stadium (Nine Network)		40,047
New Zealand Warriors	29 - 16	Parramatta Eels	21 March 2015, 5:00pm	Mt Smart Stadium (Fox Sports)		14,112
Canberra Raiders	20 - 22	St. George Illawarra Dragons	21 March 2015, 5:30pm	GIO Stadium (Fox Sports)		11,774
Melbourne Storm	36 - 18	Cronulla-Sutherland Sharks	21 March 2015, 7:30pm	AAMI Park (Fox Sports)		13,015
South Sydney Rabbitohs	20 - 6	Wests Tigers	22 March 2015, 4:00pm	ANZ Stadium (Nine Network)		23,211
Gold Coast Titans	18 - 20	Newcastle Knights	22 March 2015, 5:30pm	Cbus Super Stadium (Fox Sports)		6,962
Sydney Roosters	20 - 12	Penrith Panthers	23 March 2015, 7:00pm	Allianz Stadium (Fox Sports)		10,735

Total Attendance: 130,354 Average Attendance: 16,294

=== Round 4 ===
Home	Score	Away	Match information
Home	Score	Away	Date and time (Local)	Venue (Broadcaster)	Referees	Attendance
Parramatta Eels	29 - 16	South Sydney Rabbitohs	27 March 2015, 7:35pm	Pirtek Stadium (Nine Network)		15,562
Wests Tigers	24 - 25xt	Canterbury-Bankstown Bulldogs	27 March 2015, 7:35pm	ANZ Stadium (Nine Network)		20,121
Newcastle Knights	26 - 14	Penrith Panthers	28 March 2015, 3:00pm	Hunter Stadium (Fox Sports)		20,114
Cronulla-Sutherland Sharks	22 - 24	Gold Coast Titans	28 March 2015, 5:30pm	Remondis Stadium (Fox Sports)		9,566
St. George Illawarra Dragons	12 - 4	Manly-Warringah Sea Eagles	28 March 2015, 7:30pm	WIN Stadium (Fox Sports)		12,087
New Zealand Warriors	16 - 24	Brisbane Broncos	29 March 2015, 2:00pm	Mt Smart Stadium (Nine Network)		14,670
Sydney Roosters	34 - 6	Canberra Raiders	29 March 2015, 2:00pm	Allianz Stadium (Fox Sports)		9,582
North Queensland Cowboys	18 - 17xt	Melbourne Storm	30 March 2015, 6:00pm	1300SMILES Stadium (Fox Sports)		11,609

Total Attendance: 113,311 Average Attendance: 14,164

=== Round 5 ===
Home	Score	Away	Match information
Home	Score	Away	Date and time (Local)	Venue (Broadcaster)	Referees	Attendance
Canterbury-Bankstown Bulldogs	17 - 18	South Sydney Rabbitohs	3 April 2015, 4:00pm	ANZ Stadium (Nine Network)		40,523
Gold Coast Titans	16 - 26	Brisbane Broncos	3 April 2015, 7:35pm	Cbus Super Stadium (Nine Network)		15,432
Manly-Warringah Sea Eagles	16 - 29	Canberra Raiders	4 April 2015, 5:30pm	Lavington Sports Ground(Fox Sports)		6,436
Newcastle Knights	0 - 13	St. George Illawarra Dragons	4 April 2015, 7:30pm	Hunter Stadium (Fox Sports)		14,261
Sydney Roosters	12 - 20	Cronulla-Sutherland Sharks	5 April 2015, 4:00pm	Allianz Stadium (Nine Network)		12,004
Parramatta Eels	6 - 22	Wests Tigers	6 April 2015, 3:00pm	ANZ Stadium (Fox Sports)		35,510
Melbourne Storm	30 - 14	New Zealand Warriors	6 April 2015, 5:00pm	AAMI Park (Fox Sports)		18,179
Penrith Panthers	10 - 30	North Queensland Cowboys	6 April 2015, 7:00pm	Pepper Stadium (Fox Sports)		8,409

Total Attendance: 150,754 Average Attendance: 18,844

=== Round 6 ===
Home	Score	Away	Match information
Home	Score	Away	Date and time (Local)	Venue (Broadcaster)	Referees	Attendance
Cronulla-Sutherland Sharks	22 - 6	Newcastle Knights	10 April 2015, 7:35pm	Remondis Stadium (Nine Network)		10,057
Brisbane Broncos	22 - 18 Golden Point	Sydney Roosters	10 April 2015, 7:35pm	Suncorp Stadium (Nine Network)		35,630
Parramatta Eels	16 - 38	Gold Coast Titans	11 April 2015, 3:00pm	Pirtek Stadium (Fox Sports)		11,136
New Zealand Warriors	32-22	Wests Tigers	11 April 2015, 7:30pm	Mt Smart Stadium (Fox Sports)		13,781
Penrith Panthers	22 - 12	Manly-Warringah Sea Eagles	11 April 2015, 7:30pm	Pepper Stadium (Fox Sports)		11,170
Canberra Raiders	10 - 14	Melbourne Storm	12 April 2015, 2:00pm	GIO Stadium (Fox Sports)		10,536
St. George Illawarra Dragons	31 - 6	Canterbury-Bankstown Bulldogs	12 April 2015, 4:00pm	ANZ Stadium (Nine Network)		20,273
South Sydney Rabbitohs	12-30	North Queensland Cowboys	13 April 2015, 7:00pm	ANZ Stadium (Fox Sports)		13,866

Total Attendance:126,449 Average Attendance: 15,806

=== Round 7 ===
Home	Score	Away	Match information
Home	Score	Away	Date and time (Local)	Venue (Broadcaster)	Referees	Attendance
St. George Illawarra Dragons	12 - 6	Brisbane Broncos	17 April 2015, 7:35pm	Jubilee Oval (Nine Network)		13,029
Canterbury-Bankstown Bulldogs	28 - 16	Manly-Warringah Sea Eagles	17 April 2015, 7:35pm	ANZ Stadium (Nine Network)		13,568
Gold Coast Titans	32 - 6	Penrith Panthers	18 April 2015, 3:00pm	Cbus Super Stadium (Fox Sports)		9,224
North Queensland Cowboys	28 - 24	New Zealand Warriors	18 April 2015, 5:30pm	1300SMILES Stadium (Fox Sports)		16,038
Melbourne Storm	17 - 16	Sydney Roosters	18 April 2015, 7:30pm	AAMI Park (Fox Sports)		12,860
Wests Tigers	22 - 30	Canberra Raiders	19 April 2015, 2:00pm	Leichhardt Oval (Fox Sports)		13,198
Newcastle Knights	22 - 28	Parramatta Eels	19 April 2015, 4:00pm	Hunter Stadium (Nine Network)		16,953
Cronulla-Sutherland Sharks	18 - 10	South Sydney Rabbitohs	20 April 2015, 7:00pm	Remondis Stadium (Fox Sports)		3,978

- The Cronulla Sharks vs South Sydney game, played in notorious conditions as a result of an East coast low drew the lowest NRL crowd to a premiership game since 1999.

=== Round 8 ===
Home	Score	Away	Match information
Home	Score	Away	Date and time (Local)	Venue (Broadcaster)	Referees	Attendance
Canterbury-Bankstown Bulldogs	14 - 38	Wests Tigers	24 April 2015, 7:45pm	ANZ Stadium (Nine Network)		18,521
New Zealand Warriors	28 - 32	Gold Coast Titans	25 April 2015, 2:00pm	Mt Smart Stadium (Fox Sports)		15,102
Newcastle Knights	24 - 26	North Queensland Cowboys	25 April 2015, 2:00pm	Hunter Stadium (Fox Sports)		15,518
Sydney Roosters	12 - 14	St. George Illawarra Dragons	25 April 2015, 4:00pm	Allianz Stadium (Nine Network)		35,110
Melbourne Storm	10 - 12	Manly-Warringah Sea Eagles	25 April 2015, 6:00pm	AAMI Park (Fox Sports)		13,948
Brisbane Broncos	28 - 16	Parramatta Eels	25 April 2015, 8:00pm	Suncorp Stadium (Fox Sports)		34,398
Penrith Panthers	26 - 18	Cronulla-Sutherland Sharks	26 April 2015, 2:00pm	Pepper Stadium (Fox Sports)		12,798
South Sydney Rabbitohs	22 - 30	Canberra Raiders	26 April 2015, 4:00pm	Barlow Park (Nine Network)		8,713

Total Attendance:154,108 Average Attendance: 19,264

=== Round 9 ===
Home	Score	Away	Match information
Home	Score	Away	Date and time (Local)	Venue (Broadcaster)	Referees	Attendance
Brisbane Broncos	8 - 5	Penrith Panthers	8 May 2015, 7:35pm	Suncorp Stadium (Nine Network)		24,566
Sydney Roosters	36 - 4	Wests Tigers	8 May 2015, 7:35pm	Allianz Stadium (Nine Network)		14,366
Canberra Raiders	56 - 16	Gold Coast Titans	9 May 2015, 3:00pm	GIO Stadium (Fox Sports)		8116
Cronulla-Sutherland Sharks	16 - 20	New Zealand Warriors	9 May 2015, 5:30pm	Remondis Stadium (Fox Sports)		13,988
North Queensland Cowboys	23 - 16	Canterbury-Bankstown Bulldogs	9 May 2015, 7:30pm	1300SMILES Stadium (Fox Sports)		15,794
Manly-Warringah Sea Eagles	30 - 10	Newcastle Knights	10 May 2015, 2:00pm	Brookvale Oval (Fox Sports)		10,065
Parramatta Eels	10 - 28	Melbourne Storm	10 May 2015, 4:00pm	Pirtek Stadium (Nine Network)		10,505
South Sydney Rabbitohs	16 - 10	St. George Illawarra Dragons	11 May 2015, 7:00pm	ANZ Stadium (Fox Sports)		14,126

Total Attendance: 111,526 Average Attendance: 14,134

=== Round 10 ===
Home	Score	Away	Match information
Home	Score	Away	Date and time (Local)	Venue (Broadcaster)	Referees	Attendance
Canterbury-Bankstown Bulldogs	10-24	Sydney Roosters	15 May 2015, 7:35pm	ANZ Stadium (Nine Network)		17,093
North Queensland Cowboys	31-20	Brisbane Broncos	15 May 2015, 7:35pm	1300SMILES Stadium (Nine Network)		24,531
Parramatta Eels	13 - 17	New Zealand Warriors	16 May 2015, 3:00pm	Pirtek Stadium (Fox Sports)		11,152
Gold Coast Titans	22 - 23	Cronulla-Sutherland Sharks	16 May 2015, 5:30pm	Cbus Super Stadium (Fox Sports)		10,466
Melbourne Storm	16 - 12	South Sydney Rabbitohs	16 May 2015, 7:30pm	AAMI Park (Fox Sports)		18,067
St. George Illawarra Dragons	32 - 18	Canberra Raiders	17 May 2015, 2:00pm	WIN Stadium (Fox Sports)		13,102
Newcastle Knights	22 - 12	Wests Tigers	17 May 2015, 4:00pm	Hunter Stadium (Nine Network)		15,573
Manly-Warringah Sea Eagles	10 - 11	Penrith Panthers	18 May 2015, 7:00pm	Brookvale Oval (Fox Sports)		8,025

=== Round 11 ===
Home	Score	Away	Match information
Home	Score	Away	Date and time (Local)	Venue (Broadcaster)	Referees	Attendance
South Sydney Rabbitohs	14-12	Parramatta Eels	22 May 2015, 7:45pm	ANZ Stadium (Nine Network)		11,658
Wests Tigers	0 - 8	North Queensland Cowboys	23 May 2015, 7:30pm	Campbelltown Stadium (Fox Sports)		8,267
Canberra Raiders	34-41	Canterbury-Bankstown Bulldogs	24 May 2015, 4:00pm	GIO Stadium (Nine Network)		12,221
Newcastle Knights	18 - 31	Brisbane Broncos	25 May 2015, 7:00pm	Hunter Stadium (Fox Sports)		12,673
BYE: Cronulla-Sutherland Sharks; Gold Coast Titans; Manly-Warringah Sea Eagles; Melbourne Storm; New Zealand Warriors; Penrith Panthers; St. George Illawarra Dragons; Sydney Roosters

=== Round 12 ===
Home	Score	Away	Match information
Home	Score	Away	Date and time (Local)	Venue (Broadcaster)	Referees	Attendance
Penrith Panthers	20 - 26	Parramatta Eels	29 May 2015, 7:45pm	Pepper Stadium (Nine Network)		17,821
Gold Coast Titans	16 - 22	South Sydney Rabbitohs	30 May 2015, 3:00pm	Cbus Super Stadium (Fox Sports)		15,583
Canberra Raiders	12 - 24	Brisbane Broncos	30 May 2015, 5:30pm	GIO Stadium (Fox Sports)		10,090
North Queensland Cowboys	18 - 14	Manly-Warringah Sea Eagles	30 May 2015, 7:30pm	1300SMILES Stadium (Fox Sports)		14,196
New Zealand Warriors	24 - 20	Newcastle Knights	31 May 2015, 4:00pm	Mt Smart Stadium (Fox Sports)		13,203
St. George Illawarra Dragons	42 - 6	Cronulla-Sutherland Sharks	31 May 2015, 4:00pm	Jubilee Oval (Nine Network)		18,011
Sydney Roosters	24 - 2	Melbourne Storm	1 June 2015, 7:00pm	Allianz Stadium (Fox Sports)		8,265
BYE: Canterbury-Bankstown Bulldogs; Wests Tigers

=== Round 13 ===
Home	Score	Away	Match information
Home	Score	Away	Date and time (Local)	Venue (Broadcaster)	Referees	Attendance
Brisbane Broncos	44 - 10	Manly-Warringah Sea Eagles	5 June 2015, 7:35pm	Suncorp Stadium (Nine Network)		28,691
Wests Tigers	20 - 27	Gold Coast Titans	5 June 2015, 7:35pm	Leichhardt Oval (Nine Network)		7,103
Newcastle Knights	22 - 44	Canberra Raiders	6 June 2015, 3:00pm	Hunter Stadium (Fox Sports)		13,504
South Sydney Rabbitohs	36 - 4	New Zealand Warriors	6 June 2015, 5:30pm	NIB Stadium (Fox Sports)		20,272
Penrith Panthers	0 - 20	Melbourne Storm	6 June 2015, 7:30pm	Pepper Stadium (Fox Sports)		11,849
Cronulla-Sutherland Sharks	10 - 4	Sydney Roosters	7 June 2015, 4:00pm	Remondis Stadium (Nine Network)		14,235
Canterbury-Bankstown Bulldogs	29 - 16	St. George Illawarra Dragons	8 June 2015, 4:00pm	ANZ Stadium (Nine Network)		27,291
Parramatta Eels	30 - 36	North Queensland Cowboys	8 June 2015, 7:00pm	Pirtek Stadium (Fox Sports)		9,812

=== Round 14 ===
Home	Score	Away	Match information
Home	Score	Away	Date and time (Local)	Venue (Broadcaster)	Referees	Attendance
Wests Tigers	34 - 6	South Sydney Rabbitohs	12 June 2015, 7:45pm	ANZ Stadium (Nine Network)		15,118
New Zealand Warriors	21 - 25	Sydney Roosters	13 June 2015, 8:00pm	Mt Smart Stadium (Fox Sports)		14,167
Gold Coast Titans	28 - 14	Canterbury-Bankstown Bulldogs	14 June 2015, 4:00pm	Cbus Super Stadium (Nine Network)		10,645
Melbourne Storm	22 - 26	Parramatta Eels	15 June 2015, 7:00pm	AAMI Park (Fox Sports)		10,128
BYE: Brisbane Broncos; Canberra Raiders; Cronulla-Sutherland Sharks; Manly-Warringah Sea Eagles; Newcastle Knights; North Queensland Cowboys; Penrith Panthers; St. George Illawarra Dragons

=== Round 15 ===
Home	Score	Away	Match information
Home	Score	Away	Date and time (Local)	Venue (Broadcaster)	Referees	Attendance
Manly-Warringah Sea Eagles	30 - 20	Wests Tigers	19 June 2015, 7:45pm	Brookvale Oval (Nine Network)		8,093
Canberra Raiders	20 - 21	North Queensland Cowboys	20 June 2015, 3:00pm	GIO Stadium (Fox Sports)		10,170
Gold Coast Titans	14 - 36	New Zealand Warriors	20 June 2015, 5:30pm	Cbus Super Stadium (Fox Sports)		14,132
Canterbury-Bankstown Bulldogs	24 - 12	Penrith Panthers	20 June 2015, 7:30pm	ANZ Stadium (Fox Sports)		12,476
Newcastle Knights	28 - 30	Cronulla-Sutherland Sharks	21 June 2015, 2:00pm	Hunter Stadium (Fox Sports)		14,081
Melbourne Storm	12 - 14	Brisbane Broncos	21 June 2015, 4:00pm	AAMI Park (Nine Network)		14,278
St. George Illawarra Dragons	14 - 19	Sydney Roosters	22 June 2015, 7:00pm	Allianz Stadium (Fox Sports)		10,185
BYE: Parramatta Eels; South Sydney Rabbitohs

=== Round 16 ===
Home	Score	Away	Match information
Home	Score	Away	Date and time (Local)	Venue (Broadcaster)	Referees	Attendance
South Sydney Rabbitohs	20 - 8	Manly-Warringah Sea Eagles	26 June 2015, 7:35pm	ANZ Stadium (Nine Network)		14,236
Brisbane Broncos	44 - 22	Newcastle Knights	26 June 2015, 7:35pm	Suncorp Stadium (Nine Network)		27,246
New Zealand Warriors	30 - 8	Canberra Raiders	27 June 2015, 5:00pm	Mt Smart Stadium (Fox Sports)		13,110
North Queensland Cowboys	18-24	Cronulla-Sutherland Sharks	27 June 2015, 5:30pm	1300SMILES Stadium (Fox Sports)		18,826
Parramatta Eels	16-12	St. George Illawarra Dragons	27 June 2015, 7:30pm	Pirtek Stadium (Fox Sports)		15,046
Sydney Roosters	20 - 10	Gold Coast Titans	28 June 2015, 2:00pm	Bluetongue Stadium (Fox Sports)		12,569
Wests Tigers	12 - 35	Penrith Panthers	28 June 2015, 4:00pm	Leichhardt Oval (Nine Network)		14,234
Canterbury-Bankstown Bulldogs	20 - 4	Melbourne Storm	29 June 2015, 7:00pm	Belmore Sportsground (Fox Sports)		16,764

=== Round 17 ===
Home	Score	Away	Match information
Home	Score	Away	Date and time (Local)	Venue (Broadcaster)	Referees	Attendance
Penrith Panthers	20 - 6	South Sydney Rabbitohs	3 July 2015, 7:45pm	Pepper Stadium (Nine Network)		14,068
St. George Illawarra Dragons	12 - 18	North Queensland Cowboys	4 July 2015, 7:30pm	WIN Stadium (Fox Sports)		11,813
Manly-Warringah Sea Eagles	28 - 16	Cronulla-Sutherland Sharks	5 July 2015, 4:00pm	Brookvale Oval (Nine Network)		14,881
Wests Tigers	16 - 28	Parramatta Eels	6 July 2015, 7:00pm	ANZ Stadium (Fox Sports)		15,347
BYE: Brisbane Broncos; Canberra Raiders; Canterbury-Bankstown Bulldogs; Gold Coast Titans; Melbourne Storm; Newcastle Knights; New Zealand Warriors; Sydney Roosters

=== Round 18 ===
Home	Score	Away	Match information
Home	Score	Away	Date and time (Local)	Venue (Broadcaster)	Referees	Attendance
Canberra Raiders	36 - 22	Newcastle Knights	10 July 2015, 7:45pm	GIO Stadium (Nine Network)		6,015
Penrith Panthers	4 - 24	Sydney Roosters	11 July 2015, 5:30pm	Pepper Stadium (Fox Sports)		13,654
Canterbury-Bankstown Bulldogs	8 - 16	Brisbane Broncos	11 July 2015, 7:30pm	ANZ Stadium (Fox Sports)		16,253
New Zealand Warriors	28 - 14	Melbourne Storm	12 July 2015, 4:00pm	Mt Smart Stadium (Fox Sports)		17,278
Cronulla-Sutherland Sharks	28 - 8	St. George Illawarra Dragons	12 July 2015, 4:00pm	Remondis Stadium (Nine Network)		12,792
Gold Coast Titans	6 - 38	Manly-Warringah Sea Eagles	13 July 2015, 7:00pm	Cbus Super Stadium (Fox Sports)		9,632
BYE: North Queensland Cowboys; Parramatta Eels; South Sydney Rabbitohs; Wests Tigers

=== Round 19 ===
Home	Score	Away	Match information
Home	Score	Away	Date and time (Local)	Venue (Broadcaster)	Referees	Attendance
Parramatta Eels	4-28	Canterbury-Bankstown Bulldogs	17 July 2015, 7:35pm	ANZ Stadium (Nine Network)		17,082
Melbourne Storm	52-10	Penrith Panthers	17 July 2015, 7:35pm	AAMI Park (Nine Network)		11,956
Canberra Raiders	20 - 21	Cronulla-Sutherland Sharks	18 July 2015, 3:00pm	GIO Stadium (Fox Sports)		9,853
Newcastle Knights	30 - 2	Gold Coast Titans	18 July 2015, 5:30pm	Hunter Stadium (Fox Sports)		10, 546
St. George Illawarra Dragons	8 - 24	South Sydney Rabbitohs	18 July 2015, 7:30pm	Sydney Cricket Ground (Fox Sports)		18,217
Sydney Roosters	24 - 0	New Zealand Warriors	19 July 2015, 2:00pm	Allianz Stadium (Fox Sports)		16,301
Brisbane Broncos	42 - 16	Wests Tigers	19 July 2015, 4:00pm	Suncorp Stadium (Nine Network)		37,260
Manly-Warringah Sea Eagles	12 - 30	North Queensland Cowboys	20 July 2015, 7:00pm	Brookvale Oval (Fox Sports)		7,643

=== Round 20 ===
Home	Score	Away	Match information
Home	Score	Away	Date and time (Local)	Venue (Broadcaster)	Referees	Attendance
Wests Tigers	8 - 33	Sydney Roosters	24 July 2015, 7:35pm	ANZ Stadium (Nine Network)		10,186
Brisbane Broncos	34 - 0	Gold Coast Titans	24 July 2015, 7:35pm	Suncorp Stadium (Nine Network)		27,665
New Zealand Warriors	12 - 32	Manly-Warringah Sea Eagles	25 July 2015, 5:00pm	Mt Smart Stadium (Fox Sports)		15, 812
South Sydney Rabbitohs	52 - 6	Newcastle Knights	25 July 2015, 5:30pm	ANZ Stadium (Fox Sports)		14,603
Melbourne Storm	22 - 4	St. George Illawarra Dragons	25 July 2015, 7:30pm	McLean Park (Fox Sports)		14,532
Penrith Panthers	24 - 34	Canberra Raiders	26 July 2015, 2:00pm	Pepper Stadium (Fox Sports)		8,048
Canterbury-Bankstown Bulldogs	16 - 18	Cronulla-Sutherland Sharks	26 July 2015, 4:00pm	Belmore Sportsground (Nine Network)		19,005
North Queensland Cowboys	46 - 4	Parramatta Eels	27 July 2015, 7:00pm	1300SMILES Stadium (Fox Sports)		13,767

=== Round 21 ===
Home	Score	Away	Match information
Home	Score	Away	Date and time (Local)	Venue	Referees	Attendance
Sydney Roosters	38 - 28	Canterbury-Bankstown Bulldogs	31 July 2015, 7:45pm	Allianz Stadium (Nine Network)		13,589
Wests Tigers	34 - 16	Melbourne Storm	31 July 2015, 7:45pm	Leichhardt Oval (Nine Network)		7,419
New Zealand Warriors	14 - 18	Cronulla-Sutherland Sharks	1 August 2015, 5:00pm	Mt Smart Stadium (Fox Sports)		12,481
North Queensland Cowboys	32 - 24	Canberra Raiders	1 August 2015, 5:30pm	1300SMILES Stadium (Fox Sports)		16, 207
Manly-Warringah Sea Eagles	44 - 14	Brisbane Broncos	1 August 2015, 7:30pm	Bluetongue Stadium (Fox Sports)		16,280
St. George Illawarra Dragons	46 - 24	Newcastle Knights	2 August 2015, 2:00pm	Jubilee Oval (Fox Sports)		10,236
South Sydney Rabbitohs	20 - 16	Penrith Panthers	2 August 2015, 4:00pm	ANZ Stadium (Nine Network)		13,391
Gold Coast Titans	24 - 14	Parramatta Eels	3 August 2015, 7:00pm	Cbus Super Stadium (Fox Sports)		7,495

=== Round 22 ===
Home	Score	Away	Match information
Home	Score	Away	Date and time (Local)	Venue	Referees	Attendance
Manly-Warringah Sea Eagles	28 - 8	South Sydney Rabbitohs	7 August 2015, 7:45pm	Brookvale Oval (Nine Network)		15,083
Brisbane Broncos	16 - 18	Canterbury-Bankstown Bulldogs	7 August 2015, 7:45pm	Suncorp Stadium (Nine Network)		34,082
New Zealand Warriors	0 - 36	St. George Illawarra Dragons	8 August 2015, 5:00pm	Westpac Stadium (Fox Sports)		18,317
Cronulla-Sutherland Sharks	30 - 18	North Queensland Cowboys	8 August 2015, 5:30pm	Remondis Stadium (Fox Sports)		13,878
Parramatta Eels	10 - 4	Penrith Panthers	8 August 2015, 7:00pm	TIO Stadium (Fox Sports)		8340
Melbourne Storm	36 - 14	Gold Coast Titans	9 August 2015, 2:00pm	AAMI Park (Fox Sports)		10,521
Newcastle Knights	22 - 38	Sydney Roosters	9 August 2015, 4:00pm	Hunter Stadium (Nine Network)		17,718
Canberra Raiders	18 - 20	Wests Tigers	10 August 2015, 7:00pm	GIO Stadium (Fox Sports)		8,704

=== Round 23 ===
Home	Score	Away	Match information
Home	Score	Away	Date and time (Local)	Venue	Referees	Attendance
North Queensland Cowboys	18 - 31	South Sydney Rabbitohs	13 August 2015, 7:45pm	1300SMILES Stadium (Nine Network)		16,685
Brisbane Broncos	32 - 6	St. George Illawarra Dragons	14 August 2015, 7:45pm	Suncorp Stadium (Nine Network)		33,480
Wests Tigers	18 - 24	Newcastle Knights	15 August 2015, 3:00pm	Campbelltown Stadium (Fox Sports)		10,963
Penrith Panthers	24 - 10	New Zealand Warriors	15 August 2015, 5:30pm	Pepper Stadium (Fox Sports)		6774
Sydney Roosters	28 - 18	Parramatta Eels	15 August 2015, 7:30pm	Allianz Stadium (Fox Sports)		11,255
Canberra Raiders	24 - 26	Manly-Warringah Sea Eagles	16 August 2015, 2:00pm	GIO Stadium (Fox Sports)		13,113
Canterbury-Bankstown Bulldogs	36 - 14	Gold Coast Titans	16 August 2015, 4:00pm	Bluetongue Stadium (Nine Network)		11,021
Cronulla-Sutherland Sharks	2 - 30	Melbourne Storm	17 August 2015, 7:00pm	Remondis Stadium (Fox Sports)		10,269

=== Round 24 ===
Home	Score	Away	Match information
Home	Score	Away	Date and time (Local)	Venue	Referees	Attendance
St. George Illawarra Dragons	19 - 12	Penrith Panthers	20 August 2015, 7:45pm	WIN Stadium (Nine Network)	Alan Shortall, Ashley Klein	9,145
South Sydney Rabbitohs	18 - 32	Canterbury-Bankstown Bulldogs	21 August 2015, 7:45pm	ANZ Stadium (Nine Network)	Jared Maxwell, Gavin Morris	26,503
Cronulla-Sutherland Sharks	40 - 18	Wests Tigers	22 August 2015, 3:00pm	Remondis Stadium (Fox Sports)	Grant Atkins, Matt Noyen	15,738
New Zealand Warriors	16 - 50	North Queensland Cowboys	22 August 2015, 7:30pm	Mt Smart Stadium (Fox Sports)	Matt Cecchin, Adam Devcich	14,412
Sydney Roosters	12 - 10	Brisbane Broncos	22 August 2015, 7:30pm	Allianz Stadium (Fox Sports)	Gavin Badger, Gerard Sutton	19,137
Gold Coast Titans	28 - 12	Canberra Raiders	23 August 2015, 2:00pm	Cbus Super Stadium (Fox Sports)	Gavin Reynolds and Chris Sutton.	8,762
Manly-Warringah Sea Eagles	16 - 20	Parramatta Eels	23 August 2015, 4:00pm	Brookvale Oval (Nine Network)	Alan Shortall, Ben Cummins.	11,018
Melbourne Storm	6 - 20	Newcastle Knights	24 August 2015, 7:00pm	AAMI Park (Fox Sports)	Chris James, Henry Perenara	8,743

=== Round 25 ===
Home	Score	Away	Match information
Home	Score	Away	Date and time (Local)	Venue	Referees	Attendance
South Sydney Rabbitohs	12 - 47	Brisbane Broncos	27 August 2015, 7:45pm	Allianz Stadium (Nine Network)	Matt Cecchin, Gavin Morris	12,036
Manly-Warringah Sea Eagles	10 - 46	Sydney Roosters	28 August 2015, 7:45pm	Brookvale Oval (Nine Network)	Jared Maxwell, Gavin Morris	12,911
Parramatta Eels	28 - 35	Cronulla-Sutherland Sharks	29 August 2015, 3:00pm	Pirtek Stadium (Fox Sports)	Matt Ceccin, Grant Atkins	11,778
Newcastle Knights	18 - 20	Canterbury-Bankstown Bulldogs	29 August 2015, 5:30pm	Hunter Stadium (Fox Sports)	Adam Devcich, Chris James	23,604
Melbourne Storm	14 - 6	North Queensland Cowboys	29 August 2015, 7:30pm	AAMI Park (Fox Sports)	Ben Cummins, Alan Shortall	15,214
Wests Tigers	50 - 16	New Zealand Warriors	30 August 2015, 2:00pm	Campbelltown Stadium (Fox Sports)	Gavin Reynolds, Chris Sutton	6,711
Gold Coast Titans	28 - 26	St. George Illawarra Dragons	30 August 2015, 4:00pm	Cbus Super Stadium (Nine Network)	Ashley Klein, Gavin Morris	12,335
Canberra Raiders	34 - 18	Penrith Panthers	31 August 2015, 7:00pm	GIO Stadium (Fox Sports)	Henry Perenara, Matt Noyen	6,717

=== Round 26 ===
Home	Score	Away	Match information
Home	Score	Away	Date and time (Local)	Venue	Referees	Attendance
Brisbane Broncos	8 - 15	Melbourne Storm	3 September 2015, 7:45pm	Suncorp Stadium (Nine Network)		44,015
Sydney Roosters	30 - 0	South Sydney Rabbitohs	4 September 2015, 7:45pm	Allianz Stadium (Nine Network)		25,019
Penrith Panthers	30 - 12	Newcastle Knights	5 September 2015, 3:00pm	Pepper Stadium (Fox Sports)		8,936
St. George Illawarra Dragons	32 - 30	Wests Tigers	5 September 2015, 5:30pm	ANZ Stadium (Fox Sports)		17,685
North Queensland Cowboys	42 - 12	Gold Coast Titans	5 September 2015, 7:30pm	1300SMILES Stadium (Fox Sports)		16,977
Parramatta Eels	24 - 28	Canberra Raiders	6 September 2015, 2:00pm	Pirtek Stadium (Fox Sports)		10,515
Cronulla-Sutherland Sharks	12 - 14	Manly-Warringah Sea Eagles	6 September 2015, 4:00pm	Remondis Stadium (Nine Network)	Alan Shortall, Ben Cummins.	19,146
Canterbury-Bankstown Bulldogs	26 - 22	New Zealand Warriors	6 September 2015, 6:30pm	ANZ Stadium (Fox Sports)	Grant Atkins, Ashley Klein	14,821

== Finals series ==
Qualifying and elimination finals
11 Sept, Sydney Football Stadium
1	Sydney Roosters	18
4	Melbourne	20
12 Sept, Stadium Australia
5	Canterbury	11
8	St. George Illawarra	10
13 Sept, Sydney Football Stadium
6	Cronulla	28
7	Souths	12
12 Sept, Lang Park
2	Brisbane	16
3	North Queensland	12

Semi-finals
18 Sept, Sydney Football Stadium
Sydney Roosters	38
Canterbury	12
19 Sept, Willows Sports Complex
North Queensland	39
Cronulla	0

Preliminary finals
26 Sept, Melbourne Rectangular Stadium
Melbourne	12
North Queensland	32
25 Sept, Lang Park
Brisbane	31
Sydney Roosters	12

Grand final
4 Oct, Stadium Australia
Brisbane	16
North Queensland	17

=== Qualifying and Elimination Finals ===
1st Qualifying Final

11 September 2015
8:00pm

Sydney Roosters	18 – 20	Melbourne Storm
Tries: Sio Siua Taukeiaho (19') 1 Shaun Kenny Dowall (65') 1 Blake Ferguson (73') 1 Goals: James Maloney 3/4 (20', 32' pen, 74')	1st: 8 - 6; 2nd: 10 - 14	Tries: 1 (10') Marika Koroibete; 1 (54') Kurt Mann; 1 (71') Tim Glasby; Goals: 4/4 Cameron Smith (12', 48' pen, 56', 72')

Allianz Stadium
Attendance: 20,521
Referee: Ben Cummins, Alan Shortall

1st Elimination Final

12 September 2015
6:00pm

Canterbury Bankstown Bulldogs	11 – 10	St George Illawarra Dragons
Tries: Brett Morris (11') 1 Shaun Lane (78') 1 Goals: Moses Mbye (12') 1/2; Field goals: Josh Reynolds (84') 1	1st: 6 - 0; 2nd: 4 - 10; GP: 1 - 0	Tries: 1 (70') Etonia Nabuli; Goals: 3/3 Gareth Widdop (71', 75' pen, 80' pen)

ANZ Stadium
Attendance: 33,854
Referee: Jared Maxwell, Gavin Morris

2nd Qualifying Final

12 September 2015
8:00pm

Brisbane Broncos	16 – 12	North Queensland Cowboys
Tries: Ben Hunt (27') 1 Anthony Milford (65') 1 Goals: Corey Parker 4/4 (9' pen, 29', 60' pen, 67')	1st: 8 - 2; 2nd: 8 - 10	Tries: 1 (47') Antonio Winterstein; 1 (71') Johnathan Thurston; Goals: 2/3 Johnathan Thurston (34' pen, 72')

Suncorp Stadium
Attendance: 50,388
Referee: Gerard Sutton, Gavin Badger

2nd Elimination Final

13 September 2015
4:10pm

Cronulla Sutherland Sharks	28 – 12	South Sydney Rabbitohs
Tries: Jack Bird (21') 1 Wade Graham (32') 1 Anthony Tupou (36') 1 Sam Tagataese (61') 1 Goals: Michael Gordon 6/6 (22', 33', 38', 51' pen, 62', 65' pen)	1st: 18 - 0; 2nd: 10 - 12	Tries: 1 (67') Dylan Walker; 1 (76') Chris Grevsmuhl; Goals: 2/2 Adam Reynolds (67', 77')

Allianz Stadium
Attendance: 27,345
Referee: Matt Cecchin, Ashley Klein

=== Semi finals ===
1st Semi Final

18 September 2015
8:00pm

Sydney Roosters	38 – 12	Canterbury Bankstown Bulldogs
Tries: Shaun Kenny-Dowall 3 (11', 65', 76'); Kane Evans (51') 1 Roger Tuivasa-Sheck (54') 1 Boyd Cordner (72') 1 Goals: James Maloney 7/7 (9' pen, 12', 52', 55', 67', 74', 78')	1st: 8 - 4; 2nd: 30 - 8	Tries: 1 (27') Tim Lafai; 1 (60') Damien Cook; 1 (80') Curtis Rona; Goals: Tim Lafai 0/1; Tim Browne 0/1; Moses Mbye 0/1

Allianz Stadium
Attendance: 35,711
Referee: Matt Cecchin, Ben Cummins

2nd Semi Final

19 September 2015
8:00pm

North Queensland Cowboys	39 – 0	Cronulla Sutherland Sharks
Tries: Michael Morgan (5', 46') 2 Justin O'Neill (16') 1 Scott Bolton (32') 1 Antonio Winterstein (61') 1 Kyle Feldt (68') 1 Ethan Lowe (77') 1 Goals: Johnathan Thurston 5/8 (3' pen, 17', 33', 47', 68'); Field goals: Johnathan Thurston (40') 1	1st: 19 - 0; 2nd: 20 - 0	Tries: Goals:

1300SMILES Stadium
Attendance: 21,683
Referee: Gerard Sutton, Gavin Badger

=== Preliminary Finals ===
1st Preliminary Final

25 September 2015
8:00pm

Brisbane Broncos	31 – 12	Sydney Roosters
Tries: Darius Boyd (2') 1 Ben Hunt (11') 1 Andrew McCullough (19') 1 Corey Oates (40') 1 Anthony Milford (48') 1 Jack Reed (59') 1 Goals: Corey Parker (3', 20') 2/4; Jordan Kahu (49') 1/2; Field goals: Anthony Milford (62') 1	1st: 20 - 12; 2nd: 11 - 0	Tries: 2 (23, 28) Blake Ferguson; Goals: 2/2 (24', 30') James Maloney

Suncorp Stadium
Attendance: 51,826
Referee: Gerard Sutton, Gavin Badger

2nd Preliminary Final

26 September 2015
8:00pm

Melbourne Storm	12 – 32	North Queensland Cowboys
Tries: Cooper Cronk (10') 1 Tohu Harris (35') 1 Goals: Cameron Smith (11', 36') 2/2	1st: 12 - 16; 2nd: 0 - 16	Tries: 2 (14', 21') Justin O'Neill; 2 (40', 69') Gavin Cooper; 2 (54, 57') Michael Morgan; Goals: 4/6 Johnathan Thurston (22', 40', 58, 71')

AAMI Park
Attendance: 29,315
Referee: Matt Cecchin, Ben Cummins

== Grand final ==
Sunday, 4 October 2015
7:30pm

Brisbane Broncos	16 – 17	North Queensland Cowboys
Tries: Corey Oates (7') 1 Jack Reed (34') 1 Goals: Corey Parker 2/2 (6' pen, 9'); Jordan Kahu 2/2 (35', 43' pen)	1st: 14 - 12; 2nd: 2 - 4 GP: 0 - 1	Tries: 1 (10') Justin O'Neill; 1 (25') James Tamou; 1 (80') Kyle Feldt; Goals: 2/3 (12', 26') Johnathan Thurston; Field goals: 1 (83') Johnathan Thurston

ANZ Stadium
Attendance: 82,758
Referee: Gerard Sutton & Ben Cummins
