= Al-Masri =

Masri, Masry, Misri or Al-Masri and El-Masry (Arabic: المصري, commonly spelled in the Egyptian dialect as المصرى) is Semitic language (Arabic and Hebrew) last name that literally means the Egyptian. The surname is commonly found in modern Egyptians and can be found in Syria, Jordan, Lebanon, Palestine, Iran, Sudan, Israeli Jews and Arabs.

== Al-Masri ==
- Amir El-Masry (born 1990), Egyptian-British actor.
- Ibrahim El-Masry (born 1989), Egyptian handball player for Al Ahly and the Egyptian national team.
- Abu Uday el-Masry bin el-Emam (born 903), an Egyptian judge, religious scholar, founder of Emam family, a noble Egyptian family from which many judges and princes appeared in the Middle Ages.
- Meir Masri (1984) is an Israeli writer, professor and scholar of political science.
- Mahienour El-Massry (born 1986), Egyptian human rights lawyer and political activist from Alexandria
- Sama El Masry (born 1975), Egyptian actress, singer and belly dancer
- Munib al-Masri (born 1934), Palestinian industrialist, and patriarch of the Palestinian Masri family
- Hadi Al Masri (born 1986), Syrian football player
- Hamdi Al Masri (born 1986), Syrian football player
- Hazem El Masri (born 1976), Lebanese Australian former professional rugby league footballer
- Bashar Al-Masri (born 1961), Palestinian-American businessman
- Khalid al-Masri, suspected al-Qaeda member
- Khalid El-Masri (born 1963), German and Lebanese torture victim formerly detained by the United States after extraordinary rendition
- Mohammad Hasan Khalil al-Hakim (died 2008), known as Abu Jihad al-Masri, propaganda chief for al-Qaeda
- Mohammed Deif, (born Mohammed Diab Ibrahim al-Masri, 1965), Palestinian militant and military leader of Hamas
- Munib al-Masri (born 1934), Palestinian industrialist and statesman
- Hisham Al-Masri (born 1973), Syrian former swimmer
- Majida Al-Masri, Palestinian politician
- Maram al-Masri (born 1962), Syrian-French writer
- Mutaher al-Masri, Yemeni politician
- Nader al-Masri (born 1980), Palestinian Olympic athlete
- Saeed al-Masri (1955–2010), Egyptian suspected al-Qaeda member
- Saif al-Islam al-Masri, al-Qaeda member
- Taher Masri (born Taher Nashat al-Masri), Jordanian politician
- Yasmine Al Massri (born 1978), Palestinian Egyptian actress and human rights advocate
- Yasser Al-Masri (1970–2018), Kuwaiti-born Jordanian-Palestinian actor
- Zafer al-Masri (1940–1986), Palestinian businessman
- Samer al-Masry (born 1969), Syrian actor
- Dato Dr. Sheikh Muszaphar Shukor Al-Masri Sheikh Mustapha Al-Masri (born 1972), Malaysian astronaut

== El-Masri ==
- Abdalla El-Masri (born 1962), Lebanese-Russian composer
- Iris Habib Elmasry (1910–1994), Egyptian Coptic Historian
- Hazem El Masri (born 1976), Lebanese-Australian former professional rugby league footballer
- Samer El Masri, Lebanese-Australian former rugby league player
- Rafed El-Masri (born 1982), German-Syrian swimmer
- Sherif El-Masri (born 1990), Canadian-Tunisian football player

== Misri ==
- Vikram Misri (born 1964), Indian diplomat of Indian Foreign Service, currently serving as the 35th Foreign Secretary of India since July 2024.
- Esa Misri (born 1969), Indian professional bodybuilder
- Angela Misri, Kashmiri Canadian novelist and journalist

== See also ==
- Masri (disambiguation)
