= Misra =

Misra or Mishra may refer to:

- Motor Industry Software Reliability Association
- MISRA C, a software development standard for the C programming language
- Misra', half of a bayt in Arabic, Persian, Turkic and Urdu poetry
- Mishra or Misra, an Indian and Nepalese surname
  - Bhagiratha, a figure in Hindu mythology, considered to be the ancestor of Mishras
- Mishra (Magic: The Gathering), a character in The Brothers' War novel
- Misra Records, a record label
- A variation of the classical Arabic name for Egypt, مِصر (Miṣr, IPA: [mi̠sˤr])
- Misra (month) (مسرا, Masrá), the Egyptian Arabic name for a month of the Coptic calendar

== See also ==
- Misr (disambiguation)
- Mushaira, gathering of Urdu poets
