= Rafiq Shadani =

Rafiq Shadani was an Indian poet and satirist who wrote in the Awadhi, Urdu and Hindi languages. He was considered a humorist, and often infused folk-themes with satirical political humour. He authored 13 books of humorous poetry.

== Life ==
Rafiq Shadani's family was from Mumtaznagar, Faizabad district, Uttar Pradesh state in North-Central India, but he was born in Burma in March 1934 where his father, Imamuddin, was a merchant of tobacco, oil and perfume. He began composing and reading his humor poetry at Mushairas (poetry meets) beginning in 1962. A car accident in Bahraich proved fatal and he died on 9 February 2010. He was also awarded Maati Ratan Samman by Shaheed Shodha Sansthan.

== Work ==
Though he never penned down his work, he loved going to Mushairas and read his shayaris out. His works were collected and published by Shaheed Shodha Sansthan posthumously under the name Jazbaat.
