= 2007 Finals Series =

2007 Finals Series can refer to:

- 2007 AFL finals series
- 2007 NRL Finals Series
