= Mosseri =

Mosseri is a Hebrew surname. It may be a patronymic derivation from the name "Moses" It may also be derived from the word Masri/Misr, meaning "Egyptian"/"Egypt", i.e., may refer to a person hailing from Egypt, cf. "Mizrahi".

- Abe Mosseri (born 1974), American backgammon and poker player
- Adam Mosseri (born 1983), American businessman
- Emile Mosseri (born 1985), American composer, pianist, singer and producer
- Ido Mosseri (born 1978), Israeli actor, musician, director and television presenter
- Jacques Mosseri (1936–2025), Colombian architect
- Tal Mosseri (born 1975), Israeli actor, singer and television presenter
