= Masri (disambiguation) =

Masri, also Masry, Massri and Massry, is a slang word meaning Egyptian. It also refers to the Egyptian Arabic, spoken by most contemporary Egyptians.

Masri, Masry, Massri and Massry may also refer to:

- Egyptians, people native to Egypt and the citizens of that country sharing a common culture and dialect

== People ==
- Bashar Masri (born 1961), Palestinian American entrepreneur
- Meir Masri (born 1984), Israeli author, professor and scholar of political science at the Hebrew University of Jerusalem
- Moisés Saba Masri (1963-2010), Mexican billionaire of Syrian origin
- Eliyahu Masri (born 1968), Sephardi Chief Rabbi of Buenos Aires of Syrian origin
- Georges Masri (born 1968), Syrian Melkite Catholic archbishop in Aleppo
- Mai Masri (born 1959), Palestinian filmmaker
- Mark Masri (born 1973), Canadian-Lebanese singer, songwriter and music producer
- Mona Masri (born 1985), Swedish-Lebanese journalist, critic and radio host
- Tariq Masri (born 1973), American bassoonist
- Edward L. Masry (1932-2005), American lawyer of Syrian origin
- Yair Massri (born 1991), American Rabbi of Syrian origin
- Shaul G. Massry (1930-2023), American medical researcher

== Other uses ==
- Massry Prize, American scientific prize awarded every year by the Meira and Shaul Massry Foundation
- El-Masry, Egyptian football team in Port Said

== See also ==
- Al-Masri, a surname
- Mosseri, a surname
