= Middle East Pact =

Middle East Pact, formerly AFEMO (The Francophone Association for Middle East Studies), was created in February 2004 by a group of French-speaking activists. Since its creation by Meir Masri, Middle East Pact (MEP) has assumed the mission of making French-speaking academia aware of numerous challenges that confront the people of this region, particularly with regards to the violations of human and minority rights, and problems linked with insecurity.

In France, AFEMO had offices for four years at the Sciences-Politiques Institute at Toulouse and at Lille. In February 2008, the organization changed its name to Middle East Pact and has since been working as an international study and information network as well as a pressure pro-Israel group in Europe. Its head office is now in Paris.
