= Hazem El Masri =

Lebanese-Australian rugby league footballer

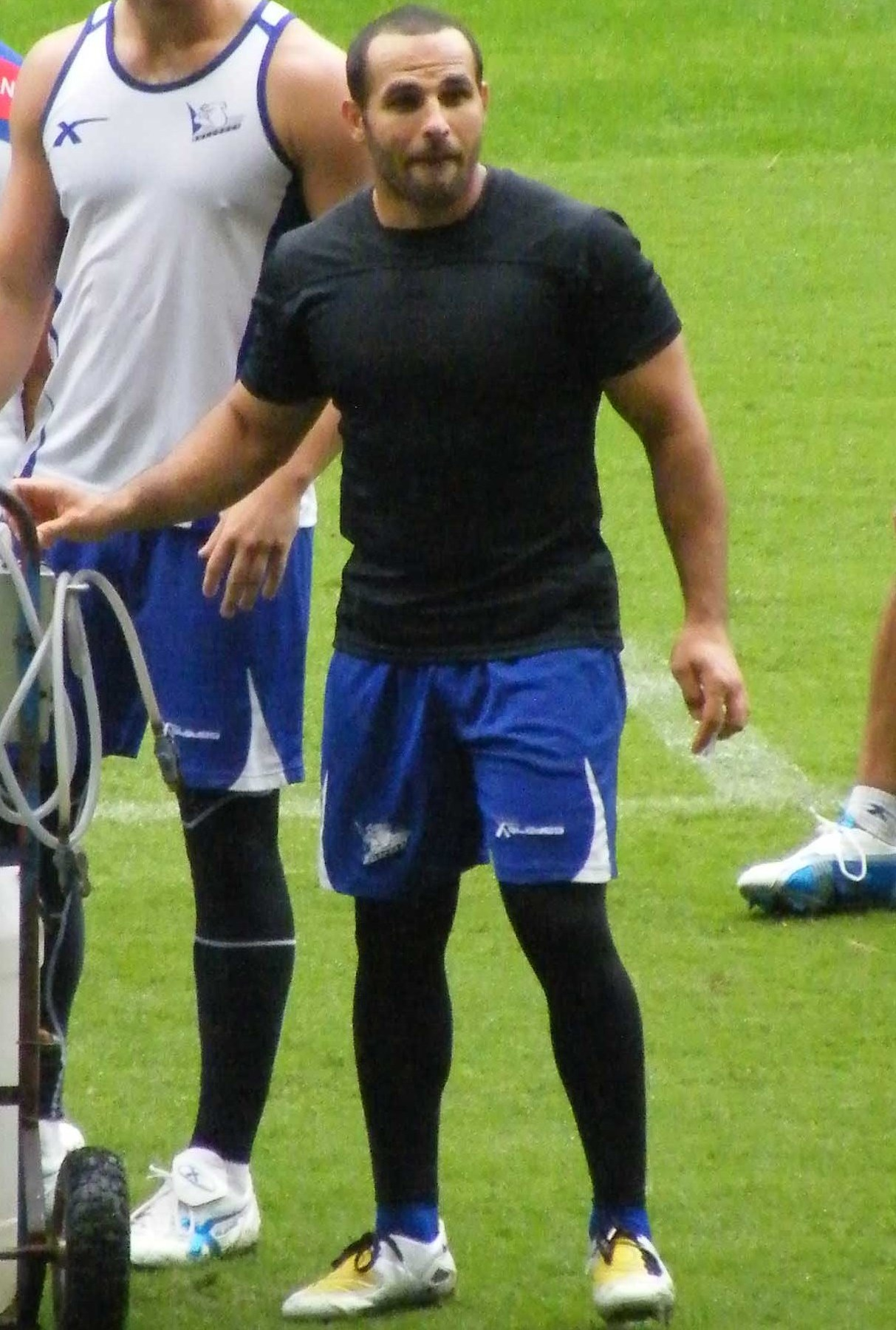

Personal information
- Born: 1 April 1976 (age 50) Tripoli, Lebanon

Playing information
- Height: 178 cm (5 ft 10 in)
- Weight: 90 kg (14 st 2 lb)
- Position: Wing, Fullback
Club
Years	Team	Pld	T	G	FG	P
1996–09	Canterbury Bulldogs	317	159	891	0	2418
Representative
Years	Team	Pld	T	G	FG	P
1999–03	Lebanon	8	12	44	0	136
2001–07	City NSW	5	1	14	0	32
2002	Australia	1	0	4	0	8
2007	New South Wales	1	1	3	0	10
- Relatives: Samer El Masri (brother)

Hazem El Masri (Arabic: حازم المصري; born 1 April 1976) is a Lebanese Australian former professional rugby league footballer who played as a winger in the 1990s and 2000s. An international representative for Australia and Lebanon, and a New South Wales State of Origin representative goal-kicking wing, he played his entire club football career in Sydney with Canterbury with whom he won the 2004 NRL Premiership. In 2009 (his final season in the NRL) El Masri took the record for the highest-ever point scorer in premiership history and for a record sixth time was the NRL's top point scorer for the season. He also became only the seventh player in history to score over 150 NRL tries, having primarily played on the wing, but also at fullback.

El Masri is a self-identified devout Muslim. He is widely respected for his community work with young people, winning the NRL's Ken Stephen Award in 2002. The award recognises players who contribute to the betterment of their community away from rugby league.

El Masri, widely regarded as one of the greatest goalkickers ever seen on a rugby league field, scored the third most points (2,418) by any player in NRL history.

== Background ==
El Masri was born in Tripoli, Lebanon on 1 April 1976 to ethnic Lebanese parents, Khaled and Amal. He emigrated to Australia with his family from there in 1988 when he was 11 years old. He began playing soccer at an early age but during his senior years in high school switched to rugby league, joining a local club, the Enfield Federals. While playing for Belmore Boys High School in 1994, El Masri was spotted by Canterbury-Bankstown Bulldogs development officers and was invited to trials for their Jersey Flegg side. The following year he was elevated to the President's Cup squad.

== Playing career ==
=== 1990s ===
El Masri debuted in the Canterbury-Bankstown Bulldogs first grade team during the 1996 ARL season. Initially, El Masri was not the first choice goal-kicker at the Bulldogs over the more renowned kicker Daryl Halligan. It was not until Halligan was injured in 1997 that El Masri first kicked for the club. In that year's Super League season, El Masri scored a memorable hat-trick against English club Halifax.

El Masri had become a regular member of the Canterbury-Bankstown squad by the 1998 NRL season. Although his side reached the 1998 NRL Grand Final, he did not play in Canterbury's defeat by the Broncos.

In 1999, El Masri made his debut for Lebanon in a Mediterranean Cup game against Morocco. In this match he scored a total of 48 points, the highest number of points ever scored by one player in an international match.

=== 2000s ===
The Lebanon nation side qualified for their first ever World Cup in 2000, with El Masri as captain. He played in all three of Lebanon's World Cup games, beginning with Lebanon's first ever World Cup Match against New Zealand, which they lost 64–0. El Masri scored three tries and kicked six goals in their next two games, a 24–22 defeat to Wales and a 22–22 draw against the Cook Islands. Lebanon finished the group stage on one point and did not advance. His brother, Samer El Masri, also played for Lebanon during the tournament. In 2001, El Masri debuted for the City New South Wales side in the first of five appearances.

In 2002, El Masri topped the League's point-scoring table for the first time and rejected a $2 million offer from the South Sydney Rabbitohs, opting to stay with the Bulldogs. In 2002, he played for the Australian team against New Zealand. El Masri set a new record for most goals scored by a Bulldogs player in a single match with 11 against the South Sydney Rabbitohs in Round 21, 2003.

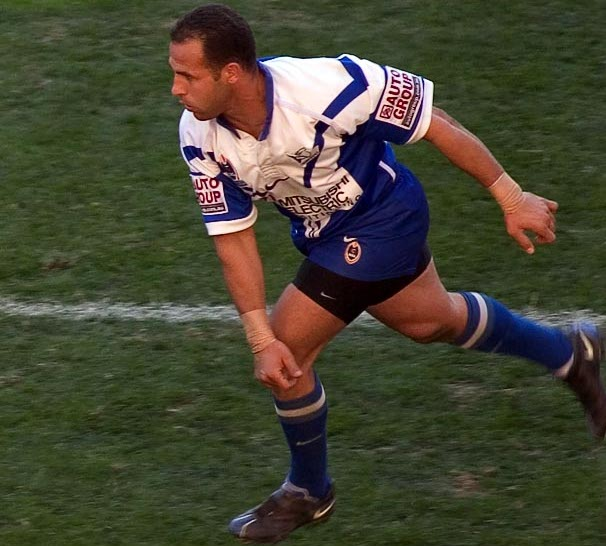
El Masri playing for the Bulldogs in 2004.

El Masri broke the National Rugby League point scoring record for a single season with 342 points (16 tries and 139 goals) in the 2004 season. He then played for Canterbury on the wing in their 2004 NRL grand final victory over cross-city rivals the Sydney Roosters, scoring a try and kicking two goals. As 2004 NRL premiers, the Canterbury-Bankstown Bulldogs faced Super League IX champions, Leeds, in the 2005 World Club Challenge. El Masri played on the wing, scoring two tries and kicking four goals in the Bulldogs' 32–39 loss.

El Masri set the Canterbury club's career points record, surpassing Daryl Halligan during the 2005 NRL season.

In 2006, El Masri broke another two club records: the most points scored for a single game (34 points, round 2 against the Wests Tigers) and the most first grade tries for Canterbury (123, Round 13 against the Newcastle Knights). He also kicked his 600th goal during that match.

El Masri broke the 1,900-point record after scoring 14 points in Round 8 of the 2007 NRL season against the Newcastle Knights, defeating them 30–16 and becoming the sixth player to ever surpass that point, along with Graham Eadie, Mick Cronin, Daryl Halligan, Jason Taylor and Andrew Johns. El Masri was called up to Game 3 of the 2007 State of Origin series to make his debut for New South Wales after Jamie Lyon was ruled out through injury. He kicked three conversions from the sideline, and scored the final try, giving him 10 points in total. Also in 2007, Bill Woods published an authorised biography, El Magic: the life of Hazem El Masri.

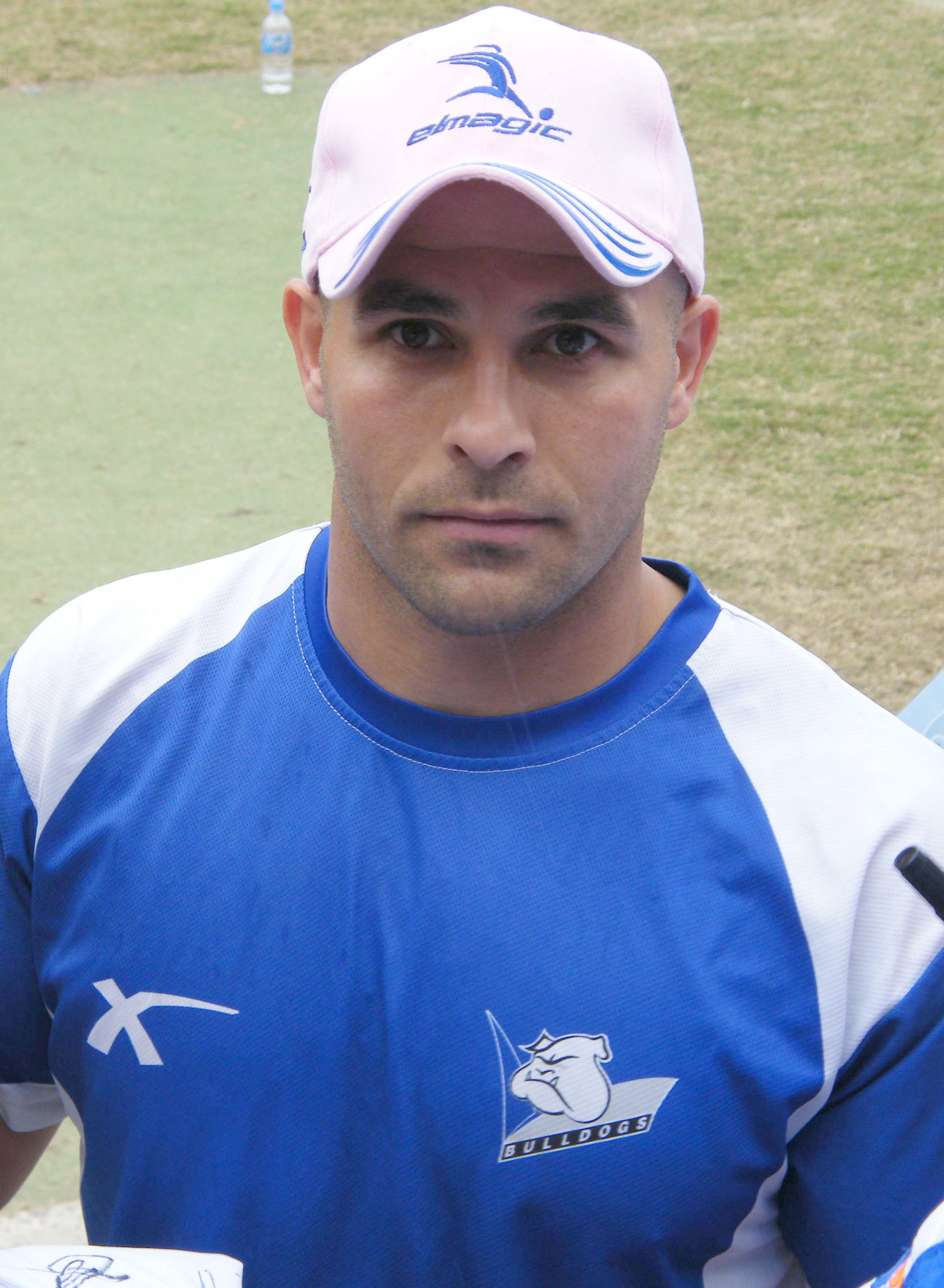
El Masri in 2009

El Masri broke the all-time highest NRL career point scoring record in front of a crowd of 19,791 against the Manly-Warringah Sea Eagles in round 1, 2009, with a penalty goal on a rainy Saturday night, giving him 2,208 points. On 15 May 2009, El Masri played his 300th game in the Bulldogs 20–18 defeat by the Dragons at Win Jubilee Stadium. He was the first Canterbury player to reach the milestone. He joined the exclusive '300' club behind, Darren Lockyer (355), Terry Lamb (349), Steve Menzies (349), Brad Fittler (336), Cliff Lyons (332), Andrew Ettingshausen (328), Geoff Gerard (320), Jason Croker (318), Paul Langmack (315), Ruben Wiki (312), Steve Price (306), Luke Ricketson (301) and Petero Civoniceva (300). In June 2009, El Masri announced that he would retire from the NRL at the end of the 2009 season. He played his 317th and final game on 25 September 2009 against the Parramatta Eels in the preliminary final in front of a crowd of 74,549 people, the largest finals crowd ever recorded for a non-grand final. Lebanon Cedars' coach John Elias approached El Masri to play a one-off European Cup tie for Lebanon against Russia in Tripoli in October 2009. El Masri considered accepting this invitation but found himself unable to do so.

El Masri set the NRL career point-scoring record of 2,418 points across 317 games, with 159 tries and 891 goals in 1087 attempts at 81.97%.

== Post-playing ==
After his retirement, El Masri made an appearance, kicking a goal, in the opening ceremony of Melbourne's new AAMI Park before the 2010 ANZAC Test. El Masri was approached to stand as the Liberal candidate for the seat of Lakemba at the 2011 state election.

== Personal life ==
In 2000, El Masri married a Saudi Arabian-born Palestinian woman, Arwa Abousamra. They have three children.

El Masri is a devout Muslim. He was one of the first Lebanese Australians to step forward in the name of friendship and understanding in the wake of the 2005 Cronulla riots after the clash between predominantly white Cronulla locals and Middle-Eastern Western Sydney beachgoers resulted in violence and increased racial tensions between the groups.

El Masri and his wife split in early 2014. He subsequently remarried. He was a White Ribbon Day ambassador. In October 2015, he was charged by New South Wales Police with assaulting his second wife, although the charge was dropped in 2016 based on a recording he had of the incident. In 2017, it was reported he and his first wife, Arwa had remarried.

In 2025, El Masri was inducted into the Bulldogs Hall of Fame.

== Footnotes ==
Preceded by Ivan Cleary; 1998–2004	Record-holder; Most points in an NRL season 2004–present	Succeeded by
Preceded by Andrew Johns; 2009	Record-holder; Most points in an NRL career 2009 (2,177) – 2019 (2,418)	Succeeded by Cameron Smith; 2019
