= 2007 NRL season results =

The 2007 NRL season consisted of 25 weekly regular season rounds, starting from 16 March and ending on 2 September, followed by four weeks of play-offs that culminated in a grand final on 30 September.

All times in fixture listings are Australian Eastern Standard Time.

== Round 1 ==
- Bulldogs' forward Sonny Bill Williams was sent off in the fourth minute of his 2007 season in the match against Newcastle, having made a hit on Newcastle captain Andrew Johns which was deemed to be a reckless high tackle. Williams pleaded guilty at the judiciary, and received a two-week suspension.
- A number of high-profile players were injured in this round, including Newcastle's Andrew Johns, Manly's Steve Menzies, Matt Orford and Steve Matai, and Brisbane's Darren Lockyer.
- Penrith were held scoreless for the first time since Round 18, 1999.
- A total 185,051 people witnessed these eight matches, making this the round with the highest total attendance in the history of the competition (previous record was 171,526 for Round 22, 1995).

Home	Score	Away	Match Information
Home	Score	Away	Date and Time	Venue	Referee	Crowd
Brisbane Broncos	16–23	North Queensland Cowboys	16 March 2007, 7:30 pm	Suncorp Stadium	Steve Clark	50,416
Melbourne Storm	18–16	Wests Tigers	16 March 2007, 7:30 pm	Olympic Park	Sean Hampstead	13,535
New Zealand Warriors	34–18	Parramatta Eels	17 March 2007, 5:30 pm	Mt Smart Stadium	Gavin Badger	13,587
Cronulla Sharks	18–0	Penrith Panthers	17 March 2007, 7:30 pm	Toyota Park	Ben Cummins	9,032
Manly Warringah Sea Eagles	32–6	Canberra Raiders	17 March 2007, 7:30 pm	Brookvale Oval	Jared Maxwell	13,522
Newcastle Knights	25–24	Bulldogs	18 March 2007, 2:00 pm	EnergyAustralia Stadium	Tony Archer	18,791
Gold Coast Titans	18–20	St George Illawarra Dragons	18 March 2007, 3:00 pm	Suncorp Stadium	Shayne Hayne	42,030
Sydney Roosters	6–18	South Sydney Rabbitohs	19 March 2007, 7:00 pm	Sydney Football Stadium	Paul Simpkins	24,127

== Round 2 ==
- South Sydney recorded two victories to open the season – the first time they have done so since being reinstated into the competition earlier in the decade.
- The New Zealand Warriors defeated the premiers from season 2006, Brisbane. This victory marks the first time in the club's history that the Warriors have won the first two games of a season.
- The Gold Coast Titans recorded their maiden victory, defeating the Cronulla Sharks.

Home	Score	Away	Match Information
Home	Score	Away	Date and Time	Venue	Referee	Crowd
St George Illawarra Dragons	12–16	Newcastle Knights	23 March 2007, 7:30 pm	OKI Jubilee Stadium	Steve Clark	12,340
Penrith Panthers	40–10	Bulldogs	23 March 2007, 7:30 pm	CUA Stadium	Ben Cummins	16,652
Wests Tigers	8–19	Manly Warringah Sea Eagles	24 March 2007, 5:30 pm	Leichhardt Oval	Tony Archer	15,185
Canberra Raiders	16–32	Melbourne Storm	24 March 2007, 7:30 pm	Canberra Stadium	Jared Maxwell	9,556
North Queensland Cowboys	43–6	Sydney Roosters	24 March 2007, 8:30 pm	Dairy Farmers Stadium	Gavin Badger	21,396
New Zealand Warriors	24–14	Brisbane Broncos	25 March 2007, 2:00 pm	Mt Smart Stadium	Paul Simpkins	16,738
South Sydney Rabbitohs	31–6	Parramatta Eels	25 March 2007, 3:00 pm	Telstra Stadium	Sean Hampstead	15,165
Gold Coast Titans	18–16	Cronulla Sharks	26 March 2007, 7:00 pm	Carrara Stadium	Shayne Hayne	17,946

== Round 3 ==
- Both Friday night games went into golden point extra time, with Penrith winning by one point and Parramatta winning by two points. It was just the 2nd time there were 2 Golden Point games on the same day, the other occasion was Round 19 2004 on the Sunday afternoon.
- The Roosters lost their third match in as many rounds, marking the club's worst start to a season since 1994.
- Broncos player, Justin Hodges, found himself in the rare situation of scoring 4 tries (equal club record) for a losing side.
- The Broncos also recorded their worst start to a season since 1999, and the worst start to a season by a defending premier since 2000.
- Contrastingly, Souths continued with their third straight win, the Rabbitohs' best start to a season since 1972.
- The Canberra Raiders, who were listed as wooden spoon favourites by numerous betting organisations, pulled out a 30-point trashing of Newcastle with young back, William Zillman scoring a hat-trick of tries.

Home	Score	Away	Match Information
Home	Score	Away	Date and Time	Venue	Referee	Crowd
Brisbane Broncos	28–29	Penrith Panthers	30 March 2007, 7:30 pm	Suncorp Stadium	Tony Archer	24,582
Parramatta Eels	22–20	Wests Tigers	30 March 2007, 7:30 pm	Parramatta Stadium	Steve Clark	18,142
St George Illawarra Dragons	18–22	North Queensland Cowboys	31 March 2007, 5:30 pm	WIN Stadium	Jarred Maxwell	10,232
Cronulla Sharks	16–26	South Sydney Rabbitohs	31 March 2007, 7:30 pm	Toyota Park	Paul Simpkins	17,866
Melbourne Storm	30–12	New Zealand Warriors	1 April 2007, 12:00 pm	Olympic Park	Shayne Hayne	12,874
Bulldogs	22–6	Gold Coast Titans	1 April 2007, 2:00 pm	Telstra Stadium	Gavin Badger	14,675
Sydney Roosters	8–30	Manly Warringah Sea Eagles	1 April 2007, 3:00 pm	Sydney Football Stadium	Sean Hampstead	11,976
Canberra Raiders	48–18	Newcastle Knights	2 April 2007, 7:00 pm	Canberra Stadium	Ben Cummins	13,109

== Round 4 ==
- Australia's Channel 9's televised game of South Sydney vs Bulldogs was the first time Souths had a prime-time televised Friday night match since 2002. The 34,315 crowd was a record at Telstra Stadium, and the highest for a regular season game in Sydney since Round 1, 2002 (when South Sydney were readmitted into the competition).
- Cronulla's winning margin of 36 over the St George Illawarra was Cronulla's highest against that club or its predecessors.
- South Sydney co-captain and kiwi international David Kidwell tore ligaments in his knee during the weekend at a family barbecue, an injury which ended Kidwell's season.

Home	Score	Away	Match Information
Home	Score	Away	Date and Time	Venue	Referee	Crowd
South Sydney Rabbitohs	10–34	Bulldogs	6 April 2007, 7:30 pm	Telstra Stadium	Shayne Hayne	34,315
Sydney Roosters	10–32	Brisbane Broncos	6 April 2007, 7:30 pm	Sydney Football Stadium	Paul Simpkins	11,476
Newcastle Knights	12–22	Melbourne Storm	7 April 2007, 5:30 pm	EnergyAustralia Stadium	Steve Clark	20,051
North Queensland Cowboys	25–24	Wests Tigers	7 April 2007, 7:30 pm	Dairy Farmers Stadium	Jarred Maxwell	21,879
Parramatta Eels	38–6	Canberra Raiders	7 April 2007, 7:30 pm	Parramatta Stadium	Gavin Badger	10,091
Manly Warringah Sea Eagles	13–10	New Zealand Warriors	8 April 2007, 2:00 pm	Brookvale Oval	Ben Cummins	16,418
Penrith Panthers	22–24	Gold Coast Titans	8 April 2007, 3:00 pm	CUA Stadium	Sean Hampstead	15,022
Cronulla Sharks	40–4	St George Illawarra Dragons	9 April 2007, 7:00 pm	Toyota Park	Tony Archer	19,137

== Round 5 ==
- On Tuesday 10 April, Newcastle halfback, Andrew Johns announced his retirement from rugby league because of a bulging disc in his neck.
- Bulldogs winger, Hazem El Masri played in his 250th first-grade match for the club.
- The Manly Warringah Sea Eagles remained undefeated after their win over the Bulldogs and marked the best start to a season by the club since 1997.
- A penalty try was awarded to the Cronulla Sharks in the club's golden-point loss to the Wests Tigers, the first time a penalty try had been awarded since Round 26 in the 2005 season.

Home	Score	Away	Match Information
Home	Score	Away	Date and Time	Venue	Referee	Crowd
Penrith Panthers	14–27	Parramatta Eels	13 April 2007, 7:30 pm	CUA Stadium	Shayne Hayne	18,756
Gold Coast Titans	28–16	Brisbane Broncos	13 April 2007, 7:30 pm	Suncorp Stadium	Steve Clark	47,686
St George Illawarra Dragons	10–24	Melbourne Storm	14 April 2007, 5:30 pm	Oki Jubilee Stadium	Ben Cummins	9,011
Bulldogs	14–16	Manly Warringah Sea Eagles	14 April 2007, 7:30 pm	Telstra Stadium	Paul Simpkins	20,269
New Zealand Warriors	34–14	North Queensland Cowboys	15 April 2007, 2:00 pm	Mt Smart Stadium	Tony Archer	11,260
South Sydney Rabbitohs	22–23	Newcastle Knights	15 April 2007, 2:00 pm	Bluetongue Central Coast Stadium	Gavin Badger	18,321
Wests Tigers	14–12	Cronulla Sharks	15 April 2007, 3:00 pm	Campbelltown Stadium	Sean Hampstead	17,566
Canberra Raiders	37–28	Sydney Roosters	16 April 2007, 7:00 pm	Canberra Stadium	Jarred Maxwell	15,862

== Round 6 ==
- Newcastle held special farewell celebrations for Andrew Johns in the home game against Brisbane, renaming the East grandstand of EnergyAustralia Stadium the "Andrew Johns Stand". In addition, in a first for the NRL, his number 7 jersey was retired for the match with half back Jarred Mullen wearing number 18.
- The Gold Coast Titans were fined $5,000 after coach John Cartwright and football manager Scott Sattler approached the video referee during the team's loss to the Manly Warringah Sea Eagles.

Home	Score	Away	Match Information
Home	Score	Away	Date and Time	Venue	Referee	Crowd
Melbourne Storm	30–20	Penrith Panthers	21 April 2007, 5:30 pm	Olympic Park, Melbourne	Steven Clark	9,909
Cronulla Sharks	26–0	Canberra Raiders	21 April 2007, 7:30 pm	Toyota Park	Jason Robinson	9,844
Manly Warringah Sea Eagles	20–6	Gold Coast Titans	22 April 2007, 2:00 pm	Brookvale Oval	Tony Archer	16,887
Parramatta Eels	18–21	Bulldogs	22 April 2007, 3:00 pm	Parramatta Stadium	Sean Hampstead	18,285
Newcastle Knights	16–20	Brisbane Broncos	22 April 2007, 7:00 pm	EnergyAustralia Stadium	Shayne Hayne	25,524
North Queensland Cowboys	6–10	South Sydney Rabbitohs	23 April 2007, 7:00 pm	Dairy Farmers Stadium	Ben Cummins	17,678
St George Illawarra Dragons	BYE	Sydney Roosters
Wests Tigers	BYE	New Zealand Warriors

== Round 7 ==
- After their worst start to a season since 1994 the Sydney Roosters became the last team to win a game in the 2007 season, beating the St George Illawarra Dragons on the traditional ANZAC day match on Wednesday. It was the 1,000th win in the club's history, the first club to achieve the milestone.
- In a re-match between the two teams of the 2006 grand final, the Melbourne Storm defeated the Brisbane Broncos, leaving the Storm as the only remaining undefeated team in 2007.
- Two South Sydney players reached significant career milestones: David Peachey played his 250th first grade game, and captain Peter Cusack played his 150th game.
- Daniel Wagon played his 200th game for the Parramatta Eels.

Home	Score	Away	Match Information
Home	Score	Away	Date and Time	Venue	Referee	Crowd
Sydney Roosters	18–4	St George Illawarra Dragons	25 April 2007, 7:30 pm	Sydney Football Stadium	Paul Simpkins	18,240
Brisbane Broncos	18–28	Melbourne Storm	27 April 2007, 7:30 pm	Suncorp Stadium	Sean Hampstead	33,750
Bulldogs	18–34	Wests Tigers	27 April 2007, 7:30 pm	Telstra Stadium	Shayne Hayne	18,066
Penrith Panthers	18–34	Canberra Raiders	28 April 2007, 5:30 pm	CUA Stadium	Gavin Badger	8,494
North Queensland Cowboys	30–26	Manly Warringah Sea Eagles	28 April 2007, 7:30 pm	Dairy Farmers Stadium	Steve Clark	18,682
South Sydney Rabbitohs	16–18	New Zealand Warriors	29 April 2007, 2:00 pm	Telstra Stadium	Jason Robinson	13,044
Gold Coast Titans	38–12	Parramatta Eels	29 April 2007, 3:00 pm	Carrara Stadium	Tony Archer	18,021
Newcastle Knights	20–16	Cronulla Sharks	30 April 2007, 7:00 pm	EnergyAustralia Stadium	Jared Maxwell	15,423

== Round 8 ==
- Melbourne lost its first game of the season, meaning every team had won and lost at least 1 game.

Home	Score	Away	Match Information
Home	Score	Away	Date and Time	Venue	Referee	Crowd
Brisbane Broncos	8–4	South Sydney Rabbitohs	4 May 2007, 7:30 pm	Suncorp Stadium	Paul Simpkins	27,387
St George Illawarra Dragons	28–16	Penrith Panthers	4 May 2007, 7:30 pm	OKI Jubilee Stadium	Sean Hampstead	9,057
New Zealand Warriors	20–22	Cronulla Sharks	5 May 2007, 5:30 pm	Mt Smart Stadium	Gavin Badger	13,587
Wests Tigers	30–12	Melbourne Storm	5 May 2007, 7:30 pm	Bluetongue Central Coast Stadium	Tony Archer	19,111
Parramatta Eels	28–10	Sydney Roosters	5 May 2007, 7:30 pm	Parramatta Stadium	Tony De Las Heras	13,021
Canberra Raiders	30–46	Manly Warringah Sea Eagles	6 May 2007, 2:00 pm	Canberra Stadium	Jared Maxwell	14,387
Bulldogs	30–16	Newcastle Knights	6 May 2007, 3:00 pm	EnergyAustralia Stadium	Steve Clark	12,654
Gold Coast Titans	10–24	North Queensland Cowboys	7 May 2007, 7:00 pm	Carrara Stadium	Ben Cummins	17,806

== Round 9 ==
Home	Score	Away	Match Information
Home	Score	Away	Date and Time	Venue	Referee	Crowd
Manly Warringah Sea Eagles	22–12	Parramatta Eels	11 May 2007, 7:30 pm	Brookvale Oval	Paul Simpkins	19,944
Cronulla Sharks	16–8	Brisbane Broncos	11 May 2007, 7:30 pm	Toyota Park	Shane Hayne	12,262
Newcastle Knights	24–18	New Zealand Warriors	12 May 2007, 5:30 pm	EnergyAustralia Stadium	Tony Archer	15,107
North Queensland Cowboys	12–22	Penrith Panthers	12 May 2007, 7:30 pm	Dairy Farmers Stadium	Jarred Maxwel	17,393
South Sydney Rabbitohs	10–16	Canberra Raiders	12 May 2007, 7:30 pm	Telstra Stadium	Gavin Badger	11,088
Sydney Roosters	24–18	Gold Coast Titans	13 May 2007, 2:00 pm	Sydney Football Stadium	Sean Hampstead	6,242
Wests Tigers	27–8	St George Illawarra Dragons	13 May 2007, 3:00 pm	Telstra Stadium	Ben Cummins	13,625
Melbourne Storm	38–14	Bulldogs	14 May 2007, 7:00 pm	Olympic Park, Melbourne	Steve Clark	14,066

== Round 10 ==
- After losing their first four matches of the season the Wests Tigers defeated the New Zealand Warriors in an unbeaten run of five wins.
- Eels fullback Luke Burt scored a personal tally of 24 points against the Cowboys to notch up his 900th career point, and a record of 500 points at Parramatta Stadium, the first player to reach this milestone.

Home	Score	Away	Match Information
Home	Score	Away	Date and Time	Venue	Referee	Crowd
St George Illawarra Dragons	28–10	Gold Coast Titans	18 May 2007, 7:30 pm	WIN Stadium	Tony Archer	12,085
Parramatta Eels	44–14	North Queensland Cowboys	19 May 2007, 5:30 pm	Parramatta Stadium	Shane Hayne	10,182
Melbourne Storm	26–2	Sydney Roosters	19 May 2007, 7:30 pm	Olympic Park, Melbourne	Gavin Badger	9,354
Bulldogs	20–30	Cronulla Sharks	20 May 2007, 3:00 pm	Telstra Stadium	Ben Cummins	12,834
New Zealand Warriors	26–30	Wests Tigers	20 May 2007, 4:00 pm	Mt Smart Stadium	Steve Clark	10,282
Manly Warringah Sea Eagles	18–6	Brisbane Broncos	21 May 2007, 7:00 pm	Brookvale Oval	Jarred Maxwell	13,493
South Sydney Rabbitohs	BYE	Penrith Panthers
Newcastle Knights	BYE	Canberra Raiders

== Round 11 ==
- The Brisbane Broncos recorded their highest score and largest win in their history, defeating the Newcastle Knights 71–6. This match was Newcastle's biggest loss and set a club record for the most points conceded. Brisbane had been sitting last on the ladder on the day of the match.

Home	Score	Away	Match Information
Home	Score	Away	Date and Time	Venue	Referee	Crowd
Bulldogs	16–26	North Queensland Cowboys	25 May 2007, 7:30 pm	Suncorp Stadium	Tony Archer	15,412
Canberra Raiders	30–6	St George Illawarra Dragons	25 May 2007, 7:30 pm	Canberra Stadium	Steve Clark	13,187
Manly Warringah Sea Eagles	13–12	Melbourne Storm	26 May 2007, 5:30 pm	Brookvale Oval	Shayne Hayne	18,640
Cronulla Sharks	12–13	Sydney Roosters	26 May 2007, 7:30 pm	Toyota Park	Sean Hampstead	11,193
Gold Coast Titans	25–18	South Sydney Rabbitohs	26 May 2007, 7:30 pm	Carrara Stadium	Tony De Las Heras	17,266
Brisbane Broncos	71–6	Newcastle Knights	27 May 2007, 2:00 pm	Suncorp Stadium	Ben Cummins	27,433
Penrith Panthers	24–25	Wests Tigers	27 May 2007, 3:00 pm	CUA Stadium	Jarred Maxwell	17,337
Parramatta Eels	30–6	New Zealand Warriors	28 May 2007, 7:00 pm	Parramatta Stadium	Paul Simpkins	11,160

== Round 12 ==
- Penrith and St George Illawarra recorded upset wins over competition leaders Manly and defending premiers Brisbane respectively.
- Warriors winger Michael Crockett was dismissed after just four minutes in the home team's 40–20 loss to the Bulldogs for a high tackle.
- Wests Tigers five-game winning streak was brought to an end, when they lost to the Parramatta Eels 8–38.
- Wests Tigers fullback Brett Hodgson suffered a fractured eye socket after a headclash with Parramatta Eels utility PJ Marsh, which saw him miss two months of football.

Home	Score	Away	Match Information
Home	Score	Away	Date and Time	Venue	Referee	Crowd
St George Illawarra Dragons	11–4	Brisbane Broncos	1 June 2007, 7:30 pm	Oki Jubilee Stadium	Shayne Hayne	10,302
Penrith Panthers	22–16	Manly Warringah Sea Eagles	1 June 2007, 7:30 pm	CUA Stadium	Steve Clark	11,325
Sydney Roosters	18–22	Newcastle Knights	2 June 2007, 5:30 pm	Bluetongue Central Coast Stadium	Tony De Las Heras	11,264
Melbourne Storm	26–10	South Sydney Rabbitohs	2 June 2007, 7:30 pm	Olympic Park, Melbourne	Jarred Maxwell	11,211
North Queensland Cowboys	26–24	Cronulla Sharks	2 June 2007, 7:30 pm	Dairy Farmers Stadium	Paul Simpkins	20,075
Gold Coast Titans	28–8	Canberra Raiders	3 June 2007, 2:00 pm	Carrara Stadium	Gavin Badger	13,644
New Zealand Warriors	20–40	Bulldogs	3 June 2007, 4:00 pm Local	Mt Smart Stadium	Sean Hampstead	10,041
Wests Tigers	8–38	Parramatta Eels	4 June 2007, 7:00 pm	Telstra Stadium	Ben Cummins	22,245

== Round 13 ==
- Heavy storms across areas of New South Wales affected games and attendances throughout the round. The Friday night match at Telstra Stadium was played in a constant, heavy shower of rain. The match played in Newcastle was under threat of cancellation for much of Sunday morning after 300mm of rain had fallen in the area within four days. Many lower grade NSWRL matches were postponed to preserve grounds for first grade matches.
- The Canberra Raiders scored four tries in the opening 12 minutes on their way to a 38–10 win over the Parramatta Eels.
- The last-placed Sydney Roosters achieved their highest score since 1935 in their 64–30 win over the North Queensland Cowboys.
- In the New Zealand Warriors' 300th game, the Warriors suffered their sixth straight loss, losing 4–2 against competition leaders the Melbourne Storm. The scoreline was 2–0 to New Zealand until the 72nd minute, when a decisive try sealed the match for Melbourne. It was the lowest aggregate score (six points total) since 1993.

Home	Score	Away	Match Information
Home	Score	Away	Date and Time	Venue	Referee	Crowd
South Sydney Rabbitohs	14–4	Penrith Panthers	8 June 2007, 7:30 pm	Telstra Stadium	Paul Simpkins	5,033
Canberra Raiders	38–10	Parramatta Eels	9 June 2007, 5:30 pm	Canberra Stadium	Jared Maxwell	11,232
Sydney Roosters	64–30	North Queensland Cowboys	9 June 2007, 7:30 pm	Sydney Football Stadium	Gavin Badger	4,186
Newcastle Knights	14–33	Wests Tigers	10 June 2007, 3:00 pm	Energy Australia Stadium	Sean Hampstead	13,609
New Zealand Warriors	2–4	Melbourne Storm	10 June 2007, 4:00 pm	Mt Smart Stadium	Ben Cummins	6,209
St George Illawarra Dragons	16–20	Cronulla Sharks	11 June 2007, 7:30 pm	Oki Jubilee Stadium	Tony Archer	12,455
Brisbane Broncos	BYE	Bulldogs
Manly Warringah Sea Eagles	BYE	Gold Coast Titans

== Round 14 ==
- The New Zealand Warriors won their first match since round seven, ending a six-game losing run by beating the Cronulla Sharks 2–12 on a rainy night at Toyota Park.
- Danny Buderus played his 200th game for the Newcastle Knights.
- Parramatta second rower Nathan Hindmarsh played his 200th first grade game for the Parramatta Eels and was given a guard of honour at the end of the match.
- Melbourne Storm veteran winger Matt Geyer scored his 100th career try.

Home	Score	Away	Match Information
Home	Score	Away	Date and Time	Venue	Referee	Crowd
Bulldogs	12–19	Brisbane Broncos	15 June 2007, 7:30 pm	Telstra Stadium	Paul Simpkins	10,121
Manly Warringah Sea Eagles	14–2	South Sydney Rabbitohs	15 June 2007, 7:30 pm	Brookvale Oval	Steve Clark	7,341
Cronulla Sharks	2–12	New Zealand Warriors	16 June 2007, 5:30 pm	Toyota Park	Gavin Badger	4,202
Penrith Panthers	20–24	Sydney Roosters	16 June 2007, 7:30 pm	CUA Stadium	Ben Cummins	5,831
North Queensland Cowboys	12–58	Melbourne Storm	16 June 2007, 7:30 pm	Dairy Farmers Stadium	Jarred Maxwell	20,023
Parramatta Eels	20–12	St George Illawarra Dragons	17 June 2007, 2:00 pm	Parramatta Stadium	Sean Hampstead	12,658
Wests Tigers	14–16	Gold Coast Titans	17 June 2007, 3:00 pm	Campbelltown Stadium	Tony Archer	13,451
Newcastle Knights	22–18	Canberra Raiders	18 June 2007, 7:00 pm	Energy Australia Stadium	Shayne Hayne	11,349

== Round 15 ==
- Manly lost its first match at home after a 10-match winning streak.
- The Melbourne Storm celebrated its 10-year anniversary with a 28–6 victory over the Dragons. The Storm's weekend long celebrations started with the naming of its team of the decade.

Home	Score	Away	Match Information
Home	Score	Away	Date and Time	Venue	Referee	Crowd
Manly Warringah Sea Eagles	8–27	Bulldogs	22 June 2007, 7:30 pm	Brookvale Oval	Tony Archer	13,849
New Zealand Warriors	54–14	Penrith Panthers	22 June 2007, 8:00 pm	Mt Smart Stadium	Steve Clark	9,978
Canberra Raiders	24–28	North Queensland Cowboys	23 June 2007, 5:30 pm	Canberra Stadium	Tony De Las Heras	11,263
Sydney Roosters	16–36	Parramatta Eels	23 June 2007, 7:30 pm	Sydney Football Stadium	Gavin Badger	12,211
Gold Coast Titans	28–22	Newcastle Knights	23 June 2007, 7:30 pm	Carrara Stadium	Ben Cummins	15,306
South Sydney Rabbitohs	16–12	Cronulla Sharks	24 June 2007, 2:00 pm	Telstra Stadium	Sean Hampstead	9,568
Melbourne Storm	28–6	St George Illawarra Dragons	24 June 2007, 3:00 pm	Olympic Park, Melbourne	Paul Simpkins	13,545
Brisbane Broncos	48–18	Wests Tigers	25 June 2007, 7:00 pm	Suncorp Stadium	Shayne Hayne	29,364

== Round 16 ==
- South Sydney defeated Newcastle at Energy Australia Stadium. It was Souths' first win at this venue since 1994.

Home	Score	Away	Match Information
Home	Score	Away	Date and Time	Venue	Referee	Crowd
Newcastle Knights	25–28	South Sydney Rabbitohs	29 June 2007, 7:30 pm	Energy Australia Stadium	Sean Hampstead	16,320
Gold Coast Titans	6–22	New Zealand Warriors	30 June 2007, 5:30 pm	Carrara Stadium	Shayne Hayne	17,608
Penrith Panthers	16–24	Brisbane Broncos	30 June 2007, 7:30 pm	CUA Stadium	Gavin Badger	8,533
Canberra Raiders	16–22	Wests Tigers	1 July 2007, 2:00 pm	Canberra Stadium	Steve Clark	12,598
St George Illawarra Dragons	26–22	Manly Warringah Sea Eagles	1 July 2007, 3:00 pm	Oki Jubilee Stadium	Tony Archer	11,958
Bulldogs	38–6	Sydney Roosters	2 July 2007, 7:00 pm	Telstra Stadium	Jared Maxwell	20,722
North Queensland Cowboys	BYE	Parramatta Eels
Cronulla Sharks	BYE	Melbourne Storm

== Round 17 ==
- Following Round 17, Aussie Stadium's naming rights deal expired, with the name reverting to the Sydney Football Stadium on 8 July.
- On 9 July Sydney Roosters coach Chris Anderson resigned from the club, handing the role to former club great Brad Fittler.

Home	Score	Away	Match Information
Home	Score	Away	Date and Time	Venue	Referee	Crowd
Brisbane Broncos	19–18	Gold Coast Titans	6 July 2007, 7:30 pm	Suncorp Stadium	Steve Clark	48,621
Wests Tigers	43–26	Penrith Panthers	6 July 2007, 7:30 pm	Telstra Stadium	Ben Cummins	12,395
South Sydney Rabbitohs	8–12	Melbourne Storm	7 July 2007, 5:30 pm	Bluetongue Central Coast Stadium	Jared Maxwell	14,328
North Queensland Cowboys	18–12	New Zealand Warriors	7 July 2007, 7:30 pm	Dairy Farmers Stadium	Tony Archer	19,694
Manly Warringah Sea Eagles	56–0	Sydney Roosters	7 July 2007, 7:30 pm	Brookvale Oval	Gavin Badger	9,932
St George Illawarra Dragons	58–16	Canberra Raiders	8 July 2007, 2:00 pm	WIN Stadium	Sean Hampstead	7,561
Cronulla Sharks	12–14	Bulldogs	8 July 2007, 3:00 pm	Toyota Park	Shayne Hayne	8,441
Parramatta Eels	10–34	Newcastle Knights	9 July 2007, 7:00 pm	Parramatta Stadium	Paul Simpkins	10,363

== Round 18 ==
- Brisbane Broncos five-eighth Darren Lockyer suffered a knee injury, requiring a reconstruction which saw him miss nine months. Bulldogs forward Willie Mason also suffered a season ending wrist injury.
- The Gold Coast Titans suffered their worst ever loss, going down to Canberra 56–10.
- There was an argument between Parramatta coach Michael Hagan and South Sydney coach Jason Taylor after their teams' match. It is alleged Taylor said "Brian Smith (former Eels coach) fixed up what Hagan at Newcastle." Taylor also said that Hagan had ruined what had been put in place at the Eels.

Home	Score	Away	Match Information
Home	Score	Away	Date and Time	Venue	Referee	Crowd
North Queensland Cowboys	16–24	Brisbane Broncos	13 July 2007, 7:30 pm	Dairy Farmers Stadium	Sean Hampstead	25,926
Manly Warringah Sea Eagles	34–4	Wests Tigers	13 July 2007, 7:30 pm	Brookvale Oval	Steve Clark	15,288
Bulldogs	20–30	Penrith Panthers	14 July 2007, 5:30 pm	Telstra Stadium	Tony De Las Heras	12,465
Sydney Roosters	23–12	Cronulla Sharks	14 July 2007, 7:30 pm	Sydney Football Stadium	Ben Cummins	8,421
New Zealand Warriors	44–16	St George Illawarra Dragons	15 July 2007, 12:00 pm	Mt Smart Stadium	Jared Maxwell	10,037
Canberra Raiders	56–10	Gold Coast Titans	15 July 2007, 2:00 pm	Canberra Stadium	Paul Simpkins	9,136
Parramatta Eels	18–12	South Sydney Rabbitohs	15 July 2007, 3:00 pm	Parramatta Stadium	Tony Archer	15,202
Melbourne Storm	44–0	Newcastle Knights	16 July 2007, 7:00 pm	Olympic Park Stadium	Gavin Badger	10,223

== Round 19 ==
Home	Score	Away	Match Information
Home	Score	Away	Date and Time	Venue	Referee	Crowd
Cronulla Sharks	22–29	Manly Warringah Sea Eagles	20 July 2007, 7:30 pm	Toyota Park	Shayne Hayne	6,494
Gold Coast Titans	12–36	Bulldogs	20 July 2007, 7:30 pm	Carrara Stadium	Sean Hampstead	15,873
Melbourne Storm	34–6	Canberra Raiders	21 July 2007, 7:30 pm	Olympic Park Stadium	Jared Maxwell	8,983
Newcastle Knights	17–20	Sydney Roosters	21 July 2007, 7:30 pm	EnergyAustralia Stadium	Tony Archer	15,171
Penrith Panthers	20–38	St George Illawarra Dragons	21 July 2007, 5:30 pm	CUA Stadium	Gavin Badger	9,523
South Sydney Rabbitohs	20–14	North Queensland Cowboys	22 July 2007, 3:00 pm	Telstra Stadium	Steve Clark	10,022
Wests Tigers	16–28	New Zealand Warriors	22 July 2007, 2:00 pm	Campbelltown Stadium	Paul Simpkins	14,012
Brisbane Broncos	16–20	Parramatta Eels	23 July 2007, 7:00 pm	Suncorp Stadium	Ben Cummins	25,702

== Round 20 ==
Home	Score	Away	Match Information
Home	Score	Away	Date and Time	Venue	Referee	Crowd
Canberra Raiders	34–30	Penrith Panthers	27 July 2007, 7:30 pm	Canberra Stadium	Paul Simpkins	8,240
Sydney Roosters	26–16	Melbourne Storm	27 July 2007, 7:30 pm	Sydney Football Stadium	Sean Hampstead	8,824
New Zealand Warriors	52–10	Newcastle Knights	28 July 2007, 5:30 pm	Mt Smart Stadium	Jared Maxwell	11,301
St George Illawarra Dragons	24–28	Bulldogs	28 July 2007, 7:30 pm	WIN Stadium	Ben Cummins	19,105
South Sydney Rabbitohs	20–14	Gold Coast Titans	28 July 2007, 7:30 pm	Telstra Stadium	Gavin Badger	13,351
Brisbane Broncos	30–16	Cronulla Sharks	29 July 2007, 2:00 pm	Suncorp Stadium	Steve Clark	24,563
Parramatta Eels	24–32	Manly Warringah Sea Eagles	29 July 2007, 3:00 pm	Parramatta Stadium	Tony Archer	20,113
Wests Tigers	54–10	North Queensland Cowboys	30 July 2007, 7:00 pm	Leichhardt Oval	Shayne Hayne	17,101

== Round 21 ==
- The Bulldogs' Brad Morrin was cited for biting Parramatta's Timana Tahu. He was suspended for eight weeks for the incident.

Home	Score	Away	Match Information
Home	Score	Away	Date and Time	Venue	Referee	Crowd
Bulldogs	22–34	Parramatta Eels	3 August 2007, 7:30 pm	Telstra Stadium	Sean Hampstead	27,201
Newcastle Knights	4–20	St George Illawarra Dragons	3 August 2007, 7:30 pm	EnergyAustralia Stadium	Jared Maxwell	12,573
Gold Coast Titans	30–14	Wests Tigers	4 August 2007, 5:30 pm	Carrara Stadium	Steve Clark	17,257
North Queensland Cowboys	28–22	Canberra Raiders	4 August 2007, 7:30 pm	Dairy Farmers Stadium	Tony Archer	15,791
Penrith Panthers	32–16	South Sydney Rabbitohs	4 August 2007, 7:30 pm	CUA Stadium	Gavin Badger	10,845
Sydney Roosters	31–31	New Zealand Warriors	5 August 2007, 2:00 pm	Sydney Football Stadium	Shayne Hayne	15,124
Brisbane Broncos	8–21	Manly Warringah Sea Eagles	5 August 2007, 3:00 pm	Suncorp Stadium	Ben Cummins	35,784
Cronulla Sharks	16–17	Melbourne Storm	6 August 2007, 7:00 pm	Toyota Park	Paul Simpkins	7,831

== Round 22 ==
- Cronulla Sharks coach Ricky Stuart allegedly punched a hole into the wall of the Parramatta Stadium coaches box, in spite of a win over the Eels 25–24.
- Bulldogs forward Sonny Bill Williams scored three tries in his team's win against Canberra Raiders.

Home	Score	Away	Match Information
Home	Score	Away	Date and Time	Venue	Referee	Crowd
Manly Warringah Sea Eagles	50–16	Newcastle Knights	10 August 2007, 7:30 pm	Bluetongue Central Coast Stadium	Shayne Hayne	17,122
Wests Tigers	22–26	Sydney Roosters	10 August 2007, 7:30 pm	Telstra Stadium	Tony Archer	25,166
New Zealand Warriors	30–6	Gold Coast Titans	11 August 2007, 5:30 pm	Mt Smart Stadium	Ben Cummins	20,609
St George Illawarra Dragons	14–24	South Sydney Rabbitohs	11 August 2007, 7:30 pm	WIN Stadium	Steve Clark	18,382
Parramatta Eels	24–25	Cronulla Sharks	11 August 2007, 7:30 pm	Parramatta Stadium	Jason Robinson	13,376
Bulldogs	52–4	Canberra Raiders	12 August 2007, 2:00 pm	Telstra Stadium	Paul Simpkins	12,127
Melbourne Storm	14–6	Brisbane Broncos	12 August 2007, 3:00 pm	Olympic Park Stadium	Sean Hampstead	13,508
Penrith Panthers	26–30	North Queensland Cowboys	13 August 2007, 7:00 pm	CUA Stadium	Jared Maxwell	7,618

== Round 23 ==
- The Sydney Roosters suffered their first defeat under caretaker coach Brad Fittler.

Home	Score	Away	Match Information
Home	Score	Away	Date and Time	Venue	Referee	Crowd
Brisbane Broncos	24–25	Bulldogs	17 August 2007, 7:30 pm	Suncorp Stadium	Steve Clark	35,199
Melbourne Storm	14–10	Parramatta Eels	17 August 2007, 7:30 pm	Olympic Park Stadium	Tony Archer	11,549
Cronulla Sharks	28–29	Wests Tigers	18 August 2007, 5:30 pm	Toyota Park	Paul Simpkins	12,964
North Queensland Cowboys	24–14	St George Illawarra Dragons	18 August 2007, 7:30 pm	Dairy Farmers Stadium	Ben Cummins	18,321
Canberra Raiders	26–24	New Zealand Warriors	18 August 2007, 7:30 pm	Canberra Stadium	Jared Maxwell	8,134
Gold Coast Titans	22–18	Sydney Roosters	19 August 2007, 2:00 pm	Carrara Stadium	Gavin Badger	17,423
Newcastle Knights	12–46	Penrith Panthers	19 August 2007, 3:00 pm	EnergyAustralia Stadium	Jason Robinson	14,351
South Sydney Rabbitohs	24–18	Manly Warringah Sea Eagles	20 August 2007, 7:00 pm	Telstra Stadium	Sean Hampstead	12,087

== Round 24 ==
- This round was the first instance in the 100 years of the competition where two separate matches were sold out. For the first time in its history, Mt Smart Stadium held a sold-out game, and Leichhardt Oval was also sold out.
- The Melbourne Storm captured the Minor Premiership for the second consecutive season (although the title was later stripped).
- The Warriors made the Finals Series for the first time since 2003.

Home	Score	Away	Match Information
Home	Score	Away	Date and Time	Venue	Referee	Crowd
Bulldogs	6–38	Melbourne Storm	24 August 2007, 7:30 pm	Telstra Stadium	Ben Cummins	21,756
Newcastle Knights	18–34	North Queensland Cowboys	24 August 2007, 7:30 pm	EnergyAustralia Stadium	Jared Maxwell	12,264
Cronulla Sharks	28–12	Gold Coast Titans	25 August 2007, 5:30 pm	Toyota Park	Jason Robinson	9,036
Sydney Roosters	22–28	Penrith Panthers	25 August 2007, 7:30 pm	Sydney Football Stadium	Steve Clark	11,326
New Zealand Warriors	36–14	Manly Warringah Sea Eagles	26 August 2007, 12:00 pm	Mt Smart Stadium	Paul Simpkins	25,572
Brisbane Broncos	30–19	Canberra Raiders	26 August 2007, 2:00 pm	Suncorp Stadium	Shayne Hayne	31,614
Wests Tigers	12–37	South Sydney Rabbitohs	26 August 2007, 3:00 pm	Leichhardt Oval	Tony Archer	20,232
St George Illawarra Dragons	14–6	Parramatta Eels	27 August 2007, 7:00 pm	WIN Stadium	Sean Hampstead	13,488

== Round 25 ==
- The NRL scrapped Monday Night Football and moved the Melbourne Storm vs Gold Coast Titans match to the Sunday night before, to ensure that the teams would not have a short turnaround before a finals match.
- The Newcastle Knights win against the Wests Tigers saw the Knights move out of last place, giving Penrith the wooden spoon; and, it saw the Brisbane Broncos replace the Wests Tigers in the final eight.
- The South Sydney Rabbitohs clinched a finals appearance for the first time since 1989.
- The Brisbane Broncos conceded 68 points against Parramatta, the most in club history.

Home	Score	Away	Match Information
Home	Score	Away	Date and Time	Venue	Referee	Crowd
North Queensland Cowboys	38–32	Bulldogs	31 August 2007, 7:30 pm	Dairy Farmers Stadium	Shayne Hayne	24,050
Wests Tigers	24–26	Newcastle Knights	31 August 2007, 7:30 pm	Telstra Stadium	Paul Simpkins	13,446
South Sydney Rabbitohs	12–26	Sydney Roosters	1 September 2007, 5:30 pm	Telstra Stadium	Ben Cummins	32,126
Penrith Panthers	20–24	New Zealand Warriors	1 September 2007, 7:30 pm	CUA Stadium	Sean Hampstead	14,473
Canberra Raiders	12–22	Cronulla Sharks	1 September 2007, 7:30 pm	Canberra Stadium	Bernard Sutton	11,440
Manly Warringah Sea Eagles	28–24	St George Illawarra Dragons	2 September 2007, 2:00 pm	Brookvale Oval	Steve Clark	18,637
Parramatta Eels	68–22	Brisbane Broncos	2 September 2007, 3:00 pm	Parramatta Stadium	Tony Archer	17,112
Melbourne Storm	50–6	Gold Coast Titans	2 September 2007, 7:00 pm	Olympic Park Stadium	Jared Maxwell	11,770

== Finals series ==
- The 2007 Finals Series was based on the McIntyre format. For the first time, teams based outside of Sydney were permitted to host finals matches in weeks two and three in their own cities; previously, all matches after the first week were played at either the SFS or Telstra Stadium. The 2007 Grand Final was played at Telstra Stadium.
- All rounds in the finals series were shown live in Australia on Channel 9, with the exception of the Warriors v Parramatta qualifying final in week one, which was shown as a delayed telecast due to the time difference between New Zealand and eastern Australia.

=== Week One ===
==== First Qualifying Final ====
Team	1st Half	2nd Half	Total
(4) New Zealand Warriors	0	10	10
(5) Parramatta Eels	0	12	12

Date	Friday, 7 September 2007 7:30 pm AEST
Tries (New Zealand Warriors)	1: T. Byrne, M. Witt (Penalty)
Tries (Parramatta Eels)	1: F. Mateo, J. Hayne
Goals (New Zealand Warriors)	1 from 2: M. Witt
Goals (Parramatta Eels)	2 from 2: K. Inu
Field Goals (New Zealand Warriors)	None
Field Goals (Parramatta Eels)	None
Venue	Mt. Smart, Auckland, NZ
Attendance	28,745
Referee	Tony Archer

==== Second Qualifying Final ====
Team	1st Half	2nd Half	Total
(3) North Queensland Cowboys	14	6	20
(6) Canterbury Bulldogs	14	4	18

Date	Saturday, 8 September 2007 5:30 pm AEST
Tries (North Queensland Cowboys)	2: J. Thurston; 1: P. Bowman
Tries (Canterbury Bulldogs)	1: D. Millard, W. Tonga, L. Patten
Goals (North Queensland Cowboys)	4 from 4: J. Thurston
Goals (Canterbury Bulldogs)	3 from 4: H. El Masri
Field Goals (North Queensland Cowboys)	None
Field Goals (Canterbury Bulldogs)	None
Venue	Dairy Farmers Stadium, Townsville, QLD
Attendance	24,004
Referee	Paul Simpkins

==== Third Qualifying Final ====
Team	1st Half	2nd Half	Total
(2) Manly Warringah Sea Eagles	6	24	30
(7) South Sydney Rabbitohs	2	4	6

Date	Saturday, 8 September 2007 7:30 pm AEST
Tries (Manly Warringah Sea Eagles)	2: S. Menzies, B. Stewart; 1: A. Watmough
Tries (South Sydney Rabbitohs)	1: P. Mellor
Goals (Manly Warringah Sea Eagles)	5 from 5: M. Orford
Goals (South Sydney Rabbitohs)	1 from 2: J. Williams
Field Goals (Manly Warringah Sea Eagles)	None
Field Goals (South Sydney Rabbitohs)	None
Venue	Brookvale Oval, Sydney, NSW
Attendance	19,785
Referee	Shayne Hayne

==== Fourth Qualifying Final ====
Team	1st Half	2nd Half	Total
(1) Melbourne Storm	28	12	40
(8) Brisbane Broncos	0	0	0

Date	Sunday, 9 September 2007 4:00 pmAEST
Tries (Melbourne Storm)	3: S. Turner; 1: A. Quinn, C. Smith, M.Geyer, M. King
Tries (Brisbane Broncos)	None
Goals (Melbourne Storm)	3 from 7: C. Smith
Goals (Brisbane Broncos)	None
Field Goals (Melbourne Storm)	None
Field Goals (Brisbane Broncos)	None
Venue	Olympic Park, Melbourne, VIC
Attendance	15,522
Referee	Steven Clark

=== Week Two ===
==== First Semi-Final ====
Team	1st Half	2nd Half	Total
(5) Parramatta Eels	12	13	25
(6) Canterbury Bulldogs	6	0	6

Date	Saturday, 15 September 2007 7:30 pm AEST
Tries (Parramatta Eels)	1: M. Riddell, E. Grothe, T. Tahu, J. Hayne
Tries (Canterbury Bulldogs)	1: M. Utai
Goals (Parramatta Eels)	4 from 4: K. Inu
Goals (Canterbury Bulldogs)	1 from 1: H. El Masri
Field Goals (Parramatta Eels)	1: B. Finch
Field Goals (Canterbury Bulldogs)	None
Venue	ANZ Stadium, Sydney, NSW
Attendance	50,621
Referee	Shayne Hayne

==== Second Semi-Final ====
Team	1st Half	2nd Half	Total
(3) North Queensland Cowboys	18	31	49
(4) New Zealand Warriors	12	0	12

Date	Sunday, 16 September 2007 4:00 pmAEST
Tries (North Queensland Cowboys)	2: B. Farrar; 1: M. Henry, T. Williams, A. Graham, M. Bowen, J. Smith, R. Cashmere
Tries (New Zealand Warriors)	1: M. Crockett, T. Martin
Goals (North Queensland Cowboys)	7 from 7: J. Thurston; P. Bowman 1/1
Goals (New Zealand Warriors)	2 from 2: M. Witt
Field Goals (North Queensland Cowboys)	1: M. Bowen
Field Goals (Canterbury Bulldogs)	None
Venue	Dairy Farmers Stadium, Townsville, QLD
Attendance	21,847
Referee	Tony Archer

=== Week Three ===
==== First Preliminary Final ====
Team	1st Half	2nd Half	Total
(2) Manly Warringah Sea Eagles	6	22	28
(3) North Queensland Cowboys	6	0	6

Date	Saturday, 22 September 2007 7:30 pm AEST
Tries (Manly Warringah Sea Eagles)	1: B. Stewart, A. Watmough, S. Bell, L. Williamson
Tries (North Queensland Cowboys)	1: J. Lillyman
Goals (Manly Warringah Sea Eagles)	4 from 7: M. Orford
Goals (North Queensland Cowboys)	1 from 1: J. Thurston
Field Goals (Manly Warringah Sea Eagles)	None
Field Goals (North Queensland Cowboys)	None
Venue	Sydney Football Stadium, Sydney, NSW
Attendance	32,611
Referee	Paul Simpkins

==== Second Preliminary Final ====
Team	1st Half	2nd Half	Total
(1) Melbourne Storm	10	16	26
(5) Parramatta Eels	4	6	10

Date	Sunday, 23 September 2007 4:00 pmAEST
Tries (Melbourne Storm)	2: M. King; 1: S. Turner, C. Cronk
Tries (Parramatta Eels)	1: E. Grothe, J. Reddy
Goals (Melbourne Storm)	5 from 6: C. Smith
Goals (Parramatta Eels)	1 from 2: K. Inu
Field Goals (Melbourne Storm)	None
Field Goals (Parramatta Eels)	None
Venue	Telstra Dome, Melbourne, VIC
Attendance	33,427
Referee	Steven Clark

=== Grand Final ===
2007 NRL Grand Final

Sunday, 30 September
19:15 AEST (UTC+10)

Melbourne Storm	34 – 8	Manly Warringah Sea Eagles
Tries: 7 Quinn 12', 76'; Inglis 23', 55'; Crocker 44'; King 52'; Newton 72'; Goals: 3 C Smith 13', 74', 76' (3/8)	1st: 10–4; 2nd: 24–4; Report	Tries: 2 Matai 39'; Hicks 62'; Goals: Orford (0/2)

ANZStadium, Sydney
Attendance: 81,392
Referee: Tony Archer
Touch judges: Steve Chiddy, Russell Turner
Clive Churchill Medal: Greg Inglis (Melbourne)

== See also ==
- 2007 in rugby league
