= Mushaira =

Poetic symposium in the Indian subcontinent

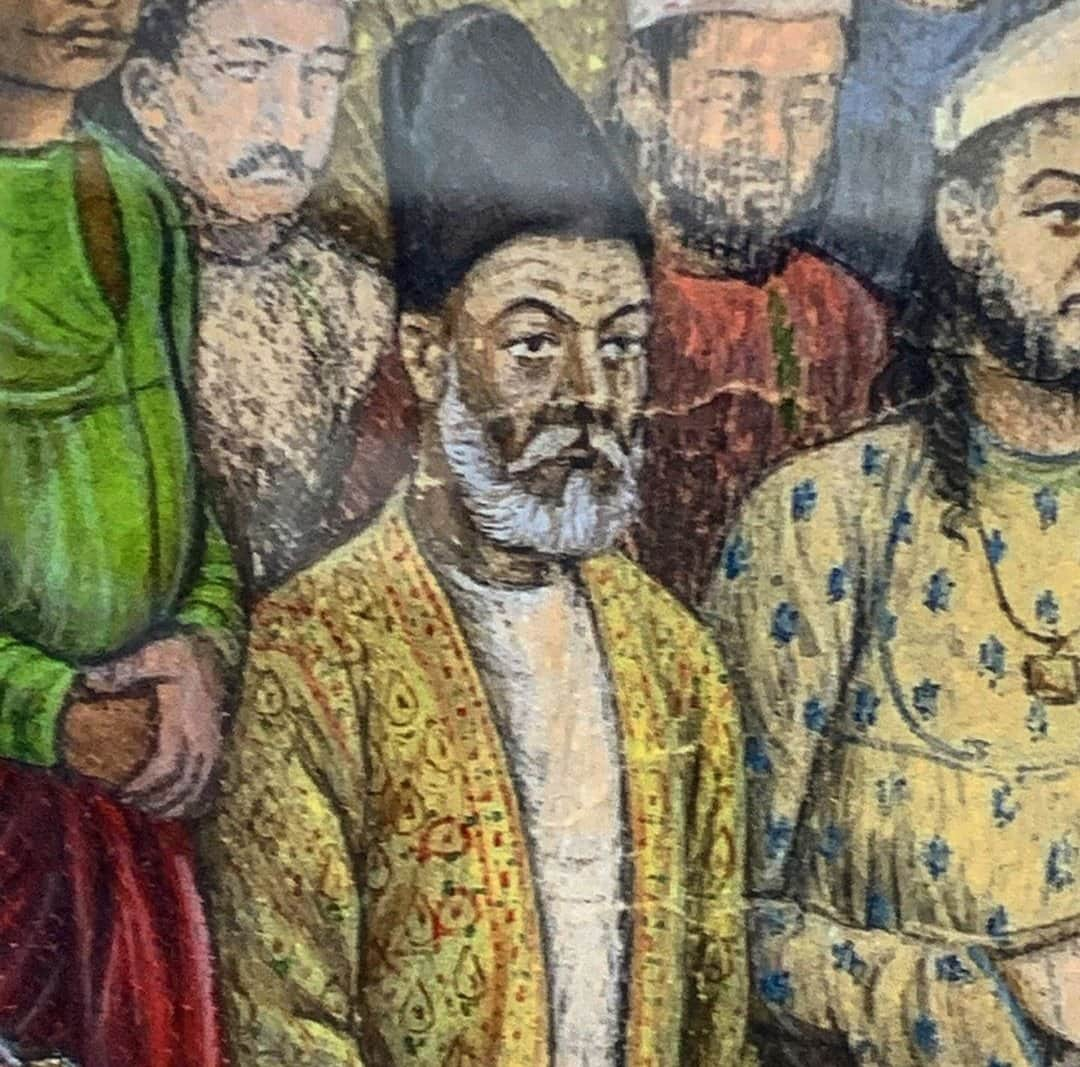
Depiction of Ghalib at a Mushaira

Mushaira (Urdu: مشاعرہ, romanized: mušā'ira) is a traditional Urdu poetry gathering in which poets publicly recite their work, often engaging in forms of improvisation and competitive performance. Mushairas, also known as mehfil or mushairi, have been a defining institution of Urdu literary culture in North India, Pakistan, and the Deccan, particularly among Hyderabadi Muslims. It is often regarded as a forum for free self-expression.

== Etymology ==
According to Oxford English Dictionary, the Urdu word was borrowed from Arabic mušāʿara, meaning “vying poetry”.

Some legends suggest that mushaʿira was first organized by Amir Khusrau (1253–1325), while some legends reject this hypothesis and claim he introduced qawwali, not mushaʿira.

According to some other legends, mushaira originated in the 14th century in the Deccan Plateau during the Bahmani Sultanate, and was introduced in North India by Wali Mohammed Wali in 1700, where, upon his arrival, he recited a collection of his poems in the vernacular Deccani language in front of a large public gathering. Until then in Delhi there were no poetic public gatherings for locals, whereas poetic gatherings use to commence in elite courts in which participating poets use to recite their poems only in New Persian.

== History ==
=== History of initiatives ===
Urdu poetry took the final decisive position in the 17th century when Mughals had established their dominion. It was thought by the legends of early India that shairy should be recited in a gathering of minds with sufficient understanding of the language, so that they may enjoy, criticise, and ultimately appreciate what was recited. The gathering, though, would be in the presence of the King and his ministers, but then the talk was about somewhat a big gathering than of that. They prophesied that this would lead to development of Urdu shairy, as people will be able to get the ideas of practical poetry in accordance with the demand of public interests and of public betterment.

=== History of development ===
The most common form of poetry recital was the mushaira, or poetic symposium, where poets would gather to read their compositions crafted in accordance to a strict metrical pattern, agreed upon beforehand, even while meeting a certain loftiness of thought. The real initiative was legendary that took in the 18th century in the Mughal court helping Urdu mushaira reach its final, decisive form. A culture was built around taking lessons in poetry writing; it even became fashionable for royalty to learn Urdu shairi. Bahadur Shah Zafar, the last Mughal Emperor of India, was an accomplished poet in his own right. He had a habit of setting his court difficult poetic tasks, such as the challenging art of tazmin, which led to the development of Tarahi mushaira.

== Forms ==
A mushaira can take a number of forms. Traditionally, the ghazal is the specific poetic form employed, neither recited nor sung, but other forms of poetry, recitation and song may be allowed also. If the poetry is humorous in nature, it is referred to as mazahiya mushaira. Mazahiya mushaira is very popular these days, people enjoying the recitation with great pleasure. Some of the poets now developed it in the form of criticising, so presently it's also being used to comment in a very slight way giving a deeper meaning which gives a long period realisation for the potential comments understanding.

These days invited guest poets will usually be seated behind a long table at the front of the room, with often the most admired of them seated in the centre. One person will host the mushaira, inviting each poet to come and perform. However, the form is relatively free, and anyone can come forward and ask to perform. The host usually lets the most admired poet present be the last to perform. Traditionally, a burning candle used to be passed from one end of the line to the other indicating whose turn it is to present.

The audience often interacts with the poets, most often with encouraging calls of wah wah at the end of appreciated couplets. If a couplet is particularly appreciated, there may be calls for the poet to repeat it, or the audience might spontaneously repeat it themselves. The latter is done when a poet's first couplet is appreciated. Recently, the combination of traditional mushaira with Hindi kavi sammelan has given it a big thrust. Now, such "mushaira-kavi sammelan" are being organised across the globe.

== Tarahi mushaira ==
Sometimes a mushaira is more competitive.The Tarahi mushaira is a particular form where a misra' is given, and poets compose their ghazals using the behar (rhythmic meter) of that misra'. According to a contemporary Urdu poet Waseem Khan Seem, and Muhammad Shakeel Khan, however, the usual and traditional way of writing Urdu poetry in the most natural way for any authentic poet is to write poetry on the basis of Aamad (germination of poetic thoughts in poet's mind) instead of just following Tarhai misra' .
