= Samer El Masri =

Australian rugby league footballer

Personal information
- Born: Sydney, Australia

Playing information
- Position: Wing
Representative
Years	Team	Pld	T	G	FG	P
2000–06	Lebanon	9	3	27	0	66
- Source: As of 7 February 2021
- Relatives: Hazem El Masri (brother)

Samer El Masri is an Australian former rugby league footballer who represented Lebanon at the 2000 Rugby League World Cup.

== Background ==
El Masri was born in Sydney, New South Wales, Australia.

He is the brother of Australian and Lebanon international, Hazem El Masri.

== Playing career ==
Samer was born in Australia to ethnic Lebanese parents, Khaled and Amal. El Masri first played for Lebanon at the 2000 World Cup, where he played in all three of his countries matches. He later played for his country in 2002, 2003 and in World Cup qualifying matches in 2006.
