= Misr =

Misr or MISR may refer to:

- Misr, the romanized Arabic name for Egypt
- misr, singular of Arabic amsar, which were early Arabic "garrison towns"
- Misr (domain name), a top-level Internet domain name
- Misr, a variant of the AKM assault rifle produced in Egypt
- Misr Station, former name of Ramses Station, the main railroad station of Cairo
- Misr Station, one of two main railroad stations in Alexandria
- Multi-angle Imaging SpectroRadiometer, NASA's remote sensing instrument

== See also ==
- Misra (disambiguation)
- Mishawr Rawhoshyo (lit. 'Egypt Secret', a 2013 Indian film
