= Angela Misri =

Canadian novelist

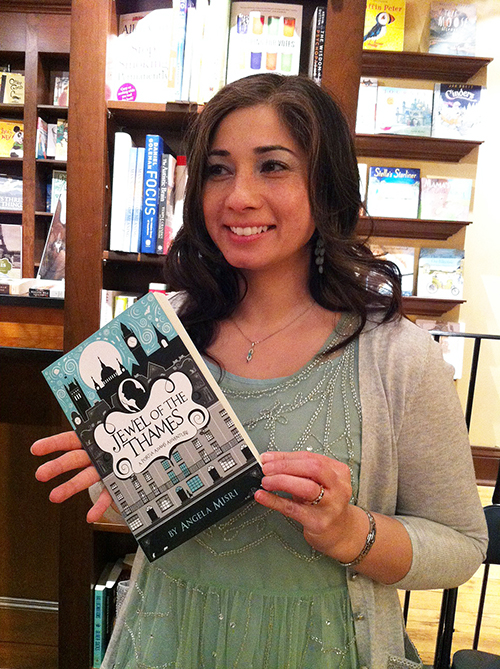
- Angela Misri at the book launch of Jewel of the Thames in 2014.
- Born: London, UK
- Education: University of Western Ontario
- Occupation: Novelist
- Writing career
- Years active: 2013–present
- Genres: Mystery, young adult fiction, children's fiction
- Notable work: Pickles vs the Zombies (2019)
- Notable awards: Hackmatack Award for best fiction novel, 2020
- Website: www.angelamisri.com

Angela Misri is a Kashmiri Canadian novelist and journalist and her fiction works include mystery, young adult fiction and children's fiction.

== Early life and education ==
Misri's family moved to Canada from London when she was 6. She received a master's degree from the University of Western Ontario and worked at the CBC while she was writing her first novel.

== Career ==
As of November 2021, Misri has published four novels that centre on detective Portia Adams: Jewel of the Thames (2014), Thrice Burned (2015), No Matter How Improbable (2016) and The Detective and the Spy (2020). Margaret Cannon praised The Detective and the Spy in her Globe and Mail column and the Canadian Broadcasting Corporation selected it as a recommended title for favourite Halloween books.

As of November 2023, Misri has published three novels in this series about animals in the zombie apocalypse: Pickles VS the Zombies (2019), and Trip of the Dead (2020). The third book in the series ValHamster came out in the spring of 2022. Pickles VS the Zombies was shortlisted for the 2020 Manitoba Young Reader's Choice Award and won the 2020 Hackmatack award for English Fiction.

== Works ==
- Misri, Angela (2014). Jewel of the Thames. Fierce Ink Press. ISBN 978-1-9277-4650-9.
- Misri, Angela (2015). Thrice Burned. Fierce Ink Press. ISBN 978-1-5447-0140-0.
- Misri, Angela (2016). No Matter How Improbable. Fierce Ink Press. ISBN 978-1-5448-9695-3.
- Misri, Angela (2019). Pickles vs the Zombies. Cormorant Books. ISBN 978-1-7708-6558-7.
- Misri, Angela (2019). The Detective and the Spy. Cormorant Books. ISBN 978-0-7352-6556-1.
- Misri, Angela (2019). Trip of the Dead. Cormorant Books. ISBN 978-1-7708-6596-9.
- Misri, Angela (2022). ValHamster. Cormorant Books. ISBN 978-1-7708-6651-5.
