= Meir Masri =

Israeli writer and scholar (born 1984)

- מאיר מסרי
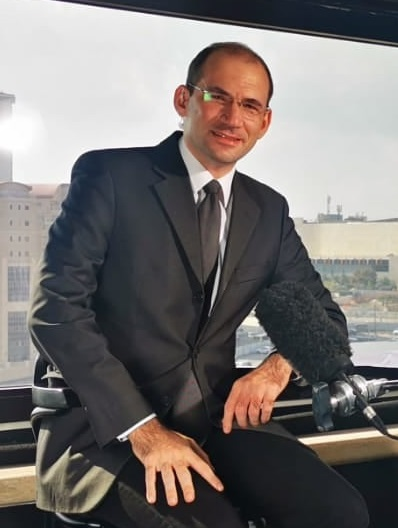
- Masri in 2020
- Born: 23 April 1984 (age 42)
- Education: Institute of Political Studies of Toulouse; Toulouse Capitole University; Paris 8 University; Hebrew University of Jerusalem
- Occupation: Scholar

Meir Masri (Hebrew: מאיר מסרי; born 23 April 1984) is an Israeli writer, professor and scholar of political science at the Hebrew University of Jerusalem, and an expert in international relations who lives in Jerusalem and Paris. He graduated from the Institute of Political Studies of Toulouse (known in French as Sciences Po Toulouse) and earned his doctorate in geopolitics from the Centre of Geopolitical Analysis and Research (known in French as the Centre de recherches et d'analyses géopolitiques) at the University of Paris VIII in March 2015. His dissertation examined how the Yishuv and later the State of Israel represented the Maronites of Lebanon and shaped policies toward them between 1920 and 2000.

Masri is the author of numerous books in French and articles published in Israeli newspapers. He is a regular speaker on several Israeli and international news channels.

He is the Founding President of the Middle East Pact and a former member of the Central Committee of the Israeli Labor Party. He is currently unaffiliated with any political party.

== Main books ==
- 300 fiches de culture générale, Studyrama, Paris, 2025 (300 General Knowledge Sheets).
- 250 fiches de culture générale, Studyrama, Paris, 2022 (250 General Knowledge Sheets).
- Syrie : La régionalisation et les enjeux internationaux d'une guerre imposée (Collective), L'Harmattan, Paris, 2013 (Syria: Regionalisation and International Stakes of an Imposed War).
- Les grandes batailles de l'histoire, Studyrama, Paris, 2012 (The Great Battles of History).
- Les frontières, Studyrama, Paris, 2011 (Borders).
- L'Iran paradoxal, dogmes et enjeux régionaux (Collective), L'Harmattan, Paris, 2008 (Paradoxical Iran, Regional Dogmas and Stakes).
