= Misra' =

A misra' (Arabic: مصراع, romanized: miṣrāʿ, plural: مصاريع, maṣārīʿ; Persian: مصراع, romanized: miṣrā'; Urdu: مصراع, romanized: miṣrā'; Azerbaijani: misra; Uzbek: misra) is a term used in Arabic, Persian, Turkic and Urdu poetry, which means 'half of a bayt'.

In Arabic poetry, a misra' therefore means half of one line of poetry, a hemistich. The two halves of the line are separated by a space.

In Persian, Turkic and Urdu poetry, a misra' means one whole line of poetry. A ruba'i is a poem of four misra's, i.e. two bayts.
